= Czech Republic =

Country in Central Europe

Czech Republic Česká republika (Czech)
- Flag Coat of arms
- Motto: Pravda vítězí ("Truth prevails")
- Anthem: "Kde domov můj" ("Where My Home Is")
- Location of the Czech Republic (dark green) – in Europe (green & dark gray) – in the European Union (green) – [Legend]
- Capital and largest city: Prague; 50°05′N 14°28′E
- Official languages: Czech
- Regional and minority languages (Note: Citizens belonging to minorities, which traditionally and on a long-term basis live within the territory of the Czech Republic, enjoy the right to use their language in communication with authorities and in courts of law (for the list of recognized minority languages, see Minority languages of the Czech Republic). Belarusian and Vietnamese since 4 July 2013. Article 25 of the Czech Charter of Fundamental Rights and Freedoms ensures the right of the national and ethnic minorities to education and communication with the authorities in their own language. Act No. 500/2004 Coll. (The Administrative Rule) in its paragraph 16 (4) (Procedural Language) ensures that a citizen of the Czech Republic who belongs to a national or an ethnic minority, which traditionally and on a long-term basis lives within the territory of the Czech Republic, has the right to address an administrative agency and proceed before it in the language of the minority. If the administrative agency has no employee with knowledge of the language, the agency is bound to obtain a translator at the agency's own expense. According to Act No. 273/2001 (Concerning the Rights of Members of Minorities) paragraph 9 (The right to use language of a national minority in dealing with authorities and in front of the courts of law) the same also applies to members of national minorities in the courts of law.) (Note: The Slovak language may be considered an official language in the Czech Republic under certain circumstances, as defined by several laws.): Belarusian; Bulgarian; Croatian; German; Greek; Hungarian; Polish; Romani; Russian; Rusyn; Serbian; Slovak; Ukrainian; Vietnamese
- Ethnic groups (2021): 89% Czechs; 3.3% Moravians; 0.9% Slovaks; 0.7% Ukrainians; 2.1% other; 4.0% two nationalities
- Religion (2021): 56.9% no religion; 11.7% Christianity; 9.3% Catholicism; 2.4% other Christian; 1.2% other; 30.1% unanswered
- Demonym: Czech
- Government: Unitary parliamentary republic
  - President: Petr Pavel
  - Prime Minister: Andrej Babiš
- Legislature: Parliament
  - Upper house: Senate
  - Lower house: Chamber of Deputies

Establishment
  - Duchy of Bohemia: c. 870
  - Kingdom of Bohemia: 1198
  - Czechoslovakia: 28 October 1918
  - Czech Republic: 1 January 1993

Area
  - Total: 78,871 km^{2} (30,452 sq mi) (115th)
  - Water (%): 2.18 (as of 2024)

Population
  - 2025 estimate: ▲10,915,839 (85th)
  - 2021 census: ▲10,524,167
  - Density: 133/km^{2} (344.5/sq mi) (91st)
- GDP (PPP): 2026 estimate
  - Total: ▲$692.166 billion (47th)
  - Per capita: ▲$64,071 (38th)
- GDP (nominal): 2026 estimate
  - Total: ▲$427.953 billion (40th)
  - Per capita: ▲$39,614 (38th)
- Gini (2023): ▼24.4 low inequality
- HDI (2023): ▲0.915 very high (29th)
- Currency: Czech koruna (CZK)
- Time zone: UTC+1 (CET)
  - Summer (DST): UTC+2 (CEST)
- Date format: d. m. yyyy
- Calling code: +420 (Note: Code 42 was shared with Slovakia until 1997.)
- ISO 3166 code: CZ
- Internet TLD: .cz (Note: Also .eu, shared with other European Union member states.)

The Czech Republic, (Note: /tʃɛk/ CHEK; Czech: Česká republika [ˈtʃɛskaː ˈrɛpublɪka].) also known as Czechia (Note: /ˈtʃɛkiə/ CHEK-ee-ə; Czech: Česko [ˈtʃɛsko].) and historically known as Bohemia, is a landlocked country in Central Europe. The country is bordered by Austria to the south, Germany to the west, Poland to the northeast, and Slovakia to the southeast. The Czech Republic has a hilly landscape that covers an area of 78,871 square kilometers (30,452 sq mi) with a mostly temperate continental and oceanic climate. The capital and largest city is Prague; other major cities and urban areas include Brno, Ostrava, Plzeň and Liberec.

The Duchy of Bohemia was founded in the 9th century under Great Moravia. It was formally recognized as an Imperial Estate of the Holy Roman Empire in 1002 and became a kingdom in 1198. Following the Battle of Mohács in 1526, all the Lands of the Bohemian Crown were gradually integrated into the Habsburg monarchy. Nearly a hundred years later, the Protestant Bohemian Revolt led to the Thirty Years' War. After the Battle of White Mountain, the Habsburgs consolidated their rule. With the dissolution of the Holy Roman Empire in 1806, the Crown lands became part of the Austrian Empire.

During the 19th century, the Czech lands underwent significant industrialization. Following the collapse of Austria-Hungary after World War I, most of the region became part of the First Czechoslovak Republic in 1918. Czechoslovakia was the only country in Central and Eastern Europe to remain a parliamentary democracy during the entirety of the interwar period. After the Munich Agreement in 1938, Nazi Germany systematically took control over the Czech lands. Czechoslovakia was restored in 1945 as the Third Czechoslovak Republic and three years later became an Eastern Bloc communist state following a coup d'état in 1948. Attempts to liberalize the government and economy were suppressed by a Soviet-led invasion of the country during the Prague Spring in 1968. In November 1989, the Velvet Revolution ended communist rule in the country and restored democracy. On 31 December 1992, Czechoslovakia was peacefully dissolved, with its constituent states becoming the independent states of the Czech Republic and Slovakia.

The Czech Republic is a unitary parliamentary republic and developed country with an advanced, high-income social market economy. It is a welfare state with a European social model, universal health care and free-tuition university education. It ranks 32nd in the Human Development Index. The Czech Republic is a member of the United Nations, NATO, the European Union, the OECD, the OSCE, the Council of Europe and the Visegrád Group.

== Etymology ==
The traditional English name "Bohemia" derives from Latin Boiohaemum, which means "home of the Boii" (a Gallic tribe). The current English name ultimately comes from the Czech word Čech. The name comes from the Slavic tribe (Czech: Češi, Čechové) and—according to legend—their leader Čech who brought them to Bohemia to settle on Říp, a 461-metre high hill. The etymology of the word Čech is uncertain. According to the most common derivation, it can be traced back to the Proto-Slavic root *čel-, meaning 'member of the people; kinsman'. Thus, it is cognate to the Czech word člověk 'person'.

The country has been traditionally divided into three lands, namely Bohemia (Čechy) in the west, Moravia (Morava) in the east, and Czech Silesia (Slezsko; the smaller, south-eastern part of historical Silesia, most of which is located within modern Poland) in the northeast. Known as the lands of the Bohemian Crown since the 14th century, a number of other names for the country have been used, including Czech/Bohemian lands, Bohemian Crown, Czechia, and the lands of the Crown of Saint Wenceslaus. When the country regained its independence after the dissolution of the Austro-Hungarian empire in 1918, the name Czechoslovakia was coined to reflect the union of the Czech and Slovak nations within one country.

After Czechoslovakia dissolved on 31 December 1992, Česko was adopted as the Czech short name for the new state, and the Ministry of Foreign Affairs of the Czech Republic recommended Czechia for the English-language equivalent. This form was not widely adopted at the time, leading to the long name Czech Republic being used in English in nearly all circumstances. The Czech government directed use of Czechia as the official English name in 2016. Czechia has been listed by the United Nations and is used by other organizations such as the European Union, NATO, the CIA, Google Maps, and the European Broadcasting Union. In 2022, the American AP Stylebook states "both [Czechia and the Czech Republic] are acceptable. The shorter name Czechia is preferred by the Czech government. If using Czechia, clarify in the story that the country is more widely known in English as the Czech Republic."

== History ==
=== Prehistory ===
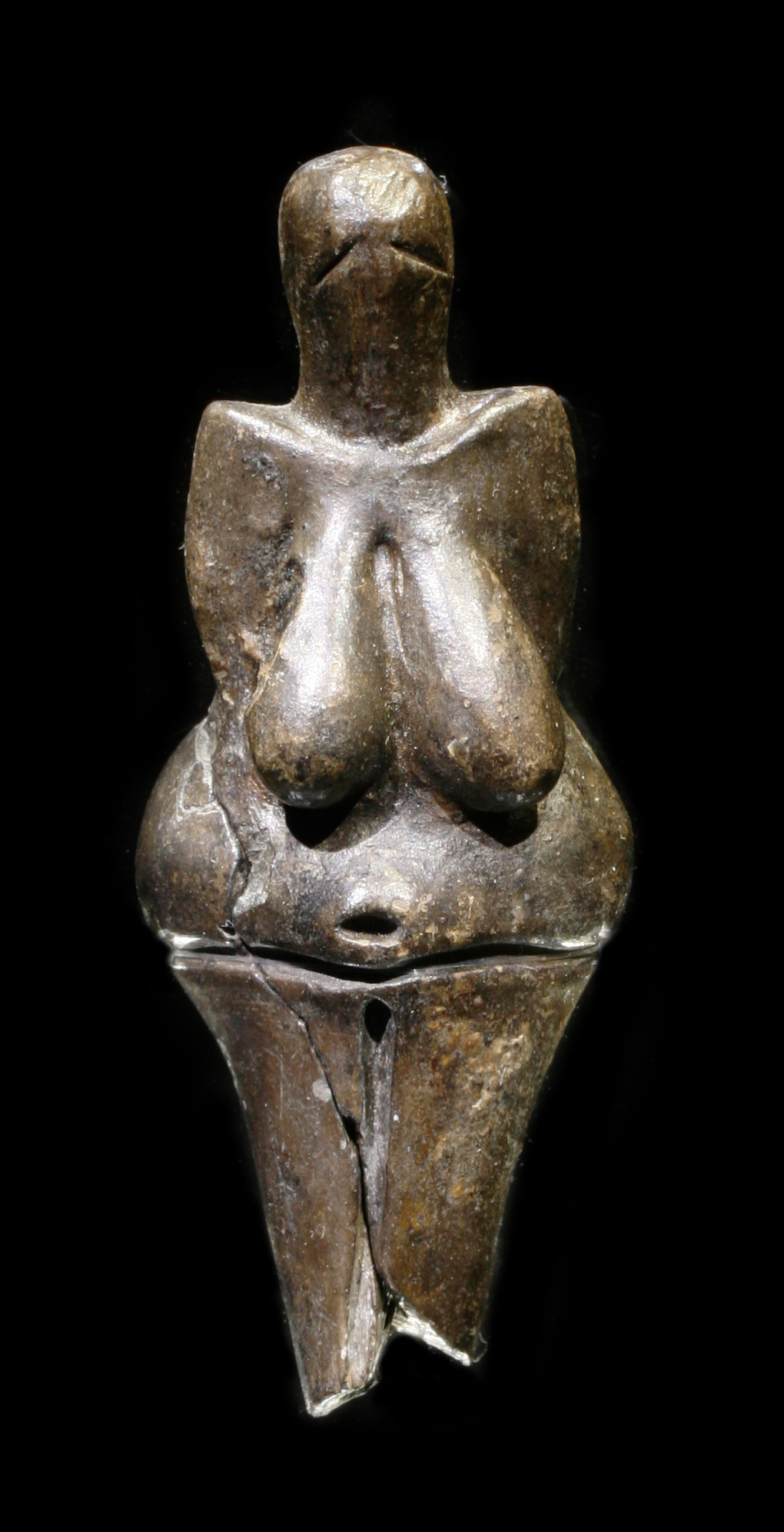
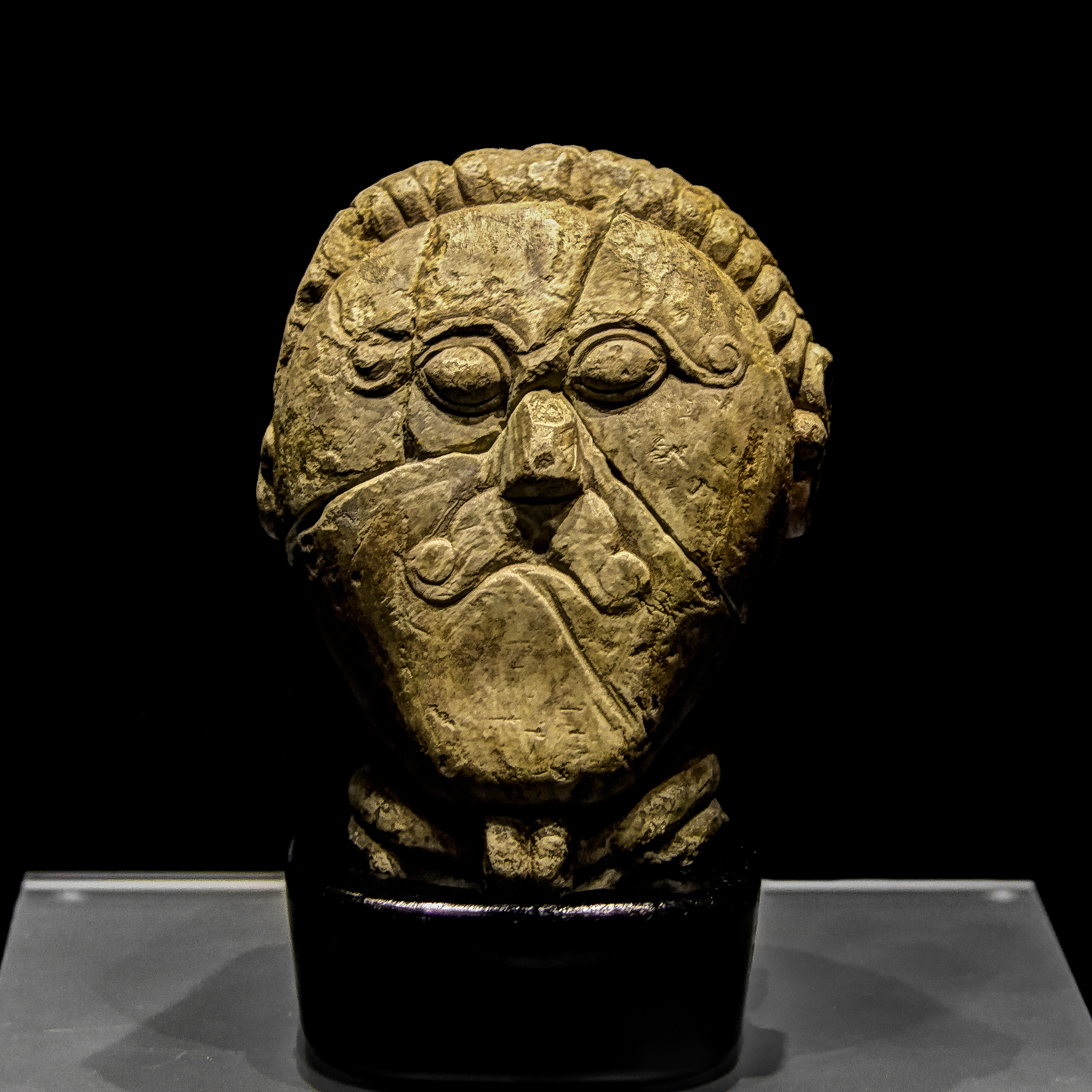
Left: Venus of Dolní Věstonice, dated to 29,000–25,000 BC, is the oldest ceramic figurine in the world.
Right: the stone head of a Celt is the most valuable Celtic sculpture in Europe and dates to the 3rd century BC.

Archaeological evidence indicates that the area now known as the Czech Republic has been inhabited since the Paleolithic era. Notably, the Venus of Dolní Věstonice, a ceramic figurine dated to approximately 29,000–25,000 BC, was discovered in this region. This artifact is considered the oldest known ceramic figurine in the world.

In the classical era, as a result of the 3rd century BC Celtic migrations, Bohemia became associated with the Boii. The Boii founded an oppidum near the site of modern Prague. In the 1st century AD, the Germanic tribes of the Marcomanni and Quadi settled there.

Slavs from the Black Sea–Carpathian Mountains region settled in the area (their migration was pushed by an invasion of peoples from Siberia and Eastern Europe into their area: Huns, Avars, Bulgars and Magyars). In the 6th century, the Huns had moved westwards into Bohemia, Moravia, and some of present-day Austria and Germany.

During the 7th century, the Frankish merchant Samo, supporting the Slavs fighting against nearby settled Avars, became the ruler of the first documented Slavic state in Central Europe, Samo's Empire. The principality of Great Moravia, controlled by Moymir dynasty, arose in the 8th century. It reached its zenith in the 9th century during the reign of Svatopluk I, holding off the influence of the Franks. Great Moravia was Christianized, with a role being played by the Byzantine mission of Cyril and Methodius. They codified the Old Church Slavonic language, the first literary and liturgical language of the Slavs, and the Glagolitic script.

=== Bohemia ===
The Crown of Bohemia within the Holy Roman Empire (1600). The Czech lands were part of the Empire in 1002–1806, and Prague was the imperial seat in 1346–1437 and 1583–1611.

The principality of the Bohemians was represented by many dukes and finally emerged as a centralized Duchy of Bohemia in the late 9th century when it was unified by the Přemyslid dynasty. From 1002 until 1806, Bohemia was an Imperial Estate of the Holy Roman Empire.

In 1212, Přemysl Ottokar I extracted the Golden Bull of Sicily from the emperor, confirming Ottokar and his descendants' royal status; the Duchy of Bohemia was raised to a kingdom. German immigrants settled in the Bohemian periphery in the 13th century. The Mongols in the invasion of Europe carried their raids into Moravia but were defensively defeated at Olomouc.

After a series of dynastic wars, the House of Luxembourg gained the Bohemian throne. Efforts for a reform of the church in Bohemia started already in the late 14th century. Jan Hus' followers seceded from some practices of the Roman Church and in the Hussite Wars (1419–1434) defeated five crusades organized against them by Emperor Sigismund. On 21 December 1421, Jan Žižka, a successful military commander and mercenary, led his group of forces in the Battle of Kutná Hora, resulting in a victory for the Hussites. He is honoured to this day as a national hero. During the next two centuries, 90% of the population in Bohemia and Moravia were considered Hussites. The pacifist thinker Petr Chelčický inspired the movement of the Moravian Brethren (by the middle of the 15th century) that completely separated from the Roman Catholic Church.

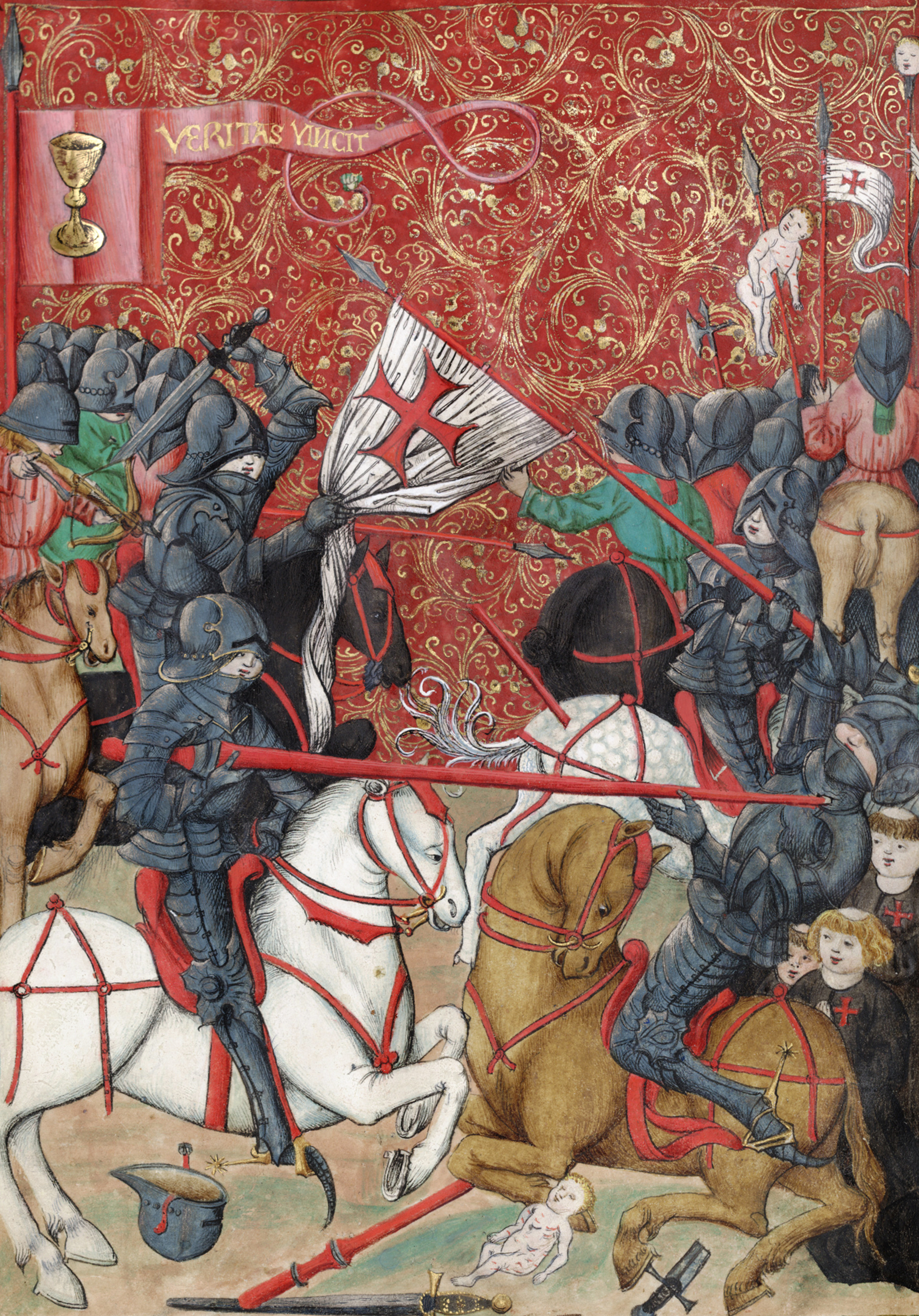
Battle between Hussites and crusaders during the Hussite Wars; Jena Codex, 15th century

After 1526, Bohemia came increasingly under Habsburg control as the Habsburgs became first the elected and then in 1627 the hereditary rulers of Bohemia. Between 1583 and 1611 Prague was the official seat of Holy Roman Emperor Rudolf II and his court.

The Defenestration of Prague and subsequent revolt against the Habsburgs in 1618 marked the start of the Thirty Years' War. In 1620, the rebellion in Bohemia was crushed at the Battle of White Mountain, and the ties between Bohemia and the Habsburgs' hereditary lands in Austria were strengthened. The leaders of the Bohemian Revolt were executed in 1621. The nobility and the middle class Protestants had to either convert to Catholicism or leave the country.

The following era of 1620 to the late 18th century became known as the "Dark Age". During the Thirty Years' War, the population of the Czech lands declined by a third through the expulsion of Czech Protestants as well as war, disease and famine. The Habsburgs prohibited all Christian confessions other than Catholicism. The flowering of Baroque culture shows the ambiguity of this historical period. Ottoman Turks and Tatars invaded Moravia in 1663. In 1679–1680 the Czech lands faced the Great Plague of Vienna and an uprising of serfs. There were peasant uprisings influenced by famine. Serfdom was abolished between 1781 and 1848. Several battles of the Napoleonic Wars took place in the Czech lands.

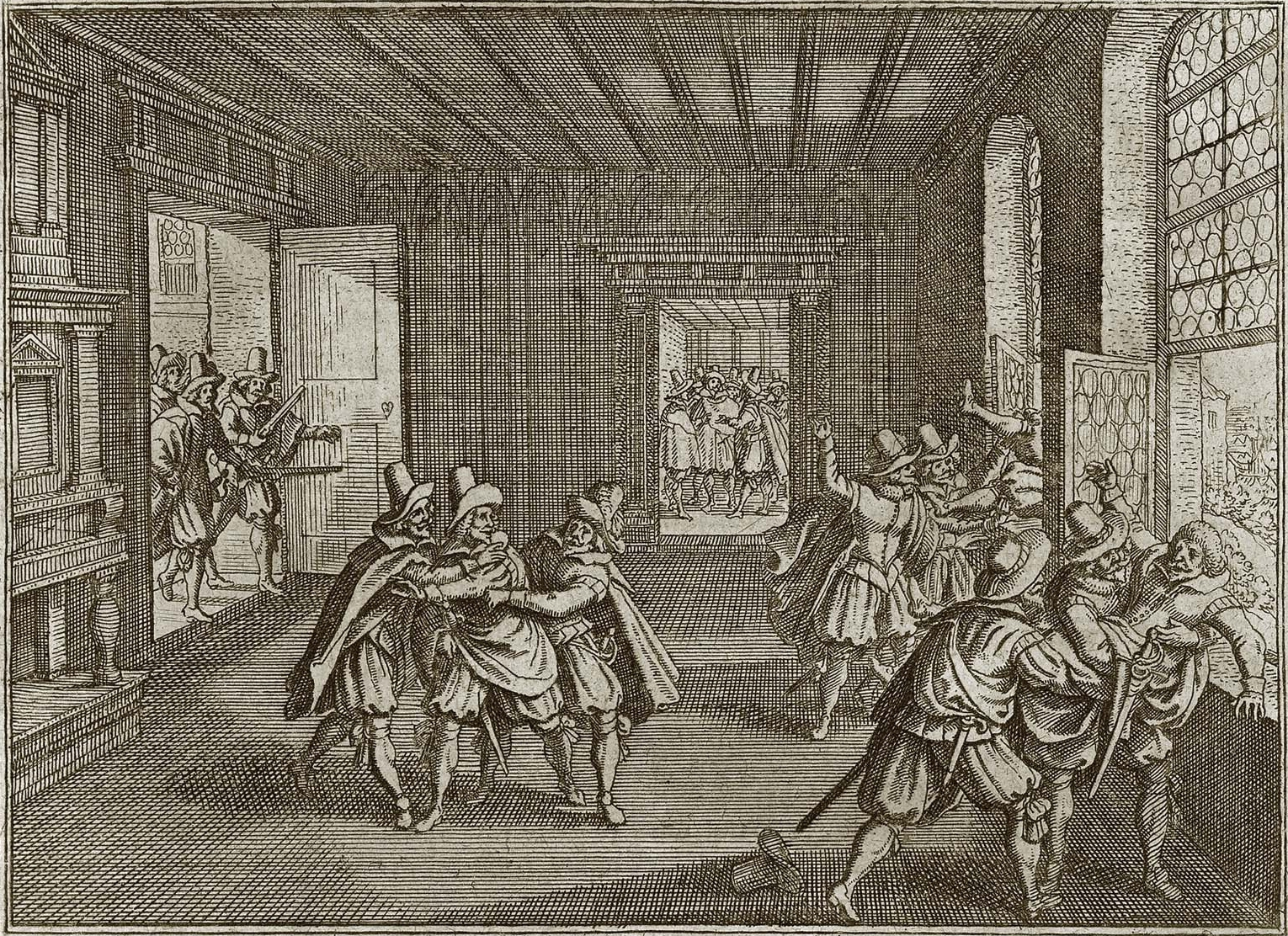
The 1618 Defenestration of Prague marked the beginning of the Bohemian Revolt against the Habsburgs and therefore the first phase of the Thirty Years' War.

The end of the Holy Roman Empire in 1806 led to degradation of the political status of Bohemia which lost its position of an electorate of the Holy Roman Empire as well as its own political representation in the Imperial Diet. Bohemian lands became part of the Austrian Empire. During the 18th and 19th century the Czech National Revival began its rise, with the purpose to revive Czech language, culture, and national identity. The Revolution of 1848 in Prague, striving for liberal reforms and autonomy of the Bohemian Crown within the Austrian Empire, was suppressed.

It seemed that some concessions would be made also to Bohemia, but in the end, Emperor Franz Joseph I affected a compromise with Hungary only. The Austro-Hungarian Compromise of 1867 and the never-realized coronation of Franz Joseph as king of Bohemia led to profound disappointment among prominent Czech politicians. The Bohemian Crown lands became part of the so-called Cisleithania.

The Czech Social Democratic and progressive politicians started the fight for universal suffrage. The first elections under universal male suffrage were held in 1907.

=== Czechoslovakia ===
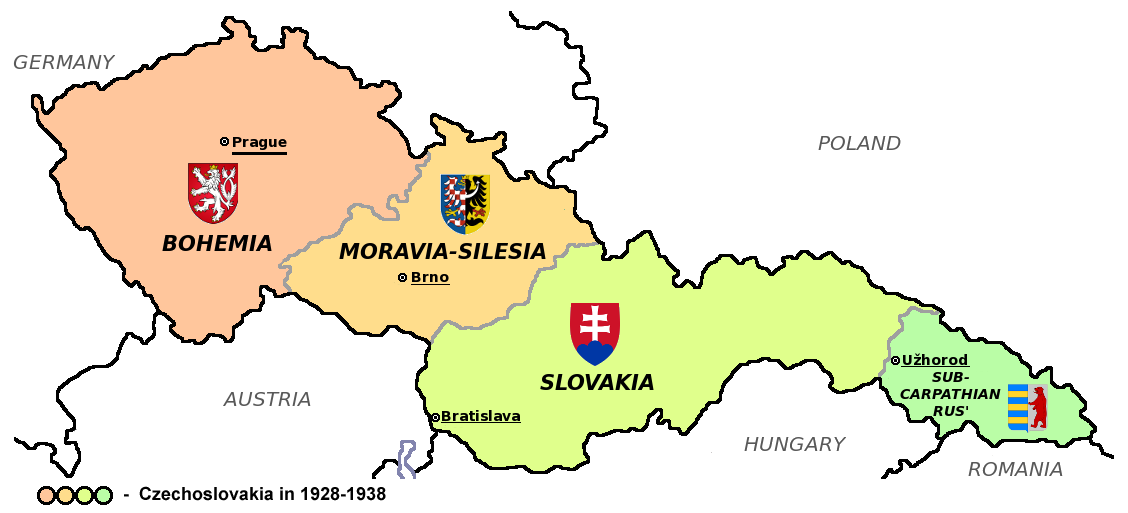
The First Czechoslovak Republic comprised 27% of the population of the former Austria-Hungary and nearly 80% of the industry.

In 1918, during the collapse of the Habsburg monarchy at the end of World War I, the independent republic of Czechoslovakia, which joined the winning Allied powers, was created, with Tomáš Garrigue Masaryk in the lead. This new country incorporated the Bohemian Crown.

The First Czechoslovak Republic comprised only 27% of the population of the former Austria-Hungary but nearly 80% of the industry, which enabled it to successfully compete with Western industrial states. In 1929 compared to 1913, the gross domestic product increased by 52% and industrial production by 41%. In 1938 Czechoslovakia was 10th in world industrial production. Czechoslovakia was the only country in Central and Eastern Europe to remain a liberal democracy throughout the entire interwar period. Although the First Czechoslovak Republic was a unitary state, it provided certain rights to its minorities, the largest being Germans (23.6% in 1921), Hungarians (5.6%) and Ukrainians (3.5%).

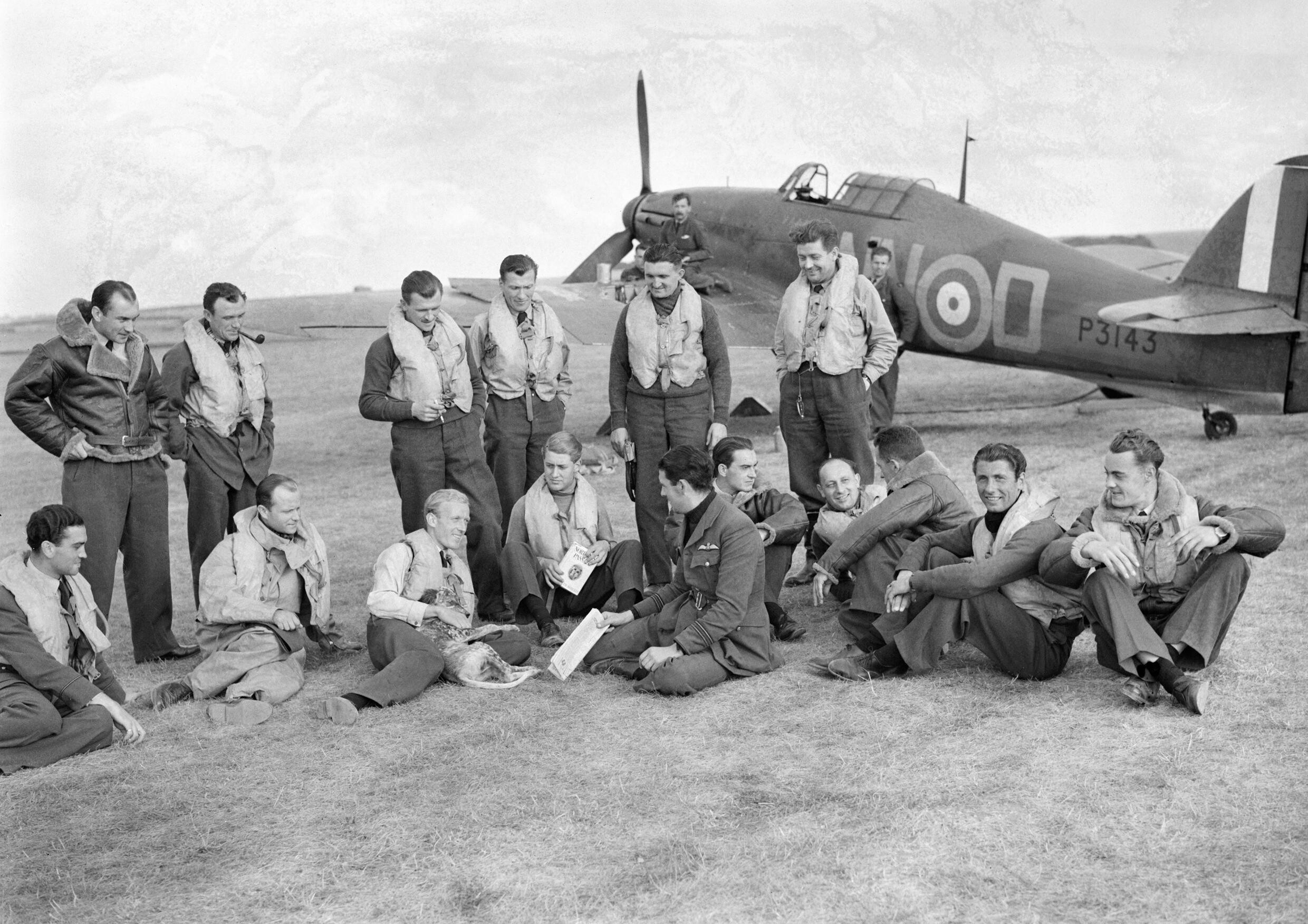
Czechoslovak fighter pilots of No. 310 Squadron RAF during the Battle of Britain in 1940

Western Czechoslovakia was occupied by Nazi Germany in 1938, which placed most of the region into the Protectorate of Bohemia and Moravia. The protectorate was proclaimed part of the Third Reich, and the president and prime minister were subordinated to Nazi Germany's Reichsprotektor. One Nazi concentration camp was located within the Czech territory at Terezín, north of Prague. The vast majority of the protectorate's Jews were murdered in Nazi-run concentration camps. The Nazi Generalplan Ost called for the extermination, expulsion, Germanization or enslavement of most or all Czechs for the purpose of providing more living space for the German people. There was Czechoslovak resistance to Nazi occupation as well as reprisals against the Czechoslovaks for their anti-Nazi resistance. The German occupation ended on 9 May 1945, with the arrival of the Soviet and American armies and the Prague uprising. Most German speakers were forcibly expelled from the country, first as a result of local acts of violence and then under the aegis of an "organized transfer" confirmed by the Soviet Union, the United States, and Great Britain at the Potsdam Conference.

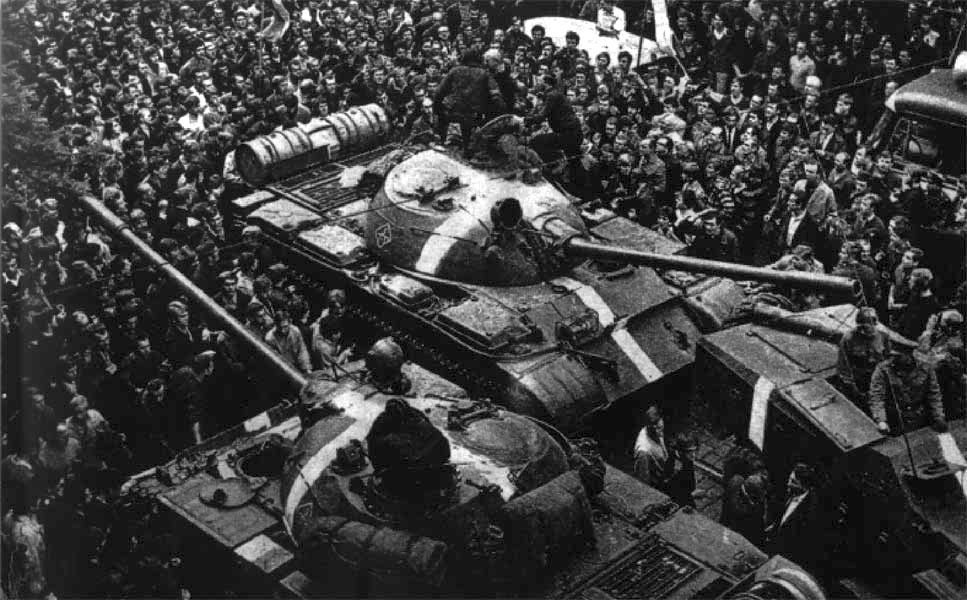
Prague during the 1968 Warsaw Pact invasion of Czechoslovakia

In the 1946 elections, the Communist Party gained 38% of the votes and became the largest party in the Czechoslovak parliament, formed a coalition with other parties, and consolidated power. A Soviet-backed coup d'état in 1948 formed a single-party government. For the next 41 years, the Czechoslovak communist state conformed to Eastern Bloc economic and political features. Perforating this tendency, the brief Prague Spring political liberalization was stopped by the 1968 Warsaw Pact invasion of Czechoslovakia, which contributed to the split on authoritarianism in the international communist movement and the rise of Eurocommunism in the West, while in Czechoslovakia, a repressive period of normalization ensued.

=== Czech Republic ===
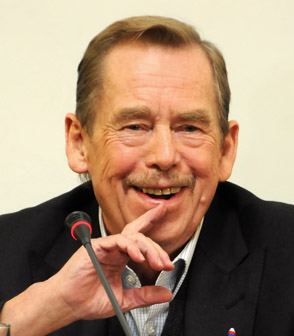
Václav Havel, one of the most important figures in Czech history during the 20th century—leader of the Velvet Revolution, the last president of Czechoslovakia and the first president of the Czech Republic

In November 1989, Czechoslovakia again became a liberal democracy through the Velvet Revolution. However, Slovak national aspirations strengthened (Hyphen War), and on 31 December 1992, the country peacefully split into the independent countries of the Czech Republic and Slovakia. Both countries went through economic reforms and privatizations, with the intention of creating a market economy, as they had been trying to do since 1990 when Czechs and Slovaks still shared the common state. This process was largely successful; in 2006 the Czech Republic was recognized by the World Bank as a "developed country", and in 2009 the Human Development Index ranked it as a nation of "Very High Human Development".

From 1991, the Czech Republic, originally as part of Czechoslovakia and since 1993 in its own right, has been a member of the Visegrád Group and from 1995, the OECD. The Czech Republic joined NATO in 1999, the European Union in 2004, and the Schengen Area in 2007.

Until 2017, either the centre-left Czech Social Democratic Party or the centre-right Civic Democratic Party led the government. In October 2017, the populist movement ANO 2011, led by Andrej Babiš, won the elections with three times more votes than its closest rival, the Civic Democrats. In December 2017, Czech President Miloš Zeman appointed Babiš as prime minister. In the 2021 elections, ANO 2011 was narrowly defeated, and Petr Fiala became prime minister. He formed a government coalition of the alliance Spolu (Civic Democratic Party, KDU-ČSL and TOP 09) and the alliance of Pirates and Mayors. In January 2023, retired general Petr Pavel won the presidential election, succeeding Zeman.

Following the 2022 Russian invasion of Ukraine, the Czech Republic took in around half a million Ukrainian refugees, the largest number per capita in the world. In December 2025, Babiš returned to office as prime minister, following his populist ANO party's win in October's parliamentary election.

== Geography ==
Topographic map

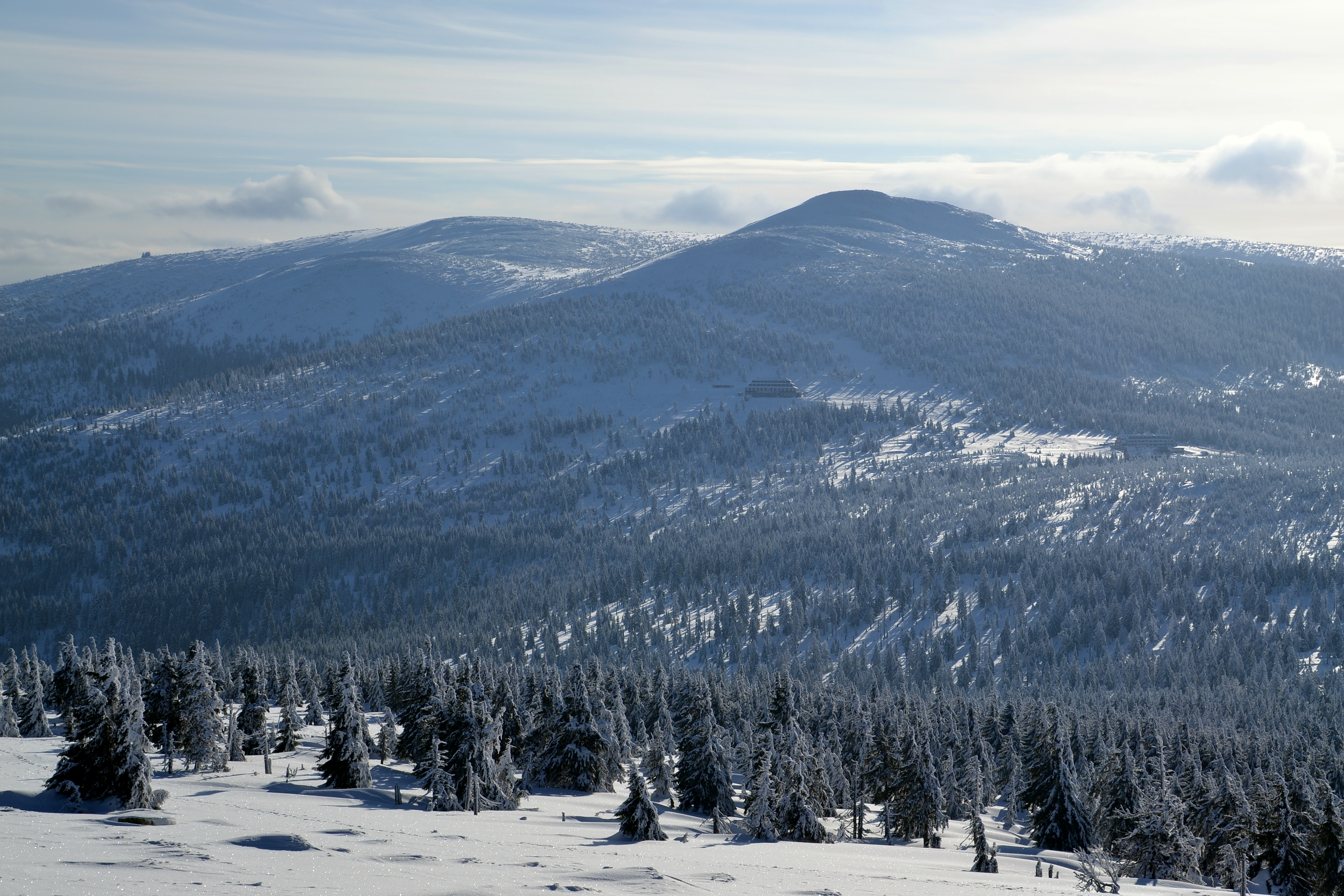
Giant Mountains in winter

The Czech Republic lies mostly between latitudes 48° and 51° N and longitudes 12° and 19° E. Bohemia, to the west, consists of a basin drained by the Elbe (Czech: Labe) and the Vltava rivers, surrounded by mostly low mountains, such as the Giant Mountains range (Czech: Krkonoše) of the Sudetes. The highest point in the country, Sněžka at 1,603 m (5,259 ft), is located here. Moravia in the east is hilly. It is drained mainly by the Morava River, but it also contains the source of the Oder River (Czech: Odra). The three historical lands correspond with the river basins of the Elbe and the Vltava for Bohemia; the Morava for Moravia; and the Oder river basin for Czech Silesia.

Water from the Czech Republic flows to three different seas: the North Sea, Baltic Sea, and Black Sea. The Czech Republic also leases the Moldauhafen, a 30,000-square-meter (7.4-acre) lot in the middle of the Hamburg Docks, which was awarded to Czechoslovakia by Article 363 of the Treaty of Versailles, to allow the landlocked country a place where goods transported down river could be transferred to seagoing ships. The territory reverts to Germany in 2028.

=== Climate ===
Köppen climate classification types of the Czech Republic using the −3 °C isotherm: Humid continental climate Oceanic climate Subarctic climate

The climate is temperate, situated in the transition zone between the oceanic and continental climate types, with warm summers and cold, cloudy and snowy winters. The temperature difference between summer and winter is the result of its landlocked geographical position.

Temperatures vary depending on the elevation. In general, at higher altitudes, the temperatures decrease and precipitation increases. The coldest temperature ever measured was −42.2 °C (−44.0 °F) in Litvínovice near České Budějovice in 1929, and the hottest measured was 40.4 °C (104.7 °F) in Dobřichovice in 2012. The wettest area is found around Bílý Potok in Jizera Mountains, and the driest region is the Louny District to the northwest of Prague. Another factor is the distribution of the mountains. At the highest peak of Sněžka (1,603 m or 5,259 ft), the average temperature is −0.4 °C (31 °F), whereas in the lowlands of the South Moravian Region, the average temperature is as high as 10 °C (50 °F). Prague has a similar average temperature, although this is influenced by urban factors.

The coldest month is usually January, followed by February and December. During these months, there is snow in the mountains and sometimes in the cities and lowlands. During March, April, and May, the temperature usually increases, especially during April, when the temperature and weather tends to vary during the day. Spring is also characterized by higher water levels in the rivers, due to melting snow with occasional flooding. The warmest month of the year is July, followed by August and June. On average, summer temperatures are about 20–30 °C (36–54 °F) higher than during winter. Summer is also characterized by rain and storms. Autumn generally begins in September, which is still warm and dry. During October, temperatures usually fall below 15 °C (59 °F) or 10 °C (50 °F) and deciduous trees begin to shed their leaves. By the end of November, temperatures usually range around the freezing point.

Most rain falls during the summer. Sporadic rainfall is throughout the year (in Prague, the average number of days per month experiencing at least 0.1 mm (0.0039 in) of rain varies from 12 in September and October to 16 in November), but concentrated rainfall (days with more than 10 mm (0.39 in) per day) are more frequent in the months of May to August (average around two such days per month). Severe thunderstorms, producing damaging straight-line winds, hail, and occasional tornadoes occur, especially during the summer period.

=== Biodiversity and conservation ===
Phytogeographically, the Czech Republic belongs to the Central European province of the Circumboreal Region, within the Boreal kingdom. According to the World Wide Fund for Nature, the territory can be subdivided into four ecoregions: the Western European broadleaf forests, Central European mixed forests, Pannonian mixed forests, and Carpathian montane conifer forests.

As of 2020, the Czech Republic ranks as the 21st most environmentally conscious country in the world in Environmental Performance Index. It had a 2018 Forest Landscape Integrity Index mean score of 1.71/10, ranking it 160th globally out of 172 countries. The Czech Republic has four national parks (Šumava National Park, Krkonoše National Park, České Švýcarsko National Park, Podyjí National Park) and 25 protected landscape areas. Fauna includes a wide variety of animal species. Some species (especially endangered ones) are bred in reserves. Among the rare animals are, for example, eagles, ospreys, bustards, and storks.

== Government and politics ==
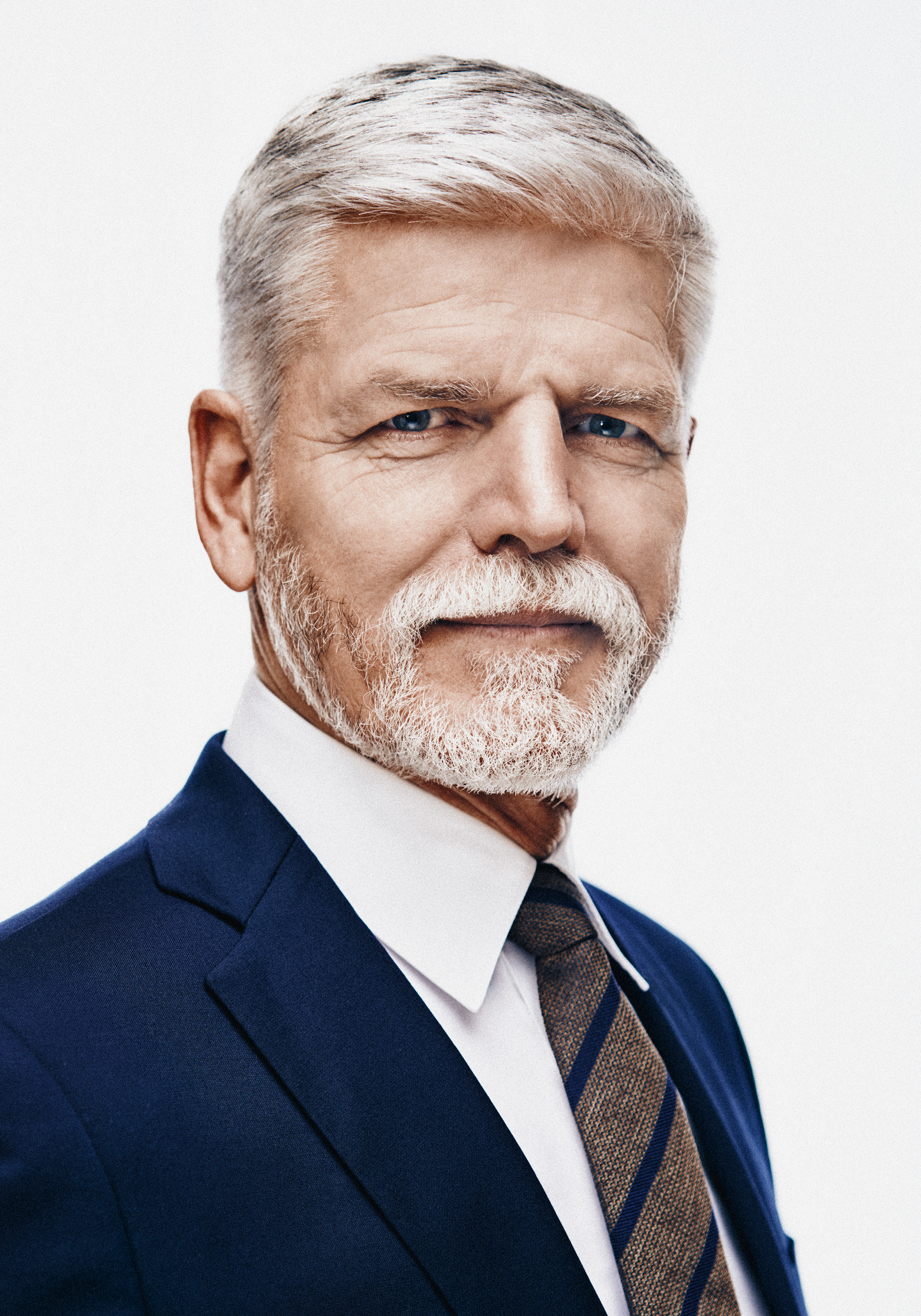
Petr Pavel
President

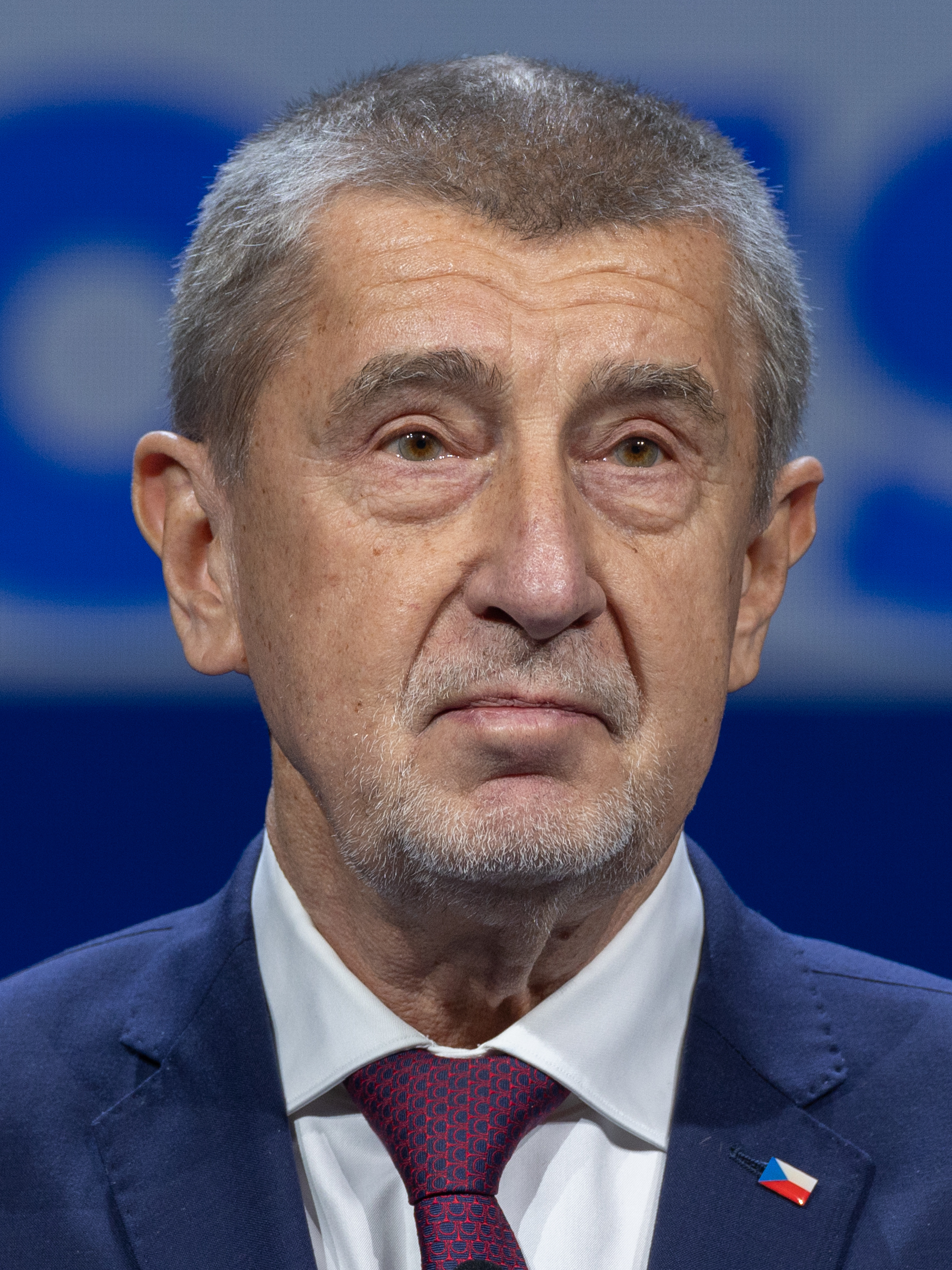
Andrej Babiš
Prime Minister

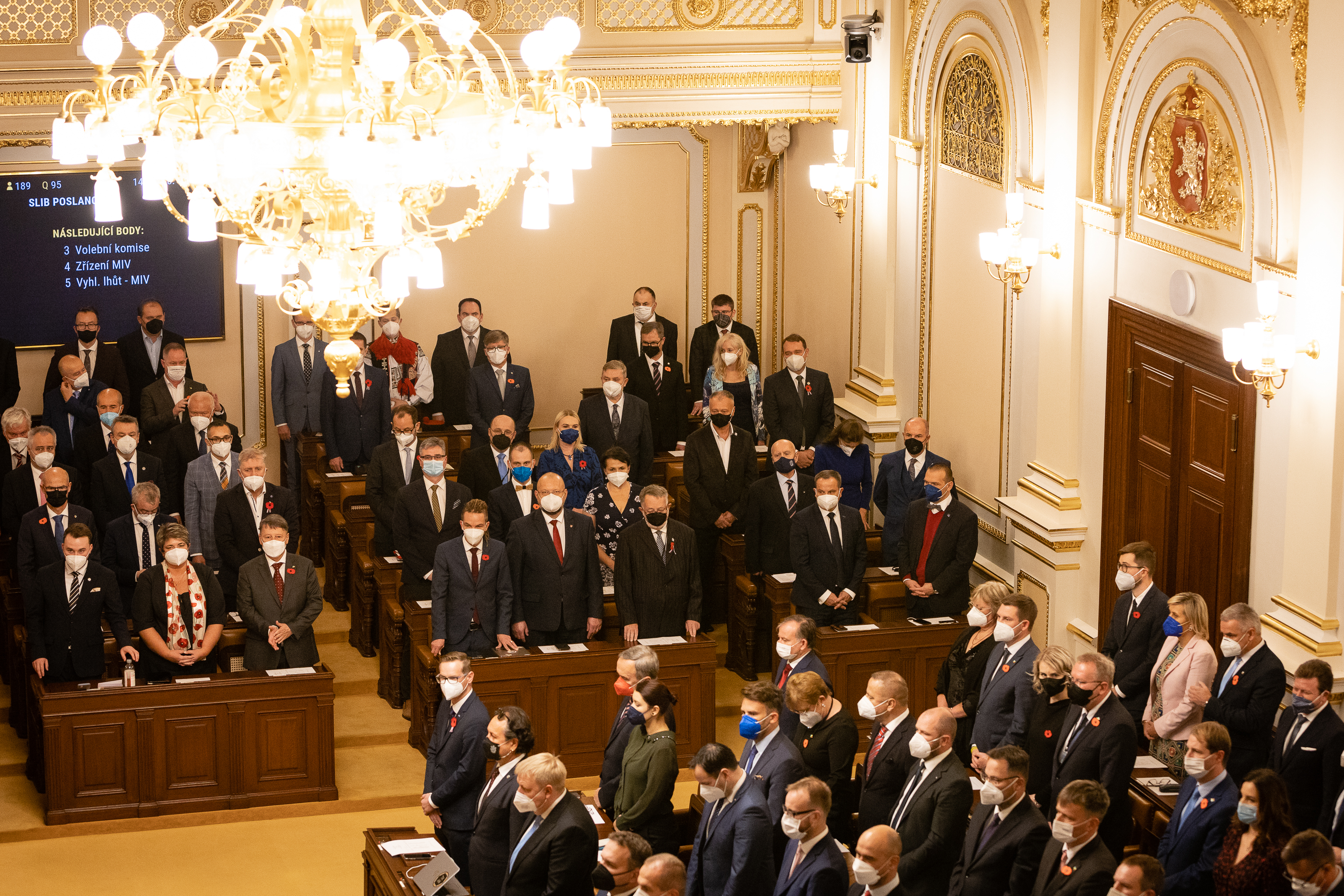
The Chamber of Deputies, lower house of the Parliament of the Czech Republic

The Czech Republic is a pluralist multi-party parliamentary representative democracy. The Parliament (Parlament České republiky) is bicameral, with the Chamber of Deputies (Czech: Poslanecká sněmovna, 200 members) and the Senate (Czech: Senát, 81 members). The members of the Chamber of Deputies are elected for a four-year term by proportional representation, with a 5% election threshold. There are 14 voting districts, identical to the country's administrative regions. The Chamber of Deputies, the successor to the Czech National Council, has the powers and responsibilities of the now defunct federal parliament of the former Czechoslovakia. The members of the Senate are elected in single-seat constituencies by two-round runoff voting for a six-year term, with one-third elected every even year in the autumn. This arrangement is modeled on the U.S. Senate, but each constituency is roughly the same size and the voting system used is a two-round runoff.

The president is a formal head of state with limited and specific powers, who appoints the prime minister, as well the other members of the cabinet on a proposal by the prime minister. From 1993 until 2012, the President of the Czech Republic was selected by a joint session of the parliament for a five-year term, with no more than two consecutive terms (Václav Havel and Václav Klaus were both elected twice). Since 2013, the president has been elected directly. Some commentators have argued that, with the introduction of direct election of the President, the Czech Republic has moved away from the parliamentary system and towards a semi-presidential one. The Government's exercise of executive power derives from the Constitution. The members of the government are the Prime Minister, Deputy prime ministers and other ministers. The Government is responsible to the Chamber of Deputies. The Prime Minister is the head of government and wields powers such as the right to set the agenda for most foreign and domestic policy and choose government ministers.

Main office-holders
Office	Name	Party	Since
President	Petr Pavel	Independent	9 March 2023
President of the Senate	Miloš Vystrčil	ODS	19 February 2020
President of the Chamber of Deputies	Tomio Okamura	SPD	5 November 2025
Prime Minister	Andrej Babiš	ANO	9 December 2025

=== Law ===
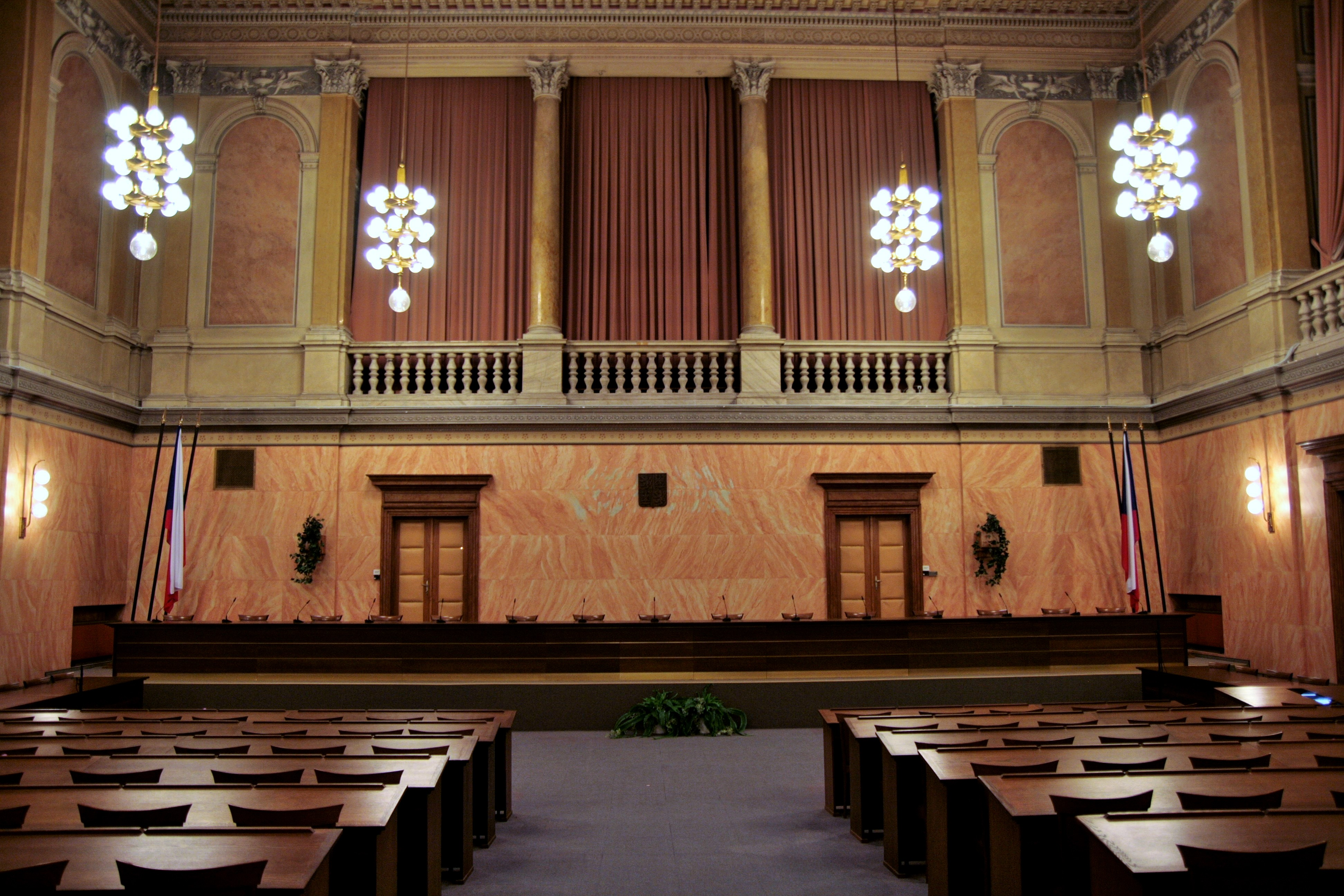
Interior of the Constitutional Court of the Czech Republic in Brno

The Czech Republic is a unitary state, with a civil law system based on the continental type, rooted in Germanic legal culture. The basis of the legal system is the Constitution of the Czech Republic adopted in 1993. The Penal Code is effective from 2010. The civil code became effective in 2014. The court system includes district, county, and supreme courts and is divided into civil, criminal, and administrative branches.

The Constitutional Court consists of 15 constitutional judges and oversees violations of the constitution by either the legislature or by the government. The Supreme Court is formed of 67 judges and is the court of highest appeal for most legal cases. The Supreme Administrative Court decides on issues of procedural and administrative propriety. It also has jurisdiction over certain political matters, such as the formation and closure of political parties, jurisdictional boundaries between government entities, and the eligibility of persons to stand for public office. The Supreme Court and the Supreme Administrative Court are both based in Brno, as is the Supreme Public Prosecutor's Office.

=== Foreign relations ===
Visa-free entry countries for Czech citizens in green, EU in blue (see citizenship of the European Union)

The Czech Republic has ranked as one of the safest or most peaceful countries for the past few decades. It is a member of the United Nations, the European Union, NATO, OECD, Council of Europe and is an observer to the Organization of American States.

The Czech passport is restricted by visas. According to the 2018 Henley & Partners Visa Restrictions Index, citizens have visa-free access to 173 countries, which ranks them 7th globally. The World Tourism Organization ranks the Czech passport 24th. The US Visa Waiver Program applies to Czech nationals.

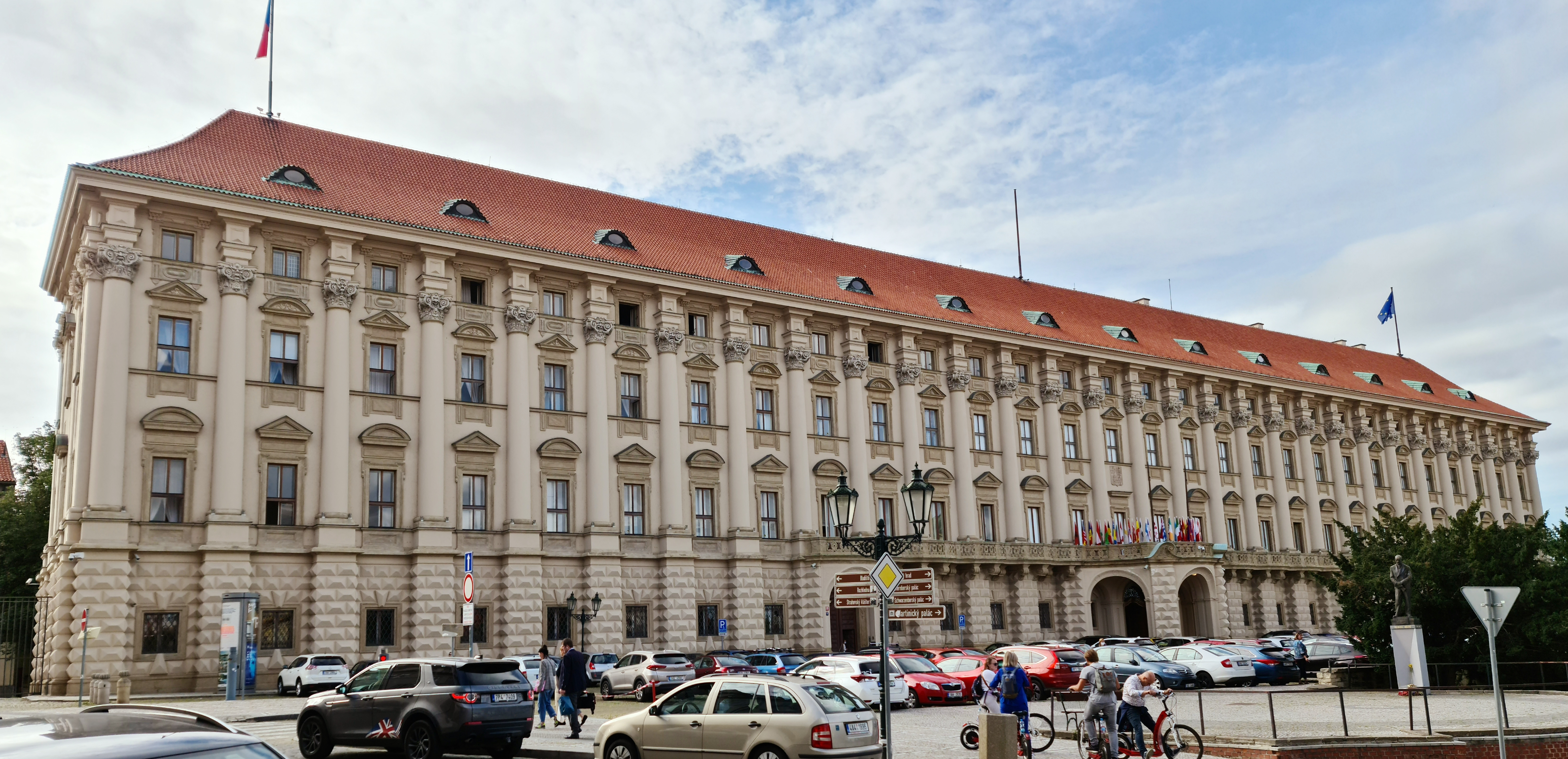
Ministry of Foreign Affairs in Prague

The prime minister and minister of foreign affairs have primary roles in setting foreign policy, although the president also has influence and represents the country abroad. Membership in the European Union and NATO is central to foreign policy. The Office for Foreign Relations and Information serves as the foreign intelligence agency responsible for espionage and foreign policy briefings, as well as protection of embassies abroad.

The Czech Republic has ties with Slovakia, Poland and Hungary as a member of the Visegrád Group, as well as with Germany, Israel, the United States and the European Union and its members. After 2020, relations with Asian democratic states, such as Taiwan, are being strengthened. Conversely, the Czech Republic has long had bad relations with Russia; from 2021, the Czech Republic appears on Russia's official list of enemy countries. The Czech Republic also has problematic relations with China.

Czech officials have supported dissenters in Belarus, Moldova, Myanmar and Cuba. Notable Czech diplomats of the past include Jaroslav Lev of Rožmitál, Humprecht Jan Czernin, Count Philip Kinsky of Wchinitz and Tettau, Wenzel Anton, Prince of Kaunitz-Rietberg, Prince Karl Philipp Schwarzenberg, Alois Lexa von Aehrenthal, Ottokar Czernin, Edvard Beneš, Jan Masaryk, Jiří Hájek, Jiří Dienstbier, Michael Žantovský, Petr Kolář, Alexandr Vondra, Prince Karel Schwarzenberg and Petr Pavel.

=== Military ===
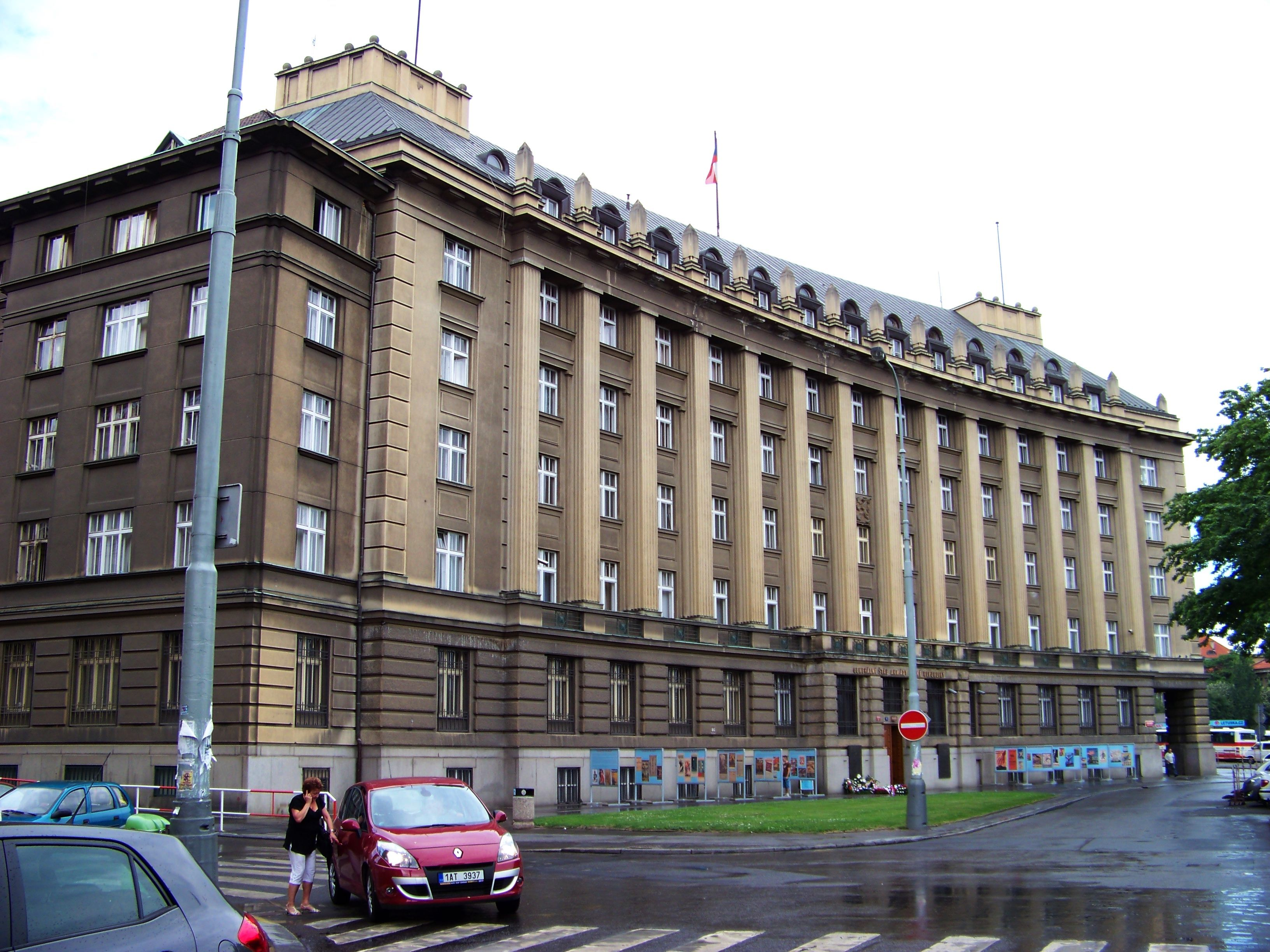
General Staff of the Army of the Czech Republic in Prague

The Czech Armed Forces consist of the Czech Land Forces, the Czech Air Force and of specialized support units. The armed forces are managed by the Ministry of Defence. The president is commander-in-chief of the armed forces. In 2004 the army became a fully professional organization, and compulsory military service was abolished. Defence spending is approximately 1.28% of the GDP (2021). The armed forces are charged with protecting the Czech Republic and its allies, promoting global security interests, and contributing to NATO.

As a member of NATO, the military participated in the Resolute Support Mission and Kosovo Force operations. The Czech Air Force served in the Baltic states and Iceland. The main equipment of the Czech military includes JAS 39 Gripen multi-role fighters, Aero L-159 Alca combat aircraft, AH-1Z Viper attack helicopters, armored vehicles (Pandur II, BVP-2) and tanks (T-72M4CZ and Leopard 2A4).

=== Human rights ===
Human rights in the Czech Republic are guaranteed by the Charter of Fundamental Rights and Freedoms and international treaties on human rights. Nevertheless, there were cases of human rights violations such as discrimination against Roma children, for which the European Commission asked the Czech Republic to provide an explanation, or the illegal sterilization of Roma women, for which the government apologized. People of the same sex can enter into a "registered partnership". Conducting same-sex marriage is not legal.

=== Administrative divisions ===
The Czech Republic is divided into thirteen regions (Czech: kraje, singular kraj) and the capital city of Prague. Every region has its own elected regional assembly and a regional governor. In Prague, the assembly and presidential powers are executed by the city council and the mayor. The 76 districts (okresy, singular okres) including three "statutory cities" (without Prague, which had special status) lost most of their importance in 1999 in an administrative reform; they remain as territorial divisions and seats of various branches of state administration.

The smallest administrative units are obce (municipalities). As of 2021, there are 6,254 municipalities. Cities and towns are also municipalities. Prague is both a region and a municipality.

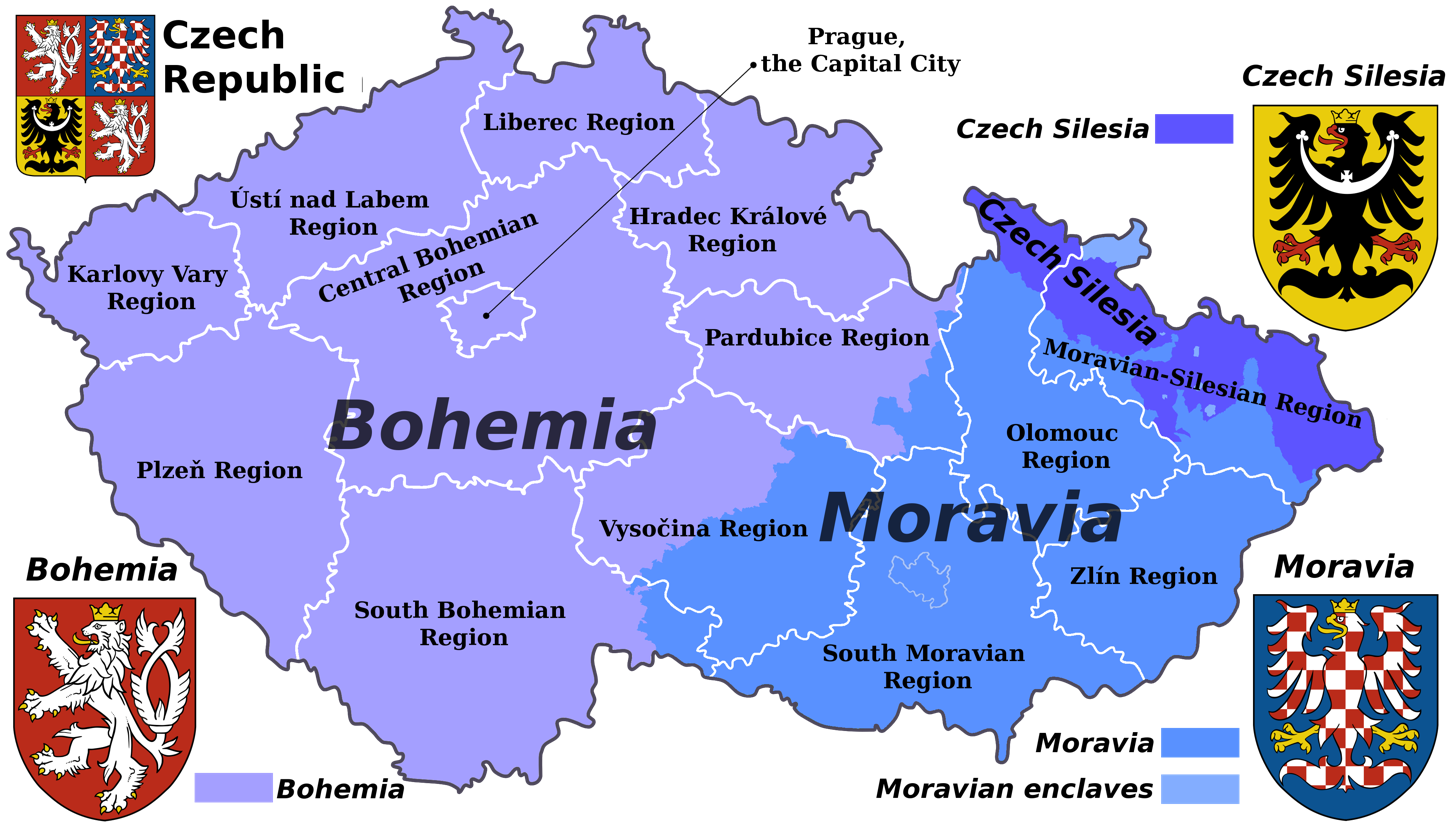
Map of the Czech Republic with traditional regions and current administrative regions

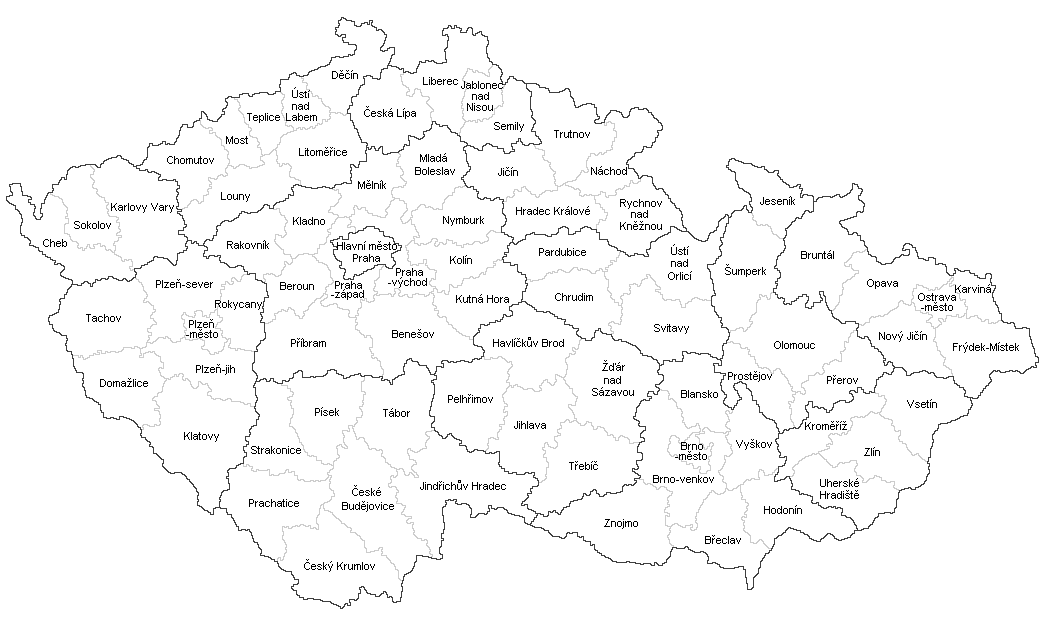
Map with court districts

== Economy ==
Real GDP per capita in the Czech Republic from 1973 to 2018

The Czech Republic is part of the European Single Market and the Schengen Area (dark and light blue on the map above), but uses its own currency, the Czech koruna.

The Czech Republic has a developed, high-income social market economy with a strong export sector. It maintains a welfare state consistent with the European social model. The Czech Republic belongs to the OECD and the European Union's single market. The country uses the Czech koruna, with monetary policy set by the independent Czech National Bank.

Services are the largest sector. Industry, excluding construction, accounts for about 26% of gross value added—one of the highest shares in the EU. Czech factories export vehicles, machinery and electronics, as well as components used by manufacturers abroad. Germany is the largest market for these exports, together with the rest of the EU. Exports were equivalent to about 75% of GDP in 2025.

GDP per capita in purchasing power standards was 92% of the EU average in 2025. Unemployment averaged 2.8%, the lowest rate in the EU, although employers continued to face labour shortages.

The 2026 European Innovation Scoreboard ranked the Czech Republic 19th in the EU. Its score of 79.1% of the EU average put it in the "Moderate Innovator" group. This was the highest score among the four Visegrád countries, followed by Hungary, Poland and Slovakia.

=== Industry ===
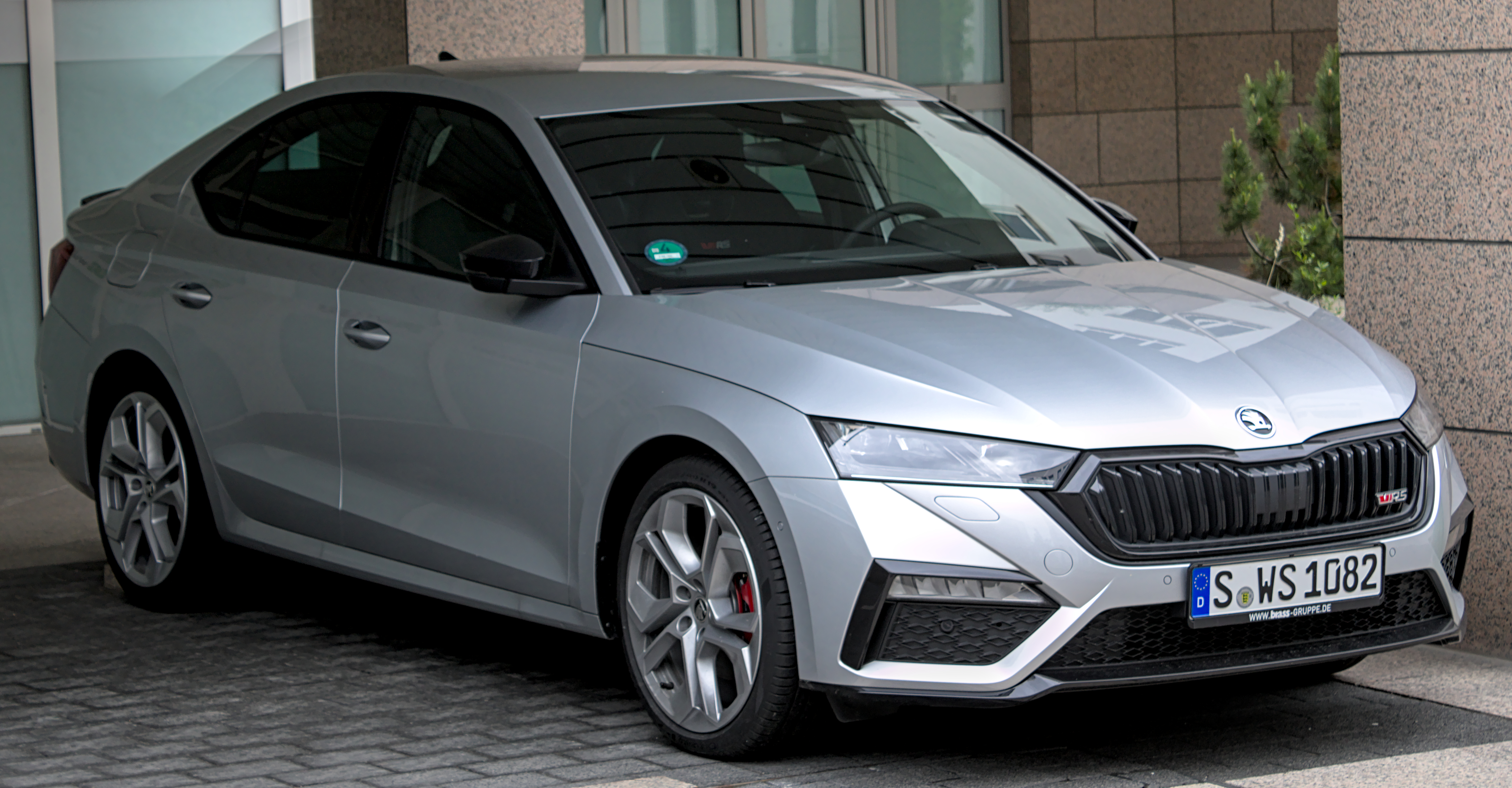
Škoda Octavia RS iV

Industry accounts for more of the Czech economy than is typical across the EU. Major manufacturing industries are motor vehicles, machinery, metal products, and electrical equipment.

The automotive industry is the country’s largest manufacturing sector. Škoda Auto manufactures cars in Mladá Boleslav and Kvasiny, Hyundai in Nošovice, and Toyota in Kolín. Numerous suppliers produce automotive components for factories in the Czech Republic and elsewhere in Europe. Tatra manufactures heavy-duty trucks for civilian and military use in Kopřivnice. In 2025, Czech factories produced 1.45 million passenger cars, more than 90% of which were exported. Bus producers include SOR and Iveco Bus, whose factory in Vysoké Mýto is its largest worldwide.

Railway manufacturing and power engineering are also part of Czech industry. Škoda Transportation makes trains, trams and trolleybuses. In Plzeň, Doosan Škoda Power manufactures steam turbines.

The aerospace industry produces aircraft and aircraft engines. Aero Vodochody builds the L-39 Skyfox jet trainer. Aircraft Industries in Kunovice produces the L 410 transport aircraft, and GE Aerospace makes turboprop engines in Prague.

Foxconn manufactures electronics in the Czech Republic, and Onsemi produces semiconductors. Thermo Fisher Scientific and Tescan make electron microscopes in Brno, where approximately one-third of the world’s electron microscopes are produced.

Other branches of Czech manufacturing include steelmaking, oil refining, petrochemicals, pharmaceuticals, food processing and brewing. Třinecké železárny is the country’s largest steel producer, and Orlen Unipetrol operates refineries in Litvínov and Kralupy nad Vltavou. Agrofert’s businesses include chemical production, dairies, bakeries and meat processing.

GZ Media, based in Loděnice, is the world’s largest manufacturer of vinyl records. The company produced approximately 75 million records worldwide in 2025.

Defense has also been a traditionally important part of industry, with Czechoslovakia having been the world's largest exporter of arms in 1934 and 1935. In 2025, the largest defense companies were Czechoslovak Group, STV Group, Colt CZ Group and Omnipol.

=== Energy ===
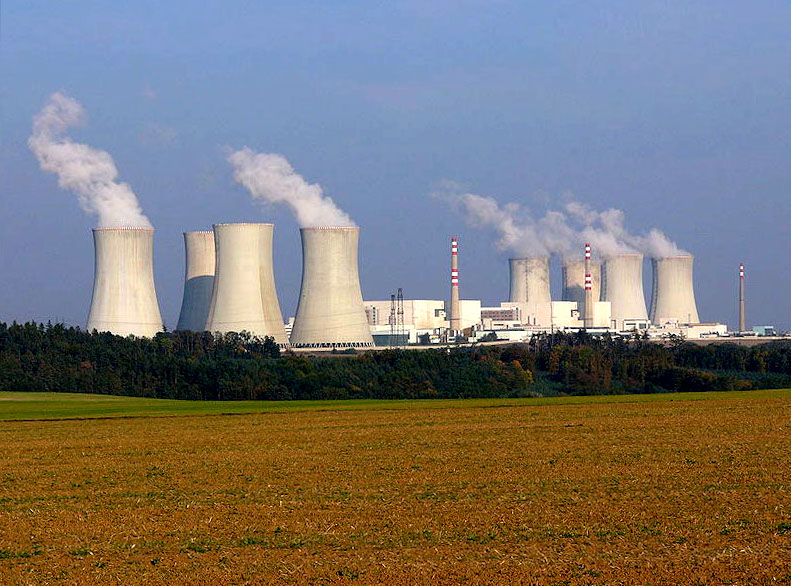
Dukovany Nuclear Power Station

Nuclear power and coal are the main sources of electricity in the Czech Republic. In 2025, nuclear power accounted for approximately 42% of electricity generation and renewable sources for 16.3%. Electricity production exceeded domestic consumption, with net exports of about 7.4 TWh.

ČEZ operates the country's two nuclear power stations, Temelín and Dukovany. Temelín is the largest power station in the country by installed capacity. In June 2025, ČEZ signed a contract with Korea Hydro & Nuclear Power to build two additional reactors at Dukovany. ČEZ is also preparing a small modular reactor project at Temelín with Rolls-Royce SMR.

Brown coal is used to generate electricity and supply district heating. Its use in heat production declined slightly in 2025, while the use of natural gas and biomass increased. The country has also diversified its oil and gas supplies since the Russian invasion of Ukraine in 2022. In 2025, natural gas supplies came from Norway and LNG terminals in northwestern Europe. The expansion of the TAL oil pipeline enabled the country to replace Russian crude oil with supplies delivered through the port of Trieste and the TAL and IKL pipelines.

=== Transport infrastructure ===
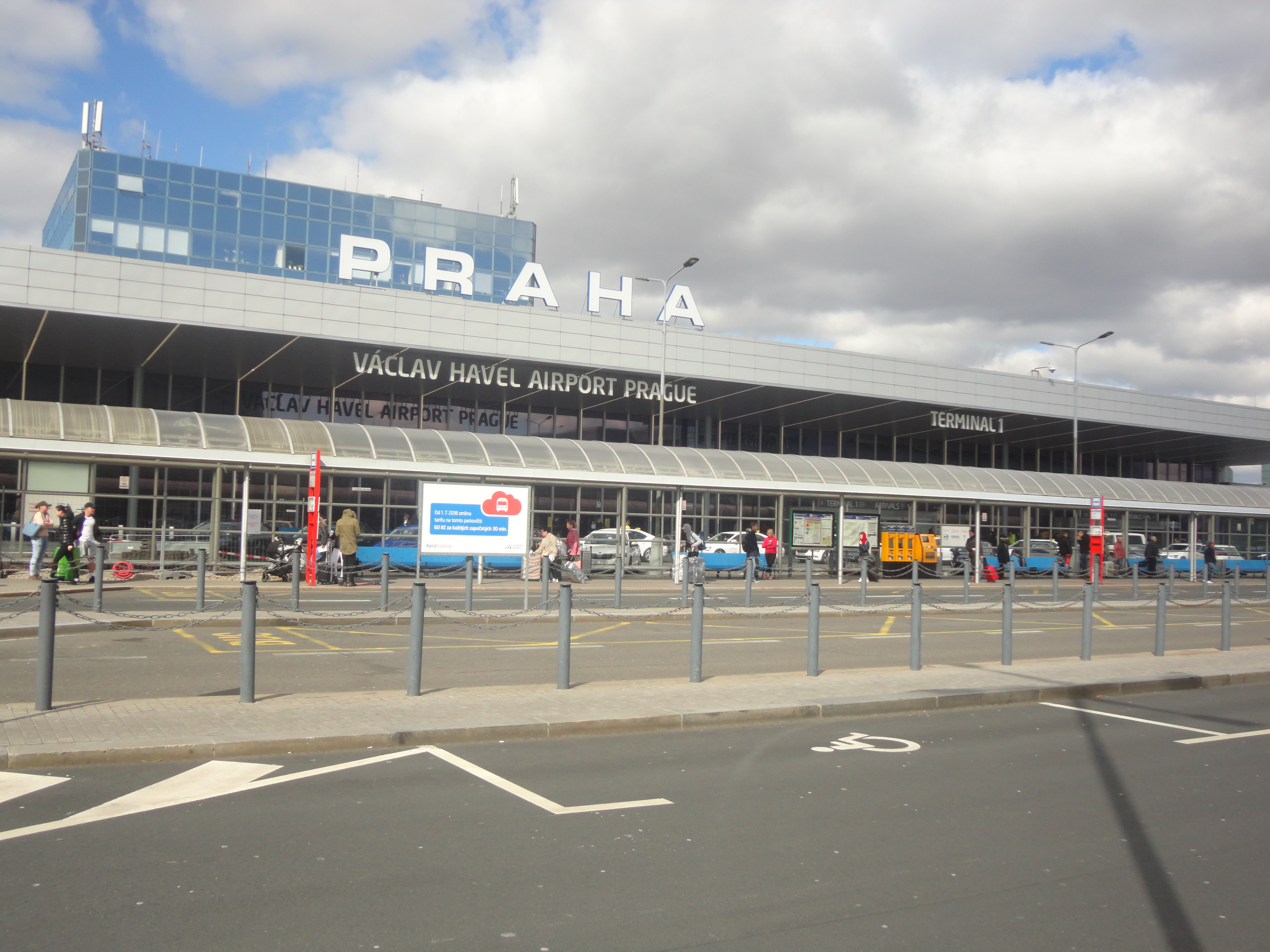
Václav Havel Airport Prague

In 2025, the Czech road and motorway network totalled about 56,020 km (34,810 mi). Motorways account for about 1,570 km (980 mi), with the longest, the D1, running from Prague through Brno and Ostrava.

The Czech Republic has the densest railway network in the European Union. Its railway lines totalled 9,510 km (5,910 mi) in 2025, of which 3,314 km (2,059 mi) were electrified; most lines were single-track. České dráhy is the main passenger operator, while RegioJet and Leo Express also run passenger services. In August 2025, Pendolino trains began running at up to 200 km/h (120 mph) on parts of the Prague–České Budějovice line. A planned high-speed network would connect Prague, Brno and Ostrava, with links to Germany, Poland, Austria and Slovakia.

Regional integrated transport systems let passengers travel on participating trains and buses with a single ticket. The system serving Prague and Central Bohemia also covers the Prague Metro, trams and trolleybuses.

Václav Havel Airport Prague is the country's main international airport and handles about 17.8 million per year. Scheduled and charter passenger flights also operate from Brno, Ostrava and Pardubice, while Kunovice and Vodochody are the country's non-public international airports.

=== IT and telecommunications ===
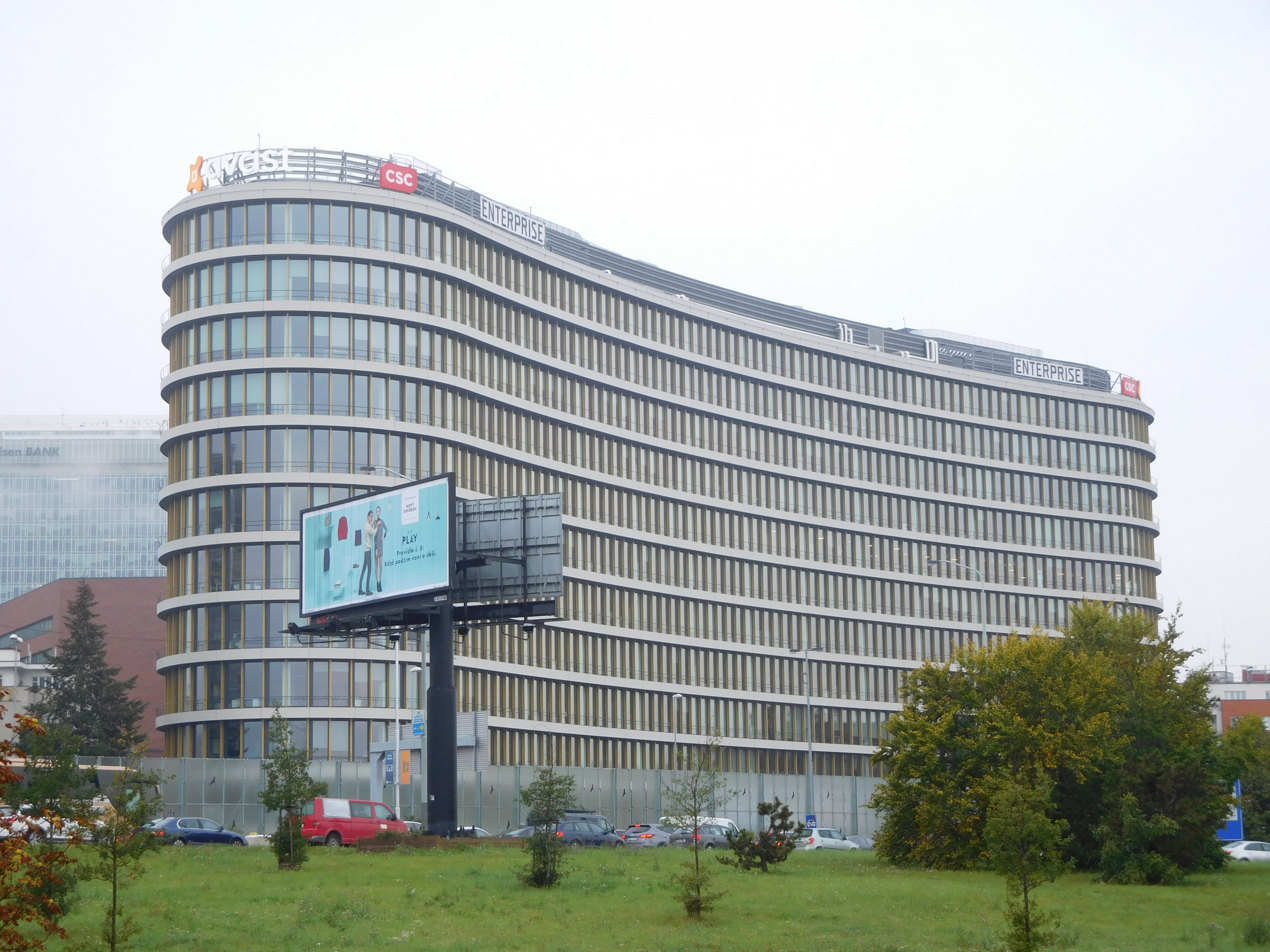
The main office of the antivirus group Avast in Prague

The information and communications technology (ICT) sector employed around 201,000 people in 2024. Exports of ICT services reached CZK 187 billion in 2025, accounting for 18.1% of the country's services exports.

Seznam.cz, a Czech internet company founded in 1996, offers its own search engine, maps, email and other online services. Brno-based Seyfor, founded in 1990, provides accounting and business software in seven European countries. The Czech Republic was also the birthplace of the antivirus companies Avast and AVG. Their combined worldwide market share was at one point estimated at 32.4%. Both are now part of Gen Digital, formed following merger in 2022.

Mews, Productboard and Rohlik Group are Czech-founded companies to have reached unicorn status, with valuations exceeding US$1 billion. Founded in Prague in 2012, Mews provides software for managing hotels. Productboard helps companies plan new products and features using customer feedback. Rohlik Group started as an online supermarket in the Czech Republic and has since expanded into other European countries, developing its own technology for warehouses and deliveries.

SAP employs over 4,000 people across the Czech Republic, its second-largest employment base in Europe after Germany. Microsoft’s development center in Prague, its largest in continental Europe, employs about 1,500 engineers. DHL IT Services in Prague serves as company's largest IT hub, developing systems used across DHL Group.

Kyndryl’s center in Brno supports customers worldwide, providing cloud services and management of IT infrastructure. Red Hat, a subsidiary of IBM, develops cloud and open-source software in Brno. Oracle also has developers there working on NetSuite, its business software platform.

The main mobile network operators are O2, T-Mobile and Vodafone. CETIN operates much of the country's fixed-line telecommunications infrastructure. In 2025, 5G networks covered 99.7% of Czech households. Fibre-to-the-premises coverage was 44.8%, compared with an EU average of 74.1%.

=== Tourism ===
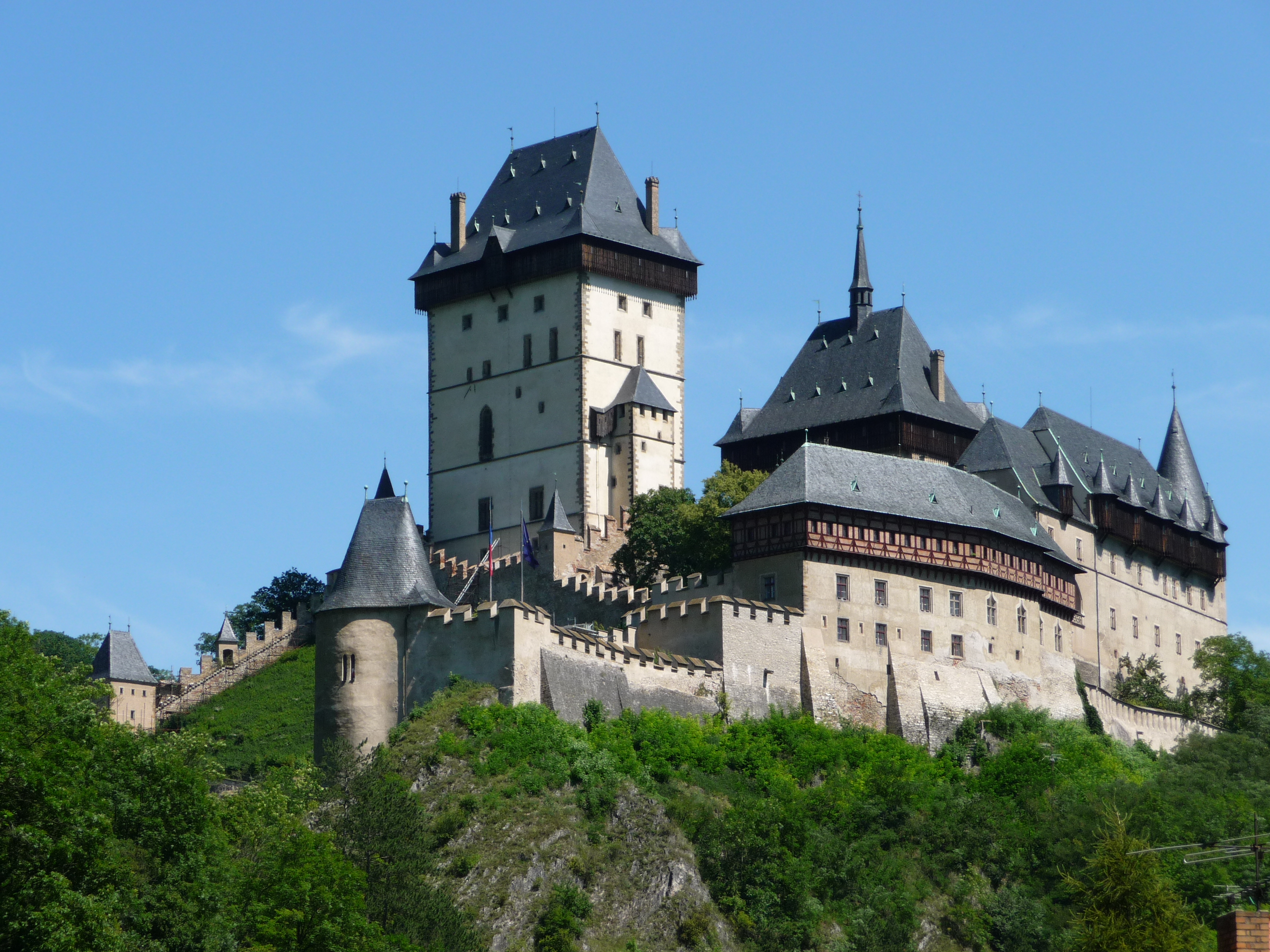
Medieval castle Karlštejn

Prague is the fifth most visited city in Europe. In 2001, the total earnings from tourism reached 118 billion CZK, making up 5.5% of GNP and 9% of its overall export earnings. The industry employs more than 110,000 people – over 1% of the population. Guidebooks and tourists reporting overcharging by taxi drivers and pickpocketing problems talk mainly about Prague, though the situation has improved recently. Prague's mayor, Pavel Bém, worked to improve this reputation by cracking down on petty crime and, aside from these problems, Prague is a "safe" city. The crime rate is described by the United States State department as "low".

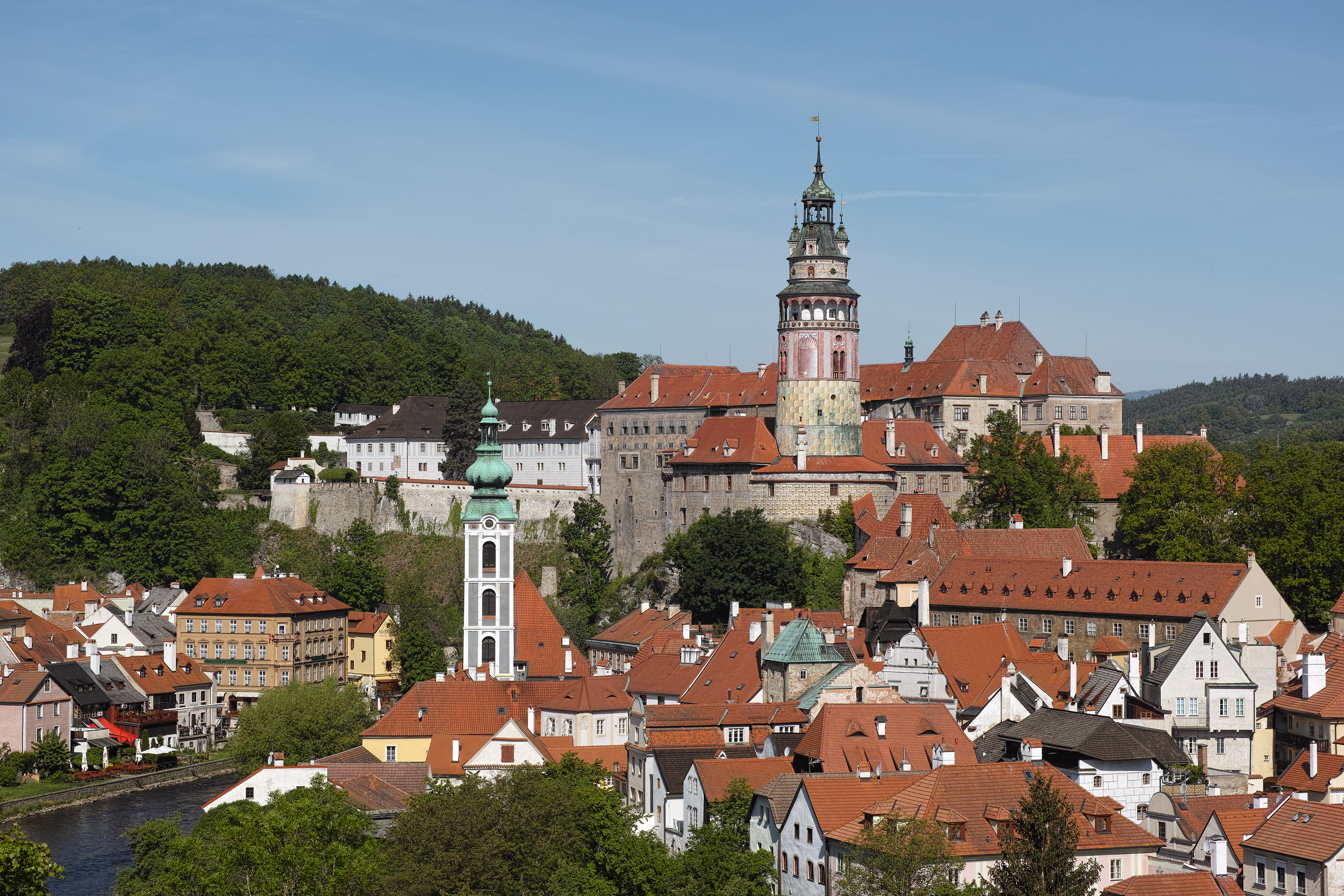
Český Krumlov

The Czech Republic boasts 17 UNESCO World Heritage Sites, 3 of them being transnational. As of 2024, further 13 sites are on the tentative list. Architectural heritage is an object of interest to visitors – it includes castles and châteaux from different historical epochs, namely Karlštejn Castle, Český Krumlov and the Lednice–Valtice Cultural Landscape. There are 12 cathedrals and 15 churches elevated to the rank of basilica by the pope, as well as many monasteries.

Away from the towns, areas such as Bohemian Paradise, Bohemian Forest and the Giant Mountains attract visitors seeking outdoor pursuits. The country is also known for its various museums, puppetry and marionette exhibitions that take part within larger puppet festivals, and beer festivals. Aquapalace Prague in Čestlice is the largest water park in the country.

== Science and technology ==
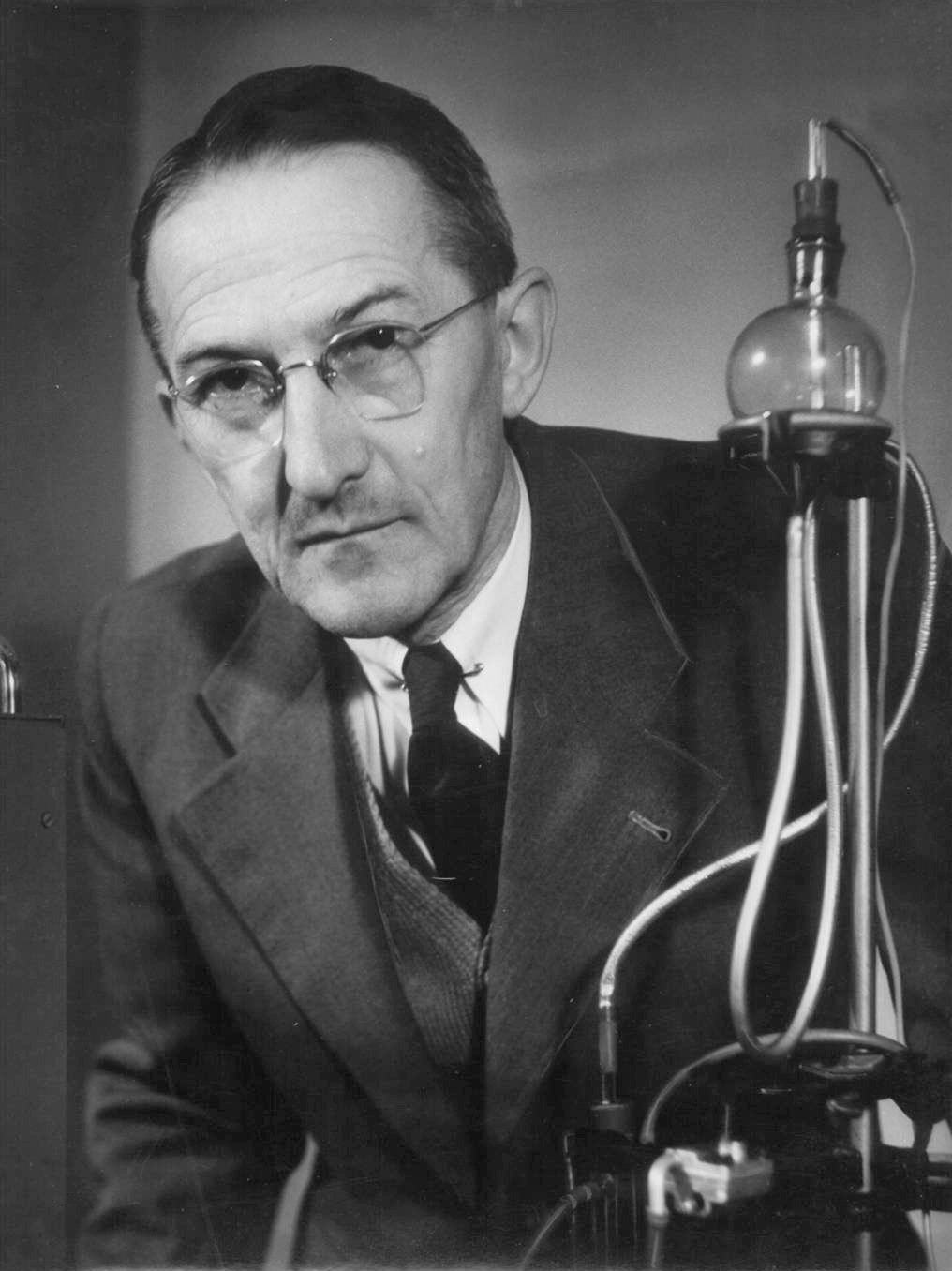
Chemist Jaroslav Heyrovský, Nobel Prize winner

The Czech lands have a long and well-documented history of scientific innovation. Today, the Czech Republic has a developed scientific community supported by the government, industry, and leading universities. Czech scientists are embedded members of the global scientific community. They contribute annually to multiple international academic journals and collaborate with their colleagues across boundaries and fields. The Czech Republic was ranked 24th in the Global Innovation Index in 2020 and 2021, up from 26th in 2019.

Historically, the Czech lands, especially Prague, have been the seat of scientific discovery going back to early modern times, including Tycho Brahe, Nicolaus Copernicus, and Johannes Kepler. In 1784 the scientific community was first formally organized under the charter of the Royal Czech Society of Sciences. Currently, this organization is known as the Czech Academy of Sciences. Similarly, the Czech lands have a well-established history of scientists, including Nobel laureates biochemists Gerty and Carl Ferdinand Cori, chemists Jaroslav Heyrovský (inventor of polarography, electroanalytical chemistry and recipient of the Nobel Prize) and Otto Wichterle (chemists responsible for the invention of the modern contact lens and silon-synthetic fiber), physicists Ernst Mach (physicist and critic of Newton's theories of space and time, foreshadowing Einstein's theory of relativity) and Peter Grünberg, physiologist Jan Evangelista Purkyně and chemist Antonín Holý (scientist and chemist, in 2009 was involved in creation of the most effective drug in the treatment of AIDS), Sigmund Freud, the founder of psychoanalysis, was born in Příbor, Gregor Mendel, the founder of genetics, was born in Hynčice and spent most of his life in Brno, logician and mathematician Kurt Gödel was born in Brno.

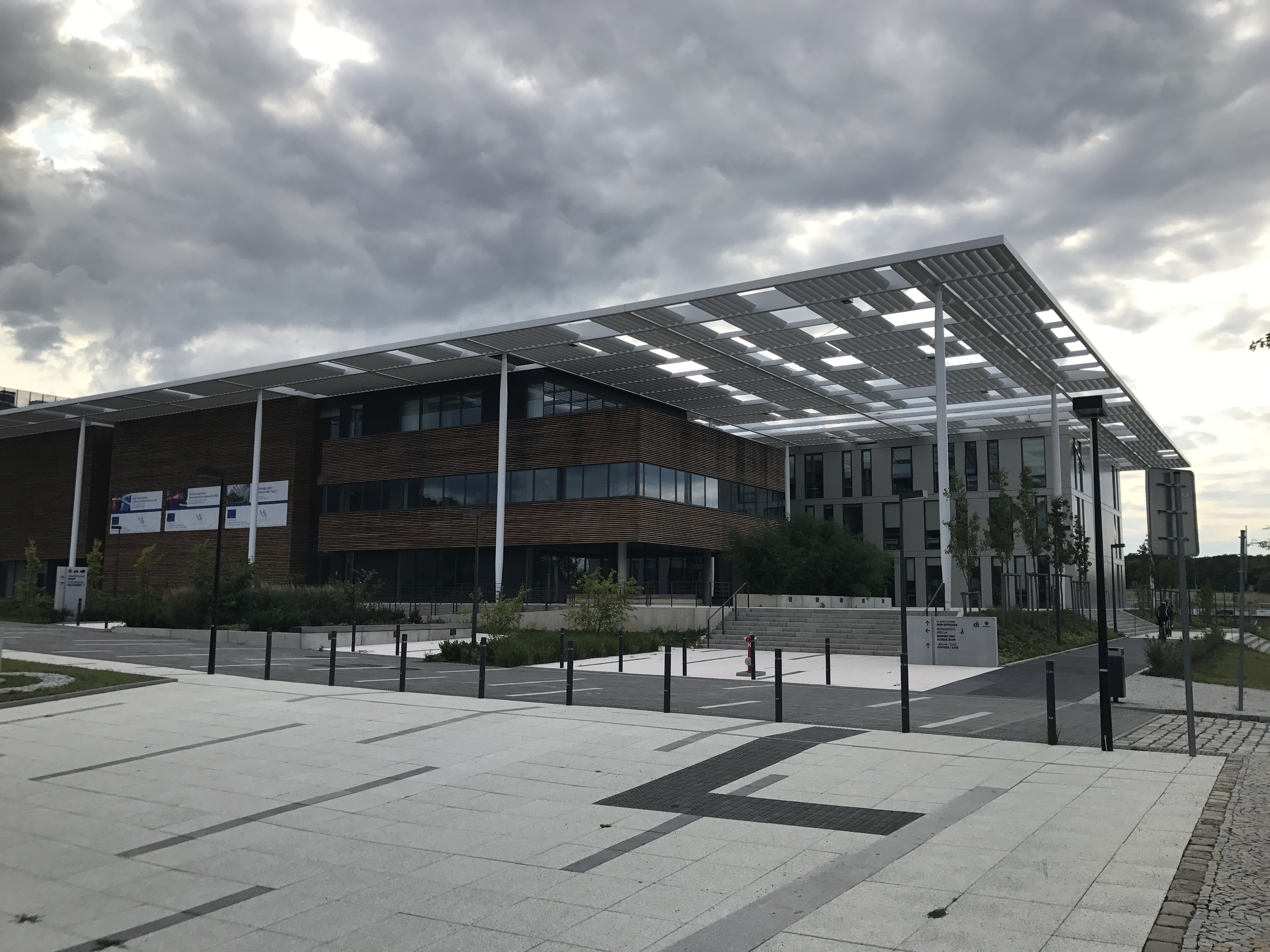
Eli Beamlines Science Center with the most powerful laser in the world in Dolní Břežany

Other famous scientists include: Stanislav Brebera (inventor of the plastic explosive Semtex), Václav Prokop Diviš (inventor of the first grounded lightning rod), Jakub Husník (improved the process of photolithography), Jan Janský (serologist and neurologist, discovered the ABO blood groups), Karel Klíč (painter and photographer, inventor of the photogravure), František Křižík (electrical engineer, inventor of the arc lamp), Jan Marek Marci (mathematician, physicist and imperial physician, one of the founders of spectroscopy), Vladimír Remek (the first person outside of the Soviet Union and the United States to go into space), Jakub Kryštof Rad (inventor of sugar cubes), Josef Ressel (inventor of the screw propeller and modern compass).

Historically, most scientific research was recorded in Latin, but from the 18th century onwards increasingly in German and Czech, archived in libraries supported and managed by religious groups and other denominations, as evidenced by historical locations of international renown and heritage such as the Strahov Monastery and the Clementinum in Prague. Increasingly, scientists publish their work and that of their history in English.

Current important scientific institutions include the Academy of Sciences of the Czech Republic, the CEITEC Institute in Brno and the HiLASE and Eli Beamlines centers with the most powerful laser in the world in Dolní Břežany. Prague is the seat of the administrative center of the GSA Agency operating the European navigation system Galileo and the European Union Agency for the Space Programme.

== Demographics ==
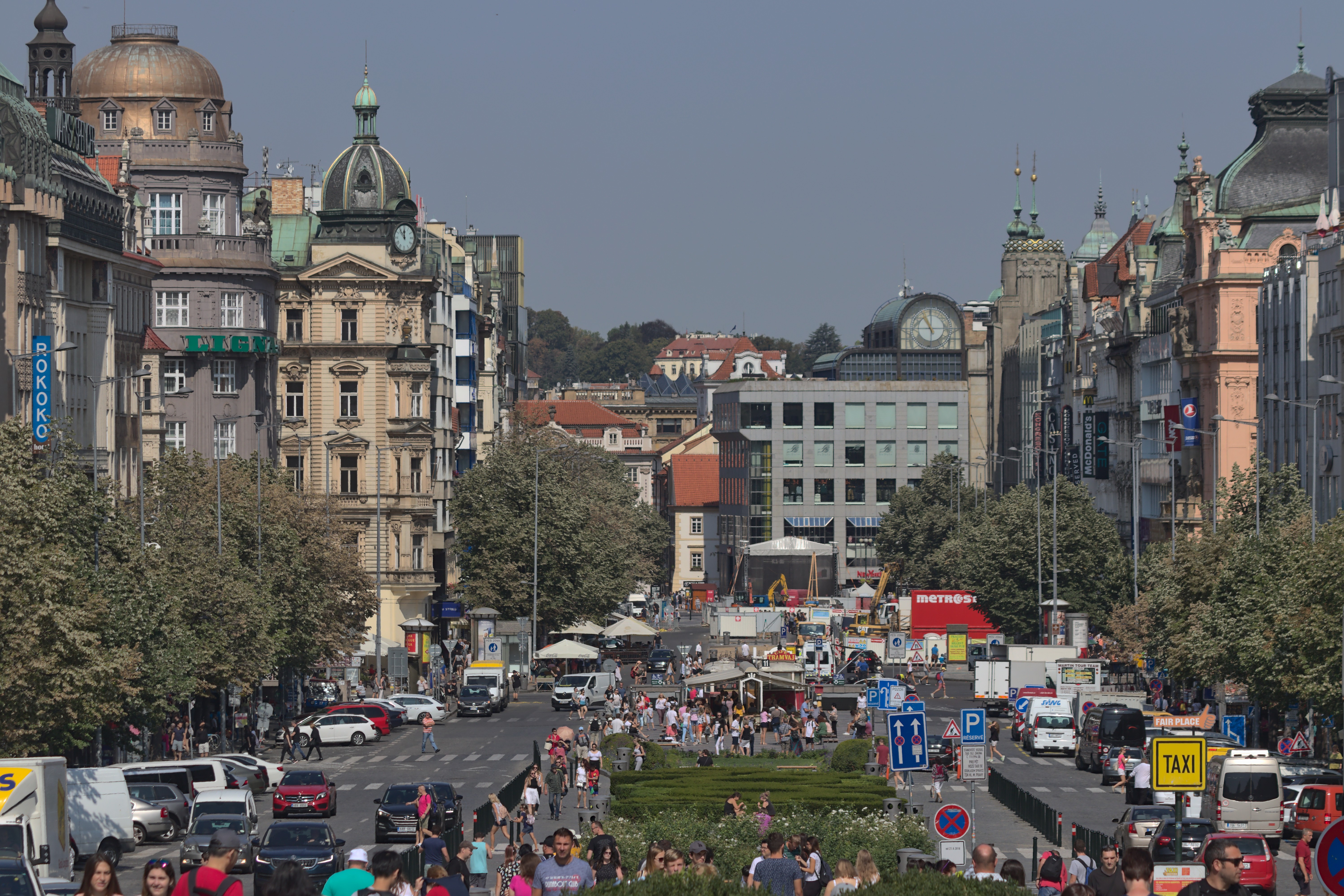
Wenceslas Square experiences the most pedestrian traffic of all areas in Prague

The total fertility rate in 2020 was estimated at 1.71 children per woman, which is below the replacement rate of 2.1. The population has an average age of 43.3 years. The life expectancy in 2021 was estimated to be 79.5 years (76.55 years male, 82.61 years female). In 2024, there were 121,823 immigrants to and 84,978 emigrants from the Czech Republic, for a net migration of 36,845, of whom 17 thousand were Ukrainian and 4.7 thousand were Slovak. Vietnamese immigrants began settling in the country during the Communist period, when they were invited as guest workers by the Czechoslovak government. In 2009, there were about 70,000 Vietnamese in the Czech Republic. Most have decided to stay in the country permanently.

According to results of the 2021 census, the majority of the inhabitants are Czechs (57.3%), followed by Moravians (3.4%), Slovaks (0.9%), Ukrainians (0.7%), Viets (0.3%), Poles (0.3%), Russians (0.2%), Silesians (0.1%) and Germans (0.1%). Another 4.0% declared a combination of two nationalities (3.6% combination of Czech and other nationality). As the 'nationality' was an optional item, a number of people left this field blank (31.6%). According to some estimates, there are about 250,000 Romani people in the Czech Republic. The Polish minority resides mainly in the Trans-Olza region.

There were 658,564 foreigners residing in the country in 2021, according to the Czech Statistical Office, with the largest groups being Ukrainian (22%), Slovak (22%), Vietnamese (12%), Russian (7%) and German (4%). Most of the foreign population lives in Prague (37.3%) and Central Bohemia Region (13.2%).

The Jewish population of Bohemia and Moravia, 118,000 according to the 1930 census, was nearly annihilated by the Nazi Germans during the Holocaust. There were approximately 3,900 Jews in 2021. Former Prime Minister Jan Fischer is of Jewish faith. Nationality of residents, who answered the question in the Census 2021:

Nationality	Share
Czech	83.76%
Moravian	4.99%
Czech and Moravian	2.50%
Slovak	1.33%
Ukrainian	1.08%
Czech and Slovak	0.82%
Vietnamese	0.44%
Polish	0.37%
Russian	0.35%
Other	4.36%

=== Largest cities ===
Largest municipalities in the Czech Republic Czech Statistical Office – 1 January 2026
Rank	Name	Region	Pop.	Rank	Name	Region	Pop.
1	Prague	Prague	1,407,084	11	Zlín	Zlín	74,917
2	Brno	South Moravian	404,296	12	Kladno	Central Bohemian	69,728
3	Ostrava	Moravian-Silesian	280,853	13	Havířov	Moravian-Silesian	67,998
4	Plzeň	Plzeň	187,863	14	Most	Ústí nad Labem	63,160
5	Liberec	Liberec	108,214	15	Opava	Moravian-Silesian	54,881
6	Olomouc	Olomouc	105,297	16	Jihlava	Vysočina	53,686
7	České Budějovice	South Bohemian	97,128	17	Frýdek-Místek	Moravian-Silesian	53,164
8	Hradec Králové	Hradec Králové	93,534	18	Teplice	Ústí nad Labem	50,856
9	Pardubice	Pardubice	92,713	19	Karlovy Vary	Karlovy Vary	48,788
10	Ústí nad Labem	Ústí nad Labem	90,035	20	Karviná	Moravian-Silesian	48,937

=== Religion ===
Religion in the Czech Republic (2011)
Undeclared	44.7%
Irreligion	34.5%
Catholicism	10.5%
Believers, not members of other religions	6.8%
Other Christian churches	1.1%
Protestantism	1%
Believers, members of other religions	0.7%
Other religions / Unknown	0.7%

About 75% to 79% of residents do not declare having any religion or faith in surveys, and the proportion of convinced atheists (30%) is the third highest in the world behind those of China (47%) and Japan (31%). The Czech people have been historically characterized as "tolerant and even indifferent towards religion". The religious identity of the country has changed drastically since the first half of the 20th century, when more than 90% of Czechs were Christians.

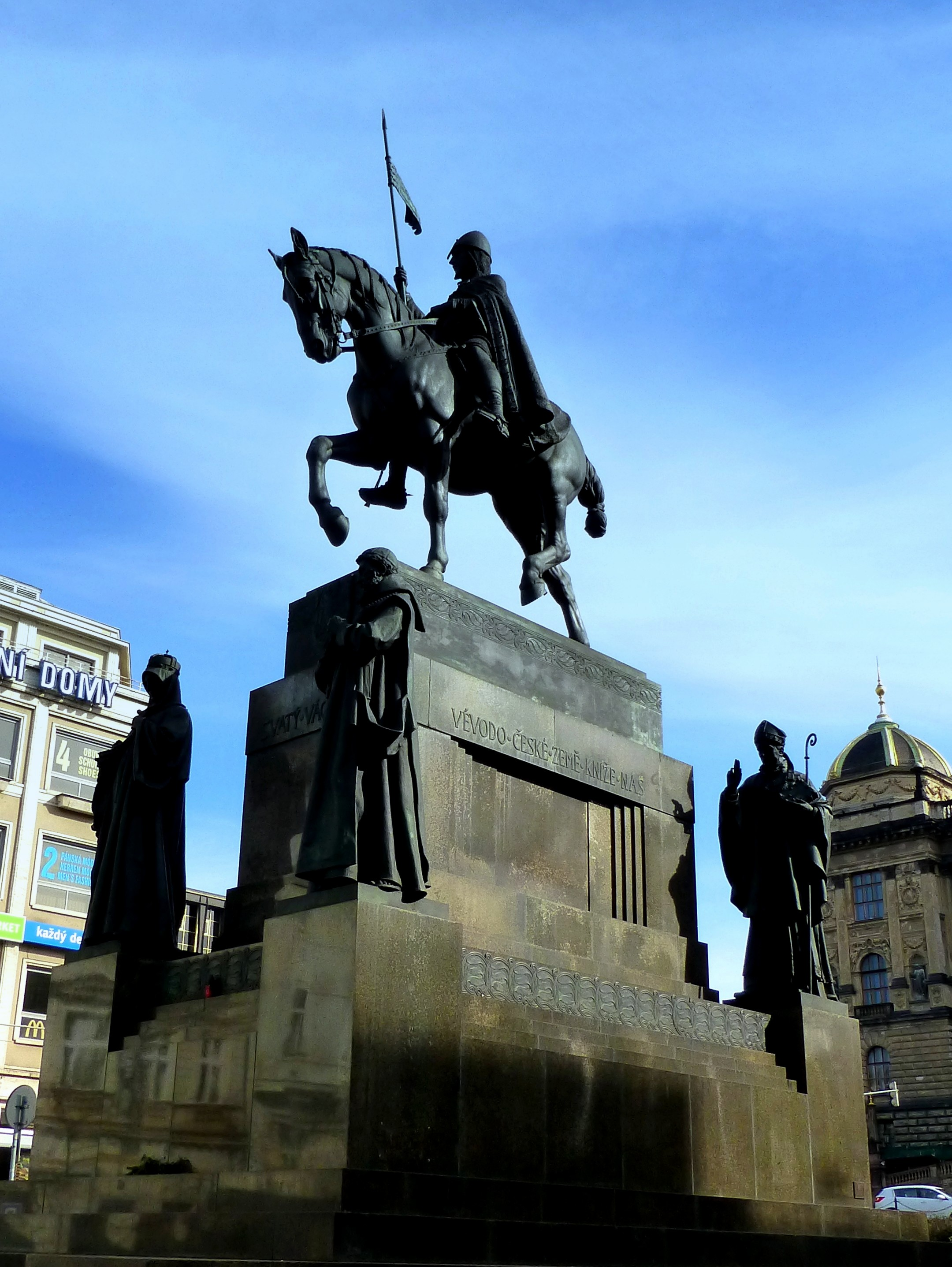
Saint Wenceslaus is the patron saint of the Czech lands

Christianization took place in the 9th and 10th centuries. After the Bohemian Reformation, most Czechs became followers of Jan Hus, Petr Chelčický and other regional Protestant Reformers. Taborites and Utraquists were Hussite groups. Towards the end of the Hussite Wars, the Utraquists changed sides and allied with the Roman Catholic Church. Following the joint Utraquist—Roman Catholic victory, Utraquism was accepted as a distinct form of Christianity to be practiced in Bohemia by the Roman Catholic Church while all remaining Hussite groups were prohibited. After the Reformation, some Bohemians went with the teachings of Martin Luther, especially Sudeten Germans.

In the wake of the Reformation, Utraquist Hussites took a renewed increasingly anti-Catholic stance, while some of the defeated Hussite factions were revived. After the Habsburgs regained control of Bohemia, the whole population was forcibly converted to Roman Catholicism—even the Utraquist Hussites. Going forward, Czechs have become more wary and pessimistic of religion as such. A history of resistance to the Roman Catholic Church followed. It suffered a schism with the neo-Hussite Czechoslovak Hussite Church in 1920, lost the bulk of its adherents during the Communist era and continues to lose in the modern, ongoing secularization. Protestantism never recovered after the Counter-Reformation was introduced by the Austrian Habsburgs in 1620.

Prior to the Holocaust, the Czech Republic had a sizable Jewish community of around 100,000. There are many historically important and culturally relevant synagogues in the Czech Republic such as Europe's oldest active synagogue, the Old New Synagogue, and the second largest synagogue in Europe, the Great Synagogue (Plzeň). The Holocaust decimated Czech Jewry, and the Jewish population as of 2021 is 3,900.

According to the 2011 census, 34% of the population stated they had no religion, 10.3% were Roman Catholic, 0.8% were Protestant (0.5% Czech Brethren and 0.4% Hussite), and 9% followed other forms of religion both denominational or not (of which 863 people answered they are pagan). 45% of the population did not answer the question about religion. From 1991 to 2001 and further to 2011 the adherence to Roman Catholicism decreased from 39% to 27% and then to 10%; Protestantism similarly declined from 3.7% to 2% and then to 0.8%. The Muslim population is estimated to be 20,000 representing 0.2% of the population. The proportion of religious believers varies significantly across the country, from 55% in Zlín Region to 16% in Ústí nad Labem Region.

=== Languages ===
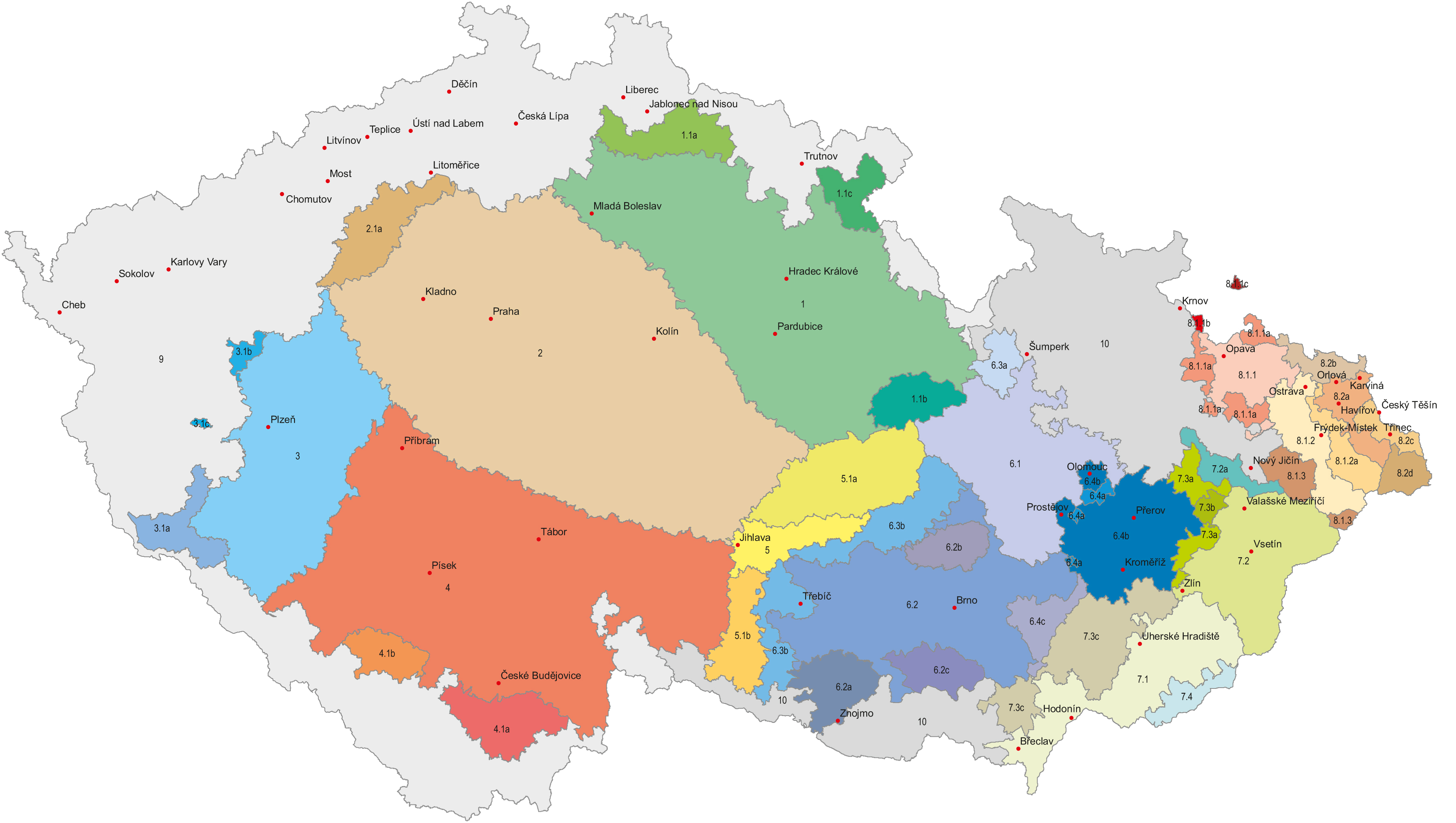
Dialects of Czech, Moravian, Lach, and Cieszyn Silesian spoken in the Czech Republic. Mixed Czech dialects are spoken in the grey area, which used to be predominantly German-speaking until 1945.

The official language is Czech, a West Slavic language traditionally divided into four principal dialect groups that shares a very high mutual intelligibility with the Slovak language. Although the constitution does not specify an official language of the republic, Czech is spoken as sole mother tongue by 92% to 98% of the population depending on the survey, making the Czech Republic one of the most linguistically homogeneous countries in Europe.

The government recognizes 14 national minorities, whose respective languages are protected. Until 1945, German was the mother tongue of over 30% of the people. Today, only Polish is geographically concentrated enough to result in significant language infrastructure, including bilingual place names in the Cieszyn Silesia region.

Among foreign languages, English has drastically increased in popularity since 1990 and is studied by over 98% of public school students. German is the principal second foreign language and studied by about 50% of students, a value that has remained stable over the past decades. Russian has been significantly declining in popularity since 1990 and is now studied by less than 20% of students, while French and Spanish have gradually increased in popularity to about 6-8% each. The 2024 Eurobarometer poll reported 41% feeling proficient in English, 12% in German, and 6.5% in Russian.

=== Education and health care ===
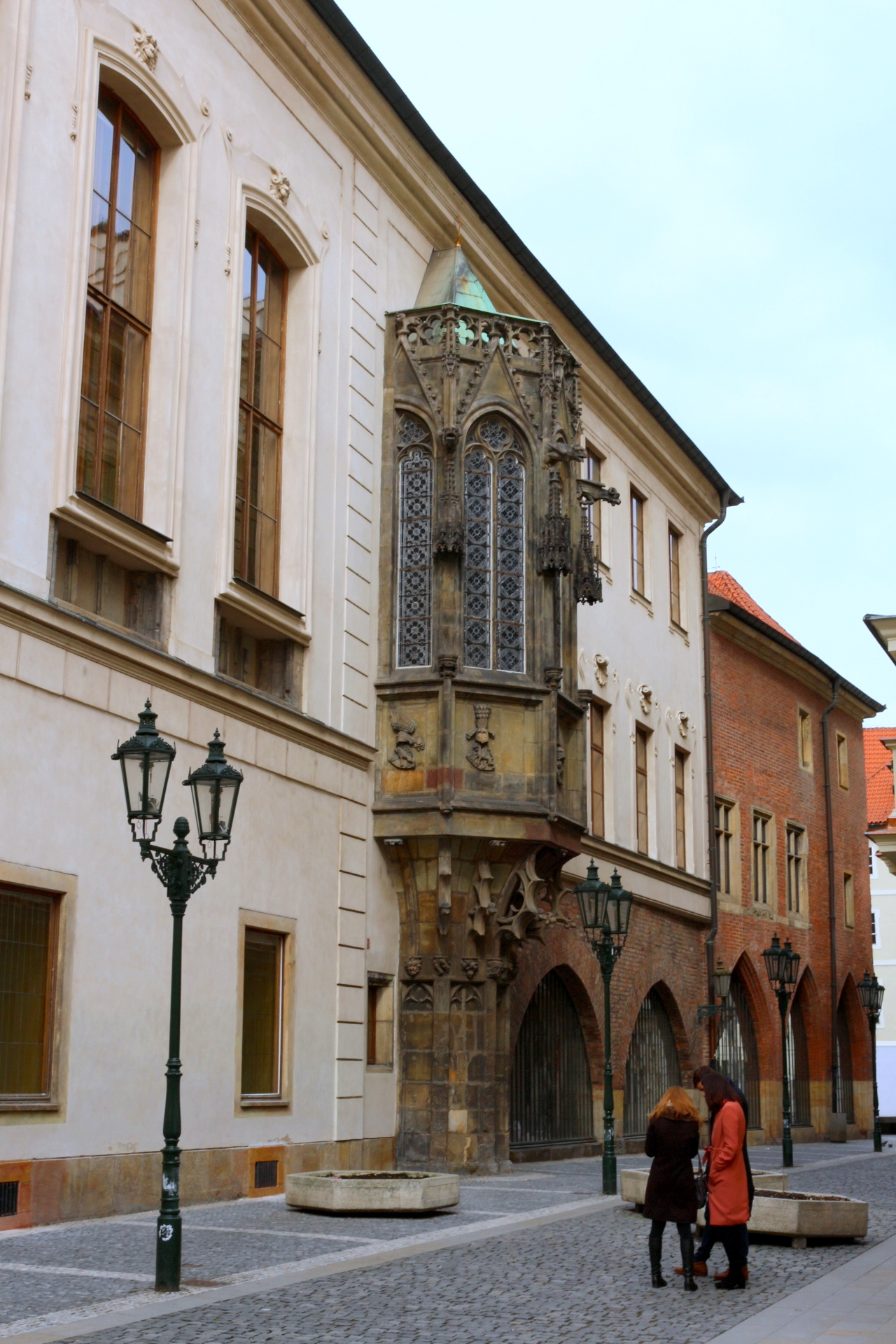
Charles University is the oldest university in Central Europe

Education in the Czech Republic is compulsory for nine years, and citizens have access to a free-tuition university education, while the average number of years of education is 13.1. Additionally, the Czech Republic has a "relatively equal" educational system in comparison with other countries in Europe. Founded in 1348, Charles University was the first university in Central Europe. Other major universities are Masaryk University, Czech Technical University, Palacký University, Academy of Performing Arts and University of Economics.

The Programme for International Student Assessment, coordinated by the OECD, currently ranks the education system as the 15th most successful in the world, higher than the OECD average. The UN Education Index ranked the Czech Republic 10th as of 2013.

Healthcare in the Czech Republic is similar in quality to that of other developed nations. The universal health care system is based on a compulsory insurance model, with fee-for-service care funded by mandatory employment-related insurance plans. According to the 2016 Euro health consumer index, a comparison of healthcare in Europe, the Czech healthcare is 13th.

== Culture ==
=== Art ===
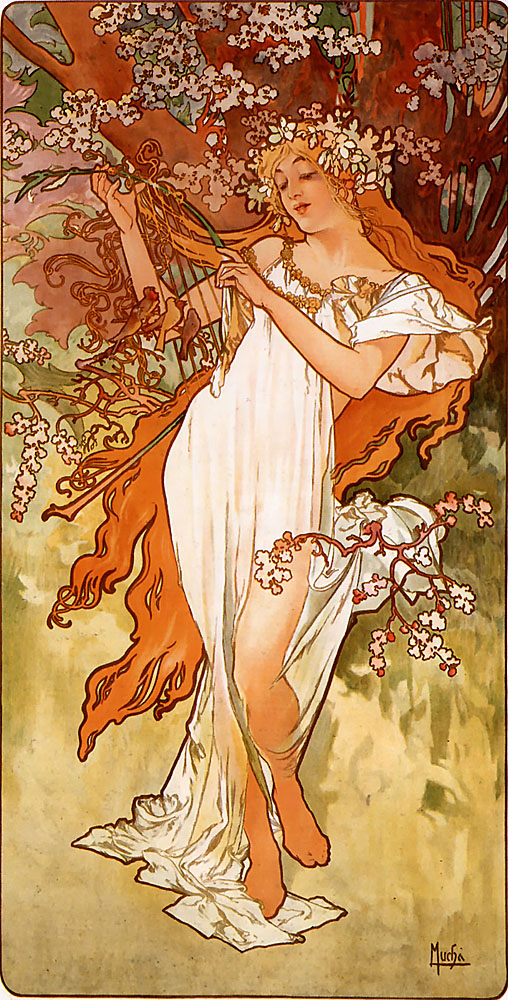
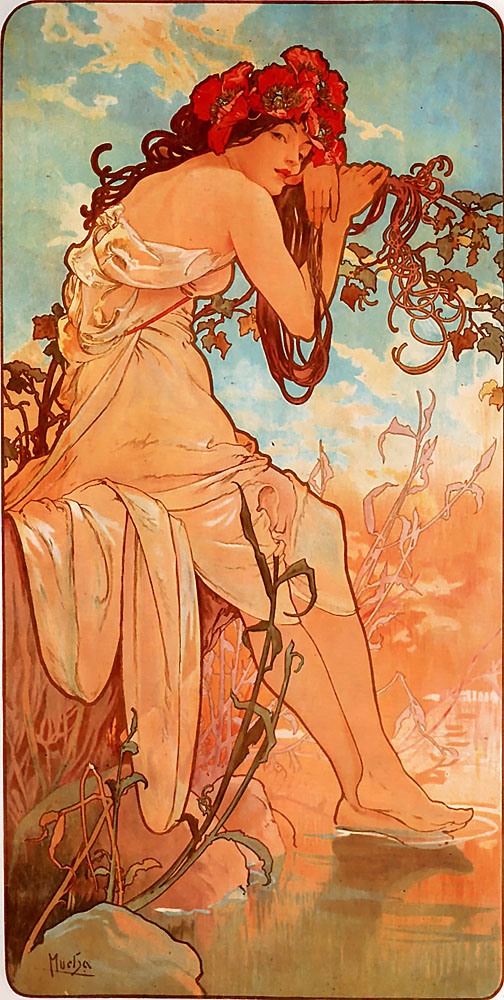
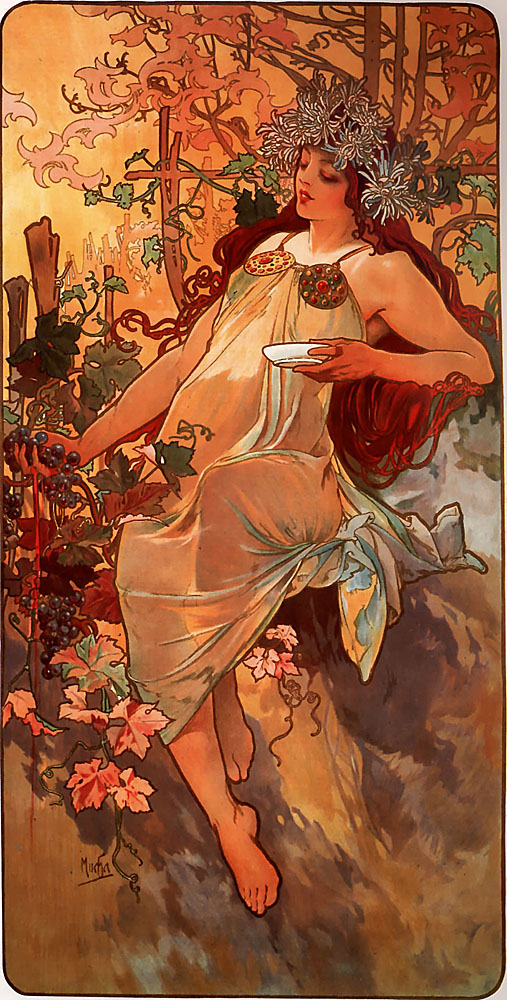
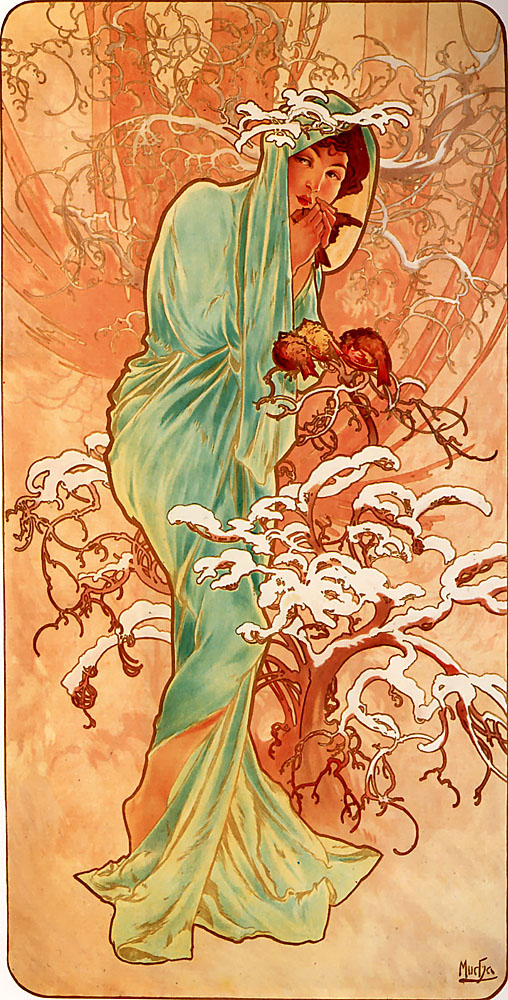
Spring, Summer, Autumn and Winter (1896) by Art Nouveau artist Alphonse Mucha

Venus of Dolní Věstonice is an important example of prehistoric art unearthed in the region. Theodoric of Prague was a painter in the Gothic era who decorated the castle Karlštejn. In the Baroque era, there were painters Wenceslaus Hollar, Jan Kupecký, Karel Škréta, Anton Raphael Mengs and Petr Brandl and sculptors Matthias Braun and Ferdinand Brokoff.

In the first half of the 19th century, Josef Mánes joined the romantic movement. In the second half the so-called "National Theatre generation" rose to prominence: sculptor Josef Václav Myslbek and painters Mikoláš Aleš, Václav Brožík, Vojtěch Hynais and Julius Mařák. At the end of the century came Art Nouveau, with Alfons Mucha becoming its main representative. He is known for his Art Nouveau posters and a cycle of 20 large canvases named the Slav Epic, which depicts the history of Czechs and other Slavs. As of 2012, it can be seen in the Veletržní Palace of the National Gallery in Prague, which manages the largest collection of art in the Czech Republic. Max Švabinský was another Art Nouveau painter.

The 20th century brought an avant-garde revolution, represented in the Czech lands mainly by expressionists and cubists: Josef Čapek, Emil Filla, Bohumil Kubišta or Jan Zrzavý. Surrealism emerged particularly through the work of Toyen, Josef Šíma and Karel Teige. In the world, however, the most well-known Czech avant-garde artist might be František Kupka, a pioneer of abstract painting. Illustrators and cartoonists to gain fame in the first half of the 20th century include Josef Lada, Zdeněk Burian or Emil Orlík. Art photography became a new field represented by František Drtikol, Josef Sudek, later Jan Saudek and Josef Koudelka.

The Czech Republic is also known for its individually made, mouth-blown, and decorated Bohemian glass.

=== Architecture ===
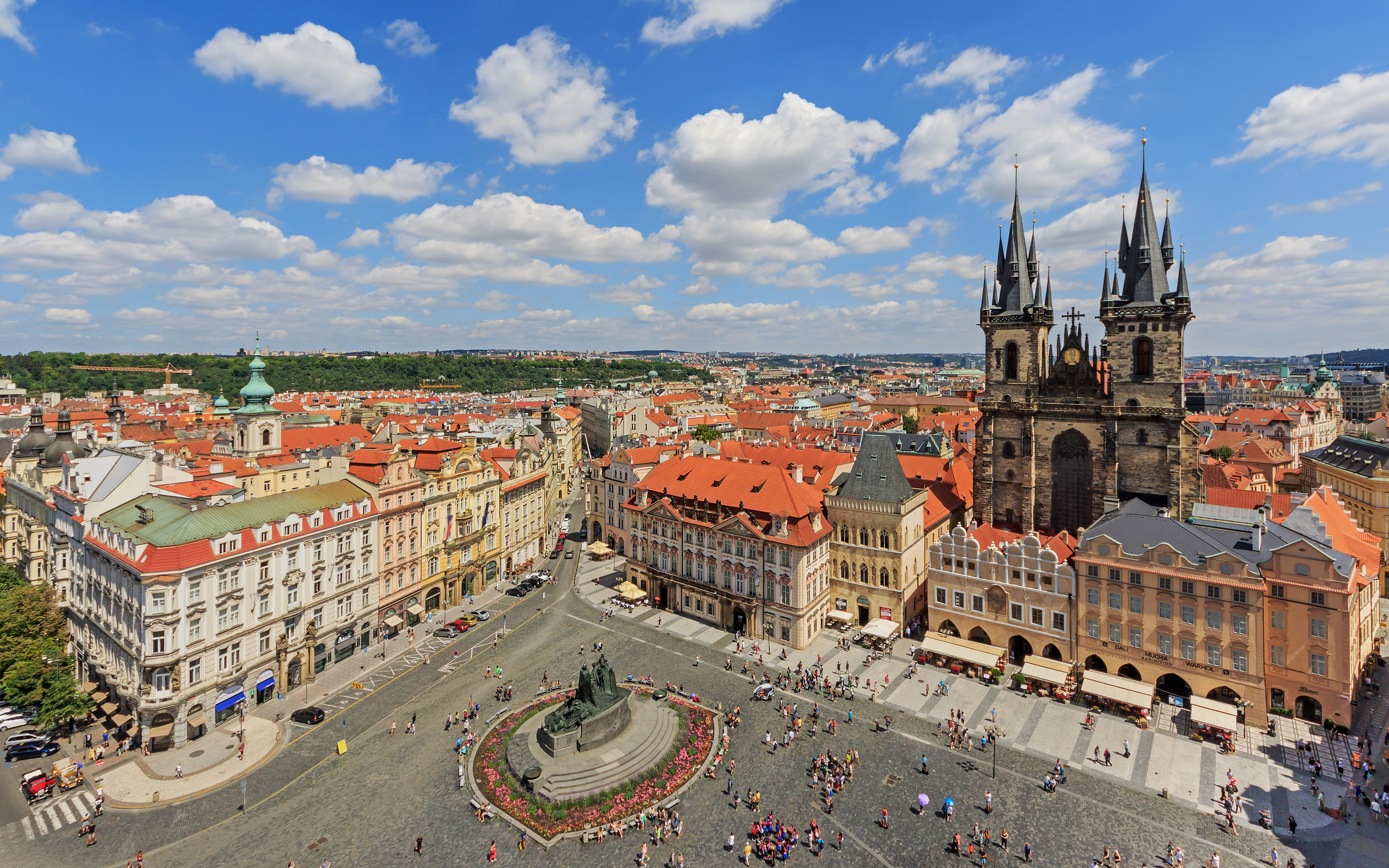
Historic center of Prague

The earliest preserved stone buildings in Bohemia and Moravia date back to the time of the Christianization in the 9th and 10th centuries. Since the Middle Ages, the Czech lands have been using the same architectural styles as most of Western and Central Europe. The oldest still standing churches were built in the Romanesque style. During the 13th century, it was replaced by the Gothic style. In the 14th century, Emperor Charles IV invited architects from France and Germany, Matthias of Arras and Peter Parler, to his court in Prague. During the Middle Ages, some fortified castles were built by the king and aristocracy, as well as some monasteries.

The Renaissance style penetrated the Bohemian Crown in the late 15th century when the older Gothic style started to be mixed with Renaissance elements. An example of pure Renaissance architecture in Bohemia is the Queen Anne's Summer Palace, which was situated in the garden of Prague Castle. Evidence of the general reception of the Renaissance in Bohemia, involving an influx of Italian architects, can be found in spacious chateaus with arcade courtyards and geometrically arranged gardens. Emphasis was placed on comfort, and buildings that were built for entertainment purposes also appeared.

In the 17th century, the Baroque style spread throughout the Crown of Bohemia.

In the 18th century, Bohemia produced an architectural peculiarity – the Baroque Gothic style, a synthesis of the Gothic and Baroque styles.

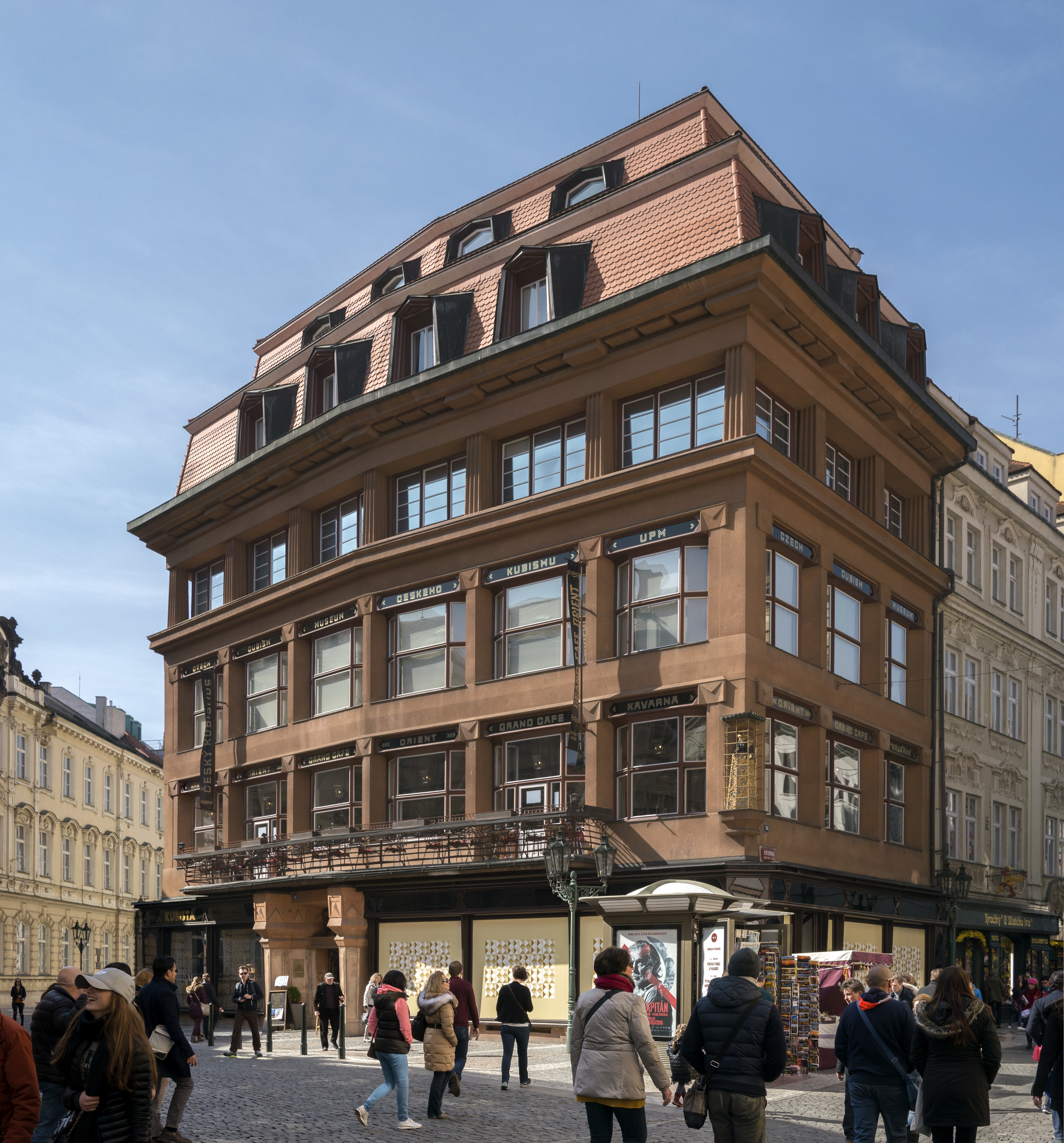
Czech artists developed a distinct cubist style in architecture and applied arts. It later evolved into national Czechoslovak style, rondocubism.

During the 19th century stands the revival architectural styles. Some churches were restored to their presumed medieval appearance and there were constructed buildings in the Neo-Romanesque, Neo-Gothic and Neo-Renaissance styles. At the turn of the 19th and 20th centuries, the new art style appeared in the Czech lands – Art Nouveau.

Bohemia contributed an unusual style to the world's architectural heritage when Czech architects attempted to transpose the Cubism of painting and sculpture into architecture.

Between World Wars I and II, Functionalism, with its sober, progressive forms, took over as the main architectural style.

After World War II and the Communist coup in 1948, art in Czechoslovakia became Soviet-influenced. The Czechoslovak avant-garde artistic movement is known as the Brussels style came up in the time of political liberalization of Czechoslovakia in the 1960s. Brutalism dominated in the 1970s and 1980s.

The Czech Republic is not shying away from the more modern trends of international architecture, an example is the Dancing House (Tančící dům) in Prague, Golden Angel in Prague or Congress Centre in Zlín.

=== Literature ===
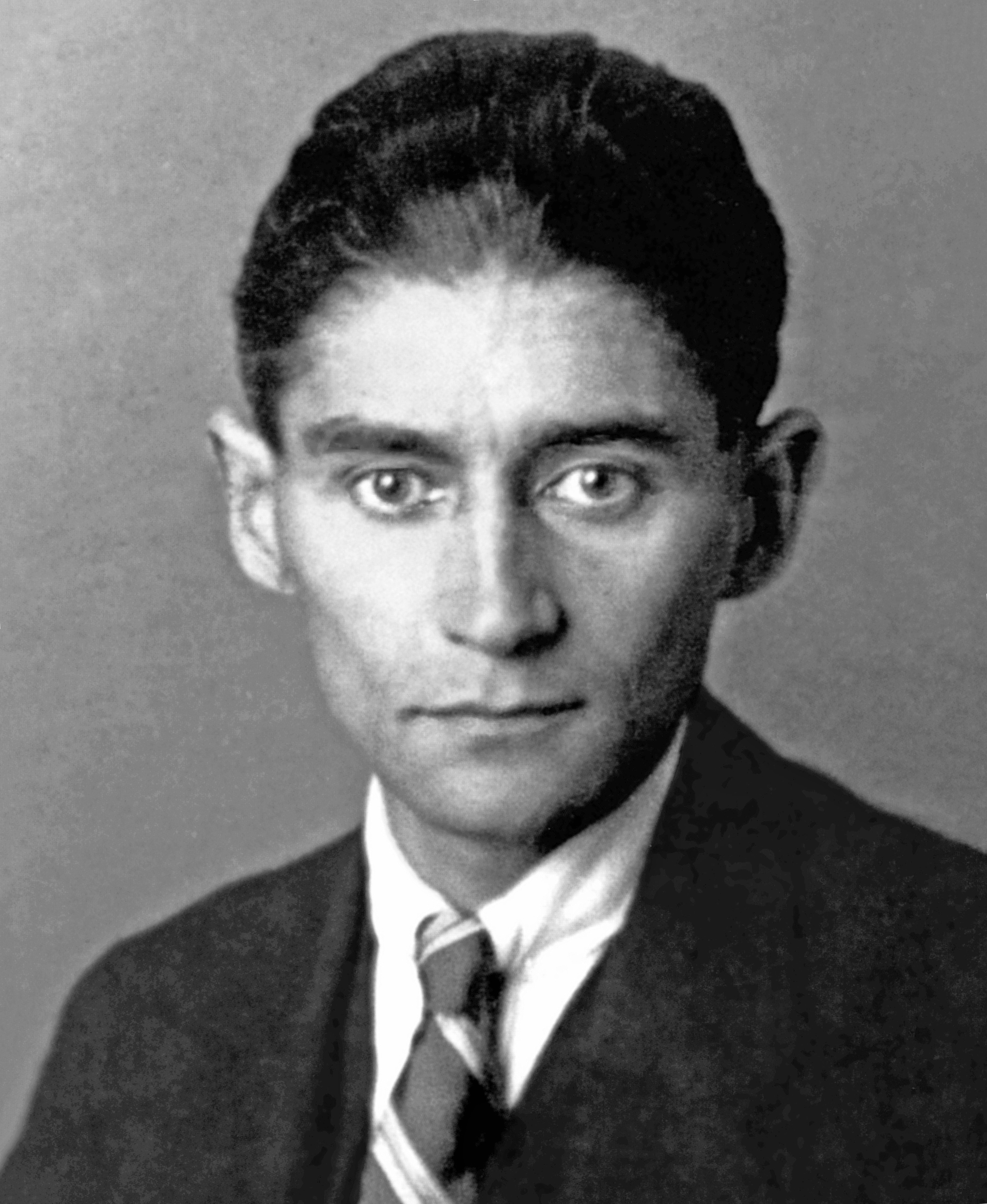
Franz Kafka

The literature from the area of today's Czech Republic was mostly written in Czech, but also in Latin and German or even Old Church Slavonic. Franz Kafka, although a competent user of Czech, wrote in his mother tongue, German. His works include The Trial and The Castle.

In the second half of the 13th century, the royal court in Prague became one of the centers of German Minnesang and courtly literature. The Czech German-language literature can be seen in the first half of the 20th century.

Bible translations played a role in the development of Czech literature. The oldest Czech translation of the Psalms originated in the late 13th century and the first complete Czech translation of the Bible was finished around 1360. The first complete printed Czech Bible was published in 1488. The first complete Czech Bible translation from the original languages was published between 1579 and 1593. The Codex Gigas from the 12th century is the largest extant medieval manuscript in the world.

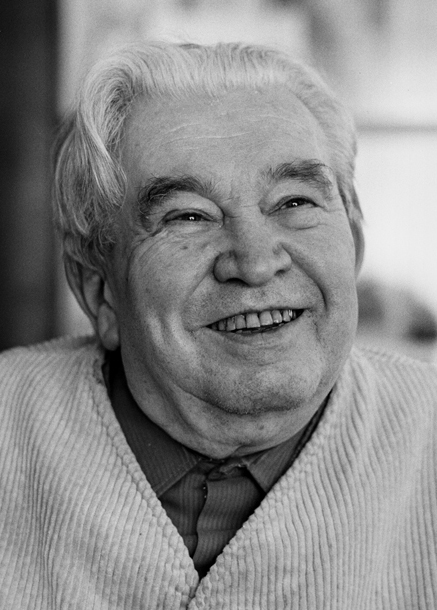
Jaroslav Seifert, winner of the Nobel Prize for Literature

Czech-language literature can be divided into several periods: the Middle Ages; the Hussite period; the Renaissance humanism; the Baroque period; the Enlightenment and Czech reawakening in the first half of the 19th century, modern literature in the second half of the 19th century; the avant-garde of the interwar period; the years under Communism; and the Czech Republic.

The antiwar comedy novel The Good Soldier Švejk is the most translated Czech book in history.

The international literary award the Franz Kafka Prize is awarded in the Czech Republic.

The Czech Republic has the densest network of libraries in Europe.

Czech literature and culture played a role on at least two occasions when Czechs lived under oppression and political activity was suppressed. On both of these occasions, in the early 19th century and then again in the 1960s, the Czechs used their cultural and literary effort to strive for political freedom, establishing a confident, politically aware nation.

=== Music ===
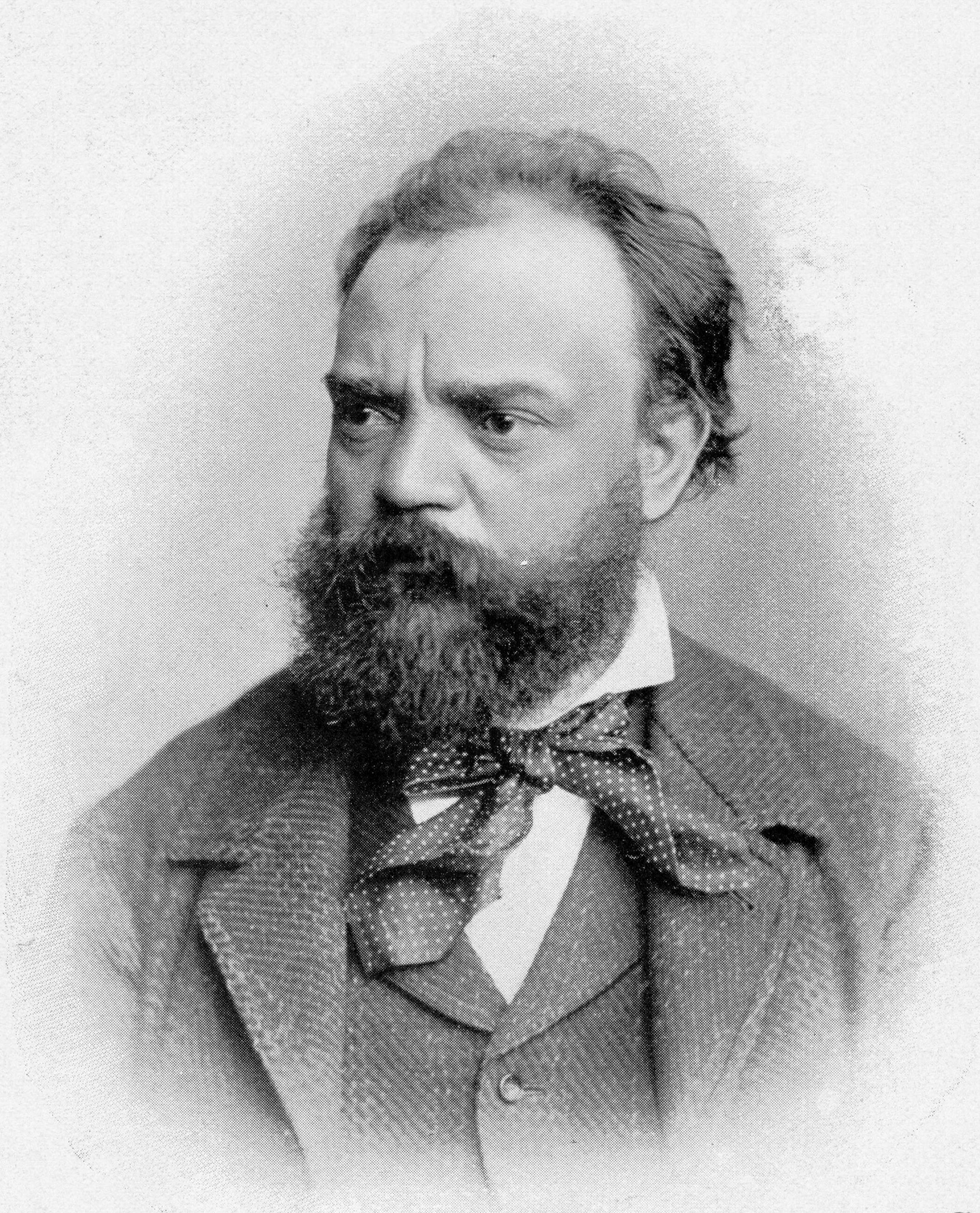
Antonín Dvořák

The musical tradition of the Czech lands arose from the first church hymns, whose first evidence is suggested at the break of the 10th and 11th centuries. Some pieces of Czech music include two chorales, which in their time performed the function of anthems: "Lord, Have Mercy on Us" and the hymn "Saint Wenceslaus" or "Saint Wenceslaus Chorale". The authorship of the anthem "Lord, Have Mercy on Us" is ascribed by some historians to Saint Adalbert of Prague (sv.Vojtěch), bishop of Prague, living between 956 and 997.

The wealth of musical culture lies in the classical music tradition during all historical periods, especially in the Baroque, Classicism, Romantic, modern classical music and in the traditional folk music of Bohemia, Moravia and Silesia. Since the early era of artificial music, Czech musicians and composers have been influenced the folk music of the region and dance.

Czech music can be considered to have been contributed strongly to the development of music in both the European and worldwide contexts, having several times co-determined or even determined a newly arriving era in musical art, above all of the Classical era, as well as by original attitudes in Baroque, Romantic and modern classical music. Czech music burst onto the world stage in the romantic era beginning with the works of Bedřich Smetana who is often considered the 'father of Czech music'. Some Czech musical works are The Bartered Bride (Smetana), New World Symphony (Dvořák), and Sinfonietta and Jenůfa by Janáček.

A music festival in the country is Prague Spring International Music Festival of classical music, a permanent showcase for performing artists, symphony orchestras and chamber music ensembles of the world.

=== Theatre ===
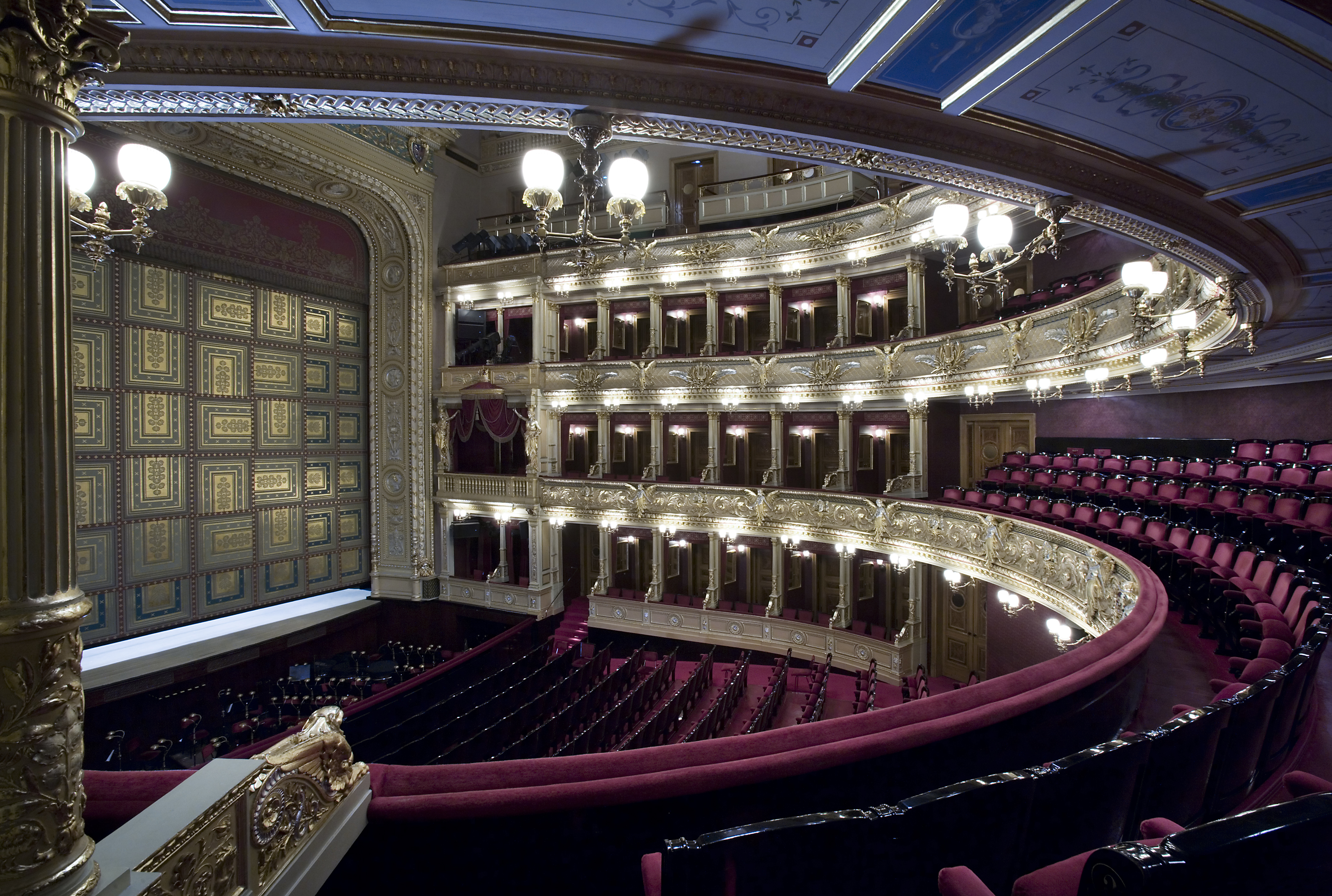
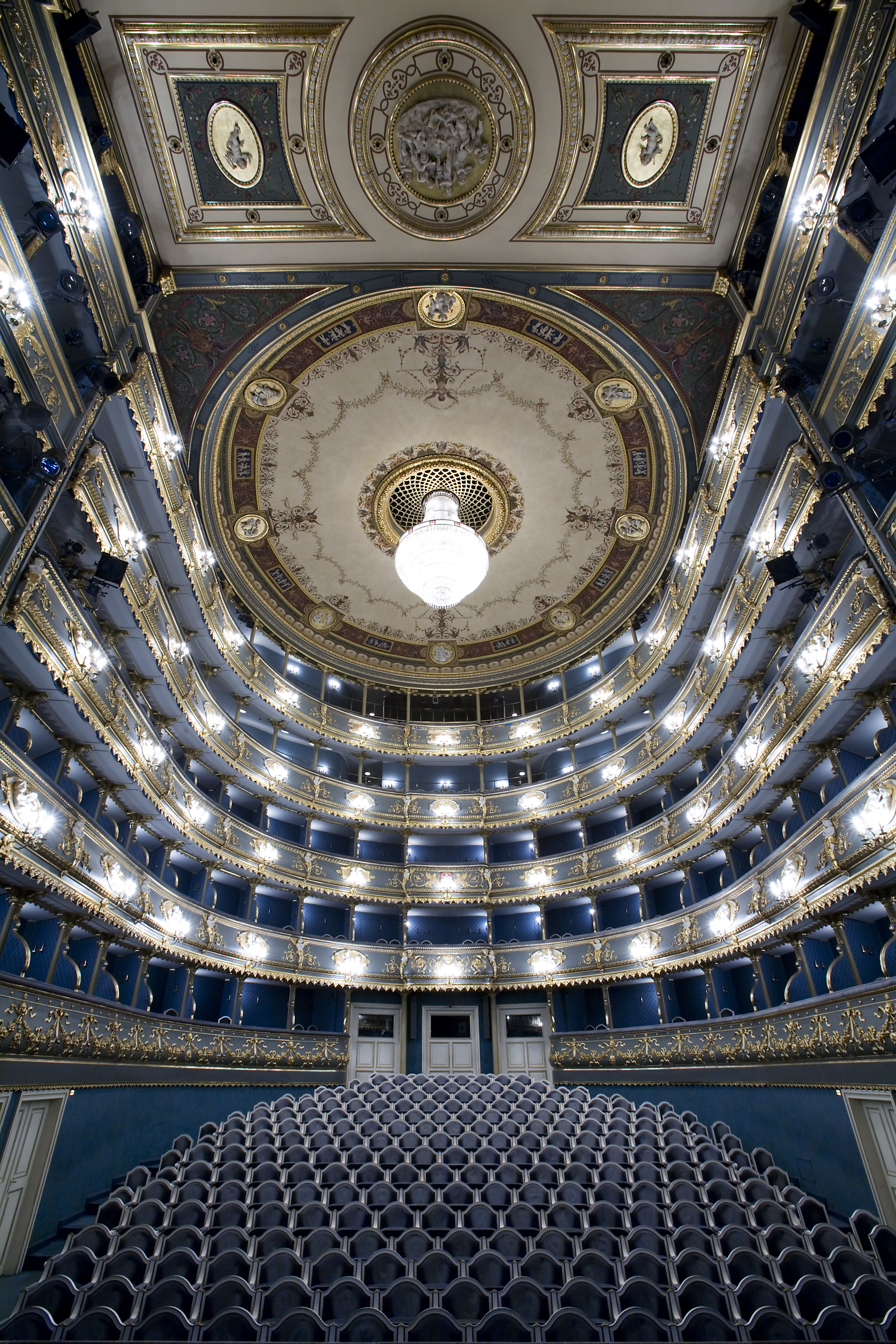
The National Theatre (left) and the Estates Theatre (right)

The roots of Czech theatre can be found in the Middle Ages, especially in the cultural life of the Gothic period. In the 19th century, the theatre played a role in the national awakening movement and later, in the 20th century, it became a part of modern European theatre art. The original Czech cultural phenomenon came into being at the end of the 1950s. This project called Laterna magika, resulting in productions that combined theater, dance, and film in a poetic manner, considered the first multimedia art project in an international context.

One drama is Karel Čapek's play R.U.R., which introduced the word "robot".

The country has a tradition of puppet theater. In 2016, Czech and Slovak Puppetry was included on the UNESCO Intangible Cultural Heritage Lists.

=== Film ===
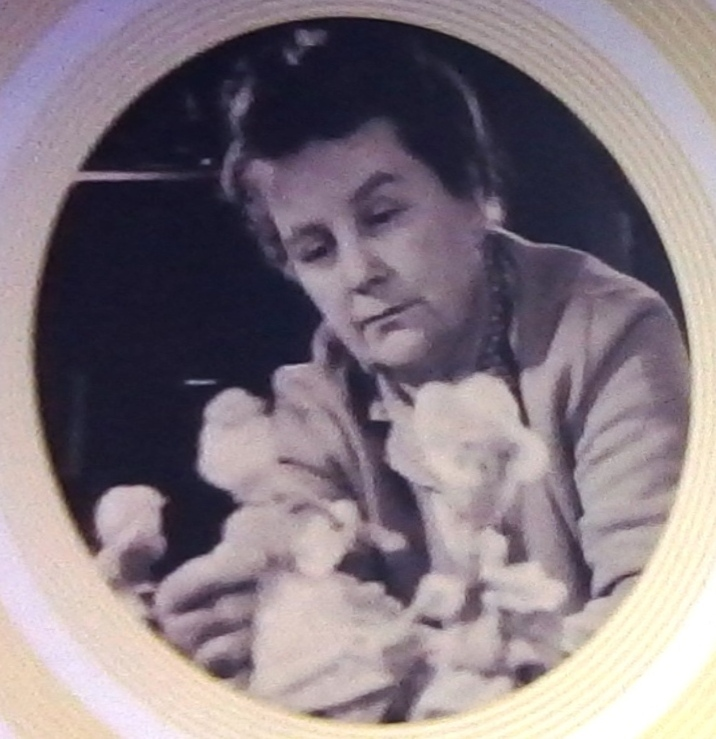
Hermína Týrlová, animator and film director

The tradition of Czech cinematography started in the second half of the 1890s. Peaks of the production in the era of silent movies include the historical drama The Builder of the Temple and the social and erotic drama Erotikon directed by Gustav Machatý. The early Czech sound film era was productive, above all in mainstream genres, with the comedies of Martin Frič or Karel Lamač. There were dramatic movies sought internationally.

Hermína Týrlová was a prominent Czech animator, screenwriter, and film director. She was often called the mother of Czech animation. Over the course of her career, she produced over 60 animated children's short films using puppets and the technique of stop motion animation.

Before the German occupation, in 1933, filmmaker and animator Irena Dodalová established the first Czech animation studio "IRE Film" with her husband Karel Dodal.

After the period of Nazi occupation and early communist official dramaturgy of socialist realism in movies at the turn of the 1940s and 1950s with fewer exceptions such as Krakatit or Men without wings (awarded by Palme d'Or in 1946), an era of the Czech film began with animated films, performed in anglophone countries under the name "The Fabulous World of Jules Verne" from 1958, which combined acted drama with animation, and Jiří Trnka, the founder of the modern puppet film. This began a tradition of animated films (Mole etc.).

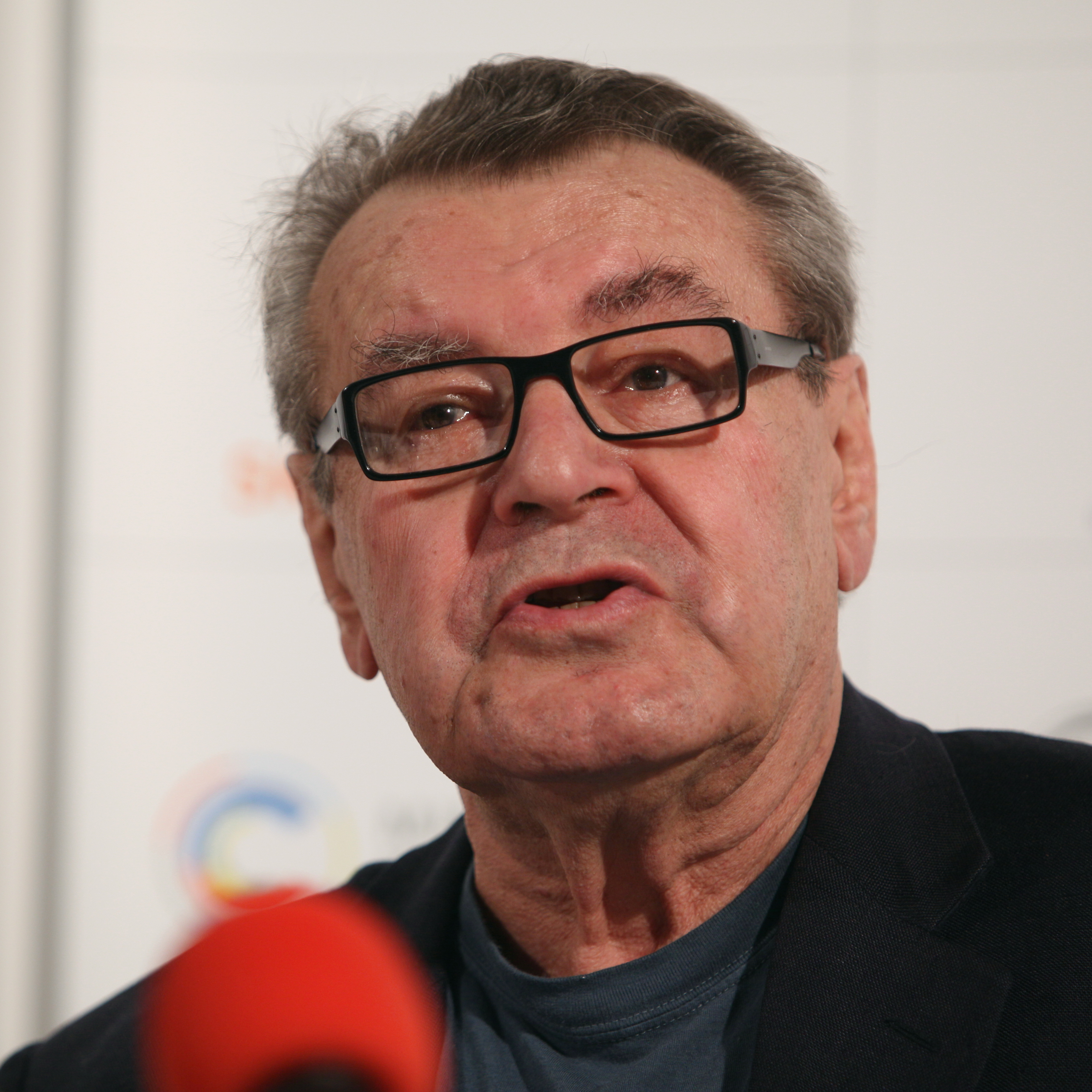
Oscar-winning director Miloš Forman

In the 1960s, the hallmark of Czechoslovak New Wave's films were improvised dialogues, black and absurd humor and the occupation of non-actors. Directors are trying to preserve natural atmosphere without refinement and artificial arrangement of scenes. A personality of the 1960s and the beginning of the 1970s with original manuscript and psychological impact is František Vláčil. Another international author is Jan Švankmajer, a filmmaker and artist whose work spans several media. He is a self-labeled surrealist known for animations and features.

The Barrandov Studios in Prague are the largest film studios with film locations in the country. Filmmakers have come to Prague to shoot scenery no longer found in Berlin, Paris and Vienna. The city of Karlovy Vary was used as a location for the 2006 James Bond film Casino Royale.

The Czech Lion is the highest Czech award for film achievement. Karlovy Vary International Film Festival is one of the film festivals that have been given competitive status by the FIAPF. Other film festivals held in the country include Febiofest, Jihlava International Documentary Film Festival, One World Film Festival, Zlín Film Festival and Fresh Film Festival.

=== Media ===
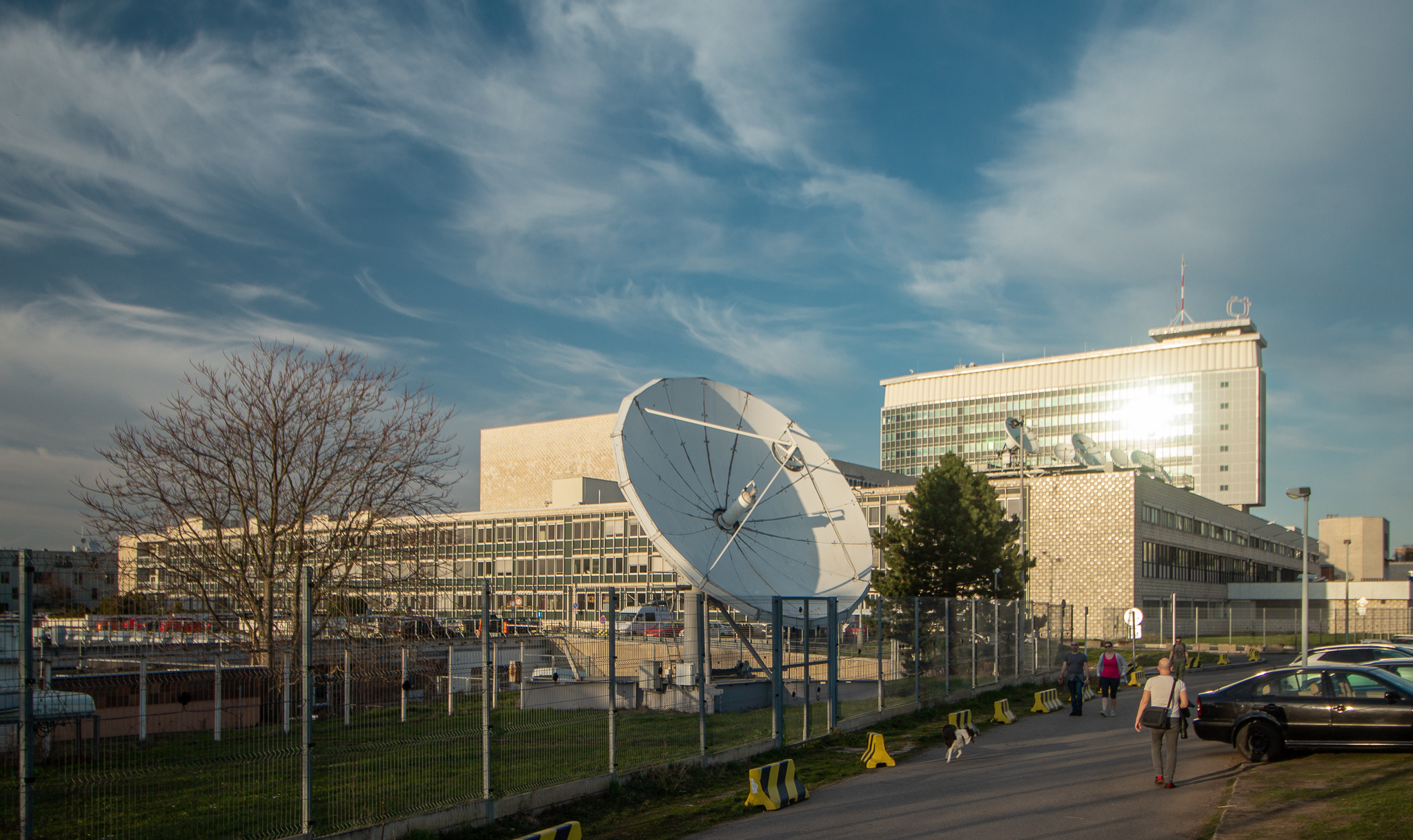
Headquarters of Czech Television

Czech journalists and media enjoy a degree of freedom. There are restrictions against writing in support of Nazism, racism or violating Czech law. The Czech press was ranked as the 40th most free press in the World Press Freedom Index by Reporters Without Borders in 2021. Radio Free Europe/Radio Liberty has its headquarters in Prague.

Czech Television is the country's national public television broadcaster. It operates a number of channels, including ČT1, ČT2, and the 24-hour news channel ČT24, as well as the news website ct24.cz. As of 2020, it is the most watched broadcaster, followed by the private TV Nova and Prima TV. However, TV Nova features the most watched main news program and prime time program. Other public media services include the Czech Radio and the Czech News Agency.

The best-selling daily national newspapers in 2020/21 are Blesk (average 703,000 daily readers), Mladá fronta DNES (average 461,000 daily readers), Právo (average 182,000 daily readers), Lidové noviny (average 163,000 daily readers) and Hospodářské noviny (average 162,000 daily readers).

Most Czechs (87%) read their news online, with Seznam.cz, iDNES.cz, Novinky.cz, iPrima.cz and Seznam Zprávy.cz being the most visited as of 2021.

=== Cuisine ===
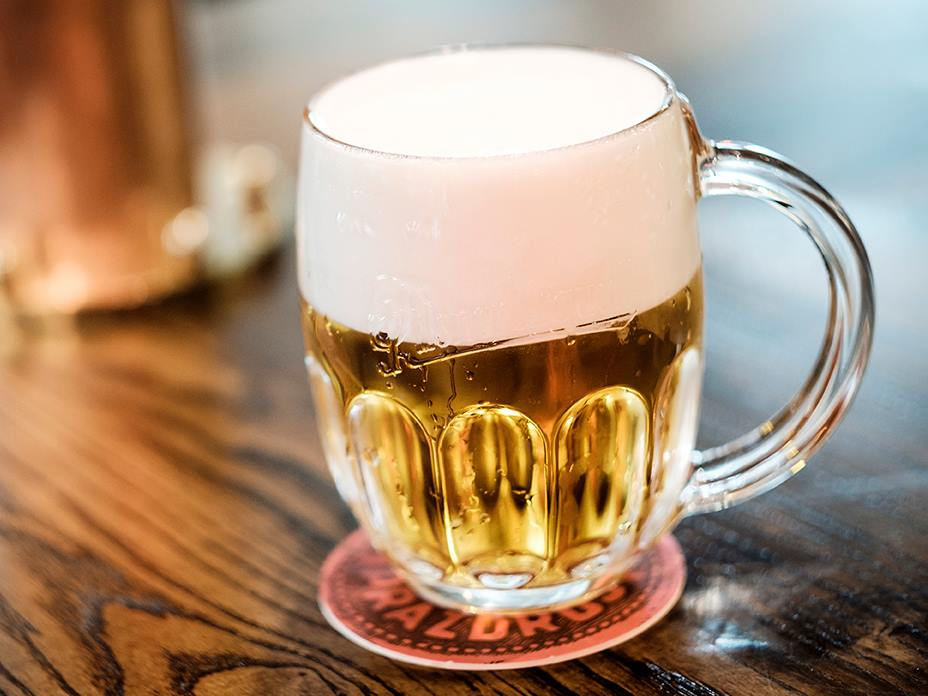
A mug of Pilsner Urquell, the first pilsner type of pale lager beer, brewed since 1842

Czech cuisine is marked by an emphasis on meat dishes with pork, beef, and chicken. Goose, duck, rabbit, and venison are served. Fish is less common, with the occasional exception of fresh trout and carp, which is served at Christmas. One popular Czech menu item is smažený vepřový řízek (fried breaded pork filet), served with boiled potatoes.

There is a variety of local sausages, wurst, pâtés, and smoked and cured meats. Czech desserts include a variety of whipped cream, chocolate, and fruit pastries and tarts, crêpes, creme desserts and cheese, poppy-seed-filled and other types of traditional cakes such as buchty, koláče and štrúdl.

Czech beer has a history extending more than a millennium; the earliest known brewery existed in 993. Today, the Czech Republic has the highest beer consumption per capita in the world. The pilsner style beer (pils) originated in Plzeň, where the world's first blond lager Pilsner Urquell is still produced. It has served as the inspiration for more than two-thirds of the beer produced in the world today. The city of České Budějovice has similarly lent its name to its beer, known as Budweiser Budvar.

The South Moravian region has been producing wine since the Middle Ages; about 94% of vineyards in the Czech Republic are Moravian. Aside from beer, slivovitz and wine, the Czech Republic also produces two liquors, Fernet Stock and Becherovka. Kofola is a non-alcoholic domestic cola soft drink which competes with Coca-Cola and Pepsi.

=== Sport ===
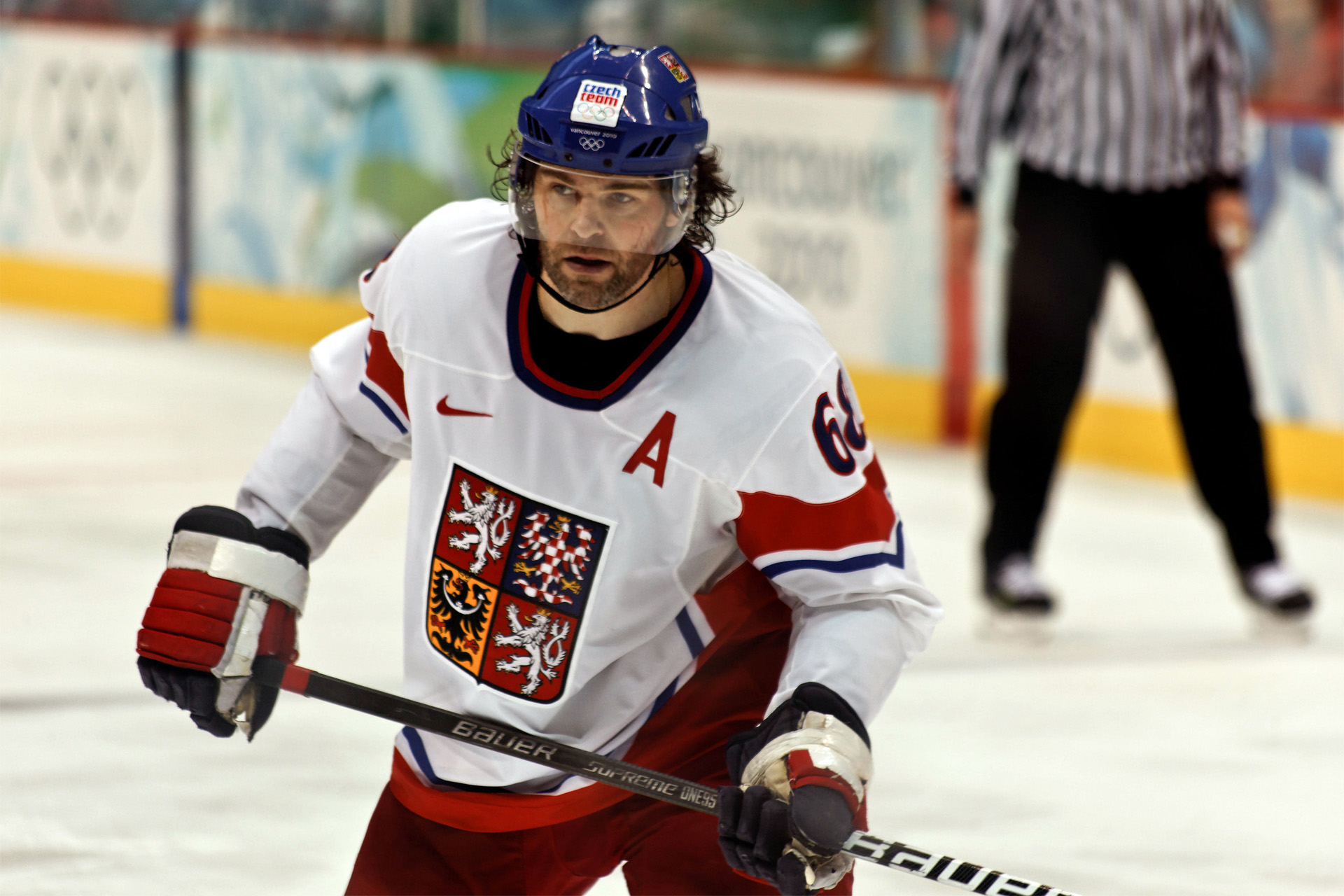
Hockey player Jaromír Jágr has the second-most points in NHL history, after Wayne Gretzky.

The most watched and most attended sport in the Czech Republic are football and ice hockey. The most watched sporting events are the Ice hockey at the Olympic Games and the Ice Hockey World Championships. The most popular sports in the Czech Republic according to the size of the membership base of sports clubs are: football, tennis, ice hockey, volleyball, floorball, golf, ball hockey, athletics, basketball and skiing.

The country has won 15 gold medals in the Summer Olympics and nine in the Winter Games. (See Olympic history.) The Czech ice hockey team won the gold medal at the 1998 Winter Olympics and has won (along with the Czechoslovak team) thirteen gold medals at the World Championships, including three straight from 1999 to 2001.

The Škoda Motorsport is engaged in competition racing since 1901 and has gained a number of titles with various vehicles around the world. MTX automobile company was formerly engaged in the manufacture of racing and formula cars since 1969.

Hiking is a popular sport. The word for 'tourist' in Czech, turista, also means 'trekker' or 'hiker'. For hikers, thanks to the more than 120-year-old tradition, there is the Czech Hiking Markers System of trail blazing, that has been adopted by countries worldwide. There is a network of around 40,000 km of marked short- and long-distance trails crossing the whole country and all the Czech mountains.

== See also ==
- List of Czech Republic-related topics
- Outline of the Czech Republic
