= Vinohrady Cemetery =

Cemetery in the Czech Republic

- Vinohradský hřbitov
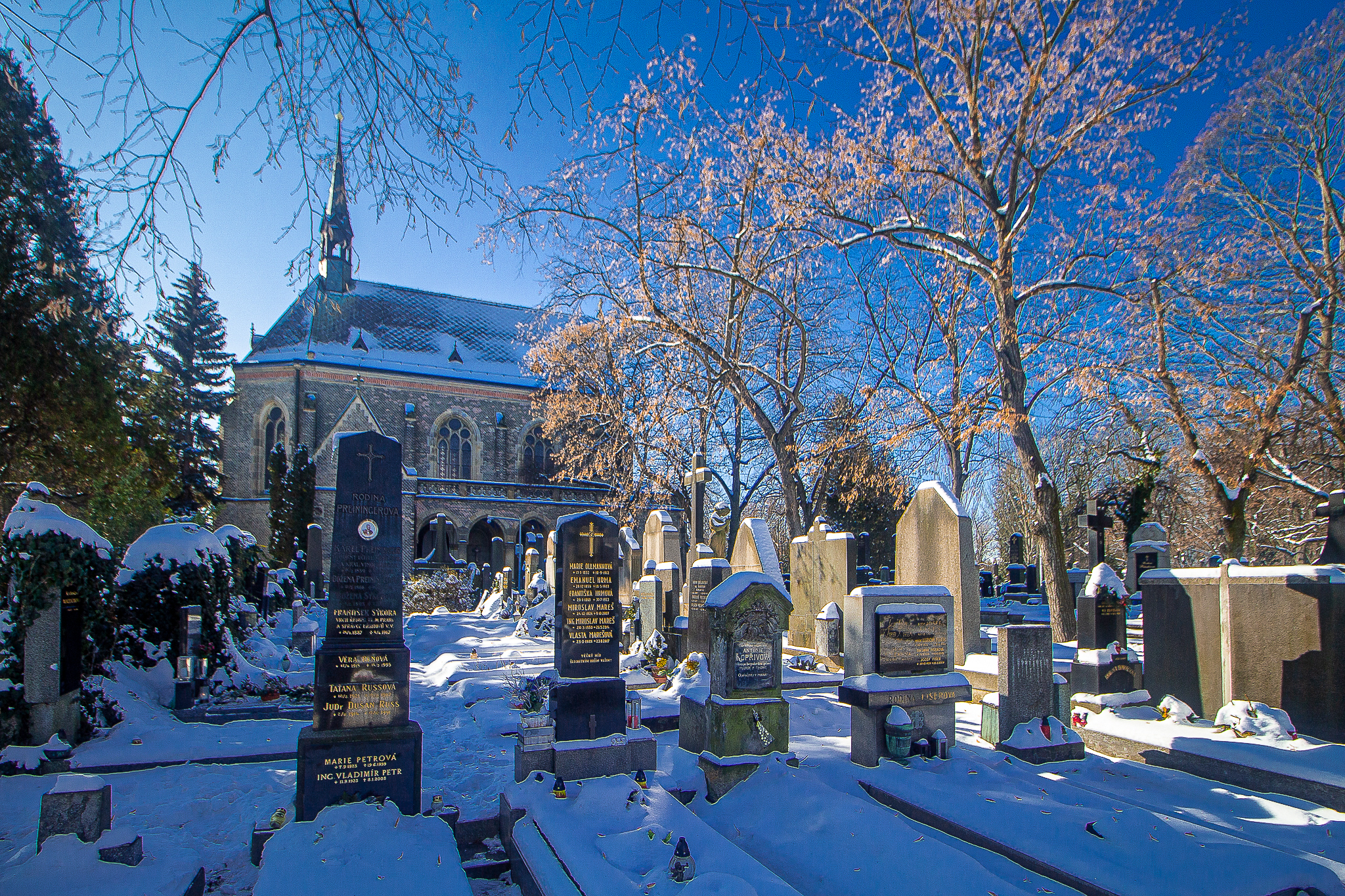
- Chapel of Saint Wenceslaus
- Interactive map of Vinohrady Cemetery

Details
- Established: 1885
- Location: Prague
- Country: Czech Republic
- Coordinates: 50°4′35″N 14°28′52″E
- Type: Public
- Size: 9.5 hectares (23 acres)
- No. of graves: 16,000

Vinohrady Cemetery (Czech: Vinohradský hřbitov) is a cemetery in Prague, Czech Republic. It was founded in 1885 as a cemetery of the city of Královské Vinohrady, which became a part of Prague in 1922 and today is known as the Vinohrady district. It contains the Strašnice Crematorium. Among the most notable people buried at the cemetery are two of the presidents of Czechoslovakia and the Czech Republic, Václav Havel and Emil Hácha.

== History ==
The cemetery was established in 1884–1885, although it was at first smaller than its current size of 9.5 hectares (23 acres). Over time, the land has been extended three times. It is the third largest cemetery of Prague by number of persons buried there, after Olšany Cemetery and Ďáblice Cemetery.

In 1897 the municipal architect Antonín Turek designed the simple chapel here which is near the entrance. This chapel is dedicated to St. Wenceslas and should not be confused with the more modern St. Wenceslas Church in nearby Vršovice. In front of this chapel are the graves of those who were killed in the Prague Uprising of May 1945 as well as a memorial to the children killed during the German occupation of Prague during the Second World War.

The Strašnice Crematorium opened in 1932.

Since 1958, the cemetery and the crematorium has been protected as a cultural monument.

== Notable interments ==
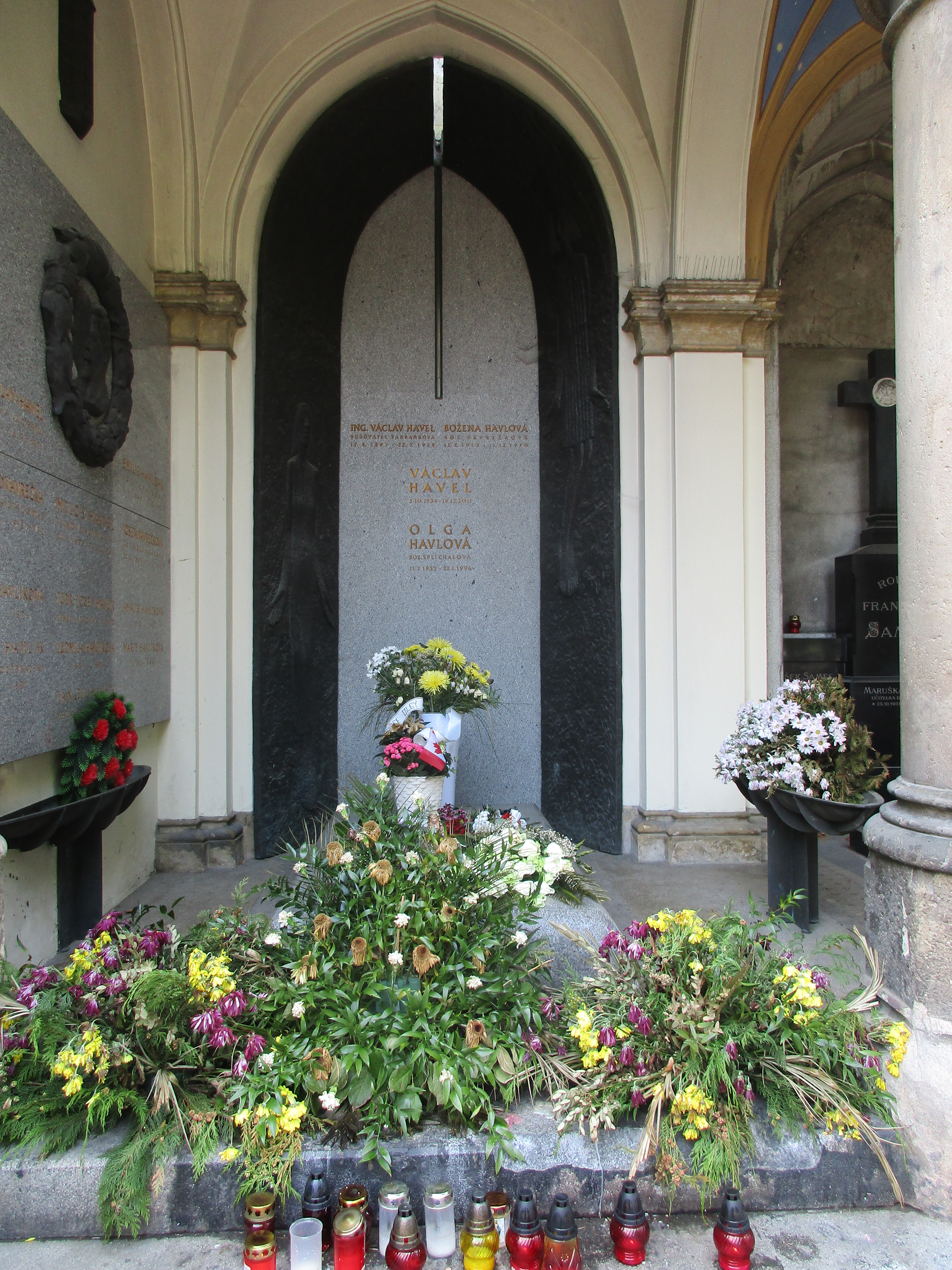
Tomb of Václav Havel and Olga Havlová

Notable people buried at Vinohrady Cemetery include:

=== Politics ===
- Ivan Dejmal (1946–2008), politician and environmentalist
- Emil Hácha (1872–1945), lawyer and president of Czechoslovakia
- Marie Háchová (1873–1938), first lady of Czechoslovakia
- Václav Havel (1936–2011), writer, playwright, president of Czechoslovakia and the Czech Republic
- Olga Havlová (1933–1996), dissident and activist, first lady of Czechoslovakia and the Czech Republic
- Václav Klofáč (1868–1942), politician
- Alfréd Meissner (1871–1950), politician
- Petruška Šustrová (1947–2023), activist, journalist and translator
- Petr Uhl (1941–2021), politician, activist and journalist
- Fráňa Zemínová (1882–1962), politician and women's rights activist

=== Science and academia ===
- Edvín Bayer (1862–1927), botanist
- František Běhounek (1898–1973), physicist, explorer and writer
- František Bubák (1866–1925), mycologist and phytopathologist
- Víťazoslav Cintula (1848–1911), Slovak cartographer and encyclopedist
- Václav Dobruský (1858–1916), archaeologist, epigrapher and numismatist
- Zdeněk Frolík (1933–1989), mathematician
- Jan Gebauer (1838–1907), linguist
- Antonín Heveroch (1869–1927), psychiatrist and neurologist
- Anna Honzáková (1875–1940), physician
- Jaroslav Jahn (1865–1934), paleontologist and mineralogist
- Miroslav Kárný (1919–2001), historian
- Karel Petr (1868–1950), mathematician
- Jiří Polívka (1858–1933), linguist and slavist
- Vladimír Vondráček (1895–1978), psychiatrist
- Jan Nepomuk Woldřich (1834–1906), geologist and paleontologist

=== Arts ===
- Zdeňka Baldová (1885–1958), actress
- Karel Barvitius (1864–1937), publisher and composer
- Vladimír Jindřich Bufka (1887–1916), photographer
- Karel Matěj Čapek-Chod (1860–1927), writer and journalist
- Karel Čech (1844–1913), opera singer
- Ladislav Černý (1891–1975), violist
- Stanislav Feikl (1883–1933), painter
- Jaroslav Foglar (1907–1999), writer
- Hanuš Folkmann (1876–1936), sculptor
- Julius Fučík (1872–1916), composer and conductor
- Jiří Grossmann (1941–1971), actor, poet and composer
- Otto Gutfreund (1889–1927), sculptor
- Gustav Hilmar (1891–1967), actor
- Josef Hiršal (1920–2003), writer and poet
- Josef Holeček (1853–1929), writer
- Růžena Jesenská (1863–1940), writer
- Václav Jírů (1910–1980), photographer
- Viktor Kalabis (1923–2006), composer
- Bohdan Kaminský (1859–1929), poet and translator
- Jan Karafiát (1846–1929), writer
- Egon Kisch (1885–1948), writer and journalist
- Eva Klepáčová (1933–2012), actress
- Jiří Kolář (1914–2002), poet, writer and painter
- Jan Kotěra (1871–1923), architect and designer
- Jan Křesadlo (1926–1995), writer and psychologist
- Ivan Kyncl (1953–2004), photographer
- Oldřich Lajsek (1925–2001), painter
- Karel Lidický (1900–1976), sculptor
- Emil Artur Longen (1885–1936), playwright, actor and painter
- Josef Mathauser (1846–1917), painter
- Vlasta Matulová (1918–1989), actress
- Stanislav Neumann (1902–1975), actor
- Petr Novák (1945–1997), singer and songwriter
- Theodor Pištěk (1895–1960), actor and film director
- Jan Pivec (1907–1980), actor
- Emil Pollert (1877–1935), opera singer
- Viktor Ponrepo (1858–1926), magician and film director
- Antonín Popp (1850–1915), sculptor
- Simona Postlerová (1964–2024), actress
- Karel Václav Rais (1859–1926), writer and poet
- Ludvík Ráža (1929–2000), film director
- Karel Reiner (1910–1979), composer and pianist
- Viktor Růžička (1943–2014), cinematographer
- Zuzana Růžičková (1927–2017), harpsichordist
- Jan Rychlík (1916–1964), composer
- František Salzer (1902–1974), theatre director and actor
- Jakub Schikaneder (1855–1924), painter
- Karel Šebor (1843–1903), composer and conductor
- Klement Slavický (1910–1999), composer
- Čeněk Šlégl (1899–1970), actor
- Růžena Šlemrová (1886–1962), actress
- Jiří Šlitr (1924–1969), songwriter, pianist and singer
- Karel Špillar (1871–1939), painter and graphic artist
- Rudolf Vojtěch Špillar (1878–1949), painter and photographer
- Viktor Stretti (1878–1957), etcher and lithographer
- Dalibor C. Vačkář (1906–1984), composer
- Václav Vačkář (1881–1954), composer and conductor
- Gabriela Vránová (1939–2018), actress
- Zikmund Winter (1846–1912), writer and historian
- Karel Zich (1949–2004), singer and guitarist
- Otakar Zich (1879–1934), composer

=== Sports ===
- Eva Bosáková (1931–1991), gymnast
- Josef Čada (1881–1959), gymnast
- Věra Drazdíková (1933–1983), gymnast
- Aleš Höffer (1962–2008), athlete
- Karel Hromádka (1887–1956), chess player
- Eliška Junková (1900–1994), car racer
- Jan Košek (1884–1927), footballer
- Jan Říha (1915–1995), footballer

=== Other ===
- Miloš Havel (1899–1968), film producer
- Emil Kolben (1862–1943), engineer and entrepreneur
- Eleonora Šomková (1817–1891), fiancée of Karel Hynek Mácha
