= List of Czech inventions and discoveries =

The following is a list and timeline of innovations as well as inventions and discoveries that involved Czech people or the Czech Republic including predecessor states in the history of the formation of the Czech Republic. This list covers innovation and invention in the mechanical, electronic, and industrial fields, as well as medicine, military devices and theory, artistic and scientific discovery and innovation, and ideas in religion and ethics.

== 18th century ==
- Denis d'or, reportedly the first musical instrument in history that involved electricity, was invented by Prokop Diviš in 1748.
- Prokop Diviš invented a "meteorological machine" erected in Přímětice (now part of Znojmo) in June 1754. It is sometimes counted as an invention of the lightning rod.

== 19th century ==
- Purkinje effect, the colour shift between two eye systems differentiated by light intensity was discovered by Jan Evangelista Purkyně in 1819.
- Josef Ressel invented one of the first working ship's propellers. He worked in Landstrass (Kostanjevica on the Krka river in Carniola), where he tested his ship propellers for the first time. In 1821 he was transferred to Trieste, the biggest port of the Austrian Empire, where his tests were successful. He was awarded a propeller patent in 1827.
- Ruchadlo, a modern turn-plough, was invented in 1827 by Veverka cousins, which not only broke up soil, but also turned and crumbled it. It was the first plough on wheels, which made it easier to manage.
- Purkinje fibers are organs in the human heart discovered by Jan Evangelista Purkyně in 1839.
- Sugar cubes were invented by Jakob Christof Rad in Dačice in 1843.
- Photogravure was invented by Karel Klíč in 1878.
- František Křižík invented in 1878 a remotely operated signaling device to protect against collision between trains.
- František Křižík invented in 1880 the automatic electric arc lamp, the so-called "Plzen Lamp" which was displayed at the International Exposition of Electricity in Paris in 1881
- František Křižík built one of first electromobiles in Austria-Hungary in 1895.

== 20th century ==
- The first electrified railway in Austria-Hungary was built by František Křižík from Tábor to Bechyně in 1903.
- Fanta bowl is a specialised pharmaceutical mortar and pestle made from Melamine resin in order to avoid contamination of medicines. It was invented by Max Fanta in 1904.
- Color photography was invented by Karl Schinzel in Opava-Komárov in 1905.
- Four blood types were recognised and designated by Jan Janský in Prague in 1907. It is considered the most important Czech medical discovery.
- Kaplan turbine was invented by Viktor Kaplan who obtained his first patent for an adjustable blade propeller turbine in 1912.
- Tent with wooden sides was invented by the Czech Scout Association in 1913.
- String bag was invented by Vavřín Krčil in Žďár nad Sázavou in the 1920s.
- The word robot was first used to denote a fictional humanoid in a 1920 Czech-language play R.U.R. by Karel Čapek, though it was Karel's brother Josef Čapek who was the word's true inventor.
- Polarography was invented by Jaroslav Heyrovský in 1922.
- Cabin motorcycle (Dálník) was invented by Jan Anderle during 1930s.
- Versatile pencil was invented by Czech company Koh-i-Noor Hardtmuth in 1937.
- Silon textile material (synthetic fiber) was invented by Otto Wichterle during the 1940s.
- Water jet loom is a shuttleless loom, which allowed much faster operation. It was invented and patented by Vladimír Svatý in 1950. The first machine was made in Zlín, and has been mass-produced in Semily since 1955.
- Soft contact lenses – Drahoslav Lim and Otto Wichterle invented Polyhydroxyethylmethacrylate (pHEMA) for biological use. Wichterle thought pHEMA might be a suitable material for a contact lens and gained his first patent for soft contact lenses. By late 1961, he succeeded in producing the first four pHEMA hydrogel contact lenses on a home-made apparatus.
- Sobering-up station was invented by Jaroslav Skála in 1951.
- Remoska is a small portable electric oven with the cooking element housed in the lid of a pot that consists of a Teflon-lined pan and a stand in addition to the lid mounted heating element. It was developed by the Czech electrical engineer Oldřich Homuta in the 1950s.
- Czechoslovak pharmacologist Frank Berger invented Meprobamate, the first tranquilliser and Felbamate, an anticonvulsant used in the treatment of epilepsy.
- Semtex, a general purpose plastic explosive, was invented in the late 1950s by Stanislav Brebera and Radim Fukátko, chemists at VCHZ Synthesia.
- Kurt Lehovec invented p–n junction isolation – a method used to electrically isolate electronic components, such as transistors, on an integrated circuit (IC) by surrounding the components with reverse biased p–n junctions.
- Shock-absorbent barrel used for stunts was developed by Karel Soucek.
- Tenofovir disoproxil was synthesized by Antonín Holý at the Institute of Organic Chemistry and Biochemistry of the Czechoslovak Academy of Sciences in Prague. The patent filed in 1986 makes no mention of the potential use of the compound for the treatment of HIV infection but claims activity against herpes simplex virus.

== 21st century ==
- W0 constant was invented by Czech scientist Viliam Vatrt in 2011.
- Solar Air Water Earth Resource (S.A.W.E.R.) is an autonomous system for obtaining water by condensation from the air. The project was developed by researchers of the Czech Technical University in Prague and the Czech Academy of Sciences.
