= Booze bus =

Booze bus may refer to:

- A sobriety checkpoint in Australia and New Zealand
- A mobile drunk tank in the UK. Buses such as these are very commonly found throughout Australia and New Zealand.
