= Chvatěruby =

- Municipality
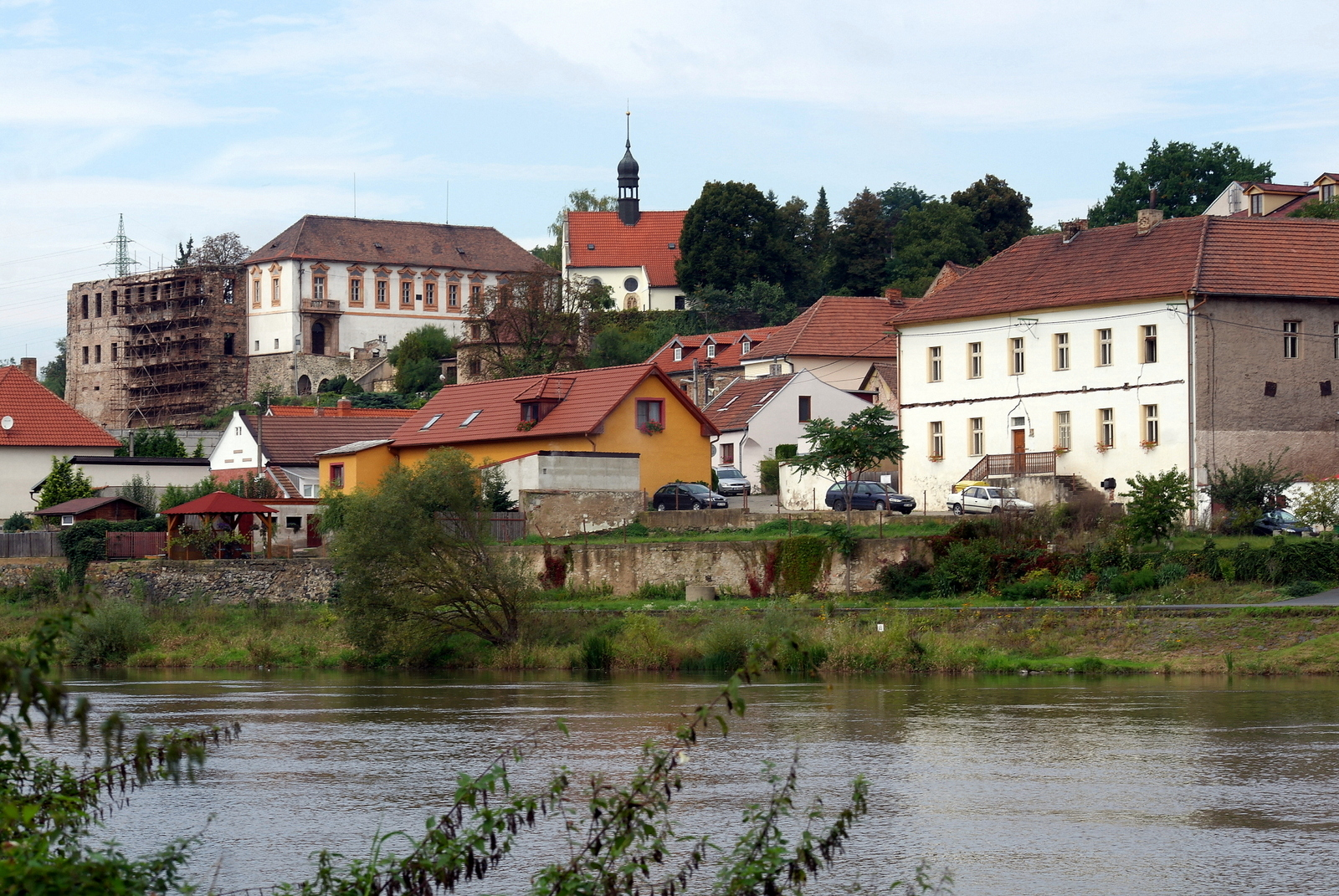
- View towards Chvatěruby across the Vltava

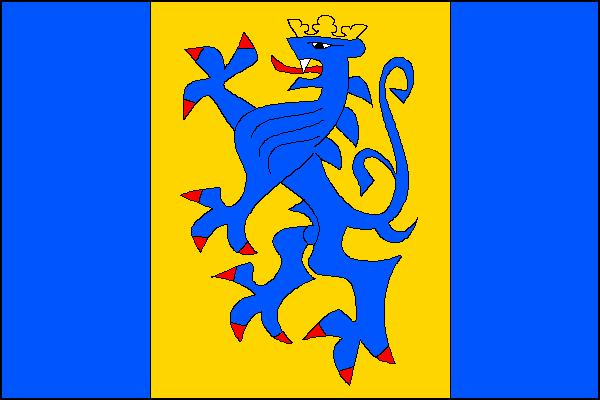
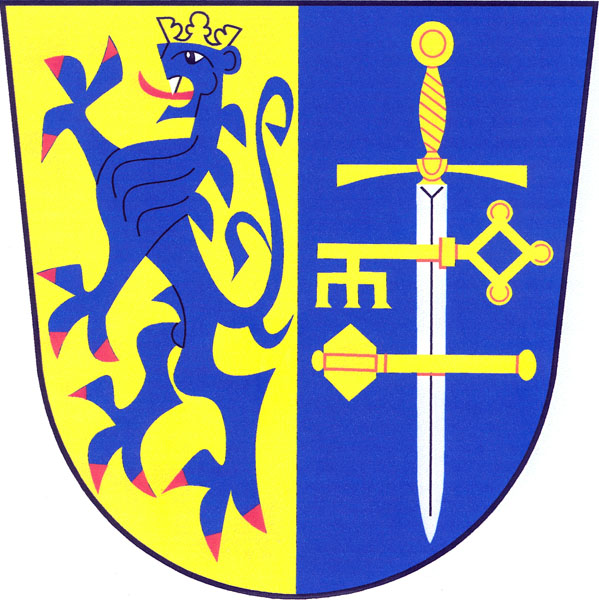
- Flag Coat of arms

- Location in the Czech Republic
- Coordinates: 50°13′58″N 14°20′34″E
- Country: Czech Republic
- Region: Central Bohemian
- District: Mělník
- First mentioned: 1141

Area
  - Total: 3.31 km^{2} (1.28 sq mi)
- Elevation: 187 m (614 ft)

Population (2026-01-01)
  - Total: 608
  - Density: 184/km^{2} (476/sq mi)
- Time zone: UTC+1 (CET)
  - Summer (DST): UTC+2 (CEST)
- Postal code: 278 01
- Website: www.chvateruby.cz

Chvatěruby is a municipality and village in Mělník District in the Central Bohemian Region of the Czech Republic. It has about 600 inhabitants.

== Etymology ==
The name is derived from the word chvatirub. It was a nickname for local people, derived from the Old Czech words chvátiti ('to grasp', 'to seize') and rub ('clothes').

== Geography ==
Chvatěruby is located about 14 kilometres (9 mi) north of Prague. It lies on the border between the Central Elbe Table and Prague Plateau. The municipality is situated on the right bank of the Vltava River.

== History ==
The first written mention of Chvatěruby is from 1141, when the village was donated to the monastery in Doksany.

== Demographics ==
Historical population

Year	Pop.	±%
1869	455	—
1880	500	+9.9%
1890	489	−2.2%
1900	501	+2.5%
1910	515	+2.8%

Year	Pop.	±%
1921	485	−5.8%
1930	556	+14.6%
1950	521	−6.3%
1961	497	−4.6%
1970	535	+7.6%

Year	Pop.	±%
1980	418	−21.9%
1991	332	−20.6%
2001	425	+28.0%
2011	515	+21.2%
2021	539	+4.7%

Source: Censuses

== Transport ==
The train station Chvatěruby on the railway line Kralupy nad Vltavou–Neratovice, which serves the municipality, is located just outside the municipal territory.

== Sights ==
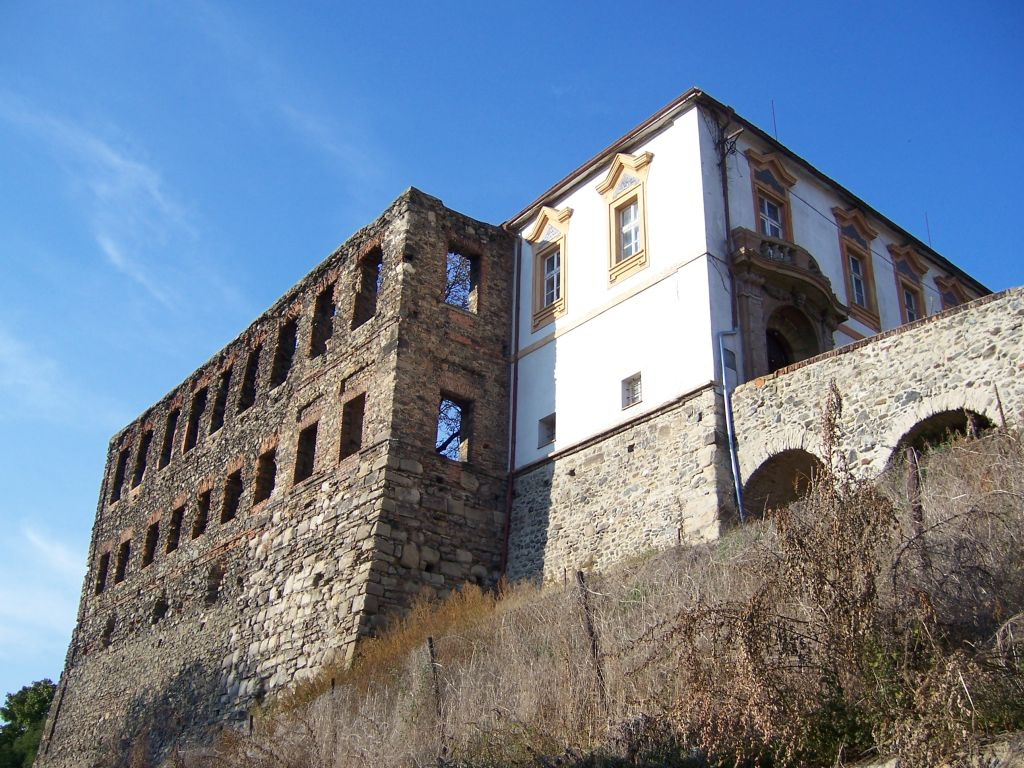
Chvatěruby Castle

Among the two main landmarks of Chvatěruby is the church and the castle. The Church of Saints Peter and Paul was originally a Gothic building, completely rebuilt in the Renaissance style in 1656.

The Chvatěruby Castle dates from the 14th century. During the rule of the Lobkowicz family, it was rebuilt in the Renaissance style. The castle was then rebuilt at the beginning of the 18th century, when two old wings were demolished and a new Baroque wing was added. However, this new wing repeatedly lost its roof, and because there was no money for repairs, it became a ruin. Today, the castle is in private ownership.

Other protected cultural monuments include a sandstone statue of Saint John of Nepomuk from the mid-18th century and a cast iron cemetery cross, created in the 1860s.
