= Mistr Kampanus =

1906 historical novel by Zikmund Winter

Mistr Kampanus is a Czech historical novel, written by Zikmund Winter. First published in 1906, the time depicted is the 17th century during the Thirty Years' War.
