= Zikmund Winter =

Czech writer and historian

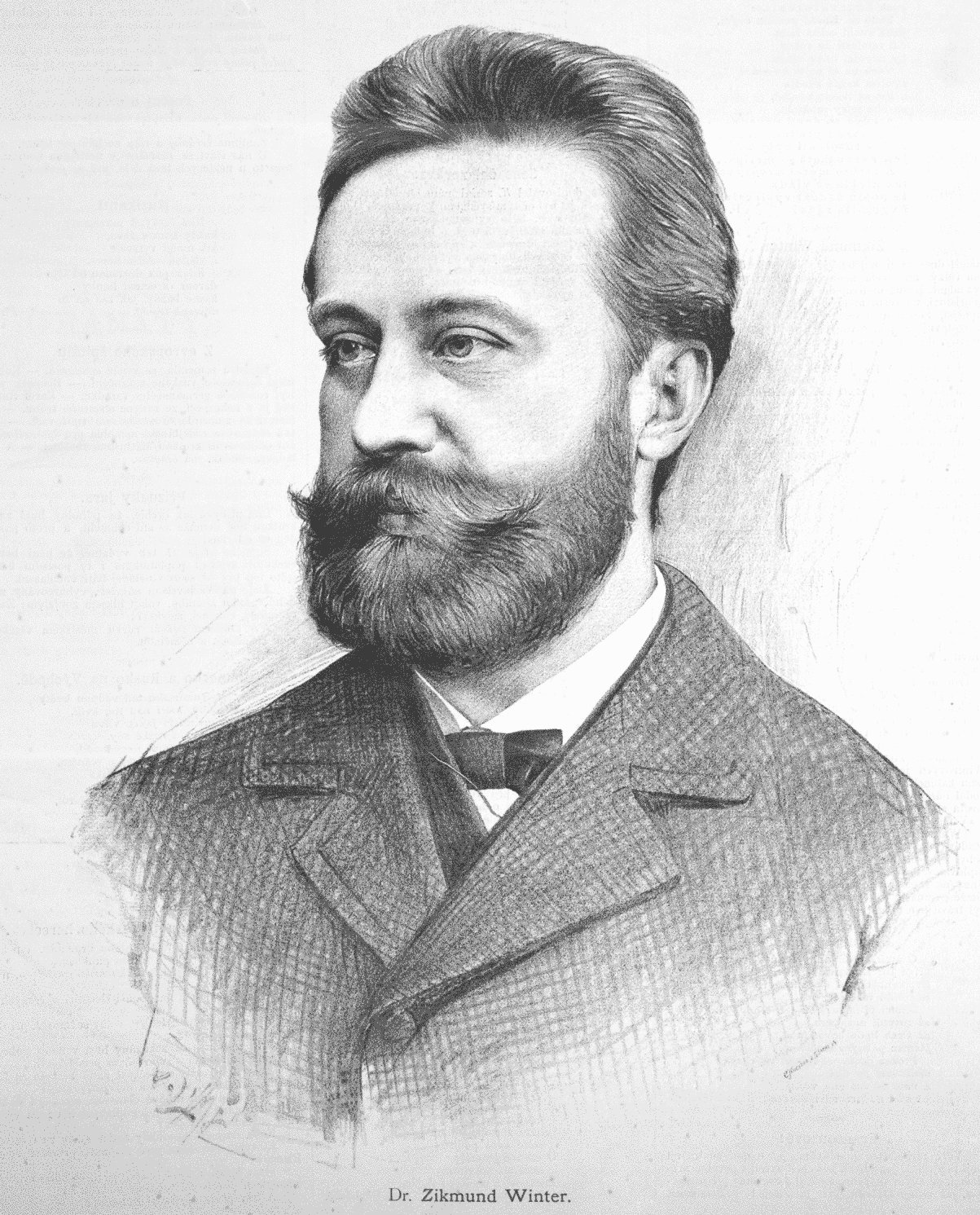
- Portrait of Winter by Jan Vilímek
- Born: 27 December 1846; Prague, Bohemia, Austrian Empire
- Died: 12 June 1912 (aged 65); Bad Reichenhall, German Empire
- Occupations: Writer, historian

Zikmund Winter (27 December 1846 – 12 June 1912) was a Czech writer and historian. The author of many historical novels and essays, he maintained an interest in Bohemian life from the 15th to 17th centuries. He died in 1912 and he was buried at Vinohrady Cemetery.

== Selected works ==
- Mistr Kampanus

== Sources ==
- South Bohemia and Bohemian Forest
