= Zdíkov =

- Municipality
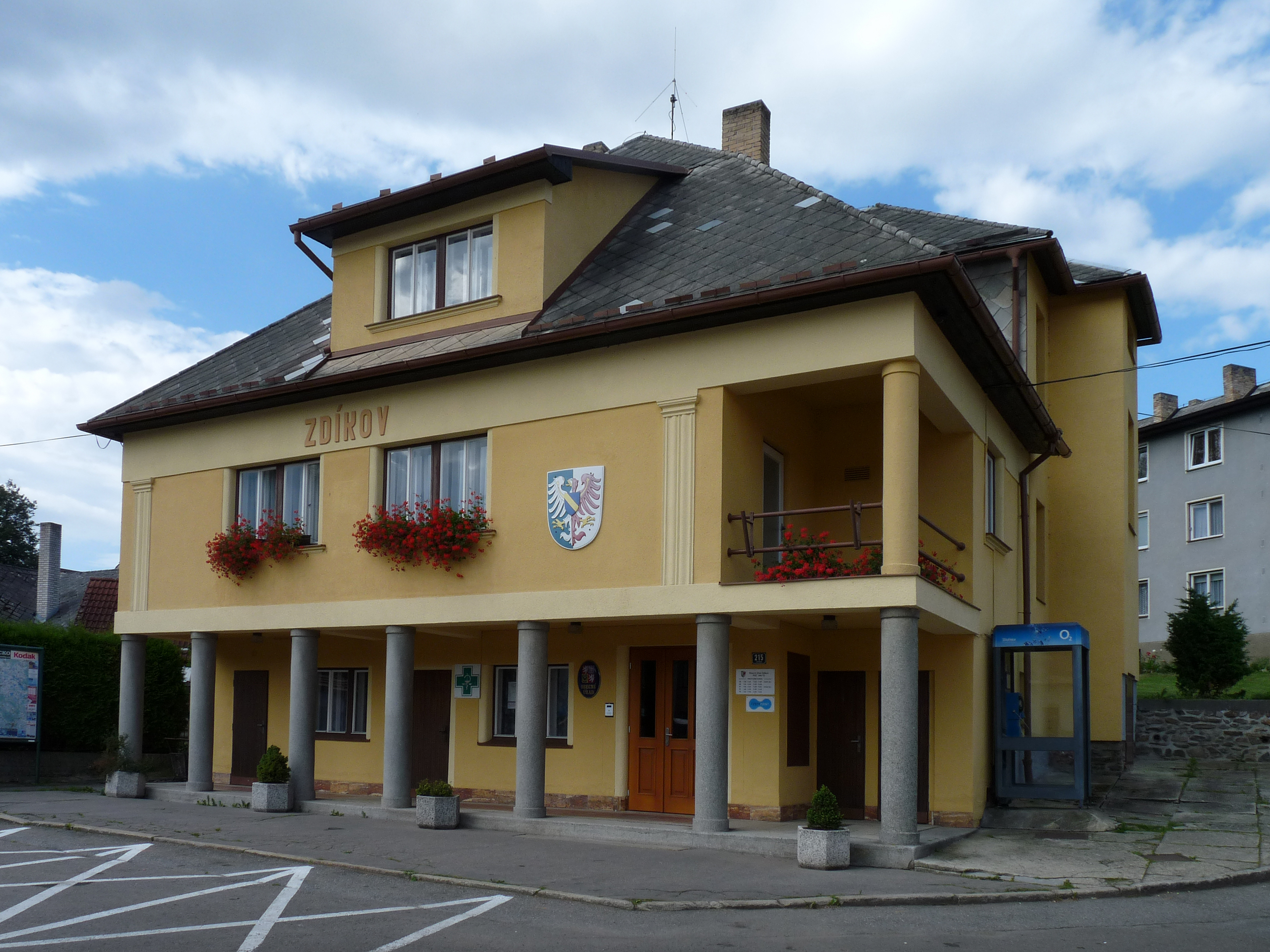
- Municipal office

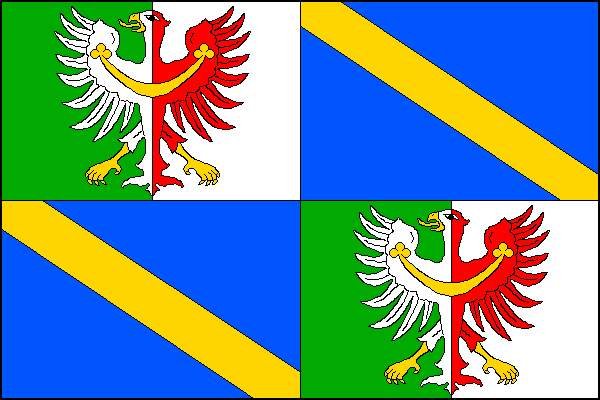
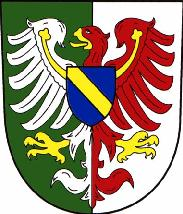
- Flag Coat of arms

- Location in the Czech Republic
- Coordinates: 49°5′5″N 14°41′51″E
- Country: Czech Republic
- Region: South Bohemian
- District: Prachatice
- First mentioned: 1318

Area
  - Total: 31.91 km^{2} (12.32 sq mi)
- Elevation: 732 m (2,402 ft)

Population (2026-01-01)
  - Total: 1,697
  - Density: 53.18/km^{2} (137.7/sq mi)
- Time zone: UTC+1 (CET)
  - Summer (DST): UTC+2 (CEST)
- Postal codes: 384 72, 384 73
- Website: www.zdikov.cz

Zdíkov is a municipality and village in Prachatice District in the South Bohemian Region of the Czech Republic. It has about 1,700 inhabitants.

Zdíkov lies approximately 24 kilometres (15 mi) west of Prachatice, 59 km (37 mi) west of České Budějovice, and 124 km (77 mi) south-west of Prague.

== Administrative division ==
Zdíkov consists of nine municipal parts (in brackets population according to the 2021 census):

- Zdíkov (1,089)
- Branišov (61)
- Hodonín (39)
- Masákova Lhota (107)
- Nový Dvůr (79)
- Putkov (52)
- Račov (57)
- Zdíkovec (128)
- Žírec (22)

== Demographics ==
Historical population
Year	Pop.	±%
1869	3,335	—
1880	3,696	+10.8%
1890	3,826	+3.5%
1900	4,080	+6.6%
1910	4,381	+7.4%
1921	3,958	−9.7%
1930	3,591	−9.3%
1950	2,150	−40.1%
1961	2,206	+2.6%
1970	1,925	−12.7%
1980	1,827	−5.1%
1991	1,630	−10.8%
2001	1,608	−1.3%
2011	1,665	+3.5%
2021	1,634	−1.9%
Source: Censuses

== Notable people ==
- Jan Nepomuk Woldřich (1834–1906), Czech-Austrian geologist and paleontologist
