= Josef Woldřich =

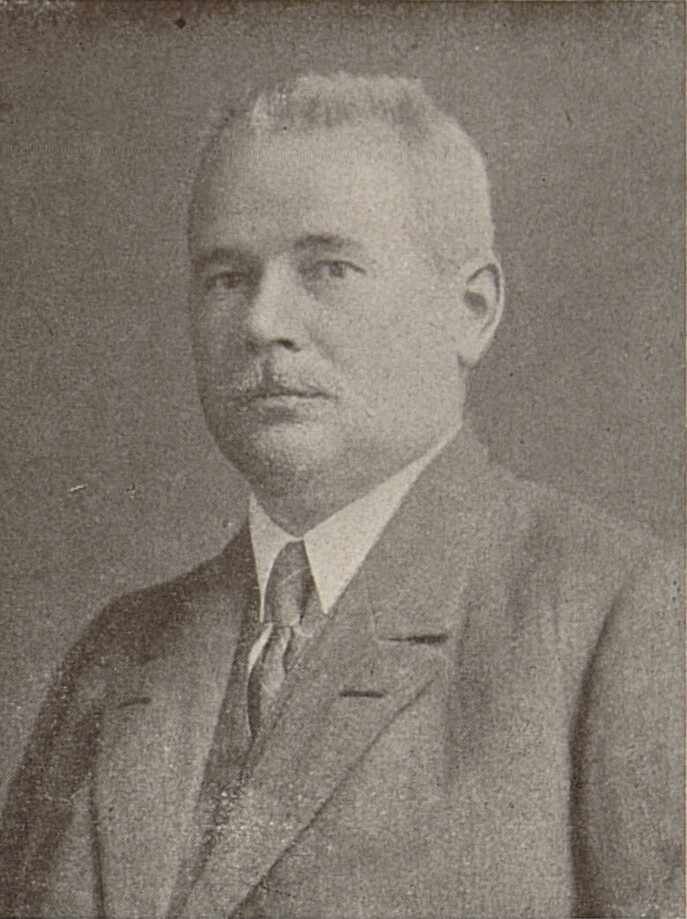

Josef Woldřich (18 February 1880 – 3 August 1937) was a Czech geologist and paleontologist. He was the founder of the Institute of Geology of the Faculty of Science of Masaryk University. He specialized in hydrogeology. He was the son of geologist Jan Nepomuk Woldřich.

Woldřich was born in Vienna, the son of professor of geology Jan Nepomuk Woldřich. He studied in Vienna and Prague before joining to study geology at the Charles University in Prague and received a doctorate in 1902. He worked as an assistant in the department until 1905 and then taught at schools. In 1912 he became an associate professor of geology and in 1915 he moved to Charles-Ferdinand University. He was part of the Czech delegation at the Paris peace conference of 1919. In 1920 he became a full professor at Masaryk University where he established the institute of geological paleontology in Brno. He served as dean of Masaryk University in 1923–24. From 1929 he was at the Czech Technical University in Prague. In 1934 he headed the state geological institute. He advised the government on dams, canals and other constructions.
