= Paceřice =

- Municipality
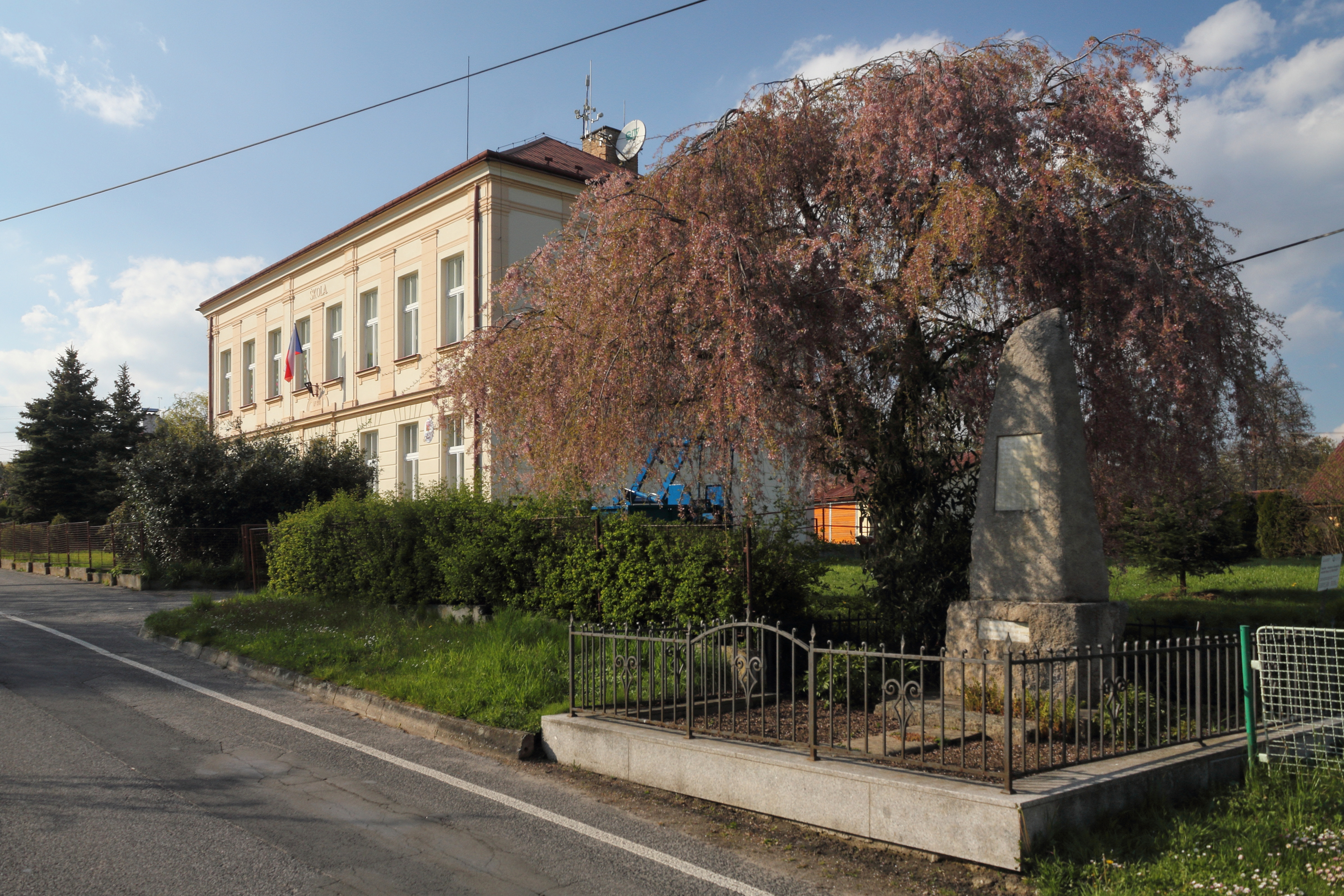
- Municipal office and kindergarten

- Flag Coat of arms

- Location in the Czech Republic
- Coordinates: 50°37′9″N 15°6′49″E
- Country: Czech Republic
- Region: Liberec
- District: Liberec
- First mentioned: 1543

Area
  - Total: 3.50 km^{2} (1.35 sq mi)
- Elevation: 328 m (1,076 ft)

Population (2026-01-01)
  - Total: 401
  - Density: 115/km^{2} (297/sq mi)
- Time zone: UTC+1 (CET)
  - Summer (DST): UTC+2 (CEST)
- Postal code: 463 44
- Website: www.pacerice.cz

Paceřice (German: Patzerschitz) is a municipality and village in Liberec District in the Liberec Region of the Czech Republic. It has about 400 inhabitants.

== Administrative division ==
Paceřice consists of two municipal parts (in brackets population according to the 2021 census):

- Paceřice (241)
- Husa (114)

== History ==
The first written mention of Paceřice is from 1543.

== Demographics ==
Historical population
Year	Pop.	±%
1869	680	—
1880	645	−5.1%
1890	658	+2.0%
1900	657	−0.2%
1910	613	−6.7%
1921	559	−8.8%
1930	547	−2.1%
1950	403	−26.3%
1961	365	−9.4%
1970	324	−11.2%
1980	310	−4.3%
1991	302	−2.6%
2001	274	−9.3%
2011	288	+5.1%
2021	355	+23.3%
Source: Censuses

== Notable people ==
- Bohdan Kaminský (1859–1929), poet and translator
