= Kralupy nad Vltavou =

- Town
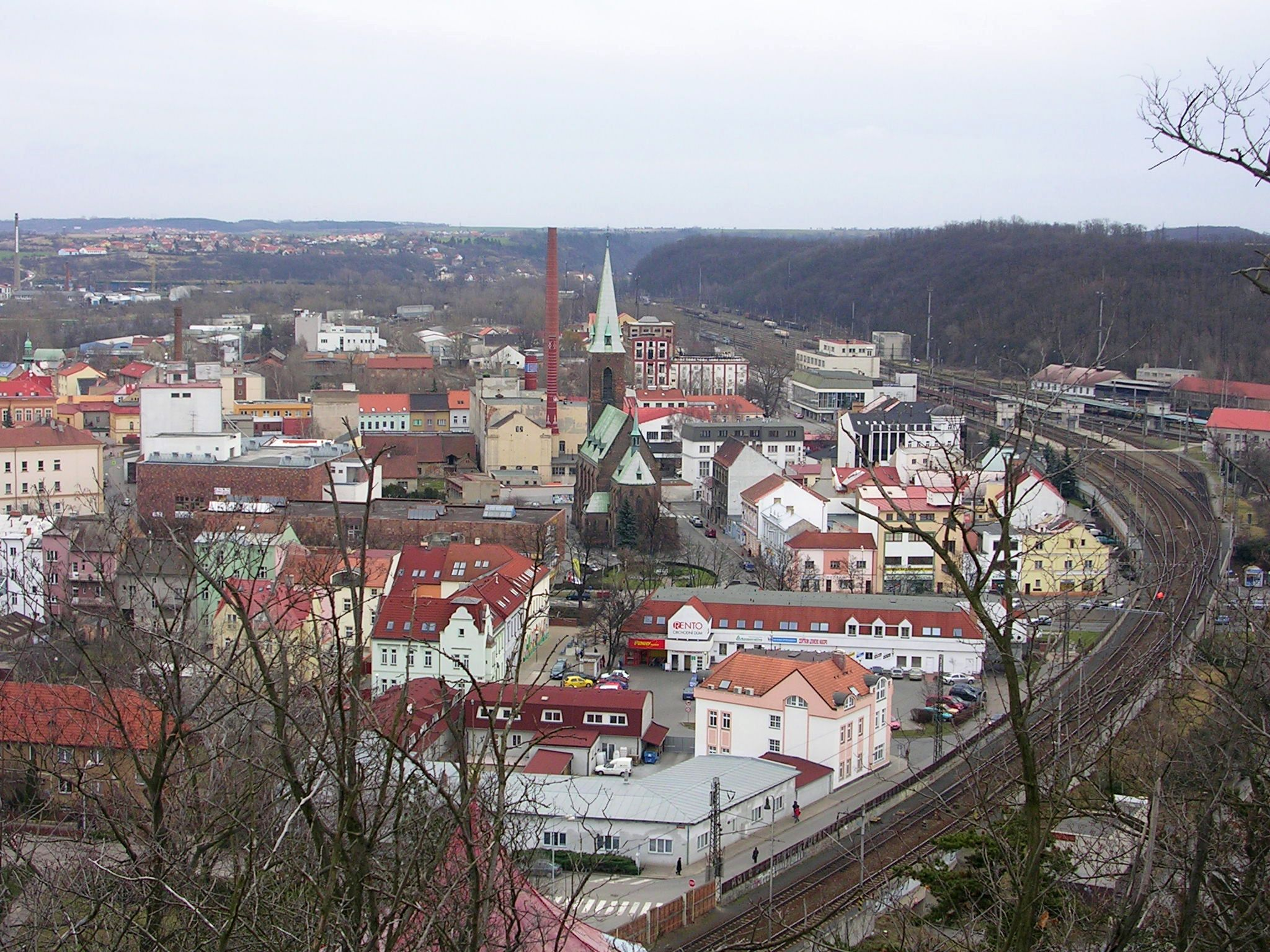
- Kralupy nad Vltavou seen from Hostibejk

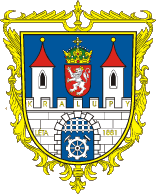
- Flag Coat of arms

- Location in the Czech Republic
- Coordinates: 50°14′27″N 14°18′24″E
- Country: Czech Republic
- Region: Central Bohemian
- District: Mělník
- First mentioned: 1253

Government
  - Mayor: Vojtěch Pohl

Area
  - Total: 21.90 km^{2} (8.46 sq mi)
- Elevation: 176 m (577 ft)

Population (2026-01-01)
  - Total: 19,138
  - Density: 873.9/km^{2} (2,263/sq mi)
- Time zone: UTC+1 (CET)
  - Summer (DST): UTC+2 (CEST)
- Postal code: 278 01
- Website: www.mestokralupy.cz

Kralupy nad Vltavou (Czech pronunciation: [ˈkralupɪ ˈnad vl̩tavou]; German: Kralup an der Moldau) is a town in Mělník District in the Central Bohemian Region of the Czech Republic. It has about 19,000 inhabitants. The town is located on the Vltava River and is known as a traffic hub and industrial agglomeration.

For centuries Kralupy nad Vltavou was an agricultural village, which grew thanks to industrialisation in the 19th century. The main landmark of the town is the Church of the Assumption of the Virgin Mary and Saint Wenceslaus, built in the neo-Gothic style.

== Administrative division ==
Kralupy nad Vltavou consists of five municipal parts (in brackets population according to the 2021 census):

- Kralupy nad Vltavou (8,882)
- Lobeček (5,715)
- Mikovice (2,133)
- Minice (1,043)
- Zeměchy (602)

== Etymology ==
The name Kralupy is derived from the Czech words koru lúpati (meaning 'to peel bark'). Bark was peeled here for the ooze for tanning leather.

== Geography ==
Town panorama

Kralupy nad Vltavou is located about 16 kilometres (10 mi) north of Prague. It lies on the border between three geomorphological regions: Central Elbe Table in the northeast, Lower Ohře Table in the northwest, and Prague Plateau in the south. The highest point is at 284 m (932 ft) above sea level. The Vltava River flows through the town.

== History ==
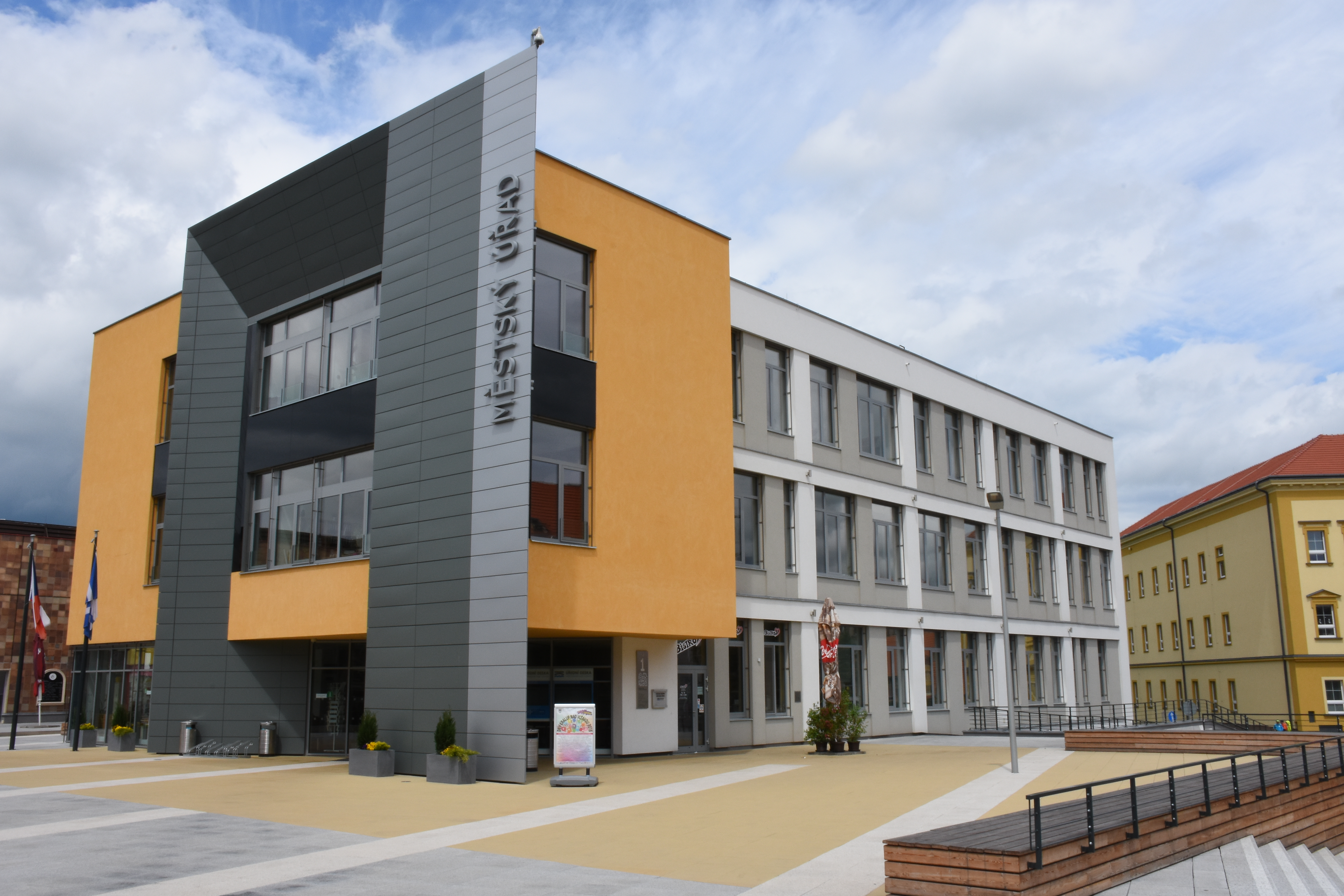
Town hall

The first written reliable mention of Kralupy is from 1253. It was originally a village by the local ford. From its establishment to 1848, it was owned mostly by Knights of the Cross with the Red Star, except for four enforced short breaks. It had belonged to the same authority for six hundred years, which is a rare case.

When the importance of the Kralupy river ford ceased, the inhabitants mostly occupied themselves with farming. Growing and drying fruits had a tradition here. In 1851, the state railway line from Prague to Dresden was put into operation and in 1856, the Buštěhrad line with the reloading dock on the Vltava River opened. This laid the foundations of the Kralupy railway junction, which was extended in 1865 by the construction of the Kralupy–Turnov line. The development of the river shipping had led to the regulation of the Vltava in 1894. The railway and river transportation stimulated a rapid population growth and overall economic development Many enterprises were established and the price of land rose.

In 1854, the shipyard producing both wooden and metal vessels was founded and in 1857 the first real factory opened – a chemical factory called Jordánka, which employed 600 people in its heyday. In 1867, the steam-mill was put into operation, two sugar factories in 1868–1869, and a brewery opened in 1872. At the same time the first sand quarries and brickworks were opened. The general growth occurred, the mineral oil refinery was put into operation. This stage of the transformation of the village into a town culminated in 1881, when Kralupy was promoted to a market town, and in 1902, when it became a town. In 1902, the neighbouring settlement of Lobeč was joined to Kralupy and it changed its name to Kralupy nad Vltavou.

World War I affected the town only indirectly. After the war, several new enterprises were established. The town suffered in World War II, when the oil campaign targeted the oil refinery in 1945. During the totalitarian communist rule in 1948–1989, the town lacked democratic municipal government.

The town's location is the cause of frequent devastating floods, which came in 1784, 1845 and 1890. The town centre was also damaged by the 2002 European floods.

Lobeček, Mikovice and Minice were separate municipalities until 1980, when they were incorporated into the town. Zeměchy was incorporated in 1986.

== Demographics ==
Historical population

Year	Pop.	±%
1869	3,317	—
1880	5,200	+56.8%
1890	5,761	+10.8%
1900	7,743	+34.4%
1910	9,549	+23.3%

Year	Pop.	±%
1921	9,612	+0.7%
1930	10,960	+14.0%
1950	10,558	−3.7%
1961	11,629	+10.1%
1970	14,898	+28.1%

Year	Pop.	±%
1980	17,928	+20.3%
1991	17,934	+0.0%
2001	17,506	−2.4%
2011	18,472	+5.5%
2021	18,375	−0.5%

Source: Censuses

== Economy ==
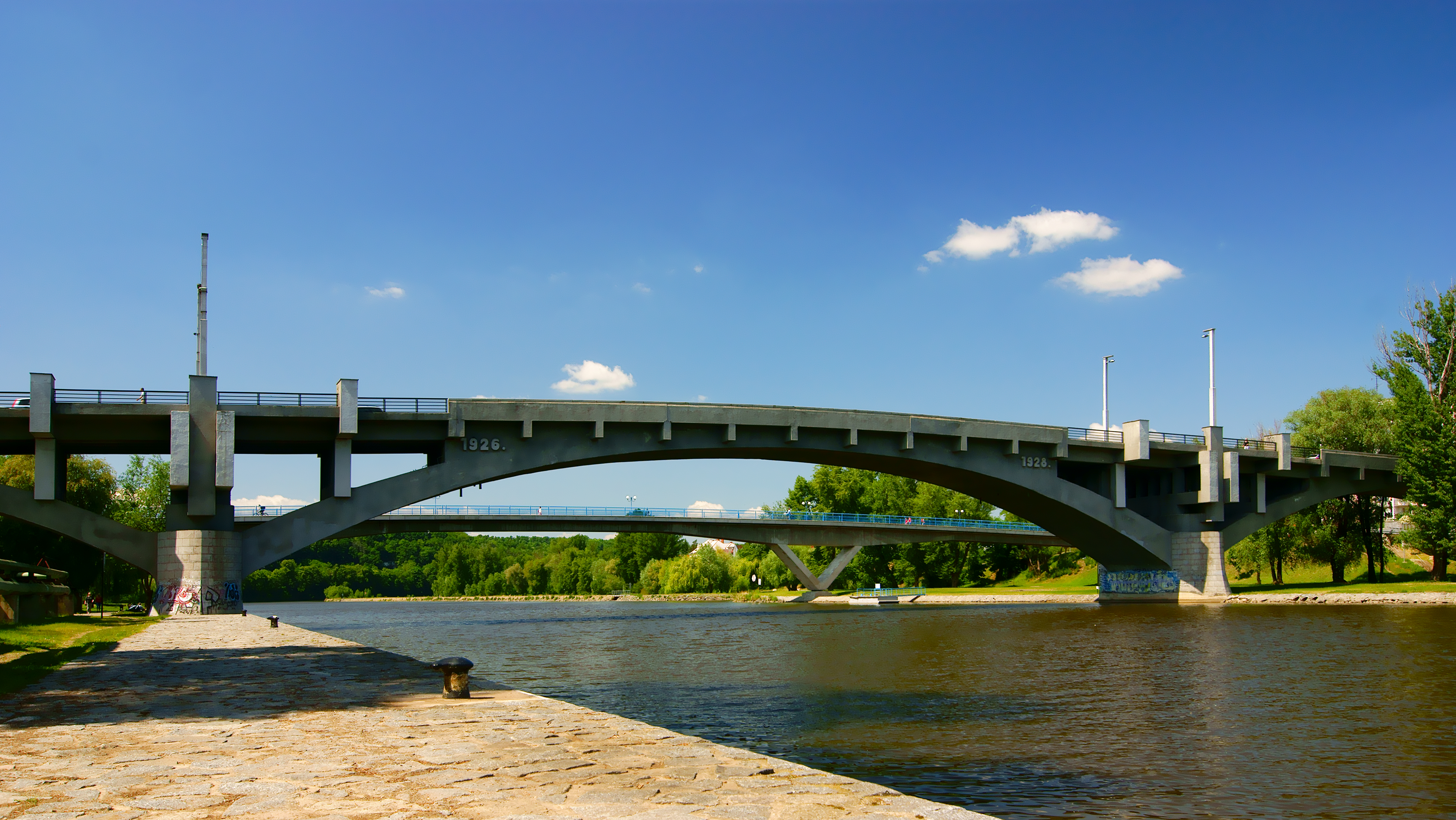
T. G. Masaryk Bridge

Industry is the basis of the economy of Kralupy nad Vltavou, the chemical industry still has the tradition here. The oil refinery is owned by Orlen Unipetrol. It was destroyed in 1945 and put back into service only in 1975.

SYNTHOS Kralupy a.s. is the biggest company with its headquarters in Kralupy nad Vltavou. Until 1996, it was a part of the oil refinery company, and it is also owned by Unipetrol. Formerly known as KAUČUK, a.s., it is a chemical company founded 1954, focused on synthetic rubber and polystyrenes production.

The main representative of the food industry is Bidfood company. It is the largest food distributor in the Czech Republic and a producer of frozen food products.

== Transport ==
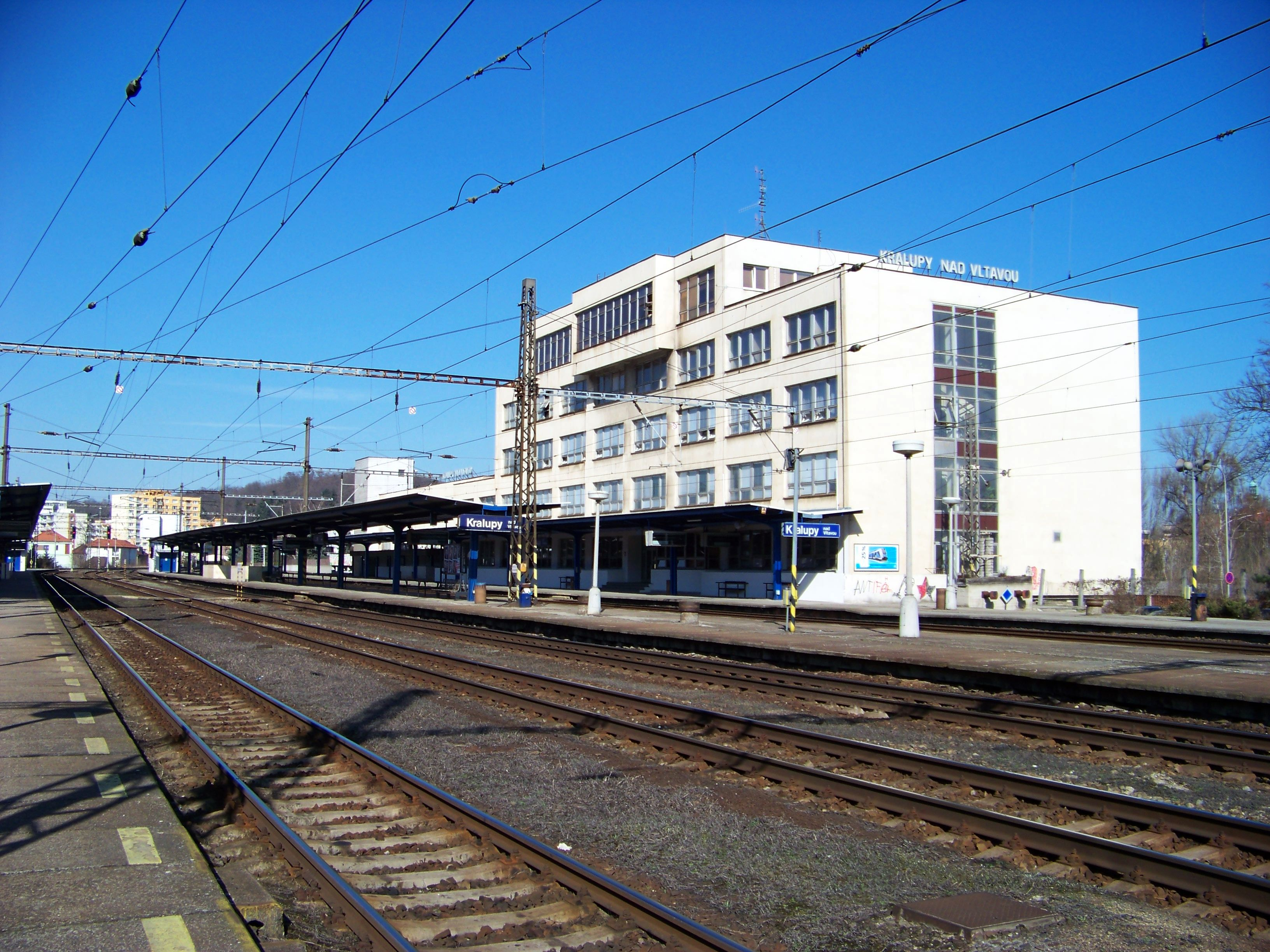
Main train station

There are no railways or major roads passing through the municipal territory.

Kralupy nad Vltavou is a railway hub. The town is located on the major railway line Prague–Děčín It is also the start of the lines to Neratovice and to Slaný. The town is served by four train stations and stops: Kralupy nad Vltavou, Kralupy nad Vltavou-předměstí, Kralupy nad Vltavou-Minice and Zeměchy. The station Chvatěruby, which primarily serves the neighbouring municipality of Chvatěruby, is also located in the territory of Kralupy nad Vltavou.

The Vltava River is used for transport. A sports wharf is located in Kralupy nad Vltavou.

== Sights ==
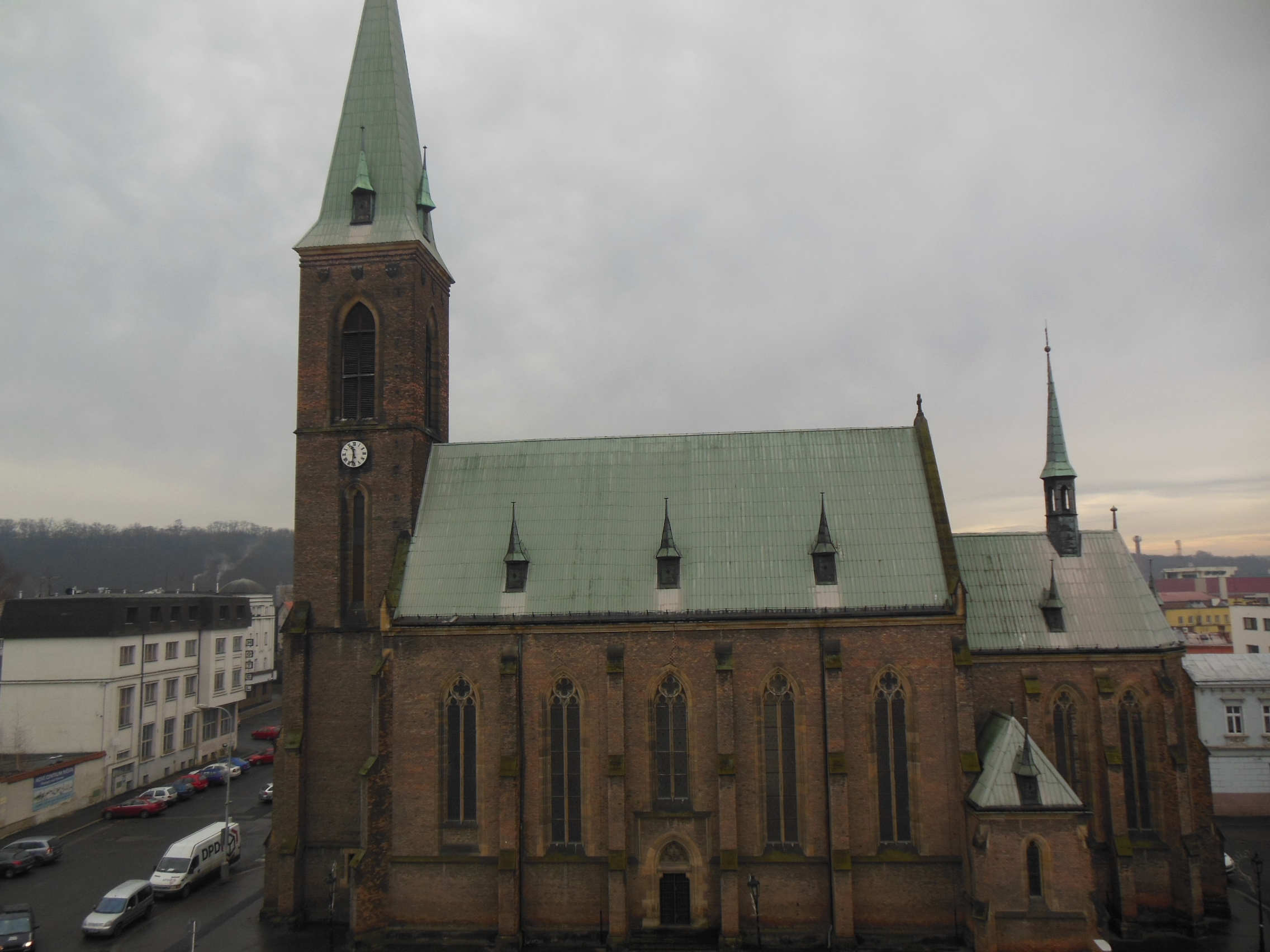
Church of the Assumption of the Virgin Mary and Saint Wenceslaus

The main landmark of the town centre is the Church of the Assumption of the Virgin Mary and Saint Wenceslaus. It was built in the neo-Gothic style in 1894–1895. It represents one of the few preserved historical buildings in a town heavily disturbed by modern reconstruction and industrial production.

The Church of Saint James the Great is located in Minice. The originally Gothic church was rebuilt in the early Baroque style in 1668–1678.

The Church of the Nativity of Saint John the Baptist in Zeměchy is a Baroque church from 1723.

The Good Soldier Švejk statue was unveiled in 2017 in front of the town hall. The statue is looking in the direction of the local drugstore, which was owned by Jan Vaněk, the person who was the inspiration for the same-named character in the world-famous novel The Good Soldier Švejk written by Jaroslav Hašek. Kralupy nad Vltavou is mentioned seven times in the book.

== Notable people ==
- Antonín Heveroch (1869–1927), psychiatrist and neurologist
- Georges Kars (1880–1945), painter
- Jindřich Bišický (1889–1949), war photographer
- Alexander Kerst (1924–2010), actor
- Lubomír Nácovský (1935–1982), sport shooter, Olympic medalist

== Twin towns – sister cities ==
Kralupy nad Vltavou is twinned with:

- Banyuls-sur-Mer, France
- Hennigsdorf, Germany
- Hrádek nad Nisou, Czech Republic
- Komárno, Slovakia
- Miren-Kostanjevica, Slovenia
- Šabac, Serbia
- Środa Wielkopolska, Poland
