= Antonín Heveroch =

Czech psychiatrist and neurologist

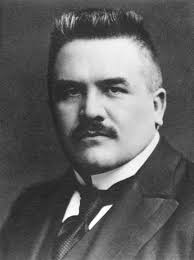
- Heveroch in 1920
- Born: 19 January 1869; Minice, Austria-Hungary
- Died: 2 March 1927 (aged 58); Prague, Czechoslovakia
- Resting place: Vinohrady Cemetery
- Education: Charles University
- Occupations: Psychiatrist, teacher

Portrait of Antonín Heveroch by Max Švabinský

Antonín Heveroch (19 January 1869 – 2 March 1927) was a Czech psychiatrist and neurologist. After working at the Psychiatric Clinic in Prague, he left it and established a second psychiatric hospital.

== Early years ==
Heveroch was born in 1869 in Minice, a neighbourhood of Kralupy nad Vltavou. His father, František Heveroch (1843–1923), was a cantor and choir director. He attended primary school in Vepřek and Zlonice, and grammar school in Slaný. He initially studied at Charles University Faculty of Law, however, in 1889, he switched to the Faculty of Medicine, graduating in 1894. He was a student of Karel Kuffner. In 1899, he was studying psychiatry and neurology.

== Career ==
In 1906, he was appointed an associate professor at Charles University. In 1908, he established and led the Institute for Epileptics in Prague-Libeň (Valentinum). Heveroch was the head of the psychiatric department of a garrison hospital in Prague; in 1915, he was privy to a secret resistance organization, but in August 1917, he was sent to the Russian front. At the beginning of the 20th century, doctors in the field of psychiatry and neurology wanted to form their own organization. The Purkyn Association for the Study of the Mind and Nervous System formed on October 18, 1919; its first chairman was Heveroch. In the same year, he became the director of the Prague Insane Asylum. He obtained full professorship in 1921. He was a member of the Czechoslovak Academy of Sciences and Arts, Academy of Labour and the State Medical Board. He was also Vice President of the Society of the National Theatre (he let the actors study examples of psychosis in his department for some of their roles). Heveroch was associated with the Psychiatric Clinic in Prague, but never became its leader; instead he left in 1904, and in 1924, established a second psychiatric hospital, which closed three years after he died.

He also studied psychology and psychiatry of everyday life and tirelessly popularized psychiatry among laymen. His name thus became famous enough to become popular as a synonym for a psychiatrist.; and so, people used to say, "we'll call Heveroch [a psychiatrist] on you", similarly as they later used the names of Mysliveček or Vondráček for the same purpose. "Pinel is said to be the one who removed the shackles from the mentally ill, Heveroch has [in Bohemia] opened the prison of psychiatry and let it get outside of the walls." In his medical research, he frequently applied the therapeutic principles of psychotherapy (psychagogic, persuasion), but he did not use hypnosis and harshly rejected Freud's psychoanalysis. However, he acknowledged the existence of the subconscious. From a philosophical point of view he was close to vitalism. He refused psychophysical parallelism. His direct pupils were Vladimír Vondráček (1895–1978) and Otakar Janota (1898–1969). He himself was a pupil of Josef Thomayer (1853–1927). Vondráček described him as a respectable man, gentle, sober, with a focus on mathematics and philosophy, with a sense of humor, as an excellent speaker, trainer, organizer and debater. "He was extremely tidy. He was a man "adjusted to the vertical", which means that the pens on his desk were carefully and vertically sorted (...) He walked quickly, often with his hands folded on his back, with his head tilted to the side."

In more than 100 original works and articles, he devoted himself to various topics: aphasia and agnosia, the awareness of our own existence, the rhythm of life and its defects, the intuition, loss of awareness of our feelings, the self-reference and causality, the obsession, delusions, hallucinations, faint states, the soul of a crowd, "children pathologically lying", the restless children, and crime associated with school children, among other things. His book Diagnostika chorob duševních (Diagnosis of Mental Diseases, 1904) became the basic textbook of the Czechoslovak psychiatry, together with the book Psychiatrie (Psychiatry, 1897) by Kuffner (1858–1940). His essay O podivínech a lidech nápadných (On Freaks and Striking People, 1901) vividly depicts portraits of patients (from today's perspective) who had psychopathy or personality disorder. This book allegedly inspired Jaroslav Hašek when writing his Švejk, Heveroch's name is mentioned several times in the novel. His work is pioneering and many of his ideas are still valid today. For example, in the six-part series called O poruchách jáství (On the Disorders of the Self, 1910), he was the first in Bohemia to cover the phenomenon of depersonalization (although he didn't use this designation).

== Personal life ==
He was married to Kamila Heverochová, but died childless on 2 March 1927 in Prague. He is buried at the Vinohrady Cemetery in Prague; his grave is decorated with his bust made by his friend, the sculptor Jaroslav Horejc (1886–1983).
