= Křesetice =

- Municipality
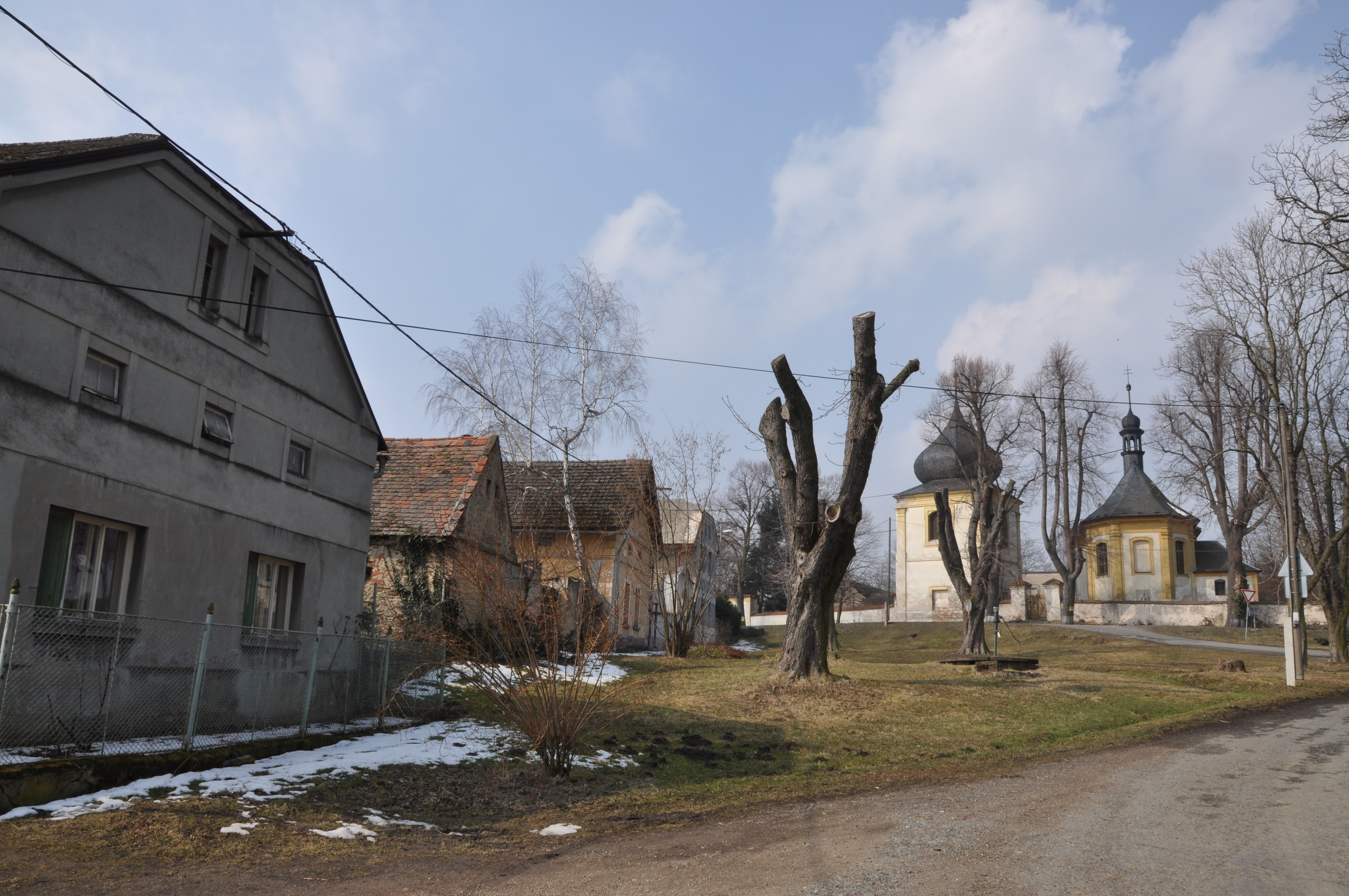
- Bykáň, a part of Křesetice

- Flag Coat of arms

- Location in the Czech Republic
- Coordinates: 49°54′26″N 15°15′46″E
- Country: Czech Republic
- Region: Central Bohemian
- District: Kutná Hora
- First mentioned: 1327

Area
  - Total: 10.88 km^{2} (4.20 sq mi)
- Elevation: 300 m (980 ft)

Population (2026-01-01)
  - Total: 748
  - Density: 68.8/km^{2} (178/sq mi)
- Time zone: UTC+1 (CET)
  - Summer (DST): UTC+2 (CEST)
- Postal code: 284 01, 285 47
- Website: www.kresetice.cz

Křesetice is a municipality and village in Kutná Hora District in the Central Bohemian Region of the Czech Republic. It has about 700 inhabitants.

== Administrative division ==
Křesetice consists of four municipal parts (in brackets population according to the 2021 census):

- Křesetice (542)
- Bykáň (20)
- Chrást (84)
- Krupá (47)

== Etymology ==
The name Křesetice is derived from the personal name Křesata, meaning "the village of Křesata's people".

== Geography ==
Křesetice is located about 4 kilometres (2 mi) south of Kutná Hora and 55 km (34 mi) east of Prague. It lies in an agricultural landscape in the Upper Sázava Hills. The highest point is a nameless hill at 378 m (1,240 ft) above sea level. The Křenovka Stream originates here and flows through the village to the north east. The stream Opatovický potok flows through the southern part of the municipal territory.

== History ==
The first written mention of Křesetice is from 1327. From the 14th century until 1616, silver was mined in the village.

In 1960, the municipalities of Krupá (including the village of Bykáň) and Chrást were annexed to Křesetice.

== Demographics ==
Historical population

Year	Pop.	±%
1869	1,263	—
1880	1,235	−2.2%
1890	1,276	+3.3%
1900	1,217	−4.6%
1910	1,161	−4.6%

Year	Pop.	±%
1921	1,090	−6.1%
1930	1,065	−2.3%
1950	813	−23.7%
1961	765	−5.9%
1970	699	−8.6%

Year	Pop.	±%
1980	625	−10.6%
1991	573	−8.3%
2001	601	+4.9%
2011	666	+10.8%
2021	693	+4.1%

Source: Censuses

== Transport ==
The village of Bykáň is located on the railway line Kutná Hora–Zruč nad Sázavou.

== Sights ==
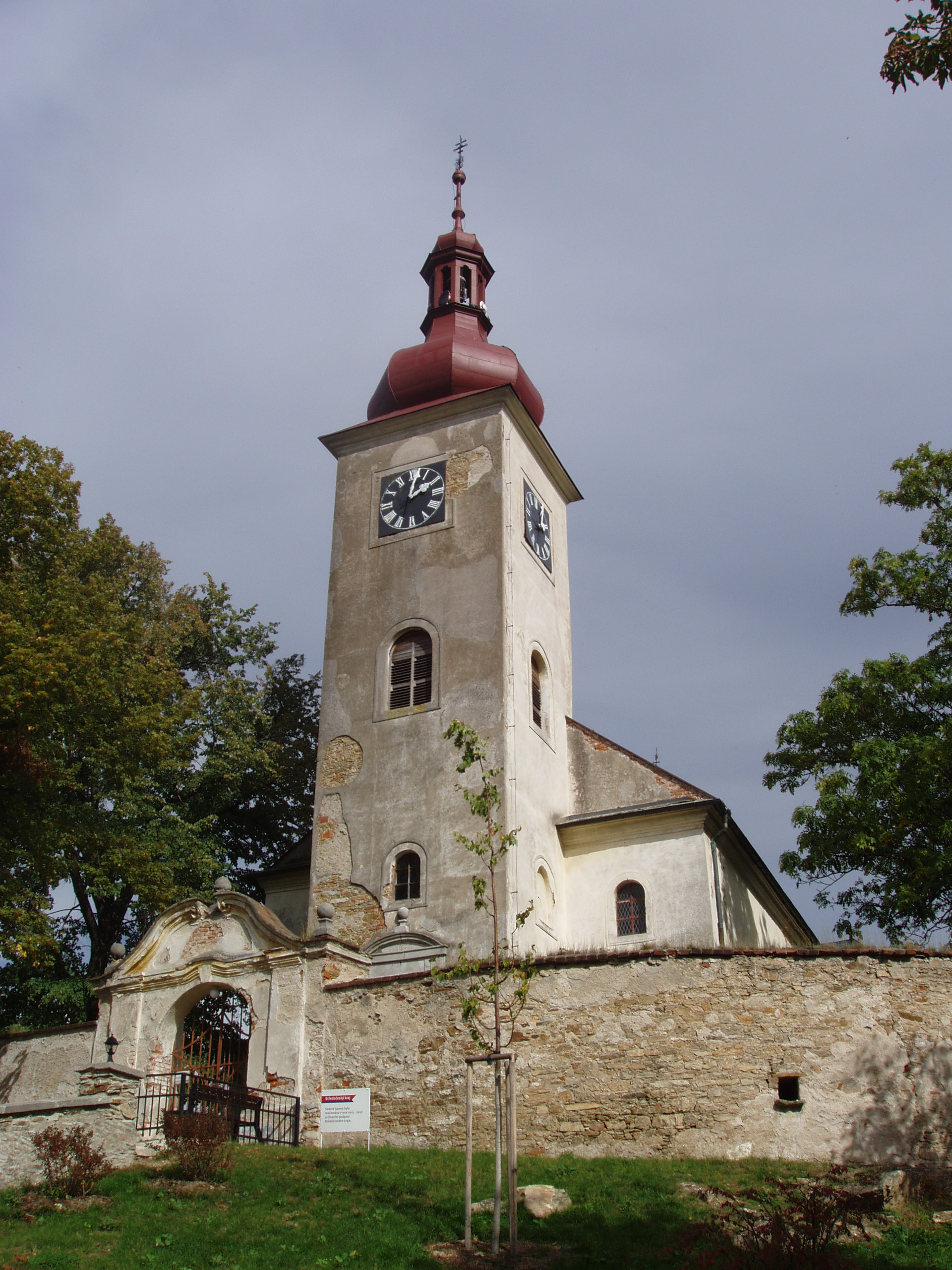
Church of Saint Margaret

The main landmark of Křesetice is the Church of Saint Margaret. Originally a Gothic church from around 1300, it was rebuilt in the Baroque style in several phases in the 17th and 18th centuries. The tower dates from 1680.

The Křesetice Castle was originally a Renaissance fortress, rebuilt into a Baroque residence in the second half of the 17th century. Today the one-storey building houses the municipal office.

The Church of the Assumption of the Virgin Mary is located in Bykáň. It was built in the early Gothic style in the 13th century and rebuilt in the Baroque style in 1720.

== Notable people ==
- Oldřich Lajsek (1925–2001), painter
