= Háje nad Jizerou =

- Municipality
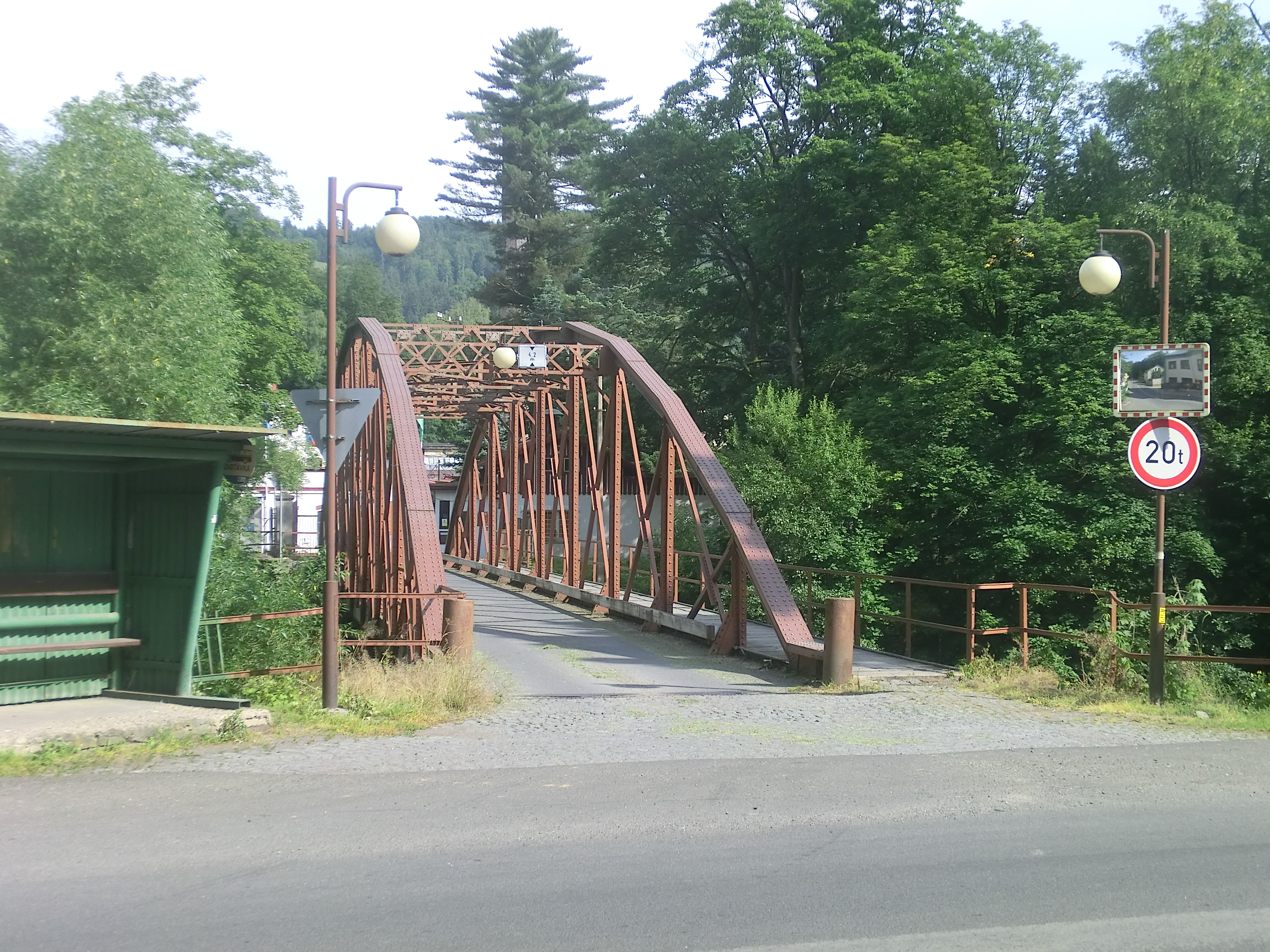
- Bridge in Háje nad Jizerou

- Flag Coat of arms

- Location in the Czech Republic
- Coordinates: 50°36′43″N 15°25′23″E
- Country: Czech Republic
- Region: Liberec
- District: Semily
- First mentioned: 1636

Area
  - Total: 11.74 km^{2} (4.53 sq mi)
- Elevation: 396 m (1,299 ft)

Population (2026-01-01)
  - Total: 677
  - Density: 57.7/km^{2} (149/sq mi)
- Time zone: UTC+1 (CET)
  - Summer (DST): UTC+2 (CEST)
- Postal code: 513 01
- Website: www.hajenadjizerou.cz

Háje nad Jizerou is a municipality and village in Semily District in the Liberec Region of the Czech Republic. It has about 700 inhabitants.

== Administrative division ==
Háje nad Jizerou consists of four municipal parts (in brackets population according to the 2021 census):

- Háje nad Jizerou (59)
- Dolní Sytová (294)
- Loukov (150)
- Rybnice (121)

== Demographics ==
Historical population
Year	Pop.	±%
1869	1,936	—
1880	1,962	+1.3%
1890	2,164	+10.3%
1900	2,080	−3.9%
1910	2,084	+0.2%
1921	1,758	−15.6%
1930	1,647	−6.3%
1950	1,081	−34.4%
1961	1,003	−7.2%
1970	844	−15.9%
1980	776	−8.1%
1991	678	−12.6%
2001	637	−6.0%
2011	685	+7.5%
2021	624	−8.9%
Source: Censuses

== Notable people ==
- Stanislav Feikl (1883–1933), painter
