= Jaroslav Jahn =

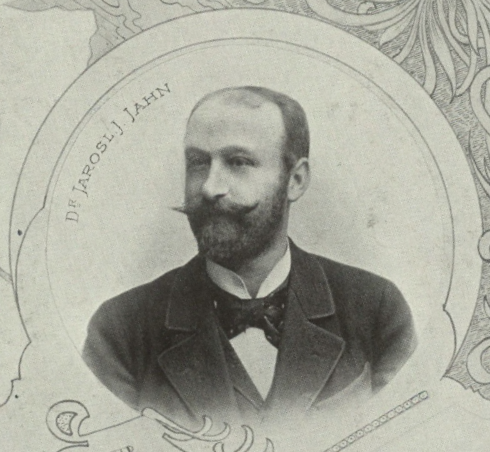

Jaroslav Jiljí Václav Jahn (21 May 1865 – 21 October 1934) was a Czech paleontologist, mineralogist and geologist. He was one of the first professors at the Czech Technical University in Brno.

== Life and work ==
Jahn was born in Pardubice to schoolteacher and writer Jiljí Vratislav Jahn (1838–1902) and Božena née Svobodová. After schooling at Chrudim he went to the Czech University of Prague where he received a doctorate in 1890. His doctoral work was on the minerals and geology of the Kunětická hora near Pardubice. His teachers included Antonín Frič and Ladislav Josef Čelakovský (publishing on botany in the magazine Vesmir). He taught geometry briefly at a secondary school before going to the University of Vienna, on the recommendations of O. Feistmantel, E. Suess and K. Kořistka, where he worked as a paleontology assistant in 1892-93. He served as an assistant to Wilhelm Waagen was also involved in working on Joachim Barrande's Systême silurien du center de la Bohême. He received a post at the newly-founded Czech Technical University in Brno in 1899 and became a professor of geology and paleontology. In 1902 he was elected rector of the university but resigned this position. He helped produce a geological map of Moravia and Silesia at the scale of 1:300,000 and worked on stratigraphy, tectonics and paleontology in Bohemia. He was involved in work related to petroleum geology in Gbely around 1918. He also examined the geology of spas and mineral springs and played a role in the protection of the Karlovy Vary springs. He moved to Prague in 1928 and was involved in the design of the Vranov Dam in the Thaya valley. He died in Prague following a long illness and is buried in the Vinohrady Cemetery.
