= Karel Barvitius =

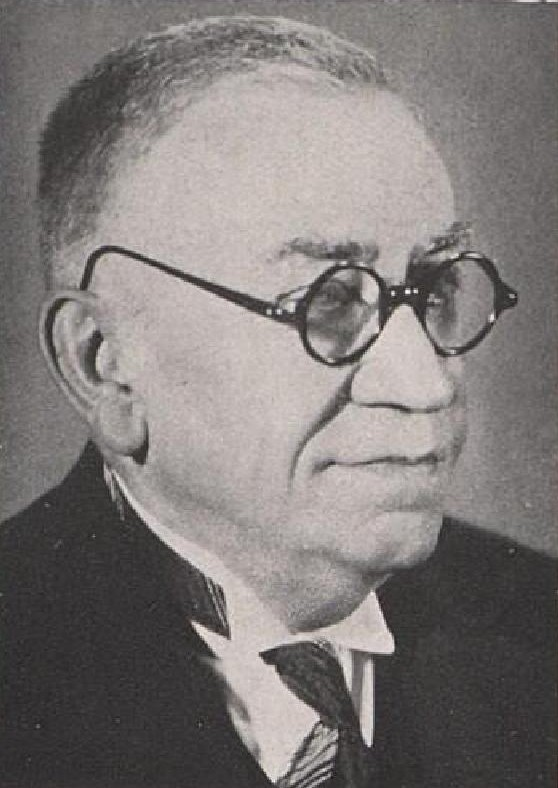
Barvitius in 1935

Karel Josef Barvitius (born Karel Brodský; 9 December 1864 – 23 March 1937) was a Czech publisher of books and music.

== Life ==
Barvitius was born on 9 December 1864 in Německý Brod, Bohemia, Austrian Empire (now Havlíčkův Brod, Czech Republic). After studying law, he tried a career as a composer. In 1897, he set up a shop with musical instruments, and in 1914, he added music and book publishing. His published works were known for both high quality and low price. His son Karel Barvitius (1893–1949) continued his work, but in 1949 the publishing house was nationalized and became part of Supraphon company.

Barvitius died on 23 March 1937 in Prague. He is buried at the Vinohrady Cemetery.
