= Jan Nepomuk Woldřich =

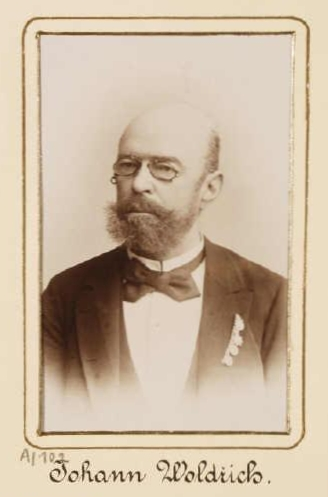

Jan Nepomuk Woldřich (German: Johann Worldrich; 15 July 1834 – 3 February 1906) was a Czech-Austrian geologist, paleontologist and amateur archaeologist. He served as a professor at the Czech Charles-Ferdinand University in Prague.

== Biography ==
Woldřich was born in Zdíkov in Bohemia, Austrian Empire, to the family of a tailor. His father was Jozef and his mother was Terezie. He went to the school in Zdíkovec and gymnasium in České Budějovice before joining the University of Vienna. From 1859 he taught at secondary schools including the Salzburg State Gymnasium (1862–1869), before becoming a professor of geology and paleontology at the Bohemian University of Prague in 1893, working there until 1905. His work included studies on the Climate of Salzburg, fossils from Bohemia and on prehistoric life. From 1874 he began to examine prehistoric settlements, taking part in archaeological digs. He helped establish a school and industrial school in Zdíkov. He was made dean of the faculty of philosophy towards the end of his life. His son, Josef, also became a professor of geology.

Woldřich died in Prague and is buried in the Vinohrady Cemetery. A memorial plaque was fixed at his home in Zdíkov.
