= Psychiatric Clinic in Prague =

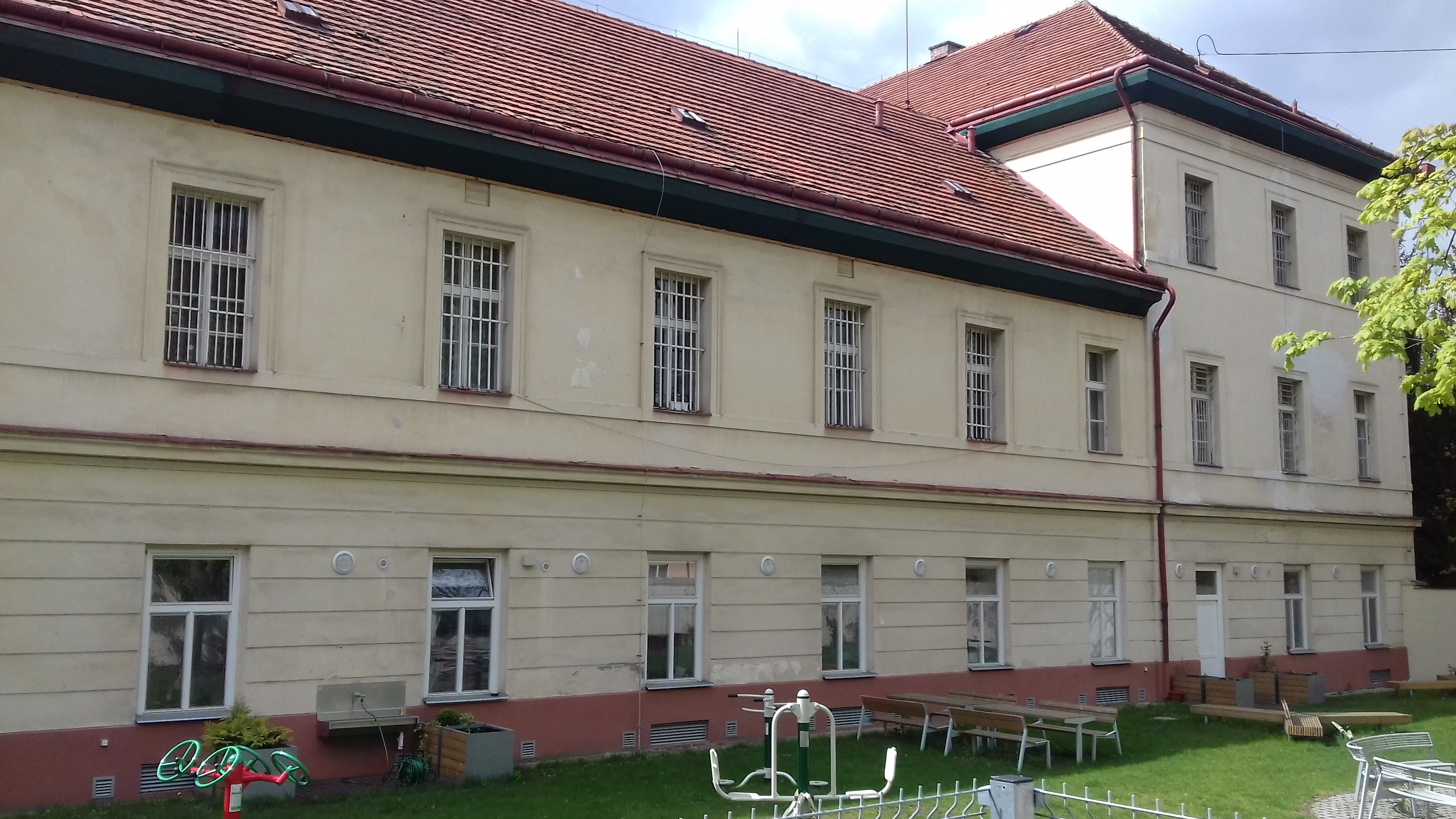

Geography
- Location: Czech Republic
- Coordinates: 50°4′20.34″N 14°25′34.08″E

Organisation
- Type: Specialist

Services
- Speciality: Psychiatric

History
- Opened: 1789

Links
- Website: psychiatrie.lf1.cuni.cz
- Lists: Hospitals in Czech Republic

The Psychiatric Clinic in Prague (Czech: Psychiatrická klinika v Praze) is the oldest psychiatric hospital in the Czech Republic. Part of Prague's General Faculty Hospital, the clinic has five inpatient wards and also provides integrated day treatment. An expansion in 2000 added a day care centre for adolescents. The clinic's hot line, established in 1964, was the first of its kind in Europe.

== Notable physicians ==
- Benjamin Čumpelík
- Jan Dobiáš
- Antonín Heveroch
- Jan Janský
- František Köstel
- Karel Kuffner
- Jan Mečíř
- Zdeněk Mysliveček
- Jiří Raboch
- Jaroslav Skála
- Vladimír Vondráček
- Petr Zvolský
