= Sobering center =

Medical facility

The 2010 ISCD study "Drug Harms in the UK: a multi-criteria decision analysis" found that alcohol scored highest overall and in Economic cost, Injury, Family adversities, Environmental damage, and Community harm.

A sobering center is a facility or setting providing short-term (4-12 hour) recovery and recuperation from the effects of acute alcohol or drug intoxication. Sobering centers are fully staffed facilities providing oversight and ongoing monitoring throughout the sobering process. Sobering centers may be alternatives to jail and emergency departments, as well as drop-in centers. There is a small number of sobering centers around the world. There are over 40 established sobering centers in the United States.

In the United States, sobering centers were created alongside medical and social detoxification programs with the passing of the federal Uniform Alcoholism and Intoxication Treatment Act in 1971. Distinct from historical "drunk tanks", which were typically unmonitored, and had locked cells where intoxicated individuals were left unattended until the individual was sober. People locked in these 'drunk tanks' sometimes experienced injuries, disabilities or even died from co-occurring medical or psychiatric conditions.

== History ==
Prior to the development of sobering facilities, many municipalities internationally operated “drunk tanks”, which were unmonitored rooms or jail cells to hold intoxicated persons. Drunk tanks were found to be hazardous and inhumane, with clients at risk of suicide or other complications. The majority of all traditional drunk tanks are no longer in existence.

Sobering centers became established as a legitimate option within the United States with the Uniform Alcoholism and Intoxication Treatment Act of 1971. These original programs in both the United States and Canada were called detoxication centers, and targeted adults during acute intoxication through early treatment; With over 40 sobering centers in the United States, and more internationally, these current centers are increasingly seen as an important alternative to emergency department care.

Sobering centers were historically funded by cities and counties, especially those with county hospitals which saw large numbers of intoxicated patients in the emergency departments. After the Affordable Care Act, many of these previously uninsured patients became insured under expanded Medicaid. Recognizing the expense of caring for these patients in emergency departments, many states have now used Medicaid funding for the development of sobering centers such as through Whole Person Care grants.

Critical differences between historical 'drunk tanks' and new modern sobering centers include more robust staffing, triage and assessment by staff at intake, ongoing and often visual monitoring of clients at all times, and assessments before discharge. Less acutely intoxicated clients may be treated by medical assistants and peer level non-medical staff, while more heavily or dangerously intoxicated clients may be helped by registered nurses and licensed social workers.

== Models of sobering centers ==
Sobering centers have emerged largely as a grassroots movement across the United States as well as internationally. Most were designed specifically with regional needs in mind, and thus there are diverse models in operation.

A number of sobering centers collaborate primarily with the criminal justice system, accepting intoxicated adults from sheriffs and police officers. Staffing may consist of non-medical staff only, such as peer counselors, or provide basic medical oversight by emergency medical or psychiatric technicians. Care is largely observational to ensure there are no negative outcomes related to intoxication (aspiration, unintentional over-dose, self-harm, falls).

Sobering centers have been implemented to reduce utilization of alternate services (including the emergency department and criminal justice system), provide a safe space for individuals to decrease alcohol related harms, and to offer a dedicated site specific to those acutely intoxicated on alcohol.

All programs received clients from self-referral/walk-ins, street patrol or homeless outreach vans, local agencies, and the police, while other programs additionally received clients from emergency departments, clinics, and ambulance paramedics. Many existing sobering facilities do not restrict the target client to those only intoxicated by alcohol, and are providing care for individuals with co-occurring drug intoxication.

Though the majority of sobering facilities are voluntary, some are legally permitted to hold involuntarily for acute intoxication.

Unlike drug treatment facilities, sobering centers are not intended to provide long-term substance use treatment. Rather sobering centers operate as an alternative to the jail or emergency department in the intoxication phase, with a stay less than a few hours as compared to the more traditional 14-90 day drug treatment programs. However, sobering centers can work as a hub to connect individuals with substance use disorders to appropriate treatment options.

== Surge services ==
Emerging research has focused on a second manifestation for sobering care, a temporary facility established to provide surge services for peak emergency department hours or during large-scale sporting events or holidays associated with increased alcohol consumption.
