= Bohdan Kaminský =

Czech poet and translator

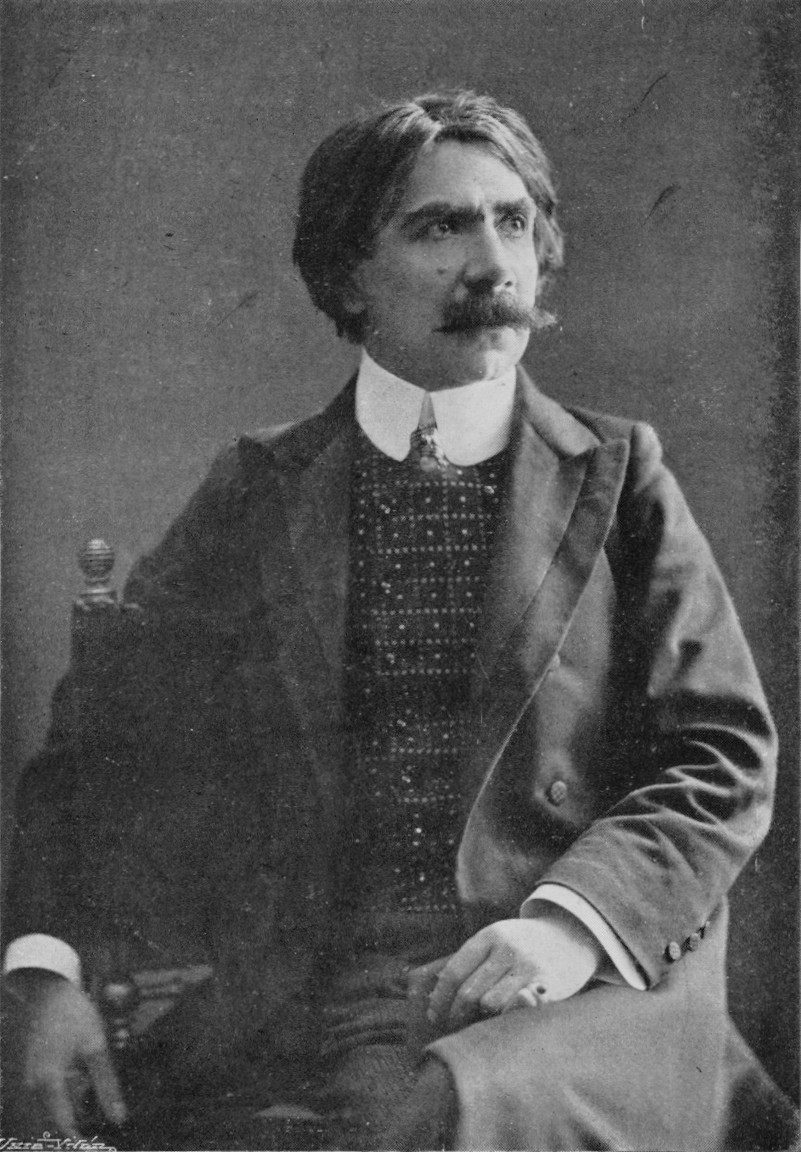
Kaminský in 1909

Bohdan Kaminský (pen name Karel Bušek; 24 February 1859 – 13 July 1929) was a Czech poet and translator.

== Biography ==
Kaminský was born on 24 February 1859 in Husa, Bohemia, Austrian Empire (today part of Paceřice, Czech Republic). He was originally a wood-carver. In the years 1878–1982 he studied arts in Prague. During his life Kaminský frequently travelled abroad. He died on 13 July 1929 in Poděbrady.

== Literary work ==
Kaminský is associated with the literary group Lumír. His verses are about disappointment in love and social injustice but he also wrote humorous, ironic poems and texts for a comedy theatre. Another motive was his birthplace area.

Kaminský also translated from French (Molière) and German (Schiller).
