= Vladimír Vondráček =

Czech psychiatrist

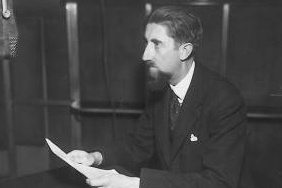

Vladimír Vondráček, M.D. (23 February 1895 – 10 May 1978) was a Czech psychiatrist. He is considered one of the founders of Czech medical psychology, psychopharmacology, dietetics and psychiatric sexology. After World War II, Vondráček became the "legendary head physician" at the Psychiatric Clinic in Prague. He was an important popularizer of psychiatry and related sciences, and contributed to the integration of the mentally ill into normal life. Vondráček is the author of about 225 studies and books, of which probably the best known is his work Fantastické a magické z hlediska psychiatrie (Fantastic and Magical from the Viewpoint of Psychiatry). He is also noteworthy for his three-part memories.

== Biography ==
Vondráček was born on 23 February 1895 in Prague to the family of a delicatessen merchant. He graduated from gymnasium and later studied medicine in Prague, graduating in 1919. His military service was as a doctor with the 7th Regiment.

Early in his medical career, he worked at the Clinic of Internal Medicine under Ladislav Syllaba, and at the Institute for the Mentally Ill under Antonín Heveroch. After receiving a doctorate in pharmacology in 1932, he worked at the Pharmacological Institute of Emanuel Formánek, and at the spa in Ľubochňa and Tatranská Lomnica. In 1938, he was appointed professor of psychology, and in 1946, he became professor of psychiatry, at the psychiatric clinic, Charles University in Prague, Faculty Of Medicine. After World War II, Vondráček became the "legendary head physician" at the Psychiatric Clinic and retired in 1957 after 25 years of service. In 1957, he became the head of the psychiatric clinic, replacing Zdeněk Mysliveček. He is credited with establishing a research laboratory at the clinic, working there until his death. He was a proponent for the unity of psychiatry and neurology.

Vondráček was a charismatic figure of the medical faculty, described as being a tall man with a beard, known for his dry humor. He applied his characteristic expression to his professional works, which are clear, readable and accessible to a wider public. His earliest books and articles date to 1923 and cover a wide range of issues, including psychiatric, psychological, sexological, pharmacology, and internal medicine, incorporating findings and observations of his time. His radio shows were well received. Her popularized a healthy lifestyle by discussing it not only in university lecture halls, but also by writing books and talking about it on the radio.

== Notable works ==
Vondráček's most notable professional work (Fantastické a magické z hlediska psychiatrie) was first published in 1968 (State Medical Publishing House, and most recently in 2003 (Columbus). While the original release was intended for experts, later, the book also became popular among the general public. It was co-authored by František Holub (1894–1965), a lawyer, writer, poet, explorer and Vondráček's longtime friend. The book gives a different interpretation of the mysterious and magical phenomena known from the history, folk tales, legends and fairy tales, and shows that such phenomena could be a result of mental disorders, hallucinations, illusory phenomena and suggestion. People with mental disorders often believe that they can predict the future or read minds, that they're cursed or vice versa 'chosen', that they come from another planet or another time. People with physical defects become an inspiration for stories of dwarfs, giants and werewolves. They assembly ideas inspired stories about water sprites, centaurs or vampires. According to Vondráček, tales about haunted castles, evil creations or living dead were created as a result of hallucinations and suggestions. Vondráček shows the signs of various mental disorders and mental phenomena on examples from history, from myths and fairy tales, but also from his extensive psychiatric practice.

The three-part memoirs Doktor vzpomíná ("Doctor Recalls", 1895–1920 (1973)), Lékař dále vzpomíná ("Doctor recalls more", (1920–1938 (1978)) and Konec vzpomínání ("End of Memories", 1938–1945, published posthumously in 1988) are ranked among the top of Vondráček's literary works. The memoirs show both his phenomenal memory and illustrate his life story, and additionally, they describe the first half of the 20th century with many interesting facts and details. The author discusses openly a number of opinions on people he knew, especially from his medical career. His memoirs end in 1945, because in the following period, it was more complicated to write openly and critically.

== List of works ==
- O psychiatrii, psychiatrech a blázincích (1925)
- Profesor Dr. Antonín Heveroch (1927)
- Profesor Dr. E. Formánek, farmakolog (1929)
- Profesor Dr. Ladislav Syl1aba (1931)
- Farmakologie duše (1935)
- Otravy (1935)
- Čtení o zdraví a nemocech (sbírka fejetonů, 1941)
- Hysterie (1944)
- Afekt vzteku (1949)
- O těle, duši a duševní hygieně (1949)
- Vnímání (1949)
- Klinická toxikologie (spoluautor Ota Riedl a kolektiv, 1958)
- Hodnocení a jeho poruchy z hlediska psychiatrie (1964)
- Fantastické a magické z hlediska psychiatrie (spoluautor František Holub, 1968)
- Lékařská psychologie (spoluautor Jan Dobiáš a kolektiv, 1969)
- Lékař vzpomíná 1895–1920 (1. díl pamětí, 1973)
- Lékař dále vzpomíná 1920–1938 (2. díl pamětí, 1978)
- Konání a jeho poruchy (1982)
- Konec vzpomínání 1938–1945 (3. díl pamětí, 1988)
