= Stanislav Feikl =

Czech painter and portrait painter (1883–1933)

Stanislav Feikl (12 November 1883, Dolní Sytová – 7 January 1933, Prague) was a Czech painter.

He studied at the School of Applied Arts and at the Prague Academy of Fine Arts. For inspiration, he toured Russia, Turkey, Dalmatia and northern Italy. He is known for his pictures of old Prague, rural areas and portraits of women, including naked. He painted impressionist paintings.

His older brother was also a painter, but was less successful and died in 1910.

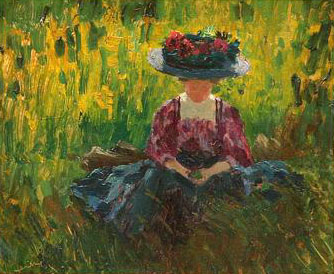
A Woman Resting

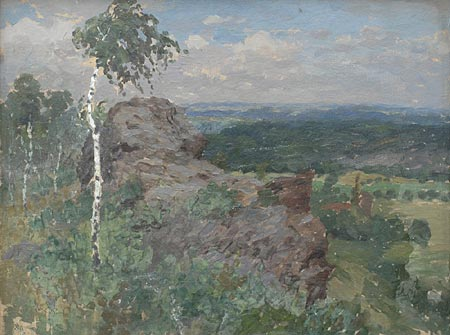
Landscape

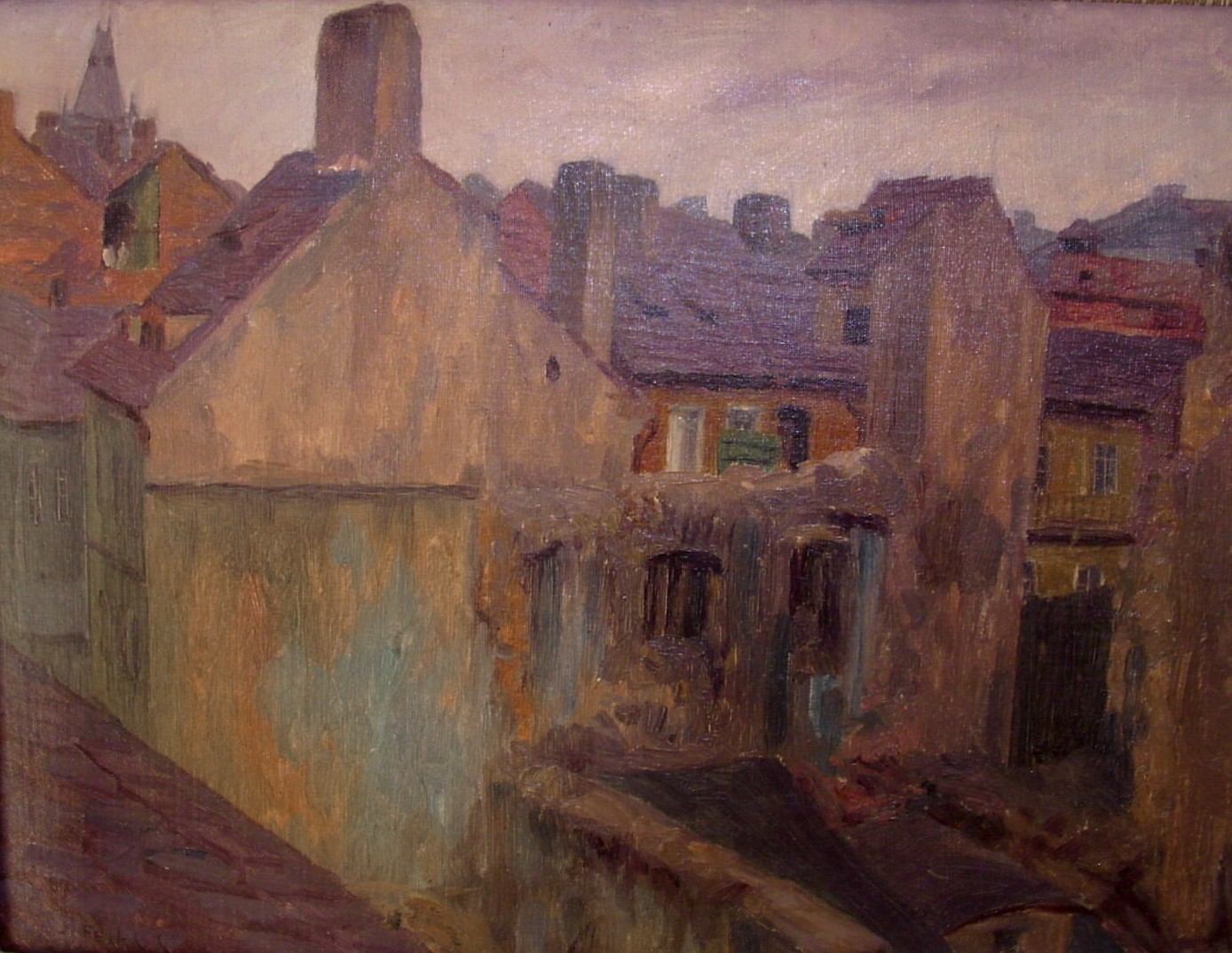
The Jewish Quarter in Prague

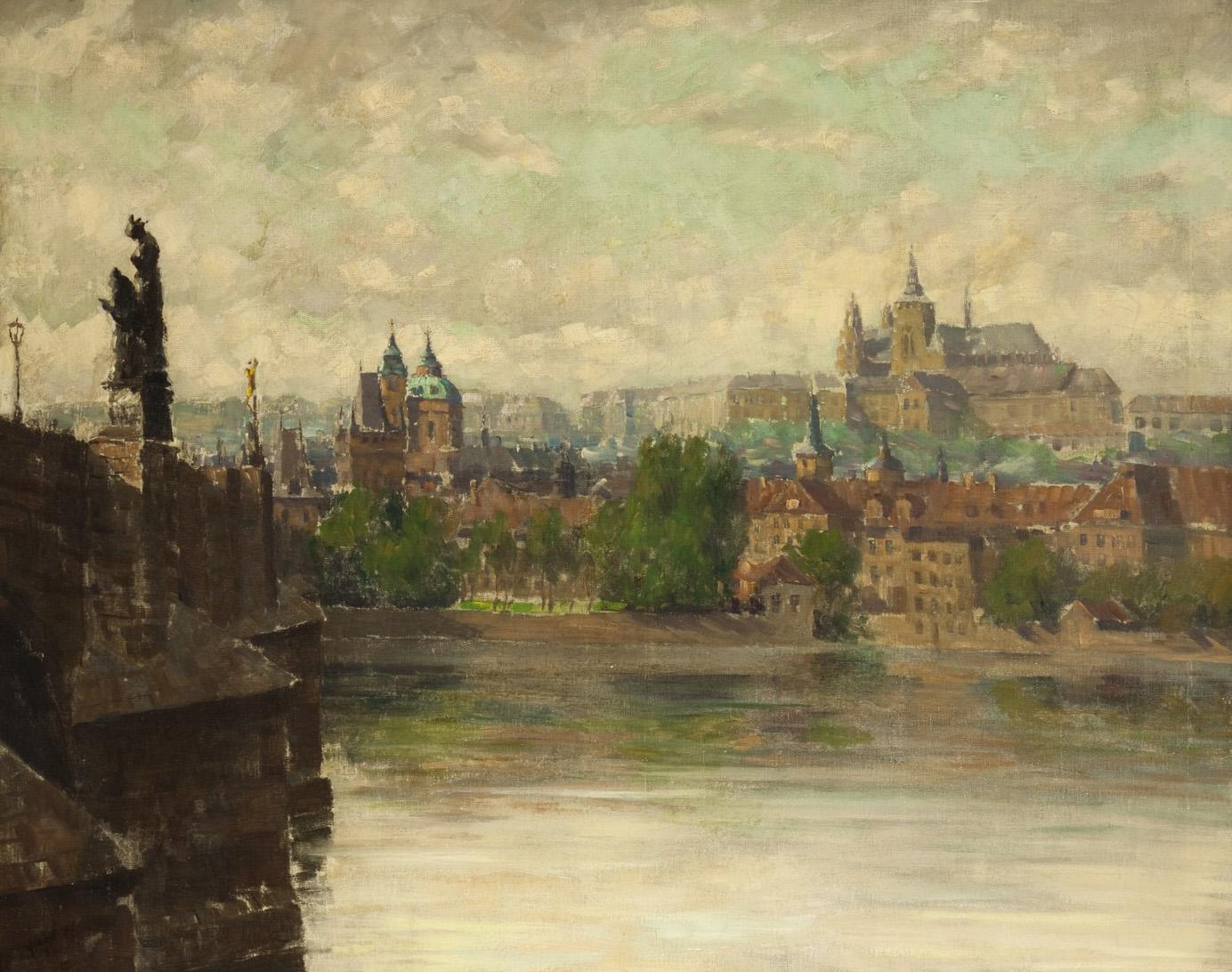
View of Hradčany

== See also ==
- List of Czech painters
