= Oldřich Lajsek =

Oldřich Lajsek (8 February 1925 – 2 October 2001) was a Czech painter, designer, graphic artist and teacher of arts. He became a member of the Union of Czechoslovak Creative Artists in 1954. He was the head of an artistic society named The Group of Eight Artists. In 1985, he was awarded the national honour For Excellent Work. During his life, he created over 3,000 productions of which more than 1,800 went to private collections.

== Life ==
Lajsek was born on 8 February 1925 in Křesetice near Kutná Hora, Czechoslovakia, into a merchant family. In 1944, he graduated from a machinery industrial high school in Kutná Hora. During World War II, he took part in a rebellious organization Pěst ('The Fist'), where he fought against the Nazi occupation of Czechoslovakia. After World War II, he moved to Prague, where he worked in the Czechoslovak Union of Industry. Beginning in 1946, he studied at the Charles University in Prague. During this time, Lajsek discovered his artistic talent, and he graduated in 1950. In 1966 he also graduated with degree in economy. Then he worked as a teacher. He was also a professor at the School of Applied Arts in Prague beginning in 1955.

Lajsek achieved success in his artistic career quite early. In 1955, he was accepted into the Štursa society, and later to the VI Center. He took part in a competition for renovation of premises of the National Theatre (Prague). Since 1954, he had been a member of the Union of Czechoslovak Creative Artists. In 1960, he established an artistic society named "The Group of Eight Artists", in which he acted as the head. The aims of this society were mainly to set up educational, artistic events in the countryside and to look for new places where various exhibitions might be held. In 1985, he was awarded by the president of Czechoslovakia with the national honour For Excellent Work. He died on 2 October 2001 in Prague, at the age of 76.

== Painting ==
His artistic production was very versatile in genres. He was dedicated to abstract painting, realism, surrealism, etc. But his best known production was landscape painting. In this respect, he was one of the best-known painters of his period in Czechoslovakia. He inspired himself in his home Central Bohemian Region or in streets of Prague, as well as during his abroad journeys to Greece or Yugoslavia.

== Selected works ==
=== Landscape paintings ===
- Hořící Lidice (Burning Village of Lidice), 1974;
- Ze Stanice metra (From the Underground Station), 1982;
- Akropolis (Acropolis), 1983;
- Červená krajina (A Red Landscape), 1985;
- Jaro, Léto, Podzim, Zima (The Spring, The Summer, The Autumn, The Winter) (set of paintings), 1985.

=== Abstract paintings ===
- Bílá (A White Colour), 1957;
- Zrcadlo (The Mirror), 1962;
- Modrá (A Blue Colour), 1963.

=== Realism ===
- Ráno v Praze (A Morning in Prague), 1983;
- Slunečnice (Sunflowers), 1971.

=== Surrealism ===
- Smutek (The Sorrow), 1959.

=== Literature ===
- Boučková, J.: Nové tendence v tvorbě mladých českých výtvarníků. Pardubice: Východočeská galerie v Pardubicích, 1968.
- Boučková, J.: Soudobá česká krajina. Pardubice: Východočeská galerie v Pardubicích, 1968.
- Hlaváček, J.: 8 výtvarníků. Galerie ČFVU – Purkyně. Prague: Český fond výtvarných umění, 1960, F 151350.
- Vinter, V.: Krajiny Oldřicha Lajska. Květy, 5. 2. 1987, pp. 46-47.
- Vinter, V.: Oldřich Lajsek. Prague: Svaz českých výtvarných umělců, 1986.
- Štorkán, K.: Oldřich Lajsek – obrazy. Prague: Podnik českého fondu výtvarných umění, 1981.
