= Jaroslav Skála =

Czech psychiatrist (1916–2007)

- Dr Jaroslav Skála
- Born: 25 May 1916; Plzeň, Austria-Hungary
- Died: 26 November 2007 (aged 91); Prague, Czech Republic
- Education: Charles University
- Occupation: Psychiatrist

Jaroslav Skála (25 May 1916 – 26 November 2007) was a Czech psychiatrist, fighter against alcoholism, and inventor of the sobering-up station.

== Life ==
Skála was born in Plzeň, Bohemia, when it was part of Austria-Hungary. He studied at Charles University's medical faculty in Prague, as well as at the institute of physical training and sport. He graduated from the institute in 1939, but was unable to graduate from the university until 1946 because the German occupation of Czechoslovakia closed all Czechoslovak universities during World War II.

Skála wanted to work at an internal clinic and later at the institute of physical training medicine, but he was rejected. He took up work at the Psychiatric Clinic in Prague. Later in 1946, Skála was sent to an international conference about alcoholism in Brussels, an event which determined his later steps in medicine. He established KLUS, an alcohol rehabilitation group, and cooperated with the United States' Alcoholics Anonymous. However, events in Czechoslovakia in 1948 broke all links to the west.

Skála moved from Prague's psychiatric clinic to a new building near the church of Saint Apollinaris. He organized a new anti-alcoholism department, which he headed until his retirement in 1982.

In 1951, Skála invented a sobering-up station, the first facility of this kind in the world. He engaged in research and cure of toxicomania, drug addiction, and alcoholism. He also practiced psychotherapy and family therapy. In 1956, he established a 'section for questions about alcoholism' and headed it until 1981. In 1993, he was a co-founder of the 'society for habit-forming diseases'. In 1991, he was a co-founder of Prague's University of Psychosocial Studies and became its chancellor.

Since 1968, Skála founded over 20 training communities that help people to find a new way in life. He emphasized sports in his studies and in his life. He was an active sportsman in his adulthood and actively attended Sokol.

Skála became one of the most important people of Czechoslovak psychiatry. His methods were the basis for two films, Ikarův pád (Fall of Icarus) and Tažní ptáci (Ductile Birds). In 2002 Skála received the medal of merit for his lifetime work from the Czech Republic's president, Václav Havel.

Skála died in 2007 of natural causes at the age of 91.
