= Jan Janský =

Czech doctor, neurologist and psychiatrist

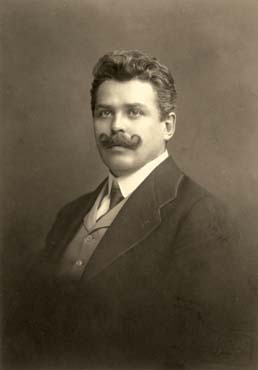
- Jan Janský in 1902, aged 29
- Born: 3 April 1873; Smíchov, Austria-Hungary
- Died: 8 September 1921 (aged 48); Dolní Mokropsy, Czechoslovakia
- Resting place: Malvazinky Cemetery, Prague 5
- Education: First Faculty of Medicine, Charles University
- Relatives: Alois Rašín (brother-in-law); Ladislav Rašín (nephew)

Jan Janský (Czech pronunciation: [ˈjan ˈjanskiː]; 3 April 1873 – 8 September 1921) was a Czech serologist, neurologist and psychiatrist. He is credited with the classification of blood into four types (I, II, III, IV).

== Life and education ==
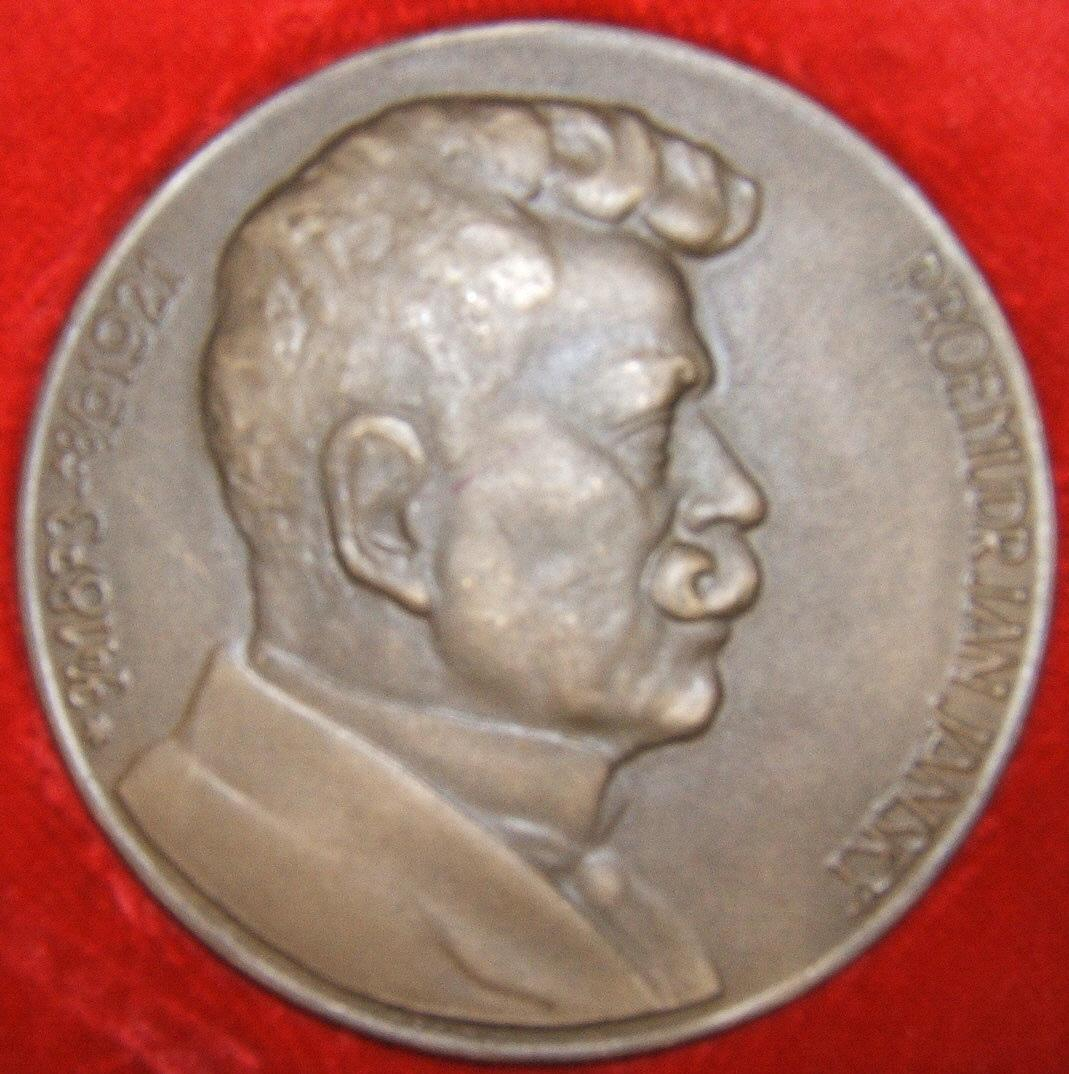
Jan Janský on bronze Janského medal

Janský was born on 3 April 1873 in Smíchov (now part of Prague). He studied medicine at Charles University in Prague. From 1899, he worked in the Psychiatric Clinic in Prague. In 1914, he was named professor. During World War I, Janský served two years as a doctor at the front until a heart attack disabled him. After the war he worked as a neuropsychiatrist in a military Hospital (Vojenská nemocnice). He had angina pectoralis and died of ischaemic heart disease in Dolní Mokropsy on 8 September 1921, at the age of 48.

Janský was also a proponent of voluntary blood donations.

== Classification ==
Through his psychiatric research, Janský tried to find a correlation between mental diseases and blood diseases. He found no such correlation existed and published a study, Hematologická studie u psychotiků (1907, Hematological study of psychotics), in which he classified blood into four groups, I, II, III, and IV. (At the time, Janský was unaware of the work of Karl Landsteiner, whose discovery of the A, B, and O blood types earned him the Nobel Prize in Physiology or Medicine in 1930.) At the time Janský's discovery passed almost unnoticed. In 1921 an American medical commission acknowledged Janský's classification. A similar classification was described by William Lorenzo Moss, except the I and IV of Moss were the opposite to that of Janský's, leading to confusion in blood transfusion until the use of A, B and O became standard.

== Legacy ==
- Frequent voluntary blood donors in the Czech Republic and Slovakia are awarded with Janský medal (Janského plaketa).
- The Secret of Blood, a 1953 Czechoslovak film about his discovery.
