= Drunk tank =

Jail cell for intoxicated people

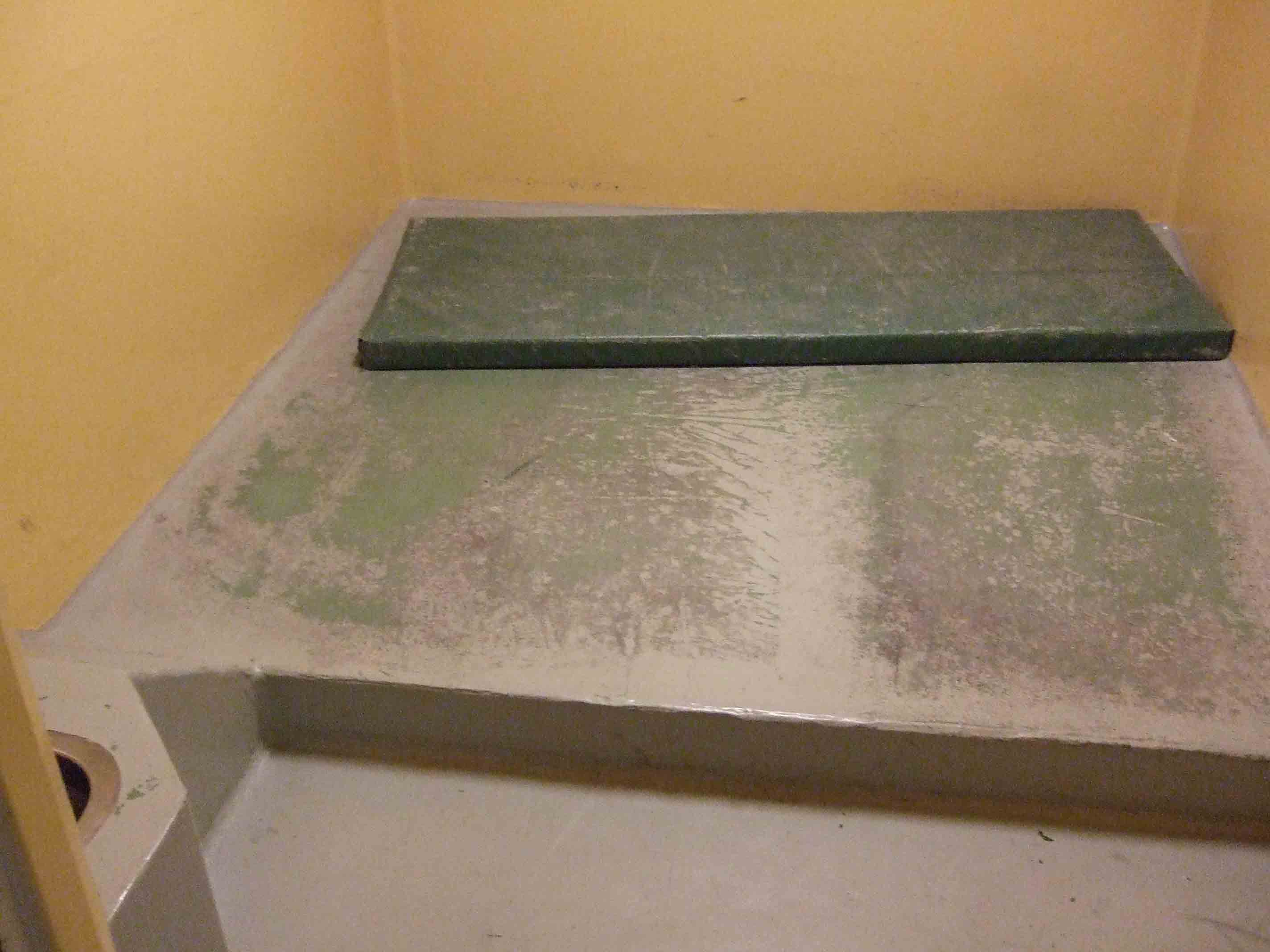
A sobering-up cell in Norway. It is easy to clean with minimal features.

A drunk tank is a jail cell or separate facility accommodating people who are intoxicated, especially with alcohol. Some such facilities are mobile, and may be spoken of as "booze buses".

Traditionally, and in some jurisdictions currently, the circumstances of drunk tank occupants may vary widely, as to whether in fact intoxicated, whether willingly there, whether isolated to protect them from others, confined to protect others from them, or simply permitted to find shelter, and whether legally under arrest, charged with an offense, or neither. Those in need of more long-term treatment may be referred to a rehabilitation center.

== Europe ==
=== Bulgaria ===
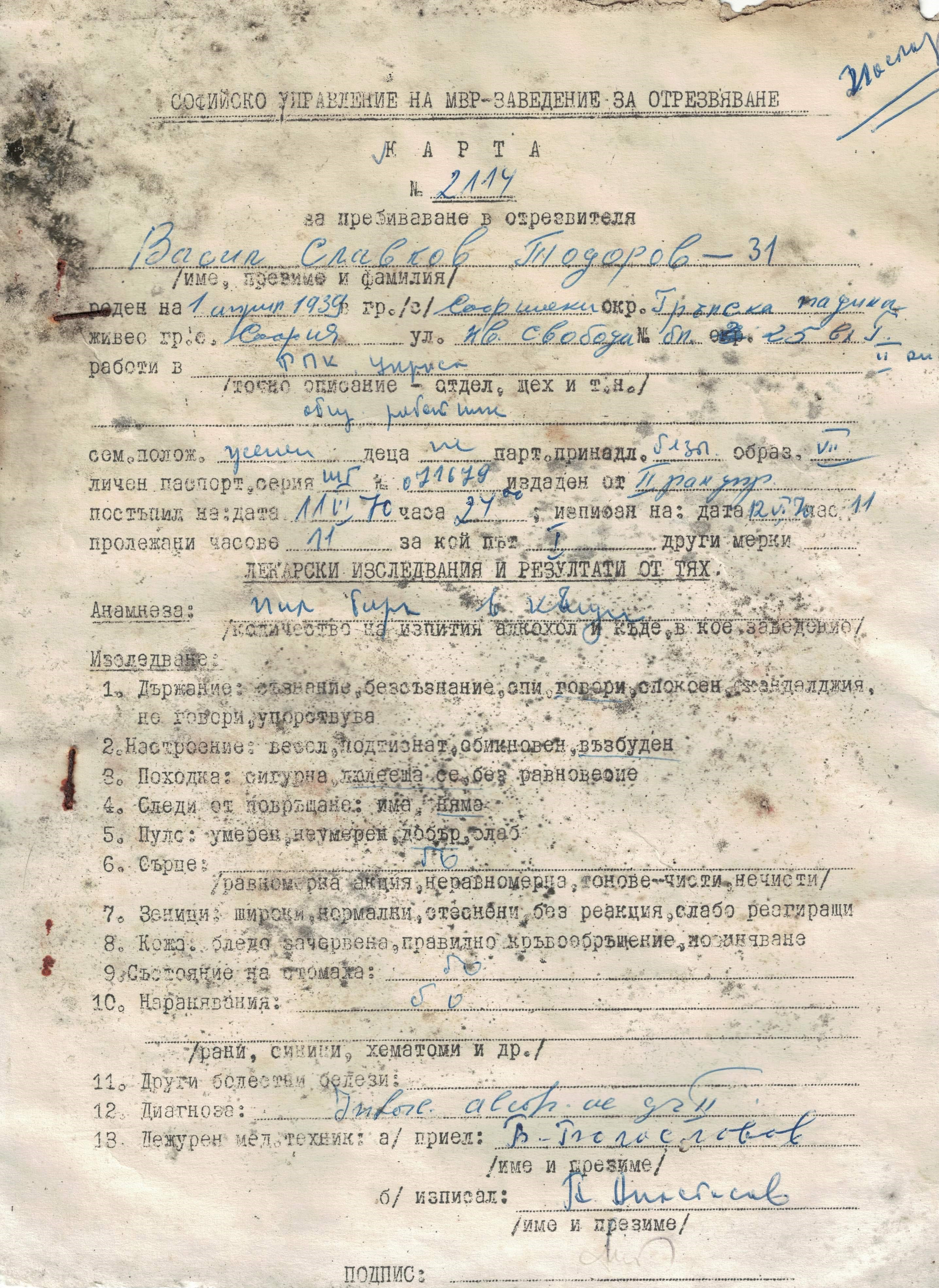
Document from a drunk tank located in Sofia during communist era Bulgaria

In Bulgaria the name for a drunk tank is "otrezvitelno otdelenie", more commonly referred to as "otrezvitelnoto". Drinking wasn't illegal during communist Bulgaria but it was heavily discouraged and excessive alcohol consumption was seen as a negative trait so many people that were heavily intoxicated in public were admitted.

=== Czech Republic ===
In the Czech Republic the name is protialkoholní záchytná stanice, colloquially záchytka. The first such institution in Czechoslovakia was opened in 1951 by psychiatrist Jaroslav Skála; its first patient was a Russian naval engineer. During its first 30 years of service, Prague's sobering-up station treated over 180,000 people. Other facilities in the country treated over 1,000,000 people. During its peak in Czechoslovakia, there were over 63 such institutions.

=== Poland ===
In Poland drunk tanks or "sobering-up chambers" (izba wytrzeźwień) exist in bigger cities (52 as of 2013), hosting a total of 300,000 people yearly. Being drunk by itself is not an offense. If police find a drunk person wandering near railroad tracks, or in harsh weather, they will try to return the person home. If the person is violent or a danger to others, they will be sent to a drunk tank. These facilities charge fees just like hotels, usually the highest legal rates possible, thus they're known as "the most expensive hotel in town". In 2019, the highest legal fee was 309 złoty (about US$80) for 24 hours.

=== Russia ===
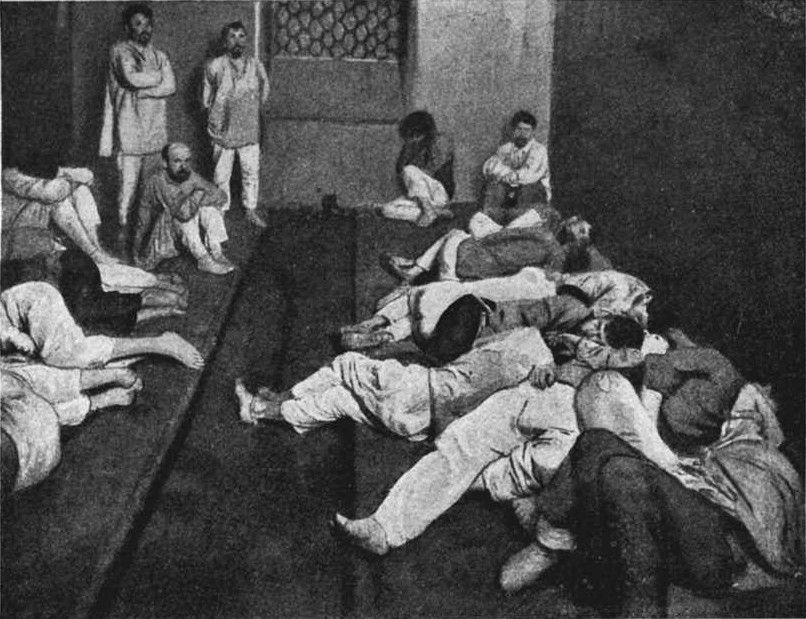
An early drunk tank, St. Petersburg, 1914. The newly delivered clients are piled up on the floor, while sobering men are sitting or standing up against the walls

Such institutions, known as vytrezvitel (Russian: вытрезвитель, literally a "soberator"), were introduced in 1904 in Tula by Fedor Archangelsky, a local physician. Soviet drunk tanks, though affiliated with the health care system and having a feldsher on the staff, were infamous for beating and looting their inmates, which prompted the authorities to close all drunk tanks: first in Ukraine (1999), then in Russia (2011).

In December 2020 the Russian parliament passed a law reinstating the practice of drunk tanks. The move was motivated by the number of intoxicated persons who freeze to death in Russia's harsh winter climate conditions (about 10,000 people annually).

=== Switzerland ===
In Switzerland, intoxicated persons can be placed into a sobering-up cell when they pose a danger to themselves or society. While public intoxication is not a crime per se, some police departments assess a fee for the use of their facilities and the related personnel costs incurred by the intoxicated party. For instance, the Zürich Stadtpolizei charges 450–600 Swiss francs for a night in the ZAB, or "Zürich Sobering-up and Supervision Site" (German: Zürcher Ausnüchterungs- und Betreuungsstelle), which is informally referred to as "Hotel Suff" ("Hotel Booze").

=== United Kingdom ===
In the United Kingdom, the idea of privately run drunk tanks (or "welfare centres"), separate from police stations and funded by the penalties issued against those held there, was discussed in 2013 and gained support from the Association of Chief Police Officers. Mobile drunk tanks, also known as "booze buses", and officially as "alcohol recovery centres", have since been introduced in some cities (Bristol being the first to do so). Newcastle calls its bus a "safe haven van" and parks it next to St John Ambulance.

== United States ==
In the United States, the drunk tank was associated with unsafe conditions resulting in disability or death. Reports from San Francisco, California dating from 1949, showed the dire conditions faced by intoxicated people.

== See also ==
- Field sobriety testing
- Public intoxication
- Short-term effects of alcohol consumption
- Sobering center
