= Orlen Unipetrol =

Czech refinery and petrochemical company

Orlen Unipetrol a.s.
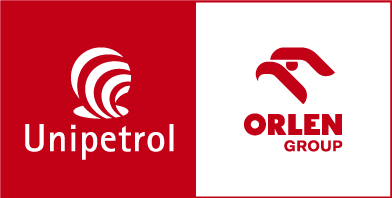
- Type: Subsidiary
- ISIN: CZ0009091500
- Industry: Oil refining, petrochemicals
- Founded: 1994
- Headquarters: Prague, Czech Republic
- Key people: Mariusz Wnuk (chairman)
- Products: Petrol, diesel fuel, polyethylene, polypropylene, lubricants, bitumen
- Revenue: CZK 150.31 billion (2025)
- Operating income: −CZK 46.03 billion (2025)
- Net income: −CZK 46.75 billion (2025)
- Total assets: CZK 74.20 billion (2025)
- Number of employees: 4,598 (2025)
- Parent: Orlen (100%)
- Website: www.orlenunipetrol.cz/en/

Orlen Unipetrol is a Czech oil refining and petrochemical company based in Prague and owned by the Polish energy group Orlen. It is the only crude-oil processor in the Czech Republic, operating refineries in Litvínov and Kralupy nad Vltavou. The refineries produce petrol and diesel, while the Litvínov complex also manufactures polyethylene and polypropylene. It also operates a network of Orlen filling stations in the Czech Republic, Slovakia and Hungary.

Unipetrol was established in 1994 as part of the privatisation of the Czech petroleum and petrochemical industry, bringing several companies under one group. PKN Orlen bought a majority stake in Unipetrol in 2005. It had acquired full ownership in 2018, and Unipetrol's shares were withdrawn from trading on the Prague Stock Exchange.

== History ==
Construction of the STW (Sudetenländische Treibstoffwerke) synthetic-fuel plant at Záluží, near Litvínov, began in 1939. The plant produced fuel from locally mined brown coal during World War II. After the war, the site continued operating and expanded into petrochemical production during the 1970s.

Polyethylene and polypropylene plants started operating in 1975–1976, followed by an ethylene unit in 1979. A new refinery was built in the early 1980s.

=== Formation of Unipetrol (1994–2000) ===
Unipetrol was established in December 1994 by the Czech National Property Fund, which owned about 63% of its shares. The company was set up to consolidate parts of the Czech oil and chemical industry ahead of privatisation. Its main businesses were Chemopetrol in Litvínov, Kaučuk in Kralupy nad Vltavou and the fuel distributor Benzina. Chemopetrol Group and Kaučuk Group were merged into Unipetrol in 1997. Chemopetrol Group and Kaučuk Group were merged into Unipetrol in 1997. That August, Unipetrol shares began continuous trading on the Prague Stock Exchange.

Česká rafinérská was established in April 1995 and began operating the refineries at Litvínov and Kralupy in January 1996. Unipetrol owned 51% of the company, with the other 49% held by Shell, Conoco and Agip. The refineries were upgraded in the following years, with a new catalytic cracking unit built at Kralupy.

In 2000, Unipetrol acquired a 70.87% stake in Paramo, which operated a refinery in Pardubice and produced lubricants and other petroleum products. It also moved to acquire a controlling stake in Spolana, a chemical manufacturer based in Neratovice. The Spolana acquisition received competition approval in early 2002.

=== Privatisation (2001–2005) ===
The Czech government began preparations to sell its majority stake in Unipetrol in 2001. In December, it chose Agrofert as the buyer, despite a higher offer from Britain's Rotch Energy. Agrofert offered CZK 11.75 billion, compared with Rotch's CZK 14.5 billion. The two sides signed an agreement in February 2002, but the deal subsequently fell apart. Agrofert demanded changes to the agreement and refused to pay the original price. The Czech government cancelled the sale in October 2002.

A second tender was held, and in April 2004 the government selected Poland's PKN Orlen. The sale agreement was signed in June. After receiving approval from the European Commission, PKN Orlen purchased the state's 62.99% stake on 24 May 2005.Orlen eventually paid CZK 12.95 billion for the stake, more than the CZK 11.3 billion agreed in 2004.

After the sale, PKN Orlen and Agrofert became involved in legal disputes over plans to sell some of Unipetrol's subsidiaries. In 2009, an arbitration tribunal ordered Orlen to pay Agrofert €77.3 million plus interest. After the sale, PKN Orlen and Agrofert became involved in legal disputes over plans to sell some of Unipetrol's subsidiaries. In 2009, an arbitration tribunal ordered Orlen to pay Agrofert €77.3 million plus interest. Agrofert pursued another claim for nearly CZK 19.5 billion, which was rejected. The Czech Constitutional Court also ruled against Agrofert in 2017, dismissing its complaint.

=== Restructuring and refinery consolidation (2006–2017) ===
Unipetrol reorganised several of its businesses after the takeover. In 2006, it sold its controlling stake in Spolana to Anwil, another company in the Orlen group. In July 2007, Unipetrol sold Kaučuk to the Polish company Firma Chemiczna Dwory for €195 million. The two companies continued working together on butadiene production at Kralupy. Also in 2007, Chemopetrol and Unipetrol Rafinérie were merged to form Unipetrol RPA, which took over the group's refining and petrochemical operations. Some older production facilities were also closed. Paramo stopped processing crude oil at its Pardubice refinery in 2012 after years of poor financial results. It continued making lubricants, oils and bitumen using materials supplied by other refineries. At Litvínov, Unipetrol ended urea production at the beginning of 2013.

Unipetrol gradually bought out the other shareholders of Česká rafinérská. It acquired Shell's 16.335% stake in January 2014 and the remaining 32.445% from Eni in April 2015. This left Unipetrol in full control of the Litvínov and Kralupy refineries. Česká rafinérská was merged into Unipetrol RPA in January 2017.

In August 2015, a fire and explosions damaged the steam cracker at the Litvínov petrochemical complex, disrupting production for more than a year. Repairs cost approximately CZK 4 billion. In June 2016, Unipetrol RPA bought Spolana back from Anwil, returning the Neratovice plant to the Czech group.

=== Full Orlen ownership and modernisation (2018–2021) ===
PKN Orlen bought out Unipetrol's remaining minority shareholders in 2018. Trading in Unipetrol shares on the Prague Stock Exchange ended in September, and PKN Orlen became the sole shareholder on 1 October.

In 2020, Unipetrol completed a new polyethylene production unit, PE3, at Litvínov. The project cost CZK 9.6 billion and increased the site's annual polyethylene production capacity from 320,000 to 470,000 tonnes. The new plant also allowed Unipetrol to manufacture additional grades of polyethylene.

=== Recent developments (2022–present) ===
Orlen Unipetrol began operating filling stations in Hungary in 2022, adding to its existing network in Slovakia. In January 2023, it bought REMAQ, a plastics recycling company in Otrokovice.

In January 2025, Spolana announced plans to close its PVC and caprolactam production lines in Neratovice. The company cited prolonged losses and difficult conditions in the European chemical industry. Spolana planned to cut about 500 jobs but keep its sulphuric acid plant in operation.

In 2025, the expansion of the Transalpine Pipeline allowed Czech refineries to replace Russian crude oil delivered through the Druzhba pipeline with supplies arriving from the west. Orlen's final Russian oil contract, which supplied Litvínov, expired on 30 June 2025.

== Research and education ==
Orlen Unipetrol conducts research in oil refining, petrochemicals and polymer materials, with facilities in Litvínov and Brno.

The Unipetrol Research and Education Centre (UniCRE) was developed by the Research Institute of Inorganic Chemistry at the Litvínov chemical complex. Its main building opened in 2014, providing laboratories for research into refining processes, petrochemical technologies and alternative raw materials. The separate UniCRE company was merged into Orlen Unipetrol RPA in June 2025.

The Polymer Institute Brno is a branch of Orlen Unipetrol RPA specialising in polymer research and testing. It works mainly with polyethylene and polypropylene and also manufactures additives and concentrates used to modify the properties of plastics.

Orlen Unipetrol has worked with the University of Chemistry and Technology Prague since 2002. The university opened a teaching centre in Most in 2004 and moved it to the Litvínov chemical complex in 2015. The centre, which also involves the Czech Technical University in Prague, combines university teaching with practical training at the industrial site. More than 600 students had graduated from the programme by 2024.

In 2016, Unipetrol set up a foundation that provides scholarships and grants for students and schools, particularly in chemistry and technical fields.

== Group structure ==
Orlen Unipetrol's main subsidiary is Orlen Unipetrol RPA, which operates the group's refining, petrochemical and fuel-retail businesses. RPA also owns Spolana in Neratovice, REMAQ in Otrokovice and several companies operating in Slovakia, Hungary and Germany. Paramo, based in Pardubice, is owned directly by Orlen Unipetrol.

The group holds a 51% stake in Butadien Kralupy, a joint operation with Synthos Kralupy. It also owns 40% of Orlen Projekt Česká republika, provides engineering services.

== Incidents ==
- 22 March 2018: An explosion at a Unipetrol plant in Kralupy nad Vltavou killed 6.

== See also ==
- Energy in the Czech Republic
- Česká Rafinérská
