= Oil and gas deposits in the Czech Republic =

Oil and gas deposits in the Czech Republic are small, and located mainly in South Moravian Region. Oil and gas exploration in this area started in the early years of the 20th century. The first commercial oil extraction was in 1919. In 2005 340,600 m^{3} of crude oil and 98.75 million m^{3} of natural gas was extracted.

== Deposits ==
From :

Oil deposits of the Czech Republic are confined to the Vienna - Moravia oil and gas-bearing province. The deposits are distributed over a great number of individual oil-bearing structures and producing horizons situated at the depth going down to 2,800 m. The most productive oil-bearing rocks are represented by sandstones of the Middle and/or the Upper Badenian. The largest deposit of this area is the Hrušky field. Most of its recoverable oil has already been extracted, and it is now used for natural gas storage.

Another region in which oil is anticipated to occur lies in the Moravian part of the Carpathian foredeep where oil exploration still continues. The most important accumulations occur particularly in the weathered crystalline and Paleozoic rocks. Oil from this field is light, sulphur-free, paraffin and paraffin-naphthenic oil. Uhřice and Kloboučky (in the Ždánice region) are the only oil deposits in this area.

Three grades of oil were extracted in 1999 with specific gravity from 856 to 930 kg/m3 at 20°C, 20-33° API and with sulphur content of 0.08-0.32% by weight.

From :

Natural gas deposits are in reservoirs that contain oil. The deposits are mostly located in the south Moravian part of the Vienna Basin. The northern part of the Basin has mostly oil deposits. Natural gas from these deposits is from 87.2% to 98.8% methane (CH4). Its caloric value is 35.6-37.7 MJ/m3 (dry natural gas at 0°C); its specific gravity is 0.72-0.85 kg/m3 (at 0°C); it contains less tan l mg/m3 of H2S. The Carpathian foredeep is considered as a promising area for the occurrence of natural gas. The composition of local gas deposits varies considerably. The Dolní Dunajovice deposit produces 98% methane. The West Kostelany deposit is only 70% methane, and is high in helium and argon, which can be extracted in industrial quantities.

In Silesia, specifically between Příbor and Český Těšín, the gas deposits are mostly confined to the weathered and tectonically affected Carboniferous paleorelief. The origin of these gas deposits, now being developed close to the top of the Carboniferous morphological elevations, has not been deciphered yet. Suggestions that the gas originated during coalification of the local coal seams has little support. The gas is thought to have been formed in the neoid movements which led to the origin of natural hydrocarbons. This applies particularly to the gas deposits of Český Těšín, Bruzovice, and Příbor. Part of the Příbor gas deposit is used for underground gas storage.

Natural gas of obviously Carboniferous origin and age is extracted during so-called degasification of coal seams in the Czech part of the Upper Silesian coal basin. Its quality varies considerably depending on the method of extraction and technical limitations related to degasification.

== History ==
The first experimental oil well in the area was opened on 27 March 1900, near the Moravian village Bohuslavice (today part of Kyjov). The second opened in the same year. Extraction costs were too high, so the area was abandoned until 1917. In 1919, the company Moravská těžařská společnost opened the first commercial well. In 1925 the company had 25 wells in the area. During World War II, oil production in Moravia became strategically important for the German war effort and was expanded by German companies. The largest company, DEA (Deutsche Erdöl A.G.), had 1,200 wells just around Hodonín. Refineries bombed during the Oil Campaign of World War II included those at Most, Bratislava (Apollo refinery), Dubová, Kralupy, Kolín, and Pardubice (Fanto Werke).

On 1 January 1946, all existing oil companies in Bohemia and Moravia were merged into a single organization, Československé naftové závody (ČNZ). ČNZ had 1,858 employees in 1948. In 1958, ČNZ merged with a similar organisation from Slovakia and was renamed Moravské naftové doly (MND). In 1990 the Slovakian part became independent.

Currently, MND operates the wells, underground gas storage facilities, and crude oil processing plants. In 2005 the company had 618 employees.

== Extraction statistics ==
From 2005 annual report:

Year	Oil (m^{3})	Natural gas (ths m^{3})
1992	96,496	102,030
1995	173,383	119,222
2000	204,319	106,899
2005	340,632	98,750

Local production covers only very small fraction of demand in the Czech Republic. In 1999, 176,000 tonnes of crude oil was extracted locally and 5,997,000 tonnes was imported.

== See also ==
- Energy in the Czech Republic

== Literature ==
- Jarmila Bednaříková, Arnošt Thon: Naftový průmysl na území Československa (Oil industry in Czechoslovakia), 1984, Moravské naftové doly.
