= IKL =

IKL may refer to:

- Concentration Camps Inspectorate (German: Inspektion der Konzentrationslager), the agency that oversaw Nazi concentration camps
- IATA code for Ikela Airport, an airport in the Democratic Republic of the Congo
- Postal code for Iklin, Malta
- Ingenieurkontor Lübeck, a German shipbuilding company
- Ingolstadt–Kralupy–Litvínov pipeline, a crude oil pipeline in Germany and the Czech Republic
- Patriotic People's Movement (Finnish: Isänmaallinen kansanliike), Finnish political party
- Patriotic People's Movement (1993) (Finnish: Isänmaallinen Kansallis-Liitto), Finnish political organisation
