= Paraffin =

Paraffin is a general term for various hydrocarbons. It may refer to:

== Substances ==
- Paraffin wax, a white or colourless soft solid (also in liquid form) that is used as a lubricant and for other applications
- Liquid paraffin (drug), a very highly refined mineral oil used in cosmetics and for medical purposes
- Alkane, a saturated hydrocarbon
- Kerosene, a fuel that is also known as paraffin
- Mineral oil, any of various colorless, odorless, light mixtures of alkanes in the C15 to C40 range from a non-vegetable (mineral) source, particularly a distillate of petroleum
- Petroleum jelly, also called soft paraffin
- Tractor vaporizing oil, a fuel for petrol-paraffin engines

== Other uses ==
- "Paraffin" (song) the first single off the 1995 album Salt Peter by Ruby
- Paraffin - WiX command-line tool, a free software toolset that builds Windows Installer (MSI) packages from an XML document
- Paraffin (album)

== See also ==
- Kerosene (disambiguation)
- Paraffin oil (disambiguation)
- Paraffin test
