= Protein crystallization =

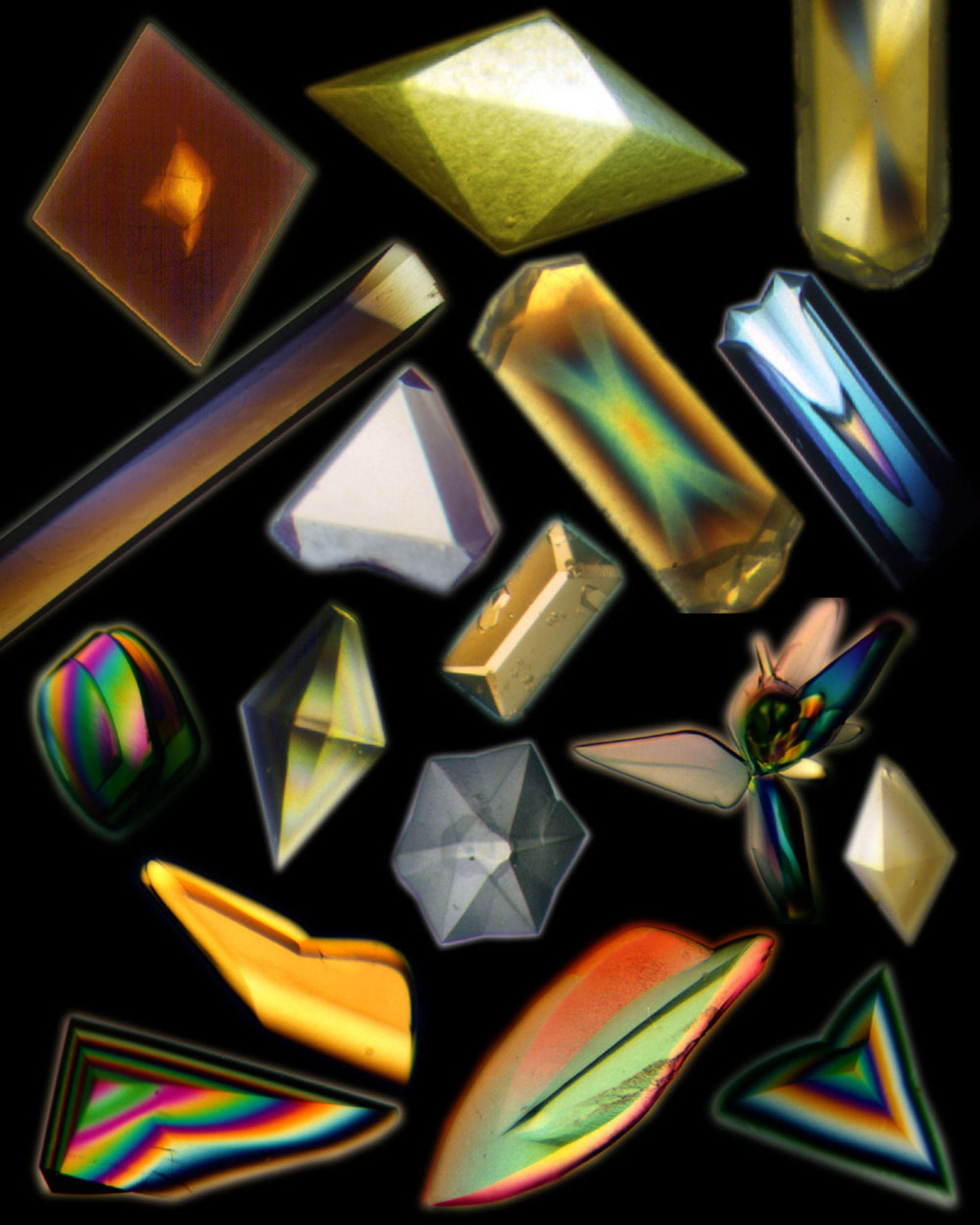
Crystals of proteins grown on the U.S. Space Shuttle or Russian Space Station, Mir.

Protein crystallization is the process of formation of a regular array of individual protein molecules stabilized by crystal contacts. If the crystal is sufficiently ordered, it will diffract. Some proteins naturally form crystalline arrays, like aquaporin in the lens of the eye.

In the process of protein crystallization, proteins are dissolved in an aqueous environment and sample solution until they reach the supersaturated state. Different methods are used to reach that state such as vapor diffusion, microbatch, microdialysis, and free-interface diffusion. Developing protein crystals is a difficult process influenced by many factors, including pH, temperature, ionic strength in the crystallization solution, and even gravity. Once formed, these crystals can be used in structural biology to study the molecular structure of the protein, particularly for various industrial or medical purposes.

== Development ==
For over 150 years, scientists from all around the world have known about the crystallization of protein molecules.

In 1840, Friedrich Ludwig Hünefeld accidentally discovered the formation of crystalline material in samples of earthworm blood held under two glass slides and occasionally observed small plate-like crystals in desiccated swine or human blood samples. These crystals were named as 'haemoglobin', by Felix Hoppe-Seyler in 1864. The seminal findings of Hünefeld inspired many scientists in the future.

In 1851, Otto Funke described the process of producing human haemoglobin crystals by diluting red blood cells with solvents, such as pure water, alcohol or ether, followed by slow evaporation of the solvent from the protein solution. In 1871, William T. Preyer, Professor at University of Jena, published a book entitled Die Blutkrystalle (The Crystals of Blood), reviewing the features of haemoglobin crystals from around 50 species of mammals, birds, reptiles and fishes. These early approaches relied on simple evaporation techniques and worked mainly with naturally abundant proteins such as hemoglobin.

In 1909, the physiologist Edward T. Reichert, together with the mineralogist Amos P. Brown, published a treatise on the preparation, physiology and geometrical characterization of hemeoglobin crystals from several hundreds animals, including extinct species such as the Tasmanian wolf. Increasing protein crystals were found.

In 1934, John Desmond Bernal and his student Dorothy Hodgkin discovered that protein crystals surrounded by their mother liquor (the remaining solution after a protein has crystallized out of a supersaturated solution) gave better diffraction patterns than dried crystals. Using pepsin, they were the first to discern the diffraction pattern of a wet, globular protein. Prior to Bernal and Hodgkin, protein crystallography had only been performed in dry conditions with inconsistent and unreliable results. This is the first X‐ray diffraction pattern of a protein crystal.

In 1958, the structure of myoglobin (a red protein containing heme), determined by X-ray crystallography, was first reported by John Kendrew. Kendrew shared the 1962 Nobel Prize in Chemistry with Max Perutz for this discovery.

== Background ==
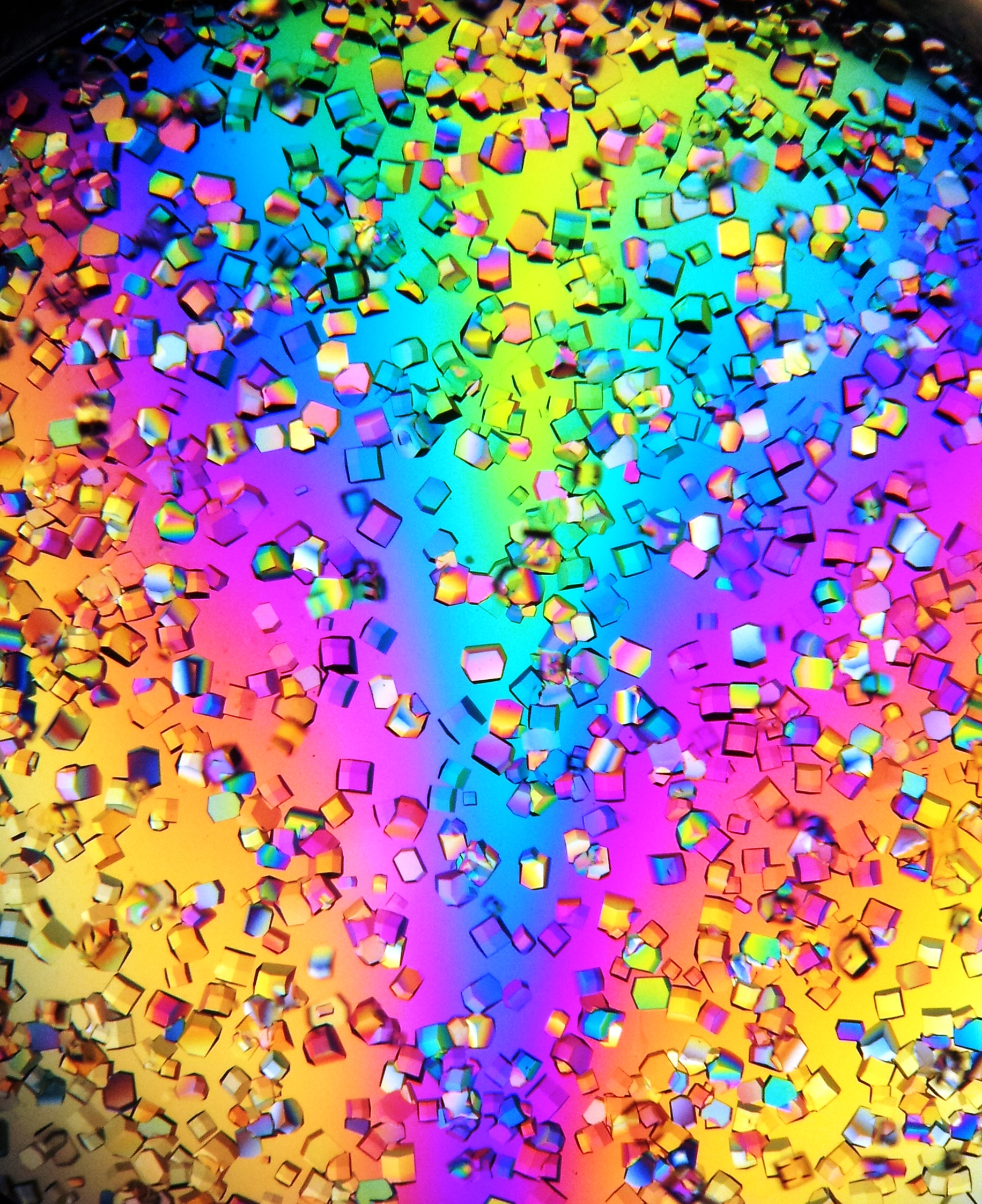
Lysozyme crystals observed through polarizing filter.

=== The theory of protein crystallization ===
Protein crystallization is governed by the same physics that governs the formation of inorganic crystals. For crystallization to occur spontaneously, the crystal state must be favored thermodynamically. This is described by the Gibbs free energy (∆G), defined as ∆G = ∆H- T∆S, which captures how the enthalpy change of a process, ∆H, trades off with the corresponding change in entropy, ∆S. Entropy, roughly, describes the disorder of a system. Highly ordered states, such as protein crystals, are disfavored thermodynamically compared to more disordered states, such as solutions of proteins in solvent, because the transition to a more ordered state would decrease the total entropy of the system (negative ∆S). For crystals to form spontaneously, the ∆G of crystal formation must be negative. In other words, the entropic penalty must be paid by a corresponding decrease in the total energy of the system (∆H). Familiar inorganic crystals such as sodium chloride spontaneously form at ambient conditions because the crystal state decreases the total energy of the system. However, crystallization of some proteins under ambient conditions would both decrease the entropy (negative ∆S) and increase the total energy (positive ∆H) of the system, and thus does not occur spontaneously. To achieve crystallization of such proteins conditions are modified to make crystal formation energetically favorable. This is often accomplished by creation of a supersaturated solution of the sample.

=== A molecular view going from solution to crystal ===
Crystal formation requires two steps: nucleation and growth. Nucleation is the initiation step for crystallization. At the nucleation phase, protein molecules in solution come together as aggregates to form a stable solid nucleus. As the nucleus forms, the crystal grows bigger and bigger by molecules attaching to this stable nucleus. The nucleation step is critical for crystal formation since it is the first-order phase transition of samples moving from having a high degree of freedom to obtaining an ordered state (aqueous to solid). For the nucleation step to succeed, the manipulation of crystallization parameters is essential. The approach behind getting a protein to crystallize is to yield a lower solubility of the targeted protein in solution. Once the solubility limit is exceeded and crystals are present, crystallization is accomplished.

== Methods ==
=== Vapor diffusion ===
Three methods of preparing crystals, A: Hanging drop. B: Sitting drop. C: Microdialysis

Vapor diffusion is the most commonly employed method of protein crystallization. In this method, droplets containing purified protein, buffer, and precipitant are allowed to equilibrate with a larger reservoir containing similar buffers and precipitants in higher concentrations. Initially, the droplet of protein solution contains comparatively low precipitant and protein concentrations, but as the drop and reservoir equilibrate, the precipitant and protein concentrations increase in the drop. If the appropriate crystallization solutions are used for a given protein, crystal growth occurs in the drop. This method is used because it allows for gentle and gradual changes in concentration of protein and precipitant concentration, which aid in the growth of large and well-ordered crystals.

Vapor diffusion can be performed in either hanging-drop or sitting-drop format. Hanging-drop apparatus involve a drop of protein solution placed on an inverted cover slip, which is then suspended above the reservoir. Sitting-drop crystallization apparatus place the drop on a pedestal that is separated from the reservoir. Both of these methods require sealing of the environment so that equilibration between the drop and reservoir can occur.

=== Microbatch ===
A microbatch usually involves immersing a very small volume of protein droplets in oil (as little as 1 μL). The reason that oil is required is because such low volume of protein solution is used and therefore evaporation must be inhibited to carry out the experiment aqueously. Although there are various oils that can be used, the two most common sealing agent are paraffin oils (described by Chayen et al.) and silicon oils (described by D'Arcy). There are also other methods for microbatching that do not use a liquid sealing agent and instead require a scientist to quickly place a film or some tape on a welled plate after placing the drop in the well.

Besides the very limited amounts of sample needed, this method also has as a further advantage that the samples are protected from airborne contamination, as they are never exposed to the air during the experiment.

=== Microdialysis ===
Microdialysis takes advantage of a semi-permeable membrane, across which small molecules and ions can pass, while proteins and large polymers cannot cross. By establishing a gradient of solute concentration across the membrane and allowing the system to progress toward equilibrium, the system can slowly move toward supersaturation, at which point protein crystals may form.

Microdialysis can produce crystals by salting out, employing high concentrations of salt or other small membrane-permeable compounds that decrease the solubility of the protein. Very occasionally, some proteins can be crystallized by dialysis salting in, by dialyzing against pure water, removing solutes, driving self-association and crystallization.

=== Free-interface diffusion ===
This technique brings together protein and precipitation solutions without premixing them, but instead, injecting them through either sides of a channel, allowing equilibrium through diffusion. The two solutions come into contact in a reagent chamber, both at their maximum concentrations, initiating spontaneous nucleation. As the system comes into equilibrium, the level of supersaturation decreases, favouring crystal growth.

== Influencing factors ==
=== pH ===
The basic driving force for protein crystallization is to optimize the number of bonds one can form with another protein through intermolecular interactions. These interactions depend on electron densities of molecules and the protein side chains that change as a function of pH. The tertiary and quaternary structure of proteins are determined by intermolecular interactions between the amino acids' side groups, in which the hydrophilic groups are usually facing outwards to the solution to form a hydration shell to the solvent (water). As the pH changes, the charge on these polar side group also change with respect to the solution pH and the protein's pKa. Hence, the choice of pH is essential either to promote the formation of crystals where the bonding between molecules to each other is more favorable than with water molecules. pH is one of the most powerful manipulations that one can assign for the optimal crystallization condition.

=== Temperature ===
Temperature is another interesting parameter to discuss since protein solubility is a function of temperature. In protein crystallization, manipulation of temperature to yield successful crystals is one common strategy. Unlike pH, temperature of different components of the crystallography experiments could impact the final results such as temperature of buffer preparation, temperature of the actual crystallization experiment, etc.

=== Chemical additives ===
Chemical additives are small chemical compounds that are added to the crystallization process to increase the yield of crystals. The role of small molecules in protein crystallization had not been well thought of in the early days since they were thought of as contaminants in most case. Small molecules are thought to help if/when they are incorporated as "packing bridges" in the crystal contact interfaces. It is currently not possible (as of 2017) to rationally determine what small molecules to use to improve chances of crystallization.

=== Protein modification ===
A classic way to crystalize is by adding a small amount of protease to the droplet, as digestion may yield a more crystallizable fragment by removing unstructured regions.

Chemical modification can be used to improve crystallization. The most commonly used is reductive methylation, which changes surface lysines in a way that usually reduces entropy.

== Technologies ==
=== High throughput crystallization screening ===
High through-put methods exist to help streamline the large number of experiments required to explore the various conditions that are necessary for successful crystal growth. There are numerous commercial kits available for order which apply preassembled ingredients in systems guaranteed to produce successful crystallization. Using such a kit, a scientist avoids the hassle of purifying a protein and determining the appropriate crystallization conditions.

Liquid-handling robots can be used to set up and automate large number of crystallization experiments simultaneously. What would otherwise be slow and potentially error-prone process carried out by a human can be accomplished efficiently and accurately with an automated system. Robotic crystallization systems use the same components described above, but carry out each step of the procedure quickly and with a large number of replicates. Each experiment utilizes tiny amounts of solution, and the advantage of the smaller size is two-fold: the smaller sample sizes not only cut-down on expenditure of purified protein, but smaller amounts of solution lead to quicker crystallizations. Each experiment is monitored by a camera which detects crystal growth.

=== Protein engineering ===
Proteins can be engineered to improve the chance of successful protein crystallization. A common way is by trimming the recombinant construct to remove N- and C- terminal parts, which are frequently disordered or poorly structured ("high entropy").

Surface entropy reduction entails replacing surface residue clusters with high conformational entropy (usually lysine, glutamate, and glutamine) with alanines. In a similar vein, replacing lysine with arginine in bulk has proven useful. It is also possible to engineer in crystal contacts by mutating residues.

An even more advanced method involves the use of "chaperone" proteins known to be more crystallizable. This can be achieved by designing a fusion protein consisting of the protein with unknown structure and a protein domain known to crystalize well. The interaction in question can also be intermolecular, for example between the candidate protein and some antibody Fab fragments selected to bind tightly to the protein, or between a candidate-maltose-binding protein (MBP) fusion and a protein specifically designed to bind MBP.

Many methods for protein engineering require some forward knowledge of protein structure, either simply knowing what residues are surface or buried or knowing the full tertiary structure. Modern protein structure prediction tools are largely sufficient. It is also possible to predict the result of crystallization using these methods.

Cystine residues on the surface tend to cause trouble for recombinant protein production by causing aggregation. They can be replaced with alanines. This is not an issue with crystallization per se, but is commonly encountered with structure determination nevertheless.

== Applications ==
Macromolecular structures can be determined from protein crystal using a variety of methods, including X-ray diffraction/X-ray crystallography, cryogenic electron microscopy (CryoEM) (including electron crystallography and microcrystal electron diffraction (MicroED)), small-angle X-ray scattering, and neutron diffraction. See also Structural biology.

Crystallization of proteins can also be useful in the formulation of proteins for pharmaceutical purposes. Crystallization allows for the formation and purification of many active pharmaceutical ingredients. The generating of solid particles with desired crystal form and purity is crucial for controlling the physiochemical properties (the physical and chemical characteristics of a substance, such as solubility, density, pH, and stability) of proteins.

== See also ==
- Crystal engineering
- Crystal growth
- Crystal optics
- Crystal system
- Crystallization processes
- Crystallographic database
- Crystallographic group
- Diffraction
- Electron crystallography
- Electron diffraction
- Neutron crystallography
- Neutron diffraction
- Structural biology
- X-ray diffraction
