= RWE Supply & Trading CZ =

Czech gas company

- Type: Subsidiary
- Industry: Oil and gas industry
- Predecessor: Transgas, a.s.
- Founded: 2001
- Headquarters: Prague, Czech Republic
- Key people: Dr. Wolfgang Peters (CEO)
- Products: Natural gas
- Revenue: ▲US$5 billion (2006)
- Operating income: −12,858,722,000 Czech koruna (2023)
- Net income: 203,884,000 Czech koruna (2023)
- Total assets: 6,982,845,000 Czech koruna (2023)
- Number of employees: 19 (2020)
- Parent: RWE Gas International N.V. (100%)
- Website: www.rwe.cz/o-rwe/rwe-supply-trading/

RWE Supply & Trading CZ is the largest natural gas trading company in the Czech Republic. It is owned by the German energy company RWE.

The group used to own pipelines from Lanžhot on Czech–Slovak border to Germany. Its market position deteriorated in 1997 when the competing Yamal-Europe pipeline was put into operation. Another threat was the Nord Stream 1 linking Russia and Germany via Baltic sea. Its past subsidiaries included RWE Gas Storage (owns and operates several underground storages located in the Czech Republic). In December 2021, RWE put the gas storage business up for sale.

== See also ==
- Energy in the Czech Republic
