= Libiš =

Municipality in the Czech Republic

- Municipality
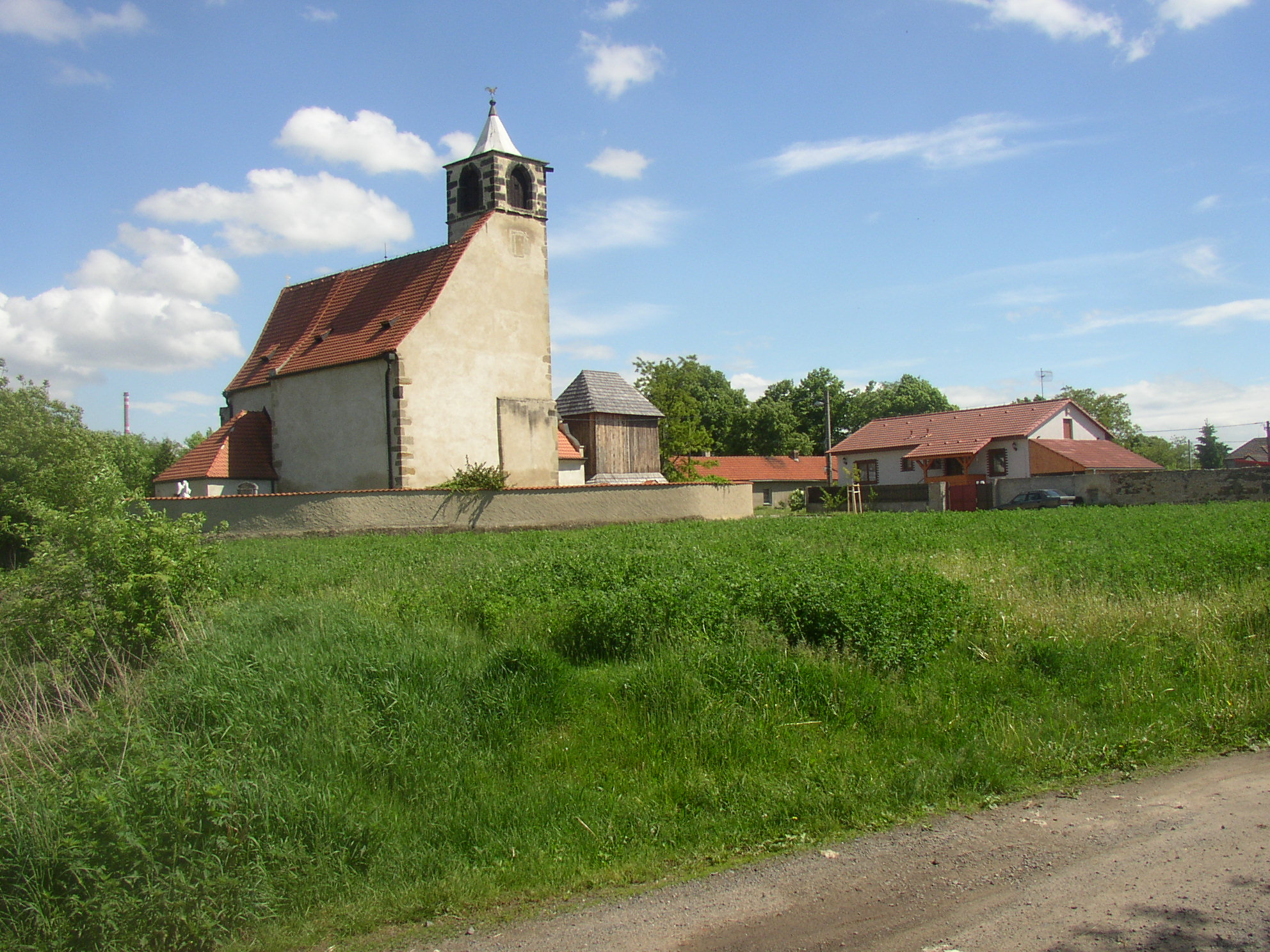
- Church of Saint James the Great

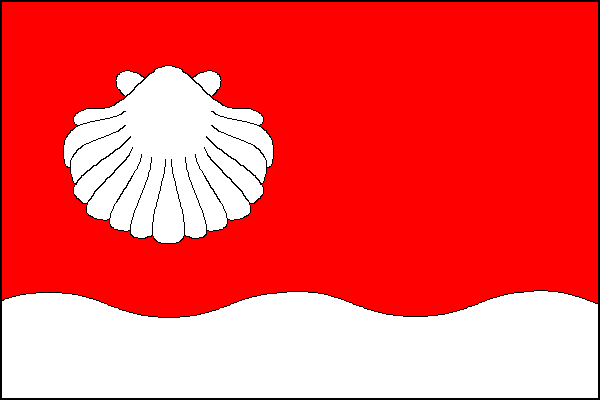
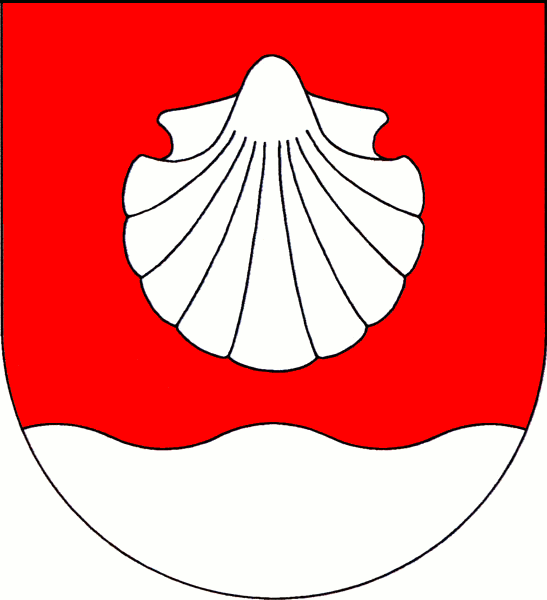
- Flag Coat of arms

- Location in the Czech Republic
- Coordinates: 50°16′27″N 14°30′9″E
- Country: Czech Republic
- Region: Central Bohemian
- District: Mělník
- First mentioned: 1323

Area
  - Total: 7.12 km^{2} (2.75 sq mi)
- Elevation: 165 m (541 ft)

Population (2026-01-01)
  - Total: 2,425
  - Density: 341/km^{2} (882/sq mi)
- Time zone: UTC+1 (CET)
  - Summer (DST): UTC+2 (CEST)
- Postal code: 277 11
- Website: www.libis.cz

Libiš is a municipality and village in Mělník District in the Central Bohemian Region of the Czech Republic. It has about 2,400 inhabitants.

== Etymology ==
The name was derived from the personal name Libich.

== Geography ==
Libiš is located about 18 kilometres (11 mi) north of Prague and creates a conurbation with the neighbouring town of Neratovice. It lies in a flat landscape in the Central Elbe Table. The Elbe River flows along the municipal border. Part of the Úpor – Černínovsko Nature Reserve is located in the municipal territory.

== History ==
The first written mention of Libiš is from 1323. Until the end of World War I, it was purely an agricultural village.

== Demographics ==
Historical population

Year	Pop.	±%
1869	375	—
1880	429	+14.4%
1890	444	+3.5%
1900	507	+14.2%
1910	649	+28.0%

Year	Pop.	±%
1921	722	+11.2%
1930	1,352	+87.3%
1950	1,967	+45.5%
1961	2,272	+15.5%
1970	2,074	−8.7%

Year	Pop.	±%
1980	1,851	−10.8%
1991	1,719	−7.1%
2001	1,769	+2.9%
2011	2,067	+16.8%
2021	2,421	+17.1%

Source: Censuses

== Economy ==
A large part of the premises of the Spolana chemical factory is located in the territory of Libiš.

== Transport ==
The I/9 road (the section that connects the D8 motorway with Mělník) runs through the municipality.

== Sights ==
There are two churches in Libiš. The Church of Saint James the Great was built in the Gothic style in 1391 and modified in the 16th and 17th centuries. A separate wooden bell tower stands next to the church.

The Evangelical church was built in the Baroque style in 1789–1803.
