= Kerosene (disambiguation) =

Kerosene is a combustible hydrocarbon liquid fuel derived from petroleum.

Kerosene may also refer to:

- "Kerosene", a song by Bad Religion, from the 1993 album Recipe for Hate
- "Kerosene", a song by Big Black, from the 1986 album Atomizer
- "Kerosene", a song by Crystal Castles, from the 2012 album III
- "Kerosene!", a song by Yves Tumor and Jeremiah Raisen, from the 2020 album Heaven to a Tortured Mind
- "Kerosene", a song by Biig Piig, from the 2023 mixtape Bubblegum
- "Kerosene", a song by The Warning, from the 2026 album Everything's Falling
- Kerosene (album), the debut album of Miranda Lambert

- "Kerosene" (song), the title track to this album

- Kerosene, a novel written by Chris Wooding

== See also ==
- Paraffin (disambiguation)
- Kerosene lamp
- Pressurised-burner stoves
- Naphtha
