= Adria–Wien Pipeline =

Crude oil pipeline in Austria

Location
- Country: Austria
- Direction: west-east
- Start: Transalpine Pipeline, Würmlach
- To: Schwechat Refinery

General information
- Type: oil
- Partners: OMV, BP Austria, Shell Austria, Esso Austria, Agip
- Operator: Adria-Wien Pipeline GmbH
- Commissioned: 1970

Technical information
- Length: 420 km (260 mi)
- Maximum discharge: 8 million tons per year

The Adria–Wien Pipeline (AWP) is a crude oil pipeline, which connects the Transalpine Pipeline from Würmlach at the Italian-Austrian border with the Schwechat Refinery near Vienna, Austria. It allows oil supplies to Austria from the Italian oil terminal in Trieste.

== History ==
The planning of the pipeline started in 1965 with establishment of Adria–Wien Pipeline GmbH. The construction started in 1969 and the pipeline was commissioned in 1970.

== Technical features ==
The length of the pipeline is 420 kilometres (260 mi). It has also a 14 kilometres (8.7 mi) long branch line to Lannach. The diameter of the main pipeline is 18 inches (460 mm) and it consists of 12 pumping stations. The capacity of the pipeline is 8 million tons of crude oil per year.

== Operating company ==
The pipeline is operated by Adria–Wien Pipeline GmbH, in which OMV owns 76%. Other shareholders are BP Austria, Shell Austria, Esso Austria and Agip.
