= Kötschach-Mauthen =

- Municipality
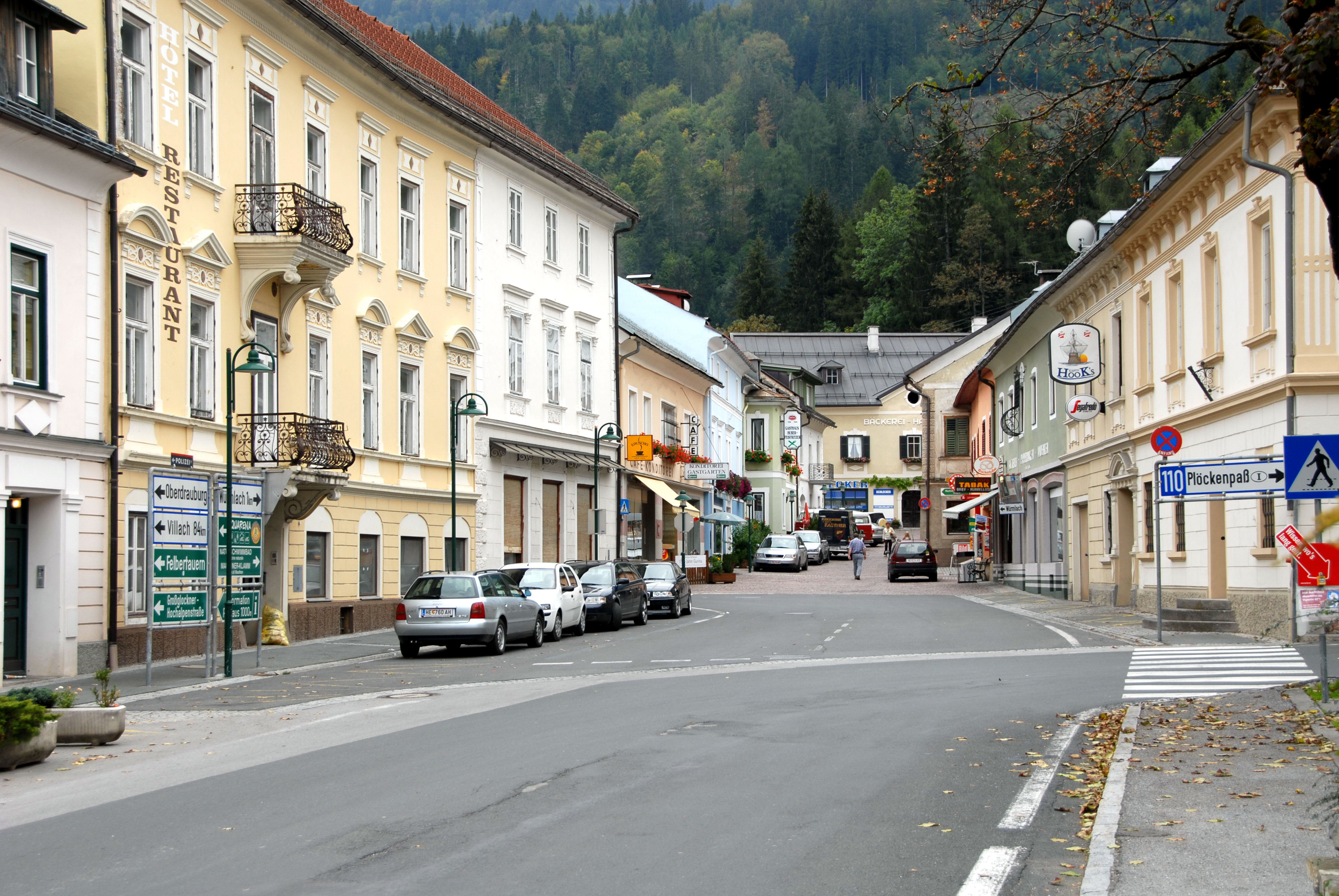
- Main street in Mauthen

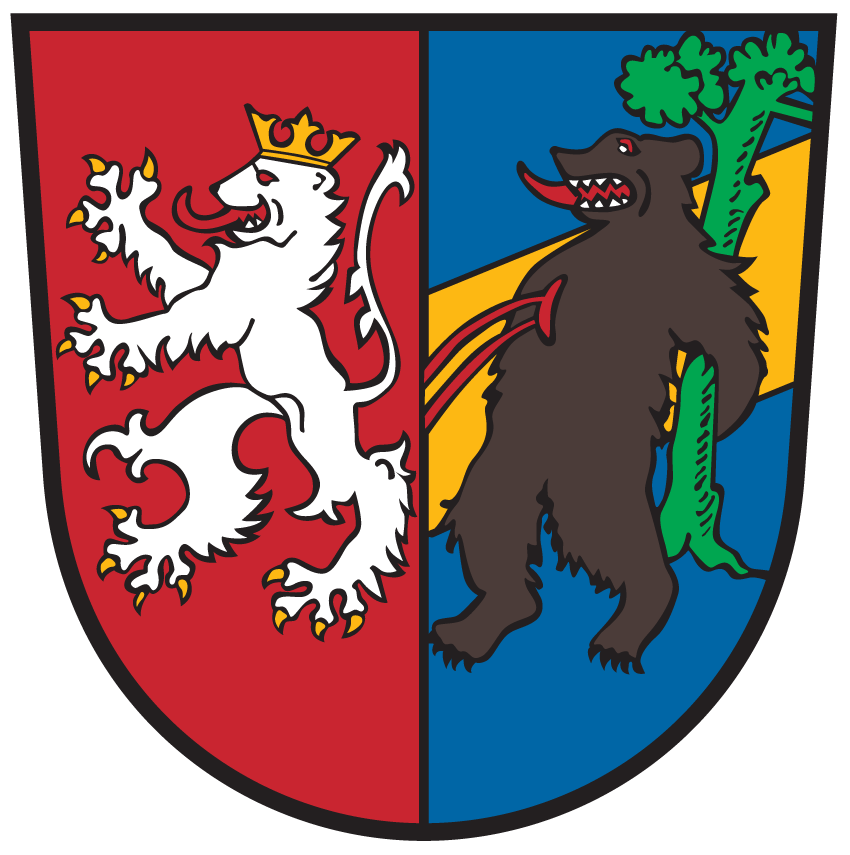
- Coat of arms

- Location within Austria
- Coordinates: 46°40′N 13°0′E
- Country: Austria
- State: Carinthia
- District: Hermagor

Government
  - Mayor: Josef Zoppoth (SPÖ)

Area
  - Total: 154.14 km^{2} (59.51 sq mi)
- Elevation: 705 m (2,313 ft)

Population (2018-01-01)
  - Total: 3,348
  - Density: 21.72/km^{2} (56.26/sq mi)
- Time zone: UTC+1 (CET)
  - Summer (DST): UTC+2 (CEST)
- Postal code: 9640
- Area code: 04715
- Website: www.koetschach-mauthen.at

Kötschach-Mauthen (Slovene: Koče - Muta) is a market town in the district of Hermagor in Carinthia in Austria.

== Geography ==
The municipality lies 34 km (21 mi) in the west of Hermagor at the transition of the upper Gail Valley into the Lesachtal, between the Gailtal and Carnic Alps. It is located at an important road junction: in the north, the highway leads up to Gailberg Saddle and the market town of Oberdrauburg, in the south to Plöcken Pass on the Carinthian border with the Carnian region of Friuli, Italy.

=== Municipality arrangement ===
Kötschach-Mauthen is divided into the four municipalities Kötschach (Koče), Mauthen (Muta), Strajach (Srejah), and Würmlach (Bumlje). It covers 31 localities (in parentheses number of inhabitants according to the 2001 population census):

- Aigen (17)
- Buchach (11)
- Dobra (6)
- Dolling (9)
- Gailberg (4)
- Gentschach (25)
- Gratzhof (12)
- Höfling (35)
- Kosta (11)
- Kötschach (1.612)
- Kreuth (82)
- Kreuzberg (15)
- Krieghof (5)
- Kronhof (14)
- Laas (231)
- Lanz (13)
- Mahlbach (11)
- Mandorf (34)
- Mauthen (760)
- Nischlwitz (13)
- Passau (3)
- Plöcken (0)
- Plon (15)
- Podlanig (37)
- Sankt Jakob im Lesachtal (83)
- Sittmoos (14)
- Strajach (96)
- Weidenburg (78)
- Wetzmann (24)
- Würda (0)
- Würmlach (343)

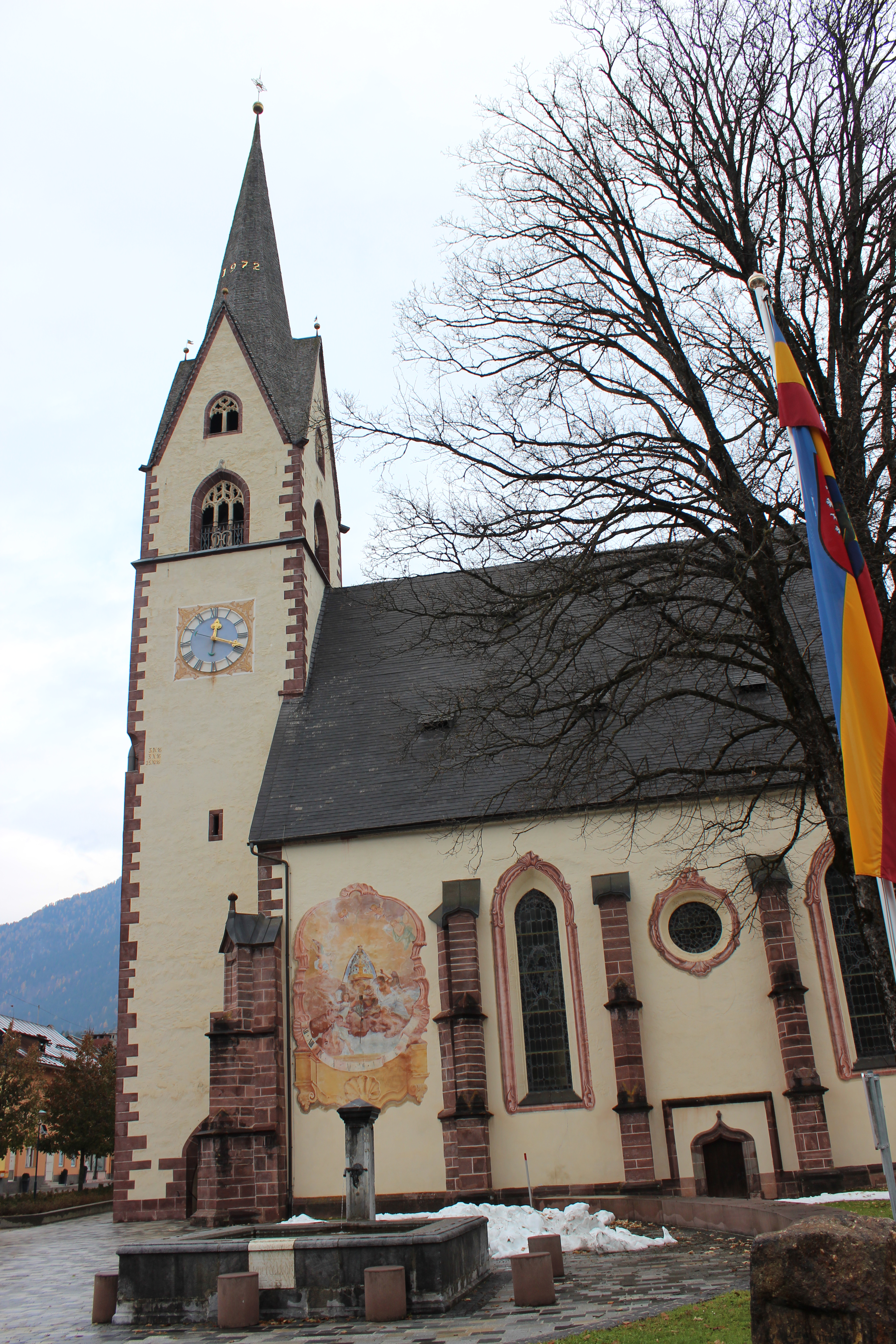
Kötschach parish church

=== Population ===
According to the 2001 population census Kötschach-Mauthen has 3.613 inhabitants. 95,0% of its inhabitants are Austrian, 1,2% German and 0,9% Turkish citizens. 89,1% of the population are Roman-Catholic, 6,6% Protestant and 1,3% are Muslim. 1,8% of the population are without any religious confession.

== History ==
The area in the Gail Valley was already settled around 200 BC. A Venetian rock inscription from this time still exists today in Würmlach. A Roman road ran over Plöcken Pass and led to the Noricum province, where a mansio named Loncium stood above present-day Mauthen (derived from German: Maut, "toll").

In the Middle Ages the remote region within the Duchy of Carinthia experienced economic growth due to the exploitation of iron ore, gold, silver and lead. Most of today's towns were already mentioned in the Middle Ages: Mauthen 1276, Höfling 1300, Kötschach 1308, Podlanig 1374, Würmlach 1374 and St. Jakob 1376. In the 16th century followed Laas 1510, Mandorf 1521, and Gentschach 1590. From 1319, Mauthen was the seat of a regional court. In the 15th century the area was held by the Counts of Ortenburg, who had a furnace erected, succeeded by several ironworks.

During World War I, the mountain crest of the Carnic Alps in the south was part of the Italian Front. On the occasion of the 10th anniversary of the Carinthian Plebiscite the town received market rights in 1930. Kötschach and Mauthen were merged into the municipality of Kötschach-Mauthen in 1958. In a 1973 administrative reform, extensive areas in the upper Gail Valley and in the lower Lesachtal area were added to the municipality.

== Sights ==
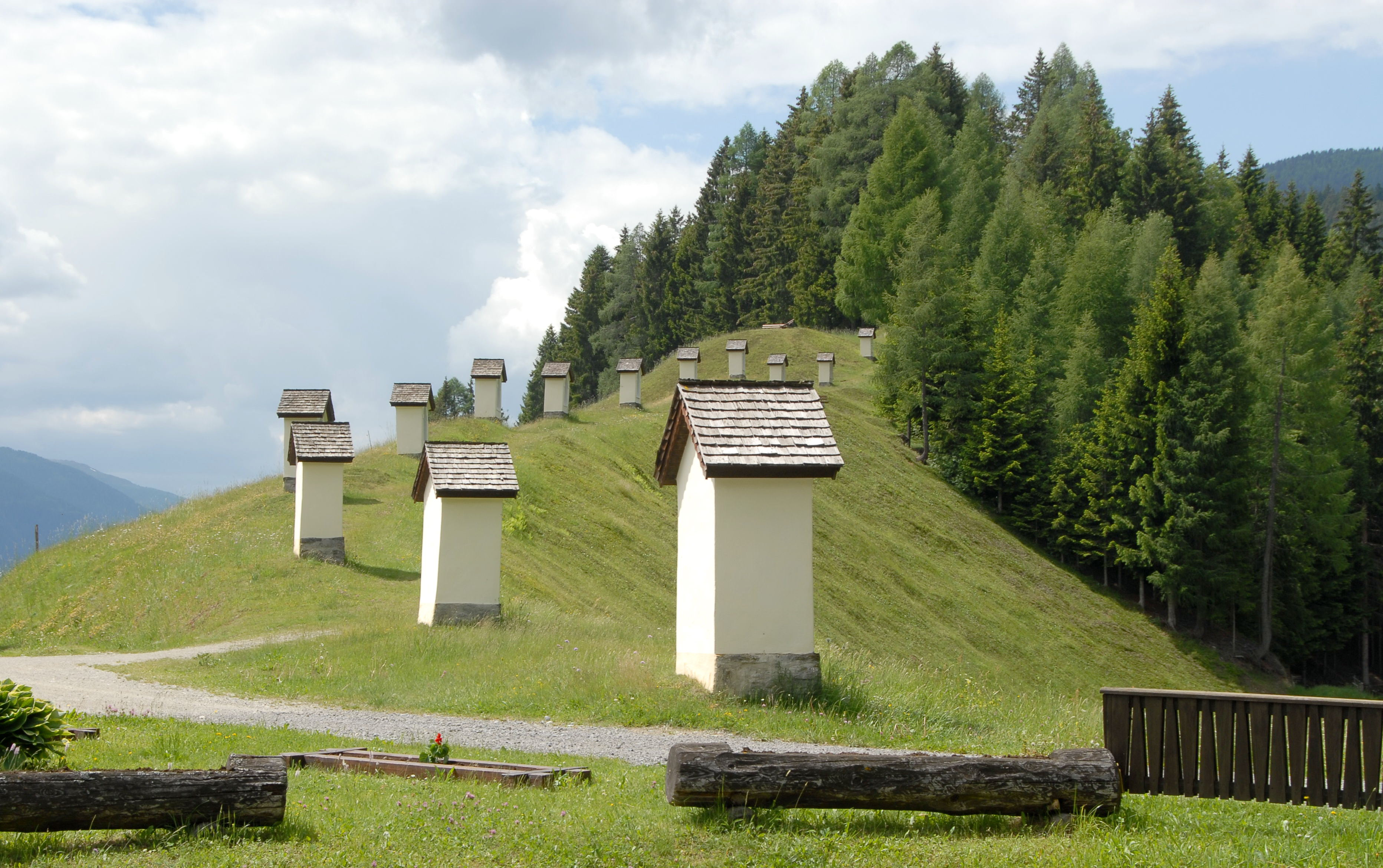
Way of the Cross near St. Jakob

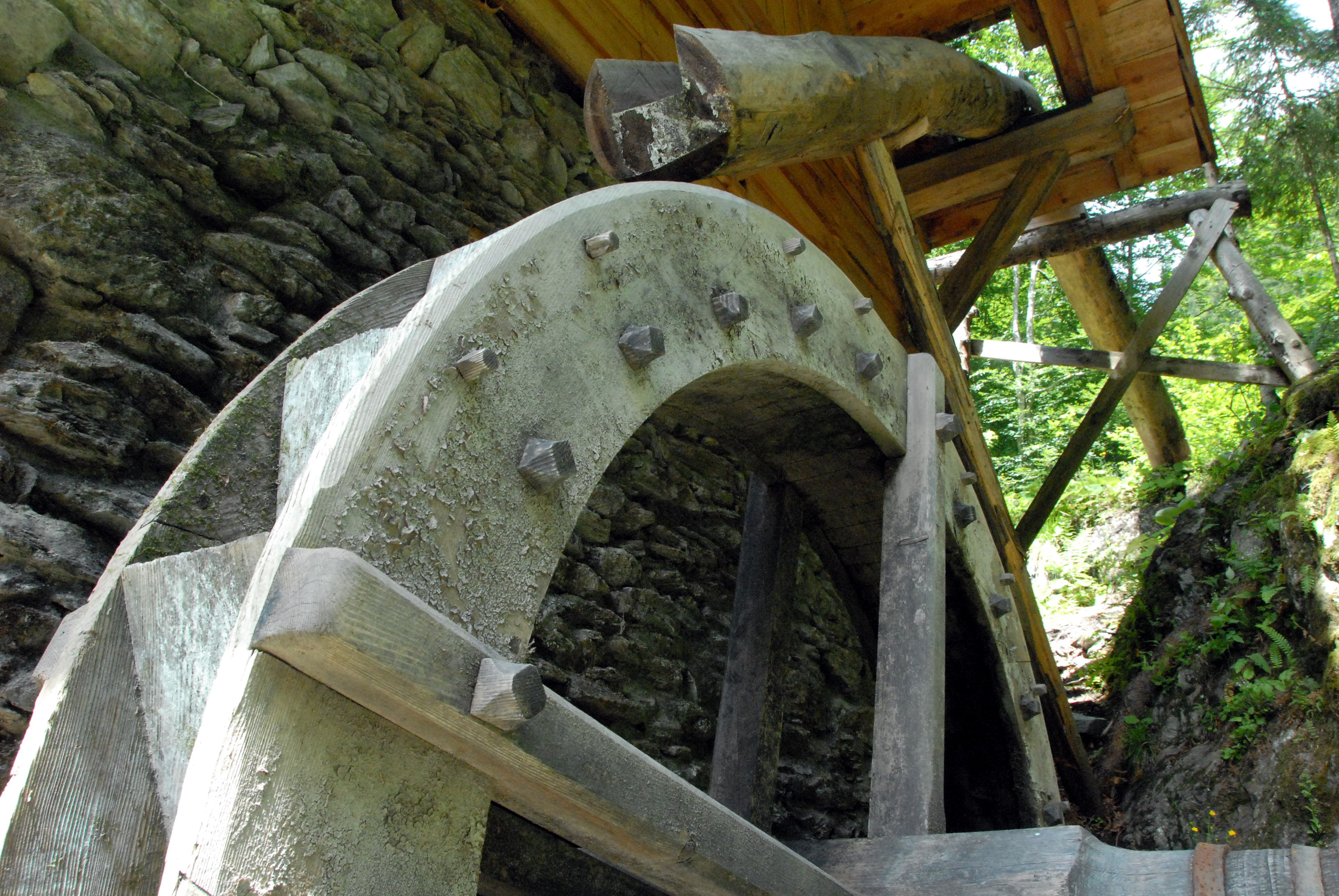
One of many Lesachtal water wheels

- Late Gothic parish church Our Lady (colloquially Gailtaler Dom, "Gailtal Cathedral") in Kötschach, first mentioned in 1399, rebuilt extensively from 1518 to 1527 according to plans designed by Bartholomäus Viertaler
- St Marcus Church in Mauthen, first mentioned in 1466
- World War I Museum 1915–18
- Ruins of Weidenburg Castle, first mentioned in 1225, later held by the Meinhardiner Counts of Gorizia and their Graben von Stein descendants, acquired by George Khevenhüller in 1571; the Khevenhüller family had a new castle erected beneath the ruins about 1615
- Ruined Pittersberg Castle, first mentioned in 1252, held by the Counts of Gorizia
- Late Gothic Mandorf Castle, erected by Ortenburg ministeriales first mentioned in 1521

== Economy and infrastructure ==
Kötschach-Mauthen is a central municipality in the upper Gailtal and at the same time a gate to the Lesachtal. Wood processing, the production of heat exchangers, tourism in general and gastronomy in particular are important economic factors of the region. Kötschach-Mauthen is well known as a wellness and climatic spa. The town boasts a modern outdoor and indoor swimming pool ("Aquarena"), which is the biggest in both Upper Gailtal and Lesachtal.

The National Hospital in nearby Laas consists of a medical department as well as a department for chronic patients.

In Würmlach the pipelines AWP, which goes to Schwechat near Vienna, and TAL, which leads to Karlsruhe in Germany, split up. Since 2005 gas is being pumped from Würmlach's biological gas facility to Kötschach into its combined heat and power station.

Passenger transport via train on the Hermagor-Kötschach-Mauthen section was discontinued at the end of 2016.

== Politics ==
Since the 2009 local elections the municipal assembly (Gemeinderat) consists of

- Social Democratic Party of Austria (SPÖ): 12 mandates
- Austrian People's Party (ÖVP): 5
- Freedom Party of Austria (FPÖ): 4
- Liste Thurner (Independent): 2

== Notable people ==
- Josef Klaus (1910–2001), politician, Chancellor of Austria from 1964 to 1970
