= Ingolstadt–Kralupy–Litvínov pipeline =

Crude oil pipeline in central Europe

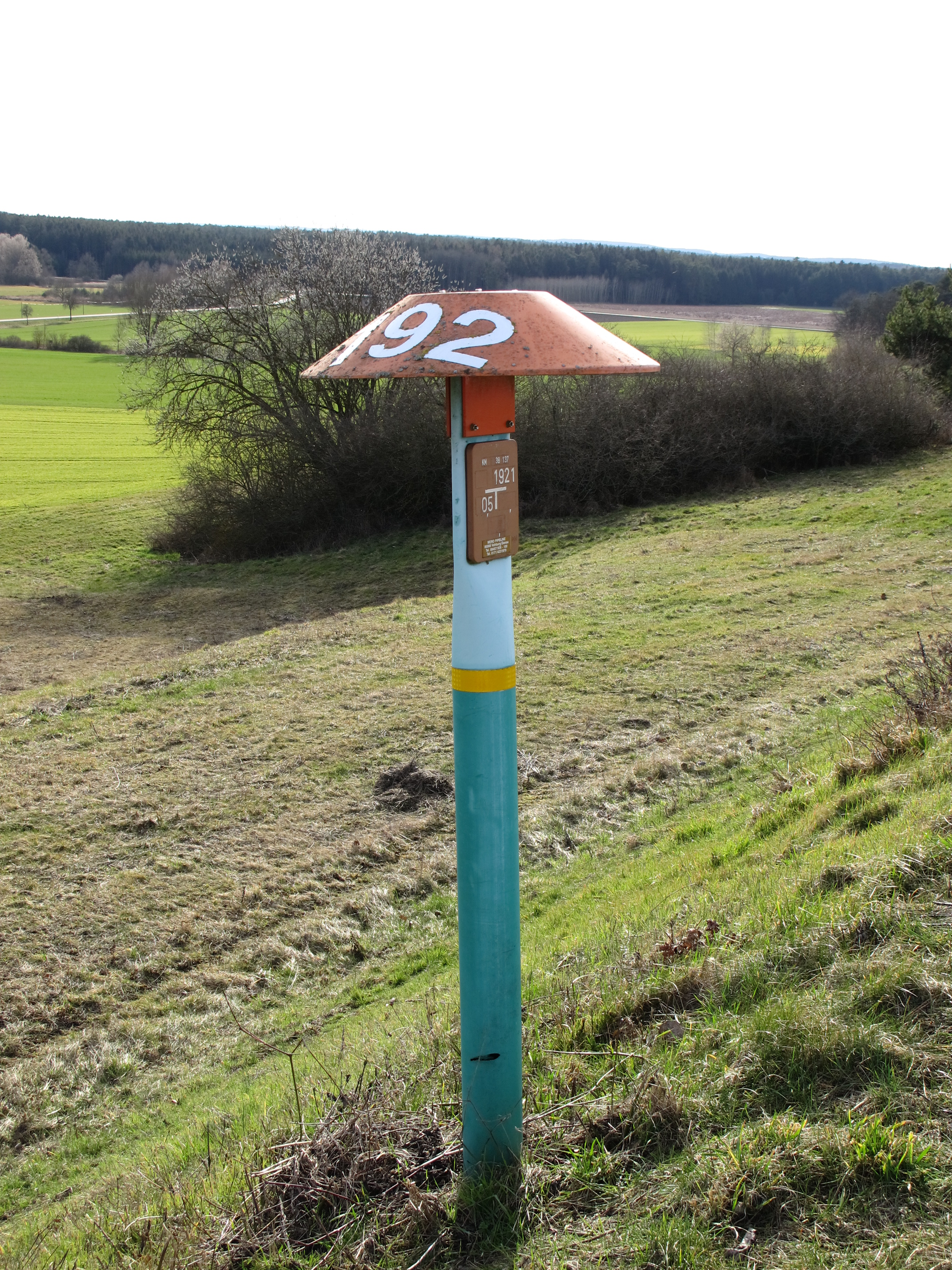
- Pipeline marker in Lower Bavaria

Location
- Country: Germany, Czech Republic
- Direction: west–east
- Start: Vohburg, the Transalpine Pipeline
- To: Nelahozeves

General information
- Type: oil
- Operator: MERO Pipeline GmbH
- Commissioned: 1996

Technical information
- Length: 347 km (216 mi)
- Maximum discharge: 10 million tonnes per year

The Ingolstadt–Kralupy–Litvínov pipeline (Czech: Ropovod Ingolstadt – Kralupy nad Vltavou – Litvínov) also known as IKL pipeline and MERO pipeline, is a crude oil pipeline in Central Europe. It facilitates the transport of crude oil from Germany to the Czech oil refineries of Kralupy and Litvínov. The name of the Ingolstadt–Kralupy–Litvínov pipeline is misleading, as the pipeline does not start in Ingolstadt and does not run to Kralupy and Litvínov.

== History ==
Negotiations to construct the Ingolstadt–Kralupy–Litvínov pipeline started in October 1990 and were concluded in 1992. Originally, the pipeline was planned to run from Ingolstadt to Litvínov, but the route was changed to run from Vohburg to Nelahozeves. However, the original name of the pipeline was kept.

Construction of the pipeline started on 1 September 1994 and was completed in December 2005. It was inaugurated on 13 March 1996. It is the main pipeline in the Czech Republic allowing oil supplies other than those of Russian origin. In 2003, the pipeline was modernized by improving remote control systems and increasing capacity.

== Route ==
The 347-kilometer (216 mi) pipeline starts from Vohburg in Germany, where it is connected with the Transalpine Pipeline, and ends at the oil depot in Nelahozeves near Prague in the Czech Republic. The German section of the pipeline is 178 kilometers (111 mi) and the Czech section is 169 kilometers (105 mi) long.

== Technical description ==
The pipeline has a diameter of 714 millimeters (28.1 in), and the pressure varies from 65 bars (6,500 kPa) in Vohburg to 20 bars (2,000 kPa) in Nelahozeves. The capacity of the pipeline is around ten million tonnes per year, of which normally 30% is in use. The additional capacity is reserved for securing oil supplies in case of disruption of Russian supplies through the Druzhba pipeline, as happened in July 2008, and longer periods in 2023 to 2025 during the Russia-Ukraine war. The control center, which controls the whole pipeline, is located in Vohburg. The backup control center is located in Nelahozeves.

The tank farm in Vohburg consists of four tanks, with a total capacity of 200,000 cubic meters (7,100,000 cu ft). The tank farm in Nelahozeves, serving the IKL and Druzhba pipelines, consists of sixteen tanks with a total capacity of 1,550,000 cubic meters (55,000,000 cu ft).

== Operating company ==
The pipeline is operated by MERO Pipeline GmbH.

== See also ==
- Energy in the Czech Republic
