= Česká rafinérská =

Česká rafinérská a.s.
- Company type: Private
- Industry: refining
- Founded: 28 April 1995
- Defunct: 1 January 2017
- Headquarters: Litvínov, Czech Republic
- Key people: Leszek J. Stoklosa (CEO)
- Revenue: ▲$593 million USD
- Number of employees: 629 (XII/2012)

Česká rafinérská a.s. was the largest Czech oil refining company and the largest producer of oil products in the country. The company operated two refineries located in Litvínov and Kralupy nad Vltavou with a combined capacity of 175,000 bbl/d (27,800 m^{3}/d). It was shared company of the Unipetrol, ENI and Shell (originally included one more owner, Conaco Philips). After the privatization of the Unipetrol (sold to the ORLEN Group), Shell and Conaco sold their portions and subsequently the ENI as well, finally Unipetrol was the sole owner of this company.

The Litvinov refinery is designed to process 5.8 million tonne-per-year of Russian crude oil whereas the Kralupy refinery processes up to 3.3 million tonne-per year of oil from other sources.

The Litvinov refinery can be modified to process non-Russian grade oil which is currently received through the Druzhba pipeline.

== See also ==
- Energy in the Czech Republic
