= Kostelany =

- Municipality
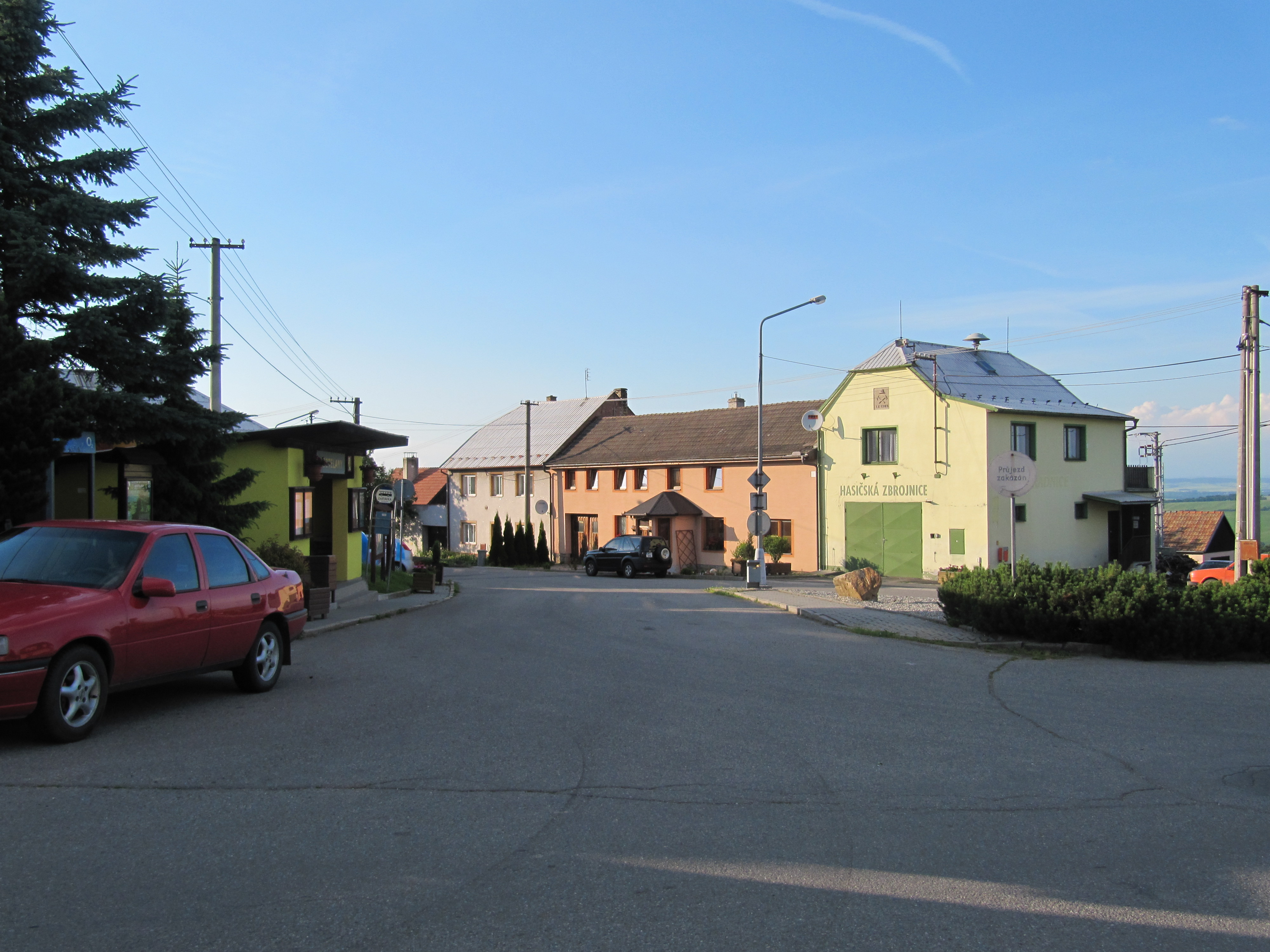
- Centre of Kostelany

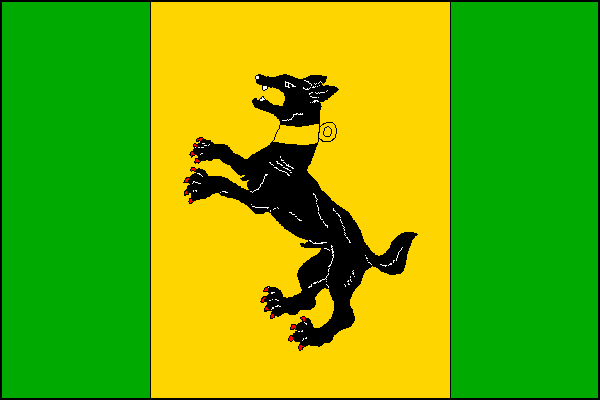
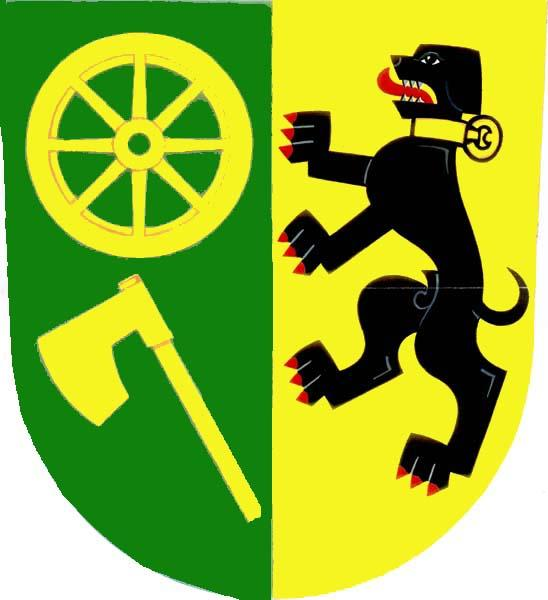
- Flag Coat of arms

- Location in the Czech Republic
- Coordinates: 49°12′11″N 17°22′58″E
- Country: Czech Republic
- Region: Zlín
- District: Kroměříž
- First mentioned: 1667

Area
  - Total: 13.29 km^{2} (5.13 sq mi)
- Elevation: 365 m (1,198 ft)

Population (2026-01-01)
  - Total: 630
  - Density: 47/km^{2} (120/sq mi)
- Time zone: UTC+1 (CET)
  - Summer (DST): UTC+2 (CEST)
- Postal code: 767 01
- Website: www.obeckostelany.cz

Kostelany is a municipality and village in Kroměříž District in the Zlín Region of the Czech Republic. It has about 600 inhabitants.

Kostelany lies approximately 11 kilometres (7 mi) south of Kroměříž, 22 km (14 mi) west of Zlín, and 235 km (146 mi) south-east of Prague.

== Administrative division ==
Kostelany consists of three municipal parts (in brackets population according to the 2021 census):

- Kostelany (422)
- Lhotka (77)
- Újezdsko (111)

== Demographics ==
Historical population
Year	Pop.	±%
1869	789	—
1880	888	+12.5%
1890	917	+3.3%
1900	946	+3.2%
1910	983	+3.9%
1921	983	+0.0%
1930	925	−5.9%
1950	791	−14.5%
1961	933	+18.0%
1970	777	−16.7%
1980	600	−22.8%
1991	491	−18.2%
2001	505	+2.9%
2011	543	+7.5%
2021	610	+12.3%
Source: Censuses
