= Spolana =

Chemical factory in Neratovice, Czech Republic

Coordinates: 50°16′10.63″N 14°30′50.04″E

SPOLANA s.r.o.

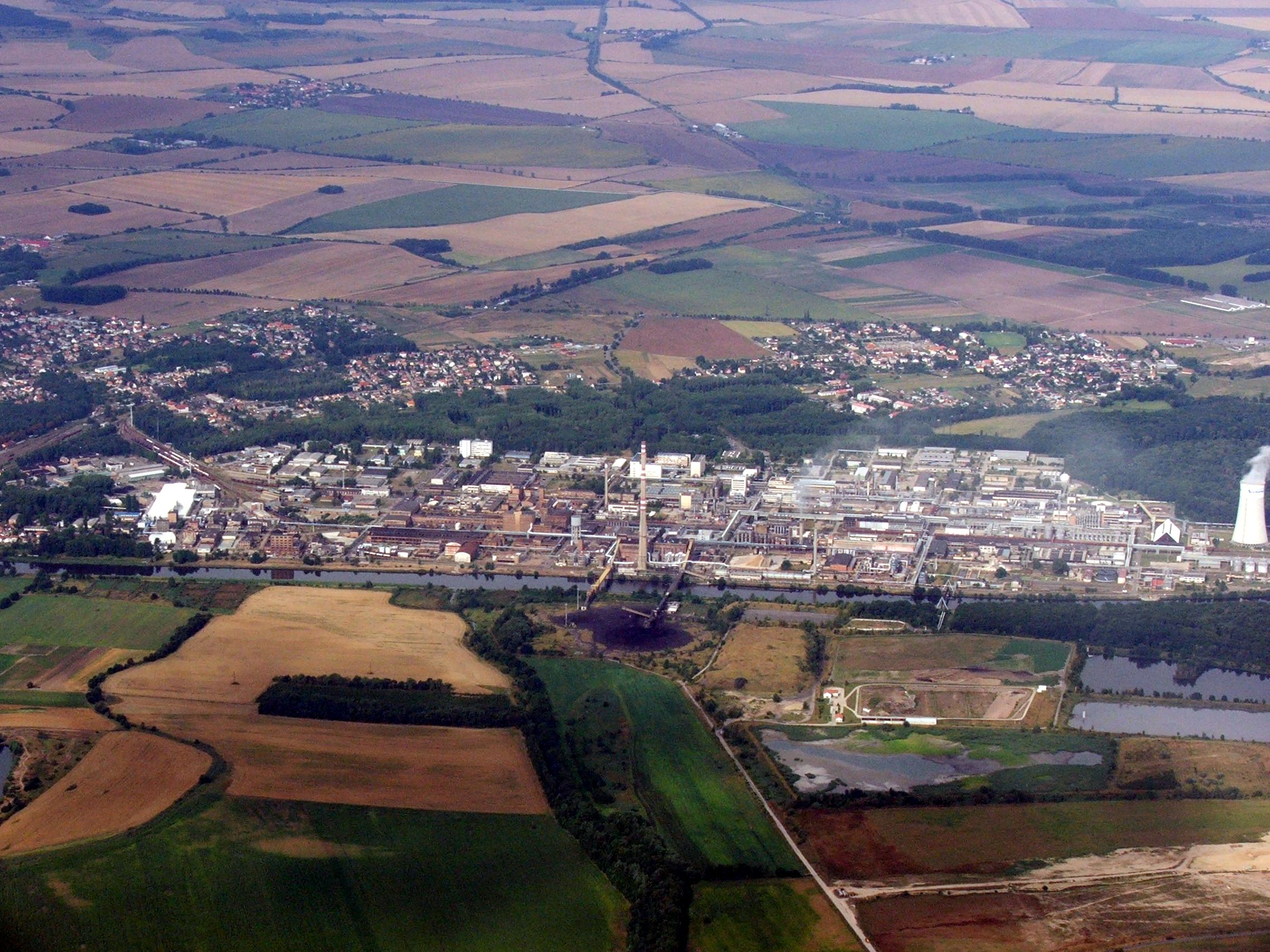
- Aerial view of Spolana Neratovice
- Industry: Chemicals
- Founded: 1992
- Headquarters: Neratovice, Czech Republic
- Products: Anorganics, granulates, PVC
- Revenue: 433,5 mil. CZK (2017)
- Net income: 204,000,000 Czech koruna (1994)
- Total assets: 1,3 bil. CZK (2018)
- Number of employees: 4,203 (1993)
- Parent: ORLEN Unipetrol RPA
- Website: spolana.cz

SPOLANA s.r.o. is a chemical factory located on the Elbe riverbank in Neratovice, Czech Republic. It is oriented mainly towards exporting its products, and exports represent more than 80% of its total production. It currently concentrates on the production of PVC, fertilisers, technical gases, and other inorganic and chemical products. It employs more than 700 people. Since 2016, Spolana has been part of the Unipetrol group.

== History ==
In 1898, V. B. Goldberg founded a factory manufacturing soaps, candles and oils in Neratovice, and in 1905, František Šebor’s plant manufacturing various chemical agents was developed here. The decisive influence on the town’s development, the water reservoir connect to the nearby Elbe, meant the gradual expansion of chemical production. In 1908-1915, a smaller of ammoniac and fertilisers production plant was based here, and later on (between the World Wars), the complex changed to a production plant and warehouses for food stuffs (sweets, chocolate, rolled pickled herrings, fish salads, mustard, soup spice, marmalade, and chicory). After the German occupation of the borderland in 1939, it was purchased by Spolek pro chemickou a hutní výrobu (Association for chemical and metallurgical production), which started expansion of the factory. The basis for this was the production of pure chemicals, agents for agricultural pest control, and car paints, finishes, and waxes. After that, the Association started developing a chemical complex including electrolysis for chlorine and caustic soda production, and a plant for the production of viscose staple fibres. As part of the expansion, a coal-burning plant for steam production, a water purification station and a hydroelectric power plant on the Elbe were built by the end of 1946.

In 1945, the Association, including its plant in Neratovice, was nationalised. In 1950, the company disaffiliated under the name Spolana. Over time, additional chemical plants in Křinec, Kralupy nad Vltavou (Reagencie) were incorporated into Spolana. In the mid-1960s, the production of laboratory chemicals was separated off into a new company, Lachema Neratovice. All of the on-going operations were modernised and extended: a new plant producing sulphuric acid from pyrite, a glue plant processing keratin, and a wastewater treatment plant were built.

Later on, a caprolactam production plant was developed, and the branch plant in Velvary was extended. This development culminated in 1970 to 1976, when new units for the production of chlorine by electrolysis (from imported salt), sulphuric acid and polyvinylchloride (PVC) were built. After 1970, older production units were closed, e.g. those undertaking glue production and old chlorine electrolysis. A dominant 200-metre (660 ft) chimney and a 100-metre (330 ft) high cooling tower were built. The power units were redeveloped, staple production was modernised, and an Oestrophan plant was built.

From the end of 2001 to November 2006, Spolana was part of the holding group Unipetrol, which became part of the Polish concern PKN Orlen in May 2005. In November 2006, Unipetrol sold its business share in Spolana to the Polish company ANWIL SA, which is also part of the PKN Orlen concern. In June 2016, Spolana was sold back to the UNIPETROL group.

== The present ==
In 2016, UNIPETROL RPA signed a purchase agreement with ANWIL, based on which it acquired a 100% share in Spolana. In recent years, other investments into the modernisation of the plant and product portfolio extension have been realised. At the beginning of 2018, Spolana released a new granulated form of the agricultural fertiliser, ammonium sulphate. In the same year, it started developing a new gas heating plant producing steam for the complex operation. The new heating plant will be fitted with two natural-gas steam boilers with a capacity of 2 x 35 tons of steam per hour. They will replace the existing brown-coal boilers. The completion of this project is scheduled for 2019. The total investment will amount to 200 million CZK.

== Spolana's Directors ==
- 1945–1946 – Dr. Ing. Hynek Majtl
- 1946–1949 – Ing. Bedřich Makarius
- 1949–1952 – Dr. Vladimír Šváb
- 1952–1955 – Ing. Dr. Jan Kmuníček
- 1955–1958 – Jan Boháček
- 1958–1966 – Antonín Podzimek
- 1966–1986 – Dr. Karel Ježek, CSc.
- 1986–1987 – Ing. Milan Eichler
- 1988–1989 – Ing. Alexander Pálffy, CSc.
- 1990–1990 – Ing. Jiří Brynda
- 1990–1994 – Ing. Zdeněk Votava
- 1994–1996 – Ing. Přemek Hlavnička
- 1996–2002 – Ing. Jaroslav Štrop
- 2002–2002 – Ing. Radomír Věk
- 2002–2007 – Ing. Miroslav Kuliha
- 2007–2011 – Ing. Petr Lipták
- 2012–2013 – Dr. Ing. Ivan Oliva
- 2013–2017 – Karel Pavlíček
- 2018 – Jacek Aliński
- 2018–now – Krzysztof Bączyk
