= Transalpine Pipeline =

Oil pipeline between Italy, Austria, Germany and the Czech Republic

Coordinates: 48.76782°N 11.58897°E

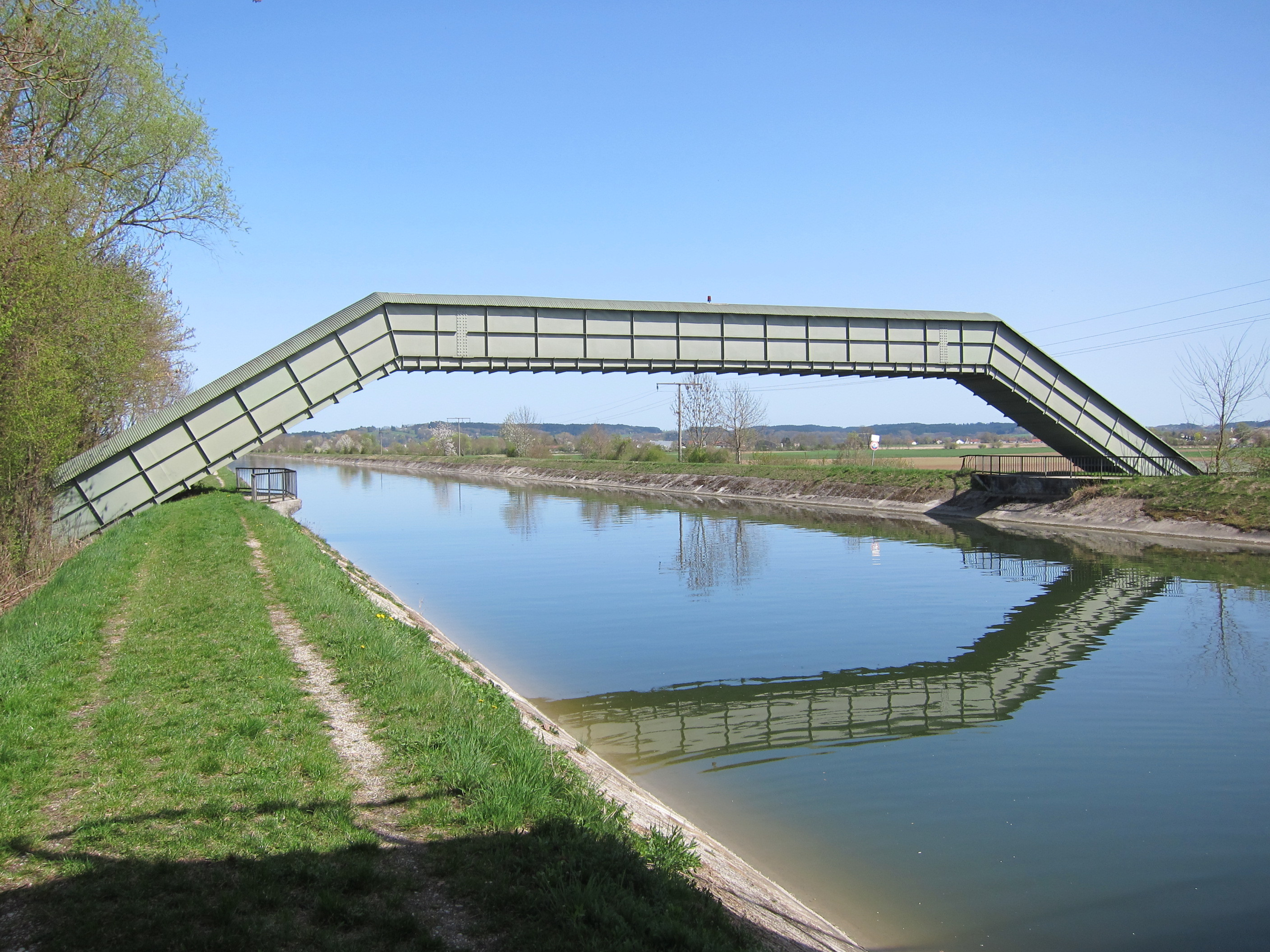
- Location of Transalpine Pipeline

Location
- Country: Italy, Austria, Germany
- Start: Trieste
- Passes through: Würmlach, Vohburg, Ingolstadt,
- To: Neustadt an der Donau, Karlsruhe

General information
- Type: oil
- Partners: OMV, Royal Dutch Shell, ExxonMobil, Ruhr Oel, Eni, BP, ConocoPhillips, Total S.A.
- Operator: The Transalpine Pipeline Company
- Commissioned: 1967

Technical information
- Length: 752 km (467 mi)
- Maximum discharge: 43 million tons per year

The Transalpine Pipeline (TAL) is a crude oil pipeline, which connects Italy, Austria, Germany and the Czech Republic.

== History ==
The feasibility study of the pipeline was carried out by Bechtel in 1963. The pipeline was commissioned in 1967. This time, the construction cost around US$192 million.

In 1972, the pipeline was the target of a Palestine terrorist attack.

In May 2023 the Czech company MERO ČR announced a $73 million expansion to the Transalpine Pipeline that would double capacity to 8 million tons of oil to the Czech Republic, requiring 20 additional pumps and the upgrade of other equipment to pump the oil to 1,500m above sea level, over the alps, with completion scheduled for the end of 2024. The object being to make the Czech Republic independent of Russian oil.

== Route ==
The pipeline starts from the marine terminal in Trieste. From Trieste, the pipeline runs 465 kilometres (289 mi) through the Alps to Ingolstadt. From Ingolstadt one 21-kilometre-long (13 mi) pipeline runs to Neustadt an der Donau and another 266-kilometre-long (165 mi) pipeline runs to Karlsruhe. In Vohburg, the Transalpine Pipeline is connected with the Ingolstadt-Kralupy-Litvínov pipeline, which supplies oil refineries in the Czech Republic. It could be used to reverse the southern branch of the Druzhba pipeline to supply Slovakia.

In Würmlach, Austria, the Adria-Wien Pipeline (AWP) branches off from the Transalpine Pipeline. It supplies the OMV refinery in Schwechat. Through the proposed Bratislava - Schwechat Pipeline it may supply also Slovakia.

In addition to the sea transport, the Pan-European Pipeline, if constructed, will supply the Transalpine Pipeline.

== Technical features ==
The diameter of the trunkline between Trieste and Ingolstadt is 40 inches (1,020 mm). Both sections starting from Ingolstadt are with 26 inches (660 mm) in diameter. The pipeline has ten pumping stations. The pipeline system includes tank farms in Trieste and Lenting, Germany. The capacity of the pipeline is approximately 43 million tons of crude oil per year. In 2012 the throughput of the pipeline was 34.9 million tons of crude oil.

== Pipeline company ==
The pipeline is owned by the consortium of eight oil companies. The current shareholders are:

- OMV (25%)
- Shell Plc (24%)
- ExxonMobil (16%)
- Ruhr Oel (11%)
- Eni (10%)
- BP (9%)
- ConocoPhillips (3%)
- Total S.A. (2%)

The Czech unit of PKN Orlen, Unipetrol, is negotiating to buy an about 2% in the pipeline.

The shareholders of the Group include: OMV, Shell, Rosneft, ENI, C-BLUE B.V. (Gunvor), ExxonMobil, Mero, Phillips 66/Jet Tankstellen and Total.

== See also ==
- South European Pipeline
