= Uhřice (Hodonín District) =

- Municipality
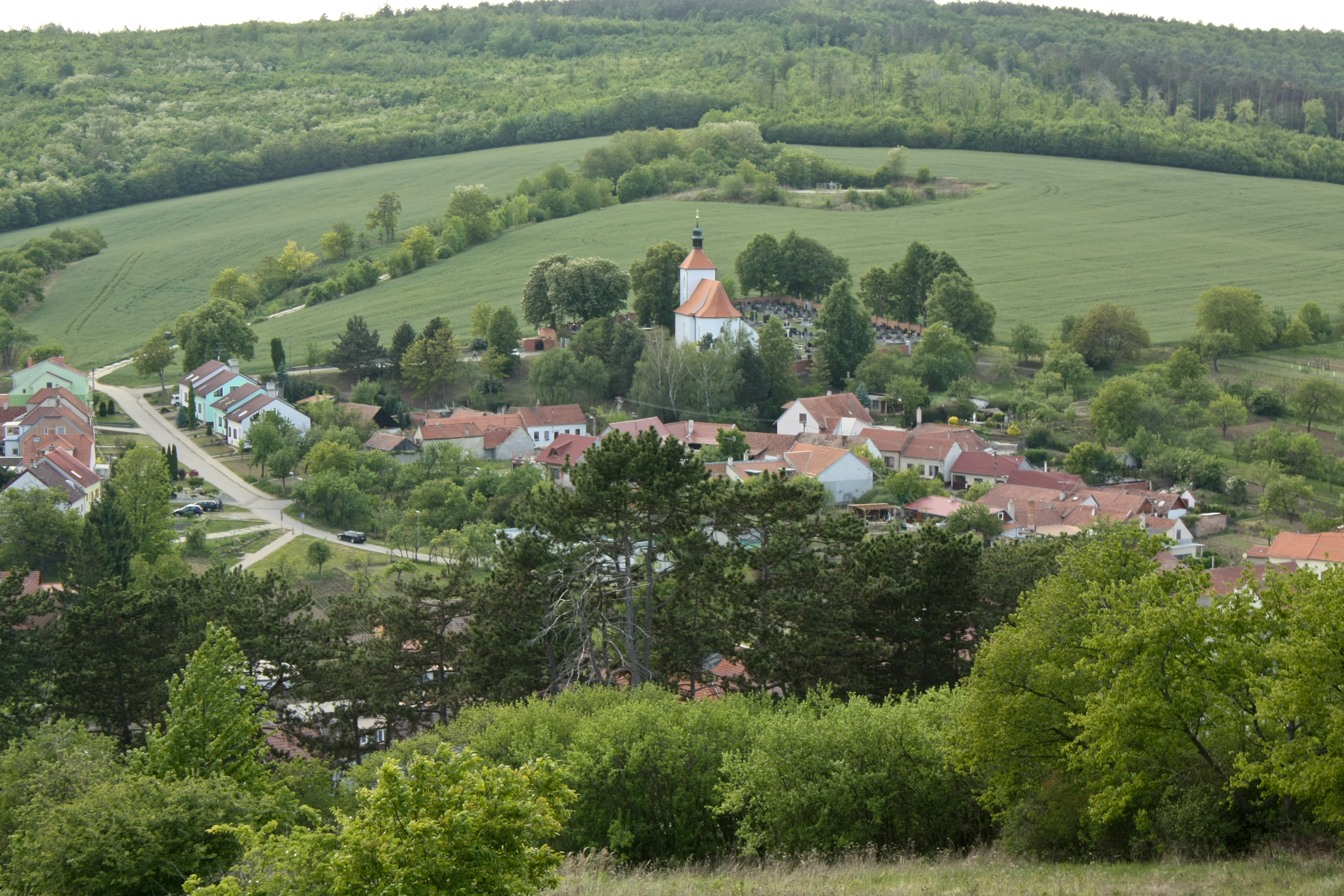
- General view

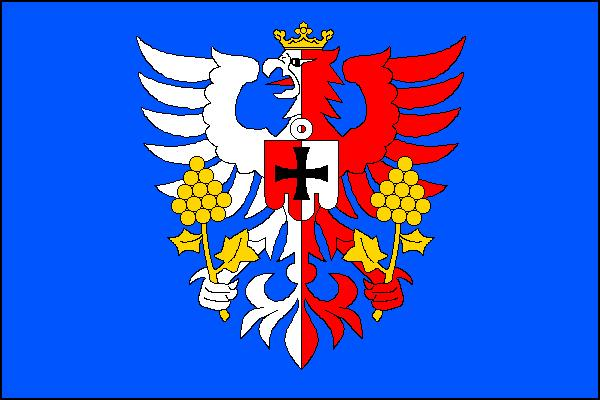
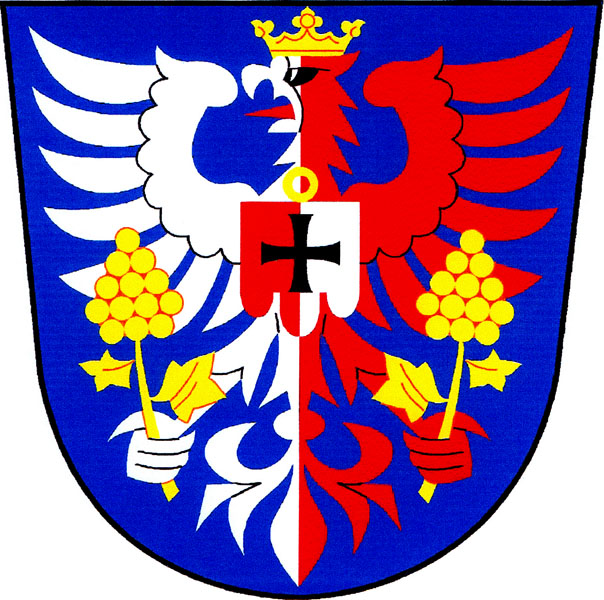
- Flag Coat of arms

- Location in the Czech Republic
- Coordinates: 49°3′1″N 16°56′51″E
- Country: Czech Republic
- Region: South Moravian
- District: Hodonín
- First mentioned: 1196

Area
  - Total: 7.11 km^{2} (2.75 sq mi)
- Elevation: 227 m (745 ft)

Population (2026-01-01)
  - Total: 769
  - Density: 108/km^{2} (280/sq mi)
- Time zone: UTC+1 (CET)
  - Summer (DST): UTC+2 (CEST)
- Postal code: 696 34
- Website: www.obec-uhrice.cz

Uhřice is a municipality and village in Hodonín District in the South Moravian Region of the Czech Republic. It has about 800 inhabitants.

Uhřice lies approximately 26 kilometres (16 mi) north-west of Hodonín, 31 km (19 mi) south-east of Brno, and 217 km (135 mi) south-east of Prague.

== Demographics ==
Historical population
Year	Pop.	±%
1869	746	—
1880	850	+13.9%
1890	831	−2.2%
1900	929	+11.8%
1910	1,000	+7.6%
1921	1,001	+0.1%
1930	936	−6.5%
1950	863	−7.8%
1961	925	+7.2%
1970	813	−12.1%
1980	780	−4.1%
1991	732	−6.2%
2001	719	−1.8%
2011	700	−2.6%
2021	736	+5.1%
Source: Censuses
