= Neratovice =

- Town
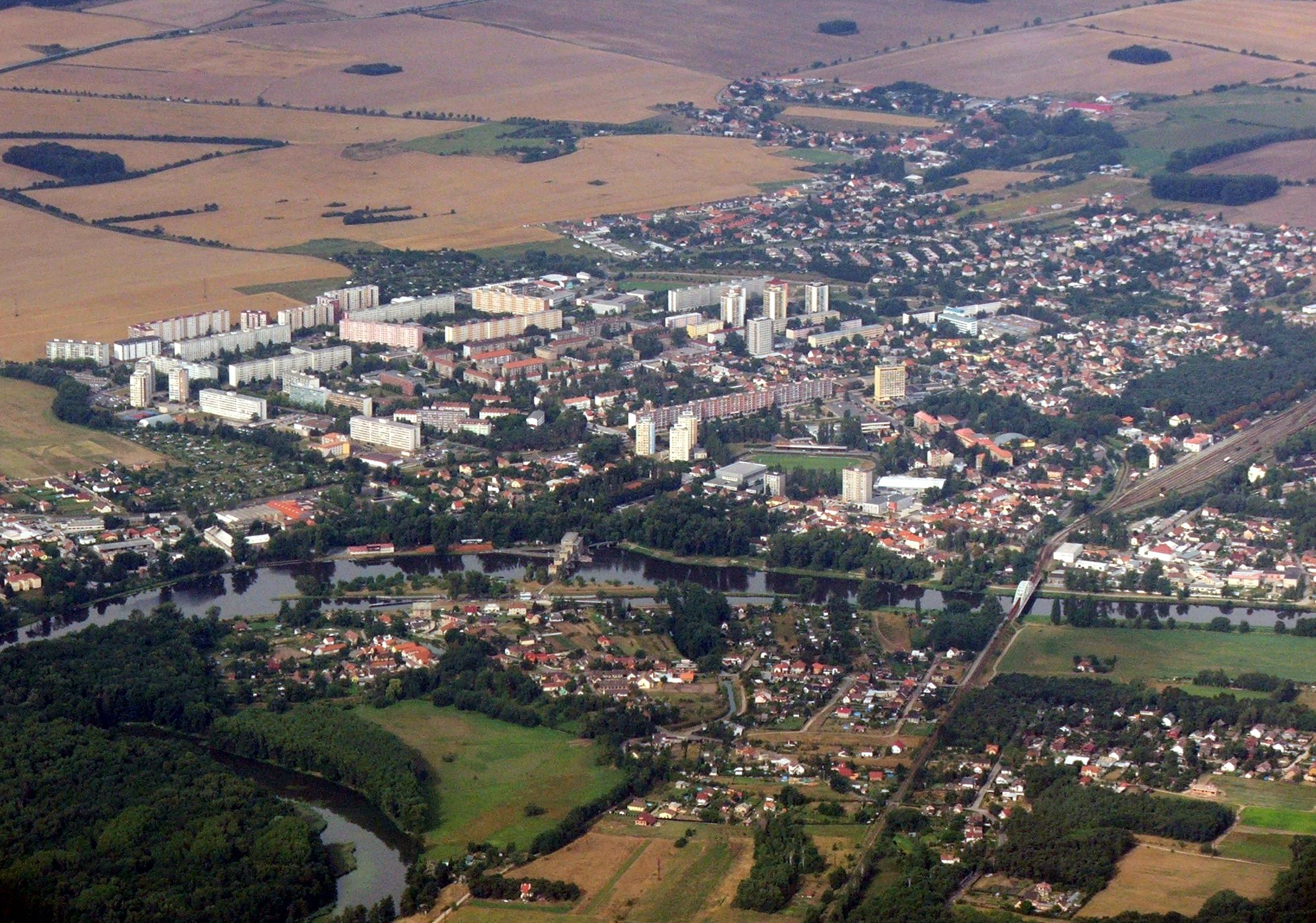
- Aerial view

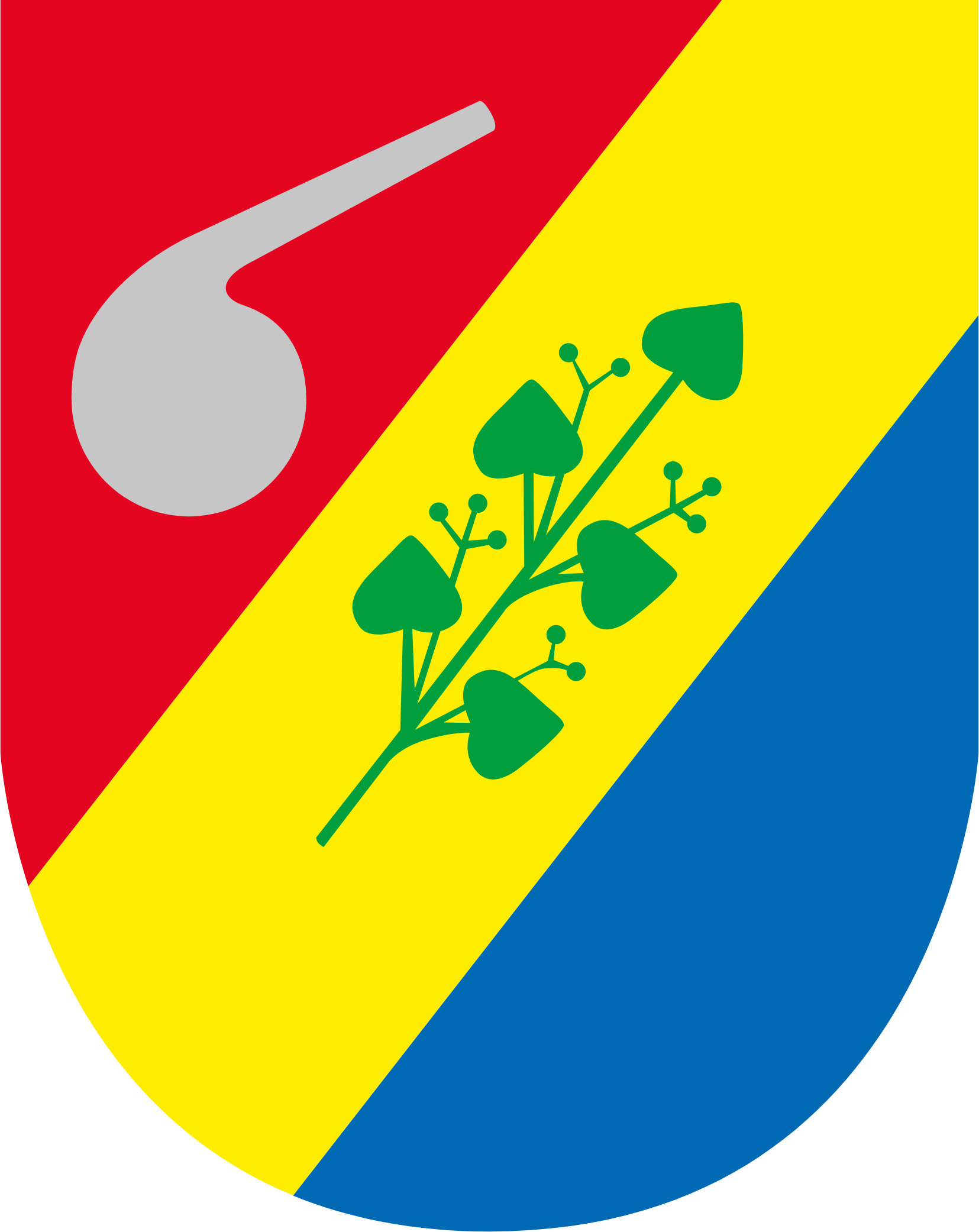
- Flag Coat of arms

- Location in the Czech Republic
- Coordinates: 50°15′34″N 14°31′4″E
- Country: Czech Republic
- Region: Central Bohemian
- District: Mělník
- First mentioned: 1227

Government
  - Mayor: Roman Kroužecký

Area
  - Total: 20.00 km^{2} (7.72 sq mi)
- Elevation: 162 m (531 ft)

Population (2026-01-01)
  - Total: 16,279
  - Density: 813.9/km^{2} (2,108/sq mi)
- Time zone: UTC+1 (CET)
  - Summer (DST): UTC+2 (CEST)
- Postal code: 277 11
- Website: www.neratovice.cz

Neratovice (Czech pronunciation: [ˈnɛratovɪtsɛ]; German: Neratowitz) is a town in Mělník District in the Central Bohemian Region of the Czech Republic. It has about 16,000 inhabitants. The town is located on the Elbe River in the Central Elbe Table. Neratovice is an industrial town, known especially for the Spolana chemical plant.

== Administrative division ==
Neratovice consists of six municipal parts (in brackets population according to the 2021 census):

- Neratovice (13,715)
- Byškovice (382)
- Horňátky (38)
- Korycany (298)
- Lobkovice (813)
- Mlékojedy (620)

== Etymology ==
The settlement was originally named Neradice. The name was derived from the personal name Nerad, meaning "the village of Nerad's people". At the turn of the 14th and 15th centuries, it was distorted to Neratovice.

== Geography ==
Neratovice is located about 17 kilometres (11 mi) north of Prague. It lies in a flat landscape in the Central Elbe Table. The highest point is at 284 m (932 ft) above sea level. The Elbe River flows through the town. The stream Košátecký potok flows into the Elbe on the northern border of Neratovice. A notable body of water is the flooded sandstone quarry Mlékojedy.

== History ==
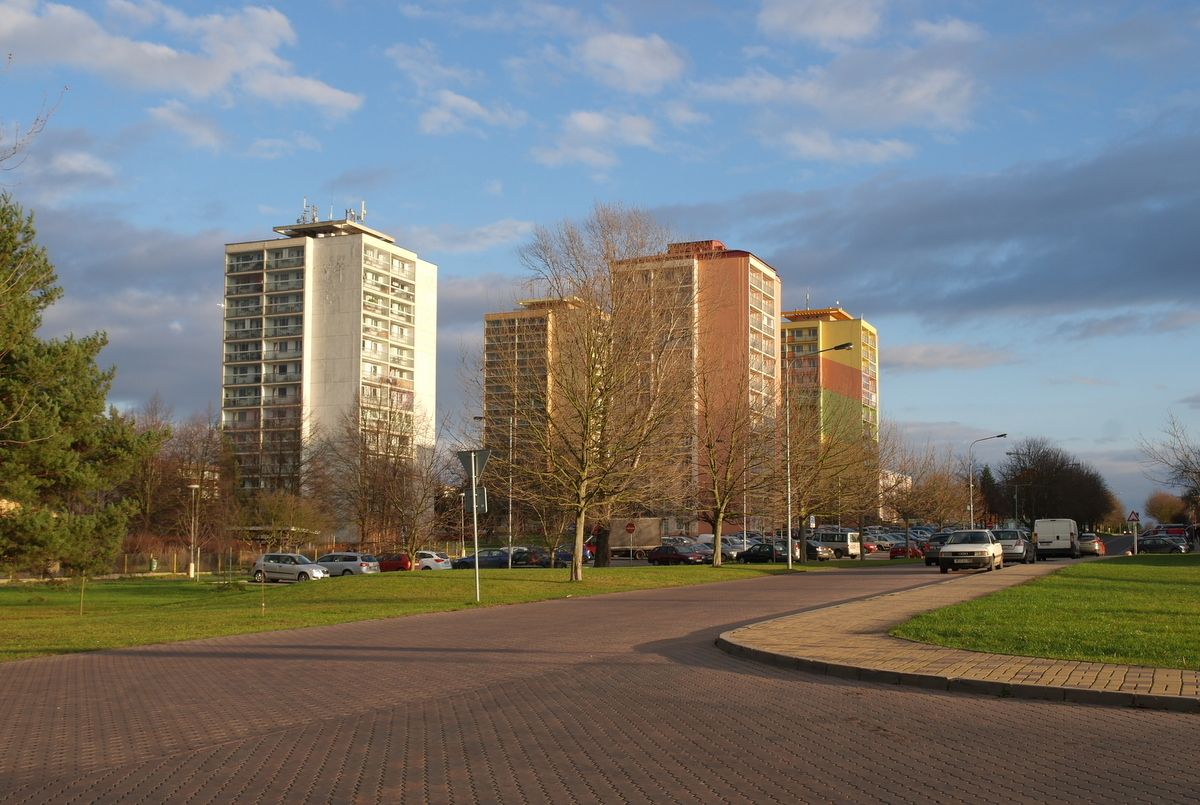
Dr. E. Beneše street

The first written mention of Neratovice is from 1227, at that time known as Neradice. It was a serf village of Chapter of St. Wenceslaus at the Prague Castle and of St. George's Convent in Prague. In the second half of the 14th century, it became a property of the Archbishopric of Prague. At the beginning of the 15th century, Neratovice was purchased by the Lobkowicz family and remained their owners for most of the time in the following centuries.

Thanks to the industrial revolution, Neratovice developed significantly in the second half of the 19th century. In 1865, the first train passed through the village along the Turnov–Kralupy line. In 1872, a line from Prague connected to it and a railway station was built. In 1874, a post office was established in Neratovice. In 1880, Neratovice separated from Lobkovice and became an independent municipality. In 1898, the railway to Brandýs nad Labem was put into operation. In 1900, a factory for the production of oil, degrass, soap and candles (later known as Lachema) was established. In 1905, a chemical factory focused especially on ammonia production (later known as Spolana) was established. Villas were built and the Neratovice region became a recreational area, especially for the inhabitants of Prague.

In 1950, an independent national enterprise Spolana Neratovice was established. In 1957, Neratovice officially became a town and the villages of Libiš, Byškovice, Lobkovice, Horňátky, Mlékojedy and Korycany were gradually associated with them. In cooperation with Spolana, a new "modern" panel-type town with abundant social facilities was intensively built. The population grew up as people were coming to Neratovice for work and housing. In 1990, Libiš became an independent municipality again.

== Demographics ==
Historical population

Year	Pop.	±%
1869	1,517	—
1880	1,789	+17.9%
1890	1,974	+10.3%
1900	2,205	+11.7%
1910	2,698	+22.4%

Year	Pop.	±%
1921	2,880	+6.7%
1930	4,183	+45.2%
1950	5,267	+25.9%
1961	7,719	+46.6%
1970	8,982	+16.4%

Year	Pop.	±%
1980	15,025	+67.3%
1991	15,685	+4.4%
2001	16,318	+4.0%
2011	16,426	+0.7%
2021	15,866	−3.4%

Source: Censuses

== Economy ==
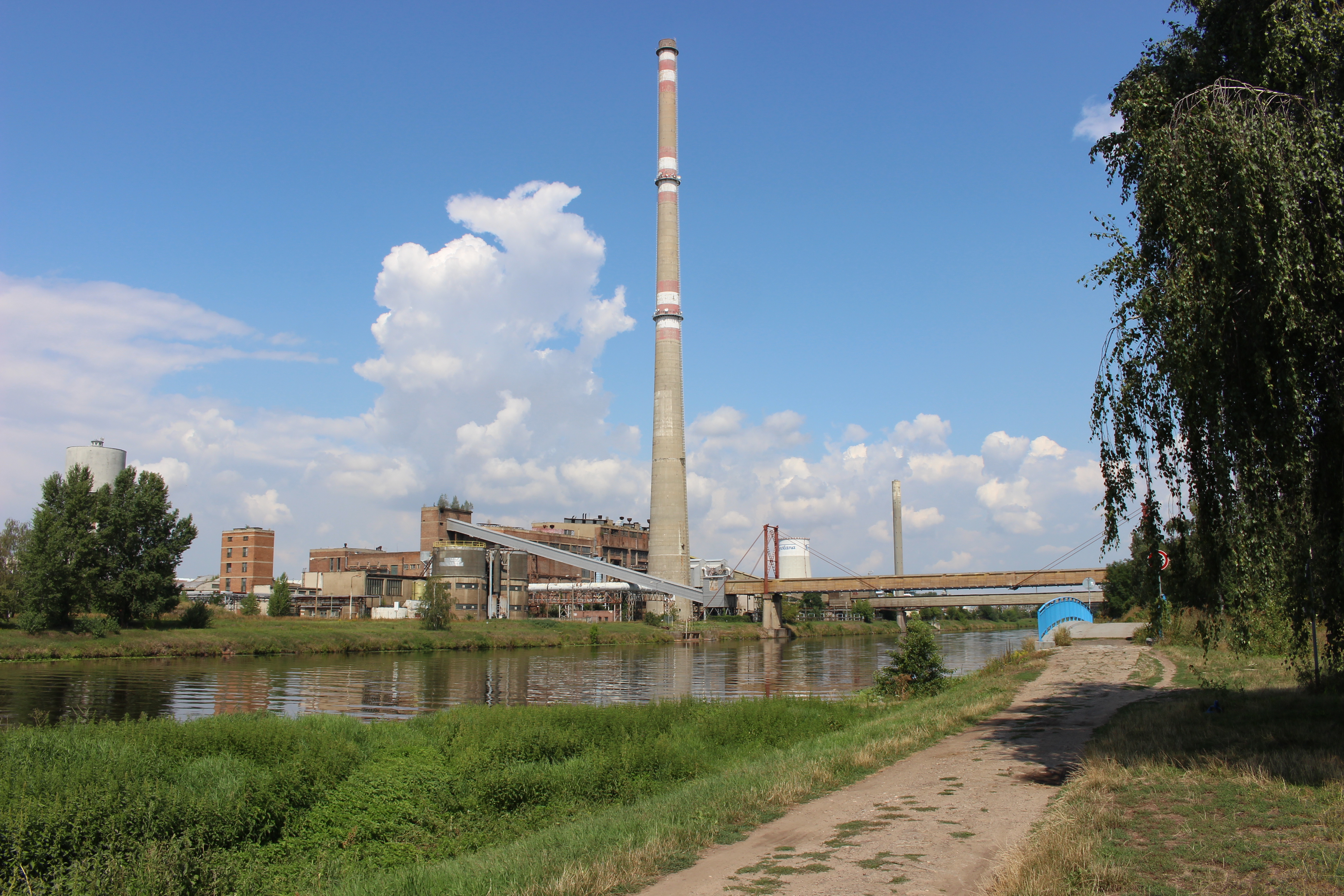
Spolana Neratovice factory

The town is known as an industrial centre. The largest industrial companies are Spolana (a chemical plant) and Cayman Pharma (a manufacturer of active pharmaceutical ingredients). Spolana employed more than 600 people, but due to poor demand for its products, the company decided to reduce its workforce to 150 in 2025 and maintain only sulfuric acid production.

== Transport ==
The I/9 road (which connects the D8 motorway with Česká Lípa and the Czech–German border) runs next to the town.

Neratovice is located on the railway line Prague–Mladá Boleslav, further continuing to Tanvald. Neratovice is also the starting point of the local lines to Čelákovice and Kralupy nad Vltavou. The town is served by four stations: Neratovice, Neratovice sídliště, Neratovice město and Lobkovice.

== Sights ==
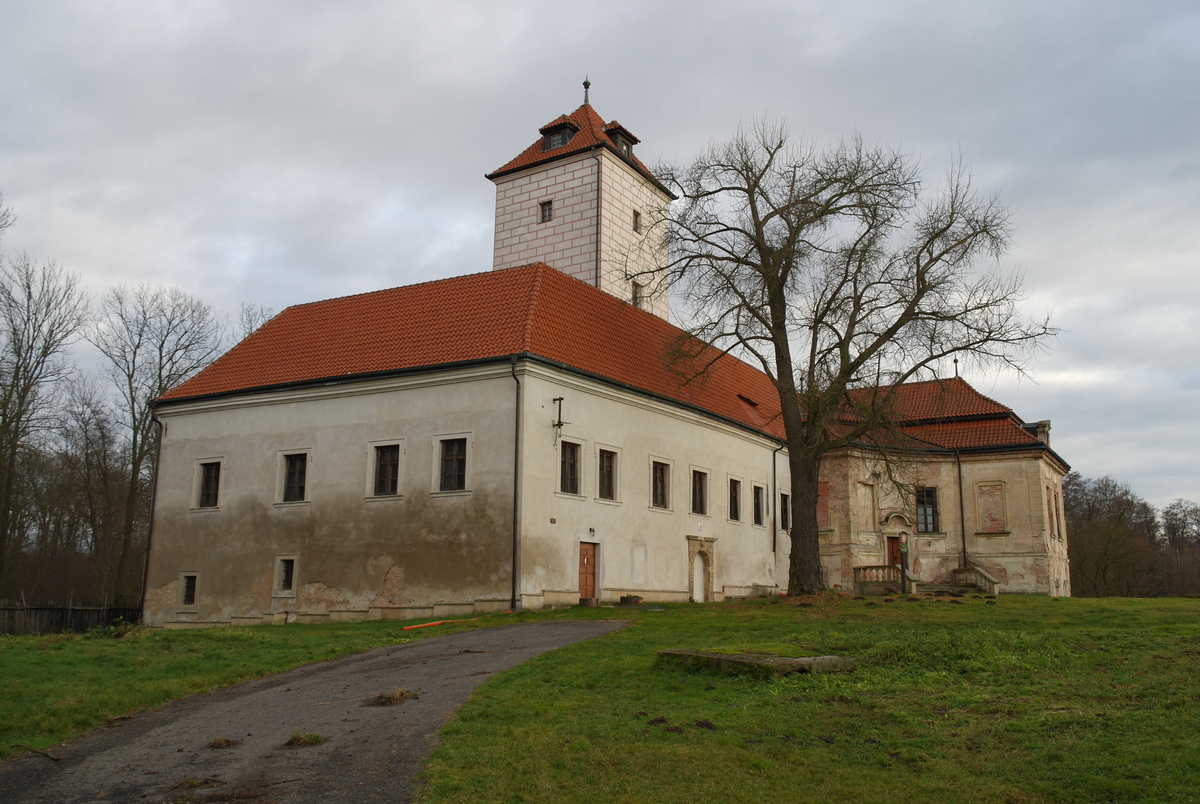
Lobkovice Castle

The main historical monument is the Lobkovice Castle in Lobkovice. The original fortress was rebuilt into a Renaissance castle in 1610 at the latest. Only a tower survived the Thirty Years' War. A new Baroque castle was added to the tower in 1679 and in this form the castle has been preserved to this day. Today the castle is owned by the Lobkowicz family and is closed to the public until the reconstruction is completed.

== Notable people ==
- František Palacký (1798–1876), historian and politician; stayed here in 1852–1860 and is buried here

== Twin towns – sister cities ==
Neratovice is twinned with:

- Radeberg, Germany
