= Energy in the Czech Republic =

Energy in the Czech Republic describes energy and electricity production, consumption and import in the Czech Republic.

== Energy in 2020 ==
Electricity produced using:

- Coal 43.1%
- Nuclear 33.3%
- Bioenergy and waste 20.5%
- Solar 0.9%
- Hydro 0.8%
- Wind 0.3%
- Thermal 0.3%

Energy consumed:

- Coal 30.3%
- Oil 21.1%
- Nuclear 19.5%
- Natural gas 18.1%
- Bioenergy and waste 11.9%

== Fossil fuels ==
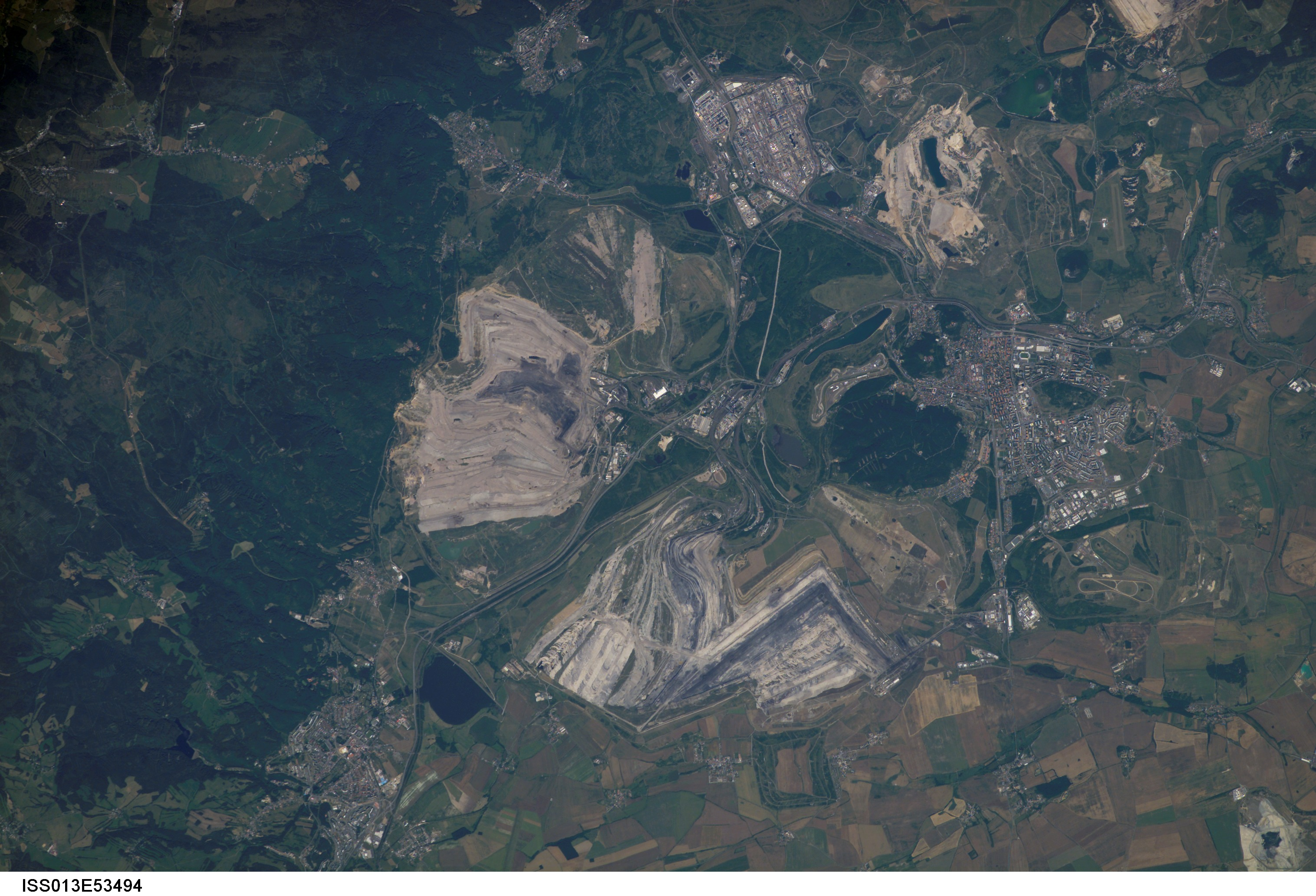
A coal mine in the Czech Republic, taken in 2006 from the International Space Station

=== Coal ===
OKD is a major mining company in the Czech Republic.

Coal usage: 2019 40.9 Mt, 2020 31.5 Mt, 2021 31.4 Mt, 2022 35.1 Mt

The country aims to phase out coal power by 2038 or earlier.

=== Oil and gas ===
Oil and gas deposits in the Czech Republic are in Moravia.

Crude oil from Russia comes through the Druzhba pipeline via Ukraine. The Ingolstadt–Kralupy–Litvínov pipeline can bring crude oil from Germany and be connected to the Transalpine Pipeline.

The Country has two refineries, owned by Česká rafinérská. The Litvinov refinery needs to be modified to process non-Russian grade oil.

The Gazela Pipeline allowed gas to be supplied from other countries by connecting through Germany at Brandov or Rozvadov or through Slovakia via Lanžhot.

Gas usage: 2020 8.8 Bcm, 2021 9.4 Bcm, 2022 7.8 Bcm, 2023 7.1 Bcm.

In April 2025 it was reported that the Czech Republic has achieved full independence from Russian oil supplies for the first time in its history, ending over 60 years of reliance. This milestone was made possible by the completion of capacity upgrades to the Transalpine (TAL) pipeline, which transports oil from Italy through Germany to the Czech Republic. The enhanced TAL pipeline now delivers 8 million tonnes of oil annually, sufficient to meet the country's entire demand. Prime Minister Petr Fiala announced the development at the central oil depot in Nelahozeves, emphasizing that the Czech Republic is now fully supplied by non-Russian oil through western routes. Previously, the country received about half of its oil imports via the Druzhba pipeline from Russia. The state-owned pipeline operator MERO completed the TAL expansion at the end of 2024, enabling this significant shift in energy sourcing.

== Electricity ==
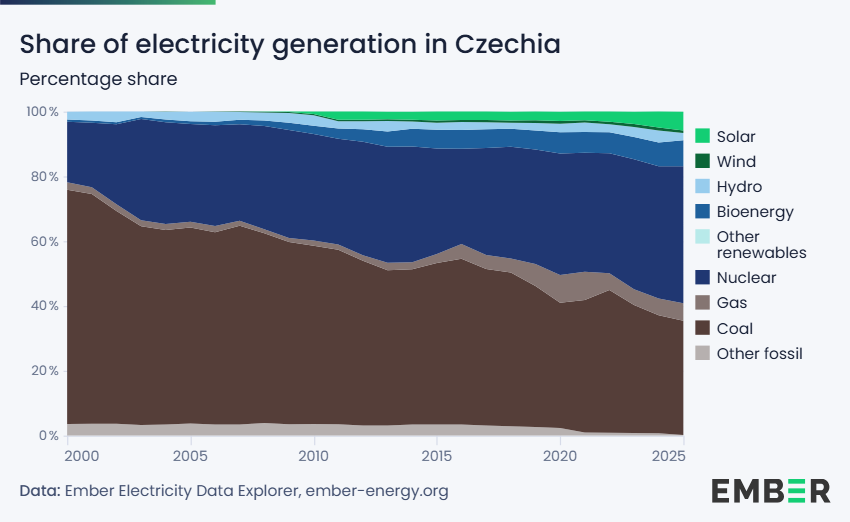
Share of electricity generation in Czechia - percentage share

In 2022 Electricity production was 78.8 terawatt-hours (TWh), whilst consumption was 60.4 TWh.

53.60% was generated from fossil fuels, mostly lignite, 40.95% nuclear and 5.46% renewables.

== Environment ==
In 2014, the emissions of carbon dioxide were 10.4 tons per capita. The EU average was 7.9 tons per capita. Czech Republic's emissions were comparable to those of Japan or the Netherlands.

=== Renewable energy ===
In 2023, the city of Brno is working to modernise its heat generation and distribution infrastructure. Teplárny Brno received a €75 million loan from the European Investment Bank for this modernization. The initiative aims at lowering the country's reliance on oil imports, and consists of a wood chip-fuelled heat and power biomass unit.

== Business ==
According to Forbes list of billionaires (2011) Czech billionaire Zdeněk Bakala ($2 B 2011) has made his wealth in coal business. Forbes ranked Zdenek Bakala (Net Worth$1.5 B) as richest Czech in energy business (coal) in 2013.

Bakala is the biggest player on the coal market in Central Europe. He has consolidated Polish mining markets into his company New World Resources.

== Overview ==
Energy in Czech Republic
	Capita	Prim. energy	Production	Export	Electricity	CO_{2}-emission
	Million	TWh	TWh	TWh	TWh	Mt
2004	10.2	530	398	136	63.5	118.8
2007	10.3	532	392	134	67.1	122.1
2008	10.4	519	382	144	67.4	116.8
2009	10.5	488	363	132	64.1	109.8
2012	10.5	505	373	140	66.0	112.7
2012R	10.5	496	380	126	66.3	107.8
2013	10.5	488	351	137	66.1	101.1
Change 2004-09	2.9%	-7.8%	-8.9%	-2.8%	0.9%	-7.5%
Mtoe = 11.63 TWh, Prim. energy includes energy losses that are 2/3 for nuclear power 2012R = CO2 calculation criteria changed, numbers updated

Primary energy consumption per million people in 2008 was 50 TWh compared to other countries (TWh): Canada 93 (3103 TWh 33.3), USA 87 (26,560 TWh 304.5), UK 40 (2,424 TWh 61.4), Greece 31 TWh (354 TWh 11.24) and Poland 30 (1138 TWh 38.12).

== See also ==
- Energy law
- History of the Czech Republic
