= Paraffin oil =

Paraffin oil may refer to:

- (in British English) paraffin, called kerosene in North American English
- (in North American English) any of various hydrocarbon oils obtained from petroleum, for example mineral oil
