= Jakob Christof Rad =

Austrian entrepreneur and inventor

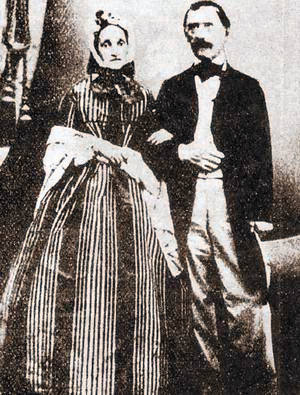
Jakob Christof Rad and Juliana Rad

Jakob Christof Rad (Anglicised Jacob Christoph Rad, Czech: Jakub Kryštof Rad; 25 March 1799 – 13 October 1871) was a Swiss-born Austrian medical doctor and industrial manager. He had many other professional activities, was a director of a sugar factory in Dačice, Moravia, Austria-Hungary (now the Czech Republic) in 1843, and invented the process and associated machinery for cutting large block sugar into manageable uniform pieces. Rad is credited with the invention of sugar cubes.

== Biography ==
Rad was born on 25 March 1799 in Rheinfelden, Switzerland. He was the father of 16 children. He died in 1871 in Vienna.

== Invention of the cube sugar ==
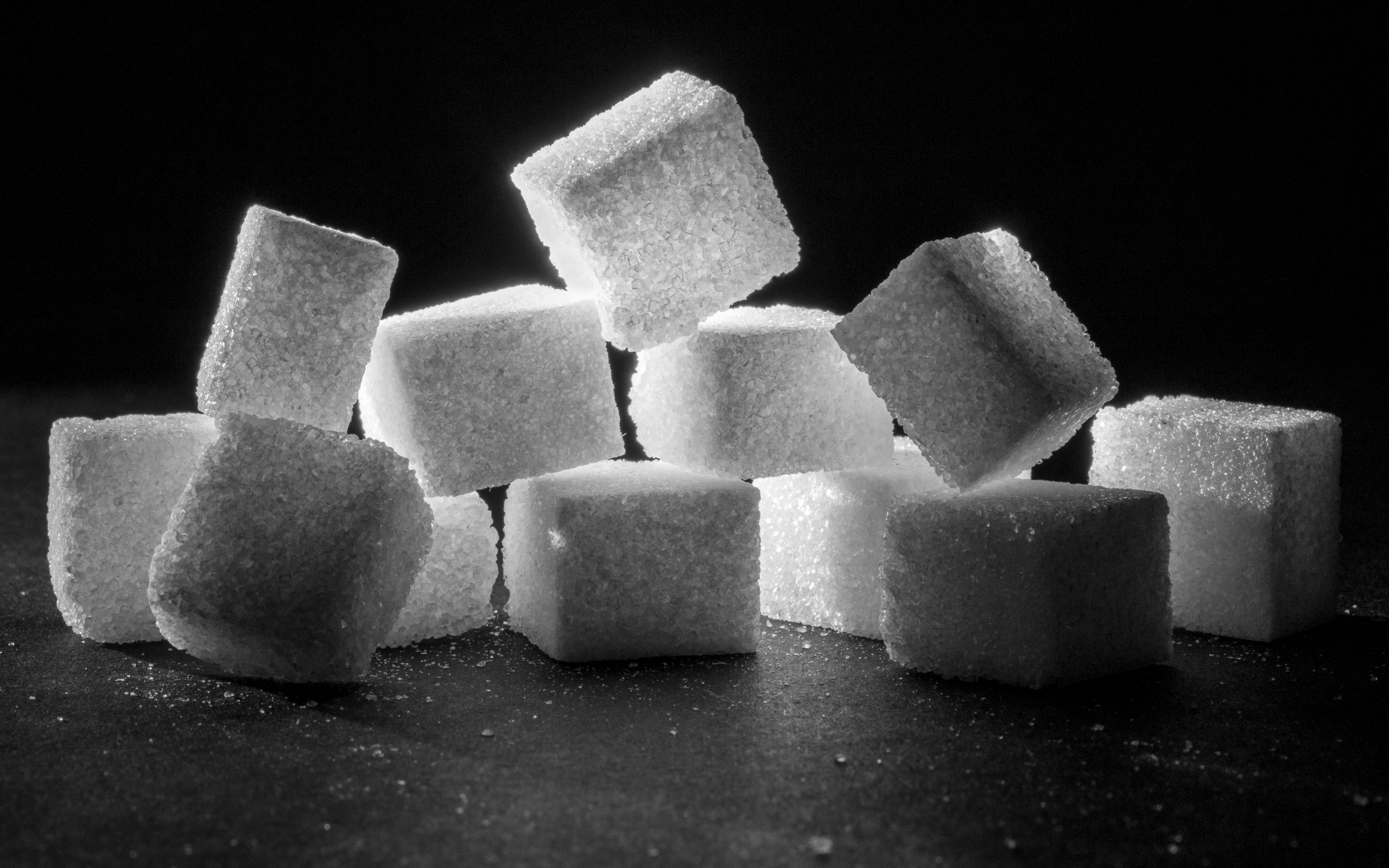
Sugar cubes, invention of Jakob Christof Rad

Rad is credited with the invention of sugar cubes. The idea to produce sugar in cube form came from his wife, who cut herself while paring down the standard large, commercial sugar loaf into smaller parts for use in the home. Rad had become involved with management of a sugar factory in 1840 in the south-west Moravian town of Dačice (present day Czech Republic). He began work on a machine for transforming sugar into cube form, leading to a five-year patent for the cube press he invented, granted on 23 January 1843. Rad had started a business producing the "tea sugar" that was ultimately unsuccessful. The factory set up in Dačice went into bankruptcy, Rad returned to Vienna in 1846, production stopped, the invention was forgotten. The sugar cubes were successfully mass-produced 30 years later using a different process.
