= Dobrohošť =

Dobrohošť is name of several places:

- Dobrohošť, Dunajská Streda District - village in Slovakia
- Dobrohošť (Jindřichův Hradec District) - village in the Czech Republic
