= Sugar cube =

Sugar packed into a cuboid shape

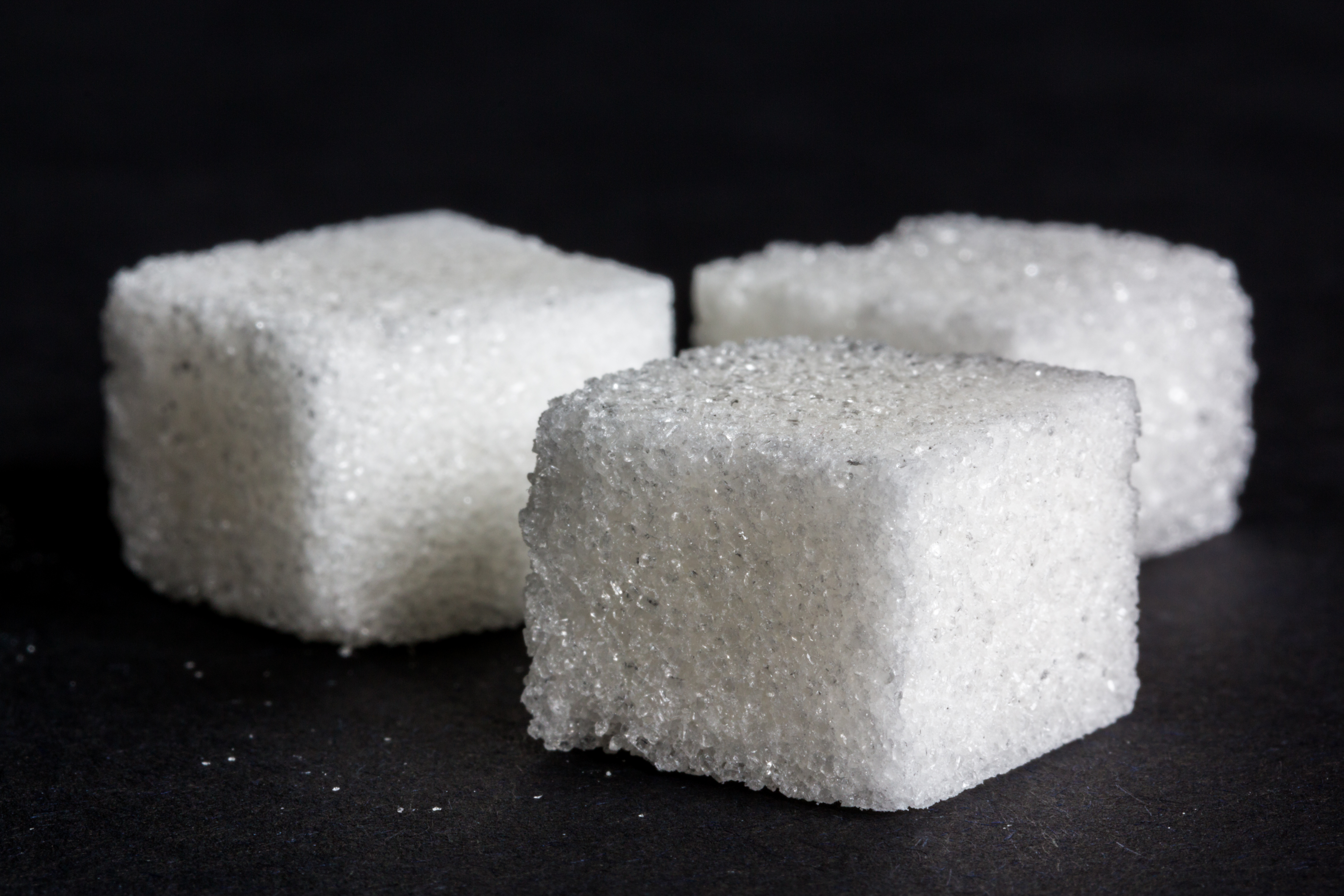
Sugar cubes

Sugar cubes (also known as sugar lumps in British English) are white sugar granules pressed into small cubes measuring approximately 1 teaspoon each. They are usually used for sweetening drinks such as tea and coffee. They were invented in the early 19th century in response to the difficulties of breaking hard "sugarloaves" into small uniform size pieces. They are often found in cafes and restaurants, although their popularity as a DIY sweetener has waned with the rise of barista cafes. Nevertheless they still have many uses such as arts and crafts and at formal events. They have also become a metaphor for the amount of sugar in a product.

== Size and packaging ==
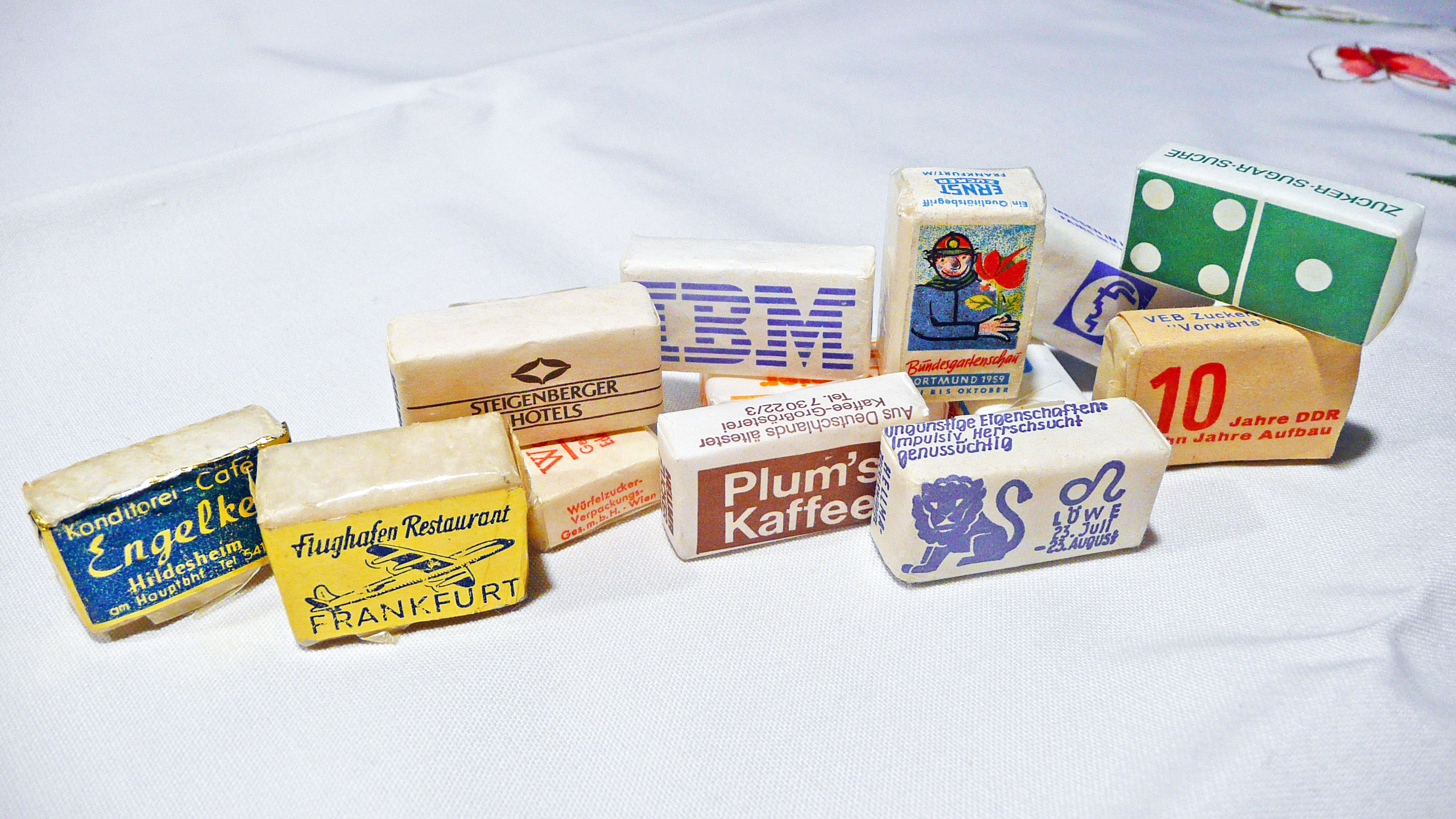
Two-piece sugar cube packaging (Germany)

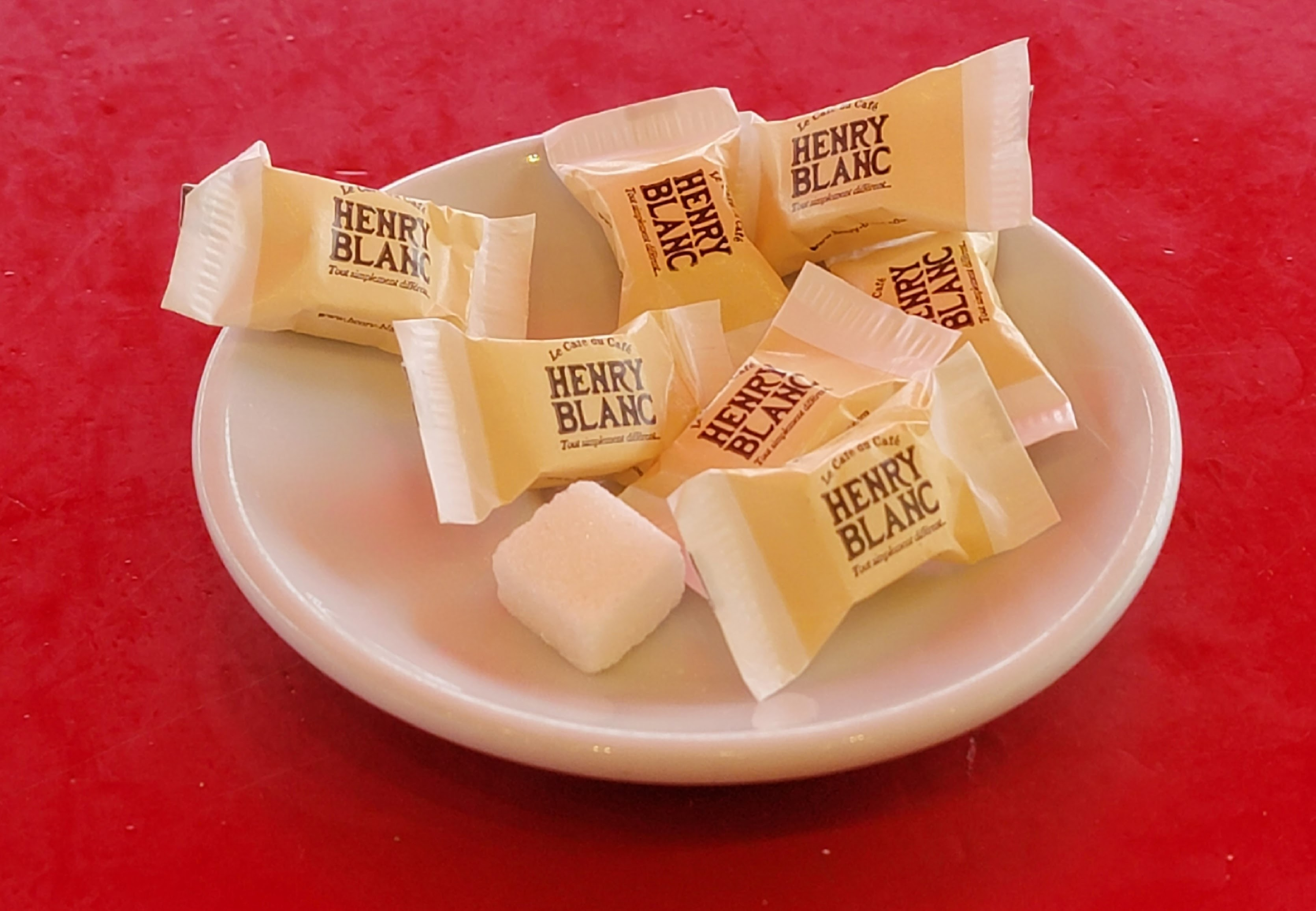
Individually wrapped sugar cubes (France, 2023)

The typical size for each cube is between 16 by 16 by 11 millimetres (0.6 by 0.6 by 0.4 inches) and 20 by 20 by 12 millimetres (0.8 in × 0.8 in × 0.5 in), corresponding to the weight of approximately 3–5 grams, or approximately 1 teaspoon. However, the cube sizes and shapes vary greatly; for example, playing card suits-shaped pieces are produced under the name "bridge cube sugar".

The typical retail packaging weight is 0.5 kilogram (1 pound) or 1 kilogram / 2 pounds.

In 1923 German wholesaler Karl Hellmann started packaging pairs of cubes into individual wrappings with advertisements or collectible pictures on the sleeves. Originally very popular in cafés, by the 21st century they had mostly been replaced with packets and sticks of granulated sugar.

== Manufacturing ==
When making the cubes, granulated sugar is slightly (2–3%) moistened, placed into a mold and heated so that the moisture can escape. The firmness, density, and speed of dissolution of the cube are controlled via the crystal size of the granulated sugar, amount of water/steam added, molding pressure, and speed of drying. The dissolution speed is important, as consumers who place the sugar into their mouths prefer denser, slower-dissolving sugar.

The input material usually requires a wide distribution of sizes (from 500 microns and up) for cube stability.

The cubes are made on highly automated lines capable of processing up to 50 tons of sugar per day. Typically, one of three common processes is used to produce more popular soft cubes:

- Vibro process of Swedish Sugar Corporation (from the late 1950s) utilizes vibration to fill the molds and to get the formed cubes out. Heat radiation oven is used for drying;
- Chambon process was invented in France in 1949 and uses a rotating molding unit and a vertical dryer;
- Elba process is similar to Chambon.

== History ==
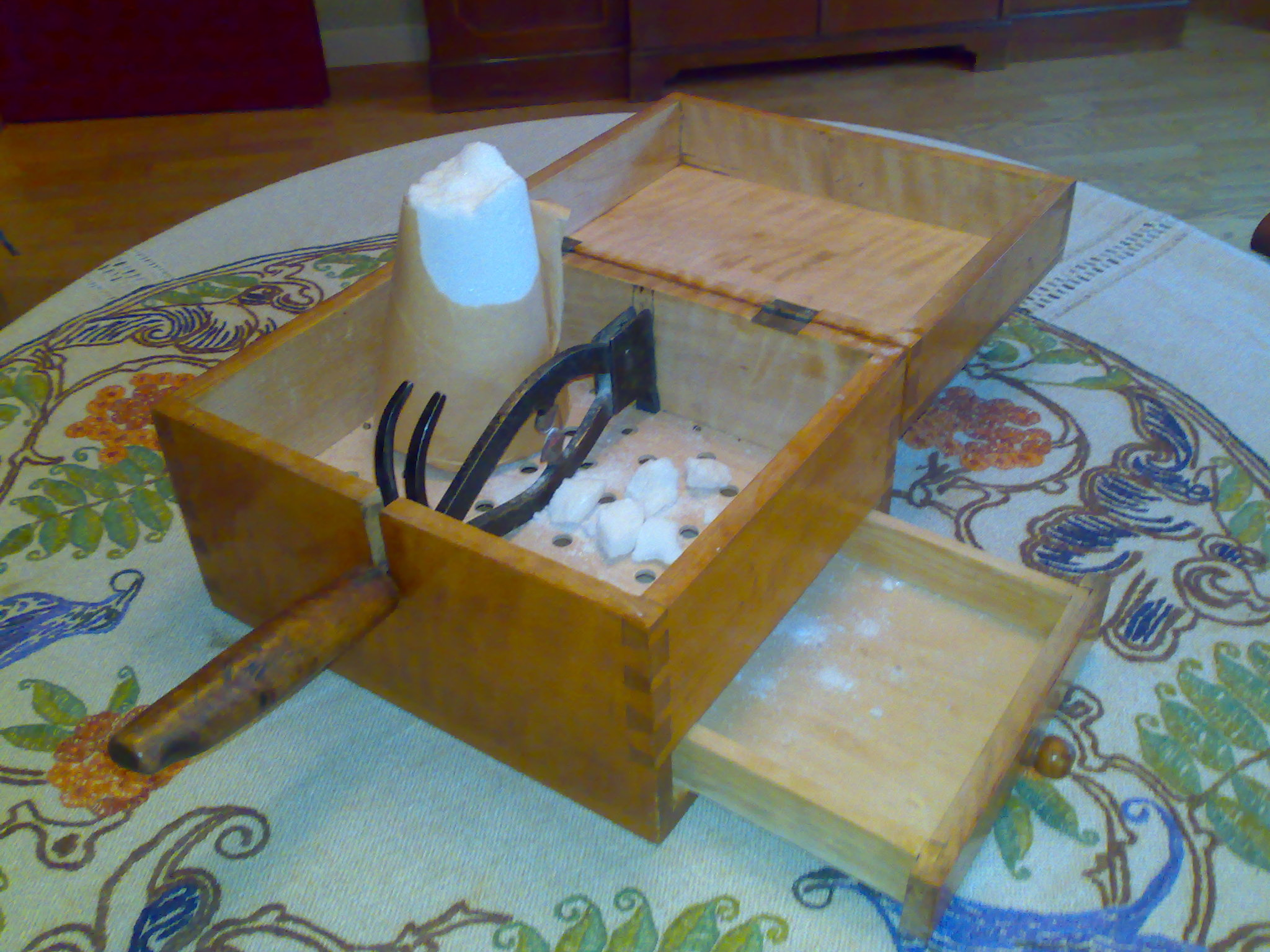
Sugarloaf cutting box with tools

Historically, sugar was usually shipped as hard solid "sugarloaves", which are difficult to break into small uniform pieces, giving rise to sharp tools and similar contraptions (see photo). The resulting pieces were irregular in size, and if a piece was too large, either sugar nips had to be used, or the piece had to be dunked into the tea cup, and after sufficient dissolution, removed and set aside. The latter option was described by Lev Tolstoy in his "Where Love Is, God Is": "Stepanich drank his glass, turned it upside down and set the leftover bit of sugar on it".

Jakub Kryštof Rad, the Swiss inventor of the first sugar cube, started his effort after his wife hurt herself while chopping a sugarloaf. Rad had made the first sugar cubes in the early 1840s at a factory in Dačice in present day Czechia, by pressing moist sugar into a tray resembling a modern ice cube tray and letting the cubes dry. Despite Rad obtaining a patent in 1843, his business was ultimately unsuccessful.

The next breakthrough came almost 30 years later, when Eugen Langen, of Pfeifer & Langen, used a centrifuge to produce blocks of sugar that were subsequently cut into cubes. Henry Tate (Tate & Lyle) acquired from Langen exclusive rights for producing the cubes in Britain (on 13 March 1875) and started the first large-scale manufacturing of sugar cubes. Tate placed a very large bet on the innovation, temporarily running into personal financial difficulties to the extent that he had to pull his daughter from the boarding school she attended. The contract with Langen involved royalties, but the factory was successful, producing 214 tons of cubes in 1878 and 1,366 tons in 1888.

In 1880 Tate acquired rights to another process, invented in Belgium by Gustav Adant, where sugar "tablets" were manufactured on rotating machines and then sliced into cubes (at the time, they were called "dominoes"). The new process replaced the Langen one in 1891 and was a huge success; standard quotes for refined sugar in London started to be expressed in Tate's cubes. Adant's process is still used, for example, at the Raffinerie Tirlemontoise (since 1902), to make extremely hard cubes popular in Belgium, France, and Arab countries.

The first process to mold cubes without any cutting was invented in Boston by Charles H. Hersey ("Hersey drum", 1879); some of these units, modified in 1929 to produce fancy shaped pieces, are still in use today.

== Use ==
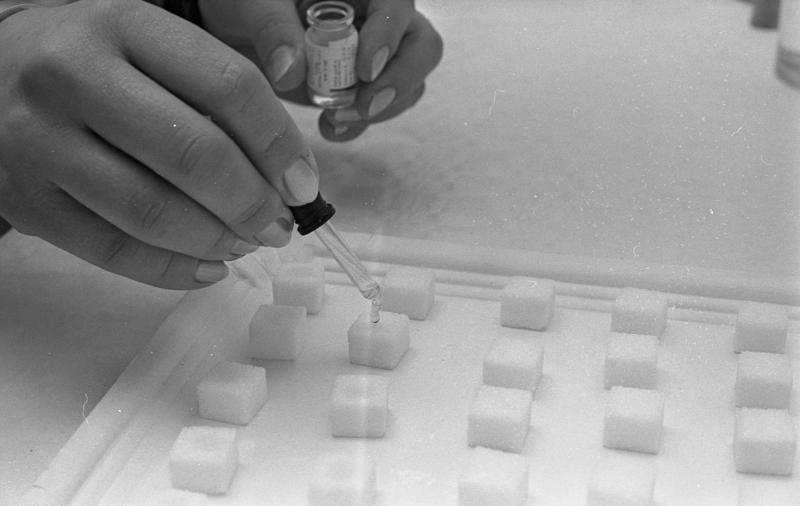
Doses of oral polio vaccine being added to sugar cubes for use in a 1967 vaccination campaign in Bonn, West Germany

The cubes were and are mostly used to sweeten tea and coffee - the original Rad's pieces were even sold as "tea-sugar". However, the popularity of artificial sweeteners, together with the trend of switching from filtered coffee to cappuccino-like drinks, has turned sugar cubes into a niche product primarily used in bars or served at formal afternoon tea events.

The specialty uses of sugar cubes include:

- the classical Old Fashioned cocktail recipe with a sugar cube infused with Angostura bitters;
- paraphernalia for serving absinthe includes a slotted absinthe spoon on top of the glass. A sugar cube is placed onto the spoon and a slow drip of water dissolves the sugar into the drink, creating the desired milky louche effect (a more bohemian version involves putting the soaked cube aflame);
- sugar cubes can be infused with a drug, making a calibrated oral delivery simple. This was used both for administering the polio vaccine and for distribution of drugs like LSD (leaving the "cube" as a slang term for the latter);
- a great variety of colored and sculpted sugar cubes (shaped as flowers and animals) is marketed in Japan.

Sugar cubes are often used to visually represent how much sugar is in a product, such as soft drinks, by building pyramids of sugar cubes and photographing in front of the product. Experiments showed this method was persuasive in convincing people to consume less sugar.

== Arts ==
=== Architecture ===
The sugar-cube metaphor in architecture dates back to 1922, originally proposed by Walter Gropius. It comes back "every five years" with a variety of ambiguous meanings, from strictly regimented design (cf. works of Theo van Doesburg) to "unity in variety" (cf. Mediterranean hill towns) to whitewashed plain facades of the Cyclades.

=== Contemporary art and sculpture ===
A monument with a sugar cube on top stands in the Czech town of Dačice, the place where the first sugar cube factory was established by Rad. The significance of this monument and the sugar cube's form was later explored by Russian artist Leonid Tishkov in his 2012 multimedia project Kubvechnosti (Cube of Eternity), which explicitly links the sugar cube to the geometric abstraction of the Russian avant-garde. Tishkov's work explores the childhood of suprematist pioneer Kazimir Malevich, whose father worked as a manager in Ukrainian sugar refineries, with Tishkov implying that the young Malevich frequently played with early, machine-pressed sugar cubes. As part of the project, Tishkov constructed architektons (abstract architectural models originally conceptualized by Malevich) entirely out of stacked sugar cubes. Tishkov used the ephemeral nature of the sugar cubes as a metaphor for the ultimate failure and dissolution of the avant-garde's utopian ideals under the Soviet regime.

In 1936, surrealist artist Meret Oppenheim created the Sugar Ring, a piece of "alimentary art" that featured a commercial sugar cube encased in a custom gold-plated silver ring. By elevating a disposable, frangible sugar cube to the status of a precious gemstone, the work highlighted sugar's historical associations with luxury, addiction, and chemical volatility.

Multiple art galleries display the works of Irish sculptor Brendan Jamison, specializing on architecture-themed pieces made of sugar cubes.

=== Architectural modeling in education ===
In the United States, sugar cubes have played a prominent role in educational architectural modeling, most notably in the California mission projects. For decades, fourth-grade students in California public schools were assigned to build miniature scale models of historic Spanish missions.

Sugar cubes became the most popular medium for this craft assignment due to their affordability, accessibility in the home, and uniform shape, which conveniently mimics the look of whitewashed adobe bricks when stacked. However, the tradition has faced heavy criticism from scholars and Indigenous activists. Critics argue that using a sweet, domestic, and "fun" material like sugar cubes inherently romanticizes the state's colonial era and literally "whitewashes" the oppressive history of the mission system, obscuring the realities of the forced Native American labor used to construct the original buildings.

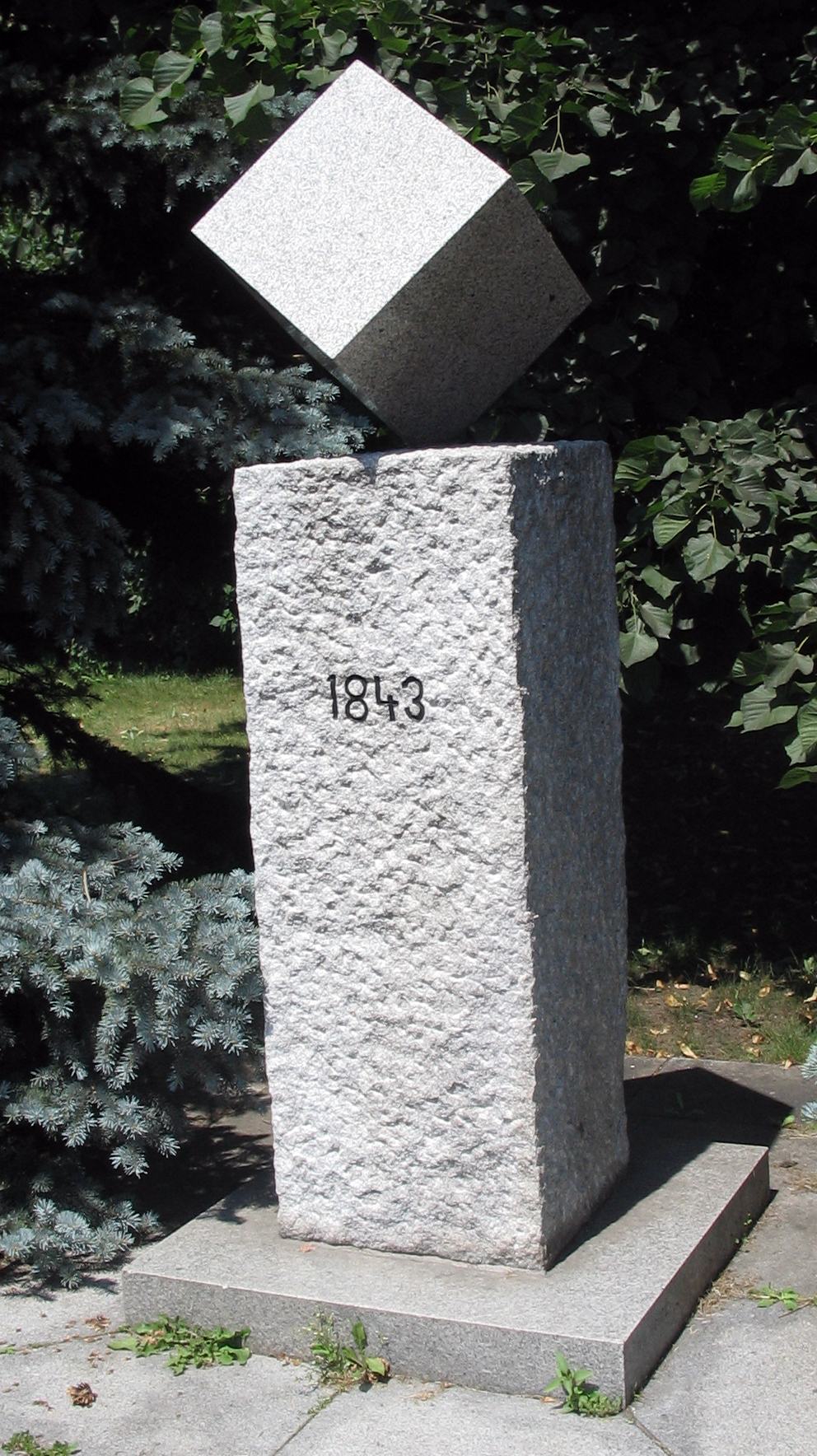
Sugar cube monument in Dačice

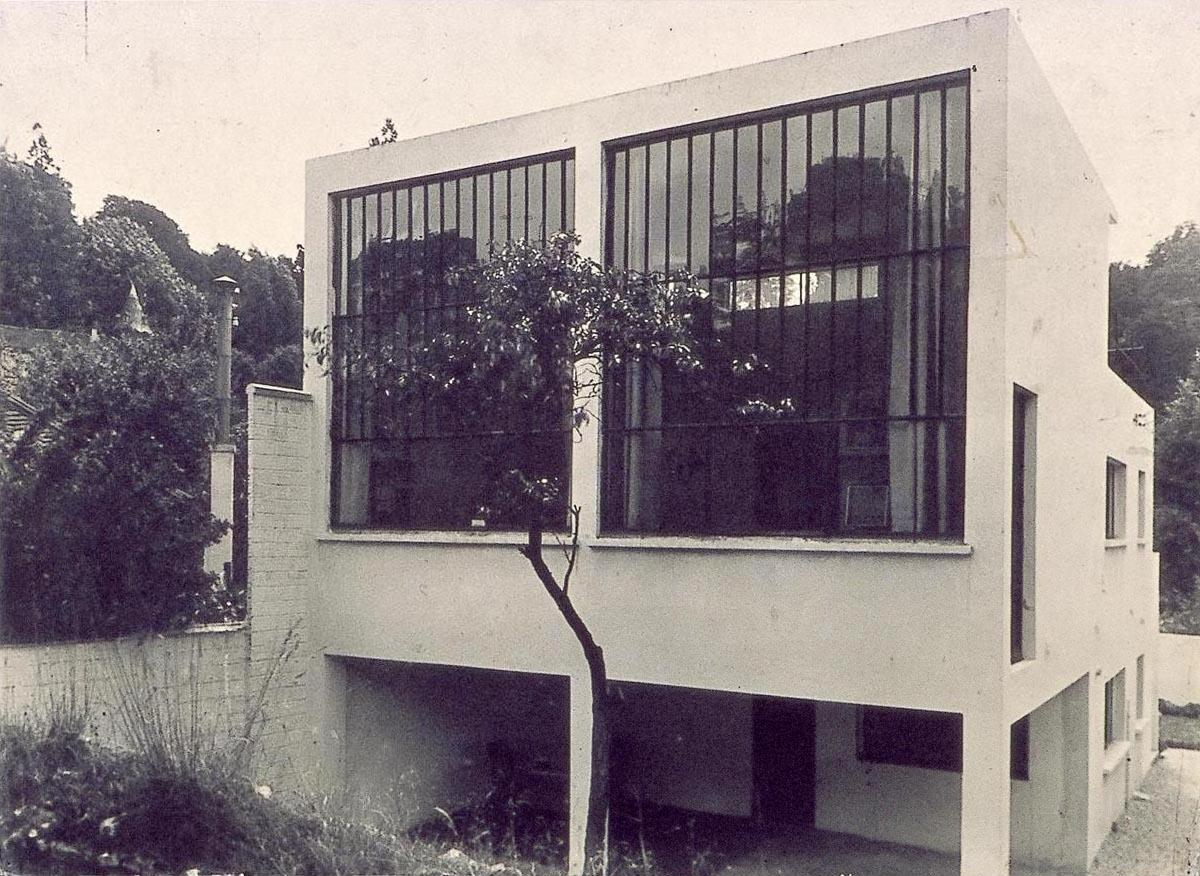
House of van Doesburg

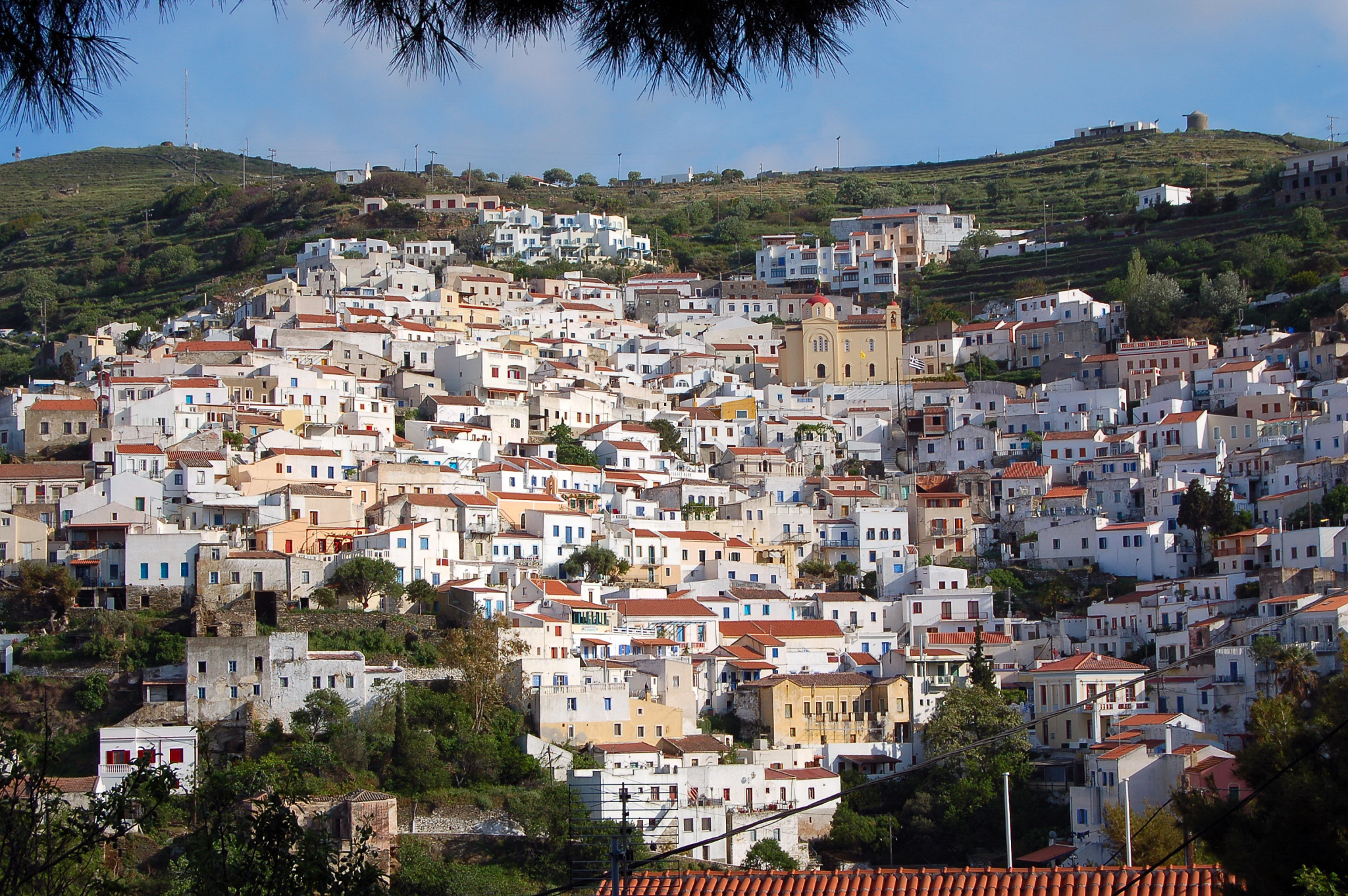
Houses on Kea island (Cyclades)

== Sources ==
- Asadi, M. (2006). "Cube Sugar". Beet-Sugar Handbook. Wiley. pp. 454–455. ISBN 978-0-471-79098-3.
- Chalmin, P. (1990). "Thames Refinery and the Cubes". The Making of a Sugar Giant: Tate and Lyle, 1859–1989. Harwood Academic Publishers. ISBN 978-3-7186-0434-0.
- Drahoňovská, Lucie Pantazopoulou (2018). "From Round to Square". Fehler. Goethe-Institut.
- Gernalzick, Nadja (2023). ""Sugar Is Not a Vegetable:" The Mediality of Sugar in Anthropocenic Entanglements". In Gernalzick, Nadja; Imorde, Joseph (eds.). The Mediality of Sugar. Leiden; Boston: Brill. pp. 235–286. ISBN 978-90-04-51322-8.
- Grigorieva, Alexandra (2015). "sugar cubes". The Oxford Companion to Sugar and Sweets. Oxford University Press. doi:10.1093/acref/9780199313396.001.0001. ISBN 978-0-19-931339-6.
- Harbison, Robert (2003). "The avant-garde in twentieth-century architecture". Companion to Contemporary Architectural Thought. Routledge Companion Encyclopedias. Taylor & Francis. pp. 458–461. ISBN 978-1-134-98381-0.
- Hildebrand-Schat, Viola (2023). "Sugar Cubes That Revolutionized Art: Malevich's Artistic Project as Interpreted by Leonid Tishkov in Kubvechnosti (2012)". The Mediality of Sugar. Brill Publishing. pp. 173–195. doi:10.1163/9789004513686_009. ISBN 978-90-04-51322-8.
- Jencks, C. (2002). The New Paradigm in Architecture: The Language of Post-modernism. Yale University Press. ISBN 978-0-300-09513-5.
- Karnik, Jamie Sierra (2023). "Sugar Cube Mission Models in California Primary Schools and the Whitewashing of Native American Labor". In Gernalzick, Nadja; Imorde, Joseph (eds.). The Mediality of Sugar. Leiden; Boston: Brill. pp. 216–234. ISBN 978-90-04-51322-8.
- Kaysers, Harry; Schweck, Hubert; Delavier, Hans-Joachim (1998). "Special crystal sugar products. Cube sugar, nib sugar and loaf sugar". In van der Poel, Pieter; Schieweck, Hubert M.; Schwartz, Thomas K. (eds.). Sugar Technology. Beet and Sugar Cane Manufacture. Berlin: Verlag Dr. Albert Bartens KG. pp. 962–964. ISBN 3-87040-065-X.
- Kennedy, Pagan (16 November 2012). "Who Made That Sugar Cube?". The New York Times Magazine.
- Kirschner, Sebastian (2 March 2016). "Die Würfel sind gefallen". Süddeutsche Zeitung Magazin (in German). Archived from the original on 5 July 2018.
- Labrecque, Lauren I.; Warr, Garret M.; Labrecque, Joseph (2016). "Absinthe: An Exploration of the Role of Mythology and Ritual in Market Revival". Celebrating America's Pastimes: Baseball, Hot Dogs, Apple Pie and Marketing?. Developments in Marketing Science: Proceedings of the Academy of Marketing Science. Cham: Springer International Publishing. pp. 325–328. doi:10.1007/978-3-319-26647-3_67. ISBN 978-3-319-26646-6. ISSN 2363-6165.
- Pennington, N.L.; Baker, C.W., eds. (1990). Sugar: User's Guide To Sucrose. An Avi Book Series. Springer US. ISBN 978-0-442-00297-8.
- Strang, J.; Arnold, W. N; Peters, T. (18 December 1999). "Absinthe: what's your poison?". BMJ. 319 (7225): 1590–1592. doi:10.1136/bmj.319.7225.1590. ISSN 0959-8138. PMC 1127080. PMID 10600949.
- Twardowski, Mariusz (2019). "Santoryn a sprawa architektury nowoczesnej" [Santorini and the modern architecture affair] (PDF). Środowisko Mieszkaniowe (in Polish) (28). Uniwersytet Jagiellonski – Wydawnictwo Uniwersytetu Jagiellonskiego: 60–71. doi:10.4467/25438700sm.19.031.11368. ISSN 1731-2442. S2CID 213734448.
