= Dobrohošť (Jindřichův Hradec District) =

- Municipality
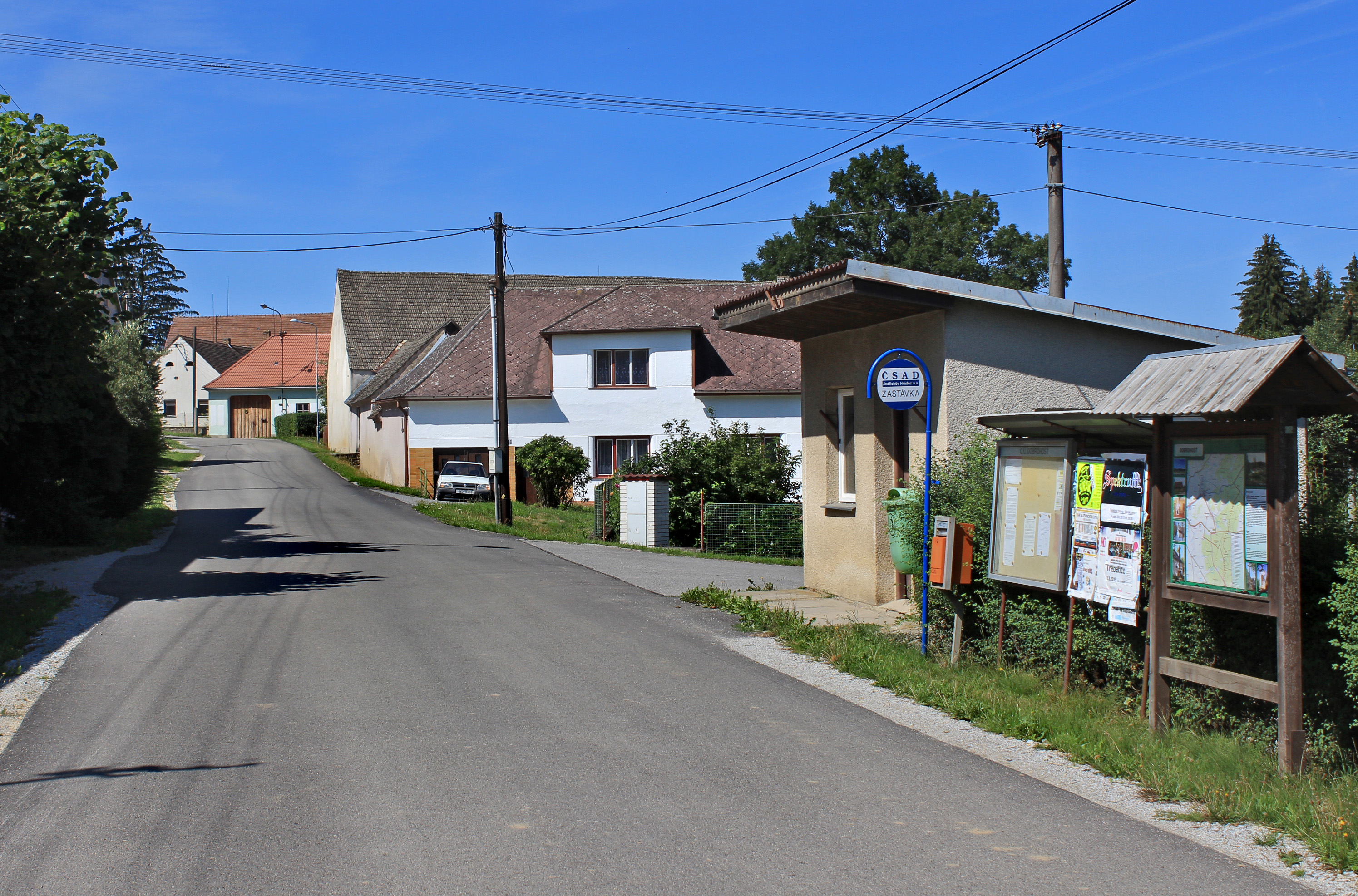
- Main street

- Flag Coat of arms

- Location in the Czech Republic
- Coordinates: 49°4′42″N 15°29′19″E
- Country: Czech Republic
- Region: South Bohemian
- District: Jindřichův Hradec
- First mentioned: 1399

Area
  - Total: 3.38 km^{2} (1.31 sq mi)
- Elevation: 515 m (1,690 ft)

Population (2026-01-01)
  - Total: 45
  - Density: 13/km^{2} (34/sq mi)
- Time zone: UTC+1 (CET)
  - Summer (DST): UTC+2 (CEST)
- Postal code: 380 01
- Website: www.radnice-dobrohost.cz

Dobrohošť is a municipality and village in Jindřichův Hradec District in the South Bohemian Region of the Czech Republic. It has about 50 inhabitants.

Dobrohošť lies approximately 37 kilometres (23 mi) east of Jindřichův Hradec, 76 km (47 mi) east of České Budějovice, and 136 km (85 mi) south-east of Prague.

== History ==
The first written mention of Dobrohošť is from 1399. Until 1610, the village belonged to the Bílkov estate. From 1610 until the establishment of an independent municipality in 1849, it was a part of the Dačice estate.

== Demographics ==
Historical population
Year	Pop.	±%
1869	78	—
1880	79	+1.3%
1890	79	+0.0%
1900	81	+2.5%
1910	72	−11.1%
1921	83	+15.3%
1930	88	+6.0%
1950	44	−50.0%
1961	59	+34.1%
1970	53	−10.2%
1980	40	−24.5%
1991	46	+15.0%
2001	44	−4.3%
2011	47	+6.8%
2021	45	−4.3%
Source: Censuses
