= Sugar nips =

Tool used to create individual servings of sugar

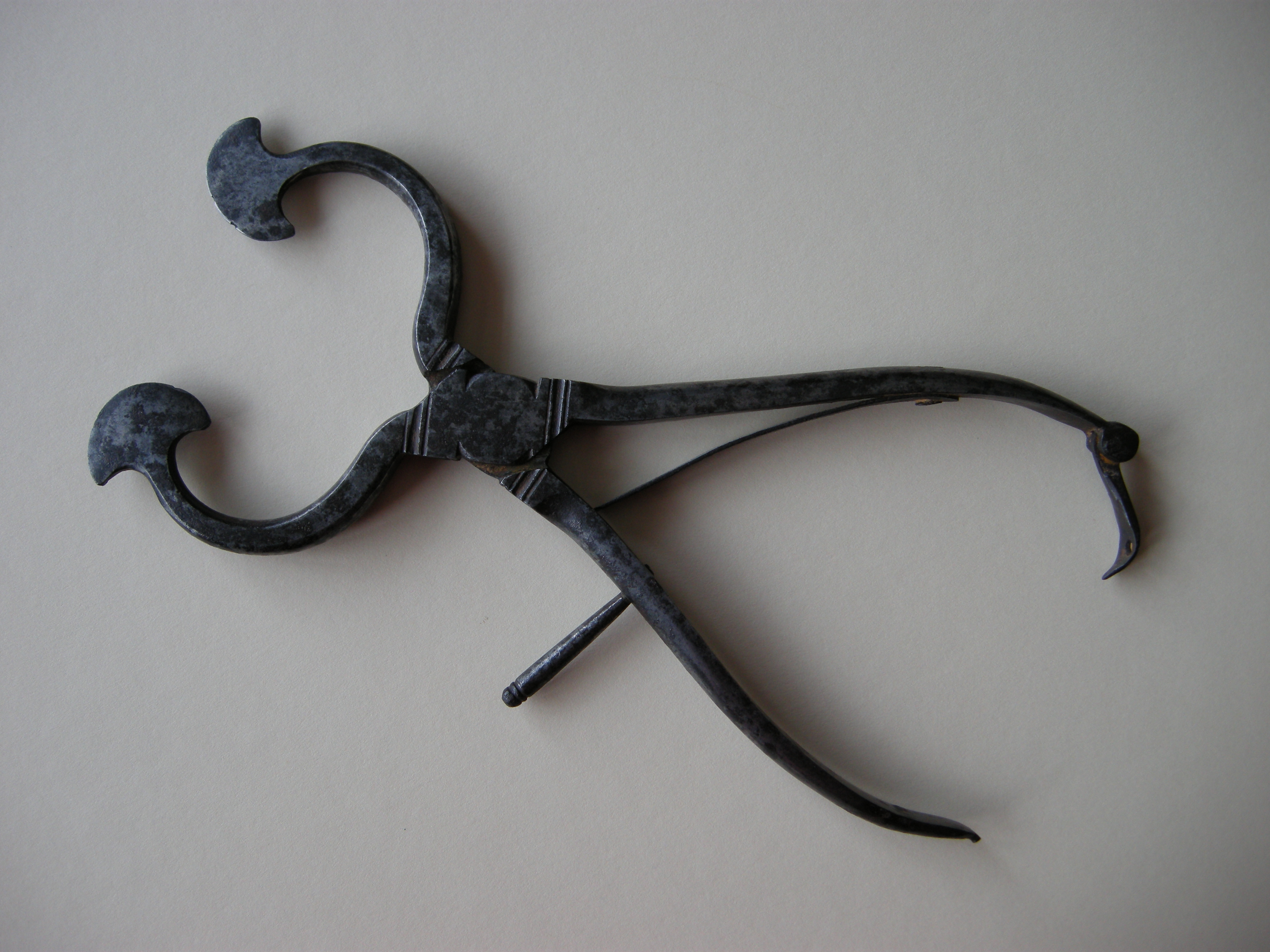
Sugar nips for cutting a sugarloaf into smaller pieces

Sugar nips are a large pair of pincers with sharp blades, designed to cut sugar from a block. Before the introduction of granulated and cube sugars in the second half of the 19th century, the domestic consumer purchased sugar in the form of a sugarloaf, or at least a part of one, and pieces were cut from it by hand using sugar nips and other tools, such as sugar hammer. Greater leverage and improved safety was provided by heavier sugar nips set in a wooden base for counter- and table-top use.
