= Sugarloaf =

Refined sugar molded into a conical shape for commercial distribution

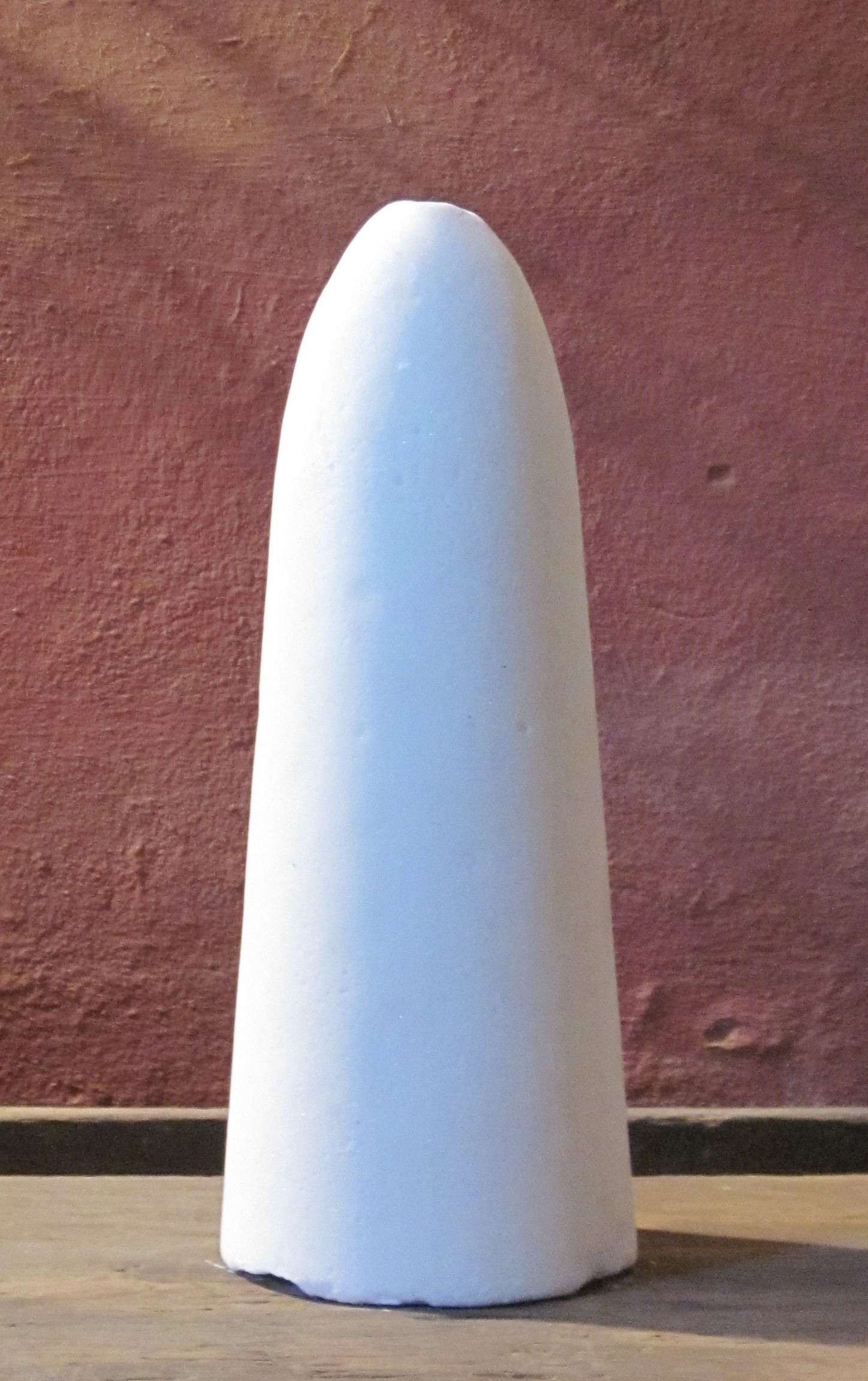
A sugarloaf

A sugarloaf was the usual form in which refined sugar was produced and sold until the late 19th century, when granulated and cube sugars were introduced. A tall cone with a rounded top was the end product of a process in which dark molasses, a rich raw sugar that was imported from sugar-growing regions, such as the Caribbean and Brazil, was refined into white sugar.

== History ==
The earliest record to date appears to be 12th century in Jordan, though reference to a cone of sugar is found in al-Zubayr ibn Bakkar's 9th century Arabic Al-Akhbar al-Muwaffaqiyyat. In Europe, they were made in Italy from 1470, Belgium from 1508, England from 1544, the Netherlands from 1566, Germany from 1573, and France from 1613. When refining from sugar beet began in mainland Europe in 1799, loaves were produced in the same way.

Until the mid-19th century, the British government used a system of punitive taxes to make it impossible for its colonial producers in the Caribbean to refine their own sugar and supply Britain with finished sugarloaves. Previously, the Amsterdam industry had been similarly protected from the importation of East India white sugar. Instead, a dark raw sugar or muscovado, produced on the plantations by initial boilings of the fresh cane juice, was shipped in hogsheads to Europe on what was the third leg of the triangular trade.

The sugarloaf was also the sign of a grocer, often found outside their premises or in the window, and sometimes found on their trade tokens.

== Process ==
The raw sugar was refined by a series of boiling and filtering processes. After the final boiling, it was considered ready for granulation and was poured into a large number of inverted conical molds. These were usually made of either brown earthenware or sheet iron with an internal treatment of slip or paint respectively, and each stood in its own collecting pot. Over the next few days most of the dark syrup and noncrystalline matter drained through a small hole in the bottom of the mould into the collecting pot. To improve the whiteness of the sugar, repeated applications of either a solution of white clay or of loaf sugar dissolved in warm water was applied to the broad end of the loaf. This slowly drained through the loaf, readily uniting with any remaining molasses or other coloring matter and removing it to the collecting pot. The loaves were then tapped out of the molds, dried in a store room containing hundreds of loaves, trimmed to their final shape and wrapped, usually in blue paper to enhance their white appearance.

Before use or at piont of sale a sugarloaf needed to be cut into smaller pieces. This was done using various implements: sugar axes, sugar hammers, sugar nips, sugar choppers, sugar scrapers, etc.

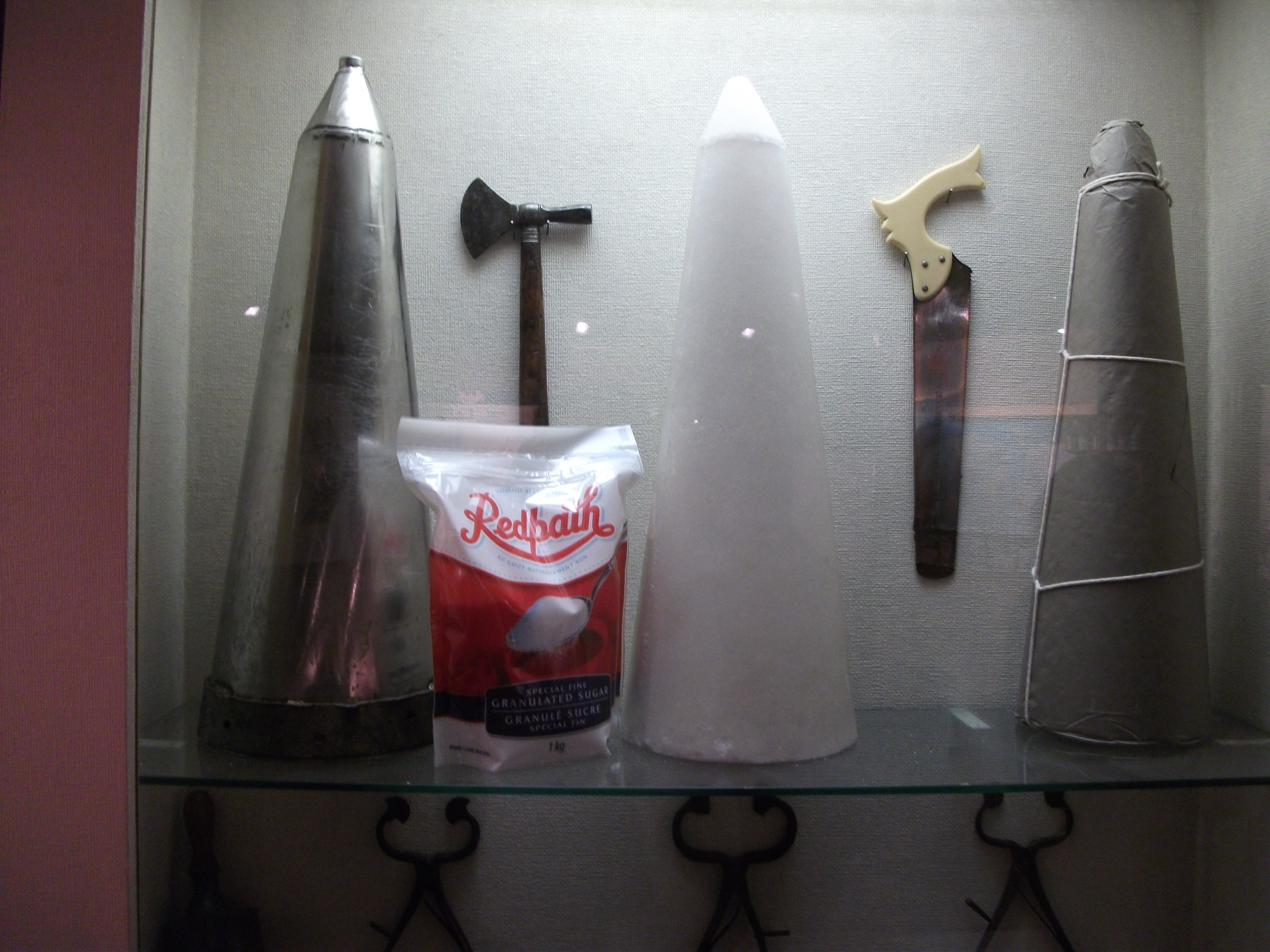
Sugar cones, axe, saw, and nips

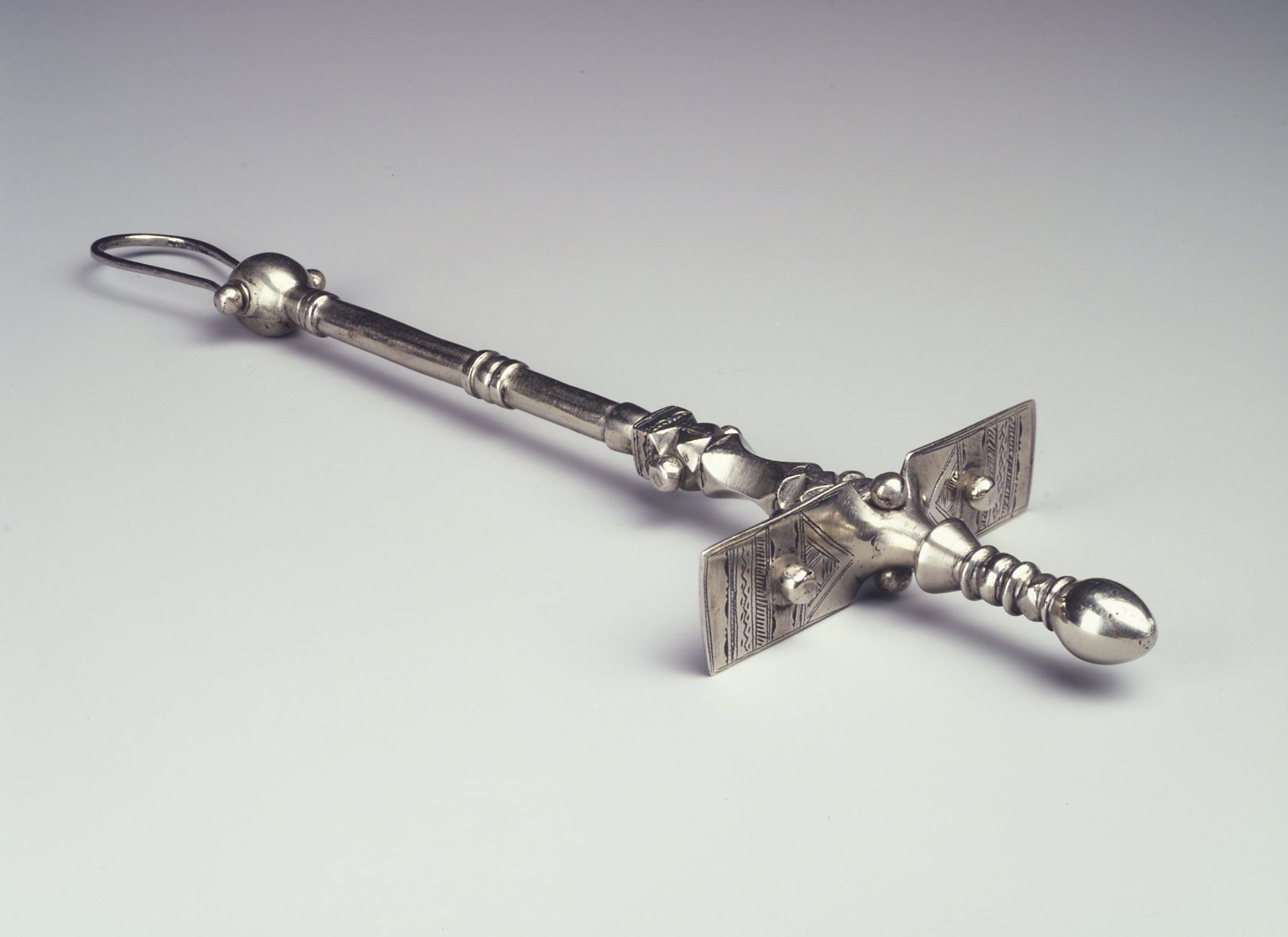
Sugar hammer

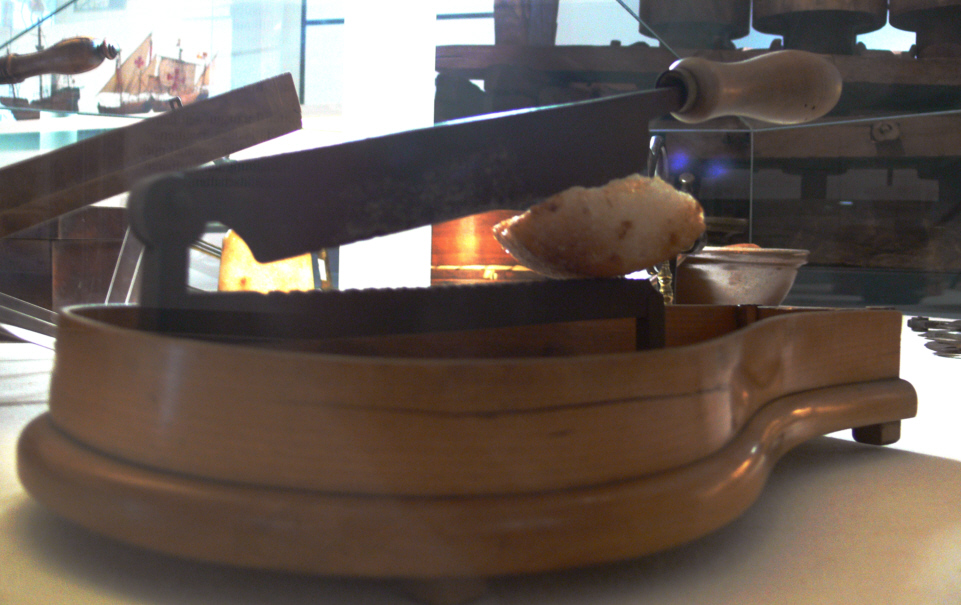
Sugar cutter

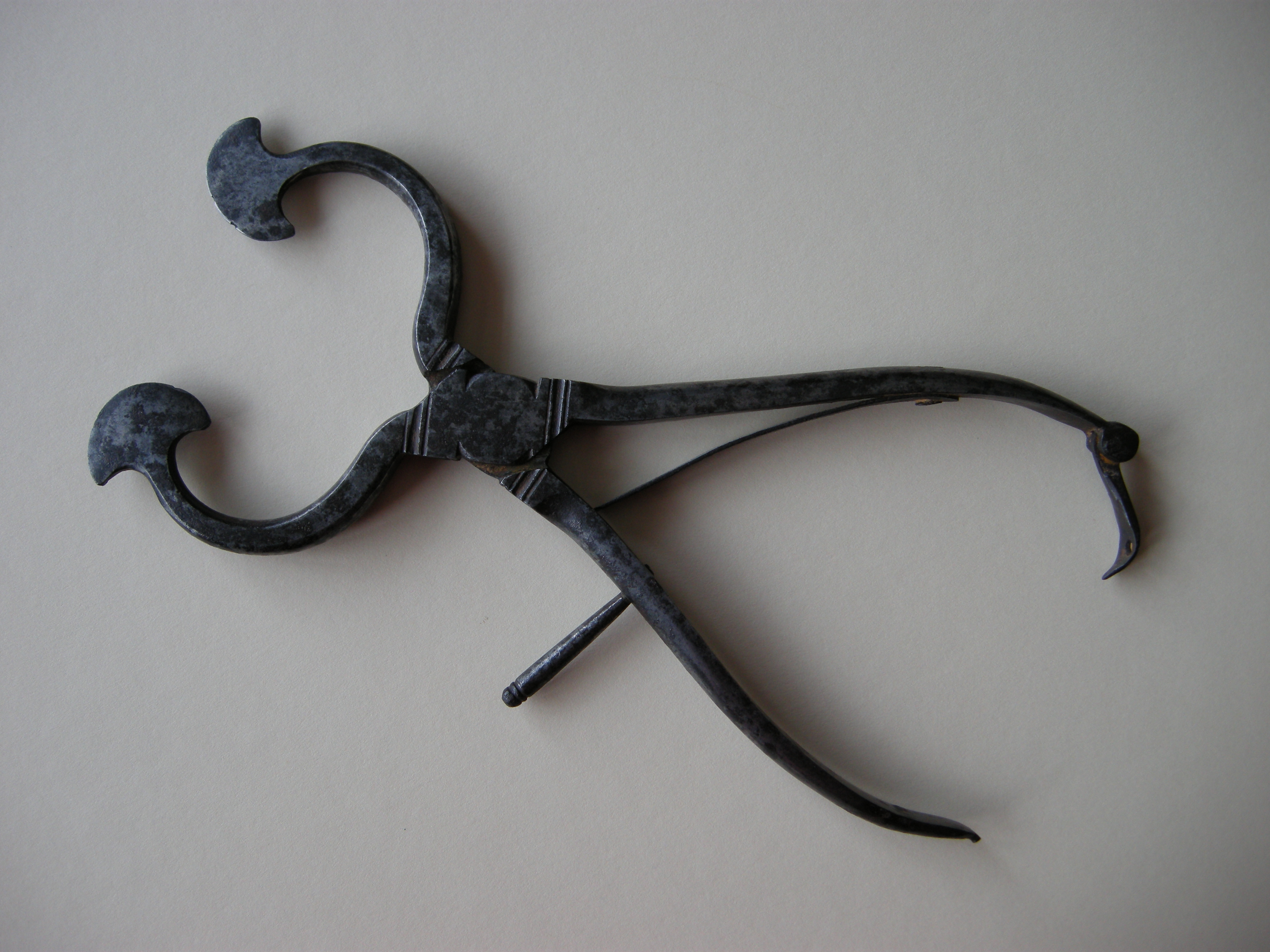
Sugar nips

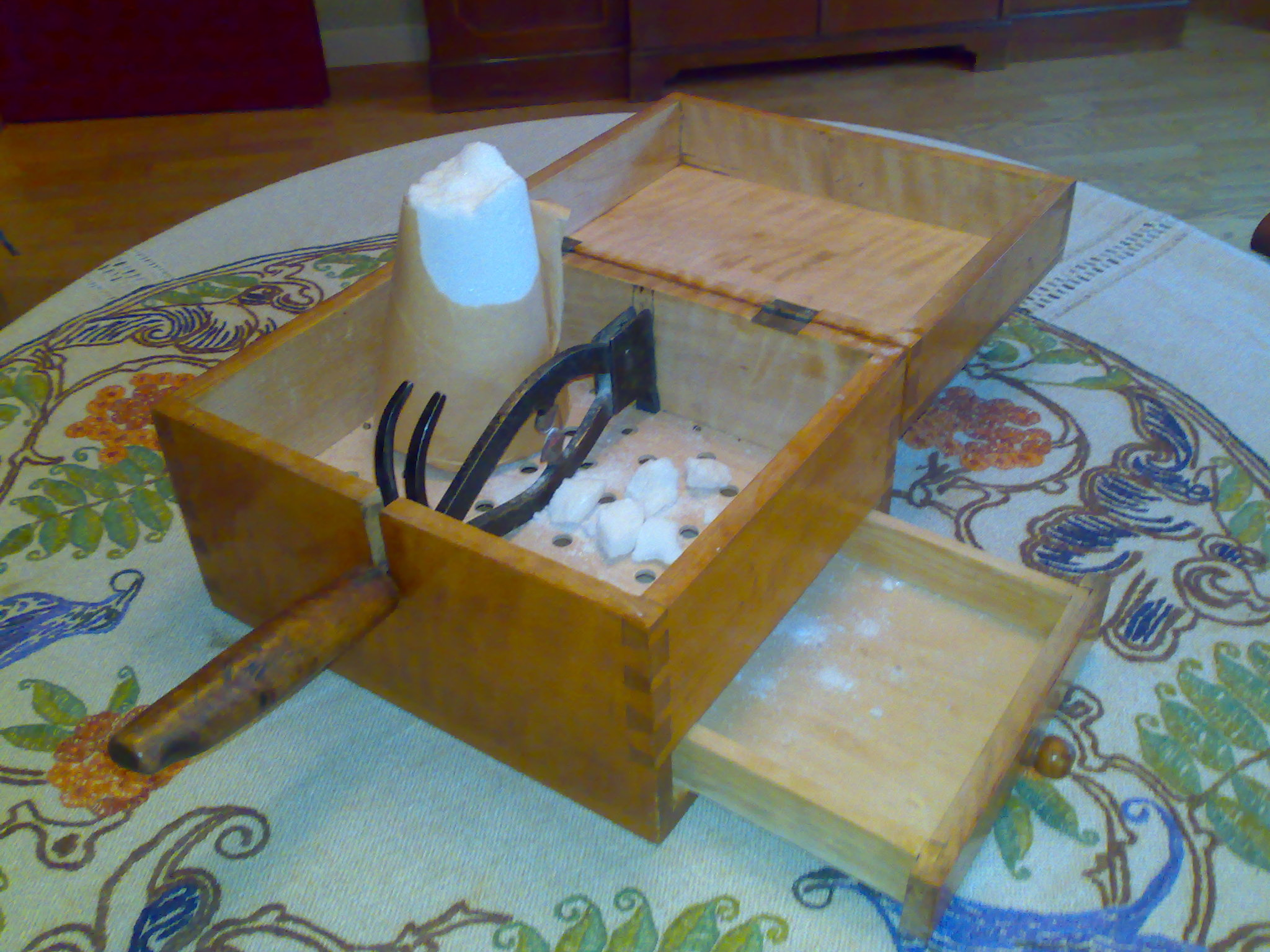
Sugarloaf cutting box with tools

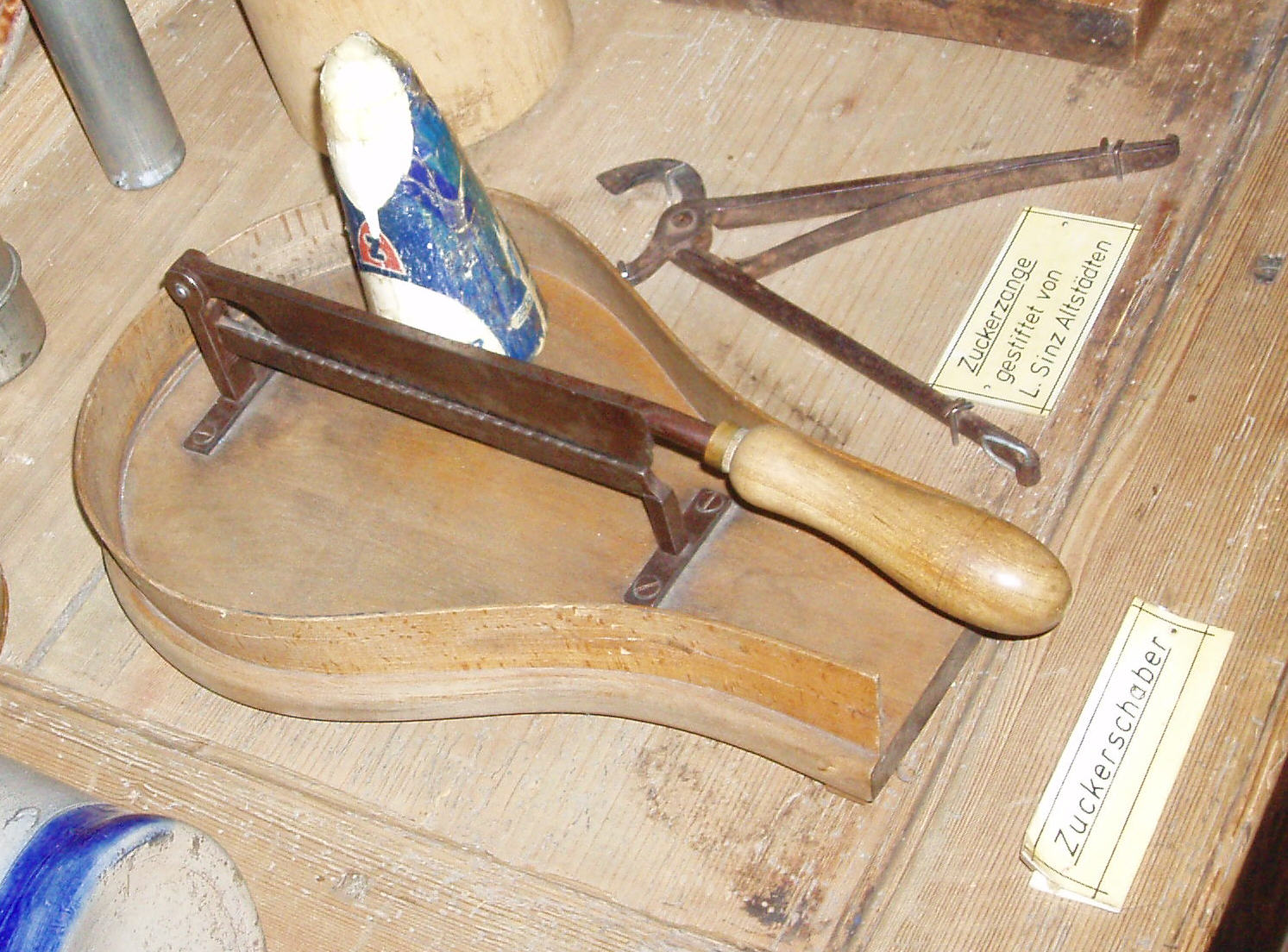
Sugar scraper and nips

See Media related to sugar-related equipment at Wikimedia Commons for more.

== Grades ==
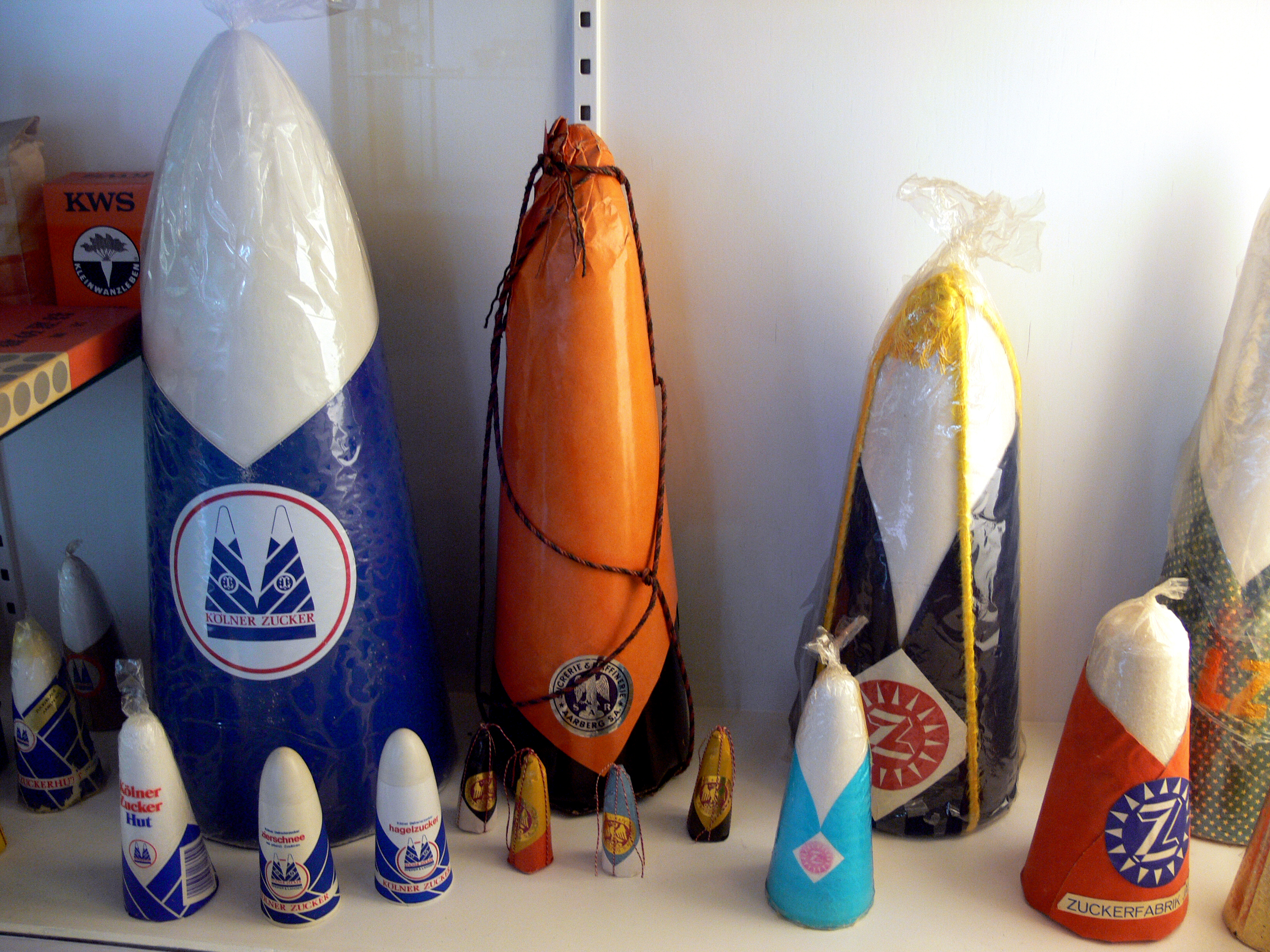
Sugar loaves of various sizes, on display in Berlin's Sugar Museum

The molds, and so the sugarloaves, varied in size considerably: the larger the loaf the lower the grade of sugar. The grade determined the price, though loaves were sold by weight and the sugar refiner was taxed on the weight of sugar sold. When a new batch of raw sugar was refined, the best sugar came from the first boiling. After that, the waste and trimmings from the first boiling were returned to the beginning of the process and mixed with further raw sugar for the second boiling, and, as this was repeated to the end of the batch, subsequent boilings reduced slightly in quality. The finest of the loaves—maybe 5 inches (13 cm) in diameter and 5 inches (13 cm) high—were extremely expensive owing to the prolonged repeating of the whitening process, as were the somewhat larger double refined loaves from the first few boilings. Lower grades of sugar were more difficult to crystallize and so larger molds were used—usually 10–14 inches (25–36 cm) in diameter and up to about 30 inches (76 cm) high—with loaves weighing up to 35 pounds (16 kg). The lowest standard refined grades were called bastards, though an even lower grade was often produced from the filtration scums, usually by a scum-boiler at his own separate premises.

Households bought their white sugar in tall, conical loaves, from which pieces were broken off with special iron sugar-cutters (sugar nips). Shaped something like very large heavy pliers with sharp blades attached to the cutting sides, these cutters had to be strong and tough, because the loaves were large, about 14 inches (36 cm) in diameter at the base, and 3 feet (0.91 m) [15th century]...In those days, sugar was used with great care, and one loaf lasted a long time. The weight would probably have been about 30 pounds (14 kg). Later, the weight of a loaf varied from 5 to 35 pounds (2.3 to 15.9 kg), according to the moulds used by any one refinery. A common size was 14 pounds (6.4 kg), but the finest sugar from Madeira came in small loaves of only 3 to 4 pounds (1.4 to 1.8 kg) in weight...Up till late Victorian times household sugar remained very little changed and sugar loaves were still common and continued so until well into the twentieth century...

— Elizabeth David, English Bread and Yeast Cookery

== Contemporary availability ==
While mostly superseded by granulated and cube sugar, sugarloaves are still produced in some countries. Moroccan sugarloaf (قالب السكر) has symbolized hospitality, generosity, and joy. In Iran, for instance, sugarloaves, (کله‌قند in Persian), are commonly available and regularly consumed. They are also particularly common in Germany, where, for instance, small loaves are a required ingredient for the traditional Christmas-season drink Feuerzangenbowle.

== See also ==
- Jaggery
- List of mountains named Sugarloaf
- Panela
- Peen tong – a Chinese slab brown sugar and sugar candy
