= Dačice =

- Town
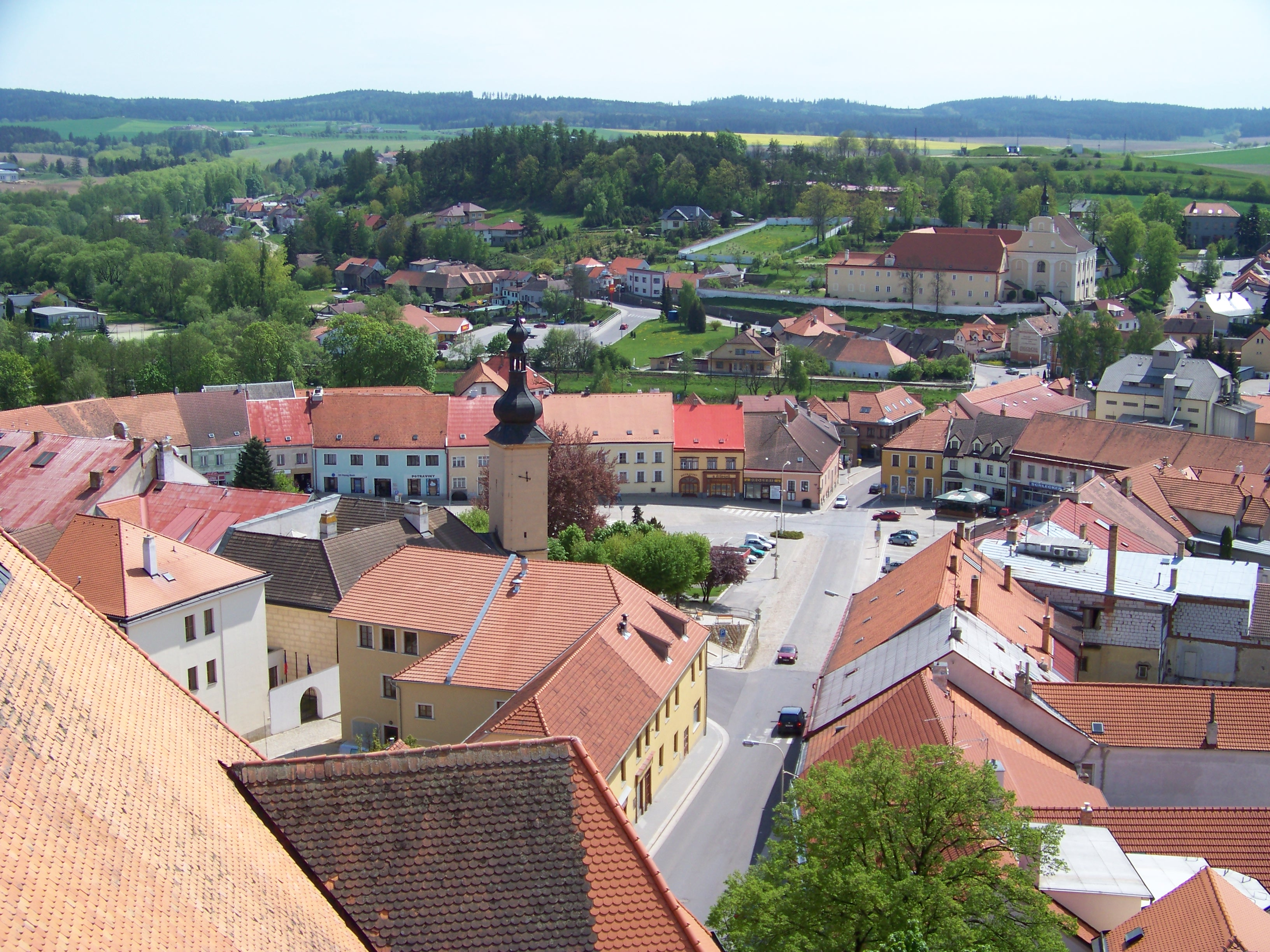
- Palackého Square

- Flag Coat of arms

- Location in the Czech Republic
- Coordinates: 49°4′54″N 15°26′14″E
- Country: Czech Republic
- Region: South Bohemian
- District: Jindřichův Hradec
- First mentioned: 1183

Government
  - Mayor: Jiří Baštář

Area
  - Total: 66.96 km^{2} (25.85 sq mi)
- Elevation: 477 m (1,565 ft)

Population (2026-01-01)
  - Total: 7,118
  - Density: 106.3/km^{2} (275.3/sq mi)
- Time zone: UTC+1 (CET)
  - Summer (DST): UTC+2 (CEST)
- Postal code: 380 01
- Website: www.dacice.cz

Dačice (Czech pronunciation: [ˈdatʃɪtsɛ]; German: Datschitz) is a town in Jindřichův Hradec District in the South Bohemian Region of the Czech Republic. It has about 7,100 inhabitants. The town is located on the Moravian Thaya River in the Křižanov Highlands.

Dačice is known as the home of the sugar cube, which was invented here in 1841 by Jakob Christof Rad. The historic town centre is well preserved and is protected as an urban monument zone.

== Administrative division ==
Dačice consists of 16 municipal parts (in brackets population according to the 2021 census):

- Dačice I (728)
- Dačice II (324)
- Dačice III (882)
- Dačice IV (548)
- Dačice V (2,838)
- Bílkov (380)
- Borek (150)
- Chlumec (115)
- Dolní Němčice (318)
- Hostkovice (96)
- Hradišťko (89)
- Lipolec (176)
- Malý Pěčín (141)
- Prostřední Vydří (55)
- Toužín (42)
- Velký Pěčín (140)

Prostřední Vydří forms an exclave of the municipal territory.

== Etymology ==
The name Dačice is derived from the personal name Dak or Dač (shortened forms of names such as Damír, Dabor or Dalimír).

== Geography ==
Dačice is located about 31 kilometres (19 mi) east of Jindřichův Hradec and 36 km (22 mi) south of Jihlava. Despite administratively being a part of the South Bohemian Region, the town lies in the historical land of Moravia. It lies in the Křižanov Highlands. The highest point is the hill Plec at 608 m (1,995 ft) above sea level.

The town is situated at the confluence of the Moravian Thaya River and its longest tributary, the Vápovka Stream. There are also many other smaller streams and the municipal territory is rich fishponds, supplied by these streams. The most numerous set of fishponds is built on the stream Rybniční potok.

== History ==
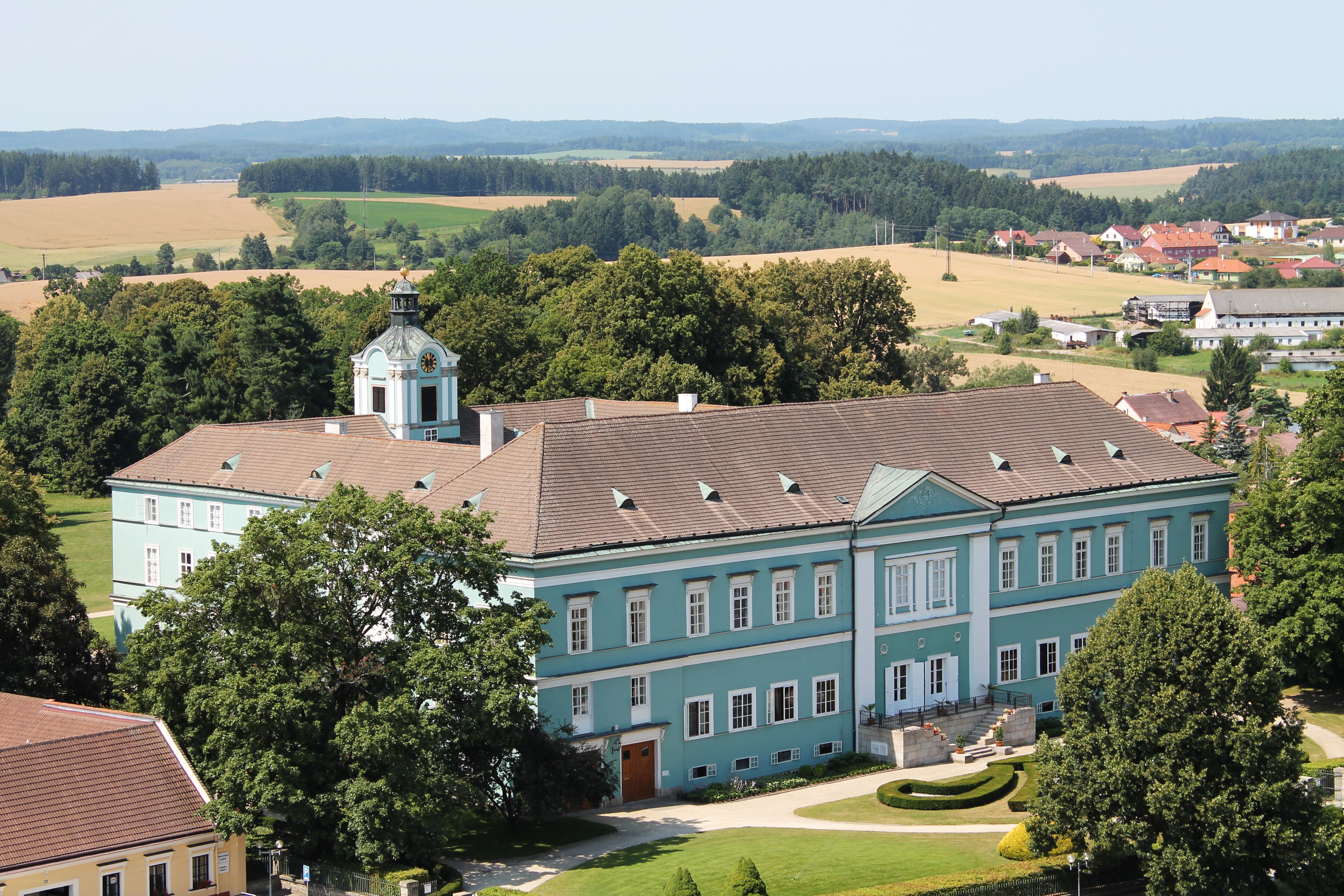
Dačice Castle

The first written mention of Dačice is from 1183, when it was a settlement on crossroads of two trade routes. In 1377, Dačice was promoted to a town.

After Dačice was acquired by the family of Krajíř of Krajek in 1459, the town has experienced rapid development. In the 16th century, Krajíř invited Italian architects to the town and turned the simple Gothic town into a Renaissance one. The new town hall, two castles, new quarter around the castle, and the tower of the church were built. The Baroque era has been shown in 1660 by construction of Franciscan monastery, and in 1672–1677, when the Church of Saint Anthony of Padua was built next to the monastery.

Dačice suffered by a plague in 1680, and by extensive fire and several smaller fires, which caused destruction of Renaissance and Baroque look of the town. In the 19th century, the town was industrialised. In 1833, the first sugar refinery in Moravia was founded. In 1902, the town was connected with Telč and Slavonice by railway.

== Demographics ==
Historical population

Year	Pop.	±%
1869	4,656	—
1880	4,866	+4.5%
1890	5,002	+2.8%
1900	5,253	+5.0%
1910	5,232	−0.4%

Year	Pop.	±%
1921	5,086	−2.8%
1930	4,743	−6.7%
1950	5,015	+5.7%
1961	5,080	+1.3%
1970	6,149	+21.0%

Year	Pop.	±%
1980	7,394	+20.2%
1991	7,970	+7.8%
2001	7,937	−0.4%
2011	7,492	−5.6%
2021	7,022	−6.3%

Source: Censuses

== Economy ==
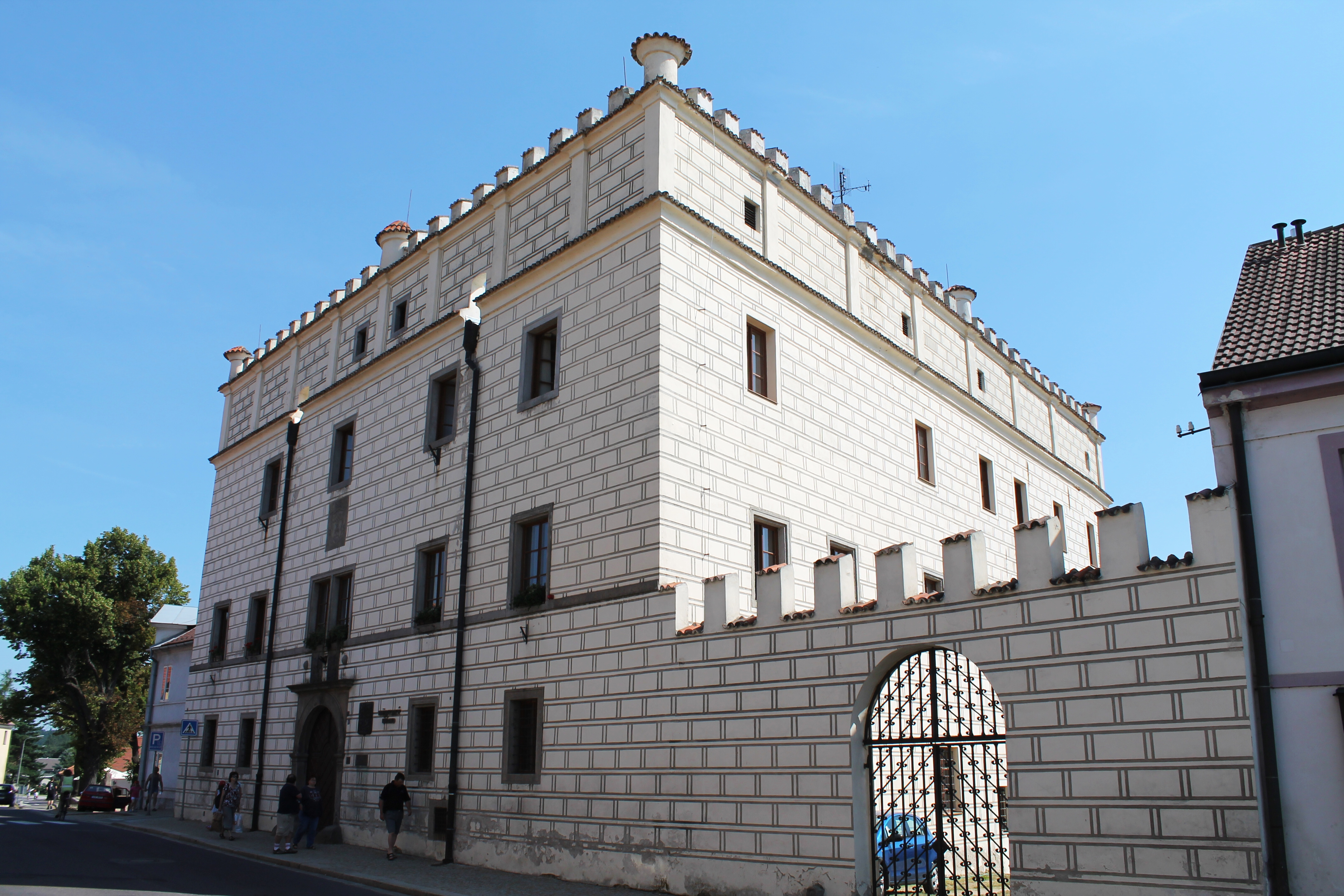
Old Castle, nowadays part of the municipal office

THK Rhythm Automotive Czech, part of the THK concern that produces parts for motor vehicles, is by far the largest employer in the town and one of the largest in the region.

== Transport ==
Dačice is located on the railway line heading from Havlíčkův Brod to Slavonice. The town is served by four train stations and stops.

== Sights ==
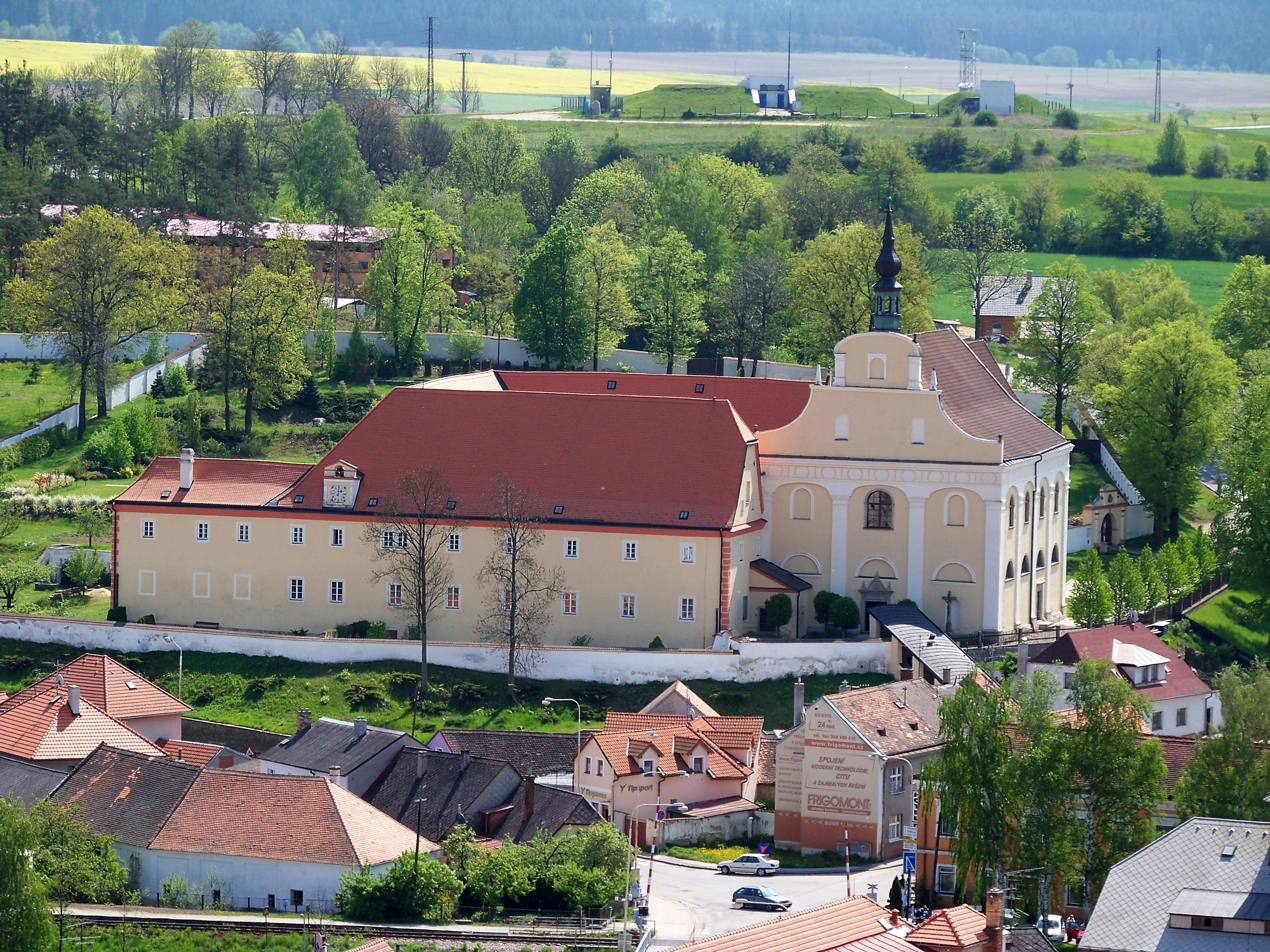
Monastery complex

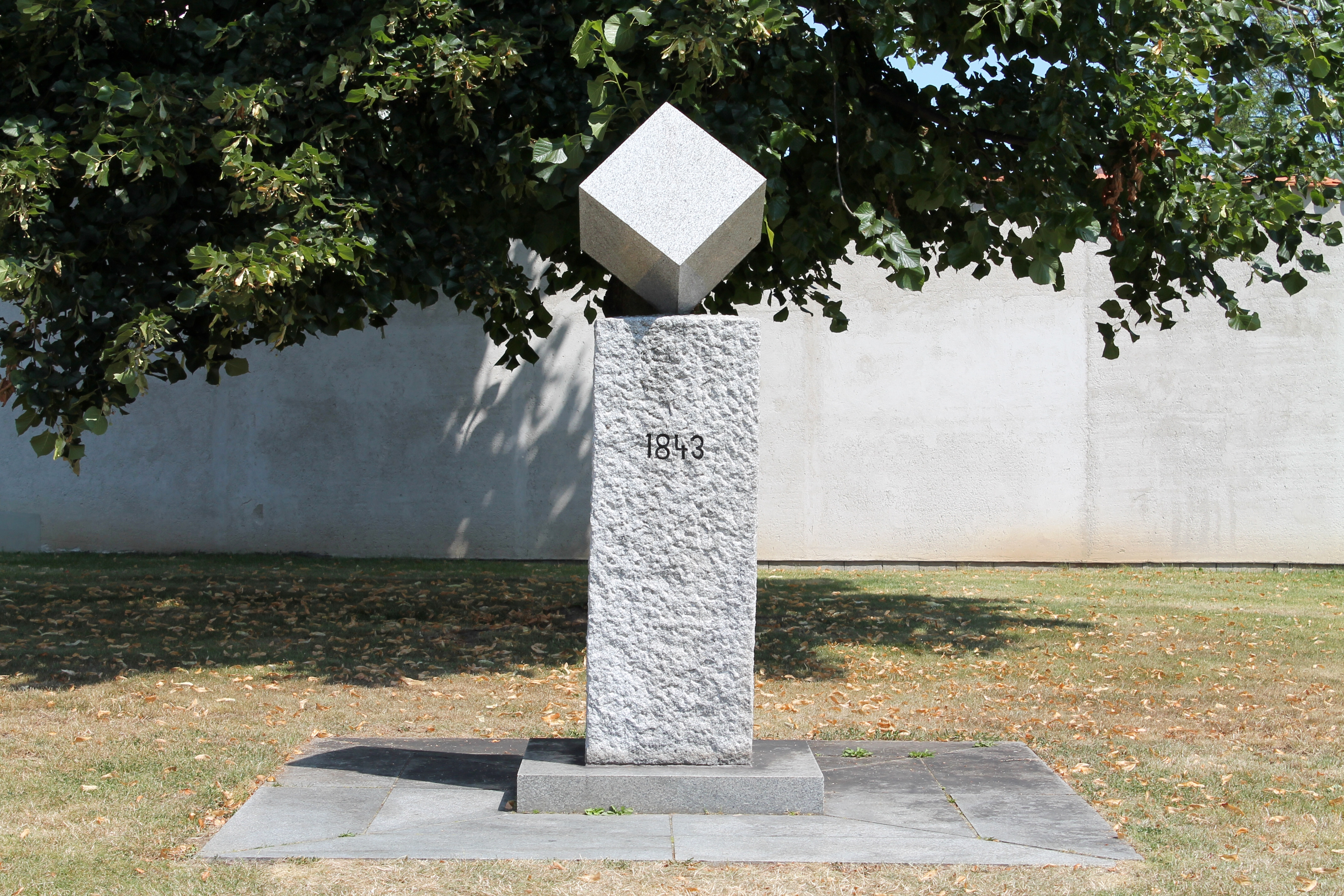
Monument of sugar cube

The monastery complex with the Church of Saint Anthony of Padua, and the Church of Saint Lawrence are the most valuable preserved Baroque monuments and the main landmarks of the town. The monastery is still active and inaccessible for the public.

The Old Castle was built in 1572–1579 and served as the manor house until 1591, when the New Castle was built. The Old Castle now houses part of the municipal office. The Renaissance town hall is the most significant house of the square and still serves its original purpose. The New Castle, nowadays called Dačice Castle, was rebuilt in the 19th century from Renaissance to the current Empire form, and today it is open to visitors. It also includes a 10 ha (25 acres) large English-style landscape park.

The invention of the sugar cube is the subject of a permanent exhibition in the Municipal Museum and Art Gallery, which is located in the southern wing of the Dačice Castle. In the town centre there is also a granite monument commemorating this event.

== Notable people ==
- Jakob Christof Rad (1799–1871), Austrian businessman, inventor of the sugar cube; lived and worked here
- Miloš Vystrčil (born 1960), politician
- Jan Štokr (born 1983), volleyball player
- Eduard Kubelík (born 2002), athlete

== Twin towns – sister cities ==
Dačice is twinned with:

- Groß-Siegharts, Austria
- Urtenen-Schönbühl, Switzerland
