= Law of the Czech Republic =

Czech law, often referred to as the legal order of the Czech Republic (právní řád České republiky), is the system of legal rules in force in the Czech Republic, and in the international community it is a member of. Czech legal system belongs to the Germanic branch of continental legal culture (civil law). Major areas of public and private law are divided into branches, among them civil, criminal, administrative, procedural and labour law, and systematically codified.

Written law is the basis of the legal order, and the most important source of law are: legal regulations (acts of parliament, as well as delegated legislation), international treaties (once they have been ratified by the parliament and promulgated), and such findings of the Constitutional Court of the Czech Republic, in which a statute or its part has been nullified as unconstitutional. It is made public by the periodically published Sbírka zákonů, abbreviated Sb. (“Collection of Law”, “Coll.”), and Sbírka mezinárodních smluv, abbreviated Sb. m. s. (“Collection of International Treaties”).

The system of law and justice in the Czech Republic has been in constant development since the 1989 regime change. In 1993, the Constitution of the Czech Republic has been enacted, which postulates the rule of law, outlines the structure and principles of democratic government, and declares human rights and rights of the citizen. Since 2004, the membership in the EU means the priority of European Union law over Czech law in some areas. Recently, a brand new Criminal Code entered into force in 2010, and the Civil Code followed in 2014.

== Sources of law ==
Sources of Czech law are (in this hierarchical order):

- the Constitution (Ústava) and constitutional acts (ústavní zákony)
- international treaties ratified by the Parliament (mezinárodní smlouvy ratifikované parlamentem)
- statutes adopted by the Parliament (zákony přijaté parlamentem), published decisions of the Constitutional Court
- derived legislation: government orders (nařízení vlády) and notifications of ministries (vyhlášky ministerstev); legislative acts of territorial self-government bodies: regional ordinances (krajské vyhlášky) and municipal ordinances (obecní vyhlášky)

Acts of parliament and other legal regulations enter into force on the day they are promulgated (published) in the official Collection of Law (Sbírka zákonů, abbreviated as Sb. – Coll. – when referring to statutes), although they may take effect at a later date. International treaties are similarly published in the Collection of International Treaties (Sbírka mezinárodních smluv, abbreviated Sb. m. s.).

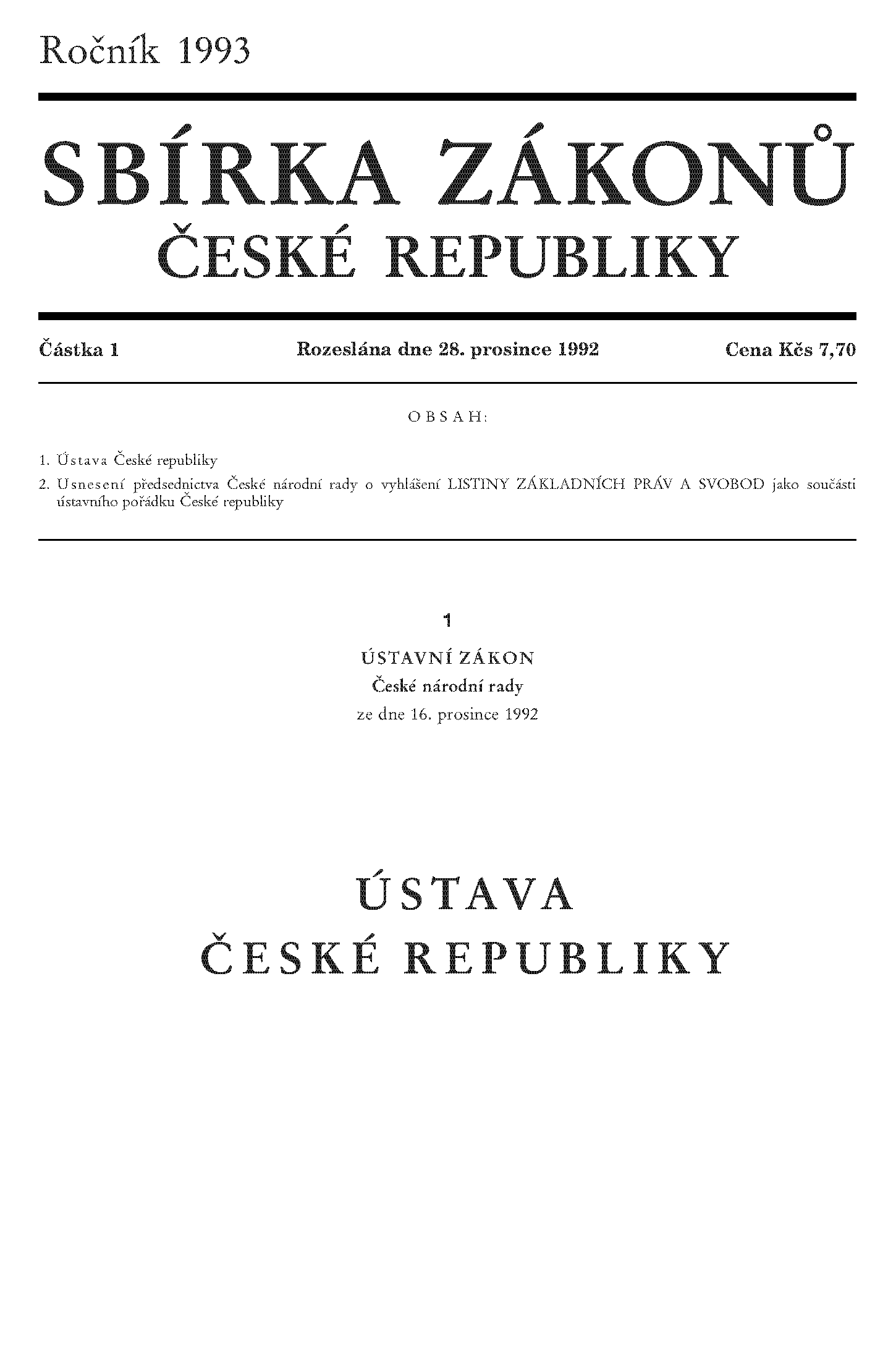
The Constitution of the Czech Republic as published in the Collection of Laws

=== Constitutional law ===
Czech constitution is written, and it consists of several constitutional acts (one of them the Constitution of the Czech Republic), together they are known as the constitutional order of the Czech Republic (ústavní pořádek).

The constitution can be viewed as entrenched, because constitutional statutes are more difficult to adopt, amend, supplement or repeal them than ordinary laws of the country. A special majority (constitutional supermajority) is required of three-fifths of all Deputies and a qualified majority of three-fifths of all Senators present. This is to promote continuity and stability of the political system.

Most important constitutional acts are:

- Constitutional Act No. 1/1993 Coll. the Constitution of the Czech Republic
- Resolution No. 2/1993 Coll. [...] incorporating Charter of Fundamental Rights and Basic Freedoms [...]
- Constitutional Act No. 110/1998 Coll. on the Security of the Czech Republic
- Constitutional Act No. 347/1997 Coll. on the Creation of Higher Territorial Self-Governing Units

The 1992 Constitution of the Czech Republic declares sovereignty (self-government) of the people and the values of freedom and democracy. It defines the separation of the three powers in a system of Checks and balances. It gives the legislative power to the popularly elected Czech Parliament consisting of two chambers, the Chamber of Deputies and the Senate. The executive power is divided between the President and the Prime Minister. It describes the functioning of the judiciary, especially the Constitutional Court. Two more institutions are established, the Czech National Bank and the Supreme Audit Office.

The Charter of Fundamental Rights and Basic Freedoms (Listina základních práv a svobod) is a bill of rights document enacted in 1991 by the Czechoslovak Federative Republic. In the Czech Republic it was kept in its entirety and forms a part of the constitutional order (i.e. has the same legal force as the Constitution). It postulates the sanctity of natural human rights and fundamental freedoms as well as citizens' (political) rights, the equality before the law, rights of minorities and so on.

The Constitution has been seriously modified in February 2012, introducing a controversial popular vote of the President of the Czech Republic:

- Constitutional Act No. 71/2012 Coll.

=== International treaties ===
On joining the European Union, the Czech Republic committed itself to respect the principle of the supremacy of European law over Czech law in defined areas.

The most important treaty in this category is the Council of Europe’s Convention for the Protection of Human Rights and Fundamental Freedoms.

=== Statutes adopted by the Parliament ===
Major areas of Czech law are codified in a systematic manner.

==== Criminal law ====
Most important statutes in the criminal justice field are:

- Act No. 40/2009 Coll., the Criminal Code
- Act No. 141/1961 Coll., the Criminal Procedure Code
- Act No. 218/2003 Coll., on Juvenile Criminal Justice

Since 2010, Czech criminal law is regulated mainly, though not only, by the Criminal Code Act 2009 (trestní zákoník), which codifies substantive criminal law. The comprehensive regulatory statute for criminal procedure is the Criminal Proceedings Code Act 1961 (trestní řád). The two codes are complemented by the Juvenile Criminal Justice Act 2003, which deals with alleged offenders aged between 15 (the threshold of criminal liability as well as age of legal consent) and 17.

Until 2009, the criminal code statute in force dated back to 1961. In spite of numerous amendments made since 1989, it still conformed to the communist ideology, oriented on punishment of perceived enemies of the socialist regime. As a part of an effort to comprehensively reform law and justice, a brand new codification has been written. The Ministry of Justice announced it as an "elaborate piece of work boiled down from the experience and knowledge of foremost expert on criminal law", which can be proudly compared to modern criminal codes of other democratic countries.

The purpose of the 2009 codification was to bring the criminal justice system in line with the rest of Europe. The main change introduced by the code was transition from material to formal conception of criminal offence. Another thing the lawyers drafting the 2009 code had in mind, and expressed it in the area of sentencing tariffs, was a new balance of punishment against rehabilitation effect on the criminal. On one hand we see the sentences for felony (zločin) which carry a sentence of at least 5 years. On the other a newly created category of misdemeanour (přečin) introduces a host of community sentences (alternativní tresty), including community payback (veřejně prospěšné práce) or house arrest (domácí vězení). The code also outlaws doping.

Less serious breaches of law are called contraventions (přestupek). These are not normally dealt with by the courts of law, but rather punished either by the police on the spot, or through a procedure in front of a committee at the local or municipal authority, or sometimes other administration body. The result is not a conviction, and so such a punishment will not blemish the culprit's criminal record. Like with other administrative acts, the outcome of this procedure can be challenged through the administrative justice process. A typical example of contraventions in Czech law this are driving offences. (In the common law world, acts falling into this category would be classed as summary offences.)

- Act No. 200/1990 on Contraventions

Since 2012, Czech law also recognizes criminal liability of corporations for offences committed by employees of a corporation, when acting on its behalf, being instructed by the board of directors or other representative of the company, or through lack of their action. In such cases, not only individuals will be prosecuted, but the corporation can be prosecuted as well for the same offence and punished by a host of measures, starting from certain injunctions, through fines a forfeitures, to liquidation of the company.

- Act No. 418/2011 Coll., on Criminal Liability of Legal Persons and the Proceedings against Them

==== Civil law ====
Main statutes regulating this area are:

- Act No. 89/2012 Coll. the Civil Code (Note: Zákon č. 89/2012 Sb. občanský zákoník)
- Act No. 99/1963 Coll. the Civil Procedure Code
- Act No. 500/2004 Coll. the Administrative Procedure Code (Note: Zákon č. 500/2004 Sb. správní řád)

The Civil Code codifies core areas of private law. It has five parts. The first part is dedicated to a legal status of a person as an individual. The second regulates family law – e.g. the institute of marriage and the rights and obligations of husband and wife, parents and children. Although the Code does include registered partnership, it explicitly prohibits adoption to a person in a registered partnership. The rest in concerned mainly with property rights.

The civil code regulation effective since 1 January 2014 is a result of eleven years of work of the recodification committee of the Ministry of Justice. Together with the Commercial Corporations Act and the Private International Law Act it constitutes a complete recodification of private law in the Czech Republic. It brings new and modern regulation of relations governed by civil law, with emphasis on personality rights, free will / more choice when writing a will or unified regulation of obligation laws.

=== Case law ===
Theoretically, case law is not defined as a source of law in the Czech Republic. Despite that, the decisions of courts, namely supreme courts and the Constitutional Court, have a significant influence over the Czech legal system since 1989. Findings of the Constitutional Court are considered a source of law, and are binding for general courts. If a lower court is to rule against "consistent adjudications" of the Supreme Court on the point of law, it must give detailed reasoning, and this can often be a reason for a successful appeal. This system is largely based on judiciary's own interpretation of the Constitution, arguing that it gives citizens predictability and fairness. The most significant judgements of both courts are published in the official Collection of Laws.

== History ==
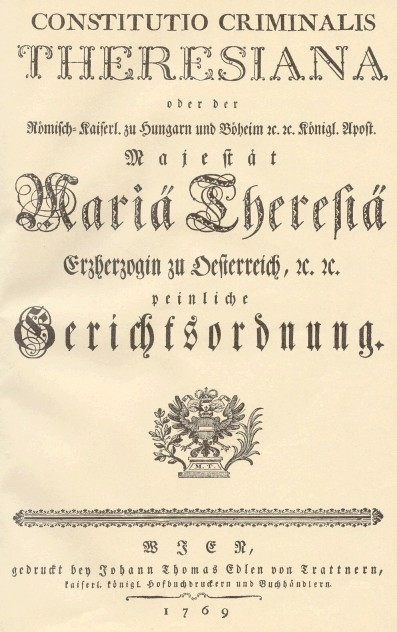
Constitutio Criminalis Theresiana, 1768

In Czech lands, the process of 'codification' dates back to the era of enlightened absolutism, when they were a core part of the Austrian Empire. Reforms of government were to a large extent the work of empress Maria Theresa and her son Joseph II, who participated in creating the first civil code of the country in 1787, called Josephinisches Gesetzbuch. This was a forebear of the comprehensive codification of civil law in 1811, known as the Allgemeines bürgerliches Gesetzbuch (ABGB). ABGB was received in 1918 by Czechoslovakia, among other successor states, but only for Czech lands (Bohemia, Moravia and Austrian Silesia), while Slovakia kept the customary law of Hungary. Albeit updated many times, this Austrian law was kept in Czechoslovakia, along with the legal duality, until 1950, when the "Middle Civil Code" was promulgated, soon to be superseded by the civil code of 1964, which was in force until the "New Civil Code", enacted in 2009, entered into force in 2014.

Following in the tracks of their enlightenment predecessors, the Constitutio criminalis Josephina of 1707 and the Constitutio criminalis Theresiana of 1768, the most important Czechoslovak criminal codes were enacted in 1950, 1961 and 2009.

The history of Czechoslovak constitutionality starts with the formation of independent Czechoslovakia out of the ruins of Austria-Hungary. In 1918, the Interim Constitution of Czechoslovakia has been enacted hastily, establishing the republic with its president and temporary parliament. The Czechoslovak Constitution of 1920 succeeded it, inspired by western democratic constitutions, and, controversially, postulating the Czechoslovak nation. This lasted over the First Republic and the second world war. In 1948, the so-called Ninth-of-May Constitution was enacted after the communist coup – putiatively some democratic institutions and nominal human rights, and even notions of, for example an "independent" judiciary though the political reality of the country departed from it radically. The 1960 Constitution of Czechoslovakia, influenced by soviet constitutions, is often dubbed the "Socialist Constitution". It changed the name of the country to Czechoslovak Socialist Republic and defined socialist, rather than democratic, character of the state, and introduced the leading role of the Communist Party of Czechoslovakia. The 1960 constitution remained in force until 1992, although in 1968 it was substantially modified by the Constitutional Act on the Czechoslovak Federation – this transformed the unitary state into a federation of the Czech Socialist Republic and the Slovak Socialist Republic. Further radical modifications were enacted after the regime change of 1989, but they turned out to be short-lived, as in 1992 the Constitution of the Czech Republic has been promulgated after the division of Czechoslovakia, and entered into force in 1993.

== Sources and further reading ==
=== Literature ===
- Karabec, Z., J. Vlach, S. Diblíková, and P. Zeman. Criminal Justice System in the Czech Republic. Prague: Institute of Criminology and Social Prevention, 2011. Print. Sources. ISBN 978-80-7338-111-0

=== External links ===
- National Labour Law Profile: The Czech Republic maintained by International Labour Organization
- Czech Laws in English (Zákony anglicky). – a collection of unofficial translations of Czech statutes (of varying quality) maintained by a professional translator
- (in Czech) Vyhledávání v zákonech – an official online collection of Czech states published by the Czech government
