= Politics of the Czech Republic =

- Coat of Arms of the Czech Republic
- Polity type: Unitary parliamentary republic
- Constitution: Constitution of the Czech Republic
- Formation: 1 January 1993

Legislative branch
- Name: Parliament of the Czech Republic
- Type: Bicameral
- Meeting place: Wallenstein Palace; Thun Palace
- Upper house
- Name: Senate
- Presiding officer: Miloš Vystrčil, President of the Senate
- Lower house
- Name: Chamber of Deputies
- Presiding officer: Tomio Okamura, President of the Chamber of Deputies

Executive branch
- Head of state
- Title: President
- Currently: Petr Pavel
- Appointer: Direct popular vote, two-round system
- Head of government
- Title: Prime Minister
- Currently: Andrej Babiš
- Appointer: Chamber of Deputies
- Cabinet
- Name: Cabinet of the Czech Republic
- Current cabinet: Third cabinet of Andrej Babiš
- Leader: Prime Minister
- Headquarters: Straka Academy, Prague
- Ministries: Ministerial departments

Judicial branch
- Name: Judiciary
- Constitutional Court
- Seat: Joštova 625, Brno
- Supreme Court
- Seat: Burešova 20, Brno
- Supreme Administrative Court
- Seat: Moravské náměstí 6, Brno

The Czech Republic is a unitary parliamentary republic, in which the president is the head of state and the prime minister is the head of government. Executive power is exercised by the Government of the Czech Republic, which reports to the Chamber of Deputies. The legislature is exercised by the Parliament. The Czech Parliament is bicameral: the upper house of the Parliament is the Senate, and the lower house is the Chamber of Deputies. The Senate consists of 81 members who are elected for six years. The Chamber of Deputies consists of 200 members who are elected for four years. The judiciary system is topped by the trio of the Constitutional Court, Supreme Court and Supreme Administrative Court.

The highest legal document is the Constitution of the Czech Republic, complemented by constitutional laws and the Charter of Fundamental Rights and Freedoms. The current constitution went in effect on 1 January 1993, after the dissolution of Czechoslovakia.

The Czech Republic has a multi-party system. Between 1993 and 2013, the two largest political parties were the centre-left Czech Social Democratic Party (ČSSD) and centre-right Civic Democratic Party (ODS). This changed in early 2014, with the rise of a new major political party ANO 2011, which has since led two cabinets.

The Economist Intelligence Unit rated Czech Republic a "full democracy" in 2024. According to the V-Dem Democracy indices, the Czech Republic was in 2023 the 16th-most electoral democratic country in the world.

== Executive branch ==
The president is the head of state, and the prime minister is the head of government. The majority of executive power is given to the Cabinet, which consists of the prime minister, deputy prime ministers and ministers (usually heads of the ministries).

Main office-holders
Office	Name	Party	Since
President	Petr Pavel	Independent	9 March 2023
Prime Minister	Andrej Babiš	ANO 2011	9 December 2025

=== President ===
The president of the Czech Republic is elected by a direct vote for five years. They can only serve for two terms. The president is a formal head of state with limited executive powers specified in the articles 54 to 66 of the Constitution:

- to appoint or dismiss the prime minister and other members of the Cabinet
- to appoint or dismiss the entire Cabinet
- to confirm or decline a resignation of the prime minister and other members of the Cabinet
- to summon a session of the Chamber of Deputies
- to dissolve the Chamber of Deputies when specific conditions described in the Constitution are met
- to pardon and mitigate penalties imposed by the court, order not to initiate criminal proceedings, suspend them if they are already initiated and to wipe previous criminal records
- to declare the date of elections to the Chamber of Deputies and the Senate
- to bestow state honors
- to appoint and promote generals
- to appoint judges
- to appoint the president and vice-president of the Supreme Audit Office
- to appoint members of the Board of the Czech National Bank
- to appoint or dismiss heads of diplomatic missions

The president is also the commander in chief of the Armed Forces and ratifies all domestic laws and international agreements.

=== Cabinet ===
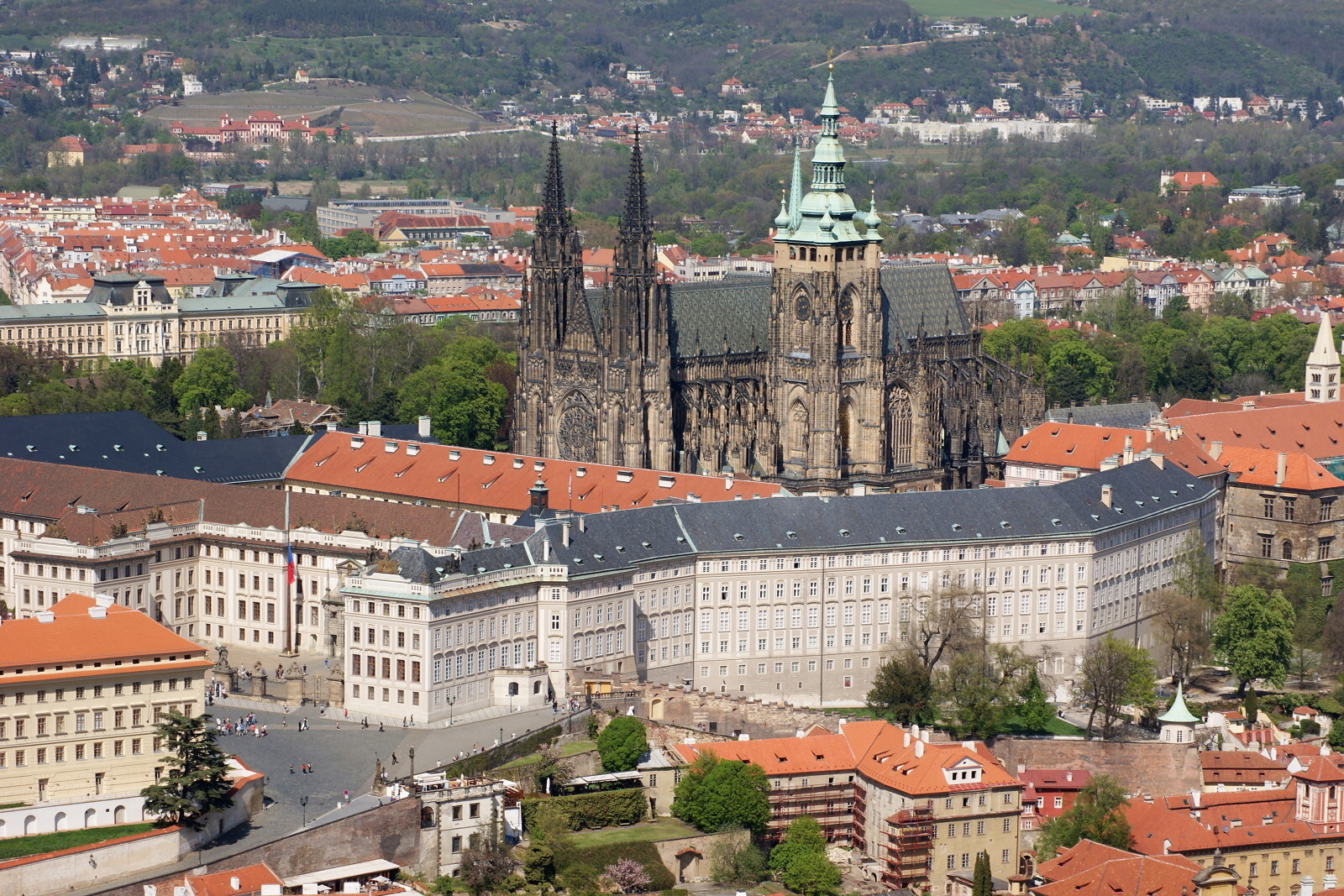
Prague Castle, the seat of the president of the Czech Republic

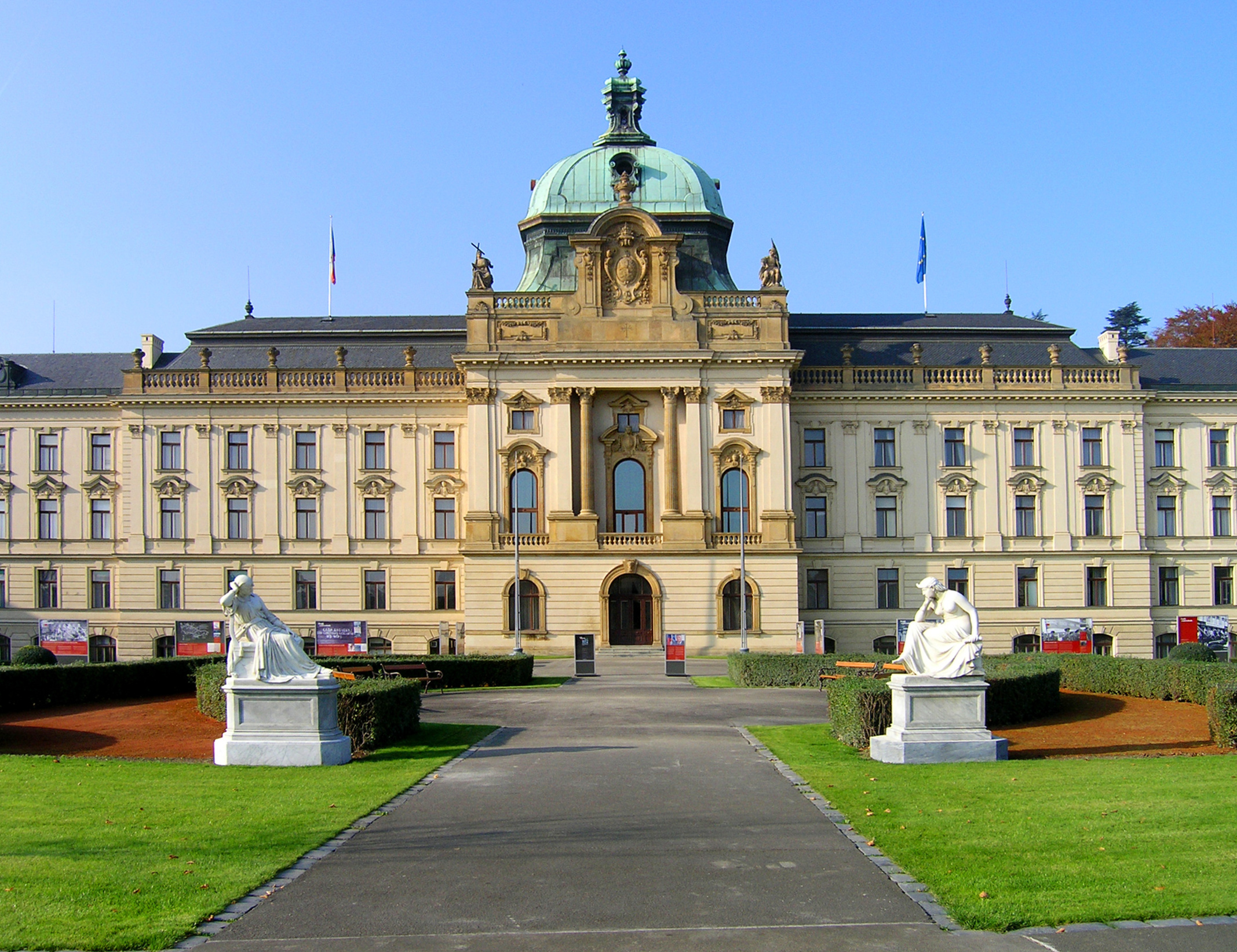
Straka Academy, the seat of the Cabinet, Prague

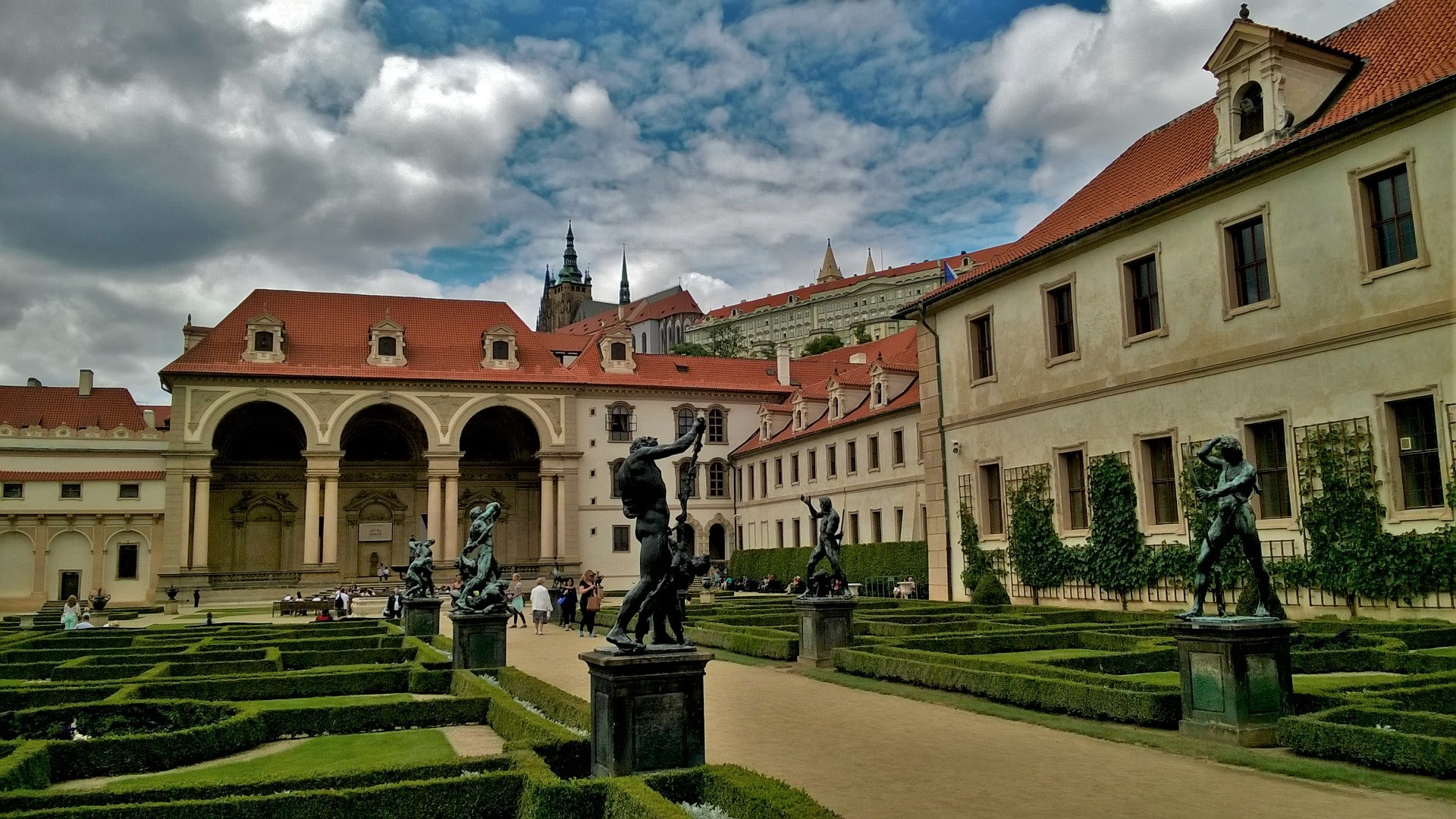
Wallenstein Palace, the seat of the Senate, Prague

The Cabinet is the supreme executive body in the Czech Republic. It makes its decisions as a body. It is held responsible by the Chamber of Deputies. The president appoints every new prime minister, who then chooses the ministers. All ministers of the Cabinet need to be approved by the president and within thirty days after the presidential approval they must ask the Chamber of Deputies for a vote of confidence.

==== Prime minister ====
The prime minister is the head of government. The prime minister organizes the work of the Cabinet, presides over it and acts in its name. The prime minister sets the agenda for most foreign and domestic policies but has to obtain the president's approval to hire or dismiss any other member of the Cabinet.

==== Ministers ====
A minister is any member of the Cabinet who is not the prime minister. They are usually the head of a ministry, but this is not required. A ministry – sometimes called government department – is a governmental organisation that manages a specific sector of public administration. The number of ministries varies depending on the particular Cabinet and is managed by the Competence Law. As of 2021, the Czech Republic had 13 ministers and 14 ministries.

== Legislative branch ==
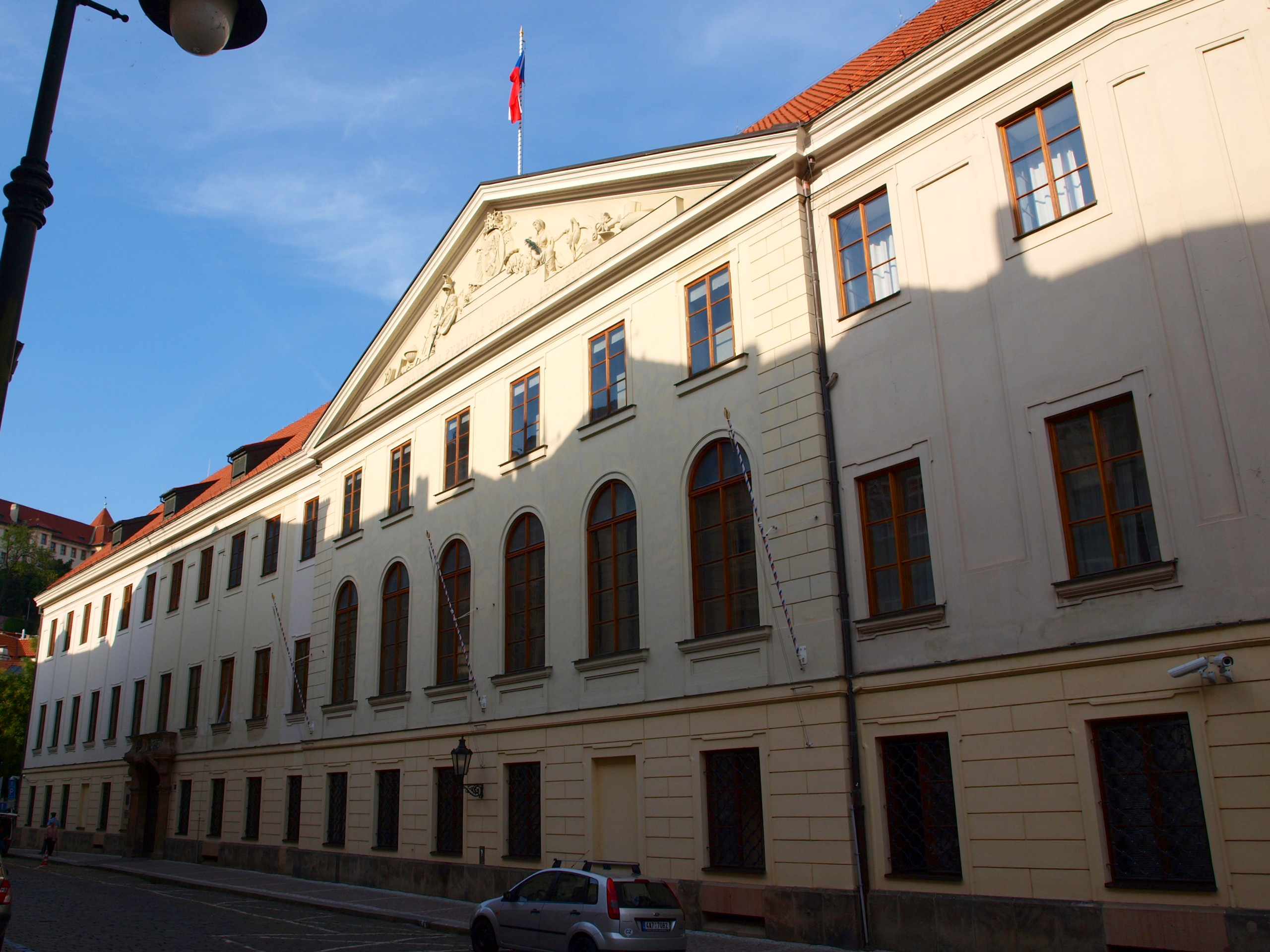
Thun Palace, the seat of the Chamber of Deputies, Prague

The Parliament (Parlament in Czech) consists of two houses. The lower house is the Chamber of Deputies, and the upper house is the Senate.

Main office-holders
Office	Name	Party	Since
President of the Chamber of Deputies	Tomio Okamura	Freedom and Direct Democracy	5 November 2025
President of the Senate	Miloš Vystrčil	Civic Democratic Party	19 February 2020

=== Chamber of Deputies ===
The Chamber of Deputies (Poslanecká sněmovna in Czech) has 200 members, elected for four-year terms by proportional representation with a 5% election threshold. The Chamber of Deputies elections happen every four years, unless the reigning Cabinet prematurely loses the Chamber of Deputies' support. Candidates for every political party participating in the elections are split among 14 electoral districts, which are identical to the country's administrative regions. A citizen must be at least 21 years old to be eligible for candidacy.

The Chamber of Deputies was formerly known as the Czech National Council. It has the same powers and responsibilities as the now-defunct Federal Assembly of the Czechoslovakia.

=== Senate ===
The Senate (Senát in Czech) has 81 members, each elected for a six-year term. Senate elections happen every two years and only a third of the seats is contested each time. All of the 81 Senate electoral districts are designed to contain roughly the same number of voters. The Senate elections use a two-round system, when the two most successful candidates from the first round face each other again in the second round usually a week later. Only citizens who have reached the age of 40 are eligible for candidacy. The senate's function is to be a stabilizing force and its influence is significantly lower than that of the Chamber of Deputies.

== Judicial branch ==
The Czech court system recognizes four categories of courts and the Constitutional Court, which stands outside of the court system.

=== Constitutional Court ===
The Constitutional Court's main purpose is to protect people's constitutional rights and freedoms. The decisions of the court are final, cannot be overturned and are considered a source of law. The court is composed of 15 justices who are named for a renewable period of 10 years by the president and approved by the Senate. Its functionality is similar to that of the Supreme Court of the United States.

=== Supreme courts ===
There are two supreme courts in the court system of the Czech Republic: the Supreme Court and the Supreme Administrative Court. Both reside in Brno.

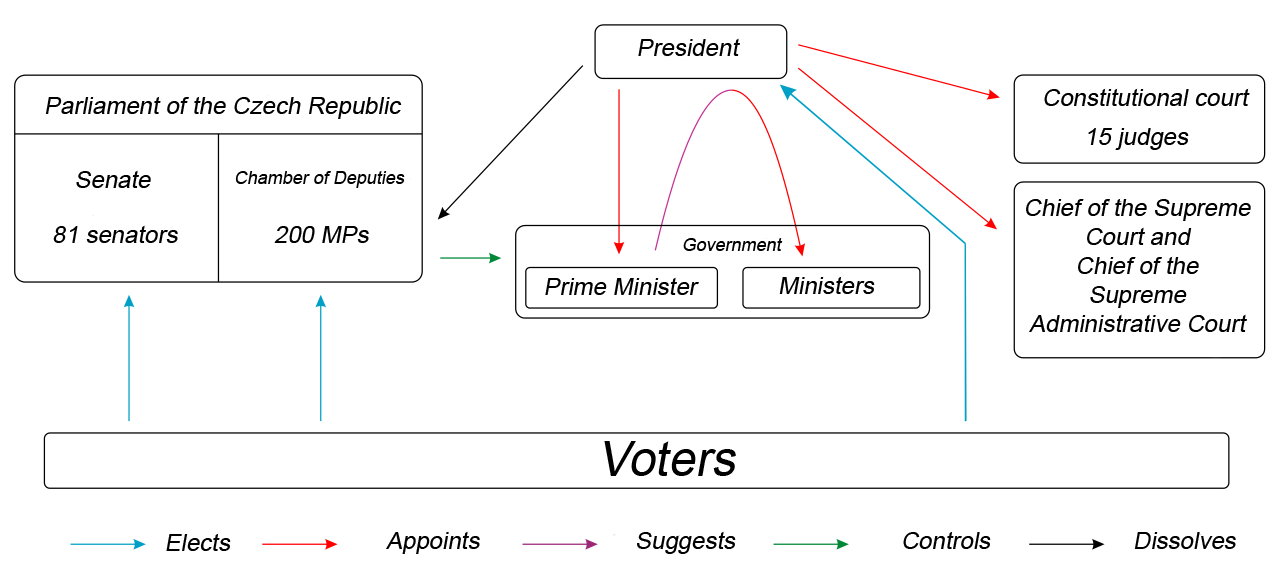
Simplified chart of the Czech political system

==== Supreme Court ====
The Supreme Court of the Czech Republic is the court of highest appeal for almost all legal cases heard in the Czech Republic. The justices of the Supreme Court analyze and evaluate legally effective decisions of lower courts. They unify the Czech judicature.

==== Supreme Administrative Court ====
The Supreme Administrative Court of the Czech Republic hears cases regarding unlawful decisions and procedures of state authorities. It examines objections to elections and has the authority to ban or suspend the activity of political parties. It resolves competence disputes between governmental organizations and also serves as disciplinary court for other members of the judiciary.

=== High courts ===
There are two high courts in the Czech Republic – one in Prague, the other in Olomouc. They serve as courts of appeal to Regional Courts in cases where the Regional Court acted as a court of first instance. Presidents of the high courts are appointed by the president for seven years. Vice-presidents are appointed by the minister of justice and also serve a seven-year term. A justice is required by law to have at least eight years of experience before becoming a member of a High Court.

=== Regional courts ===
Regional courts serve mainly as the courts of appeal to district courts and also as the only other administrative court beyond the Supreme Administrative Court. They can also act as courts of first instance in cases of more severe criminal charges, disputes between corporations, or disputes over intellectual property. There are eight regional courts in the Czech Republic. These courts are located in Brno, Ostrava, Hradec Králové, Ústí nad Labem, Plzeň, and České Budějovice, alongside two in Prague.

=== District courts ===
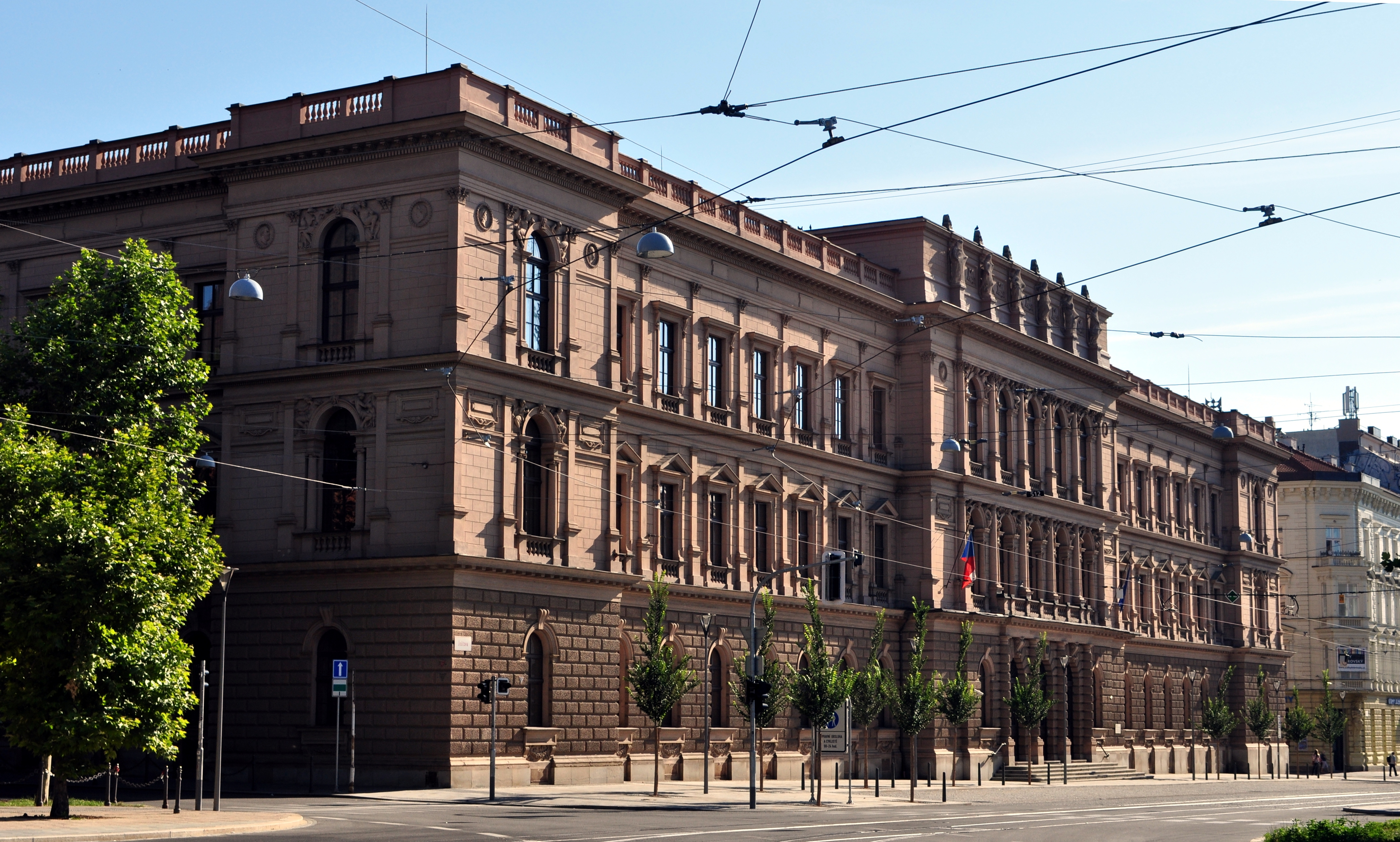
Seat of the Constitutional Court, Brno

District courts serve as the courts of first instance in almost all civil or criminal proceedings. There are a total of 86 district courts in the Czech Republic. Notaries and executors are appointed by the minister of justice to their jurisdictions.

== Regional government ==
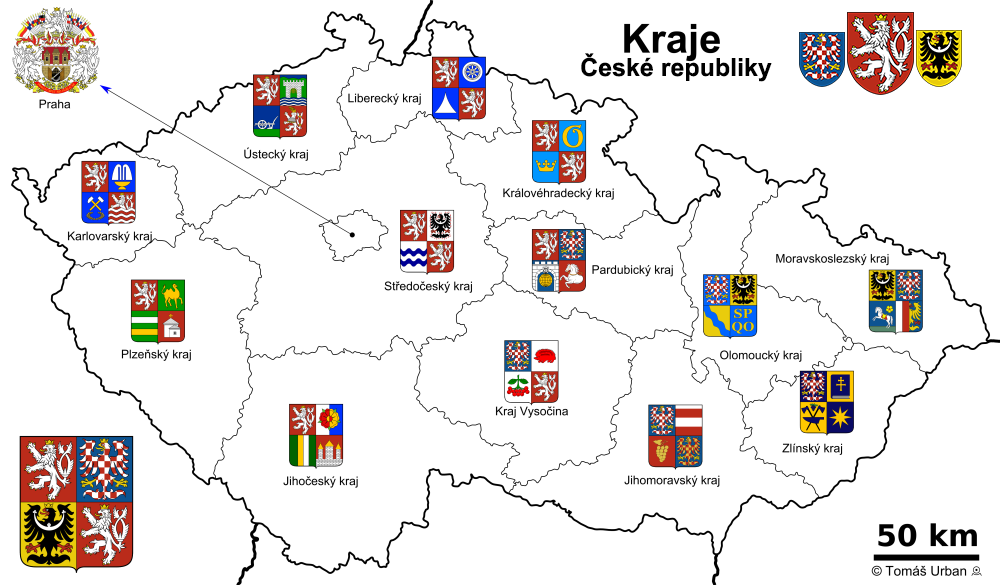
Regions of the Czech Republic with their coats of arms

The Czech Republic is divided in 14 administrative regions, including one for the capital Prague. The older system of 73 administrative districts (okresy in Czech) and 4 municipalities was abandoned in 1999 in an administrative reform. Each of the regions has a regional council with a varied number of regional councilors and a president of the regional cabinet (hejtman in Czech) as its formal head. The capital of Prague is the only exception to this, as the City Council acts both as regional and municipal governing body and led by a mayor. Regional councilors are elected for four-year terms similarly to deputies in the Chamber of Deputies. All adults eligible to vote are also eligible to be a candidate to a regional council.

== Composition of the Senate ==
For the current composition of the Chamber of Deputies of the Czech Republic, see List of MPs elected in the 2017 Czech legislative election.

Composition of the Senate of the Czech Republic
Party	Seats			
Party	2016 (Note: Includes the 2017 re-run in constituency 4)	2018	2020	TOTAL
Mayors and Independents	3	5	11	19 / 81
Civic Democratic Party	3	10	5	18 / 81
Christian and Democratic Union – Czechoslovak People's Party	7	2	3	12 / 81
ANO 2011	3	1	1	5 / 81
TOP 09	2	1	2	5 / 81
Czech Social Democratic Party	2	1	—	3 / 81
Senator 21	—	1	2	3 / 81
Czech Pirate Party	—	1	1	2 / 81
Green Party	1	—	—	1 / 81
Svobodní	—	—	1	1 / 81
Severočeši.cz	1	—	—	1 / 81
Ostravak Movement	—	1	—	1 / 81
Hradec Králové Democratic Club	—	—	1	1 / 81
Movement for Prague 11	1	—	—	1 / 81
Marek Hilšer for Senate	—	1	—	1 / 81
United Democrats — Association of Independents	1	—	—	1 / 81
Citizens Together — Independents	1	—	—	1 / 81
Citizens Patriots	1	—	—	1 / 81
Independents	1	3	—	4 / 81
Total	27	27	27	81
Sources: Senate, cs:Volby do Senátu Parlamentu České republiky 2016, cs:Volby do Senátu Parlamentu České republiky 2018; Volby.cz, cs:Volby do Senátu Parlamentu České republiky 2020, Constituencies in which the election was held: 2016: 1, 4, 7, 10, 13, 16, 19, 22, 25, 28, 31, 34, 37, 40, 43, 46, 49, 52, 55, 58, 61, 64, 67, 70, 73, 76, 79; 2018: 2, 5, 8, 11, 14, 17, 20, 23, 26, 29, 32, 35, 38, 41, 44, 47, 50, 53, 56, 59, 62, 65, 68, 71, 74, 77, 80; 2020: 3, 6, 9, 12, 15, 18, 21, 24, 27, 30, 33, 36, 39, 42, 45, 48, 51, 54, 57, 60, 63, 66, 69, 72, 75, 78, 81

== Recent political developments ==
From 1991, the Czech Republic, originally as part of Czechoslovakia and since 1993 in its own right, has been a member of the Visegrád Group and from 1995, the OECD. The Czech Republic joined NATO on 12 March 1999 and the European Union on 1 May 2004. On 21 December 2007 the Czech Republic joined the Schengen Area.

Until 2017, either the Czech Social Democratic Party or the Civic Democratic Party had led the governments of the Czech Republic. In October 2017, the right-wing populist movement ANO 2011, led by the country's second-richest man, Andrej Babiš, who won the election with three times the vote of his closest rival, the centre-right Civic Democrats. In December 2017, Czech President Miloš Zeman appointed Andrej Babiš as the new prime minister.

On 28 November 2021, Czech President Miloš Zeman appointed opposition leader Petr Fiala as the country's new prime minister. The centre-right coalition Spolu (meaning Together) won tightly contested legislative elections in October 2021 against Prime Minister Andrej Babiš and his ANO party. In January 2023, Former NATO general Petr Pavel won the election runoff over Andrej Babiš to succeed Miloš Zeman as the fourth president of the Czech Republic. In December 2025, Babis returned as the Czech Republic's new prime minister, following the ANO party's win in the October parliamentary election.

== See also ==
- Government of the Czech Republic
- Ministry of Finance (Czech Republic)
