= Supreme Administrative Court of the Czech Republic =

Coordinates: 49.1975°N 16.6067°E

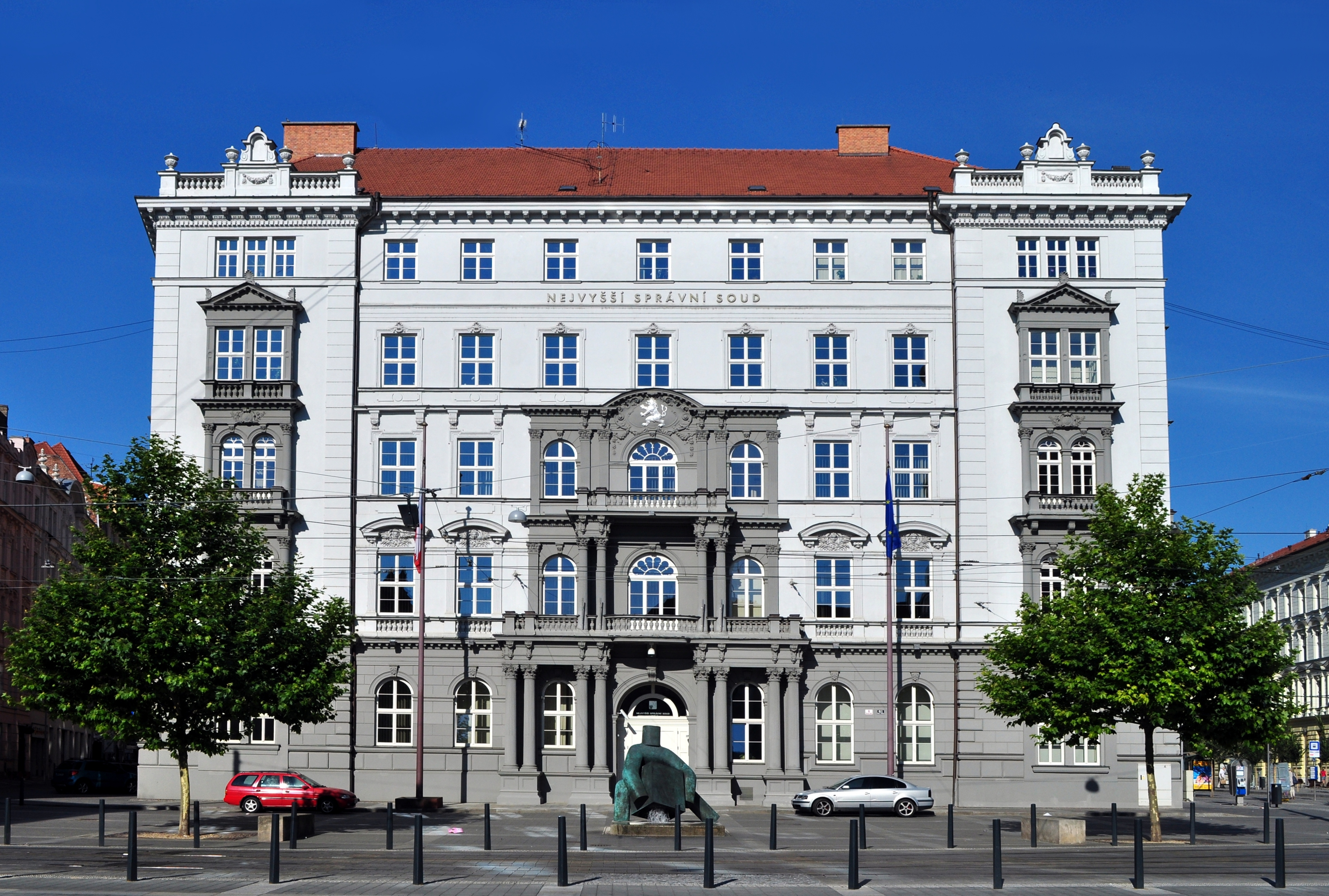
- Interactive map of Supreme Administrative Court of the Czech Republic
- Established: January 2, 2003
- Jurisdiction: Czech Republic
- Location: Brno
- Composition method: Presidential appointment with Prime Minister's countersigning
- Authorised by: Constitution of the Czech Republic
- Website: www.nssoud.cz/Uvod/art/1

President of the Court
- Currently: Karel Šimka
- Since: February 2, 2022

The Supreme Administrative Court of the Czech Republic (Nejvyšší správní soud České republiky) is the court of the highest authority on issues of judicial review of executive (and regulatory) action. It also has jurisdiction over competence disputes and many political matters, such as the elections, the formation and closure of political parties, the eligibility of persons to stand for public office, etc. It also adjudicates in disciplinary proceedings against judges and state prosecutors.

Similarly to other countries in Europe, administrative justice is considered a separate branch of the judiciary in the Czech Republic. The Supreme Administrative Court is the highest judicial authority in administrative law (spanning from asylum law, environmental law, and social security law to electoral law, tax law, competition law, etc. -- covering all public law except criminal law), whereas the Supreme Court deals with civil and criminal matters.

== History ==
The modern SAC can trace its origins back to Bohemia and Moravia under the Austro-Hungarian Empire. From the mid-19th century until the formation of Czechoslovakia, Czech rights with respect to administrative law were safeguarded by the Verwaltungsgerichtshof, or Austrian administrative court, which sat in Vienna. The Administrative Courts of the Czech Republic and Austria thus have a common ancestor.

The Czechoslovak Republic set up its own administrative court which continued to function until the Czech coup of 1948, whereupon it lingered as a theoretical institution for a few years until it was wholly disbanded in 1952. In 1991, the Czechoslovak Federative Republic implied that it would set up a new administrative court in Article 36 of the Charter of Fundamental Rights and Basic Freedoms, but failed to do so in its brief existence. The government of the Czech Republic not only renewed its commitment to this Charter in the constitution, it also specified that the court of highest authority on administrative matters would be called the Supreme Administrative Court, as it had been in the Austro-Hungarian period. However, many of the specifics about the SAC were deferred to "later statutes". The Parliament did not bring such legislation into force until 1 January 2003, when it passed law 150/2002, the Code of Administrative Justice. It is this document, more than perhaps any other, which actually returned a working administrative court to the regions of Bohemia, Moravia and Czech Silesia.

Since 2003, the SAC has been characterized by a growing case load amidst understaffing and the search for a permanent location. The latter was finally accomplished in late 2006, when the court moved out of rented office space and into its new, permanent headquarters on Moravian Square (Moravské náměstí) in Brno. Simultaneously, the Parliament has paid more legislative attention to the SAC, giving greater definition to the scope and powers of the court through several statutes.
