= Supreme Audit Office =

Supreme Audit Office may refer to:

- Supreme Audit Office (Czech Republic)
- Supreme Audit Office (Poland)
