= Judiciary of the Czech Republic =

Overview of court system in Czech Republic

The Judiciary of the Czech Republic is set out in the Constitution, which defines courts as independent institutions within the constitutional framework of checks and balances.

The whole of chapter four of the Constitution of the Czech Republic is dedicated to defining the role of judicial power in the Czech Republic. It states the main function of courts of law is the protection of rights in a manner defined by legislation, and gives them sole responsibility for determining guilt and administering penalties for criminal offences. Courts are defined as independent, although their administration is in the hands of the Ministry of Justice.

Czech courts are presided over by professional judges, who are named for life by the President and normally may not be recalled or transferred against their will.

The Czech Republic has a four-tier system of courts and two-instance proceedings.

Most of the higher courts are seated in Brno; this is to counterbalance the concentration of power in the capital (pragocentrismus).

== Courts ==
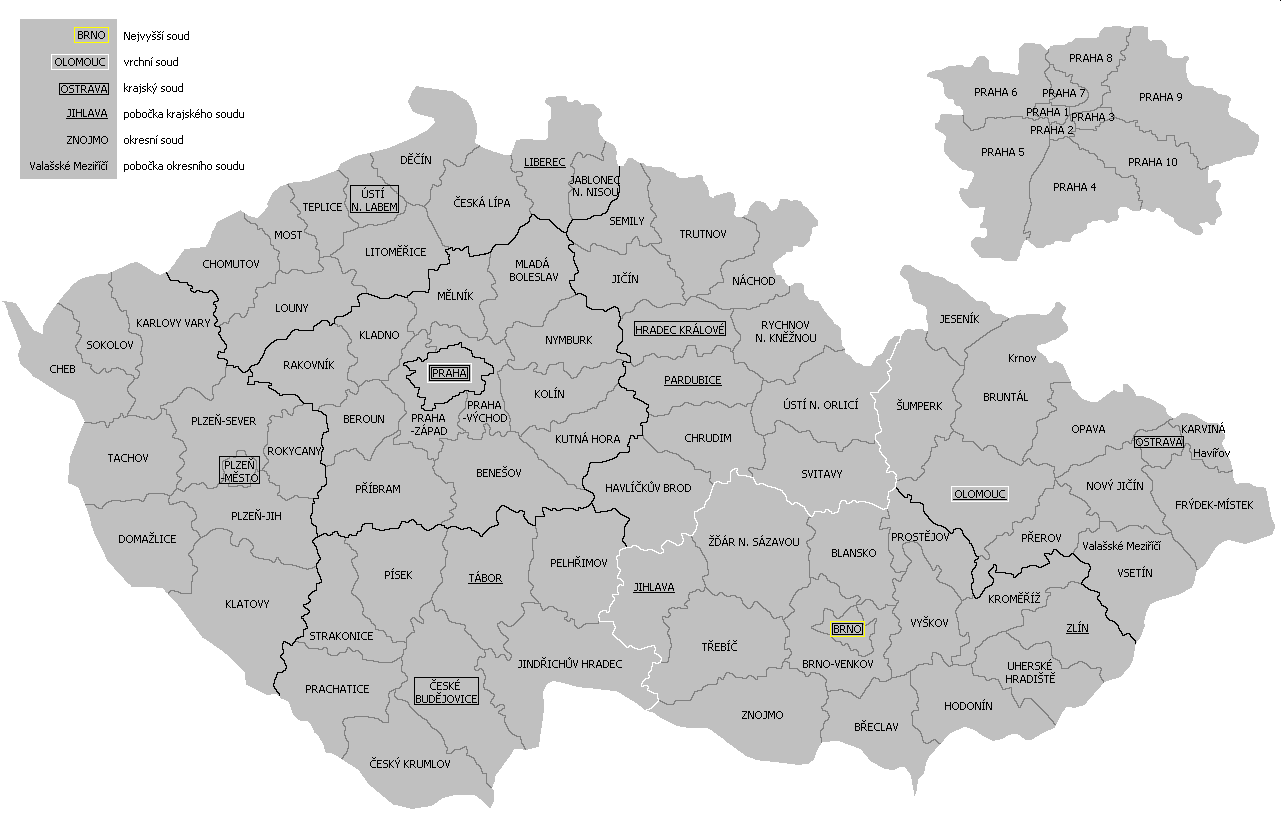
General courts in the Czech Republic

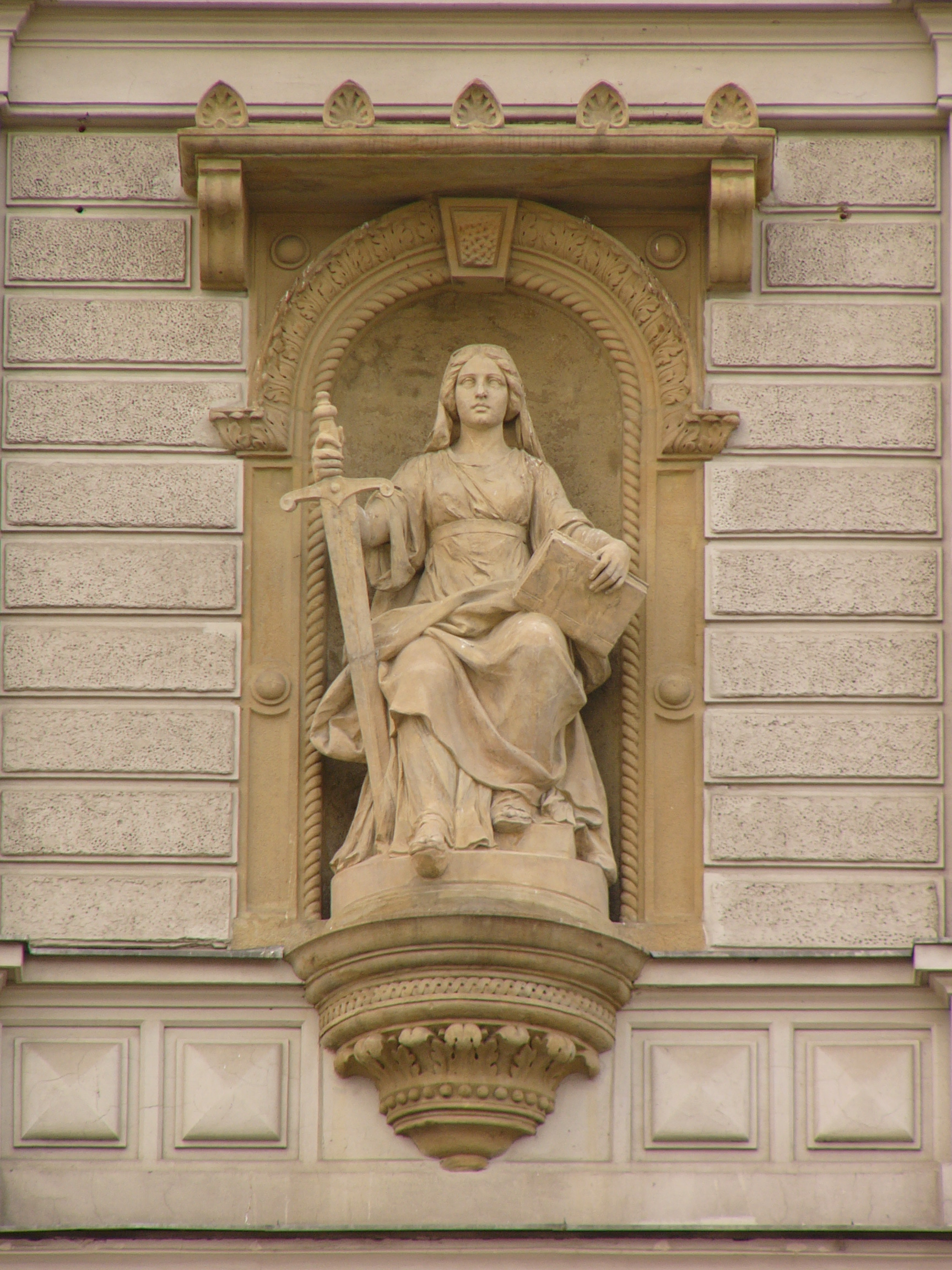
Allegory of Justice on the facade of the District Court in Olomouc

The "Ruling in the Name of the Republic" (Rozsudek jménem republiky) of the Regional Court in Prague in a civil matter

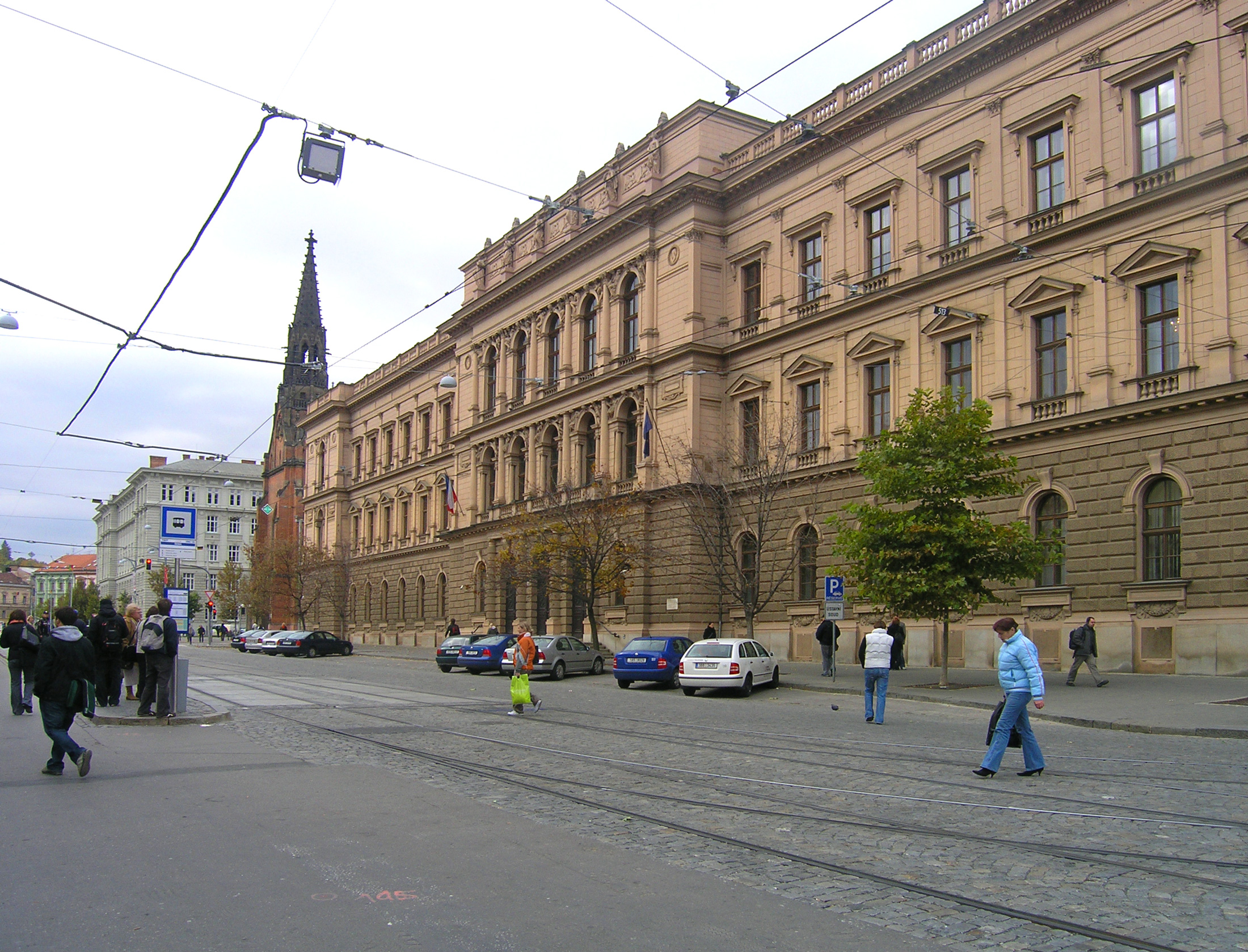
Seat of the Constitutional Court in Brno

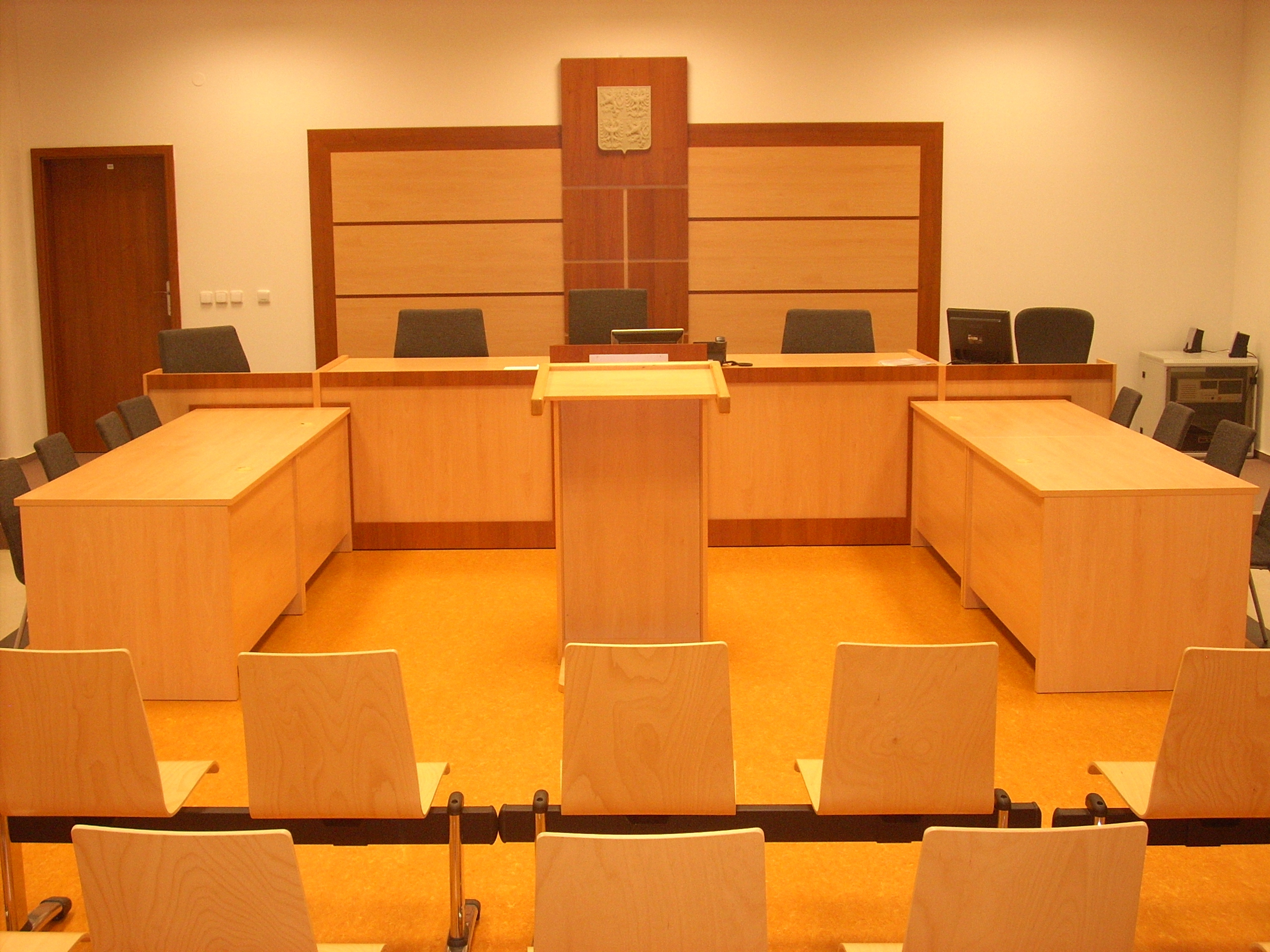
Courtroom at district court

While the broad strokes are set out in the Constitution and the Charter of Fundamental Rights and Basic Freedoms, the organization of the judiciary is detailed in the Act No. 6/2002 Coll. on Courts and Judges. (Note: zákon č. 6/2002 Sb. o soudech, soudcích, přísedících a státní správě soudů a o změně některých dalších zákonů (zákon o soudech a soudcích))

The four tiers of Czech courts are:

1. 2 supreme courts (nejvyšší soudy) – one for ordinary and one for administrative matters
2. 2 superior courts (vrchní soud) – one in Prague and one in Olomouc
3. 8 regional courts (krajské soudy) and 6 branches (pobočka)
4. 86 district courts (okresní soudy)

There are three different jurisdictions:

- courts of general jurisdiction
- administrative courts
- the Constitutional Court of the Czech Republic

The latter two are specialised jurisdictions – if a matter is not assigned to them specifically (by legislation), it will be dealt with the courts of general jurisdiction.

=== The Constitutional Court ===
The Constitutional Court of the Czech Republic (Ústavní soud České republiky) stands outside the general courts structure. Its status and powers are enshrined directly in the Constitution of the Czech Republic. It is the judicial body responsible for constitutionality and the protection of fundamental human rights and freedoms that arise from constitutional order of the Czech Republic and to guarantee the constitutional character of the exercise of state power.

This it achieves mainly through its power to annul statutes (or parts of them) if they are in conflict with the constitutional order (most important of them, the Constitution and the Charter of Fundamental Rights and Freedoms). This is because laws that are part of the constitutional order are legislative acts of the highest force, their enactment also requires a special majority in the parliament. Any other legislation is subordinate. This process is called the judicial review. Related to this is the power of the court to decide about the conformity with the constitutional order of an international treaty prior to its ratification.

The seat of the court is in Brno.

=== Ordinary courts ===
Both criminal and civil cases can start at either a district court or a regional court; in other words, district and regional courts act as courts of the first instance. For example, in criminal proceedings, the district courts would generally hear cases in the first instance. However, when the penalty for the crime in question exceeds 5 years, the case will be tried by a regional court in the first instance.

Boundaries of the district court jurisdictions are, confusingly, non-conterminous with those of the administrative districts.

Of the two high courts, one is seated in Prague with jurisdiction over Bohemia, and the other in Olomouc with jurisdiction over Moravia and Silesia. These handle appeals of cases heard in the first instance by a regional court.

The Supreme Court of the Czech Republic (Nejvyšší soud České republiky), seated in Brno, is the highest judicial authority both in civil (including commercial) and criminal matters, except for issues that fall within the competence of the Constitutional Court or the Supreme Administrative Court. As a court of third instance it works on the principles of cassation (review) and appeal.

=== Administrative courts ===
Czech administrative judiciary (správní soudnictví) has two layers. The lower one consists of specialised administrative chambers within regional courts, which act as courts of first instance. The court of second and last instance is the Supreme Administrative Court of the Czech Republic (Nejvyšší správní soud České republiky), seated in Brno, which, as the name suggests, is dedicated exclusively to administrative justice.

Matters falling within the competence of administrative courts include cases relating to elections, registration of political parties and movements and actions for competence issues between government agencies.

== Officials ==
The most important characters in all proceedings are professional judges (soudce) and advocates (advokát), in criminal trials also state prosecutors (státní zástupce), and sometimes lay judges (přísedící). Note that other legal professions exist, not directly involved in court proceedings – notaries (notář) and bailiffs (soudní exekutor).

=== Judge ===
The judge (soudce) is indeed the central figure of the Czech judiciary, as only his position is defined by the Constitution itself. There is no such thing as jury in Czech courts and the judge himself (or a panel of judges) decides both the verdict and the sentence.

The Czech Republic has a system of career judiciary. The Constitution stipulates that judges are appointed for life by the President of the Republic, and cannot normally be recalled. Submitted by the Minister of Justice, the appointments are subject to co-signing by the Prime Minister. The Constitution requires a judge to be a graduate of a law school, a person with full integrity (no criminal record) and states the position is incompatible with political functions. Further regulations specifies he must be at least 30 and go through a three years of specialised training within the courts.

Since the judiciary is to be kept from influences of the executive and the legislator, all disciplinary matters of judges (as well as state prosecutors) are to be dealt with by the judiciary itself, in particular by the disciplinary chambers of the Supreme Administrative Court.

It does not help the reputation of judges, that around 1,000 of them have been members of the pre-1989 Communist Party, according to a list published by the Ministry of Justice. In the socialist legal system, law and judges were tools of the state, dedicated to punishment of its enemies.

=== Public prosecutor ===
The only body capable of bringing a criminal court action is the state prosecutor. The State Prosecutors' Bureau (státní zastupitelství) is part of the Ministry of Justice.

=== Advocate ===
All legally educated persons providing legal representation in court (and giving advice and other services) are called advokát. To be allowed to legally practise law in the Czech Republic, an advocate must first obtain a master's degree from a faculty of law, a prospective advocate must complete 3 years of professional training crowned by passing the bar examination. He must then become a member of the Czech Bar Association (Česká advokátní komora). Members of equivalent bodies in other EU member states are also allowed.

=== Lay judge ===
Lay judges sit with a professional judge in the first instance of a non-specialized trial. They are appointed by local councils; by municipal councils (zastupitelstvo obce) in district courts, and by regional councils (zastupitelstvo kraje) in regional courts.

== Law ==
The Czech Republic has a legal system of the continental type, rooted in Germanic legal culture. The main source of law is written legislature. Its main areas are systematically codified, mainly in Civil Code and Criminal Code. The form of court proceeding is prescribed in the Codes of Criminal, Civil and Administrative Procedure. The legal force of different Czech legal sources is hierarchical.

=== Procedure ===
Court proceedings are oral and public, with exceptions stated by law (juvenile justice etc.). The procedure is based on inquisitorial system with features of the adversarial system. There is no jury.

For criminal procedure, the chief regulation is Act No. 141/1961 Coll., the Code of Criminal Procedure. In the chapter on preparatory procedure it sets out the role of the bodies involved in criminal proceedings (orgány činné v trestním řízení, namely the police, the public prosecutor and the court) while preparing the prosecution, such as interviewing the witnesses and gathering evidence. The chapter on court proceedings sets out procedures for criminal charge, trial, and appeal process. Although in force since 1961, the code has been amended many times since 1989, adding radically new features, such as plea bargaining (in 2012). In Act No. 218/2003 Coll., on Juvenile Criminal Procedure, separate procedure has been introduced for minors.

The civil procedure is governed by a number of statutes, most importantly Act. No. 99/1963 Coll., the Code of Civil Procedure.

Administrative justice, deals with claims of natural and legal persons, who seek protection from illegal decisions or action of public authorities. While in many respects similar to civil procedure, the administrative court procedure is different in that the defendant here is not an entity of private law, but a public body. Not being a legal person, such a public body could not be sued otherwise. Administrative matters are usually adjudicated by regional courts, and follow the procedure set out in Act. No. 150/2002, the Code of Administrative Procedure. (Note: zákon č. 150/2002 Sb., soudní řád správní)

=== Pardon and amnesty ===
Czech president is endowed by the Constitution with extrajudicial power of interfering in criminal proceedings, before, during and after the trial. He can "pardon and mitigate penalties imposed by the court, order not to initiate criminal proceedings and suspend them if they are already initiated, and expunge sentences" (as if they never happened). When he does so en masse, this is called amnesty. This prerogative had been used several times by Václav Havel in order to stress the discontinuity with pre-1989 socialist regime.

In 2013 Václav Klaus gave amnesty to about a third of prisoners disillusioning the public and attracting criticism from many, including senior judges. In the heart of the controversy appeared stopping of serious fraud cases, when the court proceedings had dragged on for more than eight years. Defending the step, Klaus mentioned the critique by the EU for lengthy court proceedings. His critics, on the other hand, argued that he needlessly interrupted delivering of justice in difficult, high-profile cases of serious financial crime, rouge privatisation and corruption. The Senate took a court action against the president, alleging high treason at the Constitutional Court. However, the Constitutional Court rejected the treason charges on the grounds that Klaus could not be charged with constitutional violations - given the fact that the charges came on the eve of the end of Klaus's term.

== Analysis and criticism ==
=== Access to justice ===
The report of European Union Agency for Fundamental Rights criticizes the Czech Republic mainly for costs and length of legal proceedings, which is a long-term and endemic problem. It says: "In the Czech Republic, for example, where a considerable length of proceedings is suggested to be de-motivating for victims of discrimination, the average duration of civil proceedings can take several years in one region, yet only a few months in another." It is also said to be the most frequent problem across the EU. Other issues mentioned are that legal aid is not quite sufficient (a new law is being prepared) as well as an imperfect Antidiscrimination Act, which, among other things, stipulates reverse burden of proof in antidiscrimination cases.

Amnesty International's reports on the state of human rights repeatedly bring up the discrimination against Roma, especially in education.

=== Judicial governance and informal influence ===
Recent academic research has highlighted how informal practices within Czech courts can shape judicial administration and decision-making. Some senior judges—particularly court presidents and apex-court members—exercise substantial informal influence over the selection of judges, panel composition and case assignment, and even legislative drafting. Such “superjudges” may strengthen judicial expertise and independence, but can also blur traditional separations of powers and reduce internal accountability within the judiciary.

== See also ==
- Czech law
- Czech law schools
- Doctor of Law in the Czech Republic
- Law enforcement in the Czech Republic
- Ombudsman in the Czech Republic
- Politics of the Czech Republic
