= Czech Civil Code =

- Ratified: 3 February 2012
- Date effective: 1 January 2014

The Czech Civil Code (Act No. 89/2012 Coll., in Czech zákon č. 89/2012 Sb, Občanský zákoník or Nový občanský zákoník) was promulgated on 3 February 2012 and entered into force on 1 January 2014. This Code recodified Czech private law and replaced the previous Civil Code of 1964, enacted during the period of communist Czechoslovakia, which, in an amended form, still remains in force in Slovakia today. Alongside the Civil Code, the Business Corporations Act (zákon č. 90/2012 Sb., zákon o obchodních korporacích), codifying corporate law in the area of business corporations, and the Private International Law Act (zákon č. 91/2012 Sb., zákon o mezinárodním právu soukromém), codifying Czech law in the field of private international law, were also adopted. However, the principal legal regulation in the field of civil procedural law, the Code of Civil Procedure (zákon č. 99/1963 Sb., občanský soudní řád) of 1964, has remained in force.

== Structure ==
The Czech Civil Code is divided into five parts:

- General Part (§§ 1–654)
- Family Law (§§ 655–975)
- Absolute Property Rights (§§ 976–1720, including rights in rem and inheritance law)
- Relative Property Rights (§§ 1721–2990, primarily covering the law of obligations)
- Common, Transitional and Final Provisions (§§ 2991–3081).

== History ==
Considerations of the recodification of private law began to emerge as early as the 1990s; however, the actual preparation of the new Civil Code did not commence until after 2000, under the leadership of Professor Karel Eliáš. The main sources of inspiration during the drafting process included the civil codes of other Central European countries, the draft Czechoslovak Civil Code of 1937, and the Civil Code of Quebec. Among the principal aims of the recodification were the removal of the remnants of socialist law and the creation of a general legal regulation applicable throughout the entire field of private law.

The major changes introduced by the new Civil Code include the incorporation of family law (which had previously been regulated by a separate Family Act of 1964, repealed upon the adoption of the new Civil Code), a stronger emphasis on freedom of contract, the possibility of greater judicial discretion in assessing the amount of compensation for personal injury, and the introduction of certain legal institutes previously unknown to Czech law, such as pacht (emphyteusis) or the trust fund.

== See also ==
- Law of the Czech Republic
