= Supreme Court of the Czech Republic =

Coordinates: 49.2053°N 16.6022°E

- Nejvyšší soud České republiky
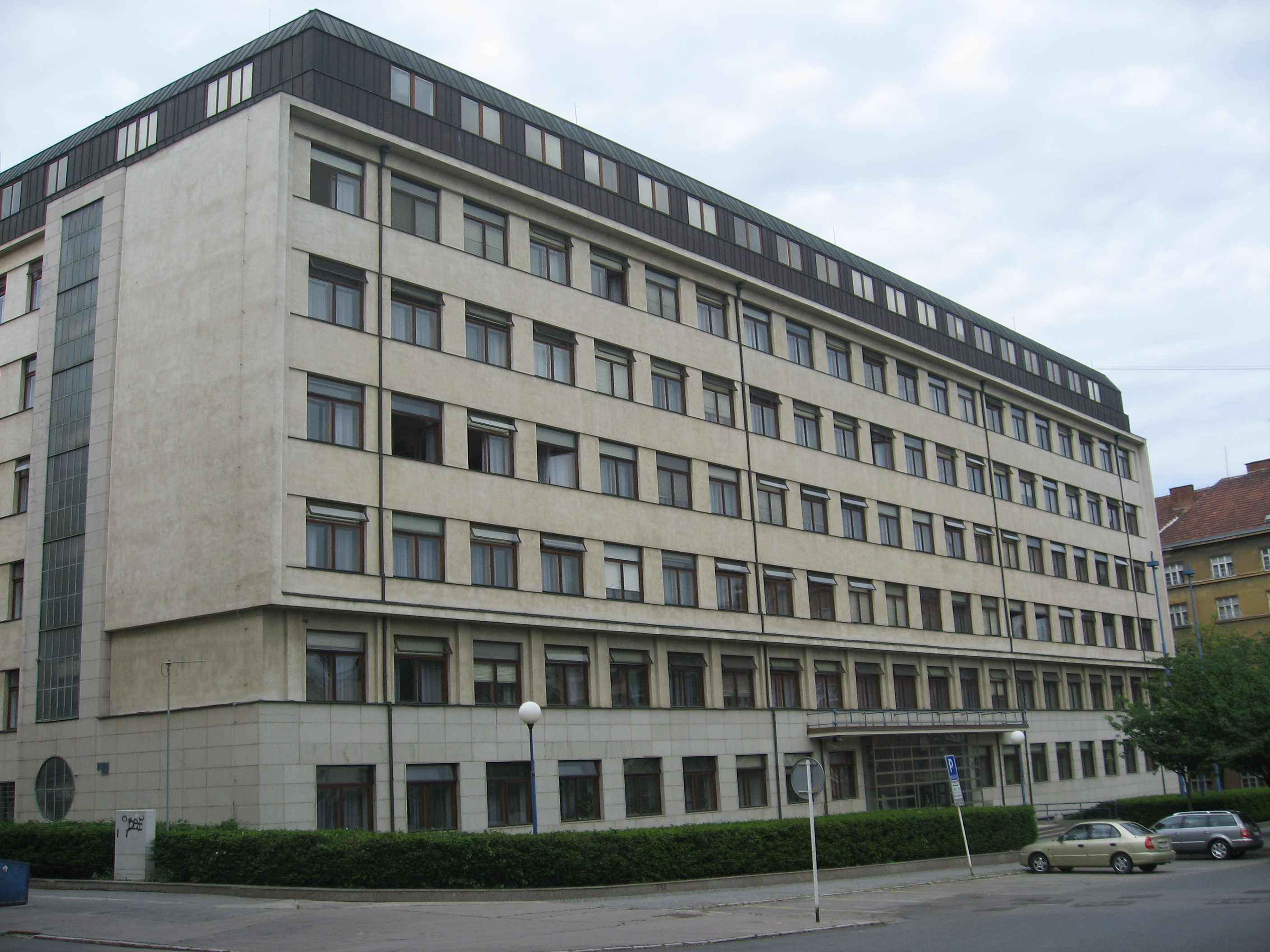
- Seat of the Supreme Court
- Established: 1 January 1993
- Jurisdiction: Czech Republic
- Location: Brno, Czech Republic
- Authorised by: Constitution of the Czech Republic
- Website: www.nsoud.cz

President
- Currently: Petr Angyalossy
- Since: 20 May 2020

Vice President
- Currently: Petr Šuk
- Since: 17 February 2021

The Supreme Court of the Czech Republic (Nejvyšší soud České republiky) is the court of highest appeal for almost all legal cases heard in the Czech Republic. As set forth in the Constitution of the Czech Republic, however, cases of constitutionality, administrative law and political jurisdiction are heard by other courts.

Along with the Supreme Administrative and Constitutional Court, the Supreme Court forms a triumvirate of courts at the summit of the Czech judiciary. It is situated on Burešova Street 20, Brno.

The Supreme Court sits in panels consisting of a Chairman and two judges or it sits in Grand Panels (velký senát) of the Divisions.

The Divisions analyse and evaluate legally effective decisions of lower courts.

The Criminal Division (trestní kolegium) consists of the judges of the Supreme Court, who apply substantive and procedural criminal law.

The Civil and Commercial Division (občanskoprávní a obchodní kolegium) is responsible for ensuring uniformity and lawfulness in the decision-making of courts in civil proceedings. It does so in extraordinary appeal proceedings against decisions of courts of appeal and within its non-decision-making jurisdiction by providing standpoints.

The Grand Panel of the Division (velký senát kolegia) decides cases referred to it by divisions.

The Plenum (plénum) discusses the Supreme Court's Rules of Procedure and adopts standpoints on the courts decision-making.
