= Constitution of the Czech Republic =

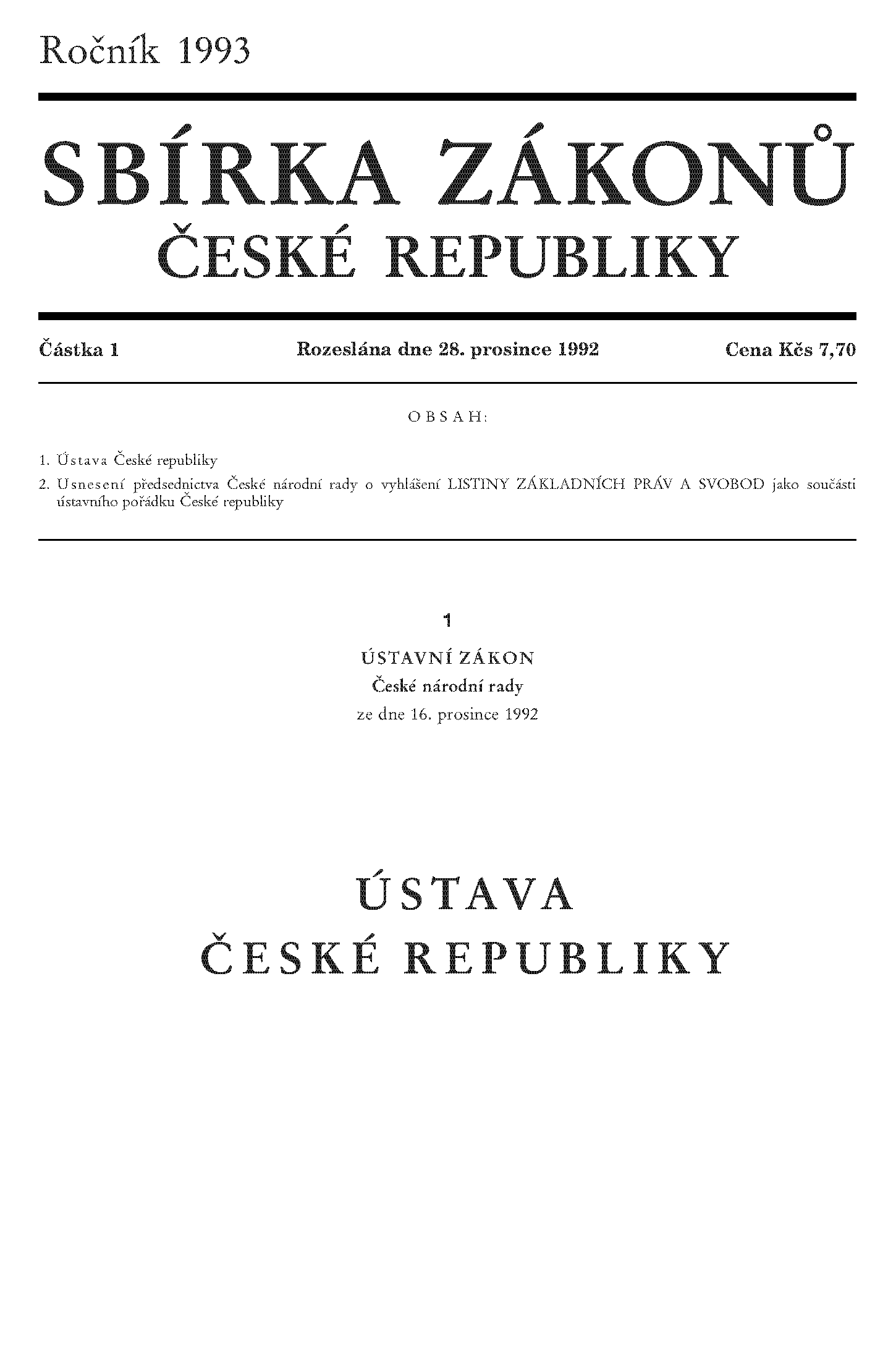

Overview
- Jurisdiction: Czech Republic
- Created: 19 October 1992
- Ratified: 28 December 1992
- Date effective: 1 January 1993
- System: Parliamentary

Government structure
- Branches: 3
- Head of state: President
- Chambers: Bicameral Parliament
- Executive: Prime Minister led Government
- Judiciary: Constitutional Court; Supreme Court; Supreme Administrative Court
- Federalism: Unitary state
- Electoral college: No

History
- Amendments: 8
- Last amended: 1 June 2013
- Author(s): Czech National Council
- Signatories: Milan Uhde and Václav Klaus; 172 of the 198 delegates
- Supersedes: 1960 Constitution of Czechoslovakia

Full text
- Constitution of the Czech Republic at Wikisource

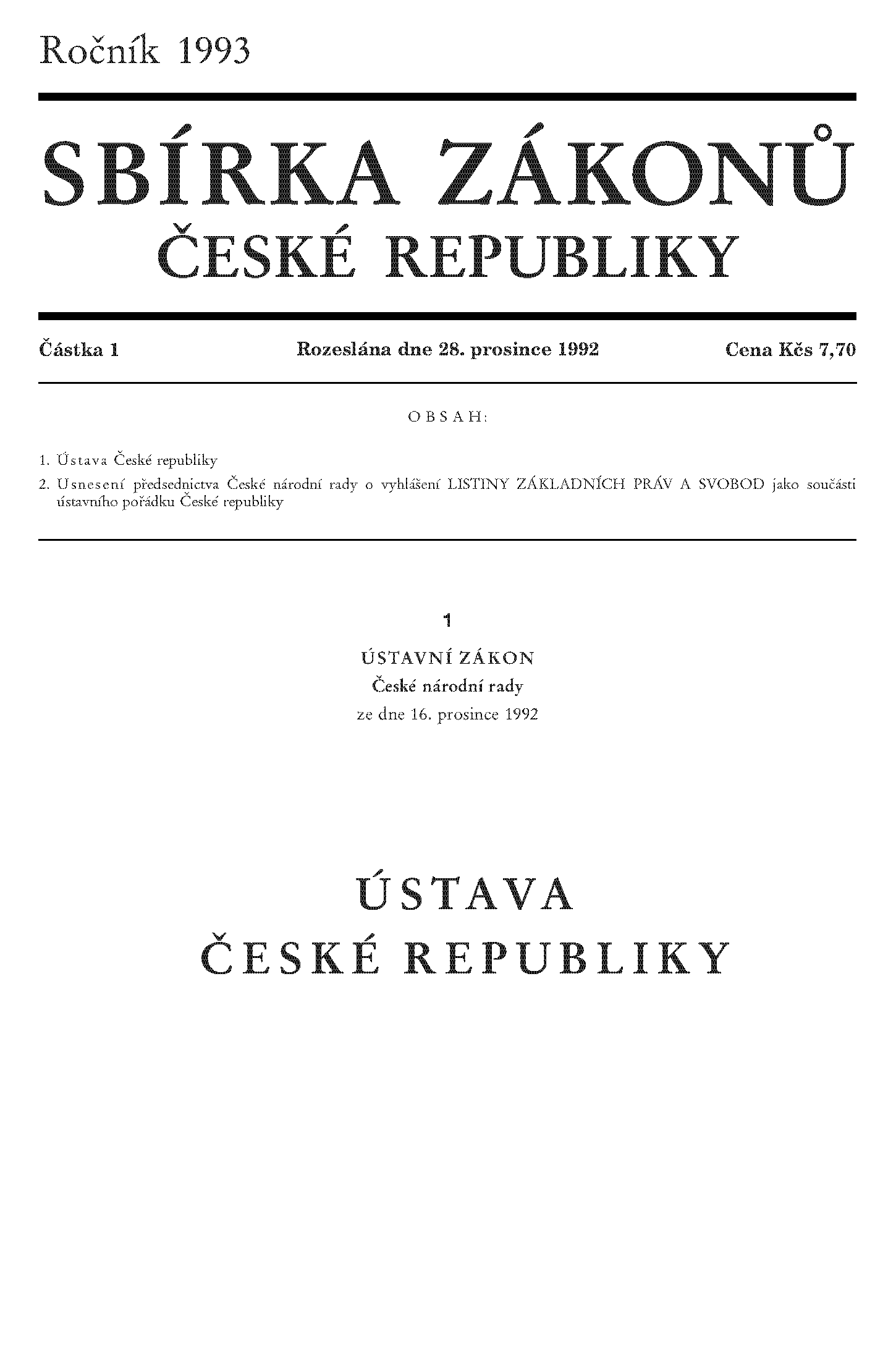
The first page of the Constitution of the Czech Republic as published in the Collection of Laws as Act No. 1/1993 Coll.

The Constitution of the Czech Republic (Czech: Ústava České republiky) is the supreme law of the Czech Republic. The current constitution was adopted by the Czech National Council on 16 December 1992. It entered into force on 1 January 1993, replacing the 1960 Constitution of Czechoslovakia and the constitutional act No. 143/1968 Col., when Czechoslovakia gave way to the Slovak Republic and the Czech Republic in a peaceful dissolution.

The constitution is a constitutional act, and together with other constitutional acts constitutes the so-called constitutional order of the Czech Republic, or the constitution (with a small c). While the Charter of Fundamental Rights and Basic Freedoms (Listina základních práv a svobod, No. 2/1993 Coll.), an equally important constitutional act, asserts human and civil rights, the Constitution is concerned with state sovereignty and territorial integrity, and defines the institutions governing the state.

The Constitution is divided into a preamble and 8 chapters. The fundamental provisions are followed by long chapters on the legislative power, the executive power (the cabinet and the president), and the judicial power (the Constitutional Court and other courts), and shorter chapters on the Supreme Audit Office, the Czech National Bank, and territorial self-government, concluding with interim provisions.

As of December 2022, the constitution has been amended eight times. The most important amendments are Act No. 395/2001 Coll. providing the legal framework for the accession to the EU in 2004, and Act No. 71/2011 Coll., which came into force on 1 October 2012, and provided for the election of the president by popular vote.

== History ==
=== The federalization of Czechoslovakia ===
At the 28th meeting of the National Assembly of the Czechoslovak Socialist Republic on 27 October 1968, a bill called the Constitutional Act on the Czechoslovak Federation was introduced jointly by the Czech National Council, the Slovak National Council, and the Czechoslovak Cabinet. The bill was enacted the same day as Constitutional Act No. 143/1968 Coll.

On its entry into force on 1 January 1969, it created the Czech Socialist Republic and the Slovak Socialist Republic, both of them on an equal footing within the federation. The Act stipulated in article 142, paragraph 2, that both republics would in due course enact their own constitutions, and also envisaged the creation of three constitutional courts. The plan, however, was not followed through due to the onset of the period of normalization.

In fact, Czechoslovakia only functioned as a federation until the enactment of Constitutional Act No. 125/1970 Coll. in December 1970. Its explanatory notes clearly and openly articulate the need for "strengthening of the structural role of the central government of the federation". This act introduced 37 direct changes and additions, which undid the original plan for federation and took away most of the powers of the federal republics. Consequently in 1970 Czechoslovakia became essentially a centrally governed country, with only prima facie attributes of a federation.

The need for a new federal constitution was first announced officially at the 17th Congress of the Communist Party of Czechoslovakia in spring 1986. A working group fronted by Marián Čalfa was set up in 1987 to draft this, and in November 1988, a 153-strong committee of the Communist Party and the National Front was created, led by Miloš Jakeš. The constitution was expected to be enacted after the 18th Congress of the Communist Party, during the course of 1990. In its last draft, it was to be a single constitution serving both the federation and the two republics and, in contrast with its predecessor, did not include the leading role of the Communist Party, and somewhat expanded the list of basic human rights.

In autumn 1989, a group of members of the Federal Assembly proposed the Constitutional Act on the Mode of Enactment of the New Constitutions of the Czechoslovak Socialist Republic, the Czech Socialist Republic, and the Slovak Socialist Republic. Despite not having seen the drafts of the constitutions themselves, on 31 October 1989, the national assemblies of both countries approved this proposal. The resolution of the Czech National Council was promulgated as Act. No. 123/1989 Coll. and the resolution of the Slovak National Council as Act No. 124/1989 Coll. These constitutional acts were intended as a prerequisite for the enactment of a single 'three-in-one' constitution, serving the federation and both republics. Through the consent of both national councils, both republics waived their entitlement to their own constitutions.

However, the events of the Velvet Revolution in 1989 quickly changed everything. As early as the plenary session of the Slovak National Council on 30 November 1989, deputy Majer asked whether it would be necessary to re-enact the provision on the way of enactment together with the new constitution, or whether the resolution of the Slovak National Council from the end of October would stay intact. In its next session on 6 December 1989, the Slovak National Council withdrew its consent of 31 October 1989 in Resolution No. 167/1989 Coll. The Czech National Council enacted a similar provision as Resolution No. 166/1989 Coll. on 19 December 1989. Subsequently, several constitutional acts were enacted, which were supposed to pave the way towards the creation, or rather, restoration of the federation. Both republics had passed constitutional acts on their symbols, and had had a number of powers devolved to them, which were hitherto vested in federal bodies. However, neither the Constitution of the federation, nor the constitutions of either of the republics were enacted prior to the election of 1992.

=== Preparations for the dissolution of the federation ===
On 5 and 6 June 1992, elections were held for the Federal Assembly of the Czech and Slovak Federative Republic (parliament), the Czech National Council, and the Slovak National Council. In the Czech Republic, the Civic Democratic Party won the election; in its electoral programme, the party spoke of either a functional federation, or separation, although keeping the federation was the preferred option. In Slovak Republic, the winner was the Movement for a Democratic Slovakia, whose election promise was to acquire international legal subjectivity for Slovakia – although this was clearly inconsistent with the continuation of the shared state, the party convinced voters that it did not rule out the existence of the federation.

The Constitution of the Slovak Republic was enacted on 1 September 1992, and came into force on 1 October 1992, three months before the dissolution of Czechoslovakia.

The making of the Constitution of the Czech Republic also commenced soon after the election. Two committees were set up: a government committee, and a committee of the Presidium of the Czech National Council.

The government committee was chaired by Václav Klaus; its other members were Jan Kalvoda, Cyril Svoboda, Filip Šedivý, Jiří Vlach, Vojtěch Cepl, Daniel Kroupa, Václav Benda, Václav Pečich, Jan Litomiský, Miloslav Výborný, Václav Novotný, Miroslav Sylla, Pavel Zářecký, and Dušan Hendrych. The members of the committee of the Czech National Council were Marek Benda, Jiří Bílý, Pavel Hirsch, Antonín Hrazdíra, Ivana Janů, Hana Marvanová, Ivan Mašek, Jaroslav Ortman, Jiří Payne, Anna Röschová, Vítězslav Sochor, Milan Uhde, and Jan Vik. In August 1992, it was agreed that the government committee would be entrusted with drafting the Constitution.

There were several possible starting points for the new constitution. The secretary of the government committee, Cyril Svoboda, summed them up: to take the Czechoslovak Constitution of 1920 as a point of departure, to rework the existing Constitution of the Czech and Slovak Federative Republic, or to draft a brand new one. Svoboda, as well as several other members of the committee, were in favour of the first option, to make use of the Constitution of the First Czechoslovak Republic.

One of the major obstacles seemed to be the status of the Charter of Fundamental Rights and Freedoms. It had been declared a part of the legal system by Constitutional Act No. 23/1991 Coll., which required other constitutional acts to comply with it. Václav Klaus was totally opposed to the Charter in any form. In particular, he was against the wording of article 17 of the Charter, concerning a right to information (Klaus would have preferred the wording "a right to search out information" instead) and he also disagreed with the Charter granting a right to organize in trade unions, and a right to reward for work, vested in article 28. Miroslav Výborný proposed a solution to the problem, introducing the idea of the so-called constitutional order, although influential jurists (Filip, Knapp) were critical of it.

Between 19 and 24 October 1992, work on the final draft of the constitution commenced in Karlovy Vary. The first few articles were taken from older drafts; the articles on executive power were penned by Miroslav and Jindřiška Syllovi. The articles on the powers of the president were written by Cyril Svoboda, those concerning the powers of the cabinet by Dušan Hendrych, and the articles on the judiciary by František Zoulík. Hendrych also drafted chapters on the Czech National Bank and the Supreme Audit Office, while Pavel Zářecký drafted chapters on territorial self-government.

On 23 October 1992, three experts on constitutional law arrived to review the draft: Pavel Peška, Vladimír Klokočka and Pavel Holländer.

The explanatory notes were written by Cyril Svoboda and Milena Poláková, on the weekend before it was due to be presented to prime minister Klaus.

In all, four different drafts were created during the preparation of the Constitution, written respectively by the government, the Czechoslovak Social-Democratic Party, the Communist Party of Bohemia and Moravia, and the Liberal-Social Union. Only the first of these was read in the Czech National Council.

=== Enactment ===
The government bill of the Constitution of the Czech Republic was read in the Czech National Council on 16 December 1992. It was introduced by Václav Klaus, the prime minister of the Czech Republic. Out of a number of changes proposed during the reading, only deputy Pavel Hirš's proposal was incorporated, returning into the bill proportional voting system for the Chamber of Deputies and two-round run-off system for the Senate.

The result of the vote was announced by the chair of the Czech National Assembly, Milan Uhde: "[...] out of 198 deputies present, who registered their vote, 16 were against, 10 abstained, and by 172 votes in its support, the Constitution of the Czech Republic has been enacted."

== Characteristics ==
The Constitution of the Czech Republic is a written constitution, having been promulgated in the official journal, the Collection of Laws.

With reference to the provision of the article 39, paragraph 4 of the Constitution, which states that "for the enactment of a constitutional act, 3/5 of all deputies must agree, and 3/5 of senators present", changing the constitution is a more difficult procedure than changing an ordinary statute, making it an entrenched constitution in the typology of constitutions. Despite the tradition of entrenched constitutions throughout Czech history, some voiced the opinion, during the preparation of the Constitution of the Czech Republic, that this one should be flexible.

With regard to Karl Loewenstein's ontological classification of constitutions, the Czech Constitution can be characterized as normative. The political process is carried out by the rules set out in it. High level of correspondence between the constitution and reality also makes it a real constitution.

Despite being heavily influenced by the Czechoslovak Constitutional Charter of 1920, the Czech Constitution is an original one. It has been agreed on through a political process.

== The content of the Constitution ==
=== Preamble ===
Most of the preamble was written by Václav Havel and edited by Milan Uhde. The text recalls the history of Czech statehood and goes on to declare the basic values of the state, mentioning democracy and, thanks to Havel, the "civic society".

=== Chapter One – Fundamental provisions ===
==== The fundamental principles ====
The provisions of article 1 of the Constitution enshrine fundamental principles of the whole constitutional system of the Czech Republic. It defines the state as a republic, as sovereign, unitary and democratic Rechtsstaat (state characterized by the rule of law) based on respect to rights and freedoms of the citizen and man.

The word "sovereign" means that the Czech Republic is fully capable of holding rights and carrying out legal acts, and is a full subject of international law, independent of any other power. Such sovereignty may, however, be voluntarily limited by membership in an international organisation (this is the so-called shared or pooled sovereignty), as is the case with the Czech Republic and the European Union.

The term "unitary" makes it clear that the state is not a federation or confederation.

The definition of the Czech Republic as a democratic Rechtsstaat stresses the combination of the two principles, democracy and the rule of law. To modify either of these two is forbidden by article 9 of the Constitution. The term Rechtsstaat should not be understood merely formally, but substantively. The Constitutional Court confirmed this in its adjudications. As early as December 1993, it ruled: "The Constitution accepts and respects the principle of legality as a part of the overall concept of a Rechtsstaat; it does not merely link positive law to formal legality, it also subordinates the construction and application of legal norms to the substantive meaning of their content; it makes it a premise of law that it respects basic constitutive values of democratic society, and measures the application of legal norms by these values."

The statement that the Czech Republic is a state "based on respecting the rights and freedoms of man and citizen" defines the purpose of the state, which is binding for the government. This is closely related to the provision of article 3, pronouncing the Charter a part of the constitutional order, and article 9, forbidding everyone, including those legislating constitutional acts, to change the fundamental requisites of the democratic Rechtsstaat.

The second paragraph, added to the Constitution in the Euro-amendment, adopts the basic principle of international law, to honestly fulfill all international obligations. From this article, a duty arises for the government, namely the legislature, not to enact laws which would impede compliance with international legal obligations. As a part of the application of international legal norms, the case law of international judicial institutions responsible for application of such norms must be taken into account.

==== Government ====
In his 1863 Gettysburg Address, Abraham Lincoln spoke of three features of democracy: "government of the people, by the people, for the people". Government of the people is enshrined in article 2 paragraph 1 of the Constitution, which postulates the sovereignty of the people, and the division of government into executive power, legislative power, and judicial power. The sovereignty of the people is not a legal principle, but a political principle – it means that it is the people, who have the right to create the system of values, institutions, and procedures, through which the state is governed. No government body can exist unless it derived its legitimacy from the people, directly or indirectly.

Paragraph 2 makes it possible for future enactment of a constitutional act that would introduce some institutions of direct democracy, namely via referendum. The Cabinet's draft of the Constitution did not contain such a provision, as the Civic Democratic Party and the Civic Democratic Alliance were opposed to referendums. In the end, it did find its way into the Constitution with support from some social democratic deputies, and at the insistence of Václav Havel. Although several drafts of a constitutional act on referendum had been prepared since the enactment of the Constitution, the only nationwide referendum conducted so far was the referendum on the accession of the Czech Republic to the European Union. Paragraphs 3 and 4 embody the principle of enumerated powers and the silence of law principle. The principle of enumerated powers requires that the power of the state can only be applied in such cases, within such boundaries, and by such means, as is stipulated by law. The silence of law principle, in contrast, states that everyone may do everything law does not prohibit, and is not required to do anything, unless it is imposed on him by law. This provision is similar to article 2 of the Charter. Where the constitution talks of "every citizen", the Charter widens its to "everyone".

==== The Charter of Fundamental Rights and Freedoms ====
Article 3, incorporating the Charter of Fundamental Rights and Freedoms into the constitutional order of the Czech Republic, is not a provision typical for a constitution. It was not before December 1992 that it was incorporated into the Constitution, based on political deal. While the government's draft at first did not contain any reference to the Charter, future drafts at least mentioned it in interim and final provisions, which was considered inadequate to its importance. In the end, all committees of the Czech National Council proposed in December 1992 that a reference to the Charter be incorporated into the first section of the Constitution. The Charter, hitherto part of Constitutional Act 23/1991 Coll., was disconnected from it and newly enacted in an extraordinary resolution of the Presidium of the Czech National Council, and published as No. 2/1993, Coll. This has later been used to question the normative nature of the Charter. Similar reference to a statute regulating fundamental rights and freedoms was also enshrined in Austria's December Constitution (Dezemberverfassung) of 1867 and the second interim constitution of the Czechoslovak Republic (No. 37/1918 Coll. and following).

==== Judicial protection ====
Article 4 states that fundamental rights and freedoms are subject to judicial protection. These rights are not limited to those enshrined in the Charter, but also includes those in other constitutional regulations and international treaties.

==== Political system and political decision-making ====
The political system of the Czech Republic is defined in article 5, which also ascribes irreplaceable role to political parties. Article 6 is dedicated to political decision-making, enshrining the principles of majority rule coupled with the protection of minorities.

==== Protection of nature ====
Article 7 enshrining the protection of nature was not a part of the Cabinet's draft of the Constitution. It was written by Václav Havel, convinced that there should be an "environmental paragraph" in the Constitution. In the upshot, only a curtailed version of Havel's proposal made it into the Constitution.

==== Territorial self-government ====
Article 8 is a basic provision granting the principle of territorial self-government. Such a provision is indispensable, as it is a substantial constitutive feature of democratic 'rechsstaat', as well as a requirement of the European Charter of Local Self-Government. Territorial self-government is further detailed in articles 99–105.

==== Modification of the Constitution and the eternity clause ====
There are three basic rules laid out in article 9, stating that the Constitution can only be changed by a Constitutional Act (par. 1), that not even such a change can remove or disrupt the substantive core of the Constitution (par. 3), and that not even construction or interpretation of legal regulations can remove or disrupt this core (par. 3).

The second paragraph, stating that changing substantial features of a democratic state is not admissible, is what is known as entrenched substantive core of the Constitution. Historically, such entrenchment clause first appeared in the first Constitution of the French Republic of August 1804, stating that republican form of government can not be revised. Identical construction is in the current Constitution of France.

Another important historical instance of entrenched clause in a constitution was enshrined in the Basic Law for the Federal Republic of Germany of 1949, in reaction to development of 1919–1945. Firstly, it states that the Basic Law can only be changed by a statute that explicitly modifies or amends the wording of the Basic Law. Secondly, it contains a provision, which sets the substantive core beyond the reach of powers of the constitution-maker. This is called imperative of unchangeability or eternity clause. Unlike its Czech counterpart, the eternity clause (Ewigkeitsklausul) of the German Basic Law does specify, what its substantive core is: the subdivision of the federation into states, the states' powers in lawmaking, the dignity of a human, the principles of a democratic social state, the sovereignty of the people, the division of powers, the limitation of government by law, and the right to resist.

==== International treaties ====
Article 10 of the Constitution embeds key provisions in relation to incorporation of international law into domestic law. Until the 'Euro-amendment' came into effect, it bestowed legal power akin to constitutional order onto international treaties on human rights and fundamental freedoms. The amendment has extended the treaties this applies to, and also granted them priority of application.

==== Transfer of powers onto international organizations ====
Articles 10a and 10b have been added into the Constitution by the 'Euro-amendment' in reaction to the accession of the Czech Republic to the EU. Article 10a set the condition on the transfer of powers on an international organization or institution. Article 10b stipulates that regarding issues obligations arising from such a membership, it is a duty of the Cabinet to inform the Parliament, and a right of the chambers of the Parliament to give their opinion.

==== Territorial integrity ====
Constitutional grounds for defining what is Czech national territory are article 11, also stipulates that a constitutional act is necessary to modify Czech Republic's national borders.

==== Czech citizenship ====
Article 12 sets rules about the acquisition and loss of Czech citizenship. In 2007, a bill of a constitutional act on citizenship was drafted, which said explicitly that there was no legal claim to being granted Czech citizenship. This was likely an attempt to overcome case law of the Supreme Administrative Court, which has adjudicated that there is a right to Czech citizenship.

==== The capital and symbols of the state ====
Prague is declared the capital in article 13. While details are left to a statute, article 14 lists the symbols of the Czech Republic: the coat of arms, the official colours, the national flag, the flag of the president, the official seal and the national anthem.

=== Chapter Two – Legislative power ===
==== The Parliament, its chambers and members ====
Chapter two vests legislative and constitution-making power in the Czech Parliament. Article 15 stipulates that legislative power belongs to the Parliament, consisting of two chambers, the Chamber of Deputies and the Senate. Article 16 says that the Chamber of Deputies has 200 members elected for a four-year term (the election is based upon proportional system representation), while the Senate has 81 members elected for 6 years (the election is based upon majority system), election being held every two year to select one third of them. Article 17 specifies election schedule. Article 18 regulates active suffrage, or the right to be elected, and the election process.

=== Chapter Three ===
It provides for the ways in which specific executive powers shall be delineated between the President of the Republic and the government (as headed by the Prime Minister). The chapter also outlines the nature of the direct election of the President by the public as well as the limitations of presidential power in selecting a government. (Articles 54–80).

=== Chapter Four ===
In article 81, the Constitution states that the judicial power shall be carried out in the name of the republic by courts of law, independent on the legislature and the executive. The in the name of republic formula contained here is also quoted in each substantive ruling of a Czech court. Article 82 lays out the requirement of independence and impartiality of judges, and in effect of all the decision by the judiciary.

Articles 83–89 is dedicated to the Constitutional Court of the Czech Republic and states, that it is only to be governed by the constitution. Limiting its powers by a regular statute, for example, is out of question. The 15 judges, nominated by the Senate and named by the president for the period of 10 years, are granted immunity akin to the one members of parliament enjoy.

Articles 90–96 describe the court system, comprising the Supreme Court of the Czech Republic, the Supreme Administrative Court, high courts, regional courts, and district courts.

=== Chapter Five ===
The constitution establishes The Supreme Control Office (Article 97).

=== Chapter Six ===
In article 98, the constitution establishes the position and competences of the Czech National Bank (CNB). It assign the CNB the role of central bank, with the primary purpose of maintaining price stability. External interventions into its activities must be permitted by law. It was the then-governor of the national bank Josef Tošovský, who requested that the bank's position be incorporated into the Constitution. As the lawyers drafting the document could not find a way of placing it within the three powers, the bank was given its own chapter.

=== Chapter Seven ===
The constitution provides the basis for local government, by dividing the territory of the republic into self-governing territorial districts, and regions (Articles 99–105).

=== Chapter Eight ===
The document concludes by weighing in on a number of so-called 'interim' issues which mainly applied to the Republic in its first year of existence. Chiefly, it specifically delineates what officers or laws of the former Czech government as a constituent part of the Czechoslovak Federal Republic remained in force until the Czech Republic produced new officeholders or laws under the provisions found elsewhere in the constitution. Of the provisions of this chapter, by far the most lasting has been Article 112 (1), which made the Charter of Fundamental Rights and Freedoms (1991) a part of the constitution. This move has commonality with the way in which the Bill of Rights was quickly annexed to the US constitution, granting Czech citizens specific personal rights that would be extremely difficult for a future Czech government to abrogate (Articles 106–113).

== Amending the Constitution ==
=== Overall development ===
Stability has always been a characteristic of constitutional law of the Czech Republic and Czechoslovakia, and their constitutions (the sum of all constitutional acts). Since the Constitution came into force, it has only been modified a few times, and the amendments did not have a major impact on the Czech constitutional system.

=== Higher territorial self-governing units ===
The first Act of Parliament modifying the Constitution was Constitutional Act No. 347/1997 Coll, on the Creation of Higher Self-Governing Units and Amending Constitutional Act of the Czech National Assembly No. 1/1993 Coll., the Constitution of the Czech Republic. It created higher territorial self-governing units, as assumed by Article 100 paragraph 3 of the Constitution.

=== NATO ===
The wording of the Constitution was further changed by Constitutional Act No. 300/2000 Coll., relating to accession of the Czech Republic into the North Atlantic Alliance in 1999. The act changed provisions of the Constitution on matters such as deployment of armed forces, stay of allied armed forces on the territory of the Czech Republic, participation of the country in the defence systems of international organisations, and division of powers between the cabinet and the Parliament in such matters.

=== The Czech National Bank ===
Another modification to the Constitution brought Constitutional Act No. 448/2001 Coll. The Cabinet has prepared an amendment of the constitution in February 2000, but this has been this rejected by the Chamber of Deputies in second reading. Part of the bill proposed the change of article 98 of the Constitution, in preparation for the new wording of Act No. 6/1993 Coll. on the Czech National Bank. As a result of the rejection by the legislature, the Act on the Czech National bank became incompatible with the Constitution. The new wording of the Act, which entailed the necessity to modify the constitution, has become a necessity as a consequence and a requirement of the Treaty Establishing the European Economic Community and the Protocol on the Statute of the European System of Central Banks and the European Central Bank, attached to this treaty. A new bill has been drafted, limited to a technicality – replacing "the stability of currency" by "the stability of prices" in article 98.

=== The Euro-amendment ===
Passed on 18 October 2001, the so-called 'Euro-amendment', was a rather important change to the Constitution. Having entered into effect on 1 June 2002, Act No. 395/2001 Coll. added paragraph 2 into article 1, stating that the country abides by obligations arising from international law. It changed article 10, hitherto ascribing high legal force only to international treaties on basic human rights and freedoms, broadening it to grant this higher legal force to all promulgated international treaties, which the Parliament agreed to ratify. Articles 10a and 10b have been added, providing guidelines on the conditions of transfer of powers to an international organisation or organisations. With respect to obligations arising from the membership in such a body, the Cabinet has the duty to inform the Parliament, and both chambers of the Parliament have the right to give their opinion. Several other articles have been changed, including the list of laws that are binding for a judge of the Constitutional Court.

=== The referendum on the accession to the EU ===
The opposition of a part of the political class towards the introduction of features of direct democracy was the reason, for a one-off provision to have been incorporated into the Constitution, for the referendum on the accession of the Czech Republic to the European Union, published as Constitutional Act No. 515/2002 Coll.

=== Self-dissolution of the Chamber of Deputies ===
Constitutional Act No. 319/2009 Coll. has in essence been prepared back in 2001 by the standing committee of the Senate for the Constitution of the Czech Republic and parliamentary procedures. The Act has introduced the possibility of self-dissolution of the Chamber of Deputies, in reaction to a previous ruling by the Constitutional Court, which had annulled the Constitutional Act on the Shortening of the Fifth Electoral Term of the Chamber of Deputies. At the same time, the Act fixed a loophole in the Constitution, which had not foreseen and provided for the situation, when the president would not be able to call elections.

=== Direct election of the president ===
In June 2011, the government introduced into the chamber of deputies a bill of a constitutional act, providing for president to be elected by popular vote. The bill has been approved by the Chamber of Deputies in December 2011 and by the Senate in February 2012. Until the new Constitutional Act No. 71/2012 Coll. entered into force on 1 October 2012, president was elected at a joint session of both Chambers of the Parliament. The election was supposed to take place within 30 days before the incumbent president's term of office ended, or 30 days after, in case it ended prematurely. The powers of president have been modified too. To order that a criminal procedure must not be commenced, or, had it been commenced, that it not be continued, the president now needs co-action of the government. While the general entry into force of the Act has been fixed in advance for the coming presidential election, for the part of the Act regarding the liability of president for high treason, and the condition for bringing a constitutional action against the president by the Senate, a later date has been set, 8 March 2013.

== See also ==
- Principle of legality in French criminal law
