= Charter of Fundamental Rights and Freedoms =

The Charter of Fundamental Rights and Freedoms (Czech: Listina základních práv a svobod, Slovak: Listina základných práv a slobôd) is a document enacted in 1991 by the Czechoslovak Federative Republic and currently continued as part of the constitutional systems of both the Czech Republic and Slovak Republic.

== Differences in the successor states of Czechoslovakia ==
In the Czech Republic, the document was kept in its entirety as a separate document from the constitution, but imbued with the same legal standing as the constitution. It is a part of the Constitutional Code of the Czech Republic – a sum of constitutional laws and other sources of law, explicitly named in the constitution – that possesses the highest level of legal force.

In Slovakia, the basic provisions of the Charter were integrated directly into the Slovak constitution. Though these legal provisions articles are substantively the same, there are some differences, such as the Slovak contention that "the privacy of correspondence and secrecy of mailed messages and other written documents and the protection of personal data are guaranteed."

The inclusion of the goals of the Charter directly into the Slovak constitution means that only the Czech Republic currently has a "Charter of Fundamental Rights and Basic Freedoms".

== Creation of the Czech Constitution ==
An agreement was signed after the negotiations of the prime ministers Václav Klaus and Vladimír Mečiar on in August 1992, that set the date of the dissolution of Czechoslovakia to 31 December 1992. The dissolution was approved by the Parliament in November of the same year.

Because of an opposition from the Civic Democratic Alliance (ODA), the Civic Democratic Party (ODS) and especially the prime minister Klaus – who described the Charter as "the weeds of the Constitution" – the Charter never became a part of the Constitution. The time was running out and the members of the parliament had to reach an agreement on the text of the new Czech Constitution. Because of that a new legal term Constitutional Code was created, so that the Charter could have a legal authority similar to the constitution without being a part of the constitution. Viktor Knapp – a distinguished Czech lawyer – called this at the time "a result of a strange legislative compromise".

== Amendments to the Charter ==
=== First Amendment (1998) ===
The Charter was first amended by the Constitutional Act No. 162/1998 Coll., which changed the length of possible police detention without charges. The Article 8(3) of the Charter originally allowed the police to detain a person for questioning for up to 24 hours, after which time the person must be either released or charged and handed over to a court with request for remand. This was amended in 1998 to allow up to 48 hours of police detention without charges.

=== Second Amendment (2021) ===
The second amendment to the Charter was passed as the Constitutional Act No. 295/2021 Coll. A new sentence was added to the Article 6(4), stating that: "The right to defend own life or life of another person also with arms is guaranteed under conditions set out in the law."

The provision is interpreted as guaranteeing legal accessibility of arms in a way that must ensure possibility of effective self-defense and as constitutional stipulation which underscores the individual right to be prepared with arms against an eventual attack, i.e. that courts cannot draw a negative inference from the fact that a defender had been preparing to avert a possible attack with use of weapons.

== Comparison with the US legislation ==
The document is somewhat analogous to the United States Bill of Rights, although its provisions tend to be more specific, and imbue its citizens with more and different rights than in United States constitutional law, which by contrast recognizes and protects natural rights rather than grant legal entitlement.
