= Supreme Audit Office (Czech Republic) =

Supreme Audit Office of the Czech Republic
- Nejvyšší kontrolní úřad (NKÚ)
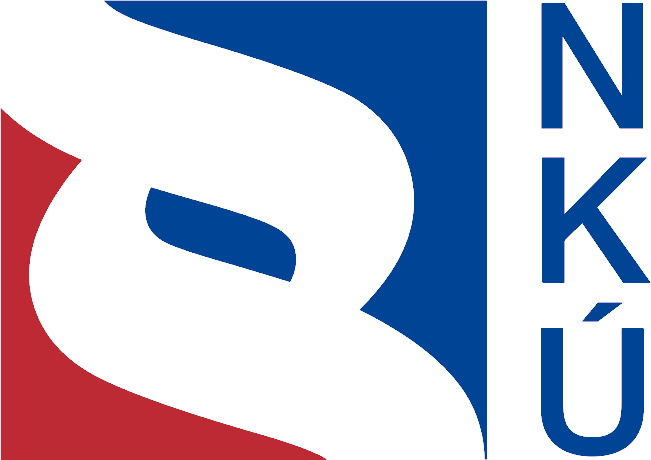
- Official logo, as of 2008

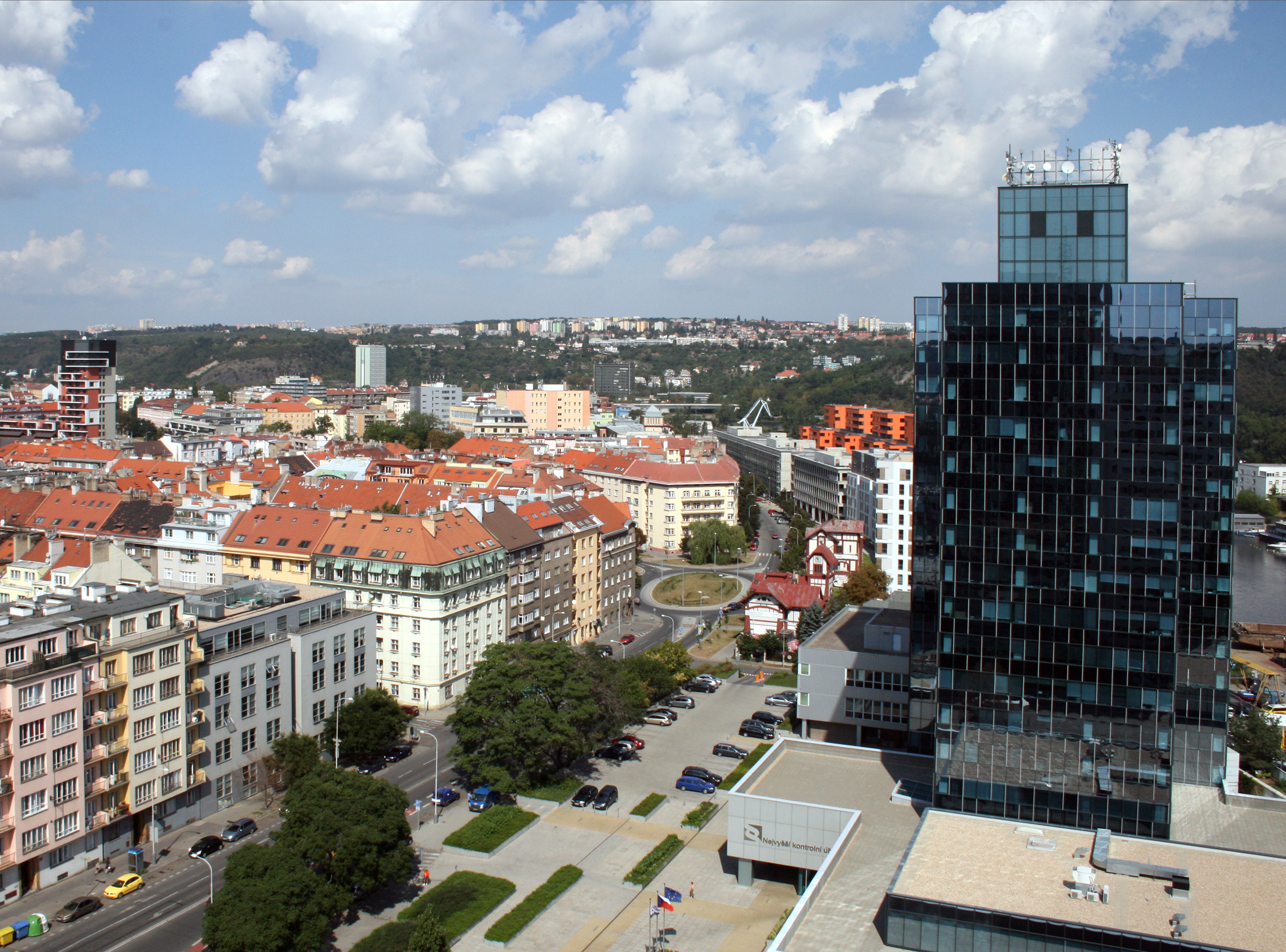
- Former headquarters of NKÚ in Prague.

Agency overview
- Formed: in theory 1 January 1993 in practice 1 July 1993
- Preceding agencies: Major predecessors include: Federal Ministry of Control and Ministry for Czechia and Ministry for Slovakia (1989); Central Commission of State Control and Statistics (1960); Ministry of State Control (1951); Supreme Accounting Audit Office (1919)
- Headquarters: Komunardů 1634/44, 170 00, Prague 7, Czech Republic
- Minister responsible: none; constitutionally independent
- Agency executives: Miroslav Kala, President; Jan Málek, Vice-President
- Website: nku.cz/en/

The Supreme Audit Office of the Czech Republic (Czech: Nejvyšší kontrolní úřad, NKÚ) – alternately known in English as the Supreme Control Office of the Czech Republic – is a "unique, independent constitutional entity to supervise the management of the state property and the state budget."

It was a part of the original form of the Constitution of the Czech Republic, created by Article 97 of that document on 1 January 1993. However, because the constitution left all of the details of the operation of the office up to future legislation, it was not until Act 166/1993 came into effect on 1 July 1993 that the office could in practice be formed.

== English name ==
The presence of two English names for the office is the result of varying translations of its name in the Constitution and its authorizing legislation. In the official translation of the Constitution, the name follows the Czech literally. Hence, it confers the name, "Supreme Control Office", indicating that the office performed the duties of a controller. In the official translation of Act 166/1993, however, a more precise English word is used, resulting in "Supreme Audit Office", conveying the sense that the principal duties of the office are those of an external auditor. It is this latter translation which has perhaps gained dominance, given its singular use on the agency's official website.

== See also ==
Some generally similar positions in governments worldwide include:

- Auditor General of Pakistan
- Comptroller General of the United States
- Supreme Chamber of Control of the Republic of Poland
- State Auditor of Mississippi
- Japanese Board of Audit
- Comptroller and Auditor General
- State Comptroller of Israel
