= Cohabitation (government) =

System of divided government

Cohabitation is a system of divided government that occurs in semi-presidential systems, such as France, whenever the president is from a different political party than the majority of the members of parliament. It occurs because such a system forces the president to name a prime minister who will be acceptable to the majority party within parliament. Thus, cohabitation occurs because of the duality of the executive: an independently elected president and a prime minister who must be acceptable both to the president and to the legislature.

== France ==
Cohabitation took place in France in 1986–1988, 1993–1995, and 1997–2002. The president faced an opposition majority in the National Assembly and had to select his government from them.

=== Origins ===
Cohabitation was a product of the French Fifth Republic, albeit an unintended one. This constitution brought together a president with considerable executive powers and a prime minister, an executive responsible before Parliament. The president's task was primarily to end deadlock and act decisively to avoid the stagnation prevalent under the French Fourth Republic; the prime minister, similarly, was to "direct the work of government", providing a strong leadership to the legislative branch and to help overcome partisan squabbles.

Since 1962, French presidents have been elected by popular vote, replacing the electoral college, which was only used once. This change was intended to give Fifth Republic presidents more power than they might have had under the original constitution. While still seen as the symbol and embodiment of the nation, the president also was given a popular mandate. Of course, the majority party of the National Assembly retained power as well, but since the popularly elected president appointed the prime minister, the former was seen as having the upper hand in any conflict between executive and legislature. Furthermore, the imbalance is further illustrated by the fact that the president can dissolve the Assembly at any time (but not more than once in a year), whereas the legislature has no powers of removal against the president.

The sole caveat to this position of presidential pre-eminence was that the president's selection to the premiership required approval by the National Assembly, the lower house of parliament: because the assembly can dismiss the government by a vote of no confidence, it follows that the prime minister must command a majority in the assembly. This was not a problem whilst the legislative majority was aligned with the president, and indeed, de Gaulle, who was responsible for inspiring much of the Constitution, envisioned that the president would resign if the people disavowed him in an assembly election, and would then elect a new president (there is no vice-president in France) and a new election takes places less than two months after a resignation, a new president being elected for a new, full term; that happened in 1969, when de Gaulle resigned because the people voted against a referendum proposed by him.

The first "near miss" with cohabitation occurred with the election of Socialist President François Mitterrand in 1981. A right-wing coalition headed by the Gaullist Rally for the Republic controlled the assembly at the time. Almost immediately, Mitterrand exercised his authority to call assembly elections, and the electorate returned an assembly with an absolute majority of Socialists, ending the presumed crisis.

However, when assembly elections were held as required in 1986, five years later, the Socialists lost their majority to the right. Mitterrand decided to remain president, beginning the first cohabitation.

=== Cohabitation in practice ===
There have been only three periods of cohabitation, but each is notable for illustrating the oscillation of powers between the president and prime minister.

==== Mitterrand–Chirac period (1986–1988) ====
After the 1986 assembly elections, Mitterrand was forced to nominate as a Prime Minister Jacques Chirac, the leader of Rally for the Republic (RPR), the largest party in the majority coalition. Throughout the cohabitation between Mitterrand and Chirac, the president focused on his foreign duties and allowed Chirac to control internal affairs. Since Mitterrand was distanced from these policies, Chirac began to reverse many of Mitterrand's reforms by lowering taxes and privatising many national enterprises. There were, however, tense moments, such as when Mitterrand refused to sign ordonnances, slowing down reforms by requiring Chirac to pass his bills through parliament. This lasted for two years until 1988 when the newly reelected Mitterrand called for new legislative elections that were won by a leftist majority, which lasted five years.

==== Mitterrand–Balladur period (1993–1995) ====
In 1993, President Mitterrand found himself in a similar position when the right won an 80% majority in the National Assembly elections. Once again, he was forced to appoint an opposition member from the RPR and Union for French Democracy (UDF) parties. This time he appointed Édouard Balladur to the post of prime minister, because Chirac was focused on running for president instead of being prime minister for the third time. Balladur maintained this post through the cohabitation until May 18, 1995 when Jacques Chirac took office as president.

==== Chirac–Jospin period (1997–2002) ====
In 1995, rightist leader Jacques Chirac succeeded Mitterrand as president, and, since the right had a majority in the assembly, he was able to appoint his fellow RPR member Alain Juppé as his prime minister, ending cohabitation by a change in the presidency. This alignment of president and assembly should have lasted until at least the normally scheduled 1998 assembly elections.

However, in 1997, President Chirac dissolved parliament and called for early legislative elections. This ended the right-wing assembly majority, and Chirac was forced to appoint Socialist Lionel Jospin to the premiership. Jospin remained prime minister until the elections of 2002, making this third term of cohabitation the longest ever, one of five years. Chirac called this a state of 'paralysis', and found it particularly difficult to arrange campaign activities for the National Assembly.

With Jospin holding the premiership, Chirac's political influence was constrained and he had no say over certain major reforms being instituted by the left-wing majority. This included the 1998 legislation to shorten the working week from 39 to 35 hours, which came into effect in 2000.

=== Observations ===
Arend Lijphart contends that the French Fifth Republic usually operates under a presidential system, but when in cohabitation, this effectively changes, at least in terms of domestic policy, to a parliamentary system, in which the prime minister controls the legislative agenda and the president's powers are limited to foreign policy and defence.

A common problem during cohabitation is that each leader wants his or her own policies to be carried out so that the public is positive toward their strategies, and he or she will be elected when the time comes. Because each party is in competition, there is little room for progression since the friction between both sides holds each other back. Whilst leaders of the same political spectrum help each other in decision-making when in power concurrently, cohabitation can lead to a decline in national authority and make the country appear outwardly insecure.

Although originally believed to be improbable, France was governed under a cohabitation of leaders for almost half the period from 1986 to 2006, suggesting that French people no longer fear the prospect of having two parties share power.

=== Future prospects ===
In 2000, at the initiative of prime minister Lionel Jospin and against the will of president Jacques Chirac, the term of a president was shortened from seven years to five years, a change accepted by a referendum. Furthermore, since 2002, legislative elections were now held roughly a month after presidential ones, thus creating a coattail effect that encourages those who won the presidential election to confirm their vote in the legislative elections.

The near-simultaneity of presidential and legislative elections makes cohabitation less likely by reducing the prospect of major changes in public opinion between the two elections, but cohabitation remains a possibility even if public opinion remains stable. For example, a group of voters (e.g. voters on the left) may be split between two or more presidential candidates, thus making it unlikely that any of this group's candidates wins the presidential election, but these coordination problems may be resolved in the legislative election, leading to a different outcome in the two elections. Alternatively, a party that wins a majority of support in both the presidential and legislative elections may nonetheless fail to control the National Assembly because that support is distributed unequally across legislative districts. In another scenario, a presidential candidate from a new party may win the presidency despite his party not having the candidates or the party apparatus to win legislative elections.

Cohabitation can also occur if the presidential and legislative elections occur at different times due to extraordinary circumstances. For example, the president can dissolve the Assembly and call for new elections mid-term, as Emmanuel Macron did in 2024, which could theoretically lead to a different party winning. The president could also die, be incapacitated, resign, or be impeached during his term, leading to a new presidential election. Cohabitation could result, although the new president would then be likely to call new assembly elections.

== Elsewhere in Europe ==
=== Czech Republic ===
While the framers of the Constitution of the Czech Republic intended to set up a parliamentary system, with the prime minister as the country's leading political figure and the de facto chief executive and the president as a ceremonial head of state (and indeed, the Czech president was initially indirectly elected by Parliament), the stature of the first president, Václav Havel, was such that the office acquired greater influence than the framers intended. This presidential influence was further increased after the introduction of direct presidential elections in 2013, and the resulting attempts by the first directly-elected president, Miloš Zeman, to form governments of his own liking irrespective of the balance of power in Parliament, and thus, the political dynamics which allow for cohabitation emerged even though the presidency remained formally weak.

There have been two periods of cohabitation in the Czech Republic, involving two presidents and two prime ministers:

Zeman-Sobotka cohabitation (2014–2017)
In June 2013, shortly after Miloš Zeman assumed office, the coalition government led by Petr Nečas collapsed due to a corruption and spying scandal. Zeman, ignoring the political balance of power in the Czech Parliament, appointed his friend and long-term ally Jiří Rusnok as Prime Minister, and tasked him with forming a new government. This was described in parts of the Czech and foreign media as a political power grab, undermining parliamentary democracy and expanding his powers. As Rusnok's government did not enjoy a parliamentary majority, it was deposed in a vote of no confidence, resulting in snap elections which were won by the Czech Social Democratic Party (ČSSD). After these elections, Zeman again attempted to influence the government formation process, this time by fostering a divide in the ČSSD: Zeman held a secret meeting with high-ranking ČSSD members led by Michal Hašek (Note: Alongside Hašek, this included deputies Milan Chovanec, Zdeněk Škromach, Jeroným Tejc, and Jiří Zimola) to plot the removal of the ČSSD's party leader, Bohuslav Sobotka. Hašek initially denied the accusations, stating on Czech Television that "there was no meeting"; however, his allies later admitted that the meeting took place. The event sparked public protests in the country and eventually led to Hašek apologising and resigning his position in the party, while Sobotka became prime minister of the post-election government.

Pavel-Babiš cohabitation (2025–present)
After the 2025 Czech parliamentary election, former communist soldier and general, President Petr Pavel had to appoint Andrej Babiš, his rival from the 2023 presidential election and leader of ANO 2011, as the Prime Minister of the Czech Republic.

=== Finland ===
The Constitution of Finland, as written in 1918, was originally similar to the French system of 40 years later. It included explicit provisions that the president focuses on national security and international relations. The arrangement was a compromise between monarchists and parliamentarians. In essence, a strong presidency was adopted instead of a constitutional monarchy. The new constitution of 2000 reduced the power of the president by transferring the power to choose a prime minister to the parliament. Cohabitation has occurred frequently, as Finland has multiple powerful parties which are not highly polarized between left and right, and also since the terms of a parliament are shorter (four years) than the presidential terms (six years). Theoretically, the president should remain strictly non-partisan, and presidents have usually formally renounced party membership while in office.

=== Georgia ===
Georgia underwent a period of cohabitation from 2012 to 2013, occasioned by the defeat of the ruling United National Movement party by the opposition Georgian Dream coalition in the 2012 parliamentary election. At the same time, a new constitutional system came into effect and the leader of the defeated party, the incumbent President Mikheil Saakashvili, had to appoint the Georgian Dream leader, Bidzina Ivanishvili, as prime minister. According to the European Commission report, with the expiration of Saakashvili's two terms as president and the victory of the Georgian Dream candidate, Giorgi Margvelashvili, in the 2013 presidential election, Georgia completed a complex and peaceful transition from a presidential to a parliamentary system. The period of cohabitation was assessed in the same report as "uneasy but functioning."

=== Poland ===
There have been seven periods of cohabitation in Poland, involving six presidents and seven prime ministers:

Jaruzelski-Mazowiecki cohabitation (1989–1990)
In the partly free 1989 Polish parliamentary election, the opposition Solidarity Citizens' Committee won all the freely-contested seats in the Sejm (35% of the total membership); the remaining 65% were reserved to the ruling Patriotic Movement for National Rebirth, consisting of the Polish United Workers' Party (PZPR) and its satellite parties, the United People's Party (ZSL) and the Alliance of Democrats (SD). In a July article entitled "Your President, Our Prime Minister," leading Solidarity member Adam Michnik proposed a grand coalition between Solidarity and reformist elements in PRON, in exchange for the former's support for the election of PZPR general secretary Wojciech Jaruzelski as president (the president was to be elected by a joint session of parliament). Although this proposal was not initially followed - Jaruzelski was elected president by a narrow majority and without support from Solidarity, and attempted to appoint fellow PZPR member Czesław Kiszczak as Prime Minister - Solidarity convinced the ZSL and SD to break away from the PZPR and join it in a majority coalition; as a result, Kiszczak was dismissed by a vote of no confidence and replaced by Solidarity's Tadeusz Mazowiecki, who proceeded to form a Solidarity-PRON grand coalition government in accordance with Michnik's proposal. Eventually, on 6 July 1990, the PZPR withdrew from the coalition, leaving the government as a coalition of Solidarity, ZSL and SD only; president Jaruzelski continued to serve until December, when he resigned to allow direct presidential elections to take place; these elections were won by Solidarity leader Lech Wałęsa, ending the period of cohabitation.

Wałęsa-Pawlak/Oleksy cohabitation (1993–1995)
A parliamentary election was held in September 1993, which led to the formation of a coalition government between the Democratic Left Alliance (SLD) and the Polish People's Party (PSL); the party formed by president Wałęsa to contest these elections, the Nonpartisan Bloc for Support of Reforms (BBWR), was relegated to the opposition. The relations between the two coalition partners were fraught, and Pawlak was replaced as prime minister by the SLD's Józef Oleksy in a Cabinet reshuffle, with the SLD-PSL coalition retained. This period of cohabitation ended in December 1995, when President Wałęsa was defeated by Aleksander Kwaśniewski of the SLD in the presidential election.

Kwaśniewski-Buzek cohabitation (1997–2001)
At the 1997 parliamentary election, the SLD-PSL coalition lost its majority, which was taken by a new coalition between Solidarity Electoral Action (AWS) and the Freedom Union (UW), and headed by AWS' Jerzy Buzek as Prime Minister. In 2000, the Freedom Union withdrew from the coalition, leaving Buzek at the head of a single-party minority government; this government was defeated at the 2001 parliamentary election, where the SLD returned to government, forming a coalition with the PSL and the Labour Union (UP). During this cohabitation, president Kwaśniewski was re-elected in a landslide at the 2000 presidential election.

Kwaśniewski-Marcinkiewicz cohabitation (2005)
The 2005 parliamentary election marked a heavy defeat for the SLD, with a large center-right majority between two new parties, the right-wing Law and Justice (PiS) and the centrist Civic Platform (PO). Although a coalition between the two parties was predicted to form after these elections, PiS opted instead for a minority government which enjoys confidence and supply from the PSL. In addition, PiS leader Jarosław Kaczyński declined the prime ministership, fearing it would harm his brother Lech's chances at the presidential election later that year. Instead, a lesser-known PiS politician, Kazimierz Marcinkiewicz, became prime minister. This period of cohabitation waa very brief due to Lech Kaczyński's election as president. PiS eventually formed a majority coalition with Self-Defence of the Republic of Poland (SRP) and the League of Polish Families (LPR). Marcinkiewicz would later resign the premiership in 2006 to be replaced by Jarosław Kaczyński.

Kaczyński-Tusk cohabitation (2007–2010)
A snap parliamentary election was called in 2007, following the breakdown of the PiS-SRP-LPR coalition government over corruption scandals. This snap election yielded a majority for PO and PSL, who formed a majority coalition with PO's Donald Tusk - president Lech Kaczyński's rival in the 2005 presidential elections - as prime minister. The relations between president Kaczyński and prime minister Tusk were very fraught, with the two constantly battling each other over who should represent Poland on the international stage. This cohabitation was brought to an end with president Kaczyński's death in the Smolensk air disaster; Kaczyński's death in office caused the 2010 presidential election to be brought forward by three months. PO's Bronisław Komorowski, who already served as acting president following Kaczyński's death, was elected president in his own right.

Duda-Kopacz cohabitation (2015)
In the 2015 presidential election, incumbent president Bronisław Komorowski was defeated in his attempt to gain a second term by PiS' Andrzej Duda. This cohabitation was brief, as the parliamentary election later that year resulted in PiS obtaining a single-party majority in the Sejm.

Duda/Nawrocki-Tusk cohabitation (2023–present)
Although the 2023 parliamentary election resulted in PiS losing its parliamentary majority, President Andrzej Duda tried to reappoint incumbent Prime Minister Mateusz Morawiecki to a minority government. Two weeks later Morawiecki lost a no-confidence vote, and parliament appointed former Prime Minister Donald Tusk to a majority government, consisting of PO, the PSL, Poland 2050 (PL2050), and the New Left (NL; successor party of the SLD), and enjoying confidence and supply from the democratic socialist Left Together (RAZEM). After 2025 Polish presidential election, Andrzej Duda was succeeded by another PiS-affiliated president, conservative IPN President Karol Nawrocki.

=== Romania ===
The 2012 Romanian political crisis was a major political conflict between Prime Minister Victor Ponta of the Social Democratic Party and the centre-right President Traian Băsescu, after the former was asked to form a government in May 2012. The dispute degenerated into civil disobedience and alleged democratic backsliding, lasting until the two sides signed an agreement on institutional cohabitation in December.

There have been four periods of cohabitation in Romania, involving two presidents and five prime ministers.

Băsescu-Tăriceanu cohabitation (2007–2008)
This cohabitation occurred owing to the dismissal of the ministers belonging to the Democratic Party (PD), which had supported President Băsescu's candidacy, and which had counted Băsescu among its members before his election in 2004, in April 2007. This dismissal led to the formation of the second Tăriceanu government, comprising the National Liberal Party (PNL) and the Democratic Union of Hungarians in Romania (UDMR). The coalition government, while commanding a minority of MPs, was externally supported by the Social Democratic Party (PSD). Tăriceanu's term as prime minister ended in December 2008, following the legislative election the previous month, thus ending the cohabitation.

Băsescu-Ponta cohabitation (2012–2014)
The cohabitation between President Băsescu and Prime Minister Ponta began after the successful vote of no confidence against the government led by Mihai Răzvan Ungureanu, which was supported by the Democratic Liberal Party (PDL), the National Union for the Progress of Romania (UNPR) and the Democratic Union of Hungarians in Romania (UDMR). A new government took office, which included the Social Democratic Party (PSD) and the National Liberal Party (PNL) in May 2012, under the leadership of Victor Ponta. Ponta's first term in office was marked by a major political crisis between him and President Băsescu, leading up to the suspension of the latter and an impeachment referendum in July 2012. The new parliamentary majority was reinforced after the legislative election in December 2012, as the Social Liberal Union (USL) obtained a supermajority of seats. The alliance eventually dissolved in February 2014. This period of cohabitation ended in December 2014, when President Băsescu left office, being replaced by Klaus Iohannis.

Iohannis-Ponta cohabitation (2014–2015)
President Klaus Iohannis began his term as President in December 2014, having won the presidential election a month before ahead of the incumbent prime minister, Victor Ponta. Since a legislative election was not held, the parliamentary majority was unchanged, and Ponta was able to remain as prime minister, despite his loss. Victor Ponta resigned in November 2015, being replaced by Dacian Cioloș.

Iohannis-Grindeanu/Tudose/Dăncilă cohabitation (2017–2019)
A legislative election was held in December 2016, which led to the formation of a coalition government, including the Social Democratic Party (PSD) and the Alliance of Liberals and Democrats (ALDE). The leader of the Social Democratic Party, Liviu Dragnea, took the office of president of the Chamber of Deputies, while Sorin Grindeanu assumed the position of prime minister. Grindeanu was eventually dismissed by a vote of no confidence due to tensions within the governing coalition in June 2017, and he was replaced by incumbent economy minister Mihai Tudose, of the same party. The new government comprised the same parties which had participated in the Grindeanu government. Tudose chose to resign in January 2018, due to tensions within the governing coalition. Viorica Dăncilă, a member of the European Parliament representing the Social Democratic Party, assumed the office of prime minister after Tudose's resignation. She was the first female head of government of Romania. Dăncilă lost a vote of no confidence in November 2019, and President Iohannis subsequently appointed Ludovic Orban of his own former National Liberal Party to lead a minority government.

=== Russia ===
In Russia, the State Duma has to approve a prime minister chosen by the president. However, if the State Duma rejects the president's candidate(s) three times in a row the President has the right to dissolve the State Duma and call legislative elections, but he cannot do so within a year after the last election, which in this period may lead to cohabitation.

Yeltsin-Primakov cohabitation (1998–1999)
Though the Russian system of government makes cohabitation unlikely, it can occur when in the State Duma there is no stable majority loyal to the president. Thus, cohabitation evolved between 1998 and 1999, when the State Duma twice refused to appoint Viktor Chernomyrdin as prime minister. However, since the appointment of the new prime minister was caused by the recent default, there was a risk that the opposition would improve its result after the snap election, which in turn would lead to even more tension between President Boris Yeltsin and the State Duma, especially since at this time preparations for the impeachment process were already underway. In consequence, Boris Yeltsin had to nominate Yevgeny Primakov for prime minister, who had broad support among the left opposition.

=== Ukraine ===
A cohabitation in a semi-presidential system also existed in Ukraine between 2006 and 2010. After 2006 Ukrainian parliamentary election, Ukrainian President Viktor Yushchenko had to appoint Viktor Yanukovych, his rival from the 2004 presidential election, as prime minister in August 2006.

== Asia ==
=== Palestinian National Authority ===
The Palestinian National Authority, a quasi-governmental organization responsible for administering the Palestinian territories, has operated within the framework of a semi-presidential republic since the creation of the office of prime minister in the spring of 2003. While the president has the power to appoint anyone as prime minister, there was an unspoken agreement upon the establishment of the office that the prime minister would be appointed from the majority party in the Legislative Council. This arrangement led to a period of cohabitation after the 2006 legislative election, in which Fatah President Mahmoud Abbas appointed Hamas leader Ismail Haniyeh prime minister after Hamas' victory in the elections. The cohabitation did not last long, however, as funds were withheld from the Palestinian Authority and hostilities between Fatah and Hamas broke out in December 2006, leading to the appointment of a caretaker government led by Salam Fayyad on June 14, 2007.

=== Sri Lanka ===
Sri Lankan politics for several years witnessed a bitter struggle between the president and the prime minister, belonging to different parties and elected separately, over the negotiations with the LTTE to resolve the longstanding civil war. Since 1978, Sri Lanka transferred from parliamentary system to semi-presidential system, which the president has more executive power.

== Other countries ==
Cohabitation does not occur within standard presidential systems. While a number of presidential democracies, such as the United States, have seen power shared between a president and legislature of different political parties, this is another form of divided government. In this situation, the executive is directed by a president of one party who serves for a fixed term of years, even if and while the legislature is controlled by another party; in cohabitation, by contrast, executive power is divided between a president of one party and a cabinet of another party. Cohabitation thus only occurs in systems that have both parliamentary government (i.e. ministers accountable to parliament) and a directly elected executive president, i.e., semi-presidential systems. In a true parliamentary system, the head of state, whether president or constitutional monarch, has no significant influence over the government.

As seen above, the theory of cohabitation is no longer limited to France. However, there are not many countries where the constitutional structure exists in which it could occur. Since some of the new democracies of eastern Europe have adopted institutions quite similar to France, cohabitation may become more common, but if those countries elect their executives and legislature at or near the same time, as France is now doing, then cohabitation will be less likely.

== See also ==
- Coalition government
- Grand coalition
- National unity government
- Divided government in the United States
