= 2013 Czech political corruption scandal =

Government crisis resulting in resignation of the prime minister

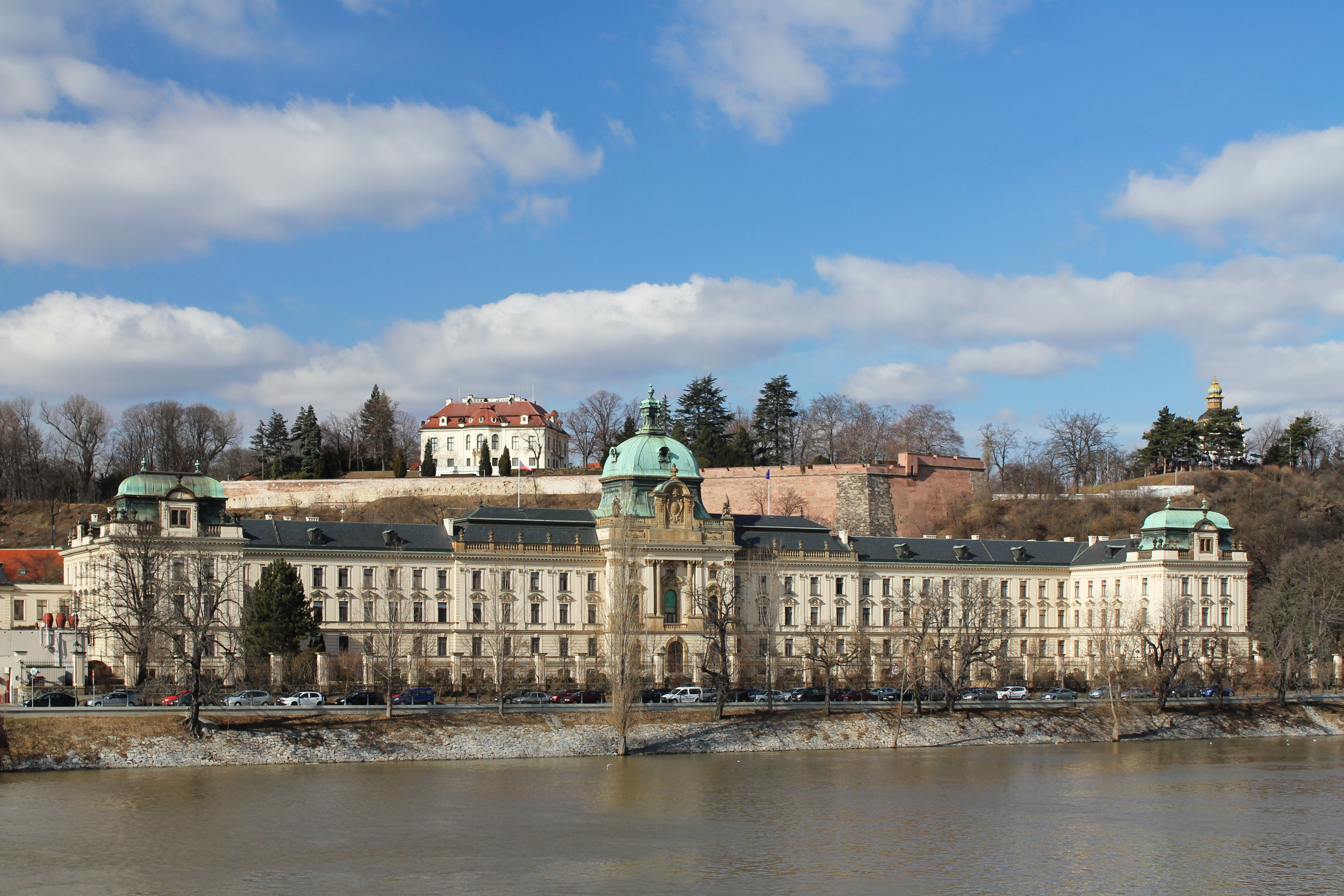
The Straka Academy, seat of the Government of the Czech Republic, was raided by police.

The 2013 Czech political corruption scandal started with a raid against organized crime which was conducted in the Czech Republic in June 2013 by the Police Unit for Combating Organized Crime (Czech: Útvar pro odhalování organizovaného zločinu, ÚOOZ) and the Chief Public Prosecutor's Office (Vrchní státní zastupitelství) in Olomouc. It involved several highly positioned state officers and politicians, as well as controversial entrepreneurs and lobbyists. The scandal affected the top levels of Czech politics, including Prime Minister Petr Nečas and his coalition government. On 17 June 2013, it resulted in the resignation of the Prime Minister and the cabinet. Nečas also quit as leader of the Civic Democratic Party (ODS).

== Overview ==
The investigation of the case started in early 2012, according to Robert Šlachta, the head of the Unit for Combating Organized Crime. Ivo Ištvan, the Chief Public Prosecutor in Olomouc, confirmed that a total of 400 policemen were deployed in the raid.

On 13 June 2013, some of the closest advisors and collaborators of the Czech Prime Minister, including Jana Nagyová, Managing Director of the Section of the Prime Minister of the Czech Republic's Cabinet, and Lubomír Poul, Director of the Office of the Government, were arrested in association with unspecified misconduct. Ondrej Páleník, former head of the Military Intelligence Service; Milan Kovanda, current head of the Military Intelligence Service; Ivan Fuksa, former Minister, and Petr Tluchoř, former Deputy, were among the arrested as well. The seat of the Government of the Czech Republic and offices of several influential Prague lobbyists were raided by police. The whereabouts of Petr Nečas after the arrests were not known, however, later he announced that his confidence in Nagyová "had not decreased". He also denied speculation about his resignation.

On 14 June 2013, the Unit for Combating Organized Crime and the Chief Public Prosecutor's Office in Olomouc announced that Nagyová and members of the Military Intelligence Service had been accused of abuse of power and corruption. Nagyová, one of the closest collaborators of the Prime Minister, allegedly misused the Intelligence Service to monitor Nečas' wife (among others) without the official approval of the Defence Minister in late 2012. Her motives were, according to the police, purely private. Petr Nečas was in divorce proceedings when the scandal erupted.

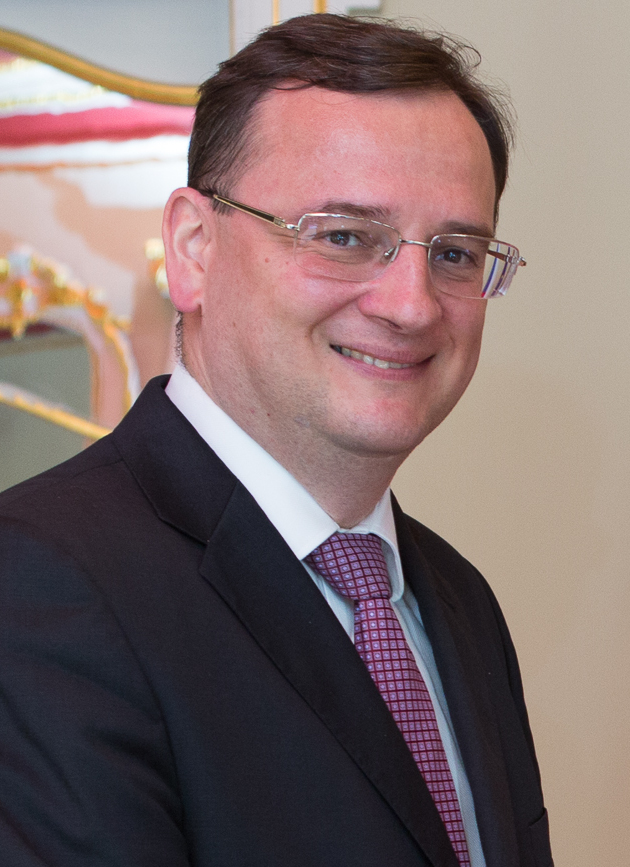
Czech Prime Minister Petr Nečas resigned to his office due to this affair (pictured in May 2013, one month before the raid)

Additionally, the investigation targeted an organized group of lobbyists and state officers attempting to influence state institutions for their own enrichment. The Unit for Combating Organized Crime confiscated around CZK 120–150m ($7.8m) in cash and tens of kilograms of gold during the raid. Eight people were charged with various offences.

Nečas, under pressure from opposition parties and politicians, repeated his refusal to resign. He issued an apology for the actions of Jana Nagyová and denied that he was aware of it. He also announced her retirement from the office. ČSSD, the major opposition party, announced its intention to invoke a vote of no confidence on 18 June 2013.

On 15 June, the District Court in Ostrava decided to take into custody Nagyová, Páleník, Tluchoř, Fuksa, Jan Pohůnek, former employee of the Military Intelligence Service, Marek Šnajdr, former Deputy, and Roman Boček, former employee of the Ministry of Agriculture. Lubomír Poul was not charged and Milan Kovanda was released.

On 16 June 2013, Petr Nečas announced that he would resign on Monday, 17 June 2013. "I am fully aware of how the ups and downs of my personal life currently burden the political scene and ODS ... I want to emphasize that I'm aware of my political responsibility and I draw the consequences from that", he said.

On 16 July 2013, the Supreme Court of the Czech Republic in Brno decided in favour of three former members of the Chamber of Deputies of the Czech Republic, Ivan Fuksa, Marek Šnajdr and Petr Tluchoř, on the grounds of their parliamentary immunity at the time of their involvement in the case. The three named persons were released from prison. Jana Nagyová and the other suspects were released from custody on 19 July 2013. According to the court, the danger of influencing witnesses has passed, as key witnesses have already been interrogated.

According to the Czech news websites, Nečas married Nagyová on 21 September 2013.

In February 2014, Nečas was charged with bribery.

== Progress in further years ==
The case of the misuse of the Military Intelligence Service was tried by the District Court of Prague 1 starting in November 2014. During the trial Petr Nečas himself admitted he requested monitoring of his wife Radka Necasova in 2012 due to security risks connected with his role as PM.

On 29 May 2015 the court acquitted all persons charged (including Jana Nagyová and military intelligence officers) of those particular charges while saying the monitoring of later PM's spouse was not considered to be illegal wrongdoing.

The public prosecutor refused the outcome and appealed immediately after the court's statement. The appellate court (the Regional Court of Prague) reviewed the trial in April 2016 and annulled it because the District Court had overlooked some evidence. Another trial was held but on 17 June 2016, all charged persons were acquitted of their charges once again.

== Analysis and conclusions ==
According to the Czech media and political commentators, the case consists of several more or less related parts. A leaked police document based on wiretapping records indicates that spying on the Prime Minister's wife by his managing director was prompted by personal motives and that the relationship between Nagyová and Nečas was more than collegial. "We see a story that meets the quality parameters of a good Mexican telenovela", commented the newspaper Mladá fronta DNES.

The arrests and charging of several deputies were substantiated by the fact that they were rewarded by lucrative posts in exchange for their resignation and loyalty to the party (ODS) during an important parliamentary vote. While the police considers it to be a case of corruption, Nečas claims it was a standard political deal. Nečas found himself among the suspects, as he had promised and provided the bribe to the deputies.

The large police operation also focused on activities of influential Prague entrepreneurs and lobbyists, namely Roman Janoušek and Ivo Rittig. The investigative authorities raided their offices in association with suspicious activities related to investments made by the Magistrate of the Capital City of Prague and other state-controlled subjects. Both Janoušek and Rittig were outside the country at the time of the raid.

The police investigation was prompted by suspicion that Libor Grygárek, a former Deputy at the Chief Public Prosecutor's Office in Prague, was in connection with an organized group of entrepreneurs abusing state contracts (Janoušek and Rittig were among those suspected). Grygárek was neither arrested nor charged with any crime at that time. In December 2013, he was charged with misuse of power in 2009. In February 2014, Ivo Rittig was arrested and charged with money laundering in a separate case.
