= Nečas =

Nečas (masculine), Nečasová (feminine) is a Czech surname. Simplified form Necas. It may refer to:

- Jakub Nečas (born 1995), Czech footballer
- Jan Nečas (born 1977), Czech footballer
- Jaromír Nečas (1888–1945), Czech politician
- Martin Nečas (born 1999), Czech ice hockey player
- Petr Nečas (born 1964), Czech politician and former Prime Minister
- Radim Nečas (born 1969), Czech footballer
- Radim Nečas (footballer born 1988), Czech footballer
- Jana Nečasová (born 1964), former Czech politician and high civil servant

== See also ==
- Manuel Sousa a.k.a. Necas
