= 2005 Czech Social Democratic Party leadership election =

2005 ČSSD leadership election
- 26 March 2005
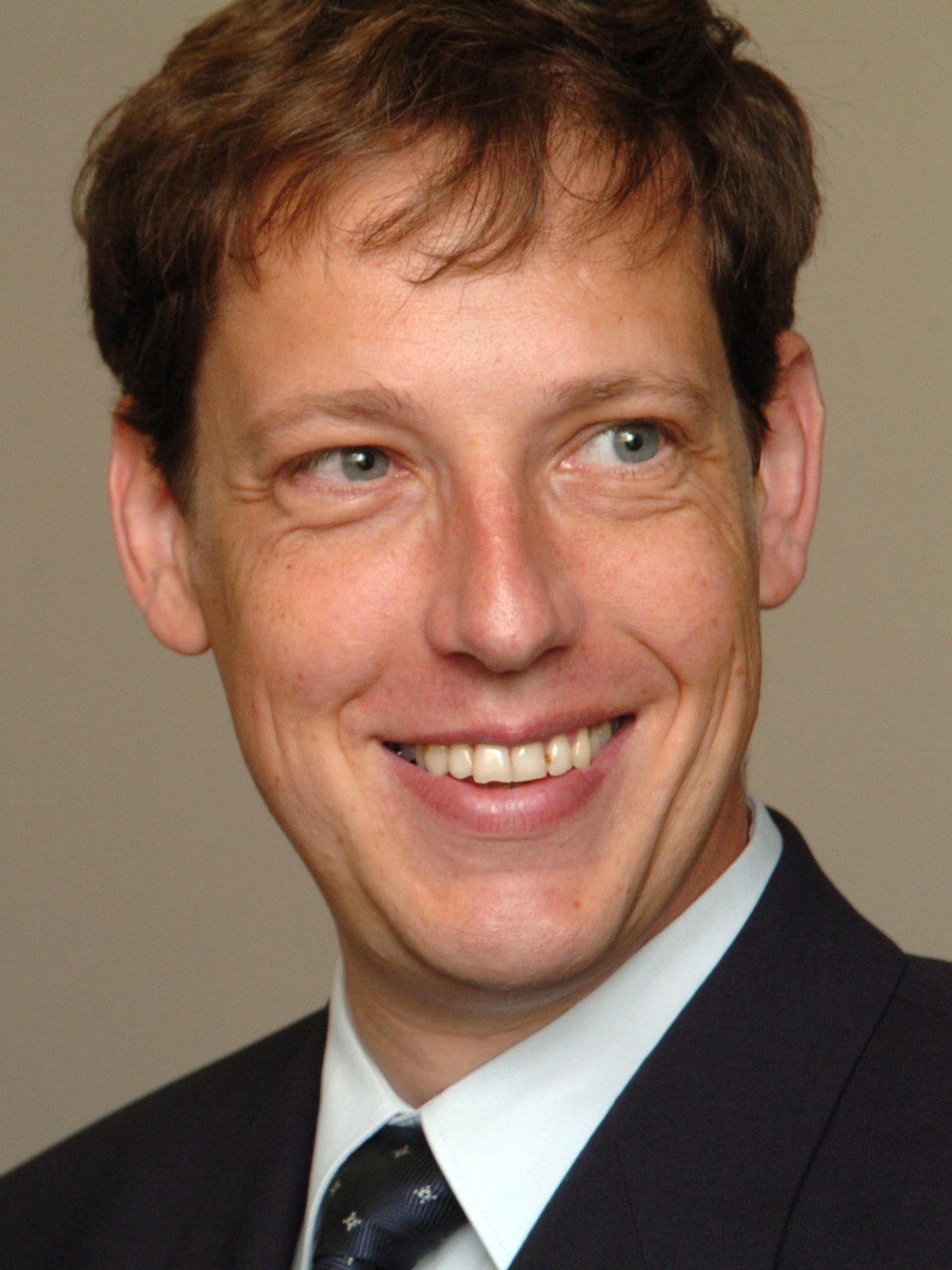

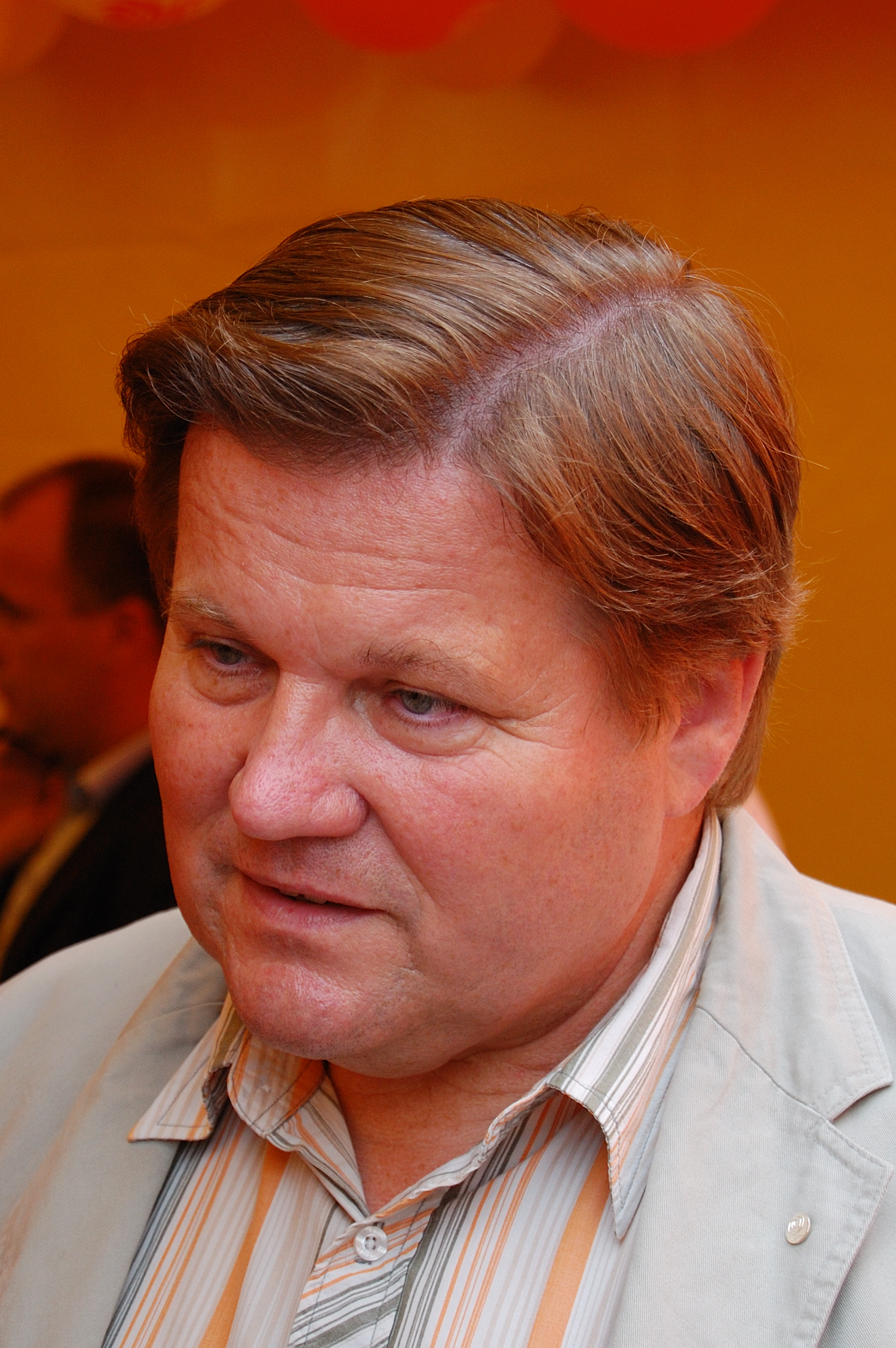
Candidate	Stanislav Gross	Zdeněk Škromach
Electoral vote	291	203
Percentage	58.9%	41.1%
Leader of ČSSD before election
Stanislav Gross (acting)
Elected Leader of ČSSD
Stanislav Gross

The Czech Social Democratic Party (ČSSD) leadership election of 2005 happened when incumbent Vladimír Špidla resigned as a result of party's poor performance in European Parliament election. Stanislav Gross and Zdeněk Škromach duelled in the election. Gross was front-runner and was endorsed by 12 regional organisations while Škromach was supported by only 1 region.

Gross defeated Škromach when he received votes of 291 delegates. 552 delegates were allowed to vote.

== Voting ==
Candidate	Vote	%
Stanislav Gross	291	58.9
Zdeněk Škromach	203	41.1
