= Kramář's Villa =

Official residence of the Prime Minister of the Czech Republic

Coordinates: 50°05′36″N 14°24′38″E

- Kramářova vila
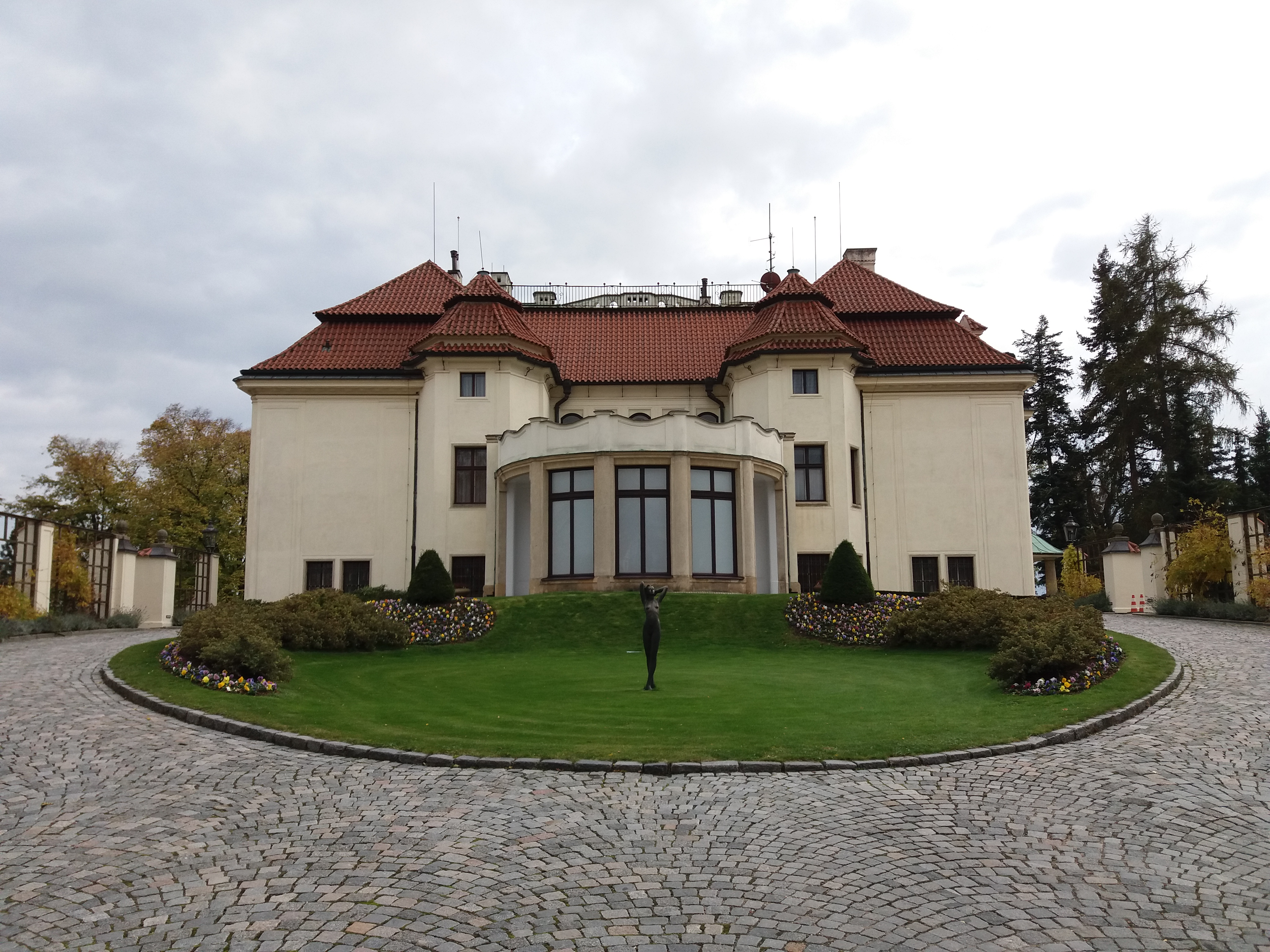
- Kramář's Villa
- Interactive map of the Kramář's Villa area

General information
- Architectural style: Neo-Baroque
- Location: Prague
- Current tenants: Prime Minister of the Czech Republic
- Construction started: 1911
- Completed: 1914

Design and construction
- Architect: Friedrich Ohmann

The Kramář's Villa (Czech: Kramářova vila) is the official residence of the prime minister of the Czech Republic. It is located in Prague, known for its panorama of Prague Castle. It was built in 1914 by the first prime minister of Czechoslovakia, Karel Kramář. Since 1998, the villa has been the official residence of the prime minister of the Czech Republic.

== Tenants ==
- Karel Kramář (1914–1938)
- Miloš Zeman (1998–2002)
- Vladimír Špidla (2002–2004)
- Stanislav Gross (2004–2005)
- Jiří Paroubek (2005–2007)
- Mirek Topolánek (2007–2009)
- Jan Fischer (2009–2010)
- Petr Nečas (2010–2013)
- Jiří Rusnok (2013–2014)
- Bohuslav Sobotka (2014–2017)
- Andrej Babiš (2017–2021, 2021–present)
- Petr Fiala (2021–2025)
