= NACEVI =

Content delivery network

NACEVI (NAtional CEnter for VIdeo) is a Czech content delivery network operated by Visual Unity. It is partially financed by the Czech government through the Czech Broadband Forum.

NACEVI serves Windows Media format for audio and video. It is transparent for use of digital rights management. Total streaming capacity is about 10 Gbit/s. Traffic management is optimised for the Czech republic.

Distribution for IPv6 is also available.
