= Šárka Grossová =

Czech entrepreneur (born 1969)

Spouse of the Prime Minister of the Czech Republic
- In role 4 August 2004 – 25 April 2005
- Prime Minister: Stanislav Gross
- Preceded by: Viktorie Špidlová
- Succeeded by: Zuzana Paroubková

Personal details
- Born: November 6, 1969 (age 56) Prague, Czechoslovakia (now Czech Republic)
- Spouse: Stanislav Gross (1996–2015)
- Children: Natálie Grossová; Denisa Grossová
- Occupation: entrepreneur

Šárka Grossová (born Bobysudová on 6 November 1969) is a Czech entrepreneur, whose husband Stanislav Gross was Prime Minister of the Czech Republic from August 2004 to April 2005. Her opaque business activities contributed to the resignation of her husband Stanislav Gross from the post in April 2005.

== Career ==
Šárka met Stanislav in the Chamber of Deputies, where she worked in the cafeteria and he was a freshman member of parliament. Her business career became successful just as her husband was becoming an influential MP and subsequently the prime minister of the Czech Republic, however, her rise in the business world became the subject of controversy.

In January 2004 Šárka set up a charitable foundation, Nadační fond Diamant dětem. However, by the end of year 2005, after Gross had resigned as Prime Minister, the foundation did not register any philanthropic activity, and Grossová was accused of attempting to use the foundation for public relations purposes. Musician Michal David was appointed as one of the three board members. David was the co-owner of the company Cleopatra Musical, which had been among the contributors of the company in 2004. The largest donor sent the foundation 500,000 CZK and asked the foundation to remain anonymous.

Grossová owns a $735,000 Hidden Bay condo in Miami, Florida.
