= 2010 Christian and Democratic Union – Czechoslovak People's Party leadership election =

2010 KDU-ČSL leadership election

- 20 November 2010
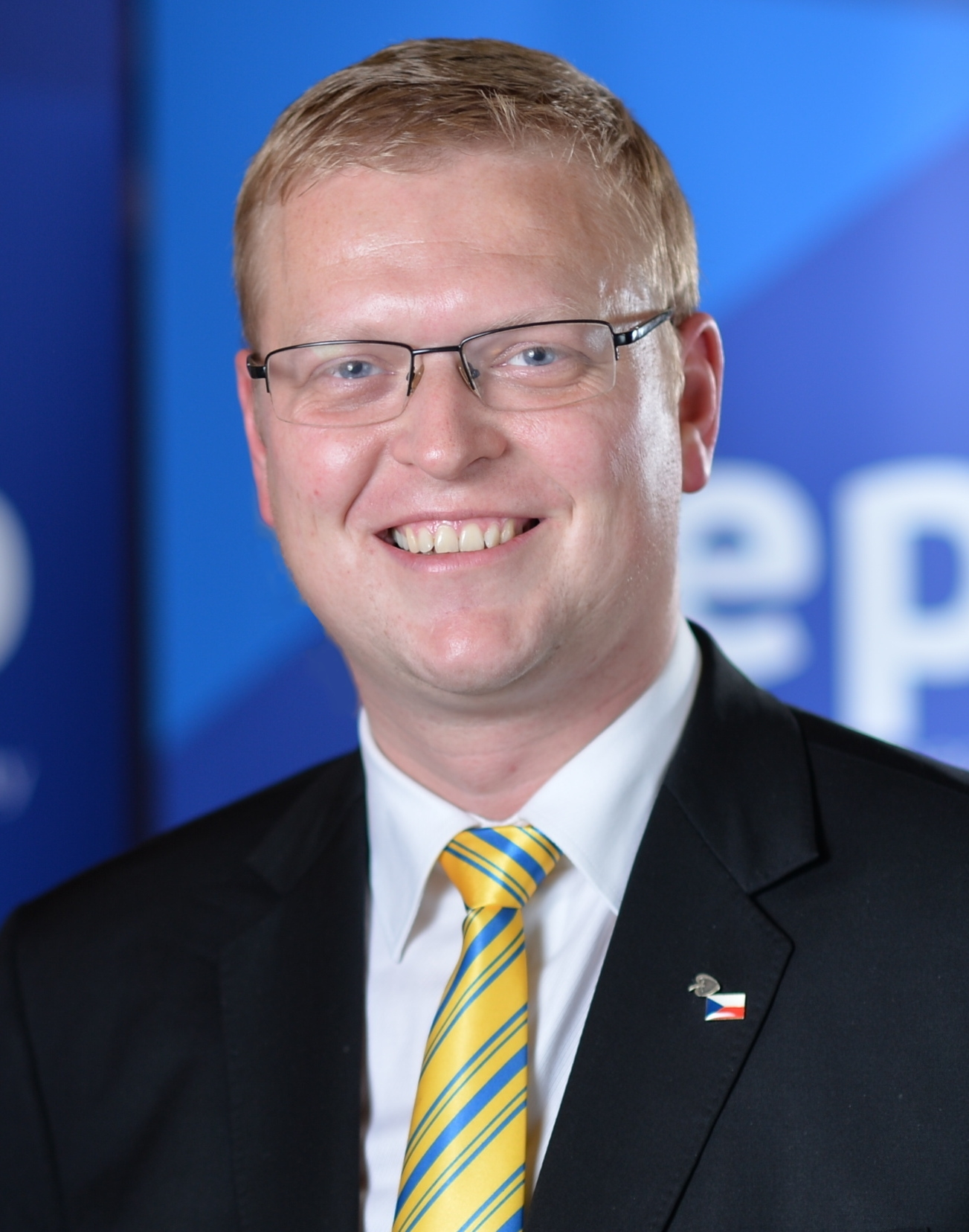

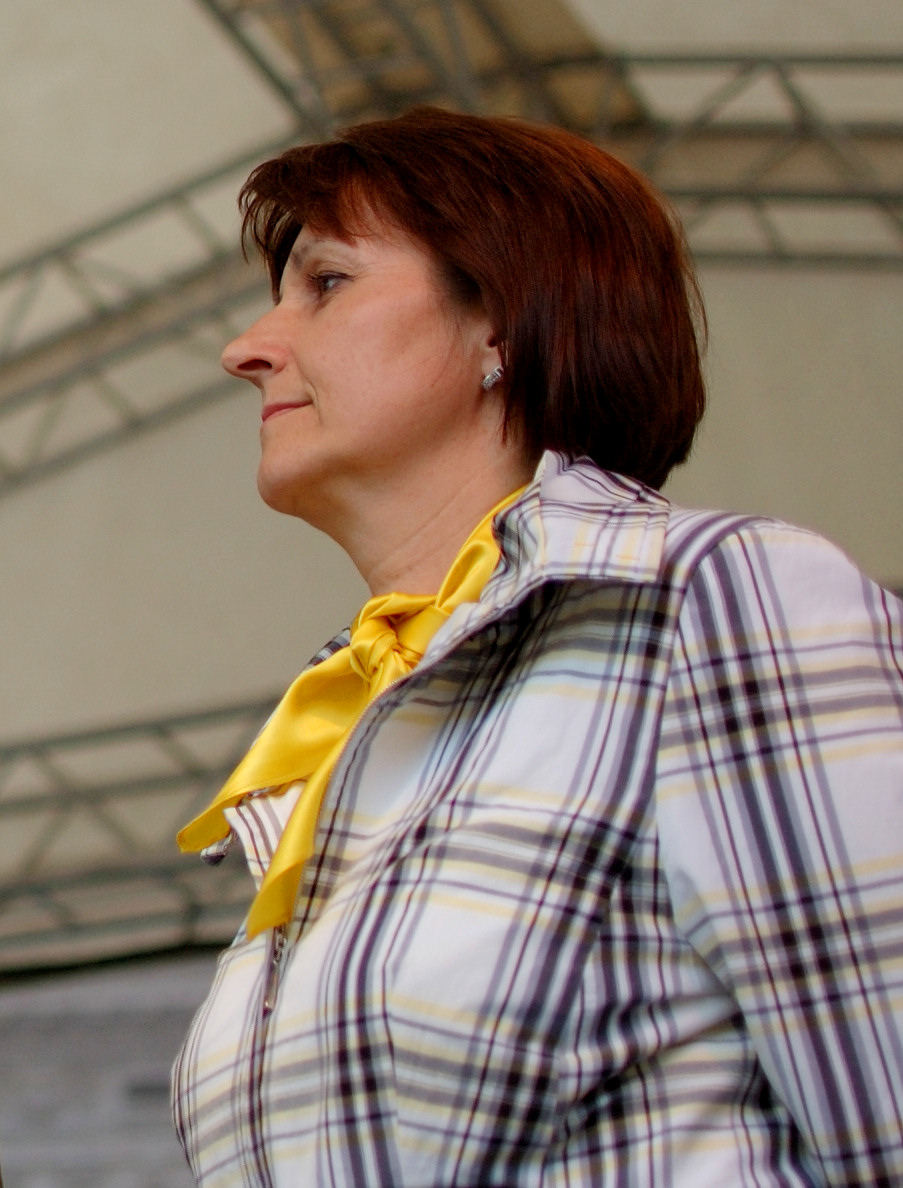

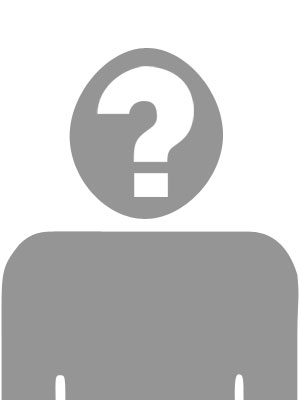

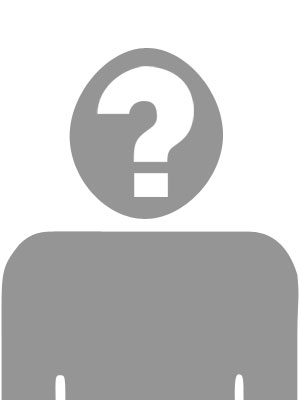
Candidate	Pavel Bělobrádek	Michaela Šojdrová	Ludvík Hovorka
Electoral vote	280	84	41
Percentage	65.9%	19.8%	9.6%
Candidate	Jaroslav Orel
Electoral vote	20
Percentage	4.7%
leader of KDU-ČSL before election
Michaela Šojdrová (acting)
Elected leader of KDU-ČSL
Pavel Bělobrádek

A leadership election for Christian and Democratic Union – Czechoslovak People's Party (KDU-ČSL) was held on 20 November 2010. Pavel Bělobrádek was elected leader of the party.

== Background ==
The election was held as a result of party's defeat in the 2010 legislative elections, in which the KDU-ČSL received less than 5% of the vote and failed to pass the electoral threshold. Then-leader Cyril Svoboda resigned and the party was temporarily headed by Michaela Šojdrová until the leadership election was held. Šojdrová originally did not plan to participate in the election, but later changed her mind and announced her candidature on 10 November 2010. Pavel Bělobrádek became his main rival. Other candidates were Jaroslav Orel and Jiřina Štouračová; Jiří Carbol also ran, but withdrew before voting began. A total of 459 delegates were allowed to vote.

== Results ==
Candidate	Votes	%
Pavel Bělobrádek	280	65.88
Michael Šojdrová	84	19.76
Ludvík Hovorka	41	9.65
Jaroslav Orel	20	4.71
Total	425	100
