= Roman Janoušek =

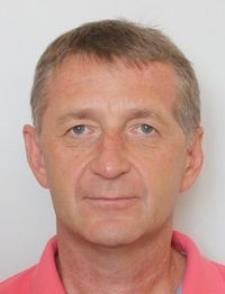
- Roman Janoušek's portrait; courtesy of the Police of the Czech Republic
- Born: 3 July 1968 (age 58)
- Occupations: businessman, lobbyist
- Title: JUDr.
- Spouse: Simona Janoušková
- Status: convicted
- Convictions: Assault, driving under the influence, Hit-and-run
- Criminal charges: Hit-and-run, driving under the influence, attempted murder
- Penalty: 4.5 years in prison

Roman Janoušek (born 3 July 1968) is a Czech businessman, lobbyist and convicted criminal. In November 2014 he started serving a 4.5-year sentence he received for his hit-and-run automobile accident in March 2012.

== Business activities ==
In June 1993 Janoušek co-founded Medea Real. He later made a lot of money in magazine publishing and real estate.

== Allegations of corruption ==
Janoušek has been under investigation regarding allegations of tender-rigging and bribery. It is also alleged that his friendship with Pavel Bém, mayor of Prague between 2002 and 2010, helped him in developing his business activities. He was one of the targets of the 2013 Czech political corruption scandal which led to the downfall of Prime Minister Petr Nečas and his coalition government.

== Hit-and-run ==
On April 30, 2014, Janoušek was handed a 3-year prison sentence for a hit-and-run accident that took place in Prague in March 2012. It is claimed that he had been driving drunk when he collided with another car. He ran over the 51-year-old woman driver causing grievous bodily harm when she attempted to stop him from leaving the scene. Janoušek faced ten years in prison. Both the prosecution and Janoušek appealed the verdict. The court eventually decided to increase Janoušek's prison sentence to 4.5 years and raised the term of his driving ban from 5 years to 7, stating that the injury sustained by the other driver was not the result of an accident but of a deliberate criminal act on the part of Janoušek. On November 18, 2014, Janoušek began serving his sentence in the Brno city jail. Both the prosecution and Janoušek appealed to the Supreme Court of the Czech Republic but the verdict was upheld on July 28, 2015.
