= National Security Council (Czech Republic) =

Czech Republic government group

National Security Council of the Czech Republic
- Bezpečnostní rada státu České republiky

Agency overview
- Formed: 1998
- Agency executive: Andrej Babiš, Prime Minister, Chairman; Karel Havlíček, Deputy prime minister, Vice chairman; Zuzana Mrázová, Minister of Regional Development
- Parent agency: Office of the Government of the Czech Republic
- Website: National Security Council website

The National Security Council of the Czech Republic (Czech: Bezpečnostní rada státu České republiky), abbreviated BRS is a governmental group of the Czech Republic charged with ensuring the security of the country.

== Order of the National Security Council ==
In accordance with Article 9 of Constitutional Act No 110/1998 on the security of the Czech Republic:

1. The National Security Council comprises the Prime Minister and other members of the Government in accordance with a Government decision.
2. The National Security Council, within the scope of authorization set by the Government, prepares draft measures for the Government concerning the safeguarding of the Czech Republic’s security.
3. The President of the Republic is entitled to attend meetings of the National Security Council, demand reports from the National Security Council and its members and to discuss issues with the National Security Council or its members which fall within their remit.
