= Jaromír Drábek =

Minister of Labour and Social Affairs of the Czech Republic from 2010 to 2012

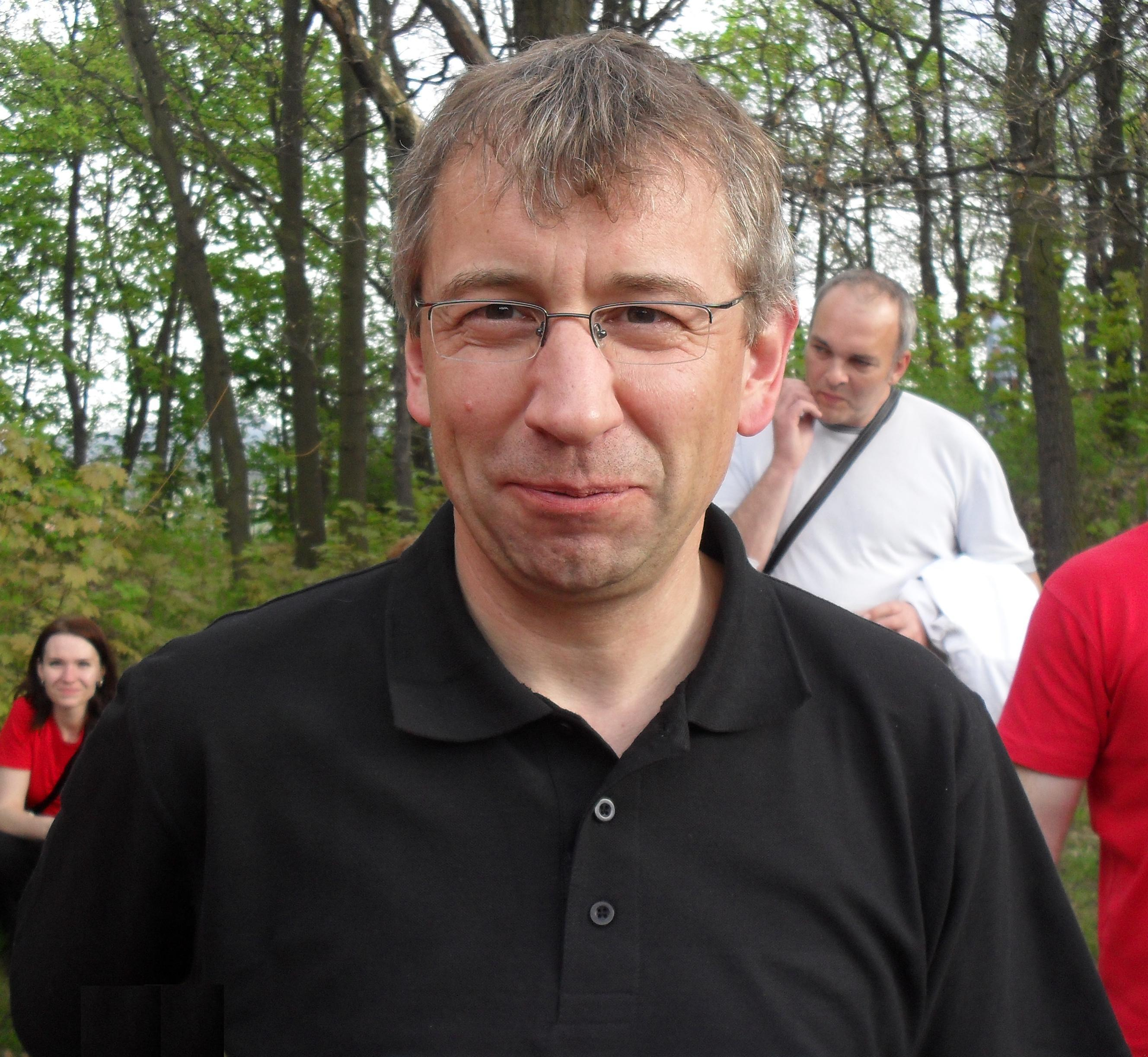

Minister of Labour and Social Affairs
- In office 13 July 2010 – 31 October 2012
- Prime Minister: Petr Nečas
- Preceded by: Petr Šimerka
- Succeeded by: Ludmila Müllerová

Member of the Chamber of Deputies
- In office 29 May 2010 – 28 August 2013

Personal details
- Born: 5 March 1965 (age 61) Jablonec nad Nisou, Czechoslovakia
- Party: TOP 09
- Spouse: Jindra Drábková

Jaromír Drábek (born 5 March 1965) is a Czech politician, who served as the Minister of Labour and Social Affairs from July 2010 to October 2012. He was also the Deputy Leader of the TOP 09.

Drábek studied engineering cybernetics at the Czech Technical University in Prague. Since graduation he worked in the Research Institute of Energetics (1988–1993). After that he began working in the Economic Chamber of Czech Republic and in years 2002–2008 he was the president of the Economic Chamber.

In 2009, Drábek entered the new political party TOP 09 and he was the leader of TOP 09 for the Legislative Election 2010 in Ústí nad Labem Region.
