= Ludmila Müllerová =

Czech politician

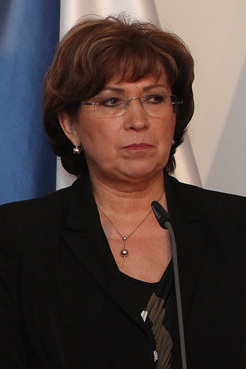

Minister of Labour and Social Affairs
- In office 16 November 2012 – 10 July 2013
- Prime Minister: Petr Nečas
- Preceded by: Jaromír Drábek
- Succeeded by: František Koníček

Senator from Ústí nad Orlicí District
- In office 13 November 2004 – 13 November 2010
- Preceded by: Bohumil Čada
- Succeeded by: Petr Šilar

Member of the Chamber of Deputies
- In office 1998–2002

Personal details
- Born: 27 September 1954 (age 71) Lanškroun, Czechoslovakia
- Party: TOP 09

Ludmila Müllerová (born 27 September 1954) is a Czech politician, who served as the Minister of Labour and Social Affairs from November 2012 to July 2013. She was named Minister of Labour and Social Affairs by President Václav Klaus in November 2012.
