= Petr Šilar =

Czech politician

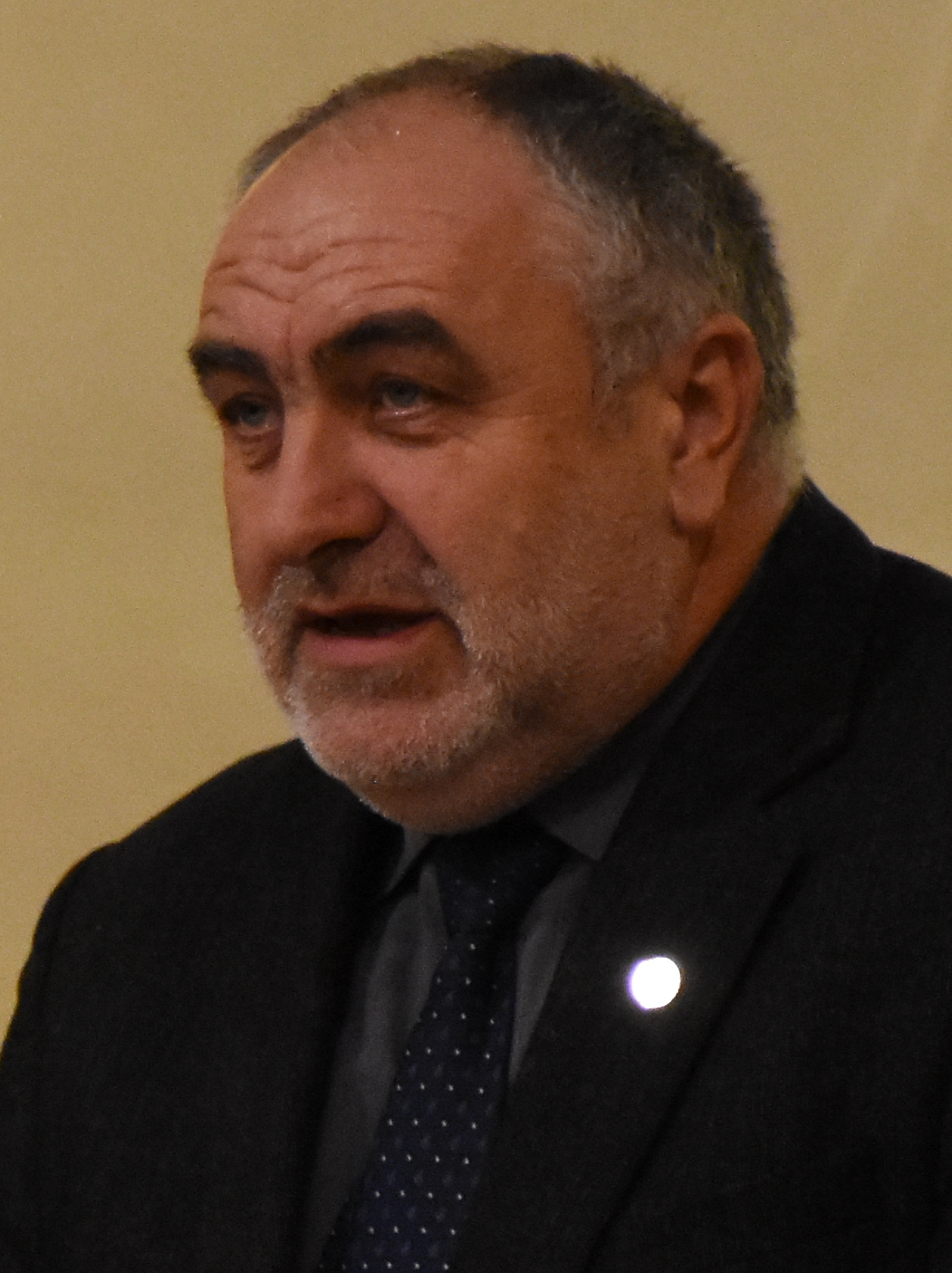

Senator from Ústí nad Orlicí
- In office 23 October 2010 – 15 October 2022
- Preceded by: Ludmila Müllerová
- Succeeded by: Petr Fiala

1st Vice-Chairman of KDU-ČSL
- In office 20 November 2010 – 7 October 2011
- Preceded by: Michaela Šojdrová
- Succeeded by: Marian Jurečka

Personal details
- Born: 16 May 1956 (age 70) Horní Čermná, Czechoslovakia (now Czech Republic)
- Party: OF; SD–LSNS; US–DEU (1999–2005); KDU–ČSL (2005–)
- Education: Czech University of Life Sciences Prague

Petr Šilar (born 16 May 1956) is a Czech politician who had been Senator from Ústí nad Orlicí from October 2010 to October 2022. From November 2012 to October 2011 he was a chairman of the Christian and Democratic Union – Czechoslovak People's Party Senate Club and member of presidency of the party.
