= Petr Šimerka =

Czech politician (born 1948)

Minister of Labour and Social Affairs
- In office 8 May 2009 – 13 July 2010
- Prime Minister: Jan Fischer
- Preceded by: Petr Nečas
- Succeeded by: Jaromír Drábek

Personal details
- Born: 22 November 1948 (age 77) Prague, Czechoslovakia
- Education: Charles University

Petr Šimerka (born 22 November 1948) is a Czech politician. He was the Minister of Labour and Social Affairs in the caretaker government of Jan Fischer.
