= Horní Čermná =

- Municipality
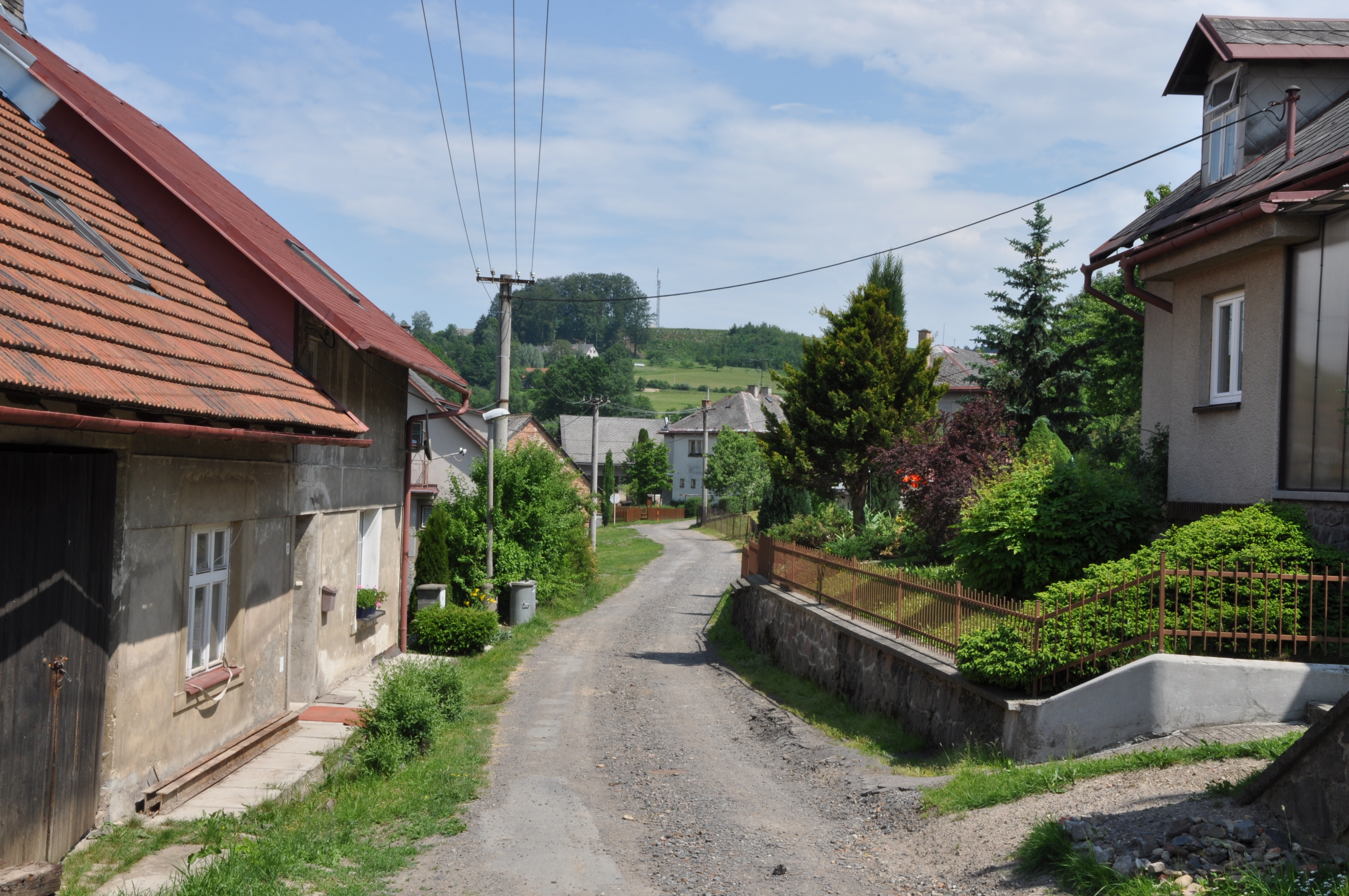
- Alley in Horní Čermná

- Flag Coat of arms

- Location in the Czech Republic
- Coordinates: 49°58′14″N 16°36′28″E
- Country: Czech Republic
- Region: Pardubice
- District: Ústí nad Orlicí
- First mentioned: 1304

Area
  - Total: 17.67 km^{2} (6.82 sq mi)
- Elevation: 421 m (1,381 ft)

Population (2026-01-01)
  - Total: 1,004
  - Density: 56.82/km^{2} (147.2/sq mi)
- Time zone: UTC+1 (CET)
  - Summer (DST): UTC+2 (CEST)
- Postal code: 561 56
- Website: hornicermna.cz

Horní Čermná (German: Ober Böhmisch Rothwasser) is a municipality and village in Ústí nad Orlicí District in the Pardubice Region of the Czech Republic. It has about 1,000 inhabitants.

== Administrative division ==
Horní Čermná consists of two municipal parts (in brackets population according to the 2021 census):

- Horní Čermná (812)
- Nepomuky (140)

== Demographics ==
Historical population
Year	Pop.	±%
1869	189	—
1880	168	−11.1%
1890	177	+5.4%
1900	135	−23.7%
1910	160	+18.5%
1921	140	−12.5%
1930	1,408	+905.7%
1950	1,000	−29.0%
1961	1,058	+5.8%
1970	989	−6.5%
1980	1,039	+5.1%
1991	1,061	+2.1%
2001	1,048	−1.2%
2011	1,004	−4.2%
2021	952	−5.2%
Source: Censuses

== Notable people ==
- Petr Šilar (born 1956), politician
