= Michaela Šojdrová =

Czech politician (born 1963)

Michaela Šojdrová MEP
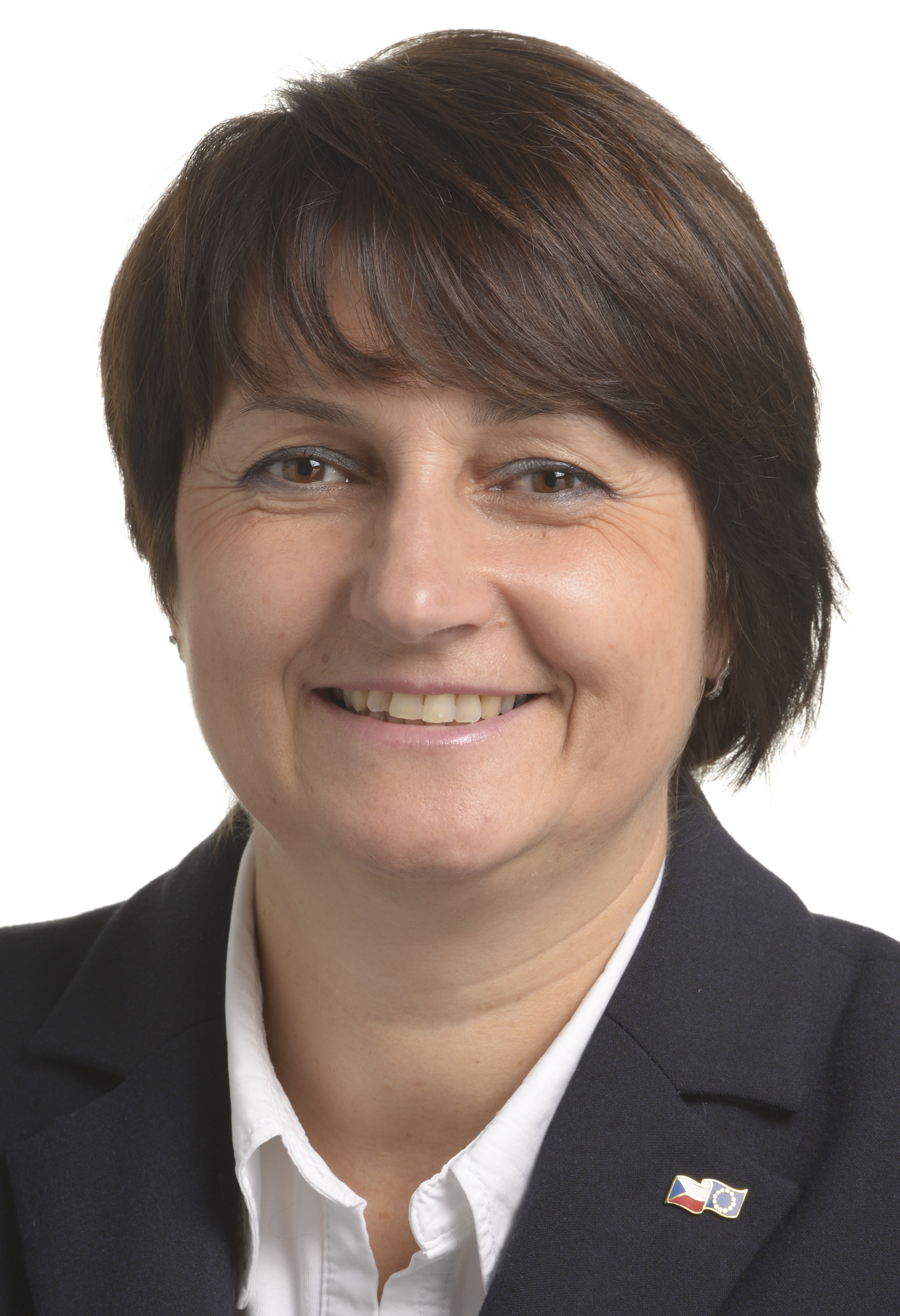

Member of the European Parliament
- In office 1 July 2014 – 15 July 2024
- Constituency: Czech Republic

1st vice-chairman of KDU-ČSL
- In office 30 May 2009 – 20 November 2010
- Preceded by: Roman Línek
- Succeeded by: Petr Šilar

Personal details
- Born: Michaela Nováková; 28 October 1963 (age 62) Gottwaldov, Czechoslovakia (now Zlín, Czech Republic)
- Party: Czech Republic; Christian and Democratic Union – Czechoslovak People's Party; European Union; European People's Party
- Spouse: Ludvík Šojdr
- Children: 2
- Education: Mendel University in Brno
- Website: www.sojdrova.cz

Michaela Šojdrová (born 28 October 1963) is a Czech politician who had served as Member of the European Parliament (MEP) from July 2014 to July 2024. She is a member of the Christian and Democratic Union – Czechoslovak People's Party, part of the European People's Party.

== Early life and education ==
She was born in Kroměříž. In 1983 she graduated first from the Gymnasium Kroměříž, then she studied the Faculty of Horticulture of the then University of Agriculture (now Mendel University in Brno), majoring in horticulture and landscape gardening. She graduated in 1987.

== Career ==
Prior to entering politics, Šojdrová worked at the head office of the Czech School Inspection. She was also employed in various other education administrative roles. From 1996 until 2010 she was a member of the Chamber of Deputies of the Parliament of the Czech Republic.

Šojdrová was for two terms a Member of the European Parliament from 2014 to 2024. She served on the Committee on Culture and Education, serving as coordinator of the European People's Party group. From 2014 until 2019, she was also a member of the Committee on Women's Rights and Gender Equality. Since her election, her work has focused on women's rights and gender equality.

Apart from her committee assignments, Šojdrová was part of the Parliament's delegations to the EU-Armenia Parliamentary Partnership Committee, the EU-Azerbaijan Parliamentary Cooperation Committee and the EU-Georgia Parliamentary Association Committee as well as to the Euronest Parliamentary Assembly. She is also part of the European Parliament Intergroup on Disability.

== Parliamentary service ==
- Vice-chair, Committee on Culture and Education (2014-2017, 2022-2024)
- Member, Committee on Culture and Education (2014, 2017–2019, 2019–2024)
- Member, Committee on Women's Rights and Gender Equality (2014–2019)
- Member, Delegation to the EU-Turkey Joint Parliamentary Committee (2014–2019)
