= Jana Nečasová =

Czech politician and civil servant

- Born: Jana Nagyová; 4 October 1968 (age 58); Chodov, Czechoslovakia
- Spouse: Petr Nečas (m. 2013; div. 2026)

Jana Nečasová (née Nagyová, born 21 July 1964) is a Czech former politician and civil servant. After running the Civic Democratic Party head office, she became chief of staff for Petr Nečas, who went on to become Prime Minister of the Czech Republic in 2010. In 2013, Nečasová was part of a political scandal, where she used the Military Secret Service to spy on Nečas' then wife to expedite divorce proceedings, marrying Nečas herself months later. The scandal would cause the collapse of Nečas' government, and lead Nečasová to be embroiled court cases for the following decade.

== Early career ==
Jana Nečasová was born on 21 July 1964 in Chodov, Czechoslovakia. There she worked as a pay clerk, before leaving her then husband and starting work for the Civic Democratic Party in Karlovy Vary in 1996, where she would become personal assistant to the local senator.

In 2005, Nečasová moved to Prague to run the head office of the Civic Democratic Party, working alongside the then deputy party chairman, Petr Nečas. In 2006, when Nečas became Minister of Labour and Social Affairs, he appointed her as his chief of staff, a role she continued when Nečas became Prime Minister of the Czech Republic in 2010.

Over the following three years, concerns were raised over the amount of influence Nečasová had over the Prime Minister, as she was paid large bonuses, and appeared to step over the bounds of her role. When Nečas split with his wife in early 2013, speculation about a relationship between the two appeared in the Czech press.

== 2013 Czech political corruption scandal ==
Nečasová was arrested on 13 June 2013, alongside Milan Kovanda – head of the military secret service – when the police raided the Government Office and other locations. Nečasová was accused of using the secret service to spy on Nečas' wife, Radka Nečasová, to find information which could be used in divorce proceedings.

Alongside other political corruption accusations, these revelations led to Nečas resigning his position on 16 June 2013, and the collapse of Nečas' remaining government, though Nečas would marry Nečasová that year, weeks after his divorce. Court proceedings would over the following years see Nečasová acquitted twice, then have the decision overturned by municipal courts. She was found guilty of spying in November 2017.

On 20 January 2023, president Miloš Zeman granted a presidential pardon to Nečasová in case of Military Intelligence. Later that June, she was sentenced to two years in prison, four years probation and a ten year ban on working for state administration, as well as a 1.3 million crown fine along with her husband.

On 24 February 2026, Nečasová and Petr Nečas were divorced.
