= Zdeněk Škromach =

Czech politician (born 1956)

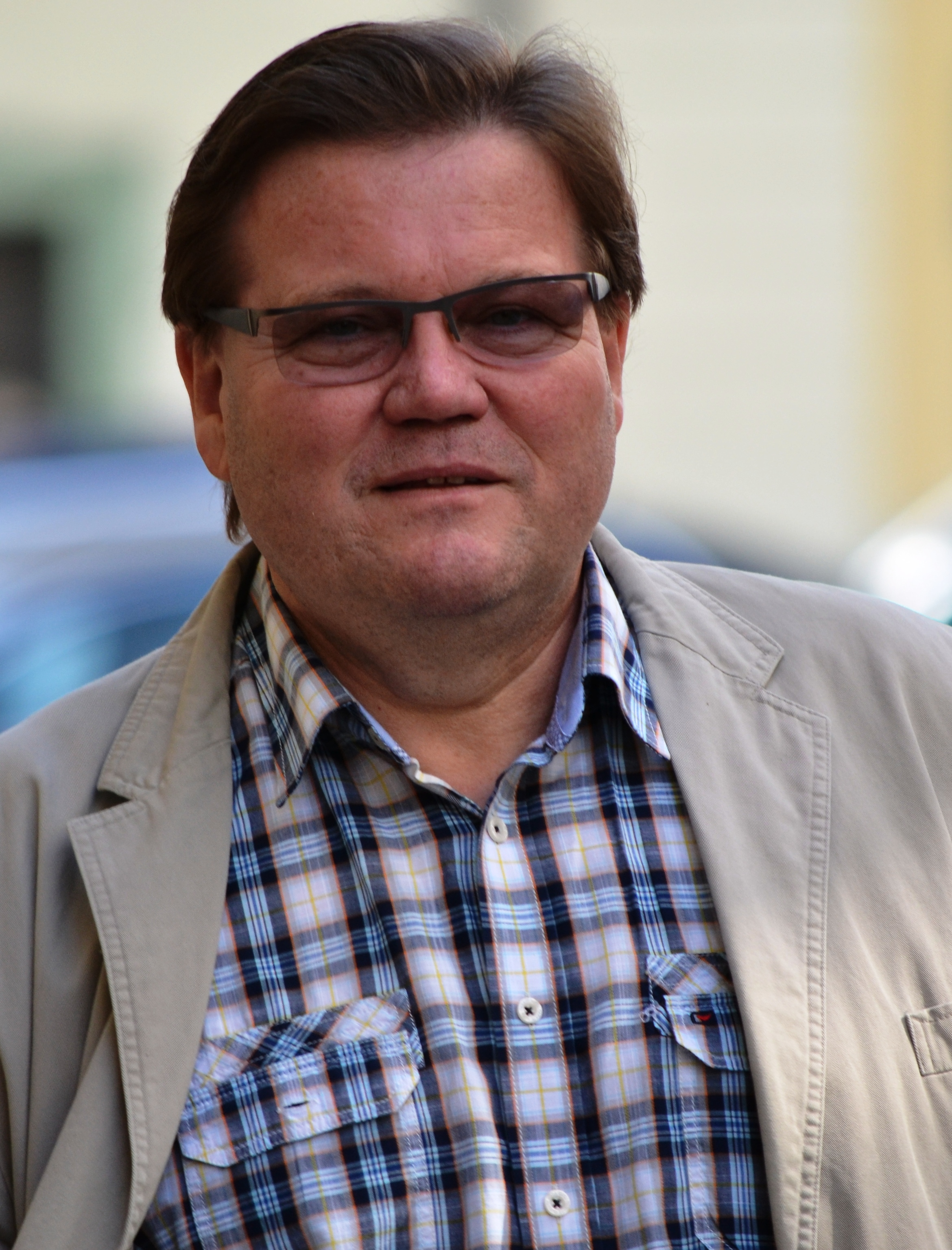
- Zdeněk Škromach in 2013

Minister of Labour and Social Affairs
- In office 15 July 2002 – 4 September 2006
- Prime Minister: Vladimír Špidla; Stanislav Gross; Jiří Paroubek
- Preceded by: Vladimír Špidla
- Succeeded by: Petr Nečas

Vice President of the Senate
- In office 24 November 2010 – 23 October 2016

Senator from Hodonín
- In office 23 October 2010 – 23 October 2016
- Preceded by: Alena Venhodová
- Succeeded by: Anna Hubáčková

Member of the Chamber of Deputies
- In office 20 June 1998 – 23 October 2010

Personal details
- Born: 31 December 1956 (age 69) Hodonín, Czechoslovakia (now Czech Republic)
- Party: ČSSD
- Spouse: Miroslava Škromachová
- Education: Brno University of Technology

Zdeněk Škromach (born 31 December 1956) is a Czech politician, who served as the vice-president of the Senate of the Parliament of the Czech Republic from 2010 to 2016.

== Family ==
He is married to Miroslava Škromachová and has two children.

== General references ==
- "Ing. Zdeněk Škromach". vlada.gov.cz. Government of the Czech Republic.
