= Straka Academy =

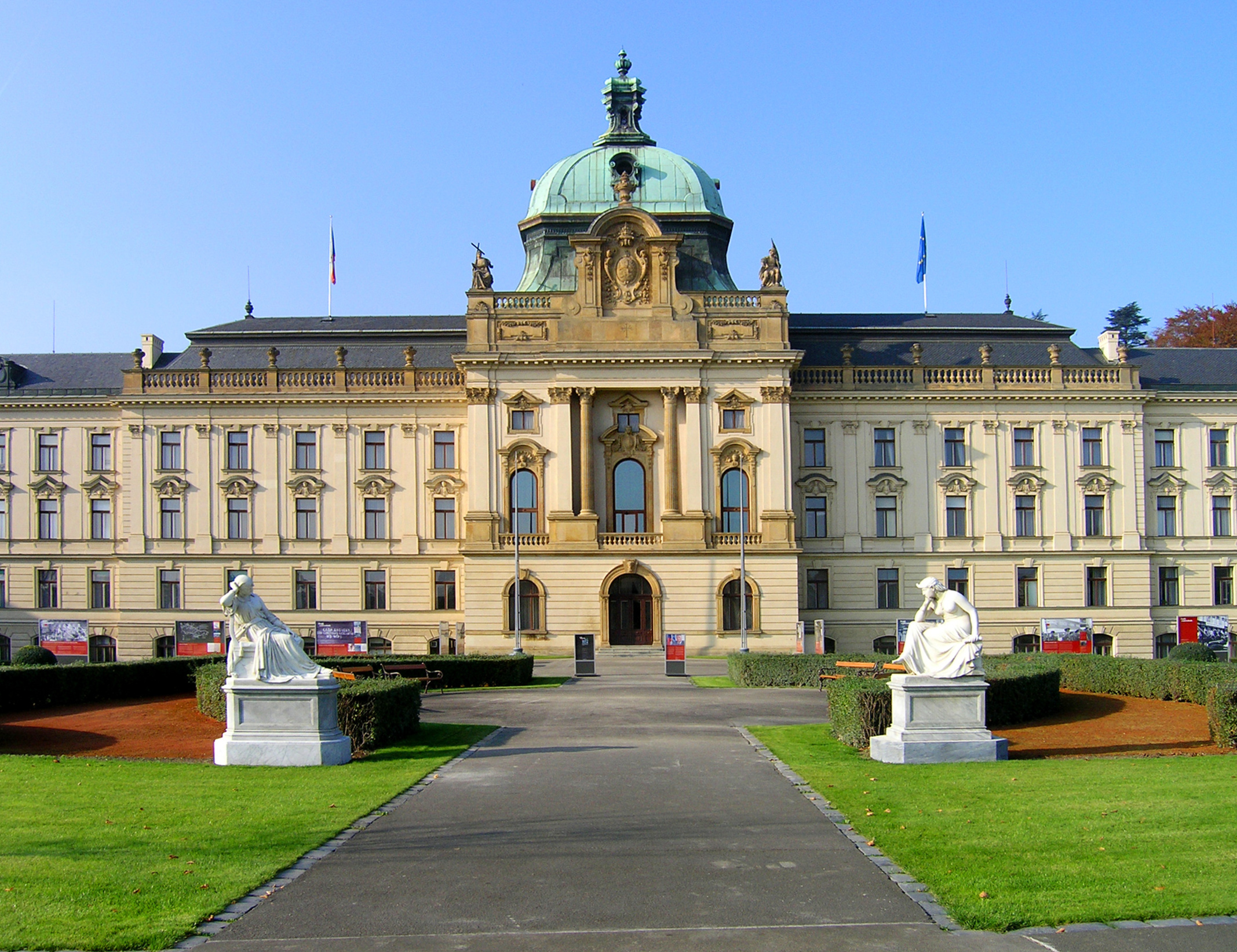
- Garden in front of Straka Academy

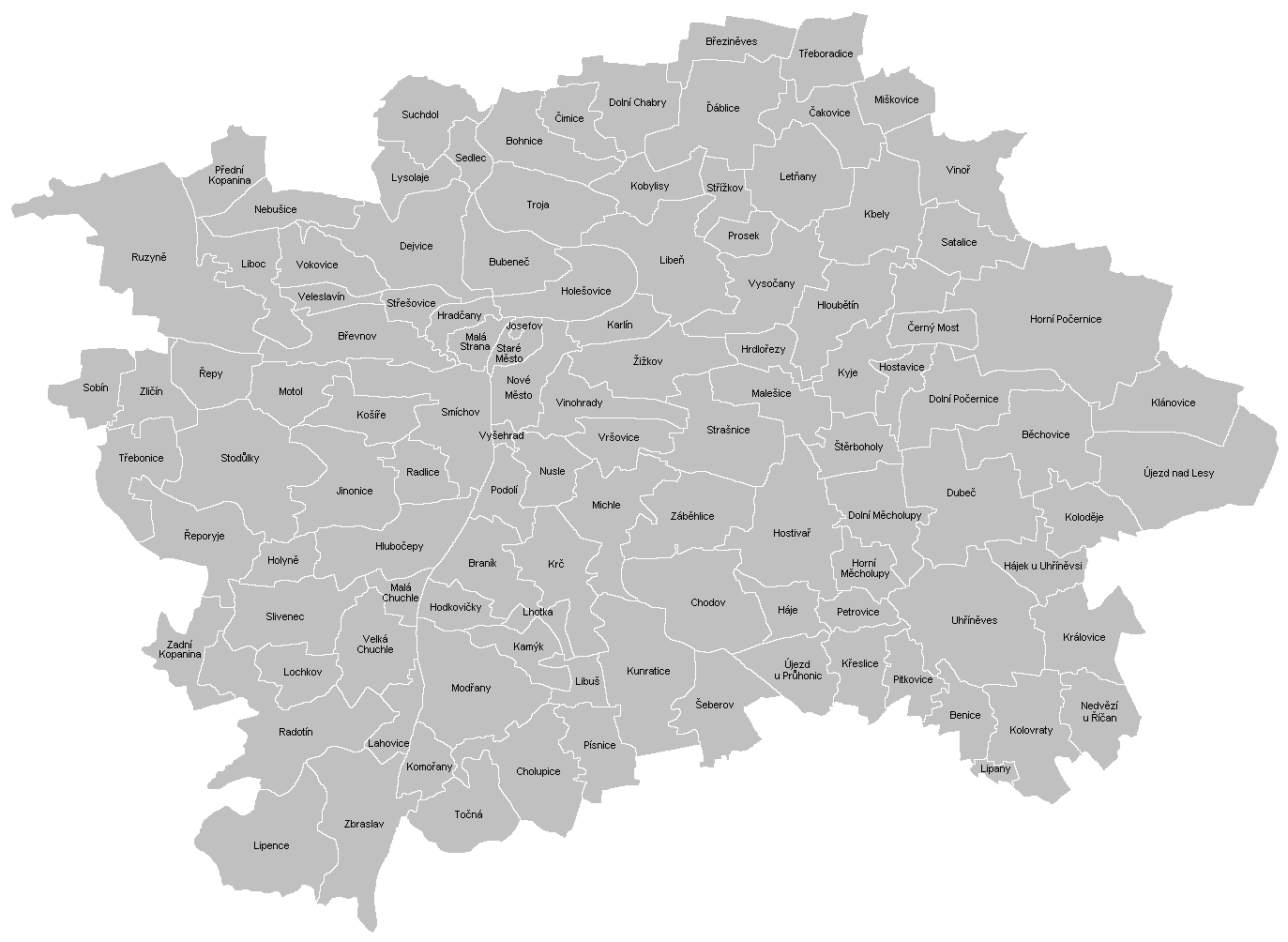
- Location within Greater Prague

General information
- Architectural style: Neo-baroque
- Location: Prague, Czech Republic
- Coordinates: 50°05′31″N 14°24′41″E
- Construction started: 1891; 135 years ago
- Completed: 1896; 130 years ago

Design and construction
- Architect: Václav Roštlapil

Website
- http://www.vlada.cz

The Straka Academy (in Czech: Strakova akademie) is the seat of the Government of the Czech Republic. It is a Neo-baroque building situated on the left bank of Vltava river, Malá Strana, Prague. It was designed by the architect Václav Roštlapil and built between 1891 and 1896. The building originally served as a dormitory for impoverished children of the Czech nobility.

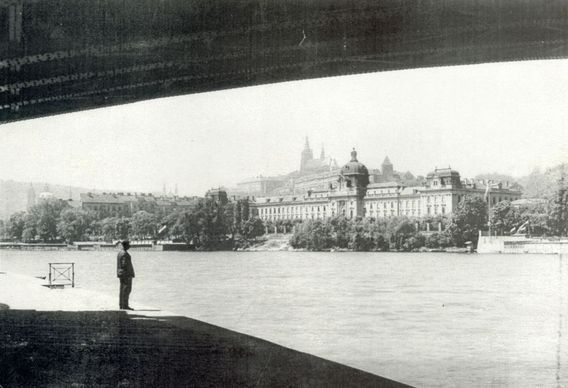
Straka Academy in 1914.
