= Stanislav Gross =

Czech politician (1969–2015)

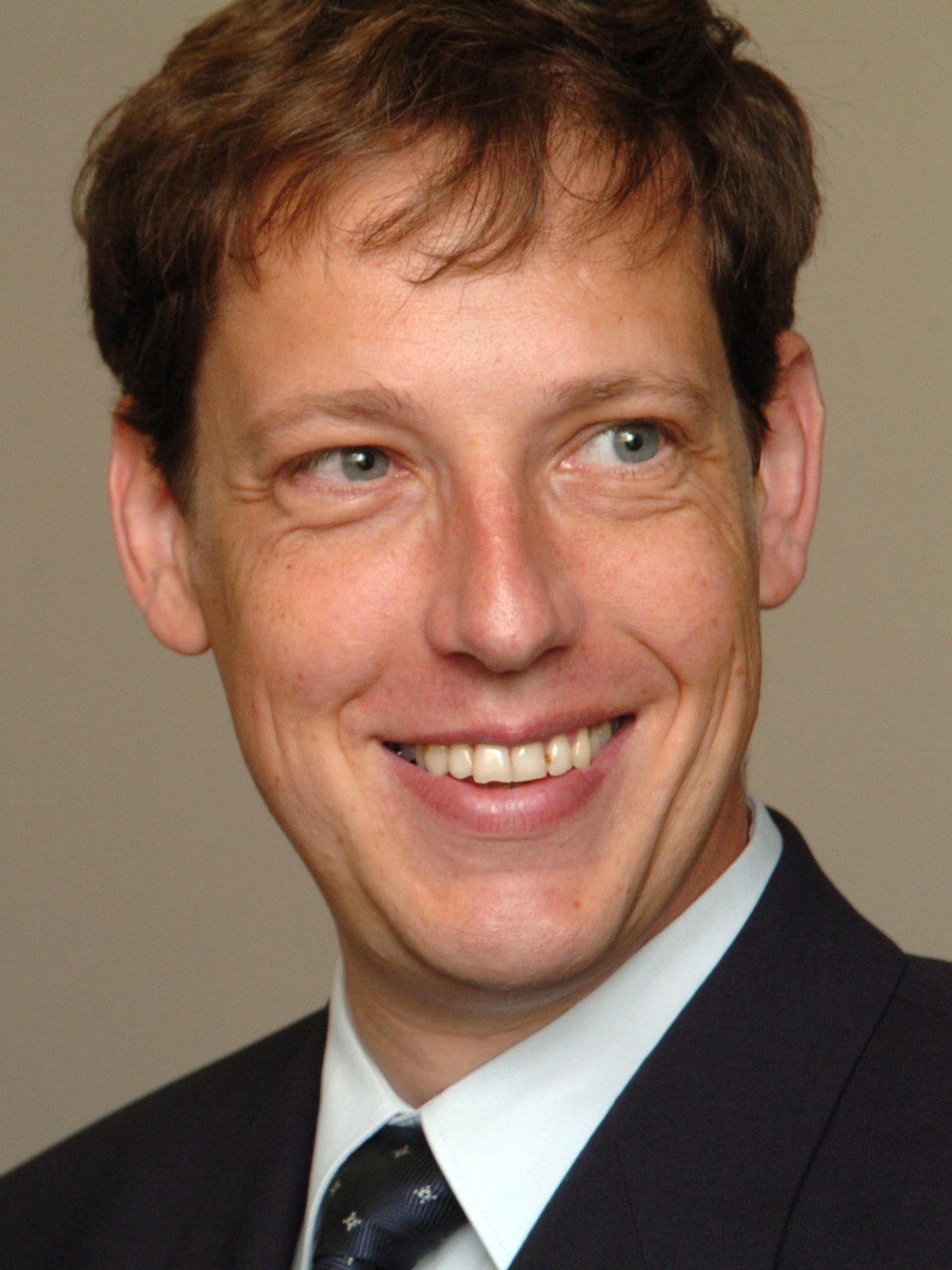
- Gross in 2004

Prime Minister of the Czech Republic
- In office 26 July 2004 – 25 April 2005
- President: Václav Klaus
- Preceded by: Vladimír Špidla
- Succeeded by: Jiří Paroubek

Leader of the Social Democratic Party
- In office 26 July 2004 – 26 April 2005
- Preceded by: Vladimír Špidla
- Succeeded by: Bohuslav Sobotka (acting)

Minister of the Interior
- In office 5 April 2000 – 4 August 2004
- Prime Minister: Miloš Zeman; Vladimír Špidla
- Preceded by: Václav Grulich
- Succeeded by: František Bublan

Member of the Chamber of Deputies
- In office 6 June 1992 – 21 September 2004

Personal details
- Born: 30 October 1969 Prague, Czechoslovakia
- Died: 16 April 2015 (aged 45) Prague, Czech Republic
- Party: ČSSD
- Spouse: Šárka Grossová
- Education: Charles University (M.L.); University of West Bohemia (JD)
- Profession: Lawyer

Stanislav Gross (Czech pronunciation: [ˈstaɲɪslav ˈɡros]; 30 October 1969 – 16 April 2015) was a Czech lawyer and politician who served as the prime minister of the Czech Republic and leader of the Czech Social Democratic Party from 2004 until 2005 when he resigned as a result of his financial irregularities. He previously served as minister of the Interior in cabinets of Miloš Zeman and Vladimír Špidla from 2000 to 2004. Gross was Member of the Chamber of Deputies (MP) from 1992 to 2004.

Gross died on 16 April 2015 at the age of 45 from amyotrophic lateral sclerosis (ALS).

== Early political career ==
Born in Prague, Gross briefly worked for Czechoslovak State Railways (ČSD) as an engine-driver trainee. After the Velvet Revolution in 1989, he became a member of the Social Democratic party and in 1992 member of the parliament. After studies in law from 1993 to 1999 he obtained an academic title, although under less than normal conditions. His thesis had a mere 33 pages.

== Minister of the Interior ==
On 5 April 2000 he was named interior minister in the government of Miloš Zeman. After elections in 2002, Gross continued as interior minister and became deputy prime minister in the government of Vladimír Špidla.

During his service, several scandals in the police had leaked out: corruption among the highest officials, irregularities in business tenders and failure to solve serial murders. Gross claimed that this was due to a better ability to discover such behaviour within the police force. Gross was also criticized for installing his friends and allies as executives in state-owned companies and for misuse of secret services for political aims.

In spite of these problems, Gross was able to maintain higher popularity than other politicians (his peak came in at over 70%). His youthful, photogenic appearance, skills in dealing with media and unwillingness to get involved in controversial decisions or discussions helped.

== Prime minister ==
In the 2004 European election, ČSSD lost badly and the popularity of the party was low; this led to the resignation of Špidla on 26 July. Gross was appointed prime minister on 4 August 2004 and his government was approved on 24 August.

Gross was seen by his party as the last way to regain popularity and better handle future elections. This was proved wrong; in elections for regional assemblies and Senate elections, the Social Democrats failed again.

Gross claimed he would modernise the party on lines similar to those followed by Tony Blair, but his short time in office and constant involvement with scandals did not give him any time to implement changes. His popularity started to decline, and his involvement in further allegations of nepotism, police corruption, suspicious dealings in state privatisations accelerated the decline.

== Financial irregularities ==
In early 2005, Gross faced a scandal related to unclear origins of the loan to buy his flat. It was found that his wife was a business associate of a brothel owner who was later sentenced for insurance fraud to five years in prison. Criticism from the media and record public dissatisfaction grew into a government crisis. For three months, Gross tried to keep himself in power until he was forced to resign on 25 April 2005. His popularity sank to a record low, and trust in politicians among Czech people was shattered.

In September 2005 Gross stepped down from his remaining position of party leader. The reason was growing suspicion about corruption involving Gross during the sale of the chemical conglomerate Unipetrol to the Polish state-owned entreprise PKN Orlen.

Gross denied all accusations as an absurd conspiracy against him.

== Later life and death ==
After leaving the world of top level politics Gross started to work for the Law Office of Eduard Bruna. Between April 2006 and January 2007 he served as the chairman of Security Commission of the Social Democrats (bezpečnostní komise). The media had occasionally speculated about his influence on decisions made within the Czech police.

In September 2007, the economics weekly Euro published information that Gross and his wife bought up to a 31% stake in the energy company Moravia Energo. The value of the stake was estimated to be worth about 300 million CZK. The journal calculated that the banks would provide at most two-thirds of the sum and the rest was thus paid by Gross. When this information was published Gross refused to provide details to the press on grounds of privacy. By June 2008 Gross successfully sold his 31% stake for 150 million CZK, his original purchase price was 21 million CZK. The whole deal was very curious and was investigated, but it was quickly found to be a legitimate business deal according to the Czech Police.

On 18 March 2008 he failed the bar exam, but later passed it and opened a private law practice. Gross was student of the Charles University in Prague and later was awarded his law degree by the University of West Bohemia at Plzeň. In 2009 this university has been the centre of investigations into allegations of law degrees being awarded after only a few months study. Gross was mentioned during the investigation.

In early 2008 together with his wife Šárka Grossová, they purchased a $735,000 (or 11 million CZK) Hidden Bay luxury condo in Miami, Florida (review of public online county records show that the property was purchased in his wife's name only). Gross and his wife also purchased a small 10 million CZK house in need of major renovations about 1 km from their apartment in Barrandov, Prague, Czech Republic (controversy surrounding the purchase of that apartment was one of the key factors in his stepping down from his post as prime minister and leaving politics).

Gross died on 16 April 2015 at the age of 45 from amyotrophic lateral sclerosis.

== In popular culture ==
Gross was an inspiration for the character of corrupt prime minister Klein in the film Gangster Ka.

Political offices
Preceded by Václav Grulich	Minister of the Interior; 2000–2004	Succeeded by František Bublan
Preceded by Vladimír Špidla	Prime Minister of the Czech Republic; 2004–2005	Succeeded by Jiří Paroubek
