= Government of the Czech Republic =

Executive branch of the Czech political system

- Vláda České republiky
- Central government

Overview
- Established: 1 January 1993
- State: Czech Republic
- Leader: Prime Minister
- Appointed by: President
- Responsible to: Chamber of Deputies
- Headquarters: Straka Academy, Prague
- Website: https://vlada.gov.cz/en/

The Government of the Czech Republic (Czech: Vláda České republiky) exercises executive power in the Czech Republic. The members of the government are the Prime Minister of the Czech Republic (Chairman of the Government), the deputy prime minister and other ministers. It has its legal basis in the Constitution of the Czech Republic.

== Overview ==
The government is led by the Prime Minister, who selects all the remaining ministers at hand. The Government of the Czech Republic is responsible to the Chamber of Deputies from the Czech Republic.

The Prime Minister is appointed by the President of the Czech Republic. The Prime Minister as of December 2025 is Andrej Babiš.

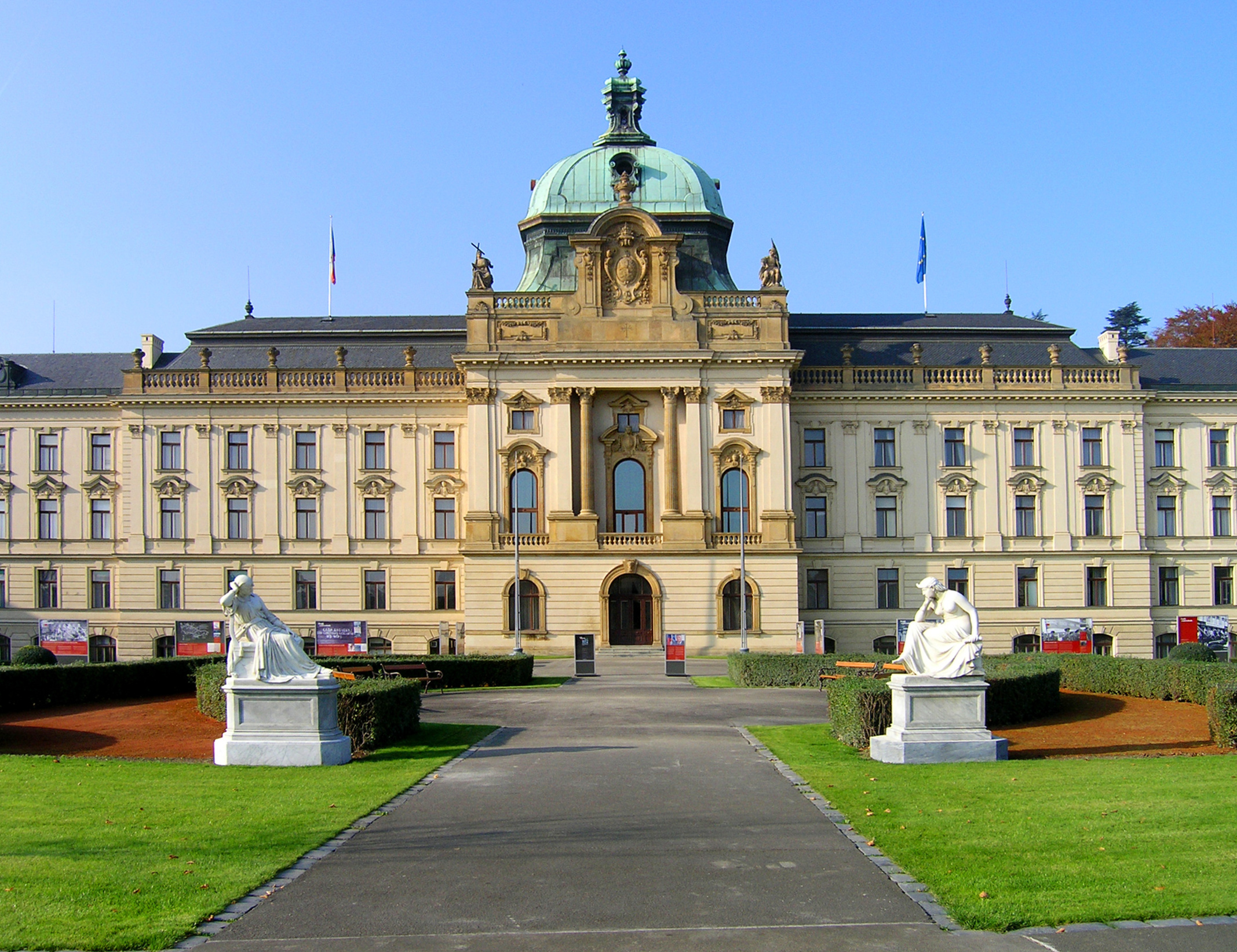
Straka Academy, Seat of the Government of the Czech Republic.

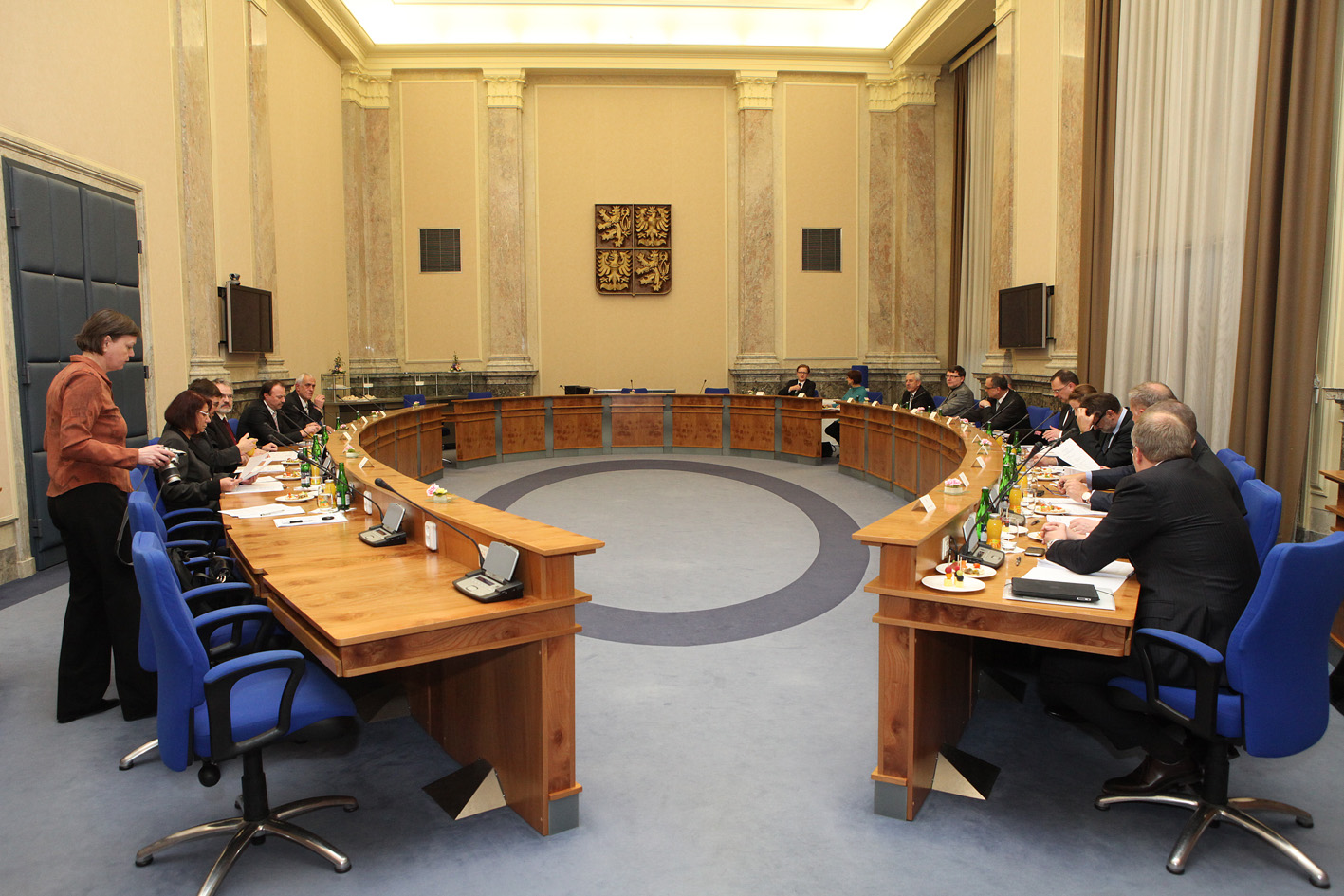
Cabinet room of the Government in Straka Academy.

== Current Cabinet ==
The current government, sworn in on 15 December 2025, is the 17th since the dissolution of Czechoslovakia in 1993. It has 15 members and a prime minister. The cabinet consists of the following members:

Cabinet of the Czech Republic
| Office | Name | Political party |
| Prime Minister | Andrej Babiš | ANO 2011 |
| Minister of Foreign Affairs | Petr Macinka | AUTO |
| Minister of the Interior | Lubomír Metnar | ANO 2011 |
| Finance Minister | Alena Schillerová | ANO 2011 |
| Minister of Defense | Jaromír Zůna | Independent |
| Minister of Justice | Jeroným Tejc | Independent |
| Minister of Industry and Trade | Karel Havlíček | ANO 2011 |
| Minister for Regional Development | Zuzana Mrázová | ANO 2011 |
| Ministry of Health | Adam Vojtěch | Independent |
| Minister of Labour and Social Affairs | Aleš Juchelka | ANO 2011 |
| Minister of Education, Youth and Sports | Robert Plaga | Independent |
| Minister of Transport | Ivan Bednárik | Independent |
| Minister of the Environment | Igor Červený | AUTO |
| Minister of Culture | Oto Klempíř | AUTO |
| Minister of Agriculture | Martin Šebestyán | Independent |
| Minister for Sport, Prevention and Health | Boris Šťastný | AUTO |

== Advisory and Working Bodies of the Government ==
=== Councils ===
- National Security Council
- Government Legislative Council
- Inter-ministerial Commission for Roma Community Affairs
- Government Council for Human Rights
- Government Council for National Minorities
- Research and Development Council
- Government Council for Drug Policy Coordination
- Government Dislocation Commission
- Government Board for People with Disabilities
- Government Commissioner for Human Rights
- The Government Council for Equal Opportunities for Women and Men
- Committee for EU
- Independent Panel on the Assessment of the Czech Republic's Long-Term Energy Requirements

=== Bodies not provided for by the Government Office ===
- Government Council for Sustainable Development
- The Czech Government Council for Health Care and Environment
- The Government Council for Safety, Hygiene and Health at Work
- Government Council for Seniors and Population Ageing
- Czech Republic Government Council for Road Safety
- National Co-ordination Group for Digital Broadcasting in the CR
- The Czech Commission for UNESCO
- The Central Flood Commission
- The Czech Republics' Council for Quality (in Czech only)
- Government Council for the Revitalization of Areas Affected by Flooding
- Commission on the Management of Occurrences of Infectious Diseases in the Czech Republic
- Government Council for the Information Society
- Commission for the Reconciliation of Relations between the State and Churches and Religious Societies
- Czech Republic Government Council - Investment Council
