= Petr Nečas =

Czech politician

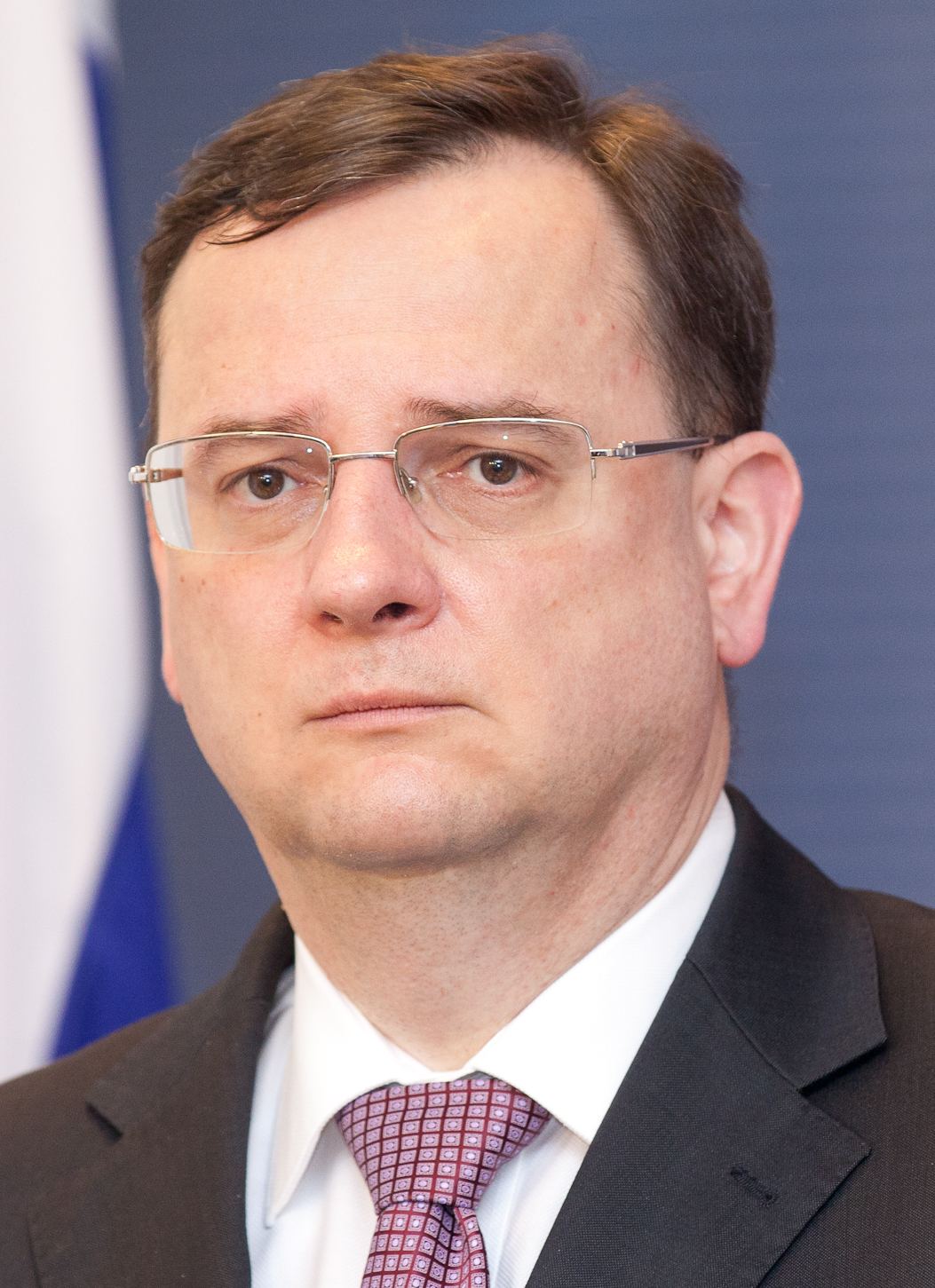
- Nečas in 2013

Prime Minister of the Czech Republic
- In office 28 June 2010 – 25 June 2013
- President: Václav Klaus; Miloš Zeman
- Preceded by: Jan Fischer
- Succeeded by: Jiří Rusnok

Leader of the Civic Democratic Party
- In office 20 April 2010 – 17 June 2013
- Preceded by: Mirek Topolánek
- Succeeded by: Petr Fiala

Minister of Defence Acting
- In office 21 December 2012 – 19 March 2013
- Prime Minister: Himself
- Preceded by: Karolína Peake
- Succeeded by: Vlastimil Picek

Minister of Labour and Social Affairs
- In office 4 September 2006 – 8 May 2009
- Prime Minister: Mirek Topolánek
- Preceded by: Zdeněk Škromach
- Succeeded by: Petr Šimerka

Member of the Chamber of Deputies
- In office 1 January 1993 – 28 August 2013

Personal details
- Born: 19 November 1964 (age 61) Uherské Hradiště, Czechoslovakia
- Party: Civic Democratic Party
- Spouse(s): Radka Nečasová (m. 1986; div. 2013) Jana Nečasová (m. 2013; div. 2026)
- Children: 4
- Education: Jan Evangelista Purkyně University (now Masaryk University)

Petr Nečas (Czech pronunciation: [ˈpɛtr̩ ˈnɛtʃas]; born 19 November 1964) is a Czech former politician who served as the prime minister of the Czech Republic and leader of the Civic Democratic Party from 2010 to 2013, and as Member of the Chamber of Deputies (MP) from 1993 to 2013.

Born in Uherské Hradiště, Nečas earned a doctor of natural sciences degree in physics at Masaryk University in Brno. In 1991, he was one of the co-founders of the Civic Democratic Party (ODS). Becoming an MP in 1993, he served as a member of the Foreign Committee of the Chamber of Deputies and three years later he became Chairman of the Committee on Security. In 2006, Nečas was appointed as Minister of Labour and Social Affairs under the leadership of Prime Minister Mirek Topolánek. In the Chamber of Deputies, he was given the nickname Fidel by the communist MPs due to his long filibustering speeches. The 2010 legislative election led to Nečas becoming prime minister as the head of a coalition government with TOP 09 and Public Affairs (VV) (later replaced by Liberal Democrats). His premiership was marked by the 2008 financial crisis and the Great Recession; these involved a large deficit in government finances that his government sought to reduce through austerity measures. The cabinet led by Nečas pushed through laws on the restitution of the properties of the Christian churches, pensionary reform and reform of the colleges; all of these were deeply unpopular and were much criticized.

Nečas resigned on 17 June 2013 due to police investigation in which his chief of staff Jana Nagyová (now Jana Nečasová), who was also his wife, was arrested. His resignation opened the way to the 2013 snap election, where his party ODS was marginalized to only 16 seats, the lowest in its history, and sent into opposition.

He has been praised for the savings made to rein in the Czech Republic's national debt. His critics often accuse him of corruption and criticise his inability to solve healthcare issues. In May 2023, Nečas was convicted of perjury and issued a fine, becoming the first Czech prime minister in history to be found guilty of a criminal offense.

== Early life and education ==
Nečas was born in Uherské Hradiště, Czech Republic, on 19 November 1964. He attended gymnasium in Uherské Hradiště from 1979 to 1983. He graduated from the Faculty of Science at the University of J.E. Purkyně in Brno in 1988. Nečas met his future wife, Radka Nečasová, at school when he was 18. In 2013, he filed for divorce and not long after married his former chief of staff, Jana Nagyová. On 24 February 2026, Nečas and Jana Nečasová and were divorced.

== Political career ==
=== Early career ===
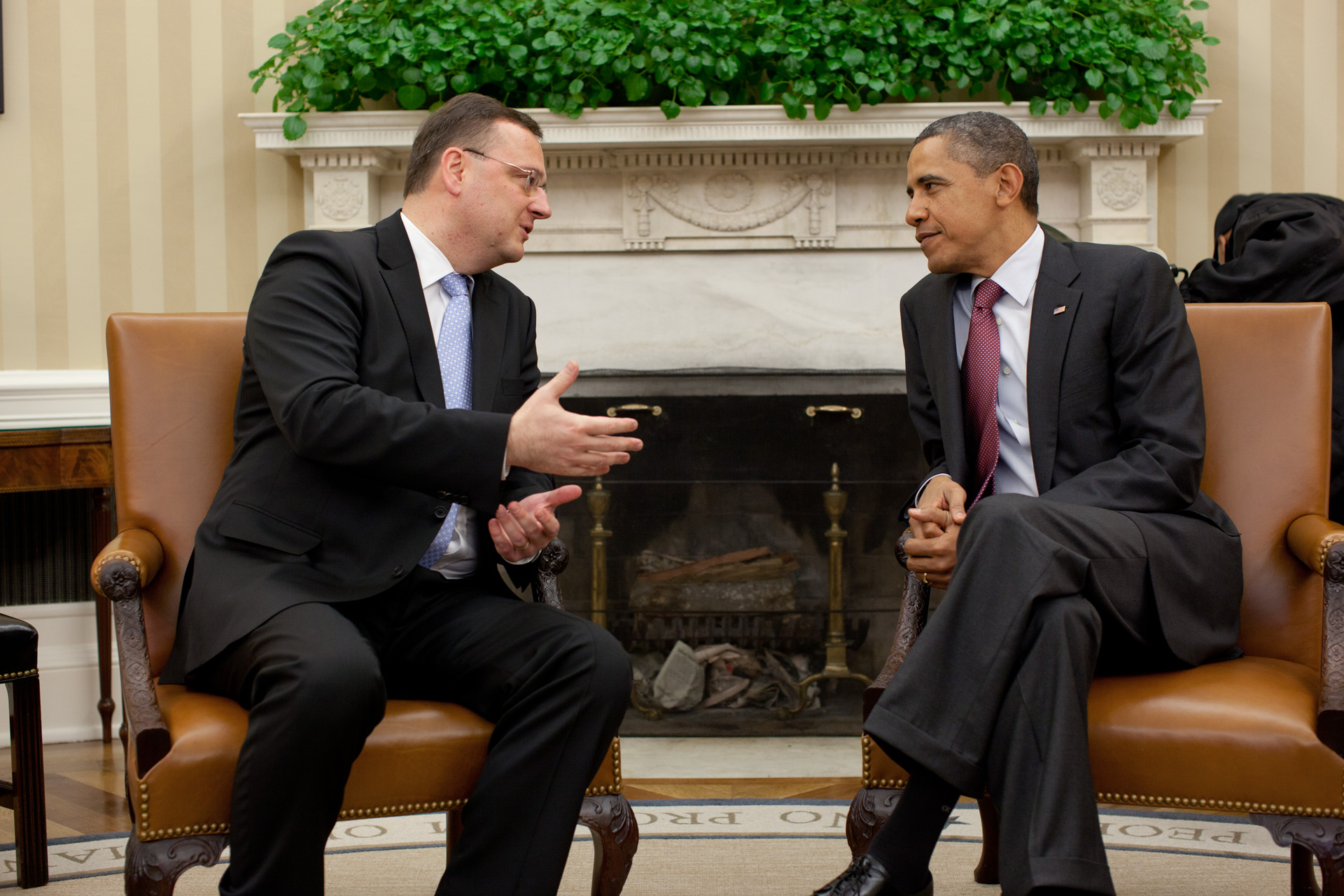
Nečas meeting with U.S. President Barack Obama in Washington, D.C., on 27 October 2011

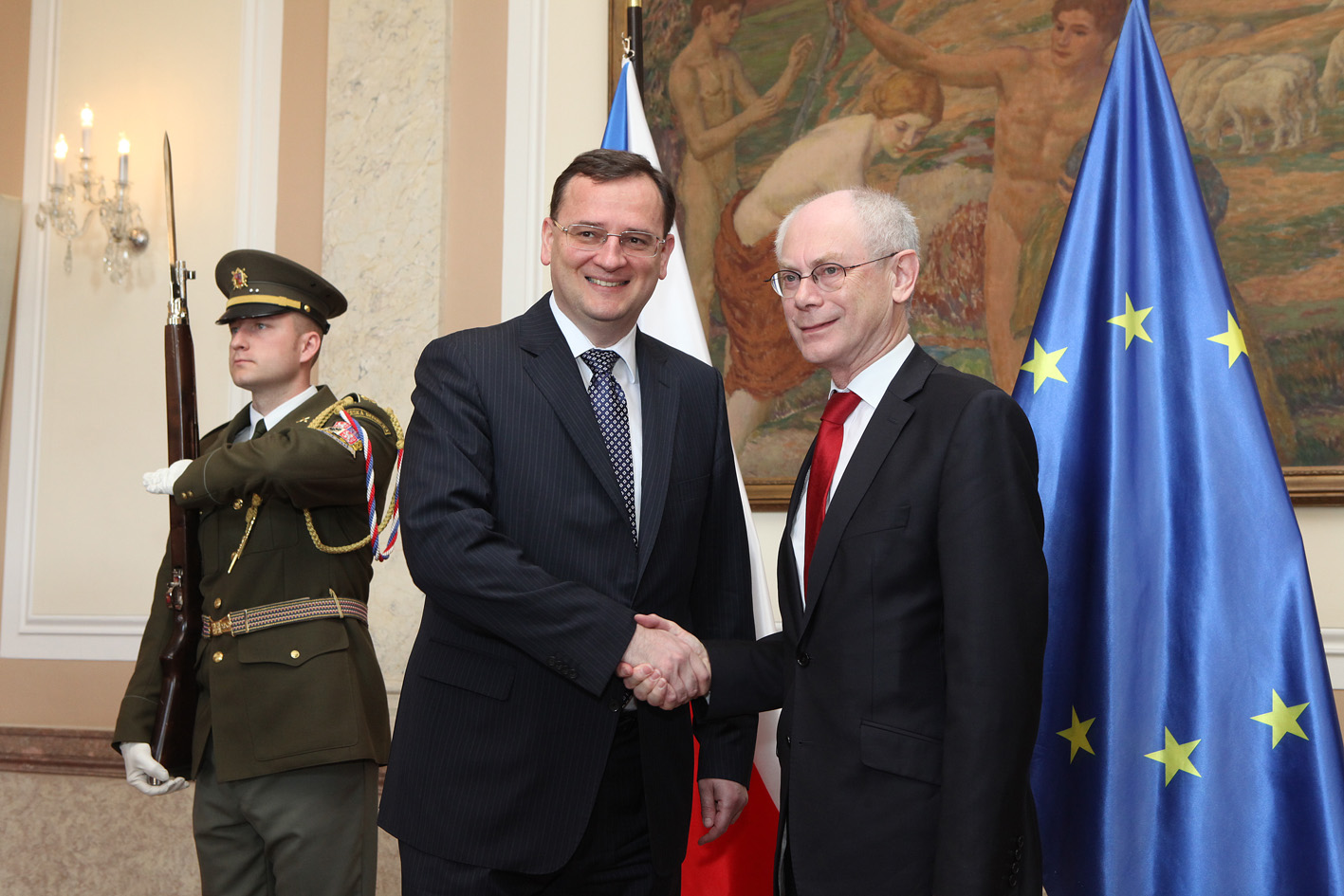
Nečas meeting with President of the European Council Herman Van Rompuy in Prague, on 25 April 2013

Nečas studied plasma physics. Before he was elected to the Czech Parliament, he worked as a research and development engineer in the semiconductor industry, dealing with plasma processes. From 1988 to 1992, he worked as developer for Tesla Rožnov. He became a member of the Civic Democratic Party (ODS) in 1991 and was named deputy defence minister in 1995. One year later, he was elected a member of the Chamber of Deputies. From 4 September 2006 to 8 May 2009, Nečas was Deputy Prime Minister and Minister of Labour and Social Affairs.

In March 2010, he replaced Mirek Topolánek as leader of the party. The Civic Democratic Party came second in the 2010 Czech legislative election and shortly after Nečas announced his intention to stand for the post of party chairman.

=== Prime Minister of the Czech Republic ===
In 2011, Nečas supported European organizations signing an agreement on the establishment of the Platform of European Memory and Conscience for studies on the totalitarian past. On this occasion, Nečas highlighted that all four countries of the Visegrád Group have gone through two totalitarian regimes in their modern history. "This must not be forgotten, because it was a period of fighting for freedom", he said, adding: "Our nations deserve the truth about their past and I believe that the establishment of this Platform will help to find the truth about this history".

In 2012, Nečas urged all Czechs to avoid drinking "any alcohol whose origin is uncertain" due to a fatal methanol poisoning affair in the Czech Republic which caused more than 40 casualties, including several cases of people being blinded.

In 2013, Nečas supported Israel with the Czech Republic's vote at the United Nations. Due to an historical affinity, Nečas claimed: "We've got a special feeling for Israel's situation—that of a small nation surrounded by enemies."

In June 2013, the Police Unit for Combating Organized Crime and the Chief Public Prosecutor's Office in Olomouc organized a raid against organized crime. It involved several high-ranking state officials and politicians, including Jana Nagyová, then-chief of staff of Prime Minister Nečas. Initially Nečas refused to resign but he finally did so on 17 June. In February 2014, the police charged him with bribery.

=== Post-premiership ===
Upon leaving politics in 2013, Nečas started to work for SPGroup and also became a tutor at CEVRO Institute. In June 2017, he became an adviser to Pavel Sehnal, leader of the newly established Civic Democratic Alliance. Sehnal stated that the party would stand Nečas in elections if the latter did not have to face charges from the time of his premiership.

Petr Nečas is a Member of the Prague Society for International Cooperation and has been a long-standing supporter since its founding in 1997.

== See also ==
- Cabinet of Petr Nečas

Party political offices
Preceded by Mirek Topolánek	Leader of the Civic Democratic Party; 2010–2013	Succeeded by Martin Kuba
Political offices
Preceded by Zdeněk Škromach	Minister of Labour and Social Affairs; 2006–2009	Succeeded by Petr Šimerka
Preceded by Jan Fischer	Prime Minister of the Czech Republic; 2010–2013	Succeeded by Jiří Rusnok
