= Prime Minister of the Czech Republic =

Head of government

- Předseda vlády České republiky (Czech)
- Government Logo

- Incumbent; Andrej Babiš since 9 December 2025
- Government of the Czech Republic
- Style: Mr Prime Minister (informal); His Excellency (diplomatic)
- Member of: Cabinet; European Council
- Reports to: Chamber of Deputies
- Residence: Kramář's Villa
- Seat: Straka Academy
- Nominator: President of the Chamber of Deputies (Note: If the appointed government fails to gain the confidence of the Chamber of Deputies after two attempts, the President appoints the Prime Minister on the proposal of the President of the Chamber of Deputies.)
- Appointer: President
- Term length: Four years, renewable indefinitely
- Formation: 1 January 1993; 33 years ago
- First holder: Václav Klaus
- Salary: 274,800 Kč monthly
- Website: vlada.cz

The prime minister of the Czech Republic (Czech: Předseda vlády České republiky) (Note: The formal translation is Chair of the Government. In Czech, the most common term is premiér (Premier), another one is ministerský předseda (Minister-President).) is the head of the government of the Czech Republic and the de facto leader and most powerful member of the executive branch.

The Constitution provides that certain presidential actions require the prime minister's countersignature, including in appointing judges and ambassadors, commanding the military, ratifying treaties and issuing amnesties.

The current prime minister, Andrej Babiš, leader of ANO, was sworn-in by President Petr Pavel on 9 December 2025, following the 2025 election and serves as the 14th person in the office.

== Role ==
The prime minister is also authorised to release a member of the government or from confidence, relating to classified information. By virtue of their position, they represent the Czech Republic in the European Council and are entitled to a diplomatic passport.

The prime minister also serves as direct superior of the General Inspection of Security Forces, when they appoint and dismiss its director, who is responsible to them of the performance of their function.

According to Article 63 of the Constitution, the prime minister bears responsibility for signing the decisions together with the entire government of Czech Republic. They can authorise another member of the government to countersign and refuse to co-sign.

== Powers ==
One important power of the prime minister is the possibility of replacing the entire government by their decision and declare a state of emergency. The government must approve or cancel its decision within 24 hours of its announcement. In case a decision-making crisis would pass to the government, the prime minister would decide with Ministry of Defense.

== Residence ==
The building was built from 1911 to 1914. It was designed by the Viennese architect Friedrich Ohmann.

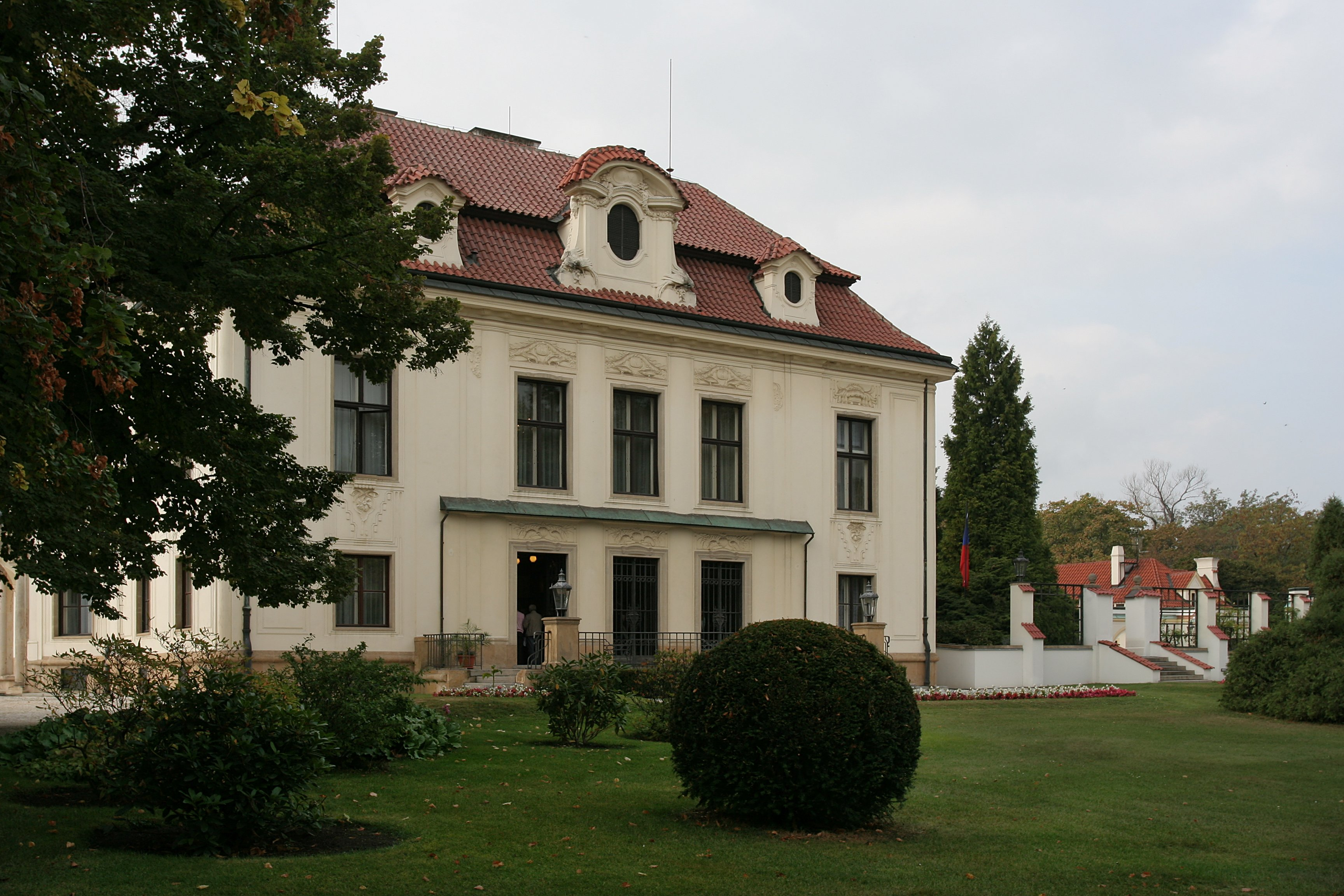
Kramář's Villa seen from the garden

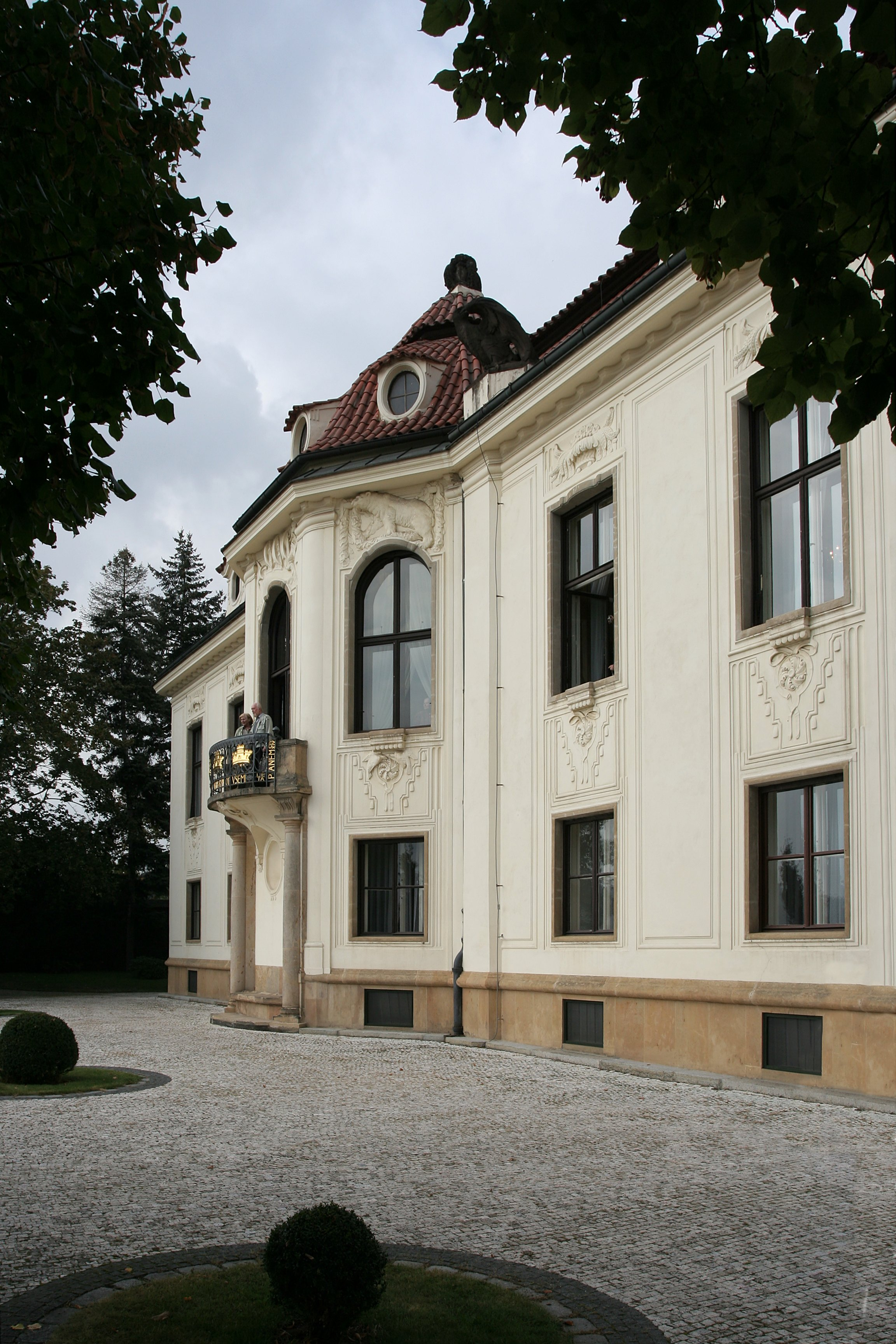
View from the garden

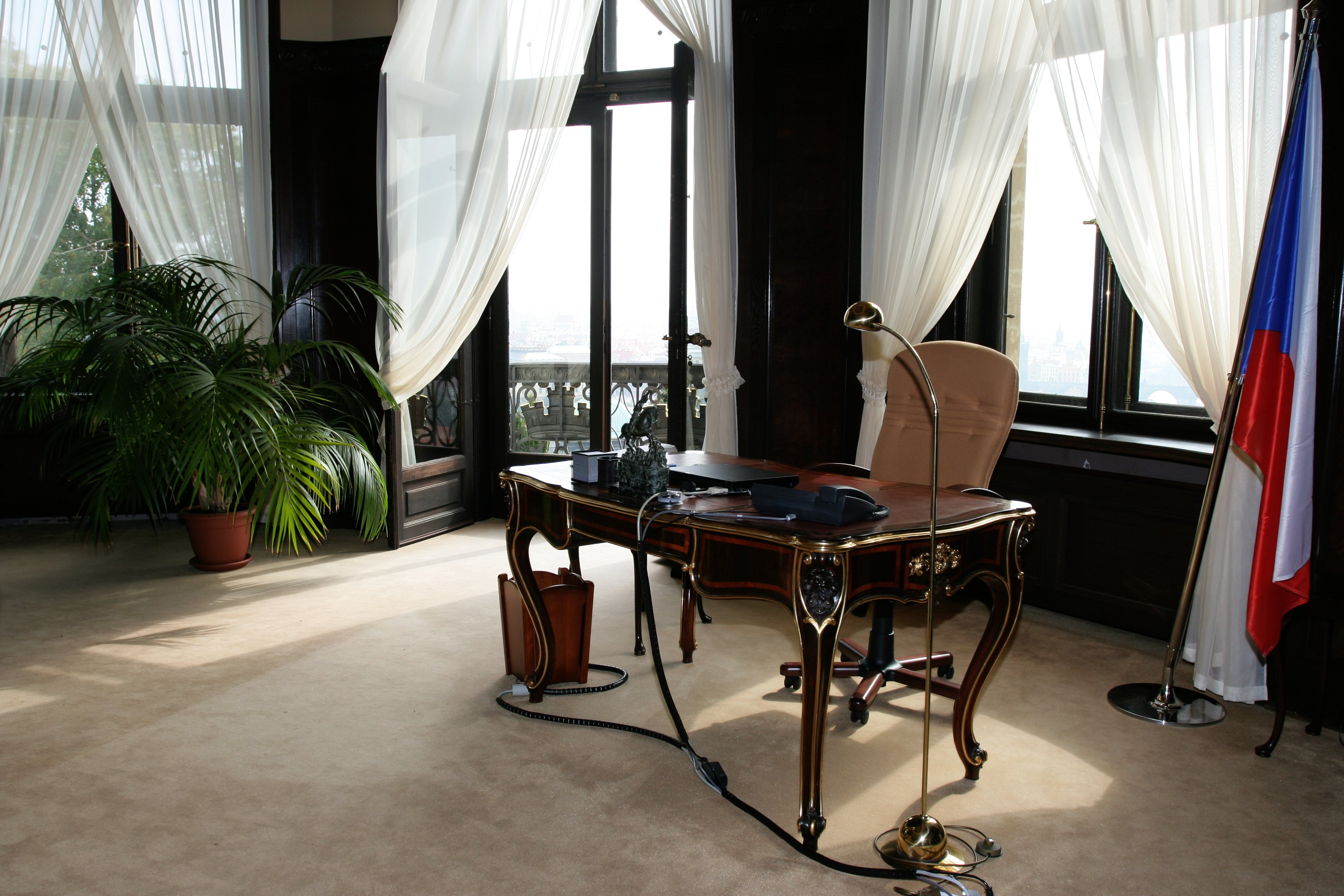
Home office of the prime minister
