= Senate district 12 – Strakonice =

Electoral district in the Czech Republic

Coordinates: 49°11′42″N 13°55′30″E

12 – Strakonice
- inline Senate district of the Czech Republic

- The Strakonice district on a map
- Senator: Tomáš Fiala; Our Czechia
- Region: South Bohemian
- District: Strakonice; Písek; Prachatice
- Electorate: 110074
- Area: 2,116.22 km²
- Last election: 2026
- Next election: 2032

Senate district 12 – Strakonice is an electoral district of the Senate of the Czech Republic, containing whole of the Strakonice District as well as parts of Písek and Prachatice Districts. Since 2020, Tomáš Fiala, a Our Czechia nominee, is the Senator for the district.

== Senators ==
Year	Senator	Party
1996	Pavel Rychetský	ČSSD
2002	Pavel Rychetský	ČSSD
2003	Josef Kalbáč	KDU-ČSL
2008	Miroslav Krejča	ČSSD
2014	Karel Kratochvíle	ČSSD
2020	Tomáš Fiala	ODS
2026	Tomáš Fiala	Our Czechia

== Election results ==
=== 1996 ===
1996 Czech Senate election in Strakonice
Candidate	Party	1st round		2nd round	
Candidate	Party	Votes	%	Votes	%
Pavel Rychetský	ČSSD	8 754	24,41	19 408	55,83
František Benda	ODS	9 684	27,00	15 353	44,17
Josef Kalbáč	KDU-ČSL	6 898	19,23	—	—
Vítězslava Baborová	KSČM	5 229	14,58	—	—
Jiří Kotas	Independent	1 813	5,06	—	—
Elvíra Tomášková	Independent	1 618	4,51	—	—
Jan Žák	ČSNS	1 352	3,77	—	—
Miloslav Gebr	NEZ	517	1,44	—	—

=== 2002 ===
2002 Czech Senate election in Strakonice
Candidate	Party	1st round		2nd round	
Candidate	Party	Votes	%	Votes	%
Pavel Rychetský	ČSSD	7 918	29,20	19 090	50,89
Pavel Pavel	ODS	7 488	27,61	18 418	49,10
Karel Schwarzenberg	US-DEU	6 371	23,49	—	—
Pavel Poláček	KSČM	3 311	12,21	—	—
Zdeněk Prokopec	SNK ED	2 023	7,46	—	—

=== 2003 ===
By-election in the district was held after Pavel Rychetský was named as the President of the Constitutional Court of the Czech Republic.

2003 Czech Senate by-elections in Strakonice
Candidate	Party	1st round		2nd round	
Candidate	Party	Votes	%	Votes	%
Josef Kalbáč	KDU-ČSL	3 639	18,16	7 321	53,48
Pavel Pavel	ODS	5 697	28,43	6 375	46,54
Karel Rodina	KSČM	3 388	16,91	—	—
Petr Pumpr	SNK ED	2 516	12,55	—	—
Josef Vávra	Independent	2 428	12,12	—	—
Josef Samec	ČSSD	1 269	6,33	—	—
Jan Rampich	ODA	1 096	5,47	—	—

=== 2008 ===
2008 Czech Senate election in Strakonice
Candidate	Party	1st round		2nd round	
Candidate	Party	Votes	%	Votes	%
Miroslav Krejča	ČSSD	11 273	28,58	15 855	51,77
Josef Kalbáč	KDU-ČSL	9 183	23,28	14 768	48,22
Miroslav Beneš	ODS	8 816	22,35	—	—
Taťána Jirousová	KSČM	6 279	15,92	—	—
Pavel Buček	SZ	2 390	6,06	—	—
Vilém Mikula	ČSNS 2005, SZR	777	1,97	—	—
Iveta Vilímková	SDŽ	719	1,82	—	—

=== 2014 ===
2014 Czech Senate election in Strakonice
Candidate	Party	1st round		2nd round	
Candidate	Party	Votes	%	Votes	%
Karel Kratochvíle	ČSSD	6 800	16,38	8 505	51,25
Martin Gregora	TOP 09, STAN	7 903	19,03	8 088	48,74
Jiří Mánek	ODS	5 802	13,97	—	—
Robert Huneš	KDU-ČSL	5 518	13,29	—	—
Vítězslava Baborová	KSČM	5 376	12,95	—	—
Mario Vlček	ANO 2011	3 929	9,46	—	—
Miroslav Krejča	Republic	2 867	6,90	—	—
Petr Martan	SPO	1 585	3,81	—	—
Václav Trojan	Svobodní	962	2,31	—	—
Elvíra Tomášková	Dawn	766	1,84	—	—

=== 2020 ===
2020 Czech Senate election in Strakonice
Candidate	Party	1st round		2nd round	
Candidate	Party	Votes	%	Votes	%
Tomáš Fiala	ODS	10 538	27,84	8 238	50,13
Luboš Peterka	KDU-ČSL	5 681	15,01	8 193	49,86
Petr Kalina	ANO 2011	5 357	14,15	—	—
Michal Horák	Pirates	3 410	9,01	—	—
Karel Kratochvíle	ČSSD	3 395	8,97	—	—
Marek Anděl	PÍSEK SOBĚ	1 898	5,01	—	—
Ivana Zelenková	STAN	1 664	4,39	—	—
Pavel Štětina	KSČM	1 661	4,38	—	—
Miroslav Šobr	Independent	1 494	3,94	—	—
Miroslav Ušatý	Tricolour	1 432	3,78	—	—
Petra Kurschová	Independent	1 314	3,47	—	—

=== 2026 ===
2026 Czech Senate election in Strakonice
Candidate	Party	1st round	
Candidate	Party	Votes	%
Tomáš Fiala	Our Czechia	24 643	55,41
Miroslav Ušatý	Svobodní, SPD, Tricolour	10 629	23,90
Jana Hrdinová	KDU-ČSL	9 195	20,67
