= Senate district 78 – Zlín =

Electoral district in the Czech Republic

78 – Zlín
- inline Senate district of the Czech Republic

- The Zlín district on a map
- Senator: Tomáš Goláň; ODS
- Region: Zlín
- District: Zlín; Vsetín
- Last election: 2026
- Next election: 2032

Senate district 78 – Zlín is an electoral district of the Senate of the Czech Republic, located in the northern part of the Zlín District and the southern part of the Vsetín District. Tomáš Goláň is the senator for the district since 2018. Elected as a SEN 21 candidate, he later joined ODS in 2020.

== Senators ==
Year	Senator	Party
1996	Irena Ondrová	ODS
2002	Alena Gajdůšková	ČSSD
2008	Alena Gajdůšková	ČSSD
2014	František Čuba	SPO
2018	Tomáš Goláň	SEN 21
2020	Tomáš Goláň	SEN 21
2026	Tomáš Goláň	ODS

== Election results ==
=== 1996 ===
1996 Czech Senate election in Zlín
Candidate	Party	1st round		2nd round	
Candidate	Party	Votes	%	Votes	%
Irena Ondrová	ODS	12 768	35,87	14 075	52,64
Jaromír Schneider	KDU-ČSL	7 497	21,06	12 663	47,36
Věra Chytilová	ČSSD	6 541	18,37	—	—
Olga Gröschlová	ODA	4 077	11,45	—	—
Václav Unzeitig	KSČM	3 285	9,23	—	—
Alexander Gola	MSLK 96	692	1,94	—	—
Zdeněk Ušela	DEU	429	1,21	—	—
Marek Pánek	NEI	309	0,87	—	—

=== 2002 ===
2002 Czech Senate election in Zlín
Candidate	Party	1st round		2nd round	
Candidate	Party	Votes	%	Votes	%
Alena Gajdůšková	ČSSD	6 914	27,12	19 233	57,02
Irena Ondrová	ODS	7 741	30,36	14 495	42,97
Jan Slezák	US-DEU	3 400	13,33	—	—
František Rábek	KSČM	2 655	10,41	—	—
Olga Gröschlová	ODA	2 355	9,23	—	—
Svatopluk Sládeček	PB	1 262	4,95	—	—
Miroslav Holáň	Independent	668	2,62	—	—
Ludvík Maděra	VPB	496	1,94	—	—

=== 2008 ===
2008 Czech Senate election in Zlín
Candidate	Party	1st round		2nd round	
Candidate	Party	Votes	%	Votes	%
Alena Gajdůšková	ČSSD	18 973	44,50	20 570	63,67
Miroslav Šindlář	ODS	9 132	21,42	11 737	36,32
Josef Devát	KDU-ČSL	5 472	12,83	—	—
Pavel Jungmann	NSK	4 770	11,18	—	—
Radomír Rafaja	KSČM	2 872	6,73	—	—
Mojmír Novák	NEZ	1 027	2,40	—	—
Zdeněk Vítek	SDŽ	386	0,90	—	—

=== 2014 ===
2014 Czech Senate election in Zlín
Candidate	Party	1st round		2nd round	
Candidate	Party	Votes	%	Votes	%
František Čuba	SPO	10 333	23,89	11 971	54,01
Alena Gajdůšková	ČSSD	10 240	23,68	10 193	45,98
Aleš Dufek	KDU-ČSL, Z21	7 704	17,81	—	—
Petr Žůrek	STAN	4 223	9,76	—	—
Aloisie Jurkovičová	ANO	2 854	6,59	—	—
Jiří Sýkora	ODS	2 349	5,43	—	—
Jan Bravenec	Dawn	1 357	3,13	—	—
Olga Křížová	Republic	1 337	3,09	—	—
Vlastislav Antolák	KSČM	936	2,16	—	—
Jan Zlínský	NEZ	914	2,11	—	—
Luděk Maděra	Pirates	830	1,91	—	—
Karel Nedbálek	ČS	166	0,38	—	—

=== 2018 (by-election) ===
2018 Czech Senate by-election in Zlín
Candidate	Party	1st round		2nd round	
Candidate	Party	Votes	%	Votes	%
Tomáš Goláň	SEN 21	3 234	18,99	5 991	53,78
Michaela Blahová	KDU-ČSL	4 118	24,18	5 148	46,21
Miroslav Adámek	STAN	2 786	16,36	—	—
Michal Filip	ANO	2 211	12,98	—	—
Aleš Fuksa	Pirates	1 559	9,15	—	—
Radim Jünger	ČSSD	1 270	7,45	—	—
Radomír Rafaja	KSČM	896	5,26	—	—
Lubomír Nečas	SPOZ	697	4,09	—	—
Karel Nedbálek	ČS	254	1,49	—	—

=== 2020 ===
2020 Czech Senate election in Zlín
Candidate	Party	1st round		2nd round	
Candidate	Party	Votes	%	Votes	%
Tomáš Goláň	SEN 21	14 485	32,53	10 738	58,94
Pavel Stodůlka	NEZ	10 642	23,90	7 479	41,05
Petr Michálek	STAN	6 637	14,90	—	—
Michaela Blahová	KDU-ČSL	5 631	12,64	—	—
Radek Henner	SPD	3 519	7,90	—	—
Jan Doleček	KSČM	2 027	4,55	—	—
Jan Šťovíček	MZH	1 579	3,54	—	—

=== 2026 ===
2026 Czech Senate election in Zlín
Candidate	Party	1st round		2nd round	
Candidate	Party	Votes	%	Votes	%
Tomáš Goláň	ODS, KDU-ČSL, TOP 09	15 627	33,54	10 438	62,15
Ivo Mitáček	STAN	10 638	22,83	6 356	37,84
Vladimír Sedlařík	ANO 2011	8 794	18,87	—	—
Pavel Dlouhý	SEN 21	5 667	12,16	—	—
Lubomír Nečas	SPD	4 987	10,70	—	—
Jan Doleček	KSČM	868	1,86	—	—
