= Kadov =

Kadov may refer to places in the Czech Republic:

- Kadov (Strakonice District), a municipality and village in the South Bohemian Region
- Kadov (Žďár nad Sázavou District), a municipality and village in the Vysočina Region
- Kadov (Znojmo District), a municipality and village in the South Moravian Region
