= List of Czech senate by-elections =

This is a list of by-elections for Czech Senate.

Date	Districts	Incumbents	Elected senators	Cause
1999 Prague 1 by-election	Prague 1	Václav Benda (ODS)	Václav Fischer (NK)	Death
2003 Czech Senate by-elections	Strakonice, Brno-City District	Pavel Rychetský (ČSSD), Dagmar Lastovecká (ODS)	Josef Kalbáč (KDU-ČSL), Karel Jarůšek (ODS)	Incompatible office: Elected to the Constitutional Court
2004 Czech Senate by-elections	Prague 4, Znojmo	Josef Zieleniec (SNK ED), Vladimír Železný (NK)	František Příhoda (ODS), Milan Špaček (KDU-ČSL)	Incompatible office: Elected to European Parliament
2007 Czech Senate by-elections	Chomutov, Přerov	Petr Skála (NK), Jitka Seitlová (NK)	Václav Homolka (KSČM), Jiří Lajtoch ČSSD	Resignation and Incompatible office: Elected to European Parliament
2011 Kladno by-election	Kladno	Jiří Dienstbier (ČSSD)	Jiří Dienstbier Jr. (ČSSD)	Death
2014 Zlín by-election	Zlín	Tomio Okamura (Dawn)	Patrik Kunčar (KDU-ČSL)	Incompatible office: Elected to the Chamber of Deputies
2014 Prague 10 by-election	Prague 10	Jaromír Štětina (TOP 09)	Ivana Cabrnochová (Green Party)	Incompatible office: Elected to European Parliament
2018 Trutnov by-election	Trutnov	Jiří Hlavatý (ANO 2011)	Jan Sobotka (STAN)	Incompatible office: Elected to the Chamber of Deputies
2018 Zlín by-election	Zlín	František Čuba (SPO)	Tomáš Goláň (Senátor 21)	Resignation
2019 Prague 9 by-election	Prague 9	Zuzana Baudyšová (ANO 2011)	David Smoljak (STAN)	Resignation
2020 Teplice by-election	Teplice	Jaroslav Kubera (ODS)	Hynek Hanza (ODS)	Death
2025 Brno-City by-election	Brno-City	Roman Kraus (ODS)	Zdeněk Papoušek (ODS)	Death
