= Senate district 22 – Prague 10 =

Electoral district in the Czech Republic

Coordinates: 50°03′55″N 14°31′54″E

22 – Prague 10
- inline Senate district of the Czech Republic

- The Prague-10 district on a map
- Senator: Jan Pirk; TOP 09
- Region: Capital City of Prague
- District: Prague
- Electorate: 81703
- Area: 29.52 km²
- Last election: 2022
- Next election: 2028

Senate district 22 – Prague 10 is an electoral district of the Senate of the Czech Republic, located in the Capital City of Prague. Since 2022, Jan Pirk, a TOP 09 nominee, is senator for the district.

== Senators ==
Year	Senator	Party
1996 (Note: Election for shortened two-year term)	Milan Kondr	ODS
1998	Zuzana Roithová	4KOALICE
2004	Jaromír Štětina	SZ
2010	Jaromír Štětina	TOP 09
2014	Ivana Cabrnochová	SZ
2016	Renata Chmelová	KDU-ČSL
2022	Jan Pirk	TOP 09

== Election results ==
=== 1996 ===
1996 Czech Senate election in Prague 10
Candidate	Party	1st round	
Candidate	Party	Votes	%
Milan Kondr	ODS	23 583	50,84
Václav Kordač	ČSSD	8 813	19,00
Oldřich Choděra	KDU-ČSL	5 242	11,30
Petr Kaifoš	KSČM	4 121	8,88
Alena Hromádková	DEU	3 303	7,12
František Svoboda	ČSNS	738	1,59
Jaroslav Anděl	PB	587	1,27

=== 1998 ===
1998 Czech Senate election in Prague 10
Candidate	Party	1st round		2nd round	
Candidate	Party	Votes	%	Votes	%
Zuzana Roithová	4KOALICE	15 333	39,54	21 575	67,10
Milan Kondr	ODS	12 031	31,03	10 578	32,90
Karel Výrut	ČSSD	6 601	17,02	—	—
Petr Zajíček	KSČM	3 612	9,31	—	—
Věra Řezníčková	SZ	1 200	3,09	—	—

=== 2004 ===
2004 Czech Senate election in Prague 10
Candidate	Party	1st round		2nd round	
Candidate	Party	Votes	%	Votes	%
Jaromír Štětina	SZ	7 137	24,70	13 296	55,32
Jan Malypetr	ODS	10 068	34,84	10 735	44,67
Marie Alušíková	ČSSD	3 425	11,85	—	—
Karel Hošek	KSČM	2 864	9,91	—	—
Milan Kudyn	ED	2 383	8,24	—	—
Lubomír Mlčoch	KDU-ČSL	1 811	6,26	—	—
Blanka Misconiová	ODA	538	1,86	—	—
John Bok	BPS	429	1,48	—	—
Antonín Gondolán	NEZ	191	0,66	—	—
Jan Skácel	ČHNJ	44	0,15	—	—

=== 2010 ===
2010 Czech Senate election in Prague 10
Candidate	Party	1st round		2nd round	
Candidate	Party	Votes	%	Votes	%
Jaromír Štětina	TOP 09, STAN	11 210	31,01	10 794	57,50
Vladislav Lipovský	ODS	8 708	24,09	7 976	42,49
Miroslav Svoboda	ČSSD	6 644	18,38	—	—
Jana Bobošíková	Suverenity	3 326	9,20	—	—
Lubomír Ledl	KSČM	2 139	5,91	—	—
Eva Stříteská	SZ	2 012	5,56	—	—
Karel Duchek	KDU-ČSL	704	1,94	—	—
Jaroslav Vocelka	VV	633	1,75	—	—
Miroslav Suja	DSZ	411	1,13	—	—
Eva Svoboda	SPOZ	208	0,57	—	—
Bohdan Babinec	ČSNS 2005	149	0,41	—	—

=== 2014 ===
2014 Czech Senate by-elections in Prague 10
Candidate	Party	1st round		2nd round	
Candidate	Party	Votes	%	Votes	%
Ivana Cabrnochová	SZ, ČSSD	2 092	15,83	3 664	50,91
Jana Dušková	ANO 2011	2 060	15,59	3 532	49,08
Renata Sabongui	TOP 09, STAN	2 055	15,55	—	—
Antonín Panenka	NPP10-HPLD	1 776	13,44	—	—
Oldřich Choděra	ODS	1 564	11,83	—	—
Lubomír Chudoba	KDU-ČSL, LES	1 293	9,78	—	—
Jiří Payne	Svobodní	977	7,39	—	—
Milan Neubert	KSČM	954	7,22	—	—
Miroslav Kos	SNOP13	399	3,01	—	—
Pavel Jánský	ČS	43	0,32	—	—

=== 2016 ===
2016 Czech Senate election in Prague 10
Candidate	Party	1st round		2nd round	
Candidate	Party	Votes	%	Votes	%
Renata Chmelová	KDU-ČSL, Pirates, LES, DPD	5 459	22,80	8 255	57,45
Jiří Holubář	TOP 09, STAN	4 741	19,80	6 114	42,54
Eva Kislingerová	ANO 2011	3 619	15,12	—	—
Ivana Cabrnochová	SZ, ČSSD	3 038	12,69	—	—
Zdeněk Schwarz	HPP	2 360	9,86	—	—
Irena Bartoňová Pálková	ODS	2 222	9,28	—	—
Ludmila Nedělkova	KSČM	1 523	6,36	—	—
Miroslav Koranda	Patriots CZ	632	2,64	—	—
Antonín Slováček	SsČR	207	0,86	—	—
Josef Hőrl	ČSNS 2005	133	0,55	—	—

=== 2022 ===
2022 Czech Senate election in Prague 10
Candidate	Party	1st round		2nd round	
Candidate	Party	Votes	%	Votes	%
Jan Pirk	TOP 09, KDU-ČSL, ODS	14 846	44,77	9 796	60,44
Renata Chmelová	STAN, Greens, LES, SEN 21	8 075	24,35	6 410	39,55
Helena Leisztner	ANO 2011	3 838	11,57	—	—
Jiří Kobza	SPD	3 514	10,59	—	—
Bohumil Zoufalík	NPP10-HPLD	1 984	5,98	—	—
Štěpán Kavur	ČSSD	898	2,70	—	—
