= Senate district 80 – Zlín =

Electoral district in the Czech Republic

80 – Zlín
- inline Senate district of the Czech Republic

- The Zlín district on a map
- Senator: Oldřich Hájek; ANO 2011
- Region: Zlín
- District: Zlín; Uherské Hradiště
- Last election: 2024
- Next election: 2030

Senate district 80 – Zlín is an electoral district of the Senate of the Czech Republic, located in the southern part of the Zlín District and the northern part of the Uherské Hradiště District. Since 2024, the Senator for the district has been Oldřich Hájek.

== Senators ==
Year	Senator	Party
1996	Jiří Stodůlka	KDU-ČSL
2000	Jiří Stodůlka	KDU-ČSL
2006	Jana Juřenčáková	NSK
2012	Tomio Okamura	Independent
2014	Patrik Kunčar	KDU-ČSL
2018	Patrik Kunčar	KDU-ČSL
2024	Oldřich Hájek	ANO

== Election results ==
=== 1996 ===
1996 Czech Senate election in Zlín
Candidate	Party	1st round		2nd round	
Candidate	Party	Votes	%	Votes	%
Jiří Stodůlka	KDU-ČSL	9 006	29,48	13 807	60,16
Zdeněk Dostál	ODS	9 619	31,48	9 144	39,84
Luděk Sudek	ČSSD	6 089	19,93	—	—
Eduard Mück	KSČM	3 503	11,47	—	—
František Janků	MSLK 96	1 359	4,45	—	—
Jiří Volařík	DEU	976	3,19	—	—

=== 2000 ===
2000 Czech Senate election in Zlín
Candidate	Party	1st round		2nd round	
Candidate	Party	Votes	%	Votes	%
Jiří Stodůlka	KDU-ČSL	11 038	33,93	10 648	51,01
Stanislav Mišák	ČSSD	12 771	39,25	10 226	48,98
Milan Katolický	KSČM	4 424	13,59	—	—
Ladislav Kocman	ODS	4 298	13,21	—	—

=== 2006 ===
2006 Czech Senate election in Zlín
Candidate	Party	1st round		2nd round	
Candidate	Party	Votes	%	Votes	%
Jana Juřenčáková	NSK	7 548	19,18	8 754	58,58
Jiří Stodůlka	KDU-ČSL	9 055	23,01	6 188	41,41
Michal V. Marek	ODS	7 523	19,12	—	—
Jan Uherka	ČSSD	7 359	18,70	—	—
Josef Čejka	KSČM	5 211	13,24	—	—
Ladislav Pilka	„21“	1 277	3,24	—	—
Mojmír Novák	NEZ	1 165	2,96	—	—
Jiří Vavřínek	ČP	198	0,50	—	—

=== 2012 ===
2012 Czech Senate election in Zlín
Candidate	Party	1st round		2nd round	
Candidate	Party	Votes	%	Votes	%
Tomio Okamura	Independent	11 772	30,27	17 401	66,23
Stanislav Mišák	ČSSD	9 740	25,05	8 871	33,76
Ludvík Hovorka	KDU-ČSL	6 398	16,45	—	—
Jana Juřenčáková	STAN, ZHN	4 736	12,18	—	—
František Hubáček	ODS	2 896	7,44	—	—
Václav Ransdorf	KSČM	2 896	7,44	—	—
Ivo Spáčil	NÁR.SOC.	176	0,45	—	—

=== 2014 (by-election) ===
2014 Czech Senate by-election in Zlín
Candidate	Party	1st round		2nd round	
Candidate	Party	Votes	%	Votes	%
Patrik Kunčar	KDU-ČSL	5 363	23,36	10 161	63,16
Libor Lukáš	ODS	3 792	16,52	5 925	36,83
Milena Kovaříková	ČSSD	3 695	16,09	—	—
Pavel Talaš	Dawn	2 967	12,92	—	—
Jana Juřenčáková	NEZ	2 949	12,84	—	—
Radomír Rafaja	KSČM	1 686	7,34	—	—
Zuzana Lapčíková	STAN, ZHN	1 613	7,02	—	—
Jiří Remeš	Svobodní	529	2,30	—	—
Luděk Maděra	Pirates	359	1,56	—	—

=== 2018 ===
2018 Czech Senate election in Zlín
Candidate	Party	1st round		2nd round	
Candidate	Party	Votes	%	Votes	%
Patrik Kunčar	KDU-ČSL	13 875	33,39	11 117	60,77
Libor Lukáš	Freeholders	11 308	27,21	7 176	39,22
Jana Juřenčáková	REAL	4 699	11,31	—	—
Radek Henner	SPD	3 808	9,16	—	—
Milena Kovaříková	ČSSD	3 390	8,16	—	—
Jan Popelka	SPOZ	2 644	6,36	—	—
František Jordák	KSČM	1 819	4,37	—	—

=== 2024 ===
2024 Czech Senate election in Zlín
Candidate	Party	1st round		2nd round	
Candidate	Party	Votes	%	Votes	%
Oldřich Hájek	ANO	10 534	36,94	8 826	52,16
Patrik Kunčar	KDU-ČSL	7 460	26,16	8 095	47,83
David Rumpík	Independent	4 196	14,71	—	—
Jana Juřenčáková	NEZ	2 940	10,31	—	—
Barbora Fojtáchová	PRO 2022	1 828	6,41	—	—
Zbyněk Ziggy Horváth	STAN	1 556	5,45	—	—
