= Ledl =

Ledl is a German surname. Notable people with the surname include:

- Lotte Ledl (1930–2025), Austrian actress
- Lubomír Ledl (1952–2021), Czech politician
