= 2003 Czech Senate by-elections =

By-elections for Strakonice and Brno-City District Senate seats were held in the Czech Republic in October and November 2003. Election in Strakonice was held on 30 October-1 November and 7–8 November. Election in Brno-City was held on 7–8 November and 14–15 November. Elections were won by Josef Kalbáč in Strakonice and by Karel Jarůšek in Brno-City. Elections were held after incumbent Senators were appointed Judges of Constitutional Court of the Czech Republic.

== Strakonice ==
2003 Czech senate by-election
30 October-1 November and 7–8 November
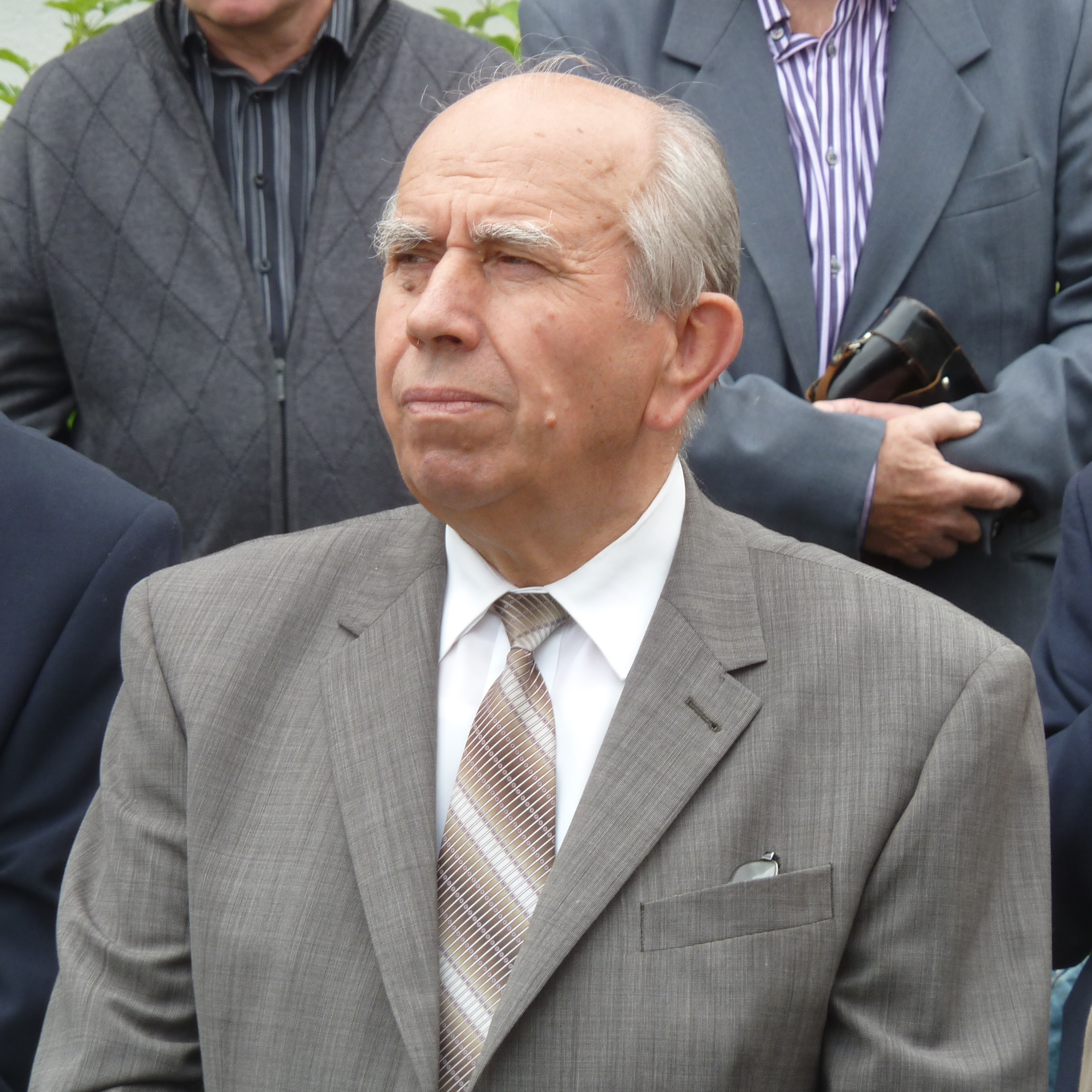

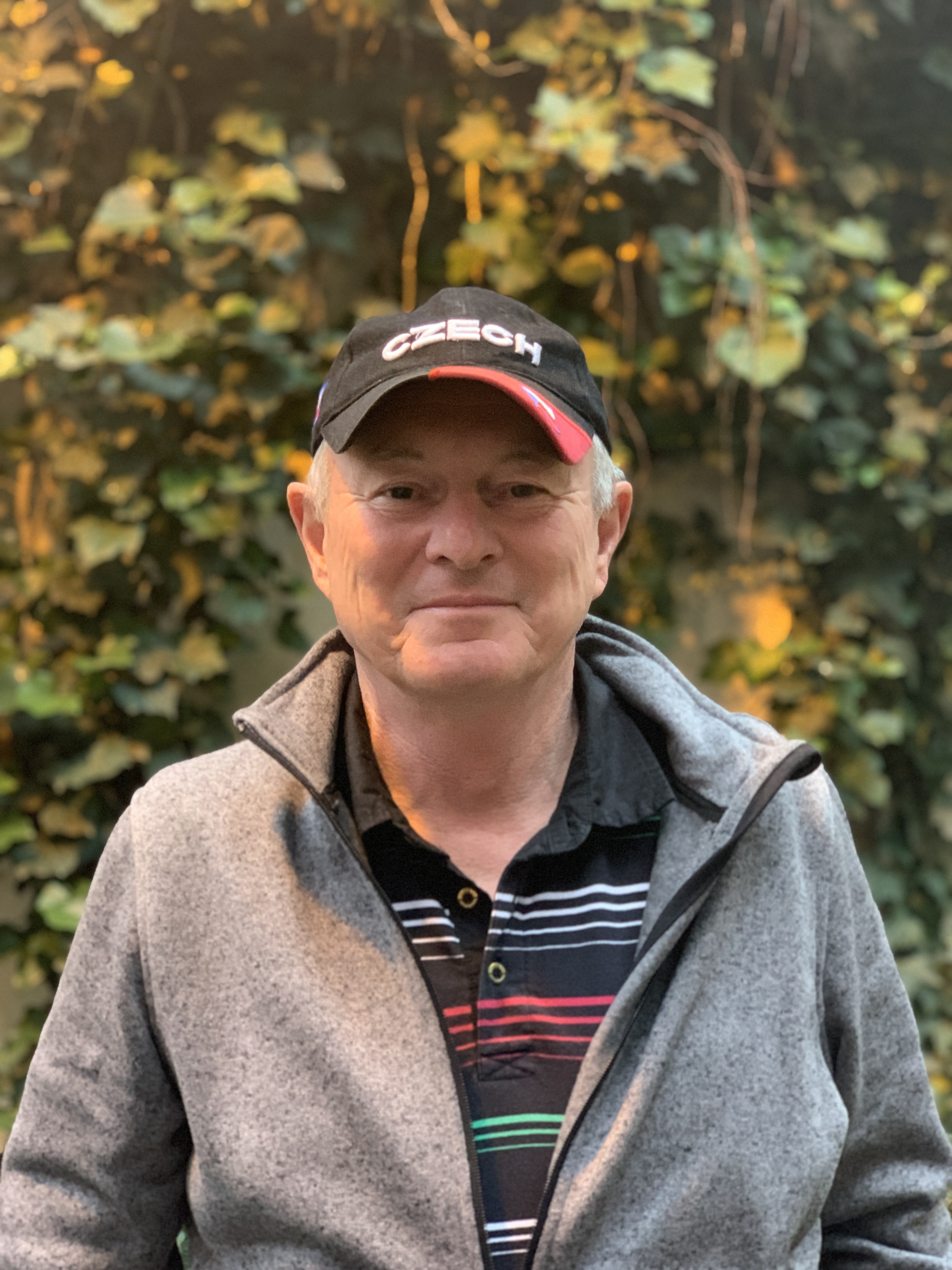
	First party	Second party
Candidate	Josef Kalbáč	Pavel Pavel
Party	Lidovci	ODS
Popular vote	7,321	6,375
Percentage	53.5%	46.5%

Main candidates were Pavel Pavel and Josef Kalbáč who faced each other in second round. Kalbáč won the second round.

Candidate	Party	First round		Second round	
Candidate	Party	Votes	%	Votes	%
Josef Kalbáč	Christian and Democratic Union – Czechoslovak People's Party	3,639	18.16	7,321	53.48
Pavel Pavel	Civic Democratic Party	5,697	28.43	6,375	46.54
Karel Rodina	Communist Party of Bohemia and Moravia	3,388	16.91		
Petr Pumpr	SNK European Democrats	2,516	12.55		
Josef Vávra	Independent	2,428	12.12		
Josef Samec	Czech Social Democratic Party	1,269	6.33		
Jan Rampich	Civic Democratic Alliance	1,096	5.47		
Overall		20,033	100	13,809	100

== Brno-City ==
2003 Czech senate by-election
7–8 November and 14–15 November
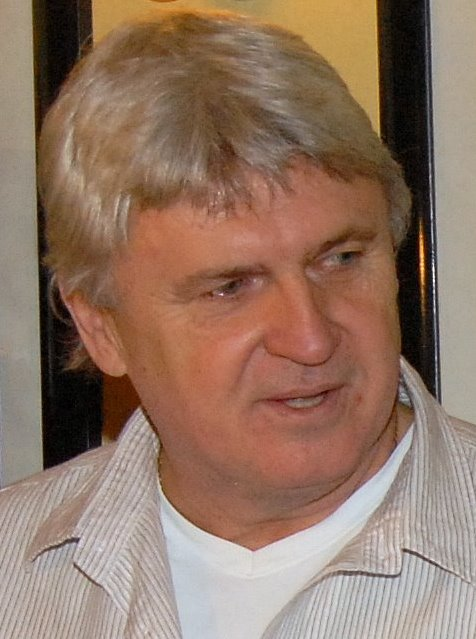

	First party	Second party
Candidate	Karel Jarůšek	Rostislav Slavotínek
Party	ODS	Lidovci
Popular vote	4,761	4,740
Percentage	50.1%	49.9%

Candidates included football manager Karel Jarůšek, Brno Councillor Rostislav Slavotínek, Minister of Health Marie Součková, Daniel Borecký and Journalist Petr Cibulka. Karel Jarůšek won the election when he defeated Rostislav Slavotínek in the second round. Minister Součková was eliminated in the first round when she received only 7.5% of votes which she blamed on strong campaign against her.

Candidate	Party	First round		Second round	
Candidate	Party	Votes	%	Votes	%
Karel Jarůšek	Civic Democratic Party	4,858	31.63	4,761	50.11
Rostislav Slavotínek	Christian and Democratic Union – Czechoslovak People's Party	2,822	18.37	4,740	49.88
Daniel Borecký	Communist Party of Bohemia and Moravia	2,267	14.76		
Petr Cibulka	Right Bloc	2,043	13.30		
Jiří Löw	Liberal Reform Party	1,952	12.7		
Marie Součková	Czech Social Democratic Party	1,155	7.52		
Jiří Vachek	Independent	261	1.69		
Overall		15.358	100	9,551	100
