= Faculty of Law, Charles University =

Faculty of Charles University

Charles University Faculty of Law
- Type: public
- Established: 1348; 678 years ago
- Dean: Radim Boháč
- Students: c. 3.800 (2012)
- Location: Prague, Czech Republic; 50°5′29.68″N 14°25′2.1″E
- Campus: urban
- Website: www.prf.cuni.cz

The Faculty of Law of Charles University (Czech: Právnická fakulta Univerzity Karlovy) is one of the original four faculties of Charles University in Prague, Czech Republic. Founded in 1348 by Charles IV on the basis of a bull of Pope Clement VI, it is the oldest law school in the Czech Republic and Central Europe.

== History and notable people ==
In 1372, the faculty separated into an independent university of law, which was dissolved at the beginning of the Hussite Wars. The law school was not reestablished until 1624. The present law school derives its form from the division of the entire university into Czech and German parts in 1882.

Among the school's notable academics, scholars and graduates are Alois von Brinz, Joseph Unger, Eduard Herbst, Emil Sax, Leopold Hasner von Artha, Hans Kelsen, Josef Kaizl, Alois Rašín, presidents of Czechoslovakia Edvard Beneš and Emil Hácha, Milada Horáková, prime ministers of the Czech Republic Petr Pithart and Stanislav Gross, Vice-President of the European Commission Věra Jourová, presidents of the Constitutional Court of the Czech Republic and Czechoslovakia Karel Baxa, Pavel Rychetský and Josef Baxa. Honorary members of the lawyers' association based on the faculty include Václav Klaus, former president of the Czech Republic, and Sir Roger Scruton.

== Organization of study ==
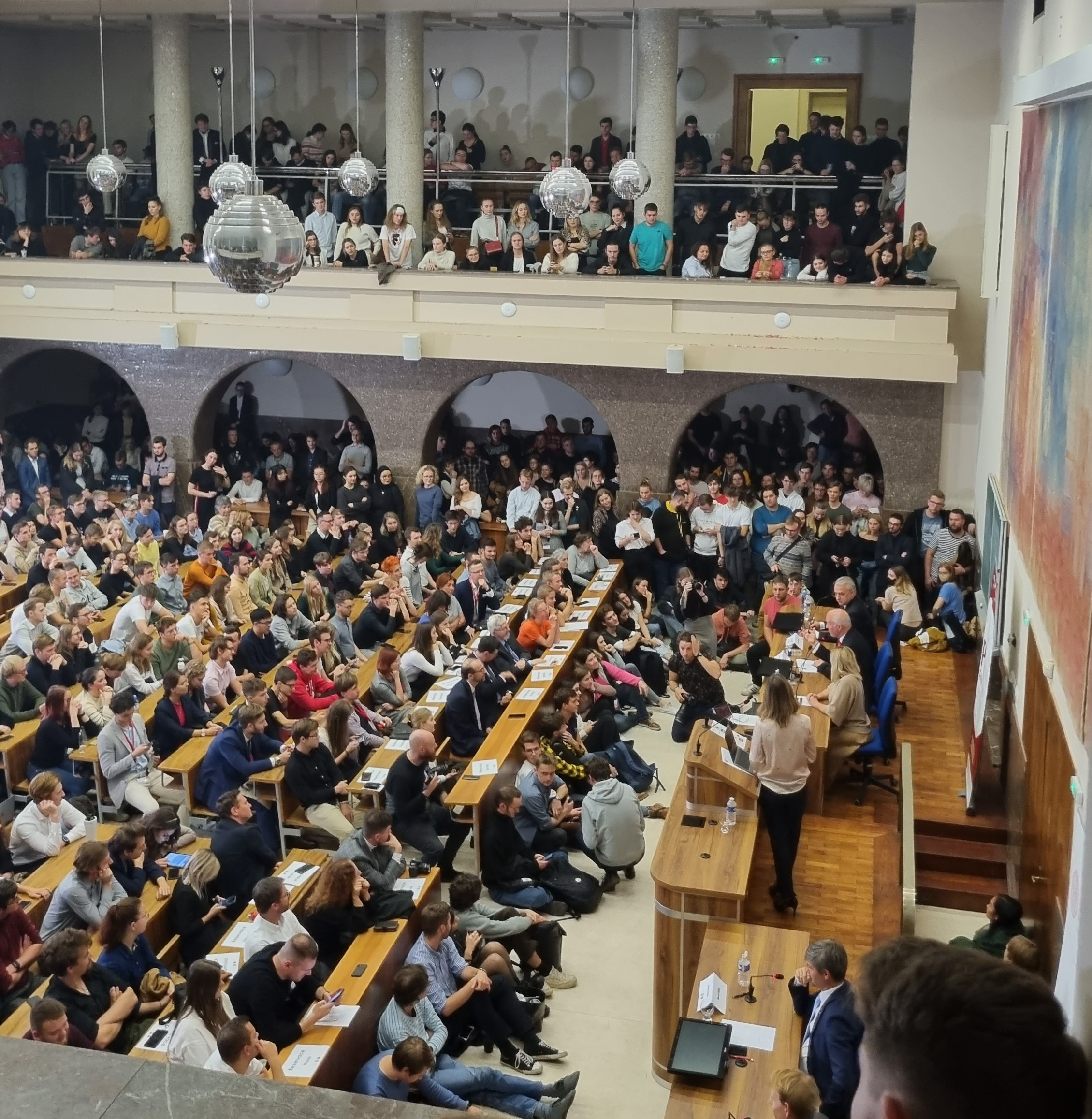
Collegium Maximum auditorium in the school

The school offers a five-year magister degree program in law, which is completed by a state examination and the defense of a thesis. Teaching takes the form of lectures, seminars, moot courts and internships. After passing the state rigorous examination, which includes the defense of the rigorous thesis, the graduates can receive the academic degree Doctor of Law (JUDr.). Students can continue their studies in the four-year doctoral program, graduates of which receive the doctorate (Ph.D.).

The school also offers postgraduate specialized Master of Laws (LL.M.) courses for both Czech and foreign lawyers, including five specializations in English: The Law and Business in the Czech Republic and Central Europe, International Human Rights Law and Protection of Environment, Health and Law, International Disputes Settlement and Competition Law.

As of 2024, the school is ranked 1st in the Czech Republic and 176–200 in the world by Times Higher Education.

== International cooperations ==
The school cooperates with dozens of law schools and universities in student and academic exchanges. In addition to Erasmus Programme and European universities, the school has cooperation agreements with Tel Aviv University, Bar Ilan University, National University of Singapore, Soochow University, University of San Francisco, Nova Southeastern University and South Texas College of Law, among others.

== Faculty building ==
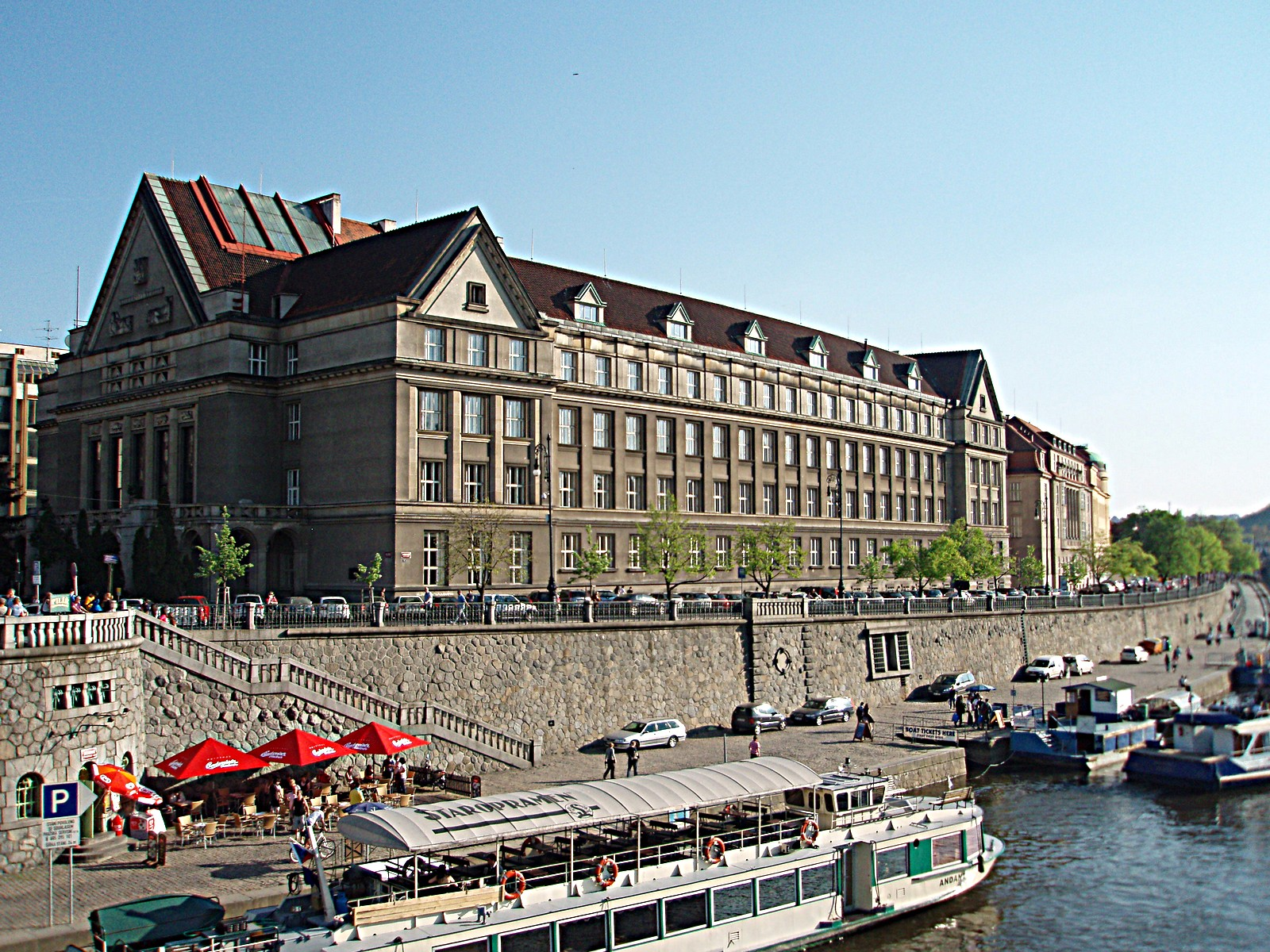
Building of the Faculty of Law

The law school is housed in a listed Neoclassical building constructed between 1924 and 1931 on the bank of the Vltava River, a significant architectural landmark designed by Jan Kotěra.

Its marble main hall has become a popular location for domestic and foreign filmmakers. The building served as headquarters of the Nazi authorities in a couple of films and was actually the headquarters of the Waffen-SS during World War II. It has appeared in scenes featuring Karel Čapek's lectures and Joseph Goebbels' speeches.
