= Jiří Kobza =

Czech politician

Jiří Kobza MP
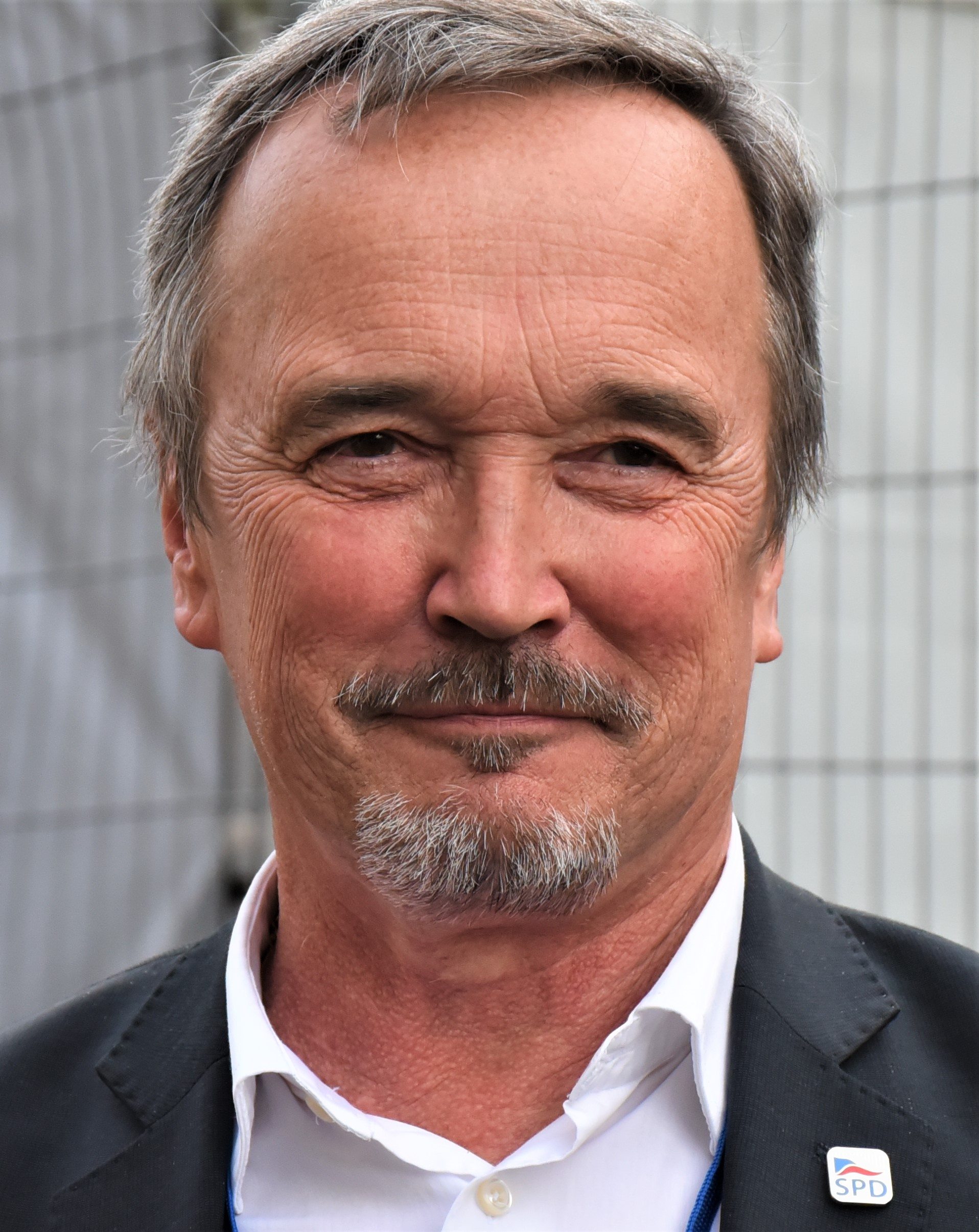

Member of the Chamber of Deputies
- In office 21 October 2017 – 8 October 2025

Personal details
- Born: 27 December 1955 (age 70) Prague, Czechoslovakia
- Party: Stačilo! (since 2025)
- Other political affiliations: KSČ (1987–1989); SPD (2015–2025)
- Children: 4
- Education: Charles University; Prague University of Economics and Business
- Occupation: Businessman • Diplomat • Politician

Jiří Kobza (born 27 December 1955) is a Czech politician, civil servant, businessman and former diplomatic attaché.

== Biography ==
Kobza studied geography at Charles University followed by postgraduate studies at the Prague University of Economics and Business.

He worked as a clerk at the foreign trade company Strojexport for seven years, before joining the Communist Party of Czechoslovakia in spring 1987, aged 31. He was also a member of the Czechoslovak Socialist Youth Union (SSM), Revoluční odborové hnutí (ROH) and ČSTV.

From 2000 to 2004 Kobza worked at the Czech Embassy in Tehran, initially as a trade consul, and later as the chargé d'affaires. He lived and worked in various countries in the Middle East specializing in the export of geological works, before providing development assistance to the Czech Ministry of Foreign Affairs, covering disasters such as the 2010 Haiti earthquake.

In 2015, he joined the far-right Freedom and Direct Democracy (SPD), and in 2017 was elected to the Chamber of Deputies for the Prague constituency. Kobza received media attention when he published a blog and a pamphlet instructing the public on how to defend themselves against the "Islamization" of the Czech Republic.

In 2022, he ran for the Senate in Prague 10, finishing 4th with 3,514 votes (10.59%), and was not elected.

In autumn 2024, Kobza endorsed Donald Trump in the 2024 United States presidential election, criticising Kamala Harris for her "Marxist background" and "left-wing ideology and progressivism". Kobza stated that he was a conservative, even though he had been a member of the communist party in the 1980s.

At the end of June 2025, Kobza left SPD after being a member for ten years.

On 24 July 2025, journalists reported that Kobza would be listed 5th on the candidate list for Stačilo! in the Central Bohemian Region in the 2025 Czech parliamentary election.

In 2026, he ran for the Senate in Louny, finishing last with 1,568 votes (3.43%), and was not elected.
