= Třebohostice =

- Municipality
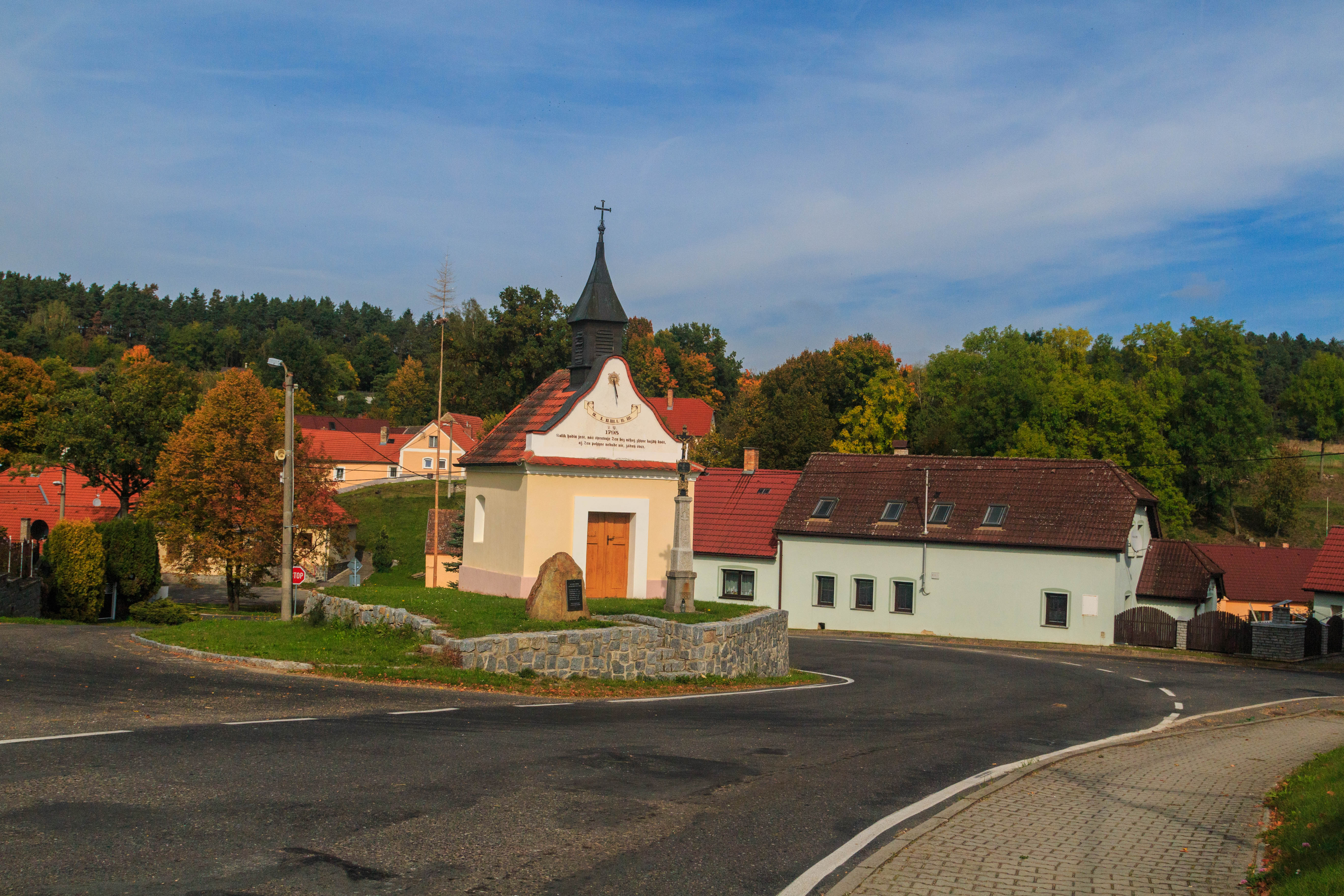
- Chapel of Saint John of Nepomuk

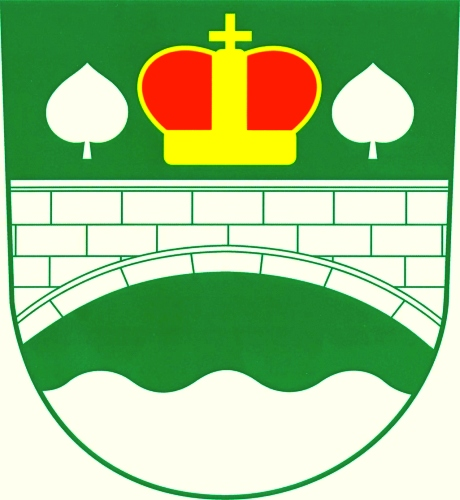
- Flag Coat of arms

- Location in the Czech Republic
- Coordinates: 49°19′57″N 13°51′40″E
- Country: Czech Republic
- Region: South Bohemian
- District: Strakonice
- First mentioned: 1357

Area
  - Total: 9.75 km^{2} (3.76 sq mi)
- Elevation: 484 m (1,588 ft)

Population (2026-01-01)
  - Total: 303
  - Density: 31.1/km^{2} (80.5/sq mi)
- Time zone: UTC+1 (CET)
  - Summer (DST): UTC+2 (CEST)
- Postal code: 386 01
- Website: www.obectrebohostice.cz

Třebohostice is a municipality and village in Strakonice District in the South Bohemian Region of the Czech Republic. It has about 300 inhabitants.

Třebohostice lies approximately 9 kilometres (6 mi) north-west of Strakonice, 61 km (38 mi) north-west of České Budějovice, and 94 km (58 mi) south-west of Prague.

== Administrative division ==
Třebohostice consists of two municipal parts (in brackets population according to the 2021 census):

- Třebohostice (134)
- Zadní Zborovice (171)

== Demographics ==
Historical population
Year	Pop.	±%
1869	652	—
1880	652	+0.0%
1890	600	−8.0%
1900	612	+2.0%
1910	619	+1.1%
1921	609	−1.6%
1930	550	−9.7%
1950	434	−21.1%
1961	411	−5.3%
1970	359	−12.7%
1980	311	−13.4%
1991	276	−11.3%
2001	285	+3.3%
2011	289	+1.4%
2021	305	+5.5%
Source: Censuses

== Notable people ==
- Josef Kalbáč (1940–2026), agronomer and politician
