= Josef Baxa =

Czech lawyer and judge (born 1959)

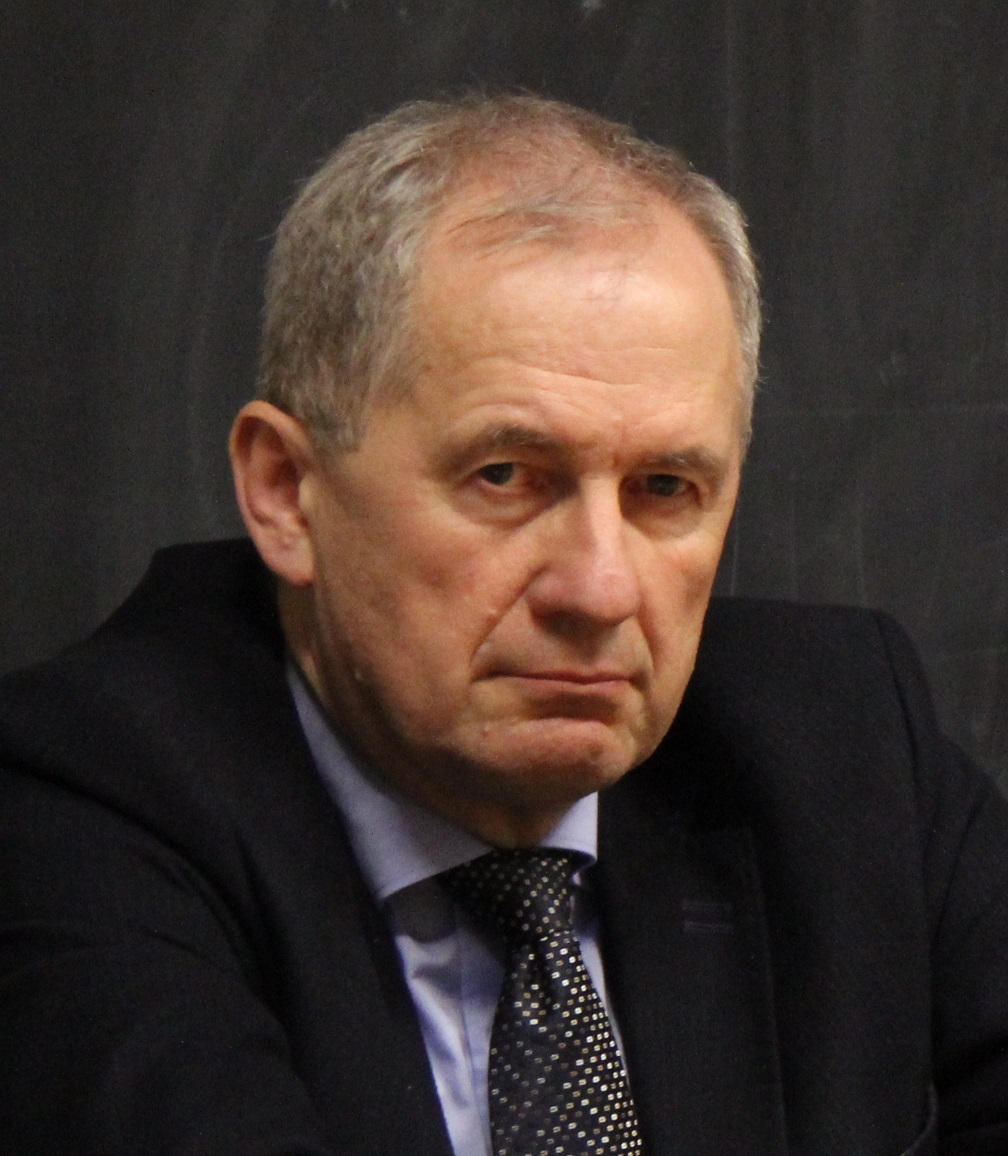

4th President of the Constitutional Court
- Incumbent
- Assumed office 8 August 2023
- Nominated by: Petr Pavel
- Preceded by: Pavel Rychetský

1st President of the Supreme Administrative Court of the Czech Republic
- In office 2 January 2003 – 30 September 2018
- Preceded by: office established
- Succeeded by: Michal Mazanec
- In office September 1998 – December 2002
- Preceded by: Pavel Zářecký
- Succeeded by: Vladimír Král

Deputy Minister of Justice of the Czech Republic

Personal details
- Born: 31 December 1959 (age 66) Klatovy, Czechoslovakia
- Education: Charles University

Josef Baxa (born 31 December 1959) is a Czech lawyer. He is the 4th President of the Constitutional Court of the Czech Republic since 2023.

Before joining the Constitutional Court, Baxa was the President of the Supreme Administrative Court of the Czech Republic and the Deputy Minister of Justice.

Baxa graduated from the Faculty of Law of Charles University with the thesis on Historical Development of Civil Legislation in the Czechoslovakia. After graduation, he joined the District Court in Plzeň. In 1983, he passed the rigorous examination and received the JUDr degree. After the Velvet Revolution, as a judge, he devoted himself to the rehabilitation of convicted citizens from the 1950s. He participated in the establishment of the Faculty of Law of University of West Bohemia in Plzeň, where he lectures on criminal law.

The Senate confirmed Baxa as Justice of the Constitutional Court on 31 May 2023 by 63 votes out of 79 senators present and on 5 June 2023 he was sworn in by President Petr Pavel. On 4 August 2023, Pavel appointed him President of the Constitutional Court, and he replaced Pavel Rychetský at the end of his term on 8 August 2023.
