= 2018 Zlín by-election =

By-election for the Zlín Senate seat in the Czech Republic

2018 Czech senate by-election
- 18 and 19 May 2018; 25 and 26 May 2018

	First party	Second party
Candidate	Tomáš Goláň	Michaela Blahová
Party	SEN 21	Christian and Democratic Union – Czechoslovak People's Party
Popular vote	5,991	5,148
Percentage	53.8%	46.2%

A by-election for the Zlín Senate seat in the Czech Republic was held on 18 and 19 May 2018 as a result of František Čuba's resignation. The second round was heldr 25 and 26 May 2018. Michaela Blahová and Tomáš Goláň advanced to second round. The election was surprisingly won by Tomáš Goláň. Voter turnout was very low.

== Background ==
František Čuba was elected Senator in 2014 as a candidate of the Party of Civic Rights. He was absent in the Senate since 2016 due to his health. He announced on 15 February 2018 that he will resign on his seat. He resigned on 28 February 2018.

Parties started to look for its candidates soon after Čuba announced his intention to resign. ANO 2011 had its candidate chosen at the time of Čuba's resignation but refused to announce his name. Civic Democratic Party was considering possible candidates at the time. Mayors and Independents offered nomination to Mayor of Zlín Miroslav Adámek. Michaela Blahová was speculated as a candidate of the Christian and Democratic Union – Czechoslovak People's Party. Czech Social Democratic Party expressed intention to have its candidate. Czech Pirate Party decided to find a candidate by publishing an advertisement in local media. Tomáš Goláň announced his candidacy as a candidate of Senátor 21 on 22 March 2018. He stated he wants to prove that Senate is an important part of Czech Constitutional system.

Nine candidates decided to run for the position. Miroslav Adámek was nominated by Mayors and Independents and supported by the Civic Democratic Party and TOP 09. Other candidates included Michaela Blahová nominated by KDU-ČSL, Michal Filip nominated by ANO 2011, Tomáš Goláň nominated by Senátor 21 or Radim Jünger nominated by ČSSD.

== Campaign ==
=== First round ===
Miroslav Adámek was considered front-runner of the election. Michal Filip and Michaela Blahová were considered his main rivals. Tomáš Goláň was also viewed as a strong candidate.

Adámek's campaign cost 300,000 CZK. He published a video spot that received mixed responses and had 15 billboards set up. He refused to have meetings with voters.

Goláň had the most expensive campaign. He had installed 17 billboards and three megaboards. His posters were also on 20 Trolleybuses and three Ticket Autommats. He held summer cinema at Čepkovo. Goláň himself was very active at social media.

Blahová focused on personal campaigning and social media. She also had posters at three bigboards, 50 yachts and 12 billboards.

The first round was held on 18 and 19 May 2018. Michaela Blahová and Tomáš Goláň advanced to second round. Goláň's success was unexpected. Miroslav Adámek admitted that he feels disappointment with his result but accepts it. Michaela Blahová stated that her success might be caused by the fact that she was the only female candidate in the election. She noted she will continue personal campaign. Goláň stated that his advancement to the second round was caused by jis campaign. He noted he will lead more intensive campaign for the second round. Communist Party candidate Rafaja admitted he is disappointed with the result as he expected that he could advance to the second round. Aleš Fuksa thanked Pirate Party for its support.

=== Second round ===
Blahová visited bigger towns within the district. It includes Valašské Klobouky, Fryšták or Slušovice. Her campaign was supported by Pavel Fischer. Goláň also led personal campaign in bigger towns. He visited Fryšták, Vizovice, Slušovice, Valašské Klobouky or Zlín. He focused on voters of Miroslav Adámek and Aleš Fuksa. Goláň received endorsement from the Pirate Party. He launched second phase of his campaign on 24 May when he campaigned in Zlín. He concluded his campaign on 25 May when he met citizens at Baťa's institute.

Second round was held on 25 and 26 May 2018. First preliminary results showed candidates tied but Goláň started leading when more votes were counted. Goláň's supporters started celebrating when 70% of votes were counted and Goláň was leading. He eventually received 5,991 votes while Blahová only 5,148.

=== Campaign finances ===
Candidate	Party	Money Spent
Tomáš Goláň	Senátor 21	1,000,000 CZK
Michaela Blahová	Christian and Democratic Union – Czechoslovak People's Party	750,000 CZK
Miroslav Adámek	Mayors and Independents	300,000 CZK
Michal Filip	ANO 2011	300,000 CZK
Radim Jünger	Czech Social Democratic Party	300,000 CZK
Aleš Fuksa	Czech Pirate Party	100,000 CZK
Lubomír Nečas	Party of Civic Rights	100,000 CZK
Radomír Rafaja	Communist Party of Bohemia and Moravia	50,000 CZK

== Candidates ==
Candidate	Party	Notes
Miroslav Adámek	Mayors and Independents	Mayor of Zlín. Nominated by STAN and supported by the Civic Democratic Party, Freeholder Party of the Czech Republic and TOP 09. He was considered the front-runner.
Michaela Blahová	Christian and Democratic Union – Czechoslovak People's Party	Regional councillor who was a sole female candidate.
Michal Filip	ANO 2011	Neurosurgeon and member of regional assembly.
Aleš Fuksa	Czech Pirate Party	Journalist at Právo who was nominated by Pirates.
Tomáš Goláň	Senátor 21	Tax adviser known for his opposition to politics of Andrej Babiš and fight against financial administration. Deník Referendum chose him as the Second greatest persona of 2017. He was considered outsider in the election.
Radim Jünger	ČSSD	Surgeon and traumatologist. He was nominated by Social Democrats.
Lubomír Nečas	Party of Civic Rights	Leader of the Party of Civic Rights he was supported by Freedom and Direct Democracy.
Karel Nedbálek	Czech Sovereignty	Law and Economical adviser and teacher.
Radomír Rafaja	Communist Party of Bohemia and Moravia	Communist Party local politician from Zlín.
Zdeněk Vacek	Freedom and Direct Democracy	Member of regional assembly. He was nominated by far right SPD but his party failed to register him in time.

== Results ==
Candidate	Party	1st round		2nd round	
Tomáš Goláň	Senátor 21	3,234	18.99	5,991	53.78
Michaela Blahová	Christian and Democratic Union – Czechoslovak People's Party	4,118	24.18	5,148	46.22
Miroslav Adámek	Mayors and Independents	2,786	16.36		
Michal Filip	ANO 2011	2,211	12.98		
Aleš Fuksa	Czech Pirate Party	1,559	9.15		
Radim Jünger	Czech Social Democratic Party	1,270	7.45		
Radomír Rafaja	Communist Party of Bohemia and Moravia	896	5.26		
Lubomír Nečas	Party of Civic Rights	697	4.09		
Karel Nedbálek	Czech Sovereignty	254	1.49		
Total valid votes		17,025	99.36	11,139	99.62
Invalid votes		109	0.64	42	0.38
Total		17,134	100	11,181	100
Registered voters/turnout		107,460	15.95	107,488	10.4
Source:Czech Statistical Bureau

== Aftermath ==
Goláň thanked Blahová for a correct campaign and stated he plans to focus on taxes and opposition to privatisation of some vital resources, including water. Blahová stated she respects the result. She considered her result as a success because no candidate of KDU-ČSL advanced to the second round in previous elections.

Goláň received appointment decree on 19 June 2018. His term ended in 2020. Goláň's victory led to establishment of a new Senate Caucus called Caucus for Liberal Democracy. It consists of independent Senators. He was reelected in 2020 Senate election defeating Pavel Stodůlka with 59% of votes. He then joined the Civic Democratic Party.
