= Jana Juřenčáková =

Czech senator of Czech Parliament and mayor

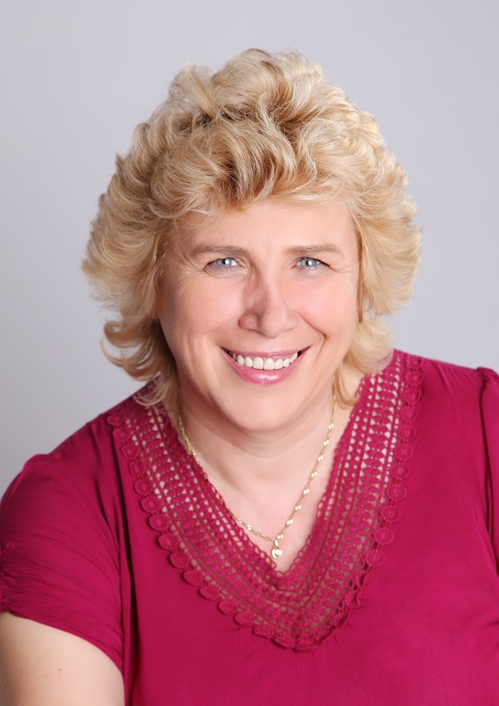

Senator from Zlín
- In office 28 October 2006 – 28 October 2012
- Preceded by: Jiří Stodůlka
- Succeeded by: Tomio Okamura

Personal details
- Born: 29 October 1962 (age 63) Slavičín, Czechoslovakia
- Party: Independent
- Education: University of Economics, Prague
- Occupation: politician, economist
- Website: www.jurencakova.cz

Jana Juřenčáková (born 29 October 1962) is a Czech politician and economist. An independent, supported by Mayors and Independents, Juřenčáková became Senator for Zlín as a result of the 2006 Czech Senate election, ahead of incumbent Jiří Stodůlka. After running for re-election in 2012, she finished fourth in the first round of voting, eventually being replaced by Tomio Okamura.
