= Kadov (Žďár nad Sázavou District) =

- Municipality
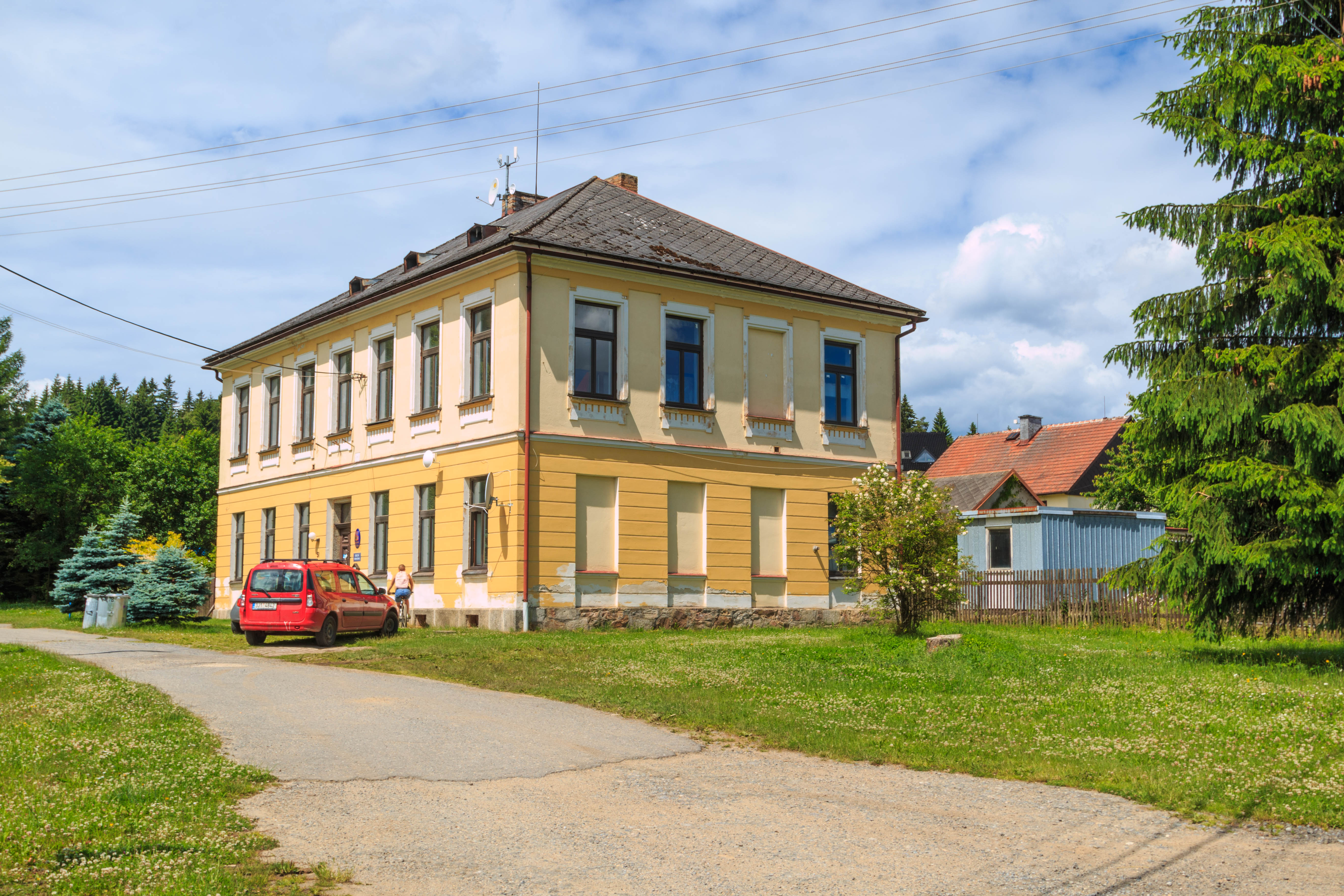
- Municipal office

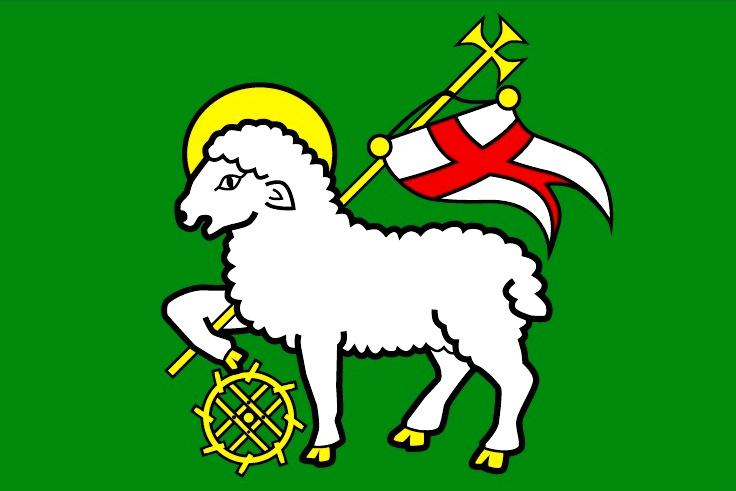
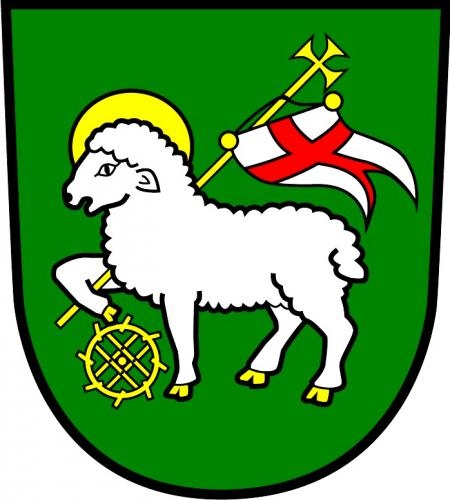
- Flag Coat of arms

- Location in the Czech Republic
- Coordinates: 49°37′57″N 16°4′45″E
- Country: Czech Republic
- Region: Vysočina
- District: Žďár nad Sázavou
- First mentioned: 1570

Area
  - Total: 5.37 km^{2} (2.07 sq mi)
- Elevation: 670 m (2,200 ft)

Population (2026-01-01)
  - Total: 149
  - Density: 27.7/km^{2} (71.9/sq mi)
- Time zone: UTC+1 (CET)
  - Summer (DST): UTC+2 (CEST)
- Postal code: 592 03
- Website: www.obeckadov.cz

Kadov is a municipality and village in Žďár nad Sázavou District in the Vysočina Region of the Czech Republic. It has about 100 inhabitants.

Kadov lies approximately 13 kilometres (8 mi) north-east of Žďár nad Sázavou, 44 km (27 mi) north-east of Jihlava, and 129 km (80 mi) south-east of Prague.

== Demographics ==
Historical population
Year	Pop.	±%
1869	431	—
1880	382	−11.4%
1890	357	−6.5%
1900	344	−3.6%
1910	379	+10.2%
1921	339	−10.6%
1930	362	+6.8%
1950	214	−40.9%
1961	170	−20.6%
1970	162	−4.7%
1980	157	−3.1%
1991	124	−21.0%
2001	126	+1.6%
2011	131	+4.0%
2021	153	+16.8%
Source: Censuses
