= Kadov (Znojmo District) =

- Municipality
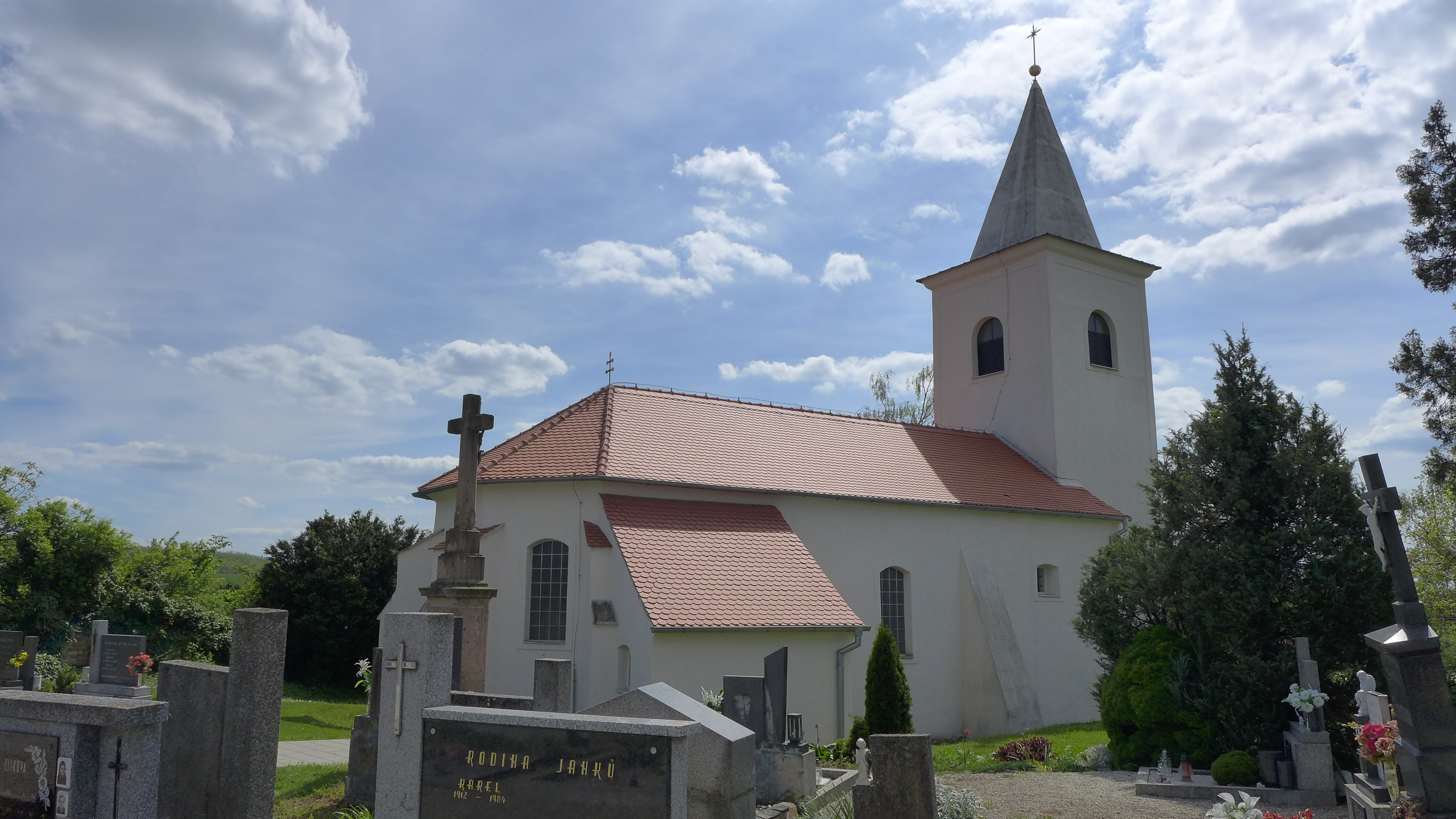
- Church of Saints Philip and James

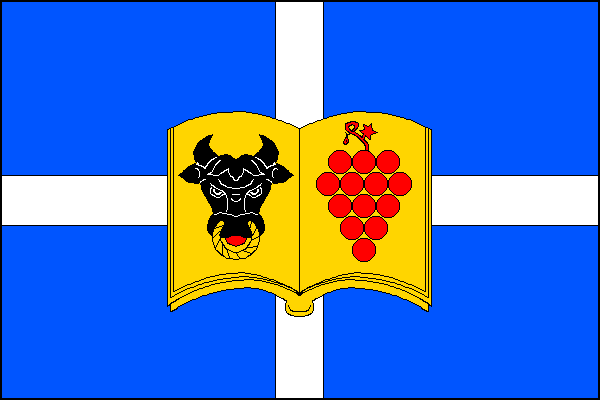
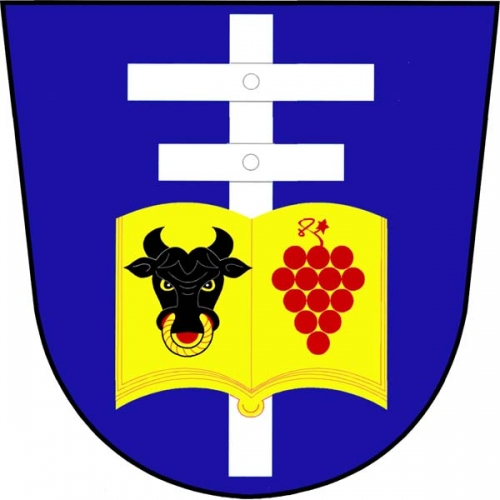
- Flag Coat of arms

- Location in the Czech Republic
- Coordinates: 48°58′58″N 16°17′14″E
- Country: Czech Republic
- Region: South Moravian
- District: Znojmo
- First mentioned: 1235

Area
  - Total: 6.18 km^{2} (2.39 sq mi)
- Elevation: 277 m (909 ft)

Population (2026-01-01)
  - Total: 144
  - Density: 23.3/km^{2} (60.3/sq mi)
- Time zone: UTC+1 (CET)
  - Summer (DST): UTC+2 (CEST)
- Postal code: 672 01
- Website: www.obec-kadov.cz

Kadov is a municipality and village in Znojmo District in the South Moravian Region of the Czech Republic. It has about 100 inhabitants.

Kadov lies approximately 24 kilometres (15 mi) north-east of Znojmo, 35 km (22 mi) south-west of Brno, and 183 km (114 mi) south-east of Prague.

== Demographics ==
Historical population
Year	Pop.	±%
1869	426	—
1880	444	+4.2%
1890	400	−9.9%
1900	377	−5.8%
1910	401	+6.4%
1921	439	+9.5%
1930	372	−15.3%
1950	301	−19.1%
1961	272	−9.6%
1970	243	−10.7%
1980	218	−10.3%
1991	171	−21.6%
2001	147	−14.0%
2011	142	−3.4%
2021	150	+5.6%
Source: Censuses
