= Pavel Pavel =

Czech engineer and archeologist

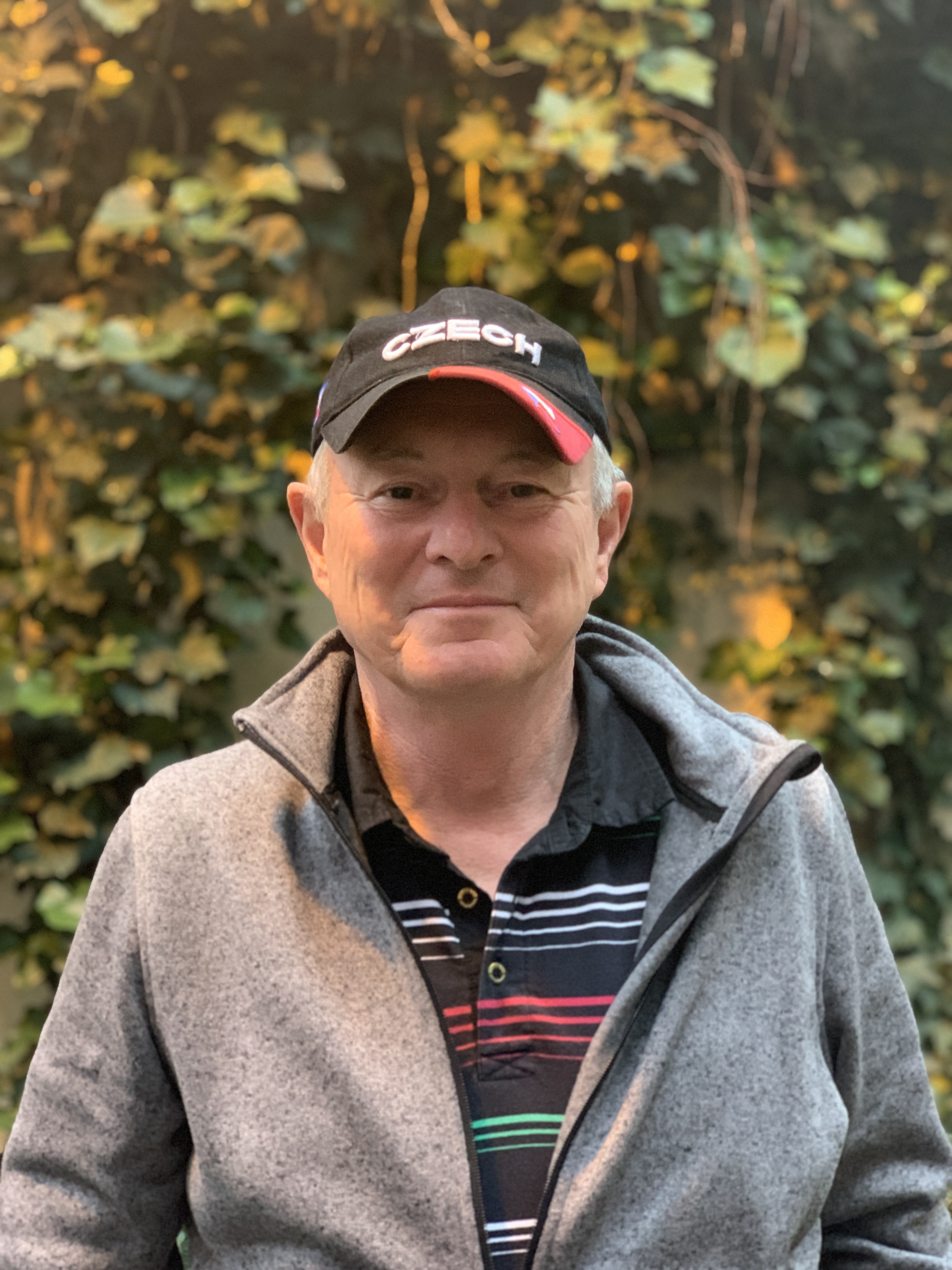
Pavel Pavel (Prague, 2020)

Pavel Pavel (born March 11, 1957, in Strakonice) is a Czech engineer and experimental archaeologist best known for investigating how ancient civilizations transported heavy weights.

Pavel Pavel studied electrical engineering at the university in Plzeň and later worked as a design engineer in Agrostav Strakonice. Solving how the ancient people could move megalithic statues and stone blocks became his hobby for which he became known. He began this line of inquiry as a child, when he became worried he may inadvertently be transported back in time and charged with moving heavy objects.

After the Velvet revolution (1989), Pavel became involved in local politics as a member of the Civic Democratic Party. He ran in two elections for the Czech Senate (in 2002 and again in 2003) finishing second. Since 1990 Pavel has worked in the field of heavy transportation, founding his company PAVEL PAVEL s.r.o. in 2000.

== Experimental archaeology ==
Inspired by Thor Heyerdahl's Kon-Tiki, Pavel Pavel set out to demonstrate how the monolithic Moai of Easter Island might have been moved into place by a small number of people using only rudimentary technologies. He conducted a practice experiment in 1982 in south Bohemia using a concrete model (4.5 m, 12 tonnes). In 1986, he was invited by Heyerdahl to Easter Island to test his experiment in its actual setting, where he successfully replicated the experiment. Only 16 people with one leader were needed for relatively fast statue transportation.

He then performed some further experiments. He and five assistants using only wooden sledges erected and moved a 30-ton rocking stone at the village of Kadov (in Strakonice District) to its original location, from where it had been removed in the 19th century by unknown vandals. He estimated that only 160 people with similar simple technology would have been necessary for transportation of the 800 ton stones in Baalbek.

One of next experiments, realised 1991, was building of one segment of Stonehenge model 1:1. Ten people transported during one day a five-ton concrete stone to the top of other two stones, using only ropes and wooden sledges. This model is erected in Strakonice.

== Books ==
- Pavel Pavel: Rapa Nui, České Budějovice, 1988.
- Jaroslav Malina, Pavel Pavel: Jak vznikly největší monumenty dávnověku (How the largest ancient monuments had been built), Prague 1994, ISBN 80-205-0211-4.
- Rapa Nui, The Man Who Made the Moai Walk, first edition, Rapanui Press 2014, Chili. ISBN 978-956-9337-06-2. www.rapanuipress.com
