= Irena Ondrová =

Czech politician (1949–2021)

Senator from Zlín
- In office 23 November 1996 – 23 November 2002
- Succeeded by: Alena Gajdůšková

Personal details
- Born: 19 June 1949 Chomutov, Czechoslovakia
- Died: 5 June 2021 (aged 71)
- Party: Civic Democratic Party
- Education: Charles University

Irena Ondrová (19 June 1949 – 5 June 2021) was a Czech politician who was a Senator from Zlín 1 from 1996 to 2002 representing the Civic Democratic Party (ODS). She also served as mayor of Zlín from 2006 to 2010.

== Background, education and personal life ==
Until 1994, Ondrová worked in Zlín kindergartens as a teacher, in the last one of which she became a principal. In 2003, she completed her studies in culturology at the Faculty of Arts of Charles University.

== Political career ==
Ondrová joined the ODS in 1992. From 1994 to 1998 and 2002 to 2006, she served as Deputy Mayor of Zlín for Education, Culture and Social Affairs, and she served as Mayor from 2006 to 2010.

In the 1996 elections, Ondrová became a member of the Senate, the upper house of the Czech parliament when she defeated KDU-ČSL candidate Jaromír Schneider in both rounds. She served on the Senate as Vice-Chair of the Committee on Petitions, Human Rights, Science, Education and Culture from 1996 to 1998 and 2000 to 2002, which she chaired from 1998 to 2000. Ondrová defended her mandate in the 2002 election, and although she won the first round with 30.36% of the vote, she received 42.97% of the vote in the second round and was not elected.

Ondrová had been a member of the Rada pro rozhlasové a televizní vysílání since 2003; her term expired in July 2015.
