= Tomáš Goláň =

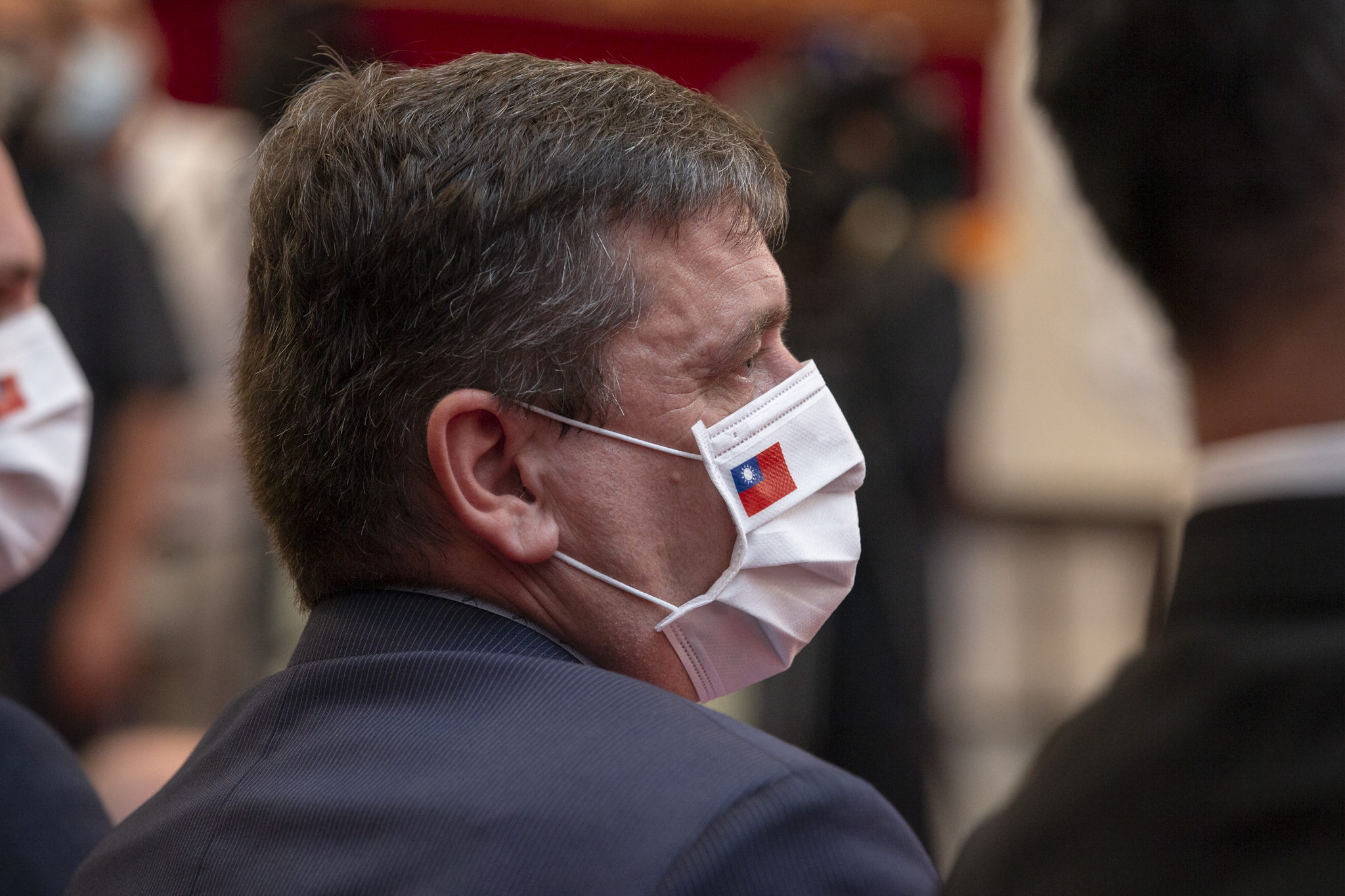
- Tomáš Goláň

Senator from Zlín
- Incumbent
- Assumed office 26 May 2018
- Preceded by: František Čuba

Personal details
- Born: 1 February 1968 (age 58) Vsetín, Czechoslovakia (now Czech Republic)
- Party: ODS (since 2020); Independent for Senátor 21 (2018–2020)
- Education: Mendel University
- Website: http://www.tomasgolan.cz

Tomáš Goláň (born 1 December 1968) is a Czech tax adviser. He was elected member of Senate during 2018 by-election for Zlín seat and reelected during 2020 Czech Senate election.

== Biography ==
He studied at the Faculty of Business and Economics of Mendel University. He worked as an economist at Zlín until 1993 when he became tax advisor.

He became widely known for his fight against preliminary injunctions by financial administration. He received an award from Deník Referendum which chose him as the second most important person of 2017.

== Political career ==
On 22 March 2018, he announced his candidacy in a by-election for Zlín seat in 2018. Goláň was nominated by Senátor 21. Goláň was initially viewed as an underdog in the election but managed to advance to runoff where he faced Michaela Blahová. He defeated Blahová when he received over 53% of votes and became new senator. He then joined newly formed Senate group of Senátor 21. Shortly after Goláň's reelection in 2020 he joined Civic Democratic Party and its Senate group (ODS+TOP09 Senate group).
