= Kadov (Strakonice District) =

- Municipality
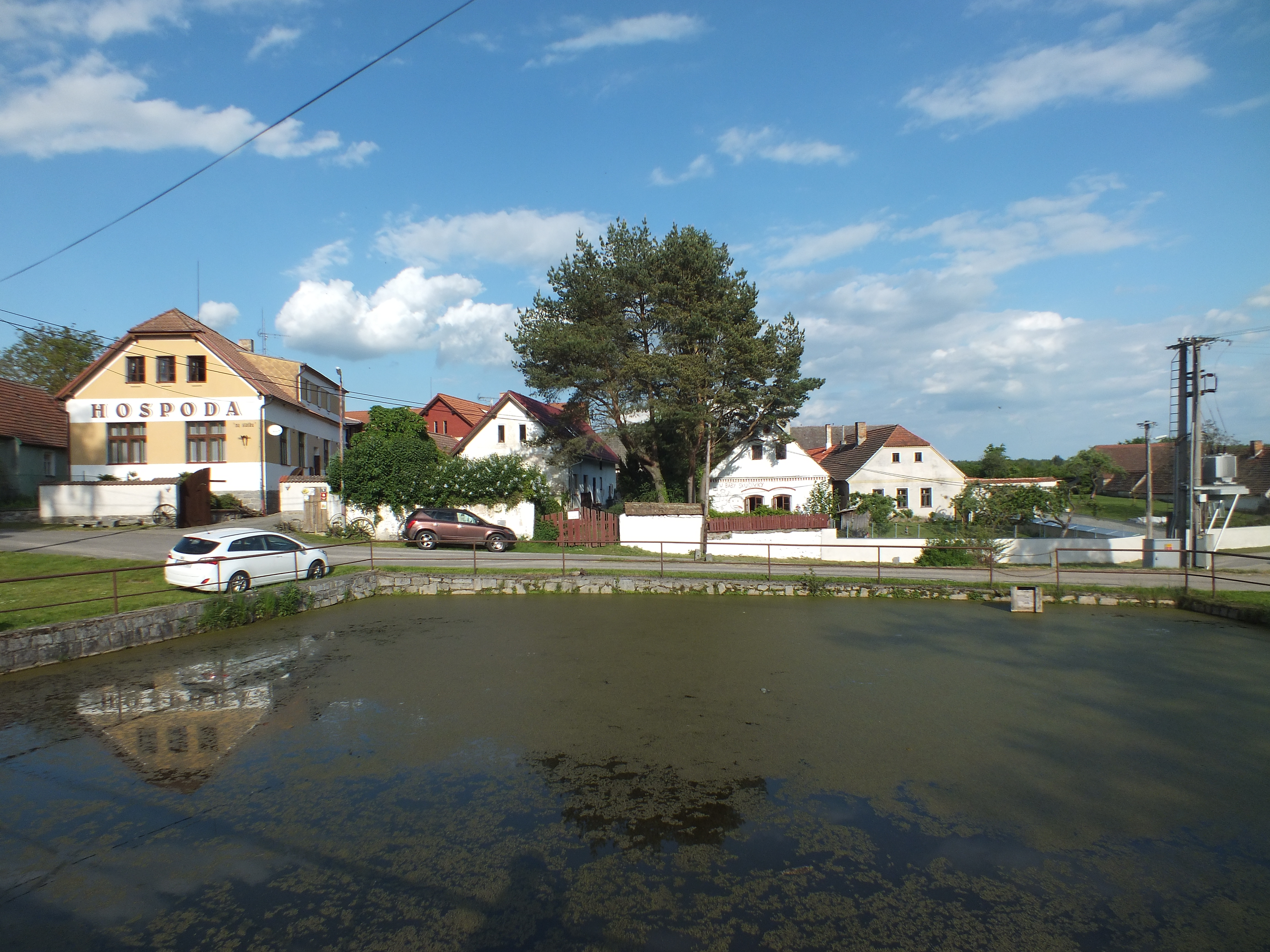
- Pole, a part of Kadov

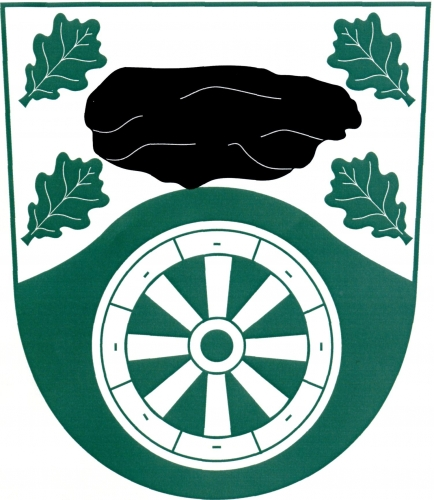
- Flag Coat of arms

- Location in the Czech Republic
- Coordinates: 49°24′10″N 13°46′29″E
- Country: Czech Republic
- Region: South Bohemian
- District: Strakonice
- First mentioned: 1352

Area
  - Total: 19.61 km^{2} (7.57 sq mi)
- Elevation: 510 m (1,670 ft)

Population (2026-01-01)
  - Total: 388
  - Density: 19.8/km^{2} (51.2/sq mi)
- Time zone: UTC+1 (CET)
  - Summer (DST): UTC+2 (CEST)
- Postal codes: 387 33, 388 01
- Website: www.kadov.net

Kadov is a municipality and village in Strakonice District in the South Bohemian Region of the Czech Republic. It has about 400 inhabitants.

Kadov lies approximately 18 kilometres (11 mi) north-west of Strakonice, 70 km (43 mi) north-west of České Budějovice, and 89 km (55 mi) south-west of Prague.

== Administrative division ==
Kadov consists of five municipal parts (in brackets population according to the 2021 census):

- Kadov (116)
- Lnářský Málkov (79)
- Mračov (14)
- Pole (76)
- Vrbno (90)

== Demographics ==
Historical population
Year	Pop.	±%
1869	1,364	—
1880	1,383	+1.4%
1890	1,301	−5.9%
1900	1,190	−8.5%
1910	1,238	+4.0%
1921	1,238	+0.0%
1930	1,094	−11.6%
1950	800	−26.9%
1961	757	−5.4%
1970	634	−16.2%
1980	544	−14.2%
1991	472	−13.2%
2001	401	−15.0%
2011	360	−10.2%
2021	375	+4.2%
Source: Censuses
