= Lubomír Ledl =

Czech politician (1952–2021)

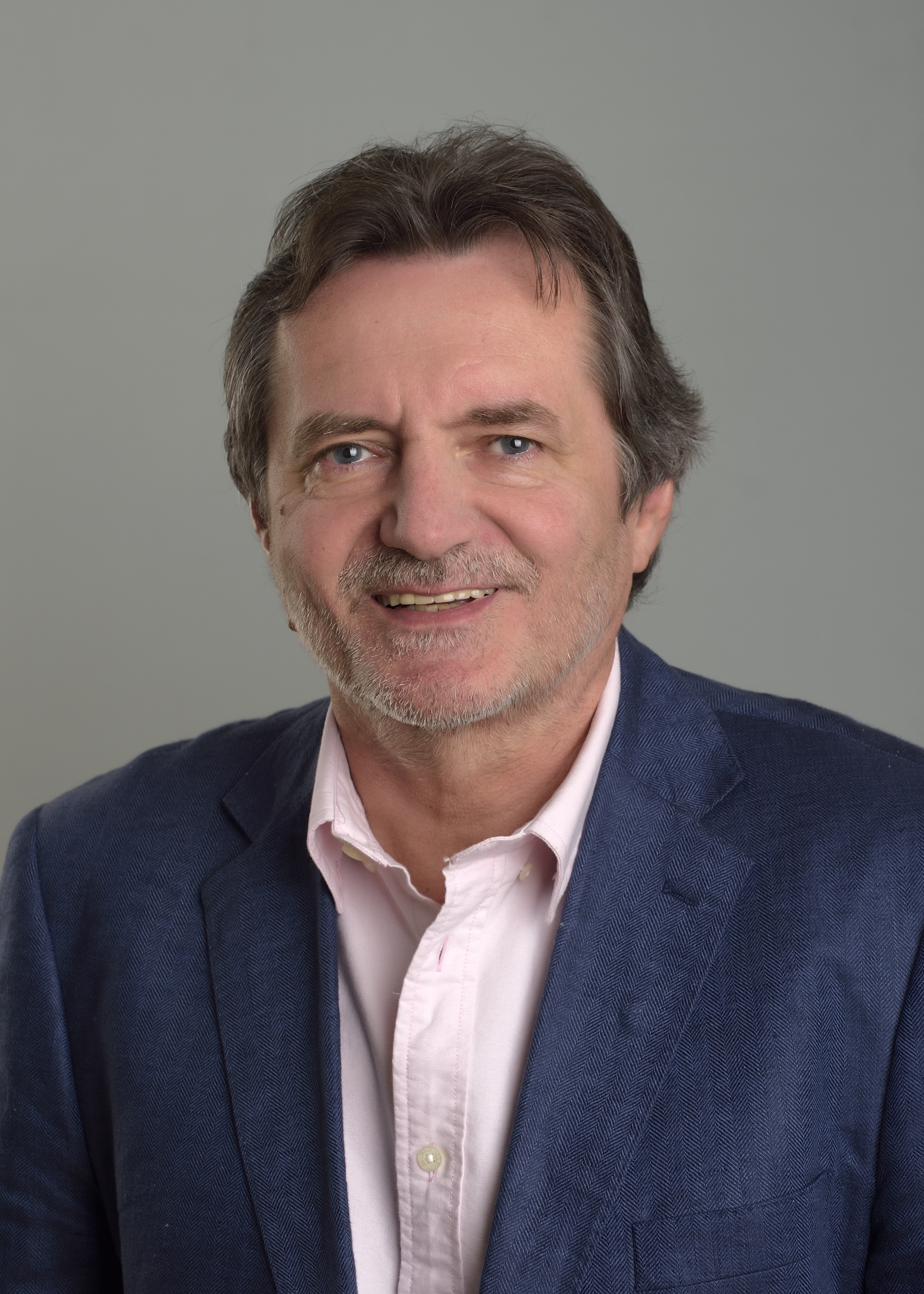
Lubomir Ledl

Lubomír Ledl (23 July 1952 – 20 May 2021) was a Czech politician who served as a member of the Federal Assembly of Czechoslovakia.
