= Josef Kalbáč =

Czech politician (1940–2026)

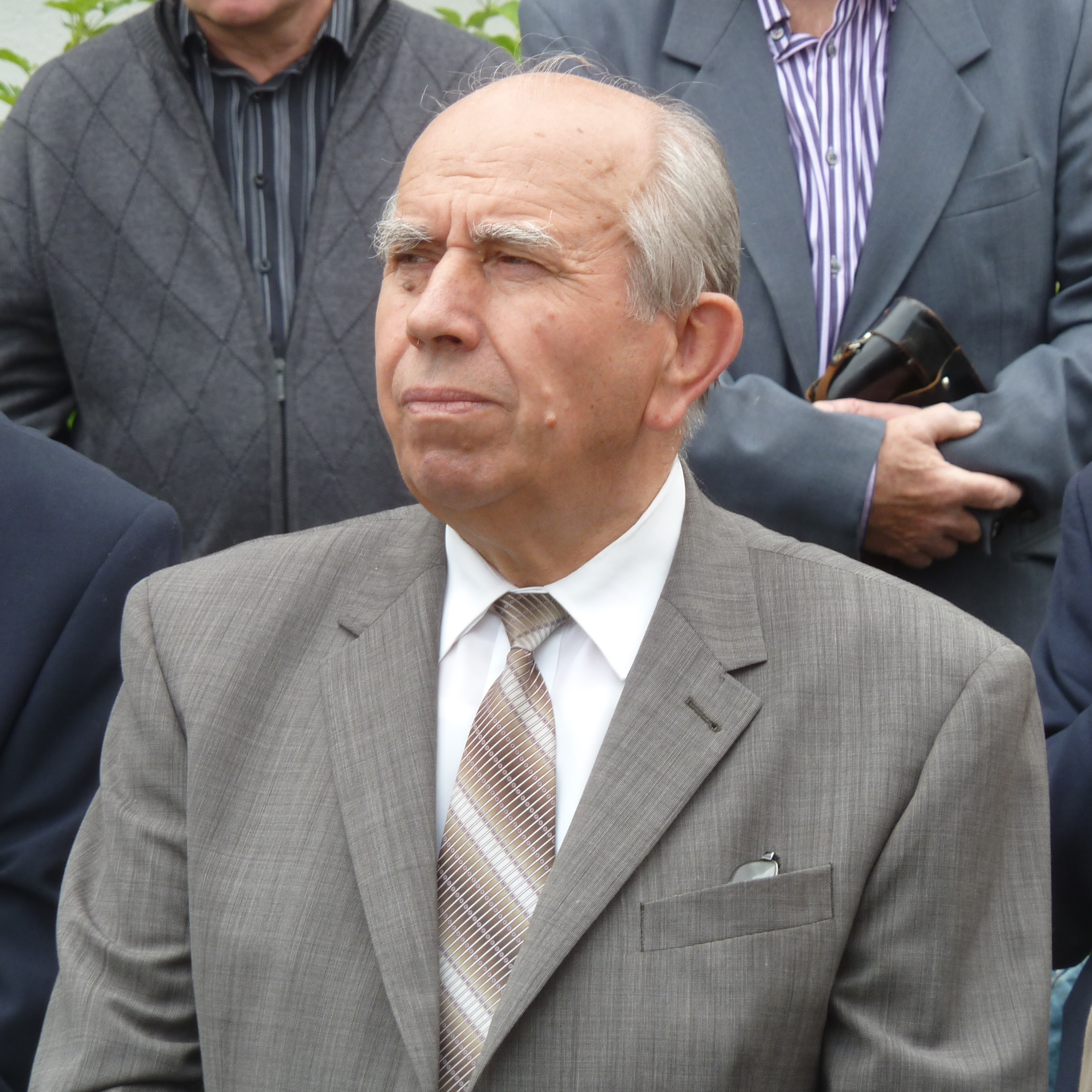
- Kalbáč in 2011

Member of the Senate of the Czech Republic for Strakonice
- In office 1 November 2003 – 2 November 2008
- Preceded by: Pavel Rychetský
- Succeeded by: Miroslav Krejča

Personal details
- Born: 17 February 1940 Třebohostice, Protectorate of Bohemia and Moravia
- Died: 21 September 2026 (aged 86)
- Party: KDU-ČSL
- Education: Czech University of Life Sciences Prague
- Occupation: Agronomer

Josef Kalbáč (17 February 1940 – 21 September 2026) was a Czech agronomer and politician. A member of KDU-ČSL, he served in the Senate from 2003 to 2008.

Kalbáč died on 21 September 2026, at the age of 86.
