= Constitutional Court of the Czech Republic =

Czech constitutional court

Coordinates: 49°11′52″N 16°36′16″E

- Ústavní soud České republiky
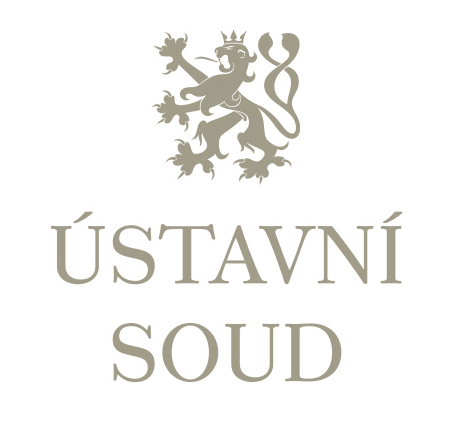
- Established: 1 January 1993
- Location: Brno, Czech Republic
- Composition method: Presidential nomination with Senate confirmation
- Authorised by: Constitution of the Czech Republic
- Judge term length: 10 years, renewable
- Number of positions: 15
- Website: https://www.usoud.cz/

President
- Currently: Josef Baxa
- Since: 7 August 2023

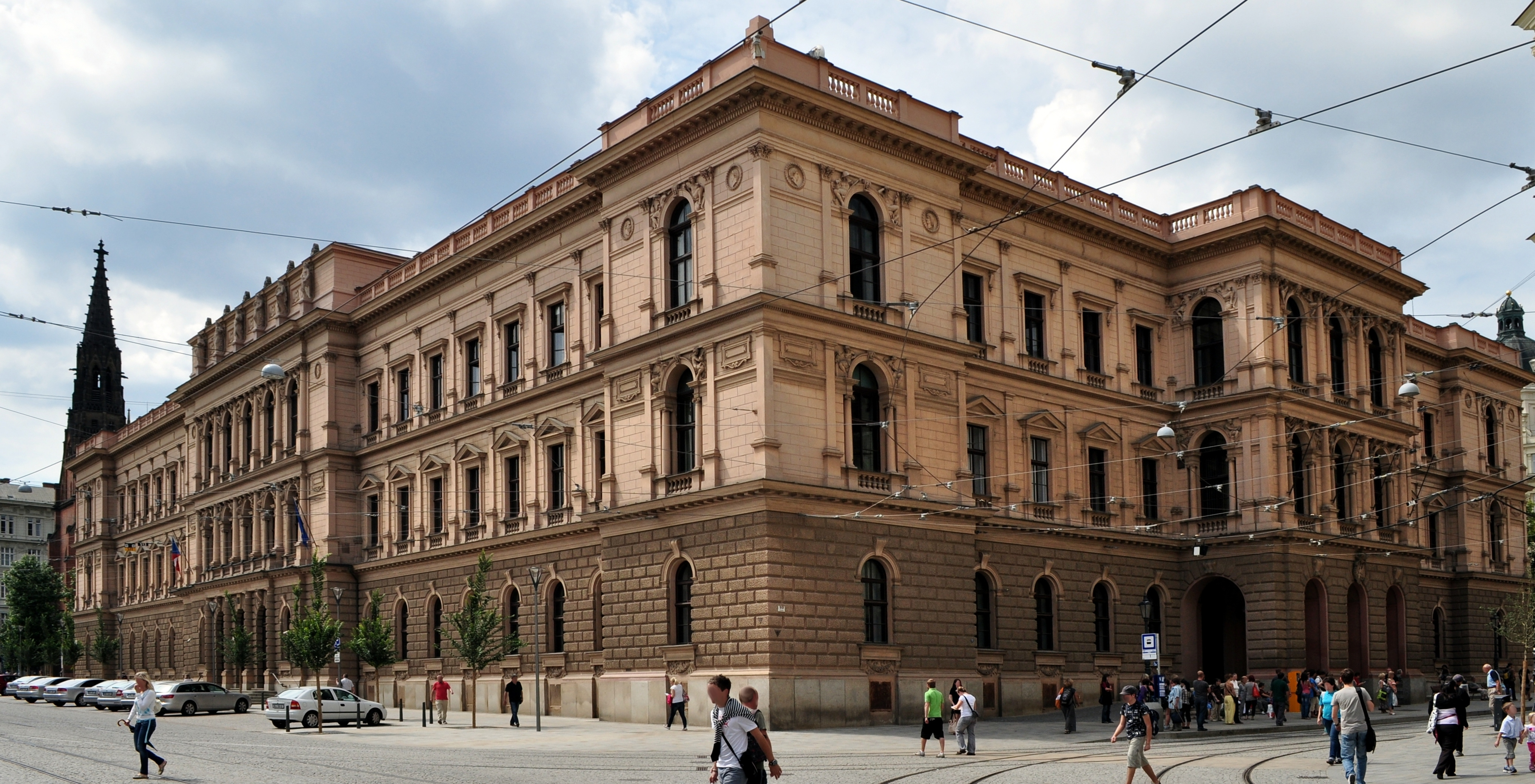
Seat of the Court in Brno.

The Constitutional Court of the Czech Republic (Czech: Ústavní soud České republiky) is the constitutional court in the Czech Republic and the de facto highest and most powerful court in the land.

It has its basis in the Constitution and it is the one created with the greatest specificity among all levels of judiciary. The Constitution states that the Court is "charged with protection of constitutional rule" and as such its primary and appellate jurisdiction is to review and rule on questions of constitutionality and constitutional law. It is also the only venue for impeachment proceedings brought by the Parliament against the president. The Court has the power of judicial review which allows it to invalidate and strike down laws enacted by the Parliament.

The decisions of the Court are final, cannot be overturned except by amending the constitution, and are considered a source of law, similar to precedents in a common law system.

Although the Court itself was established only in 1993, its Czechoslovak predecessor was already provided for in the Constitution of 1920, making Czechoslovakia the first country in the world with a system of judicial review by a specialized court (although the court itself first convened after the Austrian one). It was later adopted by many other countries.

== History and predecessors ==
=== 1848–1918 ===
The development of the Czech constitutional tradition went initially hand in hand with that in Austria-Hungary, to which the Czech Crown lands belonged between 1806–1918. The first attempts to establish a system based on constitution were connected with the 1848 Revolution. A number of constitutions were enacted during the Austrian period (April 1848, March 1849, February 1861 all enacted by the king, December 1867 enacted by the Parliament), however these were far from being democratic and did not include the possibility of judicial review of the acts of the Parliament nor the Habsburg sovereigns. Although the attempt to democratize the Habsburg monarchy failed at the time, it marked the beginning of Czech political activization which ultimately brought about personalities such as Karel Kramář or Tomáš Masaryk, who later took part in the establishment of the First Czechoslovak Republic and its constitutional tradition.

=== 1918–1948 ===
Following the establishment of Czechoslovakia, the Interim Constitution was passed in November 1918 (Act No. 37/1918 Coll.), which did not yet establish the Constitutional court.

Meanwhile, the works on the Czechoslovak constitution were at full pace. The new constitution was influenced by the following models:

- 1867 Austrian constitution in the sphere of civil rights,
- 1787 constitution of the USA in the sphere of judiciary and checks and balances,
- 1875 French constitution in the sphere of the powers of the president and the parliament,
- the Swiss constitution in the sphere of the powers of the government.

The new constitution was further influenced by the Czech humanist tradition (Jan Hus, Petr Chelčický, Jan Amos Komenský, František Palacký, František Rieger, Tomáš Masaryk) as well as the peace conferences which took place after the first world war.

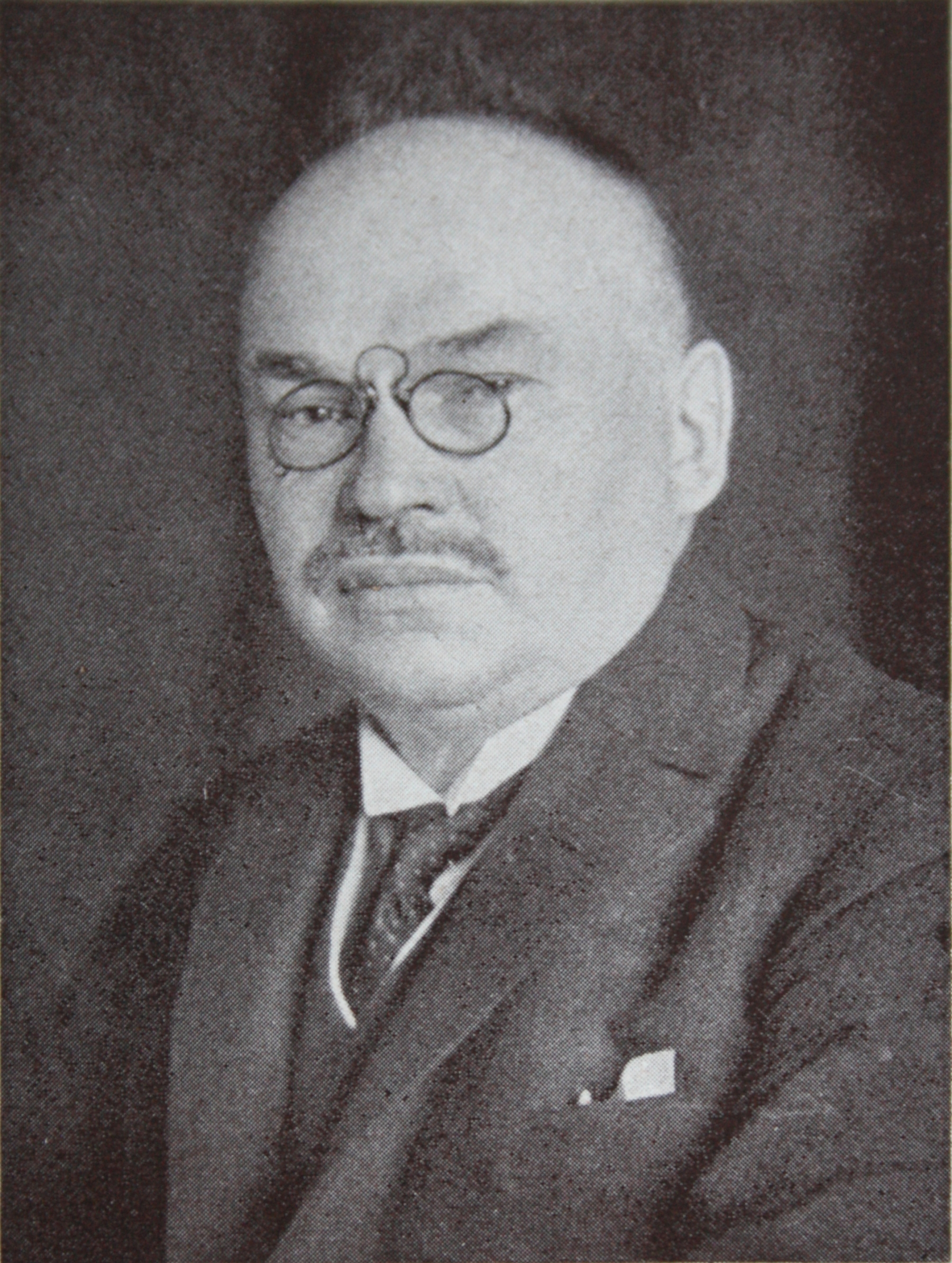
Karel Baxa, Chief Justice 1921-1931

The new constitution was accepted on 2 February 1920 as Act No. 121/1920 Coll. With this constitution Czechoslovakia became the first country in the world to adopt a system where a review of acts of the national parliament's constitutionality was possible by a special court - the Constitutional Court (while in USA and Australia this power was vested in the hands of their Supreme Courts already before and the Austrian Constitutional Court already had the power to examine laws of the States of Austria in 1919). Later, a similar system of judicial review on national level was adopted by Austria (1920) which came into force before the Czechoslovak Constitutional Court took up its duties. It later became generally known as the Austrian System, being taken over by many other countries e.g. Liechtenstein (1925), Greece (1927), Spain (1931), Germany (1949) etc. The Constitutional Court of Czechoslovakia itself came into existence in the assembly hall of the presidium of the Council of Ministers at Prague Castle on 17 November 1921.

The Constitutional Court had the jurisdiction to decide about constitutionality of the enactments of the Republic, of Assembly of the Carpathian Ruthenia (this was only theoretical, as the presumption of its autonomy was not reached until 1938) and of legal measures of Permanent Committee (which consisted of 16 members of the Chamber of the Deputies and 8 Senators and took action in urgent cases when the Parliament was not in session). The motions for review of enactments could be brought by the Supreme Court, Supreme Administrative Court, Chamber of Deputies, Senate and the Assembly of the Carpathian Ruthenia, while the legal measures of the Permanent Committee were subject to automatic review immediately after being passed. Unlike today, the Court did not have the jurisdiction to hear citizens' individual petitions.

The Court was active in the period of 1921–1931, when it reviewed a number of legal measures of the Permanent Committee, however no motions for review of enactments were ever brought before it. Although the legal basis for the Court and its jurisdiction remained unchanged, it was vacant and inactive between 1932–1937. The Chief Justice for the period of 1938-1939 was Jaroslav Krejčí.

Although the Constitution remained in force during the German Nazi occupation and after the war, the rights it was providing for became only theoretical and the Constitutional Court was not convened during or after the second world war.

=== 1948–1989 ===
Due to extermination of a large number of Czechoslovak elites by the Nazi Germans, disillusion with the Western countries following the Munich Agreement and high influence of the Soviet Union, which liberated almost whole of the country, the post-war era may be characterized by the growing influence of the communists, which culminated in February 1948 Communist coup. A new constitution was adopted in May 1948. It was essentially a 1920 constitution modified by socialist ideas in order to serve the ideology of the communist party. For example, the list of fundamental rights was extended to cover also social and cultural rights, but the actual implementation of these rights was left out of the constitution and the right of a private ownership was limited. Formally, the constitution was democratic and influenced by the idea of "People's Democracy". In reality, however, democracy was curbed with the communist party controlling the state and the fundamental rights not being observed by the authorities.

The 1948 constitution did not adopt the Constitutional Court, instead giving the Presidium of the National Assembly the powers of both the Constitutional Court and the Supreme Administrative Court.

Another constitution was adopted in 1960, being influenced mostly by the Soviet constitution of 1936. It legally established the "leading role" of the communist party, declared Marxism-Leninism as the state's leading ideology, and abandoned the separation of powers. This constitution was to a large degree modified in 1968, establishing Czech and Slovak Socialist Republics within the Czechoslovakia as a federative socialist state. The 1968 constitution re-introduced the Constitutional Court, or in fact three of them - one for the Federation and two for the Republics. The Federal Constitutional Court was to have a jurisdiction over constitutionality of federal enactments and disputes over competencies between the Federation and the Republics. The Constitution anticipated adoption of an enactment dealing in detail with Constitutional Court, but that did not happen until 1991, precluding the factual establishment of the Court. Officially the need for the Court had not arisen as the presumed disputes over competencies between the Federation and the Republics never took place.

=== 1989–1992 ===
The first changes to the Constitution took place already during the Velvet Revolution. On 30 November 1989, the leading role of the communist party was abolished as well as mentioning of the Marxism-Leninism. A number of other novelizations led to democratization of the constitution. In 1991 the Charter of Fundamental Rights was adopted as a part of the Constitutional order, which was followed by an implementing enactment dealing with the Constitutional Court, as presumed by the 1968 constitution.

The Constitutional Court of Czechoslovakia was thus re-established, although only for a brief period of time in 1992 before the dissolution of Czechoslovakia. The dissolution itself was actually carried out by a constitutional act (No. 542/1992 Coll.).

=== Since 1992 ===
On 16 December 1992 a new Constitution (Act No. 1/1993 Coll.) and the Charter of Fundamental Rights and Basic Freedoms (Act No. 2/1993 Coll.) were adopted. Article 83-89 of the Constitution established the Constitutional Court of the Czech Republic, the processes of which are further elaborated in Act No. 182/1993 Coll..

== Jurisdiction ==
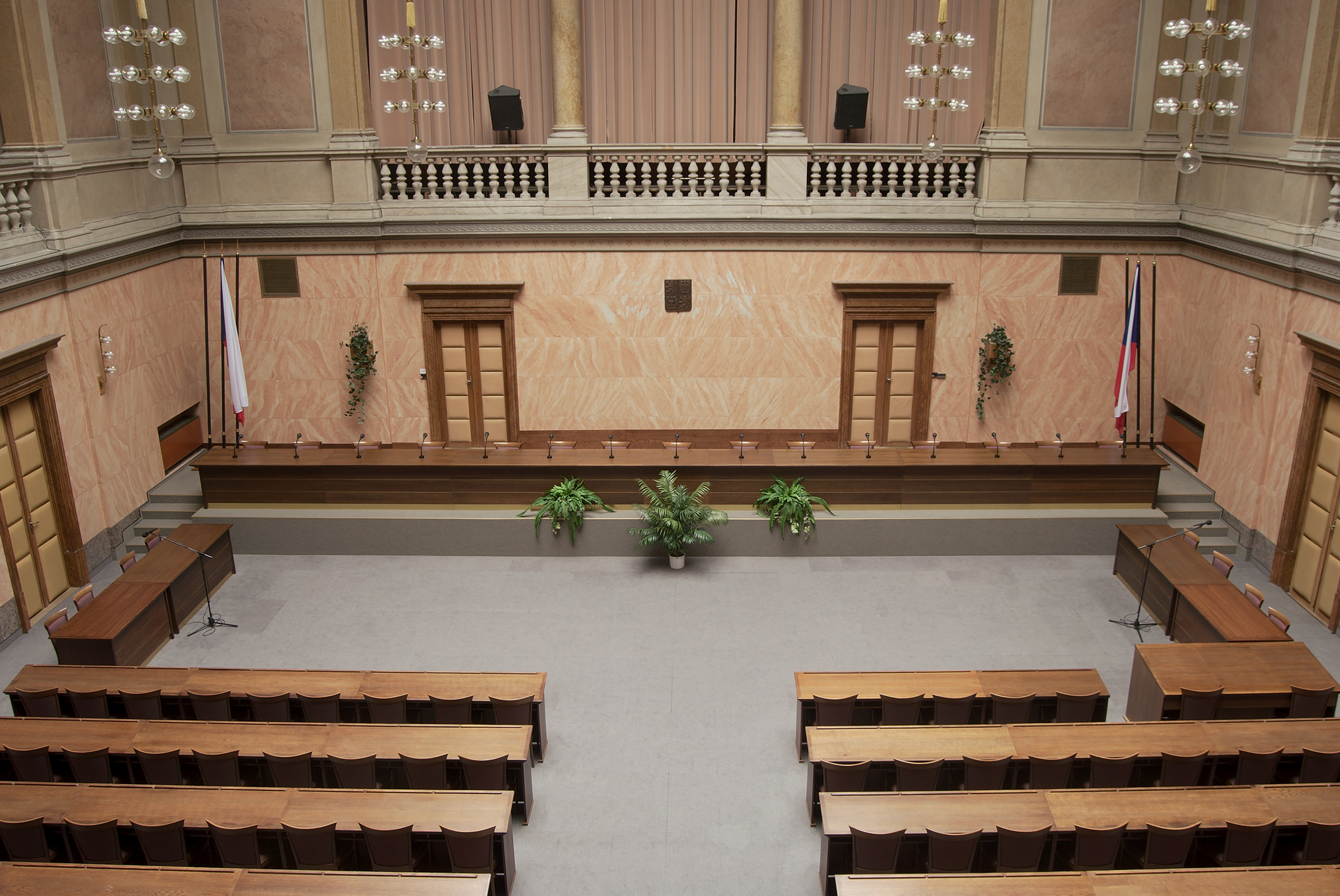
Hall for plenary sessions (formerly hall of the Moravian Parliament)

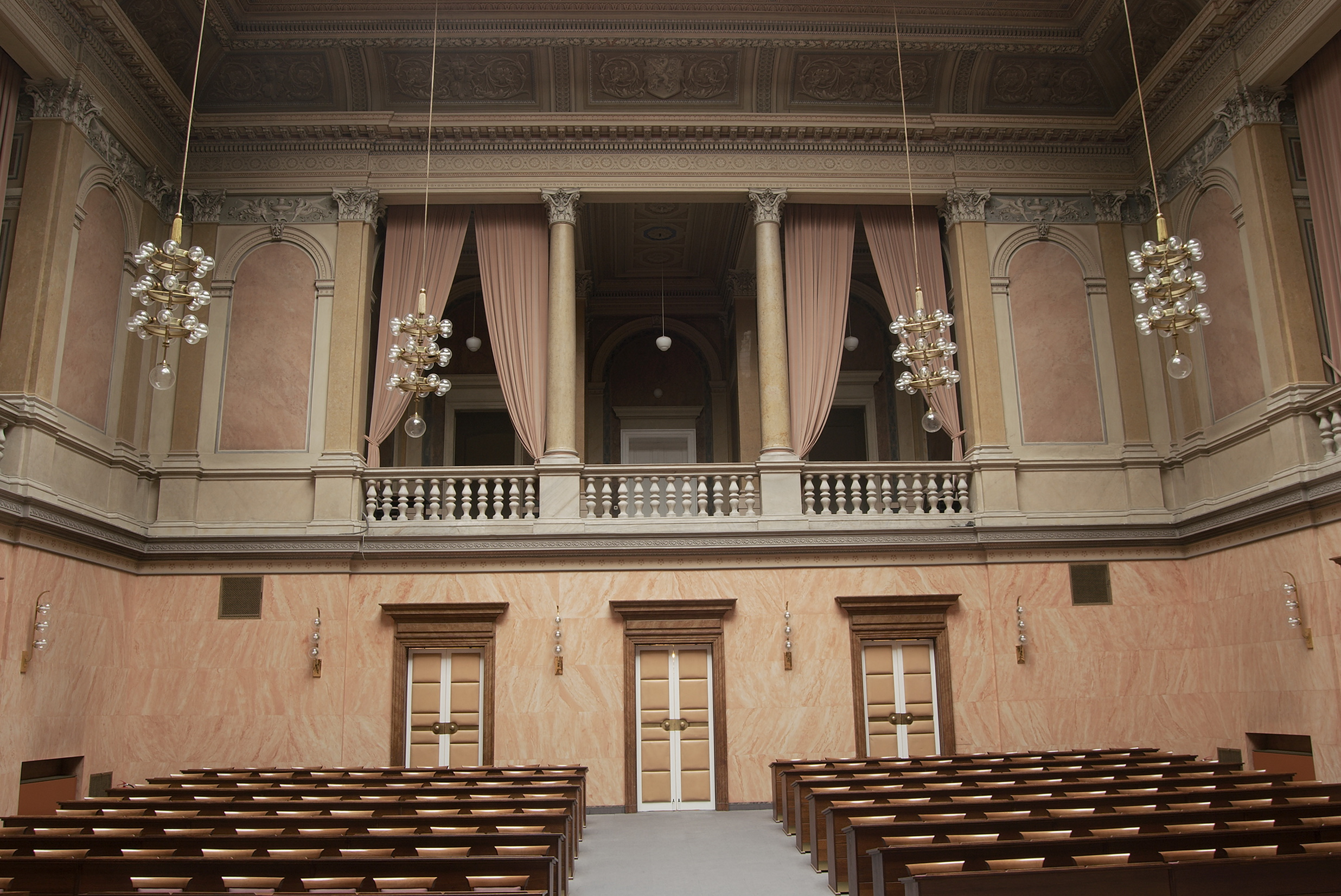

The major part of the court's workload consists of individual petitions of citizen's alleged violations of their constitutional rights after all other remedies were exhausted (including appeals to the Supreme Court or the Supreme Administrative Court).

According to Article 87 of the Constitution, the Constitutional Court shall rule on:

- repeal of laws or individual provisions thereof should they contravene the constitutional order,
- repeal of other legal regulations or individual provisions thereof should they contravene the constitutional order or the law,
- constitutional complaints filed by territorial self-government bodies against illegal interventions by the State,
- constitutional complaints filed against final decisions and other interventions by agencies of public authority, violating constitutionally guaranteed fundamental rights and freedoms,
- appeals against decisions in matters of confirmation of the election of a Deputy or Senator,
- reservations on loss of eligibility and on incompatibility of holding the office of Deputy or Senator according to Article 25,
- impeachment by the Senate of the President of the Republic under Article 65, par. 2,
- the Presidential proposal to repeal a decision of the Chamber of Deputies and the Senate according to Article 66 (decision on execution of selected presidential duties being handed over to the Prime Minister in case of President's inability to execute them himself for a serious reason),
- measures essential for the implementation of a ruling by an international court, which is binding for the Czech Republic, unless it can be implemented in a different manner,
- whether a decision on the dissolution of a political party, or another decision regarding the activity of a political party, conforms to constitutional or other laws,
- disputes regarding the scope of the jurisdiction of state agencies and territorial self-government agencies, unless such disputes are under the jurisdiction of a different body,
- on the remedy against a decision adopted by the President of the Republic not to announce a referendum concerning the accession of the Czech Republic to the European Union, on whether the procedure of the referendum concerning the accession of the Czech Republic to the European Union is in accordance with the Constitutional Act on Referendum concerning the Accession of the Czech Republic to the European Union and the implementing regulation related thereto.

Also, in cases when an already abolished law contrary to the constitutional order should be applied by a general court, it shall submit the issue to the Constitutional Court (Art. 95 par. 2).

== Composition ==
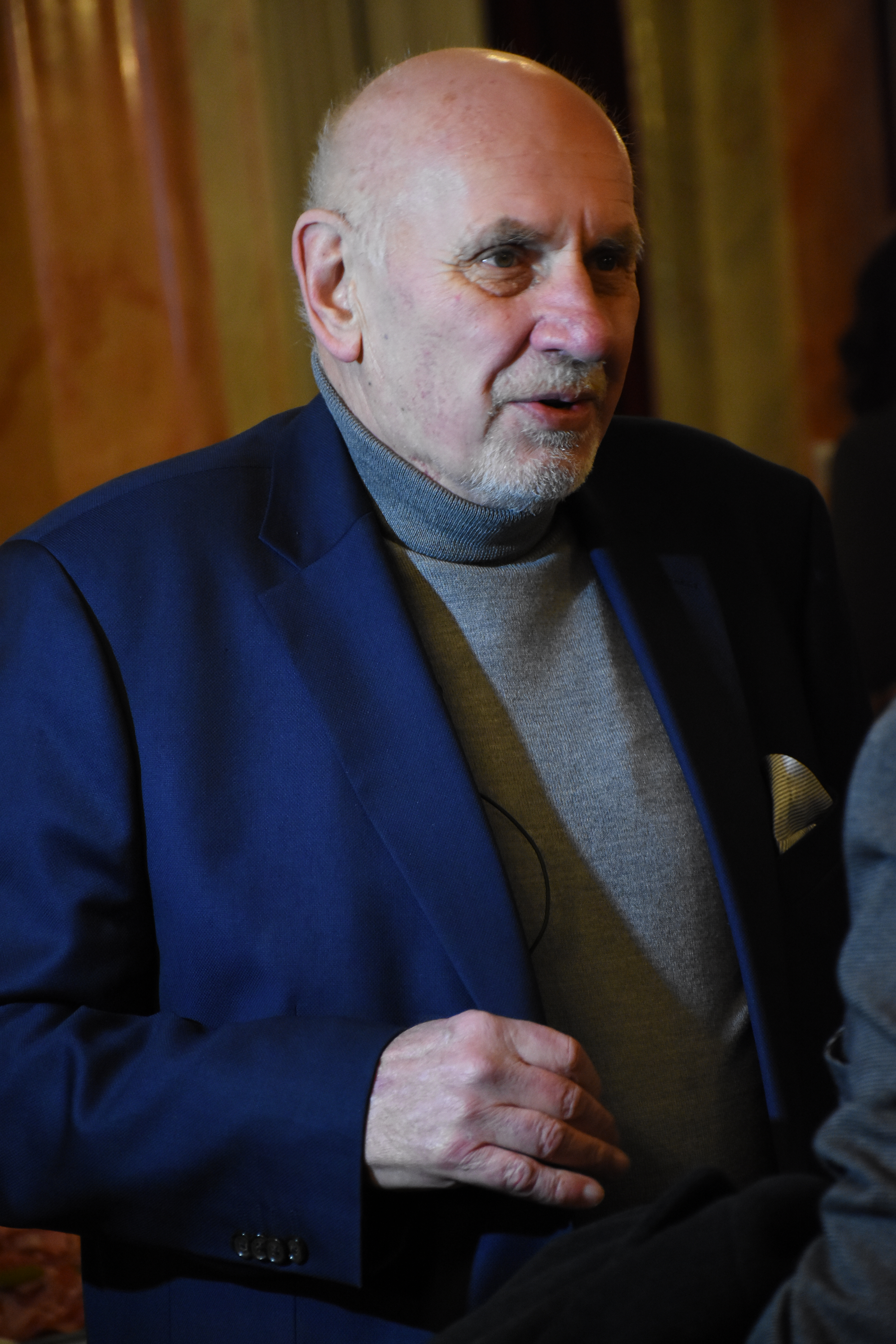
Pavel Rychetský had been the President of the Court for 20 years

The Court is composed of 15 justices who are named for a renewable period of 10 years by the President subject to the Senate's approval. The justices enjoy criminal immunity and may be prosecuted only subject to the approval of the Senate.

The plenum of the court is quorate when at least 10 justices are present. A majority of at least 9 justices must be reached in order to repeal a law, to impeach the President or to adopt a legal opinion differentiating from one previously held. Other matters are decided by senates consisting of three justices.

The present composition of the court includes the following justices:

Justices and senates in 2024
| President | Josef Baxa |
| Vice President | Vojtěch Šimíček |
| Vice President | Kateřina Ronovská |
| First Senate | Jan Wintr |
| First Senate | Jaromír Jirsa |
| First Senate | Veronika Křesťanová |
| Second Senate | Jan Svatoň |
| Second Senate | David Uhlíř |
| Second Senate | Pavel Šámal |
| Third Senate | Daniela Zemanová |
| Third Senate | Tomáš Lichovník |
| Third Senate | Lucie Dolanská Bányaiová |
| Fourth Senate | Josef Fiala |
| Fourth Senate | Milan Hulmák |
| Fourth Senate | Zdeněk Kühn |

=== Presidents ===
- Zdeněk Kessler (15 July 1993 – 12 February 2003)
- Miloš Holeček (17 March 2003 – 15 July 2003)
- Pavel Rychetský (6 August 2003 – 7 August 2023)
- Josef Baxa (since 8 August 2023)

== See also ==
- Judiciary
- Rule of law
- Rule according to higher law
