= Drtina =

Drtina (Czech pronunciation: [ˈdr̩cɪna]; feminine: Drtinová) is a Czech surname. The word drtina means 'particle of sawdust'. It may be, e.g., a nickname for a very small person. Notable people with the surname include:

- Daniela Drtinová (born 1970), Czech TV presenter and journalist
- Jiří Drtina (born 1985), Czech ice hockey player
- Marek Drtina (born 1989), Czech ice hockey player
