= Miloš Zeman =

President of the Czech Republic from 2013 to 2023

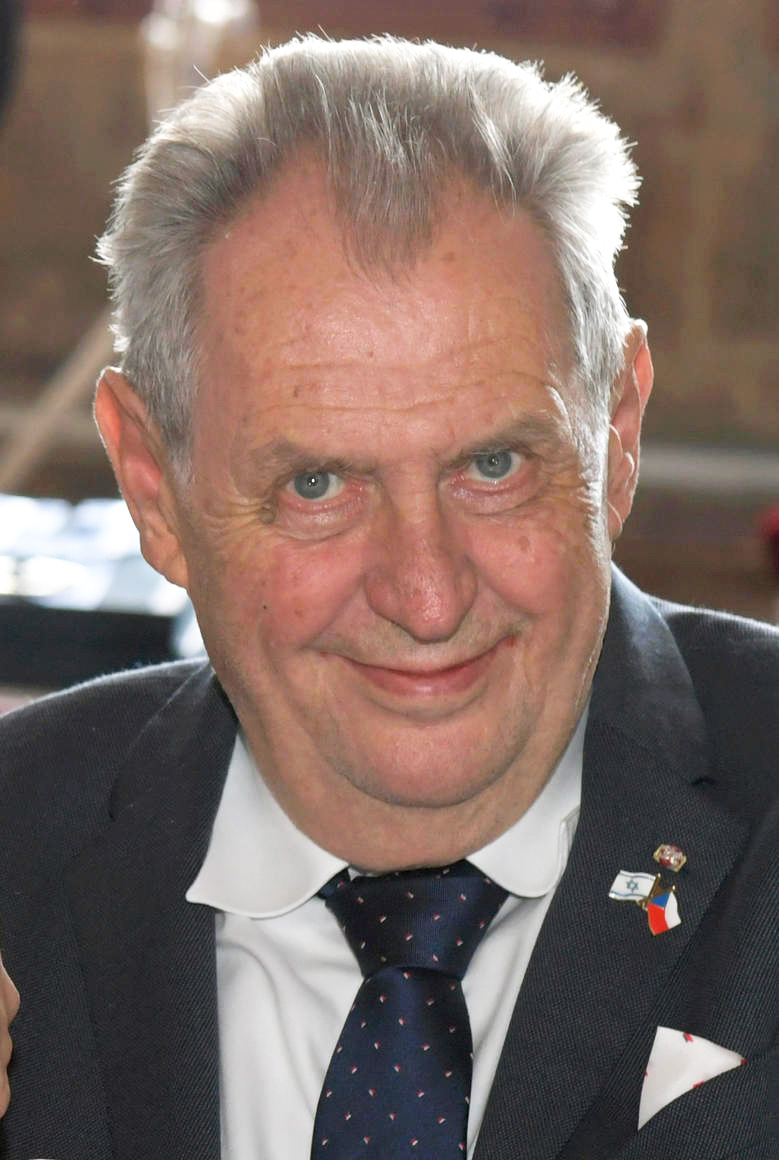
- Zeman in 2022

3rd President of the Czech Republic
- In office 8 March 2013 – 8 March 2023
- Prime Minister: Petr Nečas; Jiří Rusnok; Bohuslav Sobotka; Andrej Babiš; Petr Fiala
- Preceded by: Václav Klaus
- Succeeded by: Petr Pavel

Prime Minister of the Czech Republic
- In office 17 July 1998 – 12 July 2002
- President: Václav Havel
- Preceded by: Josef Tošovský
- Succeeded by: Vladimír Špidla

President of the Chamber of Deputies
- In office 27 June 1996 – 17 July 1998
- Preceded by: Milan Uhde
- Succeeded by: Václav Klaus

Leader of the Social Democratic Party
- In office 28 February 1993 – 7 April 2001
- Preceded by: Jiří Horák
- Succeeded by: Vladimír Špidla

Member of the Chamber of Deputies
- In office 1 June 1996 – 20 June 2002

Personal details
- Born: 28 September 1944 (age 82) Kolín, Protectorate of Bohemia and Moravia (now Czech Republic)
- Party: Communist Party (1968–1970); Civic Forum (1990–1991); Civic Movement (1991–1992); Social Democratic Party (1992–2007); Independent (2007–2009, 1970–1990); Party of Civic Rights (2009–2022)
- Spouses: Blanka Zemanová (m. 1971; div. 1978) Ivana Bednarčíková (m. 1993)
- Children: 2
- Education: University of Economics, Prague
- Website: Official website

Miloš Zeman (Czech: [ˈmɪloʃ ˈzɛman]; born 28 September 1944) is a Czech politician who served as the third president of the Czech Republic from 2013 to 2023. He also previously served as the prime minister of the Czech Republic from 1998 to 2002. As leader of the Czech Social Democratic Party from 1993 to 2001, he is credited with the revival of the party into one of the country's major political forces. Zeman briefly served as the President of the Chamber of Deputies from 1996 to 1998.

Born in Kolín to a modest family, Zeman joined the Communist Party of Czechoslovakia in 1968, but was expelled two years later due to his opposition to the Warsaw Pact invasion. Following the Velvet Revolution in 1989, he joined the Czech Social Democratic Party, which he led into the 1996 election.

Zeman became Prime Minister following the 1998 legislative election after striking a controversial pact with his long-time rival Václav Klaus, which was heavily criticized by President Václav Havel, the media and opposition for weakening the system of checks and balances. His government continued the privatization of publicly owned industries and established new administrative regions. Zeman's cabinet also attempted to change the electoral system to first-past-the-post voting, which was struck down by the Constitutional Court. Under his leadership, the Czech Republic joined NATO in 1999. Zeman was the last leader to vote in favor of the 1999 bombing of Yugoslavia, effectively green-lighting the operation. He ran for president in 2003 but was eliminated after his own party members did not vote for him.

In 2013, Zeman was elected president of the Czech Republic, becoming the first directly elected president in the nation's history; his predecessors were elected by the Parliament. In 2018, he was re-elected for a second term. His presidency was marked by deepening polarization and political discontent. Zeman has been a subject of widespread criticism and source of controversy. He was widely regarded as having pursued favourable policies towards Russia and China, while frequently clashing with traditional allies in the European Union and NATO. However, some of his supporters contest this characterization, and Zeman subsequently strongly opposed the Russian invasion of Ukraine. During his presidency, many of his high-level staff and associates were targets of investigations for mishandling classified information, corruption and fraud, among others. Zeman left office in 2023 and was succeeded by Petr Pavel.

== Early years ==
Zeman was born in Kolín. His parents divorced when he was two years old and he was raised by his mother, who was a teacher. He studied at a high school in Kolín, then from 1965 at the University of Economics in Prague, graduating in 1969.

Zeman joined the Communist Party of Czechoslovakia in 1968, during the Prague Spring, but was expelled in 1970 due to his opposition to the Warsaw Pact invasion of Czechoslovakia. He was dismissed from his job and spent more than ten years working for the sports organization Sportpropag (1971–84). From 1984, he worked at the company Agrodat, but he lost his job again in 1989, as a result of a critical article he had written in Technický magazín in August 1989, entitled "Prognostika a přestavba" (Forecasting and Perestroika).

== Political activities before presidency ==
In summer 1989, he appeared on Czechoslovak Television criticising the poor state of the Czechoslovak economy. His speech caused a scandal, but his views helped him join the leaders of the Civic Forum a few months later, during the Velvet Revolution.

In 1990 Zeman became a member of the House of the Nations of the Czechoslovak Federal Assembly. In 1992, he ran successfully for the House of the People of the Federal Assembly, already as a member of the Czechoslovak Social Democracy (ČSSD), which he joined the same year. In 1993, he was elected chairman of the party, and in the following years he transformed it into one of the country's major parties.

In the 1996 legislative election, ČSSD won enough seats to prevent the Civic Democratic Party (ODS), led by Zeman's rival Václav Klaus, from forming a majority government. Zeman became the President of the Chamber of Deputies and held this post until the early election in 1998.

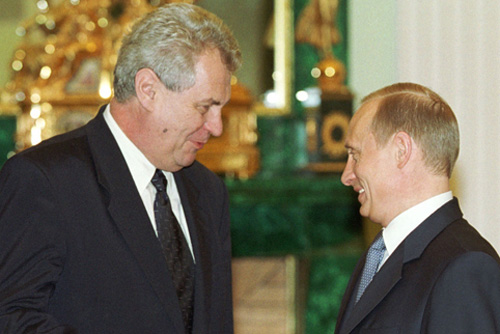
Prime Minister Zeman with Russian president Vladimir Putin in April 2002

In 1998, ČSSD won the election and Zeman became Prime Minister of a minority government, which he led for the next four years. In April 2001, he was replaced as leader by Vladimír Špidla. Zeman then retired and moved to live in the countryside in the Vysočina Region. He won a presidential primary in 2002 to become the ČSSD nominee for president, but lost the 2003 presidential election to Václav Klaus, due to party disunity. Zeman became an outspoken critic of his former party's leaders. He left ČSSD on 21 March 2007, due to conflicts with the party leader and chairman, Jiří Paroubek.

In October 2009, he founded a new party, Party of Civic Rights – Zemanovci. The party did not win any seats in the 2010, 2013 or 2017 legislative elections.

== Presidency (2013–2023) ==
In February 2012 Miloš Zeman announced his return to politics and intention to run in the first direct presidential election in the Czech Republic. Polls indicated that he was one of the two strongest candidates in the election, alongside Jan Fischer. Zeman narrowly won the first round of the elections and progressed to the second round to face Karel Schwarzenberg, winning by a clearer margin. His term began in March 2013.

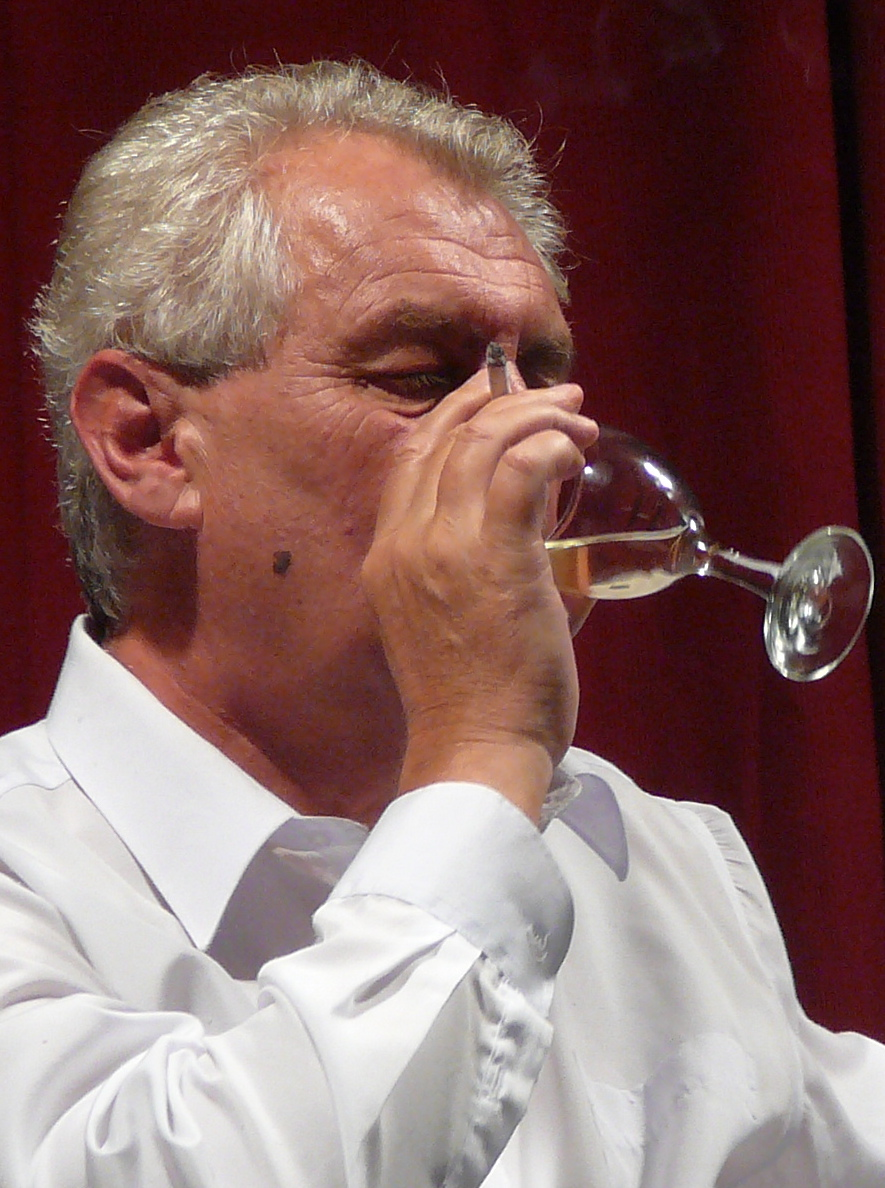
Zeman drinking wine and smoking at a public appearance in 2008

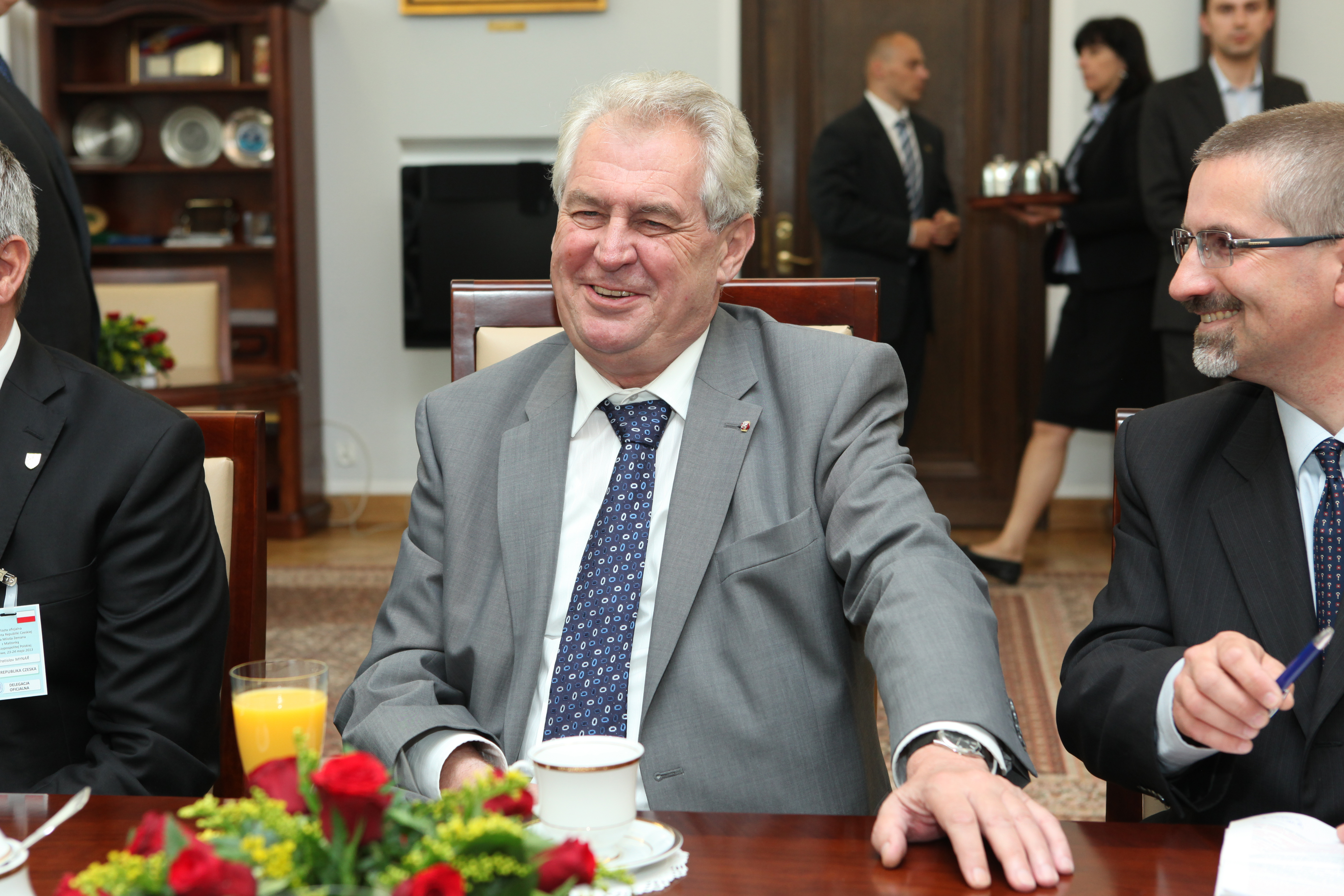
Zeman in the Senate of Poland, 24 May 2013

Zeman's alleged excessive alcohol consumption became a subject of public discussion and media attention on several occasions. Many Czechs believed he was drunk during his appearances at Czech TV headquarters, shortly after his victory in the 2013 presidential election, and during the exhibition of the Bohemian Crown Jewels.

In May 2013, Zeman refused to grant a tenured professorship to literary historian Martin C. Putna, due to Putna's appearance at 2011 Prague Gay Pride.

In June 2013, the coalition government led by Petr Nečas collapsed due to a corruption and spying scandal. Zeman, ignoring the political balance of power in the Czech Parliament, appointed his friend and long-term ally Jiří Rusnok as Prime Minister, and tasked him with forming a new government. This was described in parts of the Czech and foreign media as a political power grab, undermining parliamentary democracy and expanding his powers. On 10 July, during the appointment of Rusnok's cabinet, Zeman advised the new cabinet members not to "let yourself get annoyed by media criticism from jealous fools who have never in their lives done anything useful". Rusnok's government was short-lived, and resigned after losing a vote of confidence.

Zeman played an important role in a scandal that occurred in October 2013, shortly after the Czech legislative election. ČSSD First Deputy Chairman Michal Hašek and his allies in the party called for chairman Bohuslav Sobotka to resign following the party's poor election result, and excluded him from the team negotiating the next government. However, it subsequently emerged that Hašek and his allies had attended a secret post-election meeting with Zeman, where they were rumoured to have negotiated a 'coup' in ČSSD. Hašek initially denied the accusations, stating on Czech Television that "there was no meeting". However, his allies (deputies Milan Chovanec, Zdeněk Škromach, Jeroným Tejc, and Jiří Zimola) later admitted that the meeting took place. The event sparked public protests in the country and eventually led to Hašek apologising and resigning his position in the party. Zeman denied having initiated the meeting. His Party of Civic Rights – Zemanovci (SPOZ) received 1.5% of the vote in the election, winning no seats.

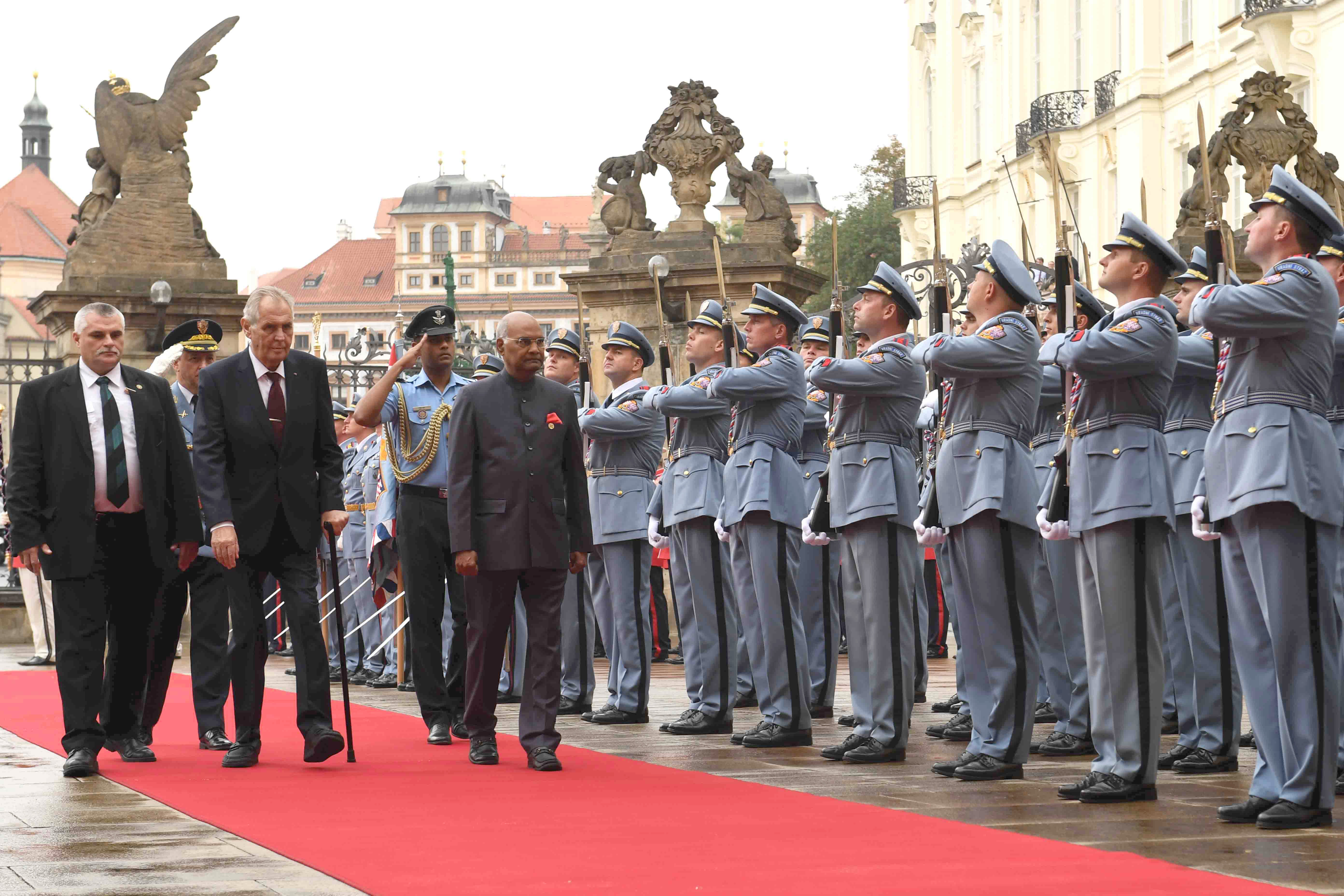
Zeman with Indian President Ram Nath Kovind on 7 September 2018

On 6 April 2014, in the wake of the annexation of Crimea, Zeman called for strong action to be taken, possibly including sending NATO forces into Ukraine, if Russia tried to annex the eastern part of the country. Speaking on a radio show he said that, "The moment Russia decides to widen its territorial expansion to the eastern part of Ukraine, that is where the fun ends. There I would plead not only for the strictest EU sanctions, but even for military readiness of the North Atlantic Alliance, like for example NATO forces entering Ukrainian territory." The Czech Republic joined NATO in 1999, when Zeman was prime minister. In the Czech constitutional system it is the government that has the main responsibility for foreign policy, although the president is commander-in-chief of the armed forces. The ČSSD government of Bohuslav Sobotka resisted strong EU sanctions against Russia after the annexation, because of the negative economic impact such sanctions would have had on the country.

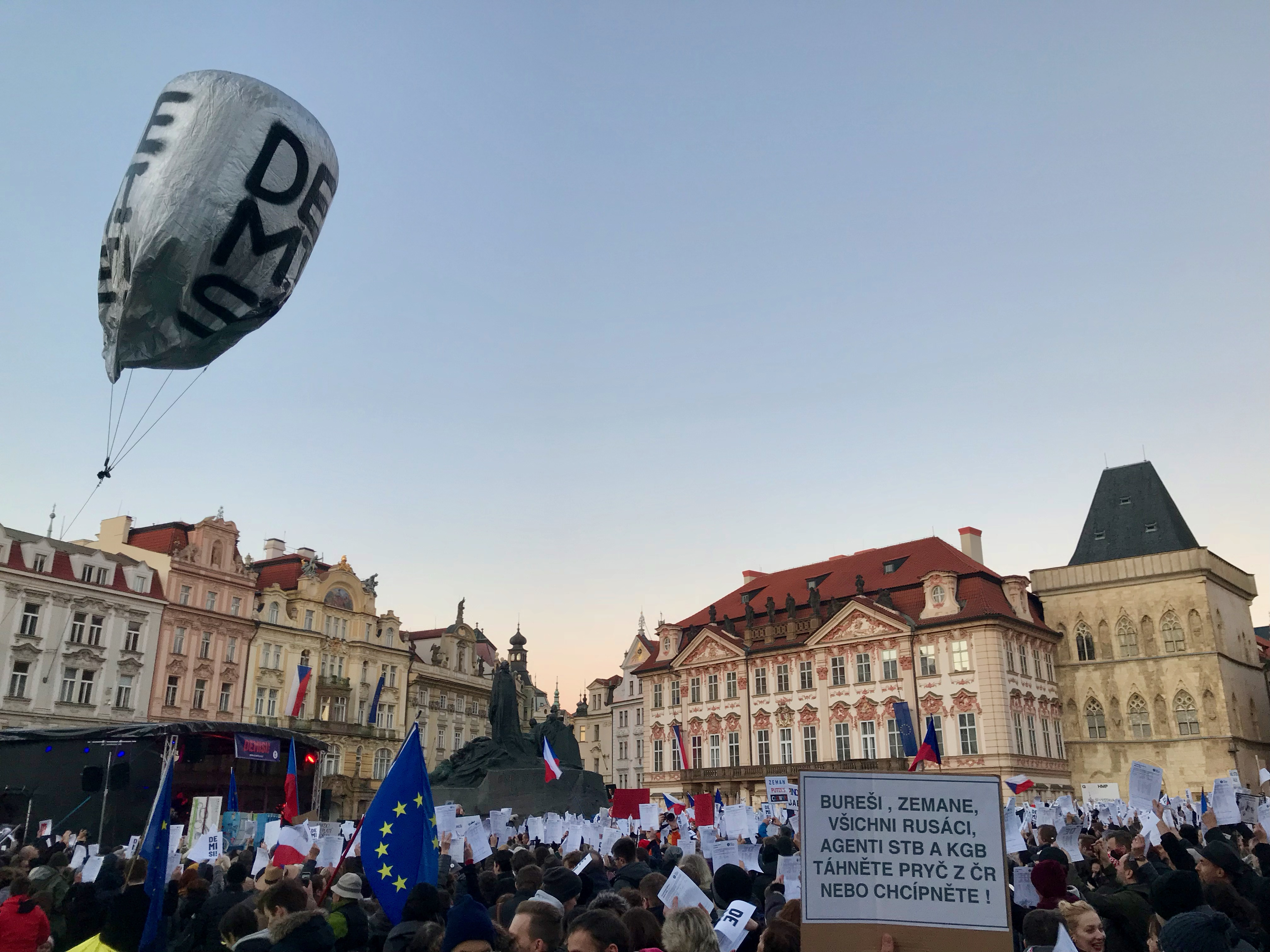
Protest against Zeman in Prague, 17 November 2018

In November 2014, on the 25th anniversary of the 1989 Velvet Revolution against communist rule, protests took place calling for Zeman's resignation. Protesters argued that Zeman had betrayed the legacy of Václav Havel, who helped Czechoslovakia and then Czech Republic become a champion of human rights, by being too sympathetic to authoritarian regimes and too close to Russia and China. They carried football-style red penalty cards as a warning of ejection to Zeman and threw eggs at him.

An opinion poll conducted by the CVVM agency in March 2016 reported that 62% of Czechs trusted President Miloš Zeman, up from 55% in September 2015. By December 2016, his approval rating had fallen to 48% following a series of scandals, with around 49% of those surveyed stating that they didn't trust him.

On 9 March 2017, during a meeting with his supporters, Zeman announced his intention to run again for the presidency, confirming his decision the next day in a press conference. He said that he had been persuaded by the support of the people. He stated that he did not think he was the favourite in the election, and that he would not run a political campaign, attack his rivals, or participate in debates. He also announced that he would participate in a television programme called A week with the President.

On 26 March 2017, during a radio interview, Zeman stated that someone had placed child pornography onto a computer in the official residence. Zeman claimed that he had called "IT guys", who had found out that the hackers were from Alabama in the United States. Later, Zeman's spokesman added that "the President, like every night, googled his own name on the internet and one of the pages contained child pornography". According to police, there was no evidence of a hacking attack on Zeman's computer.

Zeman decided to run for a second term and stood in the presidential elections in 2018. Observers compared the election to other elections such as the 2016 United States and 2017 French presidential elections, which saw a liberal internationalist and a right-wing populist running against each other. Zeman won the election with 51.37% in the second round.

On 25 July 2019, the Senate, for the first time in the history of the Czech Republic, approved and delivered to the Chamber of Deputies articles of impeachment against President Zeman, related to eight instances where he had allegedly acted in breach of the constitution, including naming and dismissing cabinet ministers, interference in court cases, and acting against the foreign interests of the Czech government. The Chamber of Deputies rejected indicting Zeman on 26 September 2019 with only 58 MPs voting for indictment out of 120 votes needed.

On 10 October 2021, the day after the 2021 Czech legislative election, Zeman was hospitalized, throwing the timeline for the start of government formation talks into doubt. After eight days with almost no details about Zeman's health condition from his spokesperson Jiří Ovčáček nor the head of the president's office Vratislav Mynář, Senate President Miloš Vystrčil said at a press conference that he had received an update from the Central Military Hospital (UVN) and the President's chief physician Miroslav Zavoral that Zeman was "currently unable to perform any work duties due to health reasons". On 25 November Zeman was discharged from the hospital after his condition improved. The hospital said it would have preferred Zeman to remain hospitalized, but accepted his decision. However, on the same day, he tested positive for COVID-19 and thus returned to the hospital for two more days.

On 19 October 2022, Zeman announced he would retire from politics at the end of his second term, in March 2023.

== Post-presidency ==
On 19 April 2023, Zeman opened a new office on Jaselská street in Prague 6, rented from the Prague Archbishopric. He said he expects to welcome visitors once a week.

Speaking as a guest at the Freedom and Direct Democracy leadership election in April 2024, Zeman stated his wish for the next Czech governing coalition to be composed of ANO 2011 and Freedom and Direct Democracy.

On 19 September 2025, Zeman stated in an interview with Radio Prostor that he would vote for Stačilo! in the upcoming 2025 Czech parliamentary election.

== Political views ==
Zeman was considered a centre-left politician during his premiership and term as leader of the Social Democrats, but as president he began to be associated with far-right anti-immigration policies in response to the European migrant crisis. The Guardian described Zeman as "left-of-centre" in the run-up to the 2013 presidential election, but as "far-right" and a populist in 2018. The Independent described him as a "right-wing populist" in 2018. The New York Times described Zeman as a "populist leftist" in 2016. Other outlets have simply labeled Zeman a populist. He was compared to United States president Donald Trump by Western press, and endorsed Trump's 2016 presidential campaign.

=== China ===
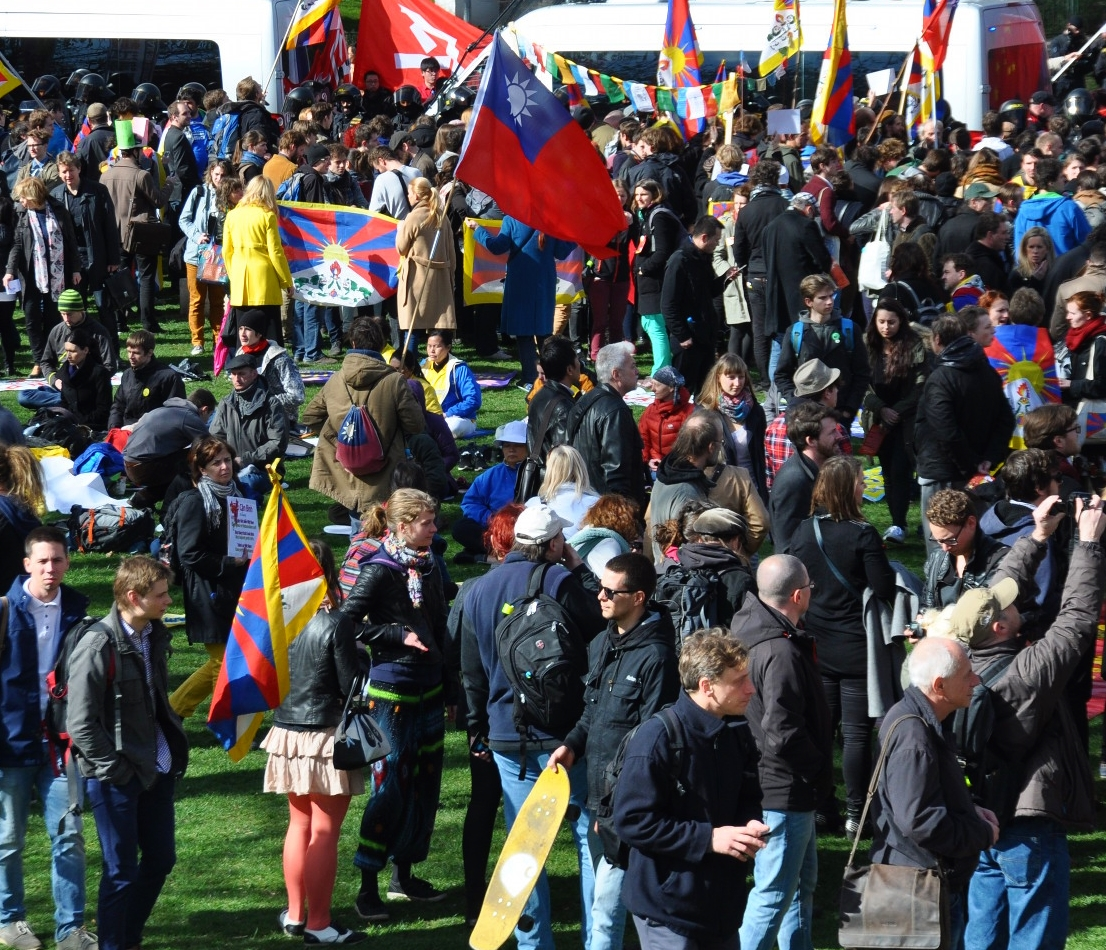
2016 demonstration against Zeman and China in Prague with picture of late President Václav Havel and Tibetan religious leader 14th Dalai Lama with flags of Tibet and Taiwan

In 2014, he attracted criticism when he said he wished to learn how China had "stabilized" its society. In 2016 he invited Chinese president Xi Jinping on a state visit, which sparked a wave of protest. He labeled pro-Tibet protestors "mentally impaired individuals" and used police to prevent protesters from reaching Prague Castle. Police also entered a building of the Film and TV School of the Academy of Performing Arts (FAMU) to remove a Tibetan flag which had been hung out of a window. Finance Minister Miroslav Kalousek accused Zeman of "bootlicking authoritarian and unfree regimes". Those actions were seen by critics as a contravention of Czech society's freedom of expression, and protests were held by at least 50 members of the two chambers of the Parliament, opposition leaders and civil society groups as well as hundreds of supporters of Taiwan, Tibet, and Turkic Uyghur separatists in Xinjiang.

Zeman appointed Ye Jianming, the founder and chairman of CEFC China Energy, as his economic adviser. The company is linked to the People's Liberation Army. CEFC China Energy acquired multiple assets in the Czech Republic, including travel agencies and media companies.

=== Gun control ===
In 2016, following a number of terror attacks around Europe, Zeman joined a number of other Czech politicians and security professionals in urging the 240,000 gun owners in the country with concealed carry licences to carry their firearms, in order to be able to contribute to the protection of soft targets. Zeman's wife also obtained a concealed carry license and a revolver.

=== European Union ===
Zeman has expressed both supportive and critical positions regarding the European Union. As prime minister, he helped bring the Czech Republic into the EU, and he has described himself as a "federalist" who supports EU membership. Before becoming president, he promised to fly the flag of Europe at Prague Castle, something that Zeman's predecessor, Václav Klaus, refused to do; he did so shortly after taking office. On the same day, Zeman ratified the Treaty Establishing the European Stability Mechanism, which Klaus had also refused to do, making the Czech Republic the last country to do so. In June 2017, Zeman stated that Czech people are "irrationally afraid" of adopting the Euro as the Czech Republic's currency.

Despite his pro-EU statements and actions, Zeman supports holding a referendum on Czech EU membership similar to the Brexit referendum held in the United Kingdom in 2016. He also has been labelled a Eurosceptic and opposes the EU's migrant quotas. Some of his critics have accused him of having pro-Russia leanings, favouring it over the EU.

=== Environment and climate change ===
Like his predecessor and former opponent Václav Klaus, Zeman is a climate change denier. He has said that in his opinion, human activity probably cannot influence global warming.

When the environmental movement Hnutí DUHA tried to protect a national park from illegal logging, Zeman said he would treat them in a "good old medieval way: burn them, piss on them and salt them".

=== Israel ===
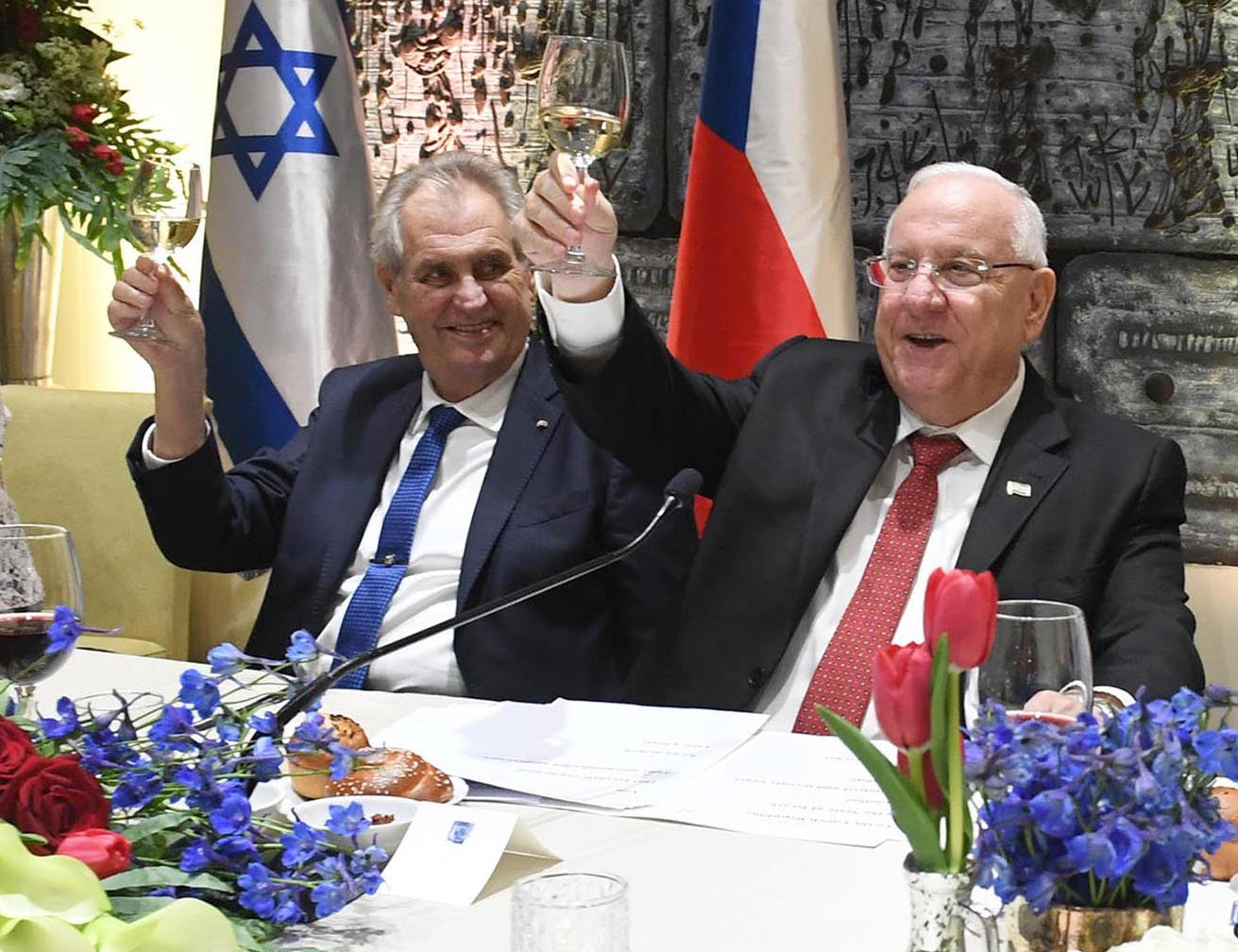
Zeman and Israeli President Reuven Rivlin in a state dinner in honor of Zeman, Jerusalem, Israel, 26 November 2018

Zeman is a long-standing supporter of the State of Israel. Zeman was one of the most prominent international leaders to support the U.S. recognition of Jerusalem as Israel's capital under President Donald Trump, and he voiced support for following the US in moving its Israeli embassy to Jerusalem. He criticized the EU's position on Jerusalem, calling its member states "cowards" and stating that they "are doing all they can so a pro-Palestinian terrorist movement can have supremacy over a pro-Israeli movement."

Zeman ordered the Israeli flag to fly at the Prague Castle to show support for Israel amid the 2021 Israel–Palestine crisis.

=== LGBTQ people ===
In June 2021, Zeman described transgender people as "disgusting" in a TV interview, and said that Pride protests were minorities trying to put themselves on a superior footing to others. He also said that if he were younger, he would organize a counter-demonstration of heterosexuals. He also said during the interview that he supported recent laws passed in Hungary banning the mention of LGBTQ issues in the education system.

=== Kosovo ===
Zeman is opposed to having a Czech embassy in Kosovo. He said that he is against the recognition of Kosovo, and has described it as a "terror regime financed by the illegal drug trade". Whilst visiting Belgrade in 2014, he stated his opposition to the formation of an independent Kosovan army, equating it to the Kosovo Liberation Army (KLA). He commented on the history of terrorist acts committed by the KLA, and noted that its disbanding was a component of the peace agreements. During the same visit, he said he hoped Serbia would join the European Union soon.

=== Middle East and views on Islam ===
Zeman has expressed concern about the growth of Islamic terrorism and of ISIL. In June 2011, Zeman said, referring to Islam, "The enemy is the anti-civilization spreading from North Africa to Indonesia. Two billion people live in it and it is financed partly from oil sales and partly from drug sales." He likened Muslims who believe in the Qur'an to followers of Nazism.

Zeman called for unified armed operation against Islamic State (ISIL) led by the U.N. Security Council. In June 2015, Zeman commented that: "If European countries accept a wave of migrants, there will be terrorist groups among them, of which also a Libyan minister has warned. By accepting the migrants, we strongly facilitate Islamic State’s expansion to Europe." Zeman described the Middle Eastern refugees arriving in Europe as an "organized invasion". In September 2015, Zeman rejected the European Union's proposal of compulsory migrant quotas, saying, "Only the future will show that this was a big mistake".

Zeman said that Turkey should not be in the European Union and criticised Turkish President Erdoğan's anti-European rhetoric. He also accused Turkey of allying with ISIL in its fight against Syrian Kurds.

=== United States and NATO ===
Zeman, who played a role in the Czech Republic's accession to NATO, has called for a referendum on NATO membership, though he supports remaining in the organization. In November 2012, during a speech at the University of Economics, Prague, Zeman explained his dislike for Madeleine Albright, former US Secretary of State. Zeman stated that Albright had promised that there would be no bombardment of civilians during the 1999 NATO bombing of Serbia. "And Madeleine Albright made a promise, and Madeleine Albright didn't keep the promise. Since then, I don't like her."

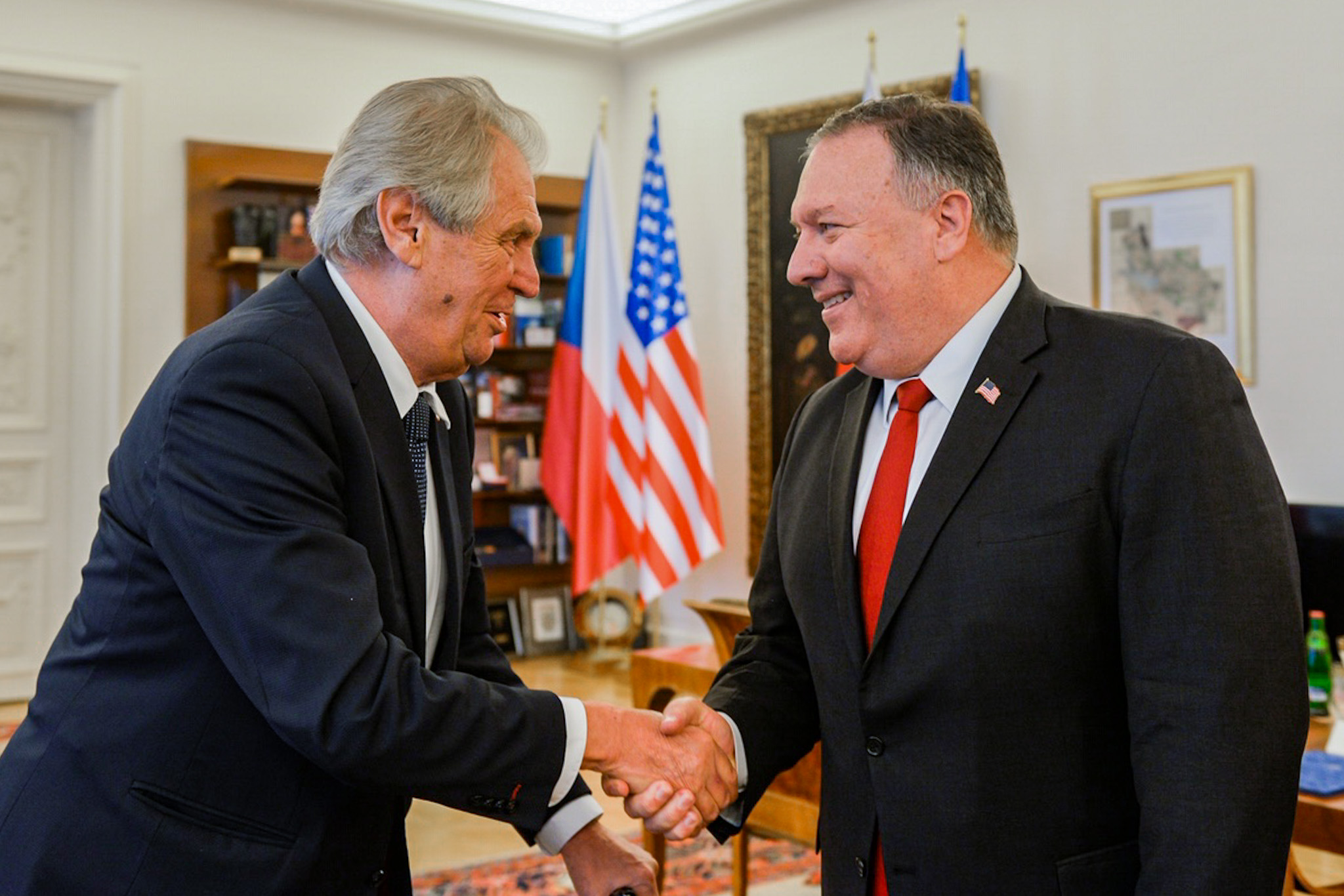
Zeman with U.S. Secretary of State Mike Pompeo on 12 August 2020

In March 2015, Zeman criticised protests against the US Army's military convoy (called the "Dragoon Ride") crossing the Czech Republic following NATO exercises in Poland and the Baltic states:

"In the past months I have been fighting anti-Russian fools, but most recently I have had to fight anti-American fools as well, since fools are evenly spread on both sides. ... I disagree with the U.S. troops being labelled an occupation army for one simple reason. We experienced occupation twice last century [1939 and 1968] and we know what it looks like."

— Miloš Zeman

On 18 May 2021, during a visit by the president of Serbia, Aleksandar Vučić, Zeman apologized to Serbia for the 1999 NATO bombing, describing it as a "mistake and worse than a crime".

=== Poland ===
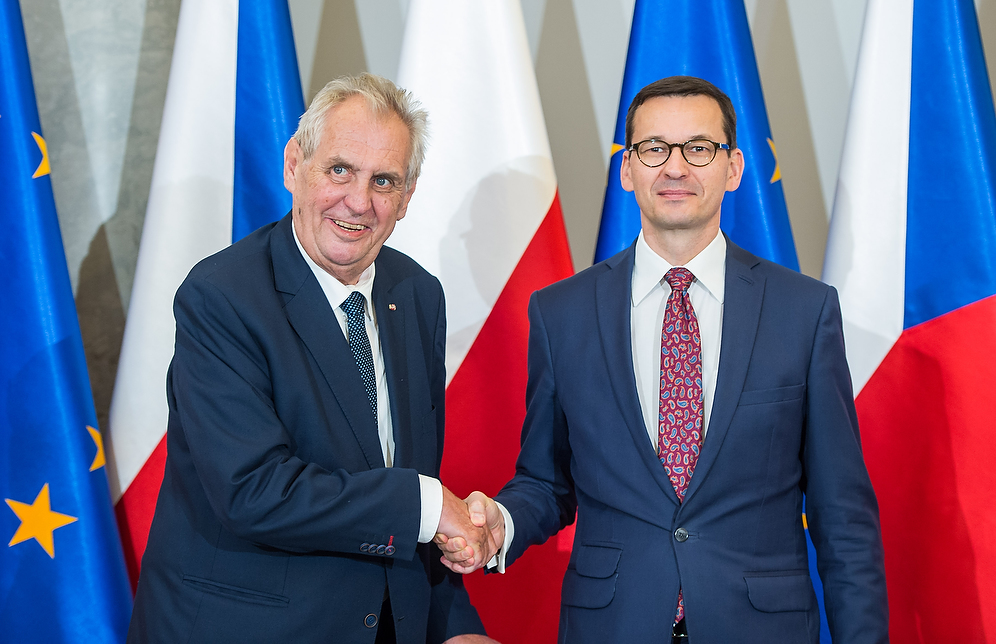
Zeman with Polish Prime Minister Mateusz Morawiecki in Warsaw, on 10 May 2018

In March 2016, Zeman defended Poland's newly elected Law and Justice government, saying: “I expressed the view that the Polish government, which was created as a result of free elections, has every right to carry out activities for which it received a mandate in these elections. It should not be subject to moralising or criticism from the European Union, which should finally focus on its primary task – to protect the external borders of the Union.”

=== Russia ===
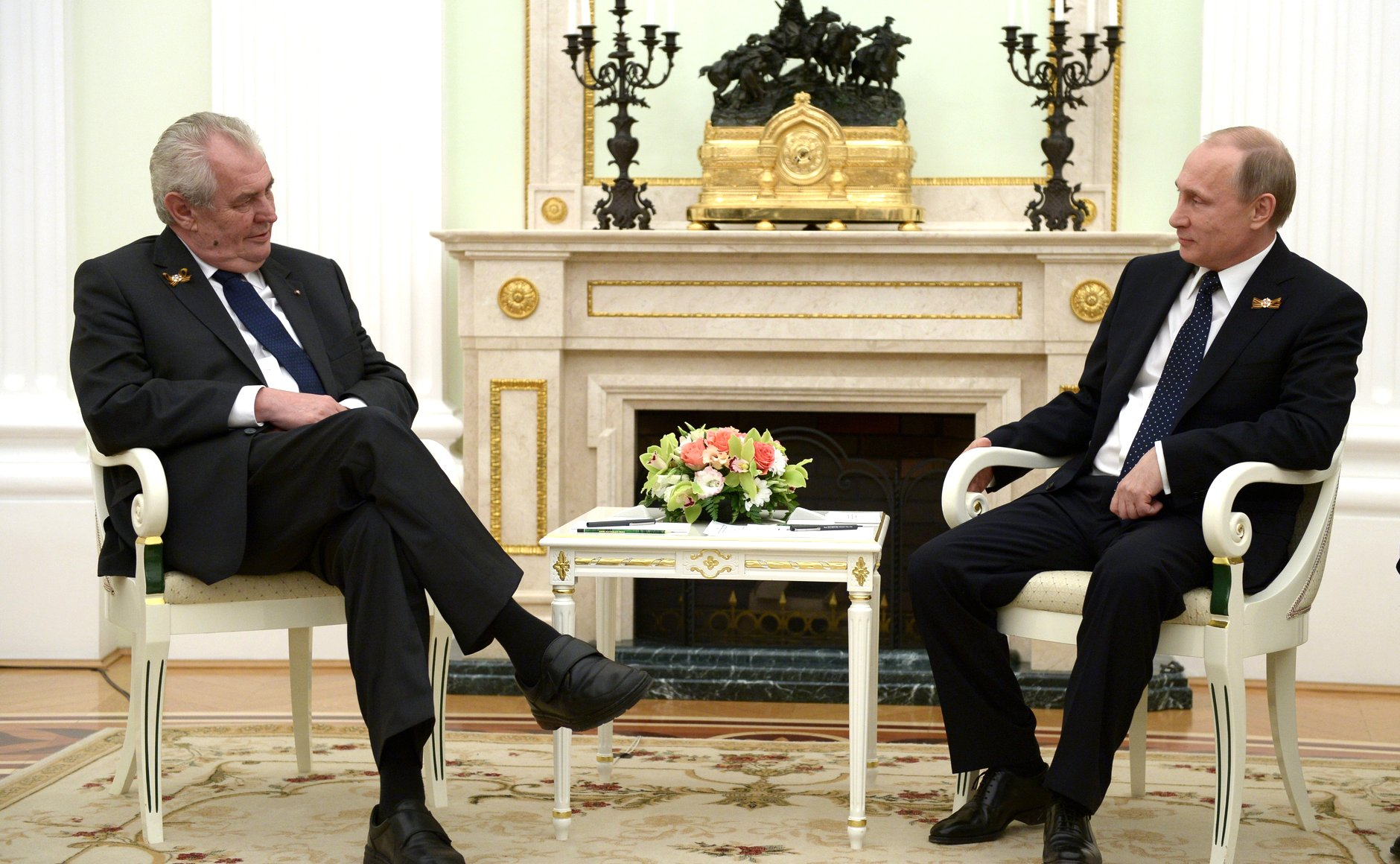
Zeman meets with Russian President Vladimir Putin in Moscow on 8 May 2015

Zeman described the war in Donbas as "a civil war between two groups of Ukrainian citizens" with foreign support, and compared it to the Spanish Civil War. Regarding the annexation of Crimea by the Russian Federation, he noted that the Kosovo precedent was used as an argument for the separation of Crimea from Ukraine.

Zeman announced that he intended to visit Moscow for the 2015 Victory Day celebrations and the 70th anniversary of the liberation from Nazi Germany. He said that he was not going to look at military equipment, but rather to honour the soldiers who had sacrificed their lives. He described his visit to Moscow as an "expression of thankfulness that we in this country don't have to speak German, if we would have become submissive collaborators of Aryan origin", and that "we don't have to say Heil Hitler, Heil Himmler, Heil Göring, and eventually Heil Heydrich, that would have been particularly interesting". Most other EU leaders declared that they would not attend the events due to the conflict in eastern Ukraine. U.S. ambassador Andrew H. Schapiro criticized the decision, saying that it would "be awkward" if Zeman was the only politician from the EU at the ceremony. Zeman responded by banning him from the Prague Castle.

"I cannot imagine that the Czech ambassador in Washington would advise the US president where he should travel. And I will not allow any ambassador to have a say in my foreign travel plans."

— Miloš Zeman

The ban was later lifted by Zeman's office.

In December 2019, Zeman criticised Russian protests against the Czech decision to recognise the anniversary of the Soviet-led Warsaw Pact invasion of Czechoslovakia in 1968 as a day commemorating the victims, describing it as "absolute insolence".

In April 2021, Zeman cast doubt on Russia's involvement in the 2014 Vrbětice ammunition warehouses explosions, suggesting that the deadly blast could have been caused accidentally due to the mishandling of explosives, and that there was no conclusive evidence to accuse Russia. In response, thousands of demonstrators took to the streets in Prague on 29 April 2021, calling Zeman "a servant" of Russia, and demanding he be tried for treason.

In response to the 2022 Russian invasion of Ukraine, Zeman called for Russia to be cut off from SWIFT. He condemned Russia's invasion of Ukraine and called for tough sanctions to isolate "the madman" Putin. On 1 March 2022, eight former signatories of Charter 77 including Petr Pithart and Anna Šabatová called on Zeman to resign over his previous support for Putin.

=== Ukraine ===
In 2015, Zeman, in response to a letter from a group of Czech and Ukrainian historians defending Stepan Bandera, leader of the Organization of Ukrainian Nationalists (OUN), wrote: "I would like to point out that President Yushchenko declared Bandera a national hero, and a similar declaration in the case of Roman Shukhevych, who became known to have shot thousands of Jews in Lvov in 1941, is now being prepared. I can not congratulate Ukraine on such national heroes."

On 7 March 2022, Zeman decided to award Ukrainian President Volodymyr Zelenskyy with the highest state award of the Czech Republic, the Order of the White Lion, for "his bravery and courage in the face of Russia's invasion".

== Criticism and controversies ==
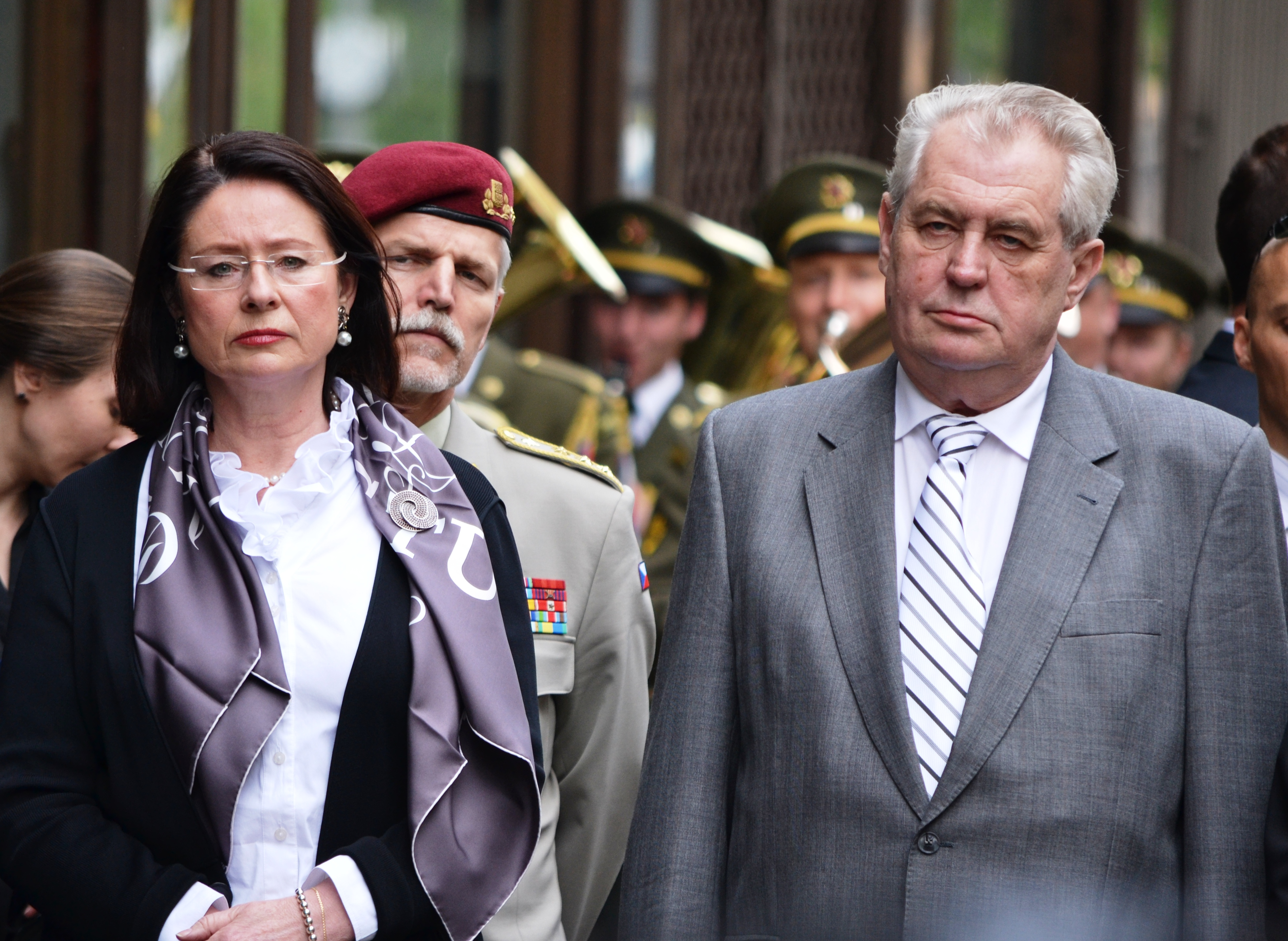
Zeman (right) and Miroslava Němcová, former President of the Chamber of Deputies (May 2013). In June 2013, the Civic Democratic Party (the leading party of the parliamentary coalition government) nominated her for the post of the Prime Minister; however, Zeman refused to appoint her and instead chose his long-time ally and friend Jiří Rusnok

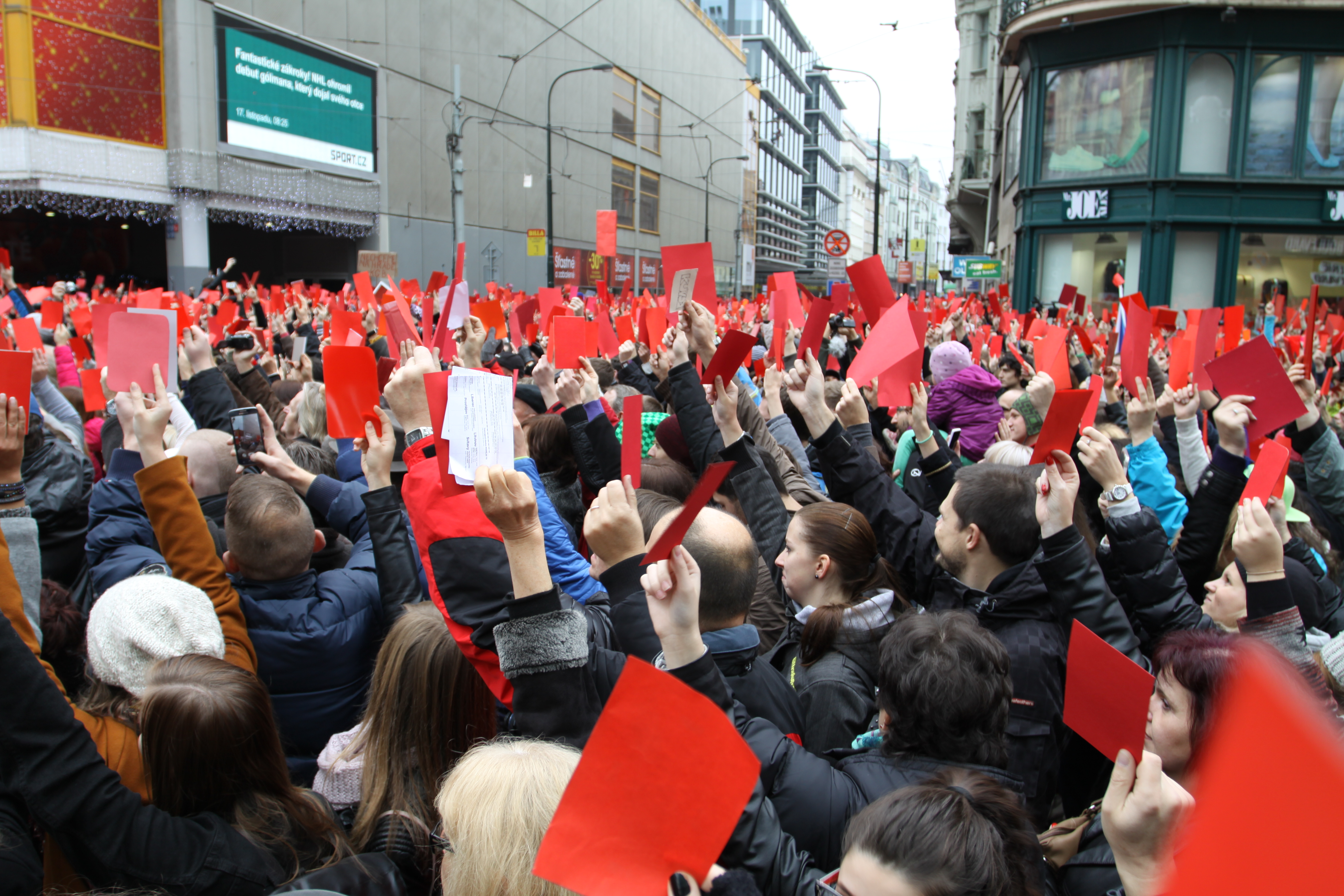
Czechs showing red cards to the President during the protest named "I Want to Talk to You, Mr. President", on 17 November 2014, the 25th anniversary of the Velvet Revolution.

In 1996, before the legislative election, Zeman met with Czech-Swiss entrepreneur Jan Vízek in the German city of Bamberg. In the so-called "Bamberg Memorandum", a group of Swiss entrepreneurs allegedly agreed to fund the ČSSD pre-election campaign in exchange for economic influence in the Czech Republic after the election. The investigation ended in 2000, with Vízek convicted of falsification of the memorandum by copying signatures from earlier documents. He later admitted that he had intentionally publicised the case in order to compromise Zeman before the next elections in 1998. Zeman was never charged with any wrongdoing, but the reason for the meetings between Zeman and Vízek in 1996 was never revealed.

In 1999, one of Zeman's advisers, Jaroslav Novotný, allegedly blackmailed the director of the state-owned Štiřín Castle, Václav Hrubý. Novotný allegedly pressured him to falsify evidence in order to prove that former Foreign Minister Josef Zieleniec corrupted journalists. The police confirmed the blackmail, but no charges were ever brought.

Zeman has been criticized for his contacts with the powerful Czech lobbyist Miroslav Šlouf, formerly his chief adviser. While Zeman was prime minister, Šlouf maintained contact with the controversial entrepreneur František Mrázek, nicknamed the "Godfather of Czech Organized Crime". Šlouf and Mrázek met and exchanged information at the Office of the Czech Government. Mrázek was assassinated in 2006. In leaked wiretapping records, he nicknames Zeman mlha ("fog") and claims that Zeman "could not be bribed, and wanted only a sandwich, three pickles and for people to like him." In 2010, Šlouf and Martin Nejedlý, a representative of the Russian oil company LUKoil in the Czech Republic, were the main donors to his Party of Civic Rights – Zemanovci, but Zeman denied that he had any connection with Lukoil.

In 2002, German chancellor Gerhard Schröder cancelled an official visit to Prague after Zeman called the ethnic Germans in pre-war Czechoslovakia "Hitler's Fifth column". Zeman stated that "the Czechs and Slovaks were doing the Sudeten Germans a favor by expelling them, because they granted them their wish to go Heim ins Reich". Later, Zeman called Karel Schwarzenberg, his rival in the presidential campaign of 2013, a "sudeťák" (Sudeten German), leading the Austrian Die Presse to ascribe Zeman's victory to an "unprecedented anti-German dirty campaign."

On 26 May 2014, during festivities celebrating the independence of Israel, Zeman said "So let me quote one of their [Islamic] sacred texts to support this statement: "A tree says, there is a Jew behind me, come and kill him. A stone says, there is a Jew behind me, come and kill him." I would criticize those calling for the killing of Arabs, but I do not know of any movement calling for mass murdering of Arabs. However, I know of one anti-civilization movement calling for the mass murder of Jews." When criticized and urged to apologise by the Organisation of Islamic Cooperation, his office replied "President Zeman definitely does not intend to apologise. For the president would consider it blasphemy to apologise for the quotation of a sacred Islamic text."

Zeman's comments on the Jewish Museum of Belgium shooting and "Islamic ideology" in June 2014 caused a diplomatic dispute with Saudi Arabia. The diplomatic source said: "The Saudis had an exact list of what Zeman said on the issue in the past. The list had several pages. The [Czech] ambassador was in a very unpleasant situation as the protest had never gone so far before."

On 17 November 2014, the 25th anniversary of the Velvet Revolution, thousands of Czechs took part in a demonstration against Zeman, protesting his pro-Russian stance and vulgar language. Eggs were also thrown, with one accidentally hitting the German president, Joachim Gauck; German officials said it was just a piece of eggshell. On the same day, a group of about 60 people held a counter-demonstration in support of president Zeman.

In September 2017 Zeman suggested that Bosnia and Herzegovina could become a base for Islamic State, causing a diplomatic row and provoking criticism from President Bakir Izetbegović and the Bosniak public.

=== Lawsuits ===
Zeman has a long history of losing lawsuits regarding his public comments. In 1993 Zeman lost his lawsuit over his defamatory statement towards former police officer Milan Hruška. He falsely accused him of lack of intelligence and inadequate education. Zeman was fined, but ignored the court ruling and never apologised.

In 1997 Zeman accused his party colleague Jozef Wagner of wanting to join the Communist Party after leaving his faction in the Chamber of Deputies. Zeman lost the lawsuit and was ordered to apologise and pay compensation. Zeman initially ignored the ruling, before apologising in 2001. In 2000, Prague City court ordered Zeman to apologise to politician Miroslav Macek after he described him as a "thief". In 2007, Prague City court ruled that Zeman had unlawfully accused journalist Ivan Brezina of corruption. Zeman was ordered to publicly apologise by means of a newspaper article and pay 50,000 CZK in damages.

On 19 February 2012, the Supreme Administrative Court ruled that Zeman's campaign team had lied during the presidential campaign. According to the court ruling, this did not affect the outcome of the elections.

On 2 March 2016, The Prague 1 District Court ruled that Zeman had falsely accused well-known journalist Ferdinand Peroutka of comments that appeared to be positive about Adolf Hitler. According to the preliminary judgement the Office of the President had to publicly apologise to Terezie Kaslová, Peroutka's descendant. After the final appeal failed, the president's office announced on 23 September that it would appeal in the Supreme Court. Zeman said that he was not suffering from senile dementia and insisted that the article existed. His spokesperson Jiří Ovčáček has been looking for it since February 2015. The office was fined 100,000 Kč in October 2016 for failing to apologise. However, the Supreme Court stated on 28 October 2016 that the apology would not be necessary until the court had ruled on the Office's appeal.

On 1 April 2024, Supreme Court of the Czech Republic ruled that Zeman in November 2017 had falsely informed about his former adviser Zdeňek Šarapatka of being fired for incompetence and was ordered to apologise. On 17 April 2024, Šarapatka received a letter with Zeman's apology for his defamatory statement.

== Personal life ==
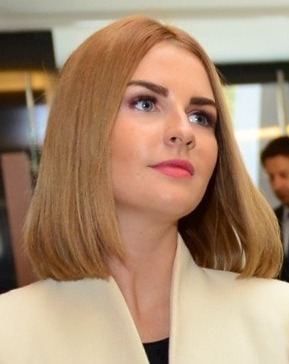
Kateřina Zemanová, Miloš Zeman's daughter

In the 1970s, Zeman was married to Blanka Zemanová; the couple divorced in 1978. In 1993, he married his assistant Ivana Bednarčíková (born 29 April 1965).

He has an adult son named David from his first marriage. His daughter from the second, Kateřina Zemanová (born 1 January 1994), was one of the most visible faces in Zeman's presidential election team. In a post-election speech, Zeman asked her to be his "informal First Lady", as his wife is reportedly shy and does not like media attention. When asked about his religious beliefs, he describes himself as a "tolerant atheist".

Zeman is a heavy drinker and long-term chain smoker. He only slightly curbed his consumption of alcohol and cigarettes after being diagnosed with diabetes in 2015. He is also suffering from diabetic neuropathy in the feet, which causes him difficulties when walking and sometimes requires him to use a wheelchair. In March 2024, he was hospitalized in serious but stable condition and underwent surgery following a blood clot in his leg. He was discharged in April.

== State awards ==
=== National ===
- Former ex-officio Sovereign of the Order of the White Lion (8 March 2013 – 8 March 2023)
- Former ex-officio Sovereign of the Order of Tomáš Garrigue Masaryk (8 March 2013 – 8 March 2023)

=== Foreign ===
- Austria: Grand Star of the Decoration of Honour for Services to the Republic of Austria (2 March 2023)
- Germany: Grand Cross Special Class of the Order of Merit of the Federal Republic of Germany (5 May 2014)
- Hungary: Grand Cross with Chain of the Hungarian Order of Merit (3 March 2023)
- Israel: Recipient of the Israeli Presidential Medal of Honour (11 July 2022)
- Jordan: Grand Cordon with Collar of the Order of Al-Hussein bin Ali (11 February 2015)
- North Macedonia: Recipient of the Order 8-September (9 June 2016)
- Poland: Knight of the Order of the White Eagle (15 March 2016)
- Serbia: Second Class of the Order of the Republic of Serbia (15 February 2020)
- Slovakia: First Class of the Order of the White Double Cross (27 May 2014)
- Slovenia: Recipient of the Order for Exceptional Merits (18 February 2016)

Party political offices
Preceded by Jiří Horák	Leader of the Social Democratic Party; 1993–2001	Succeeded by Vladimír Špidla
New political party	Leader of the Party of Civic Rights; 2010	Succeeded by Vladimír Hönig; Acting
Political offices
Preceded by Milan Uhde	President of the Chamber of Deputies; 1996–1998	Succeeded by Václav Klaus
Preceded by Josef Tošovský	Prime Minister of the Czech Republic; 1998–2002	Succeeded by Vladimír Špidla
Preceded by Václav Klaus	President of the Czech Republic; 2013–2023	Succeeded by Petr Pavel
