= Federal Constitution =

Federal Constitution may refer to:

- the United States Constitution
- the Swiss Federal Constitution
- the Malaysian Federal Constitution
- the Federal Constitution of the United Mexican States (disambiguation), several meanings
- the Federal Constitution of 1949, former federal constitution of Indonesia
- the Constitution of India, basis for the federal system in India

== See also ==
- Federal constitutional law (disambiguation)
