= Constitution Act =

The Constitution Act or Constitutional Act is the name of several pieces of legislation including:

- The Constitution of Australia
- The Constitution of New South Wales
- The Constitution of South Australia
- The Constitution of Victoria
- The Constitution of Tasmania
- The Constitution of Queensland
- Several acts forming part of the Constitution of Canada, such as:
  - The Constitution Act, 1867, formerly called the British North America Act 1867 (30 & 31 Vict. c. 3)
  - The Constitution Act, 1982
  - The Constitution Act (British Columbia)
- Constitutional Act 1791 (31 Geo. 3. c. 31), which divided Quebec into Upper Canada and Lower Canada for the benefit of newly arrived English-speakers
- Constitutional act of the Czech Republic, the name of a kind of law in the Czech Republic which alters the Constitution
- Various pieces of Danish legislation, including:
  - Constitutional Act of the Kingdom of Denmark (1849), which provided the modern constitution for Denmark, ending the previous absolute monarchy
  - The Danish Act of Succession, known formally as, The Constitutional Act of Denmark of June 5, 1953
- Some laws in or formerly in the Constitution of New Zealand:
  - New Zealand Constitution Act 1846 (9 & 10 Vict. c. 103)
  - New Zealand Constitution Act 1852 (15 & 16 Vict. c. 72)
  - The current Constitution Act 1986
- Niue Constitution Act
- The Republic of South Africa Constitution Act, 1961; a former constitution active until 1983 in apartheid-era South Africa that established a republican form of government
- The Republic of South Africa Constitution Act, 1983; a former constitution active until 1994 in apartheid-era South Africa

== See also ==
- Constitution
- Constitutional law (disambiguation)
