= Supermajority =

Voting requirement above 50% for passage

A supermajority is a requirement for a proposal to gain a specified level of support which is greater than the threshold of one-half. The threshold of one-half is used for a simple majority, which is sometimes expressed as a "50% + 1 vote". Supermajority rules in a democracy can help to prevent a majority from eroding fundamental rights of a minority, but can also hamper efforts to respond to problems and encourage corrupt compromises at times when action is taken. Changes to constitutions, especially those with entrenched clauses, commonly require supermajority support in a legislature. In consensus democracy, the supermajority rule is applied in most cases.

== History ==
The first known use of a supermajority rule was in juries during the 100s BC in ancient Rome. In some cases, two thirds of jurors had to confirm they were ready to take a decision before the matter went to a simple majority vote.

Pope Alexander III introduced the use of supermajority rule for papal elections at the Third Lateran Council in 1179.

In the Democratic Party of the United States, a rule requiring the determination of a presidential nominee by the votes of two-thirds of delegates to the Democratic National Convention was adopted at the party's first presidential nominating convention in 1832. The two-thirds rule gave southern Democrats a de facto veto over any presidential nominee after the Civil War, which lasted until the rule was abolished in 1936.

In the Federalist Papers, Alexander Hamilton and James Madison were critical of supermajority requirements. In Federalist 22, Hamilton wrote that while preventing harmful legislation from being passed, such requirements also prevented beneficial legislation from being passed, and "its real operation is to embarrass the administration, to destroy the energy of government, and to substitute the pleasure, caprice or artifices of an insignificant, turbulent or corrupt junto, to the regular deliberations and decisions of a respectable majority". Hamilton also wrote that such a requirement would encourage "contemptible compromises of the public good". In Federalist 58, Madison wrote that supermajority requirements might help impede the passage of "hasty and partial measures", but "[i]n all cases where justice or the general good might require new laws to be passed, or active measures to be pursued, the fundamental principle of free government would be reversed. It would be no longer the majority that would rule; the power would be transferred to the minority." Madison also wrote that such requirements would encourage secession.

== Common thresholds of supermajority ==
A majority vote, or more than half the votes cast, is a common voting basis. Instead of the basis of a majority, a supermajority can be specified using any fraction or percentage which is greater than one-half. Common supermajorities include three-fifths (60%), two-thirds (66.666...%), and three-quarters (75%). In most cases, if the supermajority fraction or percentage of votes yields a non-whole number, it is rounded to the next higher whole number.

=== Three-quarters ===
The Constitution of the United States requires a three-quarters majority of the states to ratify a constitutional amendment.

The current Constitution of the Republic of China (Taiwan) requires a three-quarters majority of the Legislative Yuan to pass a constitutional amendment (which brings it to the voters for ratification).

=== Two-thirds ===
A two-thirds vote, when unqualified, means two-thirds or more of the votes cast. This voting basis is equivalent to the number of votes in favor being at least twice the number of votes against. Abstentions and absences may be excluded when calculating a two-thirds vote.

The two-thirds requirement can be qualified to include the entire membership of a body instead of only those present and voting, but such a requirement must be explicitly stated (such as "two-thirds of those members duly elected and sworn"). In this case, abstentions and absences count as votes against the proposal. Alternatively, the voting requirement could be specified as "two-thirds of those present", which has the effect of counting abstentions but not absences as votes against the proposal.

For example, if there are 100 eligible voters, then 67 votes are required for a supermajority (two-thirds of 100, rounded up). However, if any one voter abstains or is absent, then the total decreases to 99, and the required votes for a supermajority drop to 66 (two-thirds of 99).

In Italy, between 1948 and 1993, the Senate was divided into a number of single-seat constituencies, where, to get elected in a FPTP vote, a two-thirds majority of votes was required. Usually, it was attainable only for the South Tyrolean People's Party senators representing the German-speaking minority of South Tyrol, thus most other Senators were still elected proportionally in regional constituencies, after being grouped in party lists.

Two-thirds is the most common supermajority requirement in the US Constitution, as set out in: Article I with regard to veto overrides; Article II with regard to treaty ratification and to presidential conviction and removal after an impeachment; and Article V with regard to the proposal of constitutional amendments either by Congress or via petitions by the states.

Systems that exercise consensus based on a minimum threshold of two-thirds super-majority also some-what reflect the technical mathematical attributes of Byzantine Fault Tolerance which requires a super-majority consensus agreement greater than a minimum threshold of two-thirds of a group.

=== Three-fifths ===
Another type of supermajority is three-fifths (60 percent). This requirement could also be qualified to include the entire membership or to include those present.

In 2006, the Constitution of Florida was amended to require a 60% majority to pass new constitutional amendments by popular vote.

In Poland, the Sejm (lower house of the bicameral parliament of Poland) requires a three-fifths majority of MPs present to overturn a veto from the President of Poland.

A three-fifths majority is needed to break a filibuster in the United States Senate, according to the Senate's own rules.

Procedural decisions in the United Nations Security Council require a de facto three-fifths majority (spelled out in the United Nations Charter as nine out of fifteen members).

=== 55% ===
For the Montenegrin independence referendum held in 2006 the European Union envoy Miroslav Lajčák proposed independence if a 55% supermajority of votes are cast in favor with a minimum turnout of 50%. Such procedure, ultimately accepted by the government of Montenegro, was somewhat criticized as overriding the traditional practice of requiring a two-thirds supermajority, as practiced in all former Yugoslav countries before (including the previous referendum in Montenegro). The requirement for 50% turnout has also been criticized for causing no-show paradoxes.

In 2016, the Constitution of Colorado was amended to require a 55% majority to pass new constitutional amendments by popular vote. It had previously been a simple majority.

== Use in parliamentary procedure ==
Parliamentary procedures can utilize supermajority rules to avoid the tyranny of the majority and increase political stability. Robert's Rules of Order states:

As a compromise between the rights of the individual and the rights of the assembly, the principle has been established that a two-thirds vote is required to adopt any motion that: (a) suspends or modifies a rule of order previously adopted; (b) prevents the introduction of a question for consideration; (c) closes, limits, or extends the limits of debate; (d) closes nominations or the polls, or otherwise limits the freedom of nominating or voting; or (e) takes away membership.

Supermajority rules can contribute to gridlock and cause the tyranny of the supermajority. Supermajority pivot points can show higher volatility than median pivot points in case of political polarization.

== Use in governments around the world ==
=== Australia ===
To pass an amendment to the Australian Constitution, a referendum is required and must achieve a "double majority": a majority of those voting nationwide, as well as separate majorities in a majority of states (i.e., 4 out of 6 states). Furthermore, in circumstances where a specific state is affected by a referendum, a majority of voters in that state must also agree to the change—referred to as a "triple majority".

=== Bangladesh ===
Article 142 of the Constitution of Bangladesh stipulates a bill in the Jatiya Sangsad must expressly state in its short title its purpose is to amend a provision of the constitution. Constitutional amendments require a two-thirds majority in the unicameral Jatiya Sangsad to become effective.

=== Canada ===
In Canada, most constitutional amendments can be passed only if identical resolutions are adopted by the House of Commons, the Senate, and two-thirds or more of the provincial legislative assemblies representing at least 50 percent of the national population.

=== Czech Republic ===
Any change of Constitution of the Czech Republic or any other Constitutional act of the Czech Republic require a 3/5 majority of all Deputies in Chamber of Deputies and 3/5 of Senators present. Same supermajority is needed for ratification of the international treaty that transfers part of state sovereignty to some international organization. Same majorities apply for start of impeachment procedure of the President of the republic. Majority of all members in both chambers are needed for: declaration of war, deployment of Czech armed forces outside Czech republic, approval of foreign armed forces movement inside of the country, or for approval of Czech republic membership in defensive international organization.

Chamber of Deputies can order its own dissolution by 3/5 vote of all deputies.

=== Denmark ===
Article 20 of the Constitution of Denmark states that if the government or parliament wants to cede parts of national sovereignty to an international body such as the European Union or the United Nations, it has to get a five-sixths majority in the Folketing (150 out of 179 seats). If there is only a simple majority, a referendum must be held on the subject.

=== European Union ===
==== Council ====
The Council of the European Union uses 'Qualified majority voting' for the majority of issues brought before the institution. However, for matters of extreme importance for individual member states, unanimous voting is implemented. An example of this is Article 7 of the Treaty on European Union, whereby a member state can have its rights suspended with the unanimous approval of all other member states.

After the accession of Croatia, on 1 July 2013, at least 260 votes out of a total of 352 by at least 15 member states were required for legislation to be adopted by qualified majority. From 1 July 2013, the pass condition translated into:

1. At least 15 (or 18, if proposal was not made by the commission) countries,
2. At least 260 of the total 352 voting weights,
3. At least 313.6 million people represented by the states that vote in favour.

==== Parliament ====
Requirements to reach an absolute majority is a common feature of voting in the European Parliament (EP) where under the ordinary legislative procedure the EP is required to act by an absolute majority if it is to either amend or reject proposed legislation.

=== Finland ===
According to Finnish Law, when a new legislative proposal would in some way add, alter or remove a part of the Finnish constitution, a bill requires a 2/3 majority approval (or 134 out of 200 representatives) in the Parliament of Finland. The voting takes place in the first session after the parliamentary elections following the original proposal. Alternatively, the proposition may be declared urgent, in which case the voting takes place before the next elections, requiring an approval of a 5/6 majority.

=== India ===
Article 368 of the Indian Constitution requires a supermajority of two-thirds of members present and voting in each house of the Indian Parliament, subject to at least by a majority of the total membership of each House of Parliament, to amend the constitution. In addition, in matters affecting the states and judiciary, at least above half of all the states need to ratify the amendment.

=== Italy ===
The President of Italy is elected by an electoral college consisting of both chambers of Parliament sitting in joint session with 58 electors from the country's 20 regions. In the first three rounds of voting, a candidate must get two-thirds of the votes to win, but from the fourth round onwards only an absolute majority is needed. Reforms to the Constitution need to achieve a supermajority of two-thirds of the votes both in the Chamber and in the Senate to avoid the possibility of being sent to popular vote in order to be confirmed through a referendum.

=== Japan ===
Amendments to the constitution require a two-thirds majority in both houses of the National Diet and a simple majority in a referendum.

=== New Zealand ===
Section 268 of the Electoral Act sets out a number of 'reserved provisions'. These provisions include section 17(1) of the Constitution Act 1986 (regarding Parliament's term length), section 35 of the Electoral Act (regarding the drawing of electoral boundaries), and section 74 of the Electoral Act (designating 18 as the minimum voting age). For a 'reserved provision' to be amended or repealed, a three-quarters majority is required in the House of Representatives or a majority is needed in a national referendum.

=== Nigeria ===
Under the Constitution of Nigeria a two-thirds majority is required in the National Assembly to alter the Constitution, enact legislation in a few areas, or remove office holders from some positions, such as Speaker. Legislative override or impeachment of the executive at either the state or federal government level also requires a two-thirds majority of the corresponding legislative assembly.

=== Philippines ===
Under the 1987 Constitution of the Philippines, a two-thirds majority of both chambers of the Congress of the Philippines (the House of Representatives and the Senate) meeting in joint session is required to declare war. A two-thirds majority of both chambers is required to override a presidential veto. A two-thirds vote of both chambers of Congress voting separately is required to designate the vice president as acting president in the event that a majority of the Cabinet certifies that the president is "unable to discharge the powers and duties of his office" but the president declares that no such inability exists. A two-thirds vote of either chamber is required to suspend or expel a member from that chamber.

Under the 1987 Constitution, "The Congress may, by a vote of two-thirds of all its Members, call a constitutional convention, or by a majority vote of all its Members, submit to the electorate the question of calling such a convention." A three-quarters vote of all the members of the Congress is required to propose an amendment to the Constitution; the proposed amendment is submitted to the people for ratification (by a majority of the votes cast) in a plebiscite.

A two-thirds majority of the Senate is required to ratify treaties, and to remove an impeached official from office. Impeachment by the House, which is the required first step in the removal process, only requires one-third of Representatives to sign a petition (specifically a verified complaint or resolution of impeachment).

=== Poland ===
To amend the Constitution the Sejm need to approve the change with at least two-thirds majority of votes in the presence of at least half of all Deputies, and then by the Senate by an absolute majority of votes in the presence of at least half of all Senators. If requested by at least one fifth of legally defined number of the Deputies, the Senate, or the president, changes of the chapters 1, 2 and 12 of the Constitution have to be approved by majority of participating voters in referendum. For ratification of the international treaty that transfers part of state sovereignty to some international organization two-thirds majority of votes in the presence of at least half of all Sejm Deputies and two-thirds majority of votes in the presence of at least half of all Senators is needed.

Sejm can order its own dissolution by two-thirds vote majority of all deputies (Senate is then also automatically dissolved).

The president may return the bill to the Sejm in a standard package veto, the Sejm can override the bill by a three-fifths majority of members present (at least half of all members have to be present).

=== Singapore ===
Different amendment procedures apply to different parts of the Constitution. Most of the Articles of the Constitution may be amended by a bill enacted by Parliament if there is at least a supermajority of two-thirds of all elected MPs voting in favour of the bill during its Second and Third Readings in Parliament. This is in contrast to ordinary bills, which only need to be approved by at least a simple majority of all the MPs present and voting.

However, the ruling People's Action Party (PAP) has commanded a majority of more than two-thirds of the seats in Parliament since 1968. Thus, the more stringent amendment requirement has not imposed any major limitation on Parliament's ability to amend the Constitution.

=== South Korea ===
==== Legislation ====
A three-fifths majority of legislators is required for a bill to be put to a vote in the National Assembly in order to prevent the ruling party from passing laws without the support of opposition parties. However, if a bill does not achieve the required three-fifths majority at one session without also being rejected, it must then be voted on at the next session even if less than three-fifths of legislators agree to do so. Additionally, if the President vetoes a bill, the veto can be overridden by a two-thirds vote in congress, provided that an absolute majority of legislators are in attendance.

==== Impeachment ====
According to Article 65 of the Constitution of South Korea, impeachment of the President requires a two-third majority of legislators to be effective.

==== Judicial review ====
According to Article 113 of the Constitution of South Korea, the Constitutional Court requires a two-thirds majority of its judges to issue rulings nullifying laws, removing impeached officials or dissolving a political party.

==== Constitutional amendments ====
According to Article 130 of the Constitution of South Korea, amendments to the constitution must be passed by a two-thirds majority of legislators and then approved by voters at a referendum in order to become effective.

=== Spain ===
==== Constitutional reform ====
The 1978 Constitution states that a three-fifths majority in both Congress of Deputies and Senate of Spain is needed to pass a constitutional reform, but if a two-thirds majority is reached in the Congress of Deputies, an absolute majority of senators is enough to pass the proposal.

Nevertheless, when a new Constitution is proposed or the proposal's goal is to reform the Preliminary Title, the Chapter on Fundamental Rights and Freedoms or the Title on the Crown, the supermajority becomes significantly harder:

- A supermajority of two-thirds must be reached in both Congress of Deputies and Senate.
- Both chambers must be dissolved.
- The new elected chambers must approve the proposal by a new two-thirds supermajority.
- Finally, the proposal is passed by majority in referendum.

The first way has been used twice (1992 and 2011), but the second has never been used.

==== Other legal procedures ====
The Spanish Constitution states other supermajorities:

- Members of the General Council of the Judiciary are appointed by the Congress of Deputies and Senate of Spain, and each appointment needs a three-fifths majority.
- Members of the Constitutional Court are also appointed by both Congress of Deputies and Senate of Spain, and each appointment needs a three-fifths majority.
- The president of the RTVE, the public radio and television broadcaster, must be elected by two-thirds majority of the Congress of Deputies.

==== Autonomous communities ====
Each Spanish autonomous community has its own Statute of Autonomy, working like a local constitution that is subject to the 1978 Constitution and national powers.

The Statute of Autonomy of the Canary Islands states that its economic and fiscal regime and electoral law need a two-thirds majority of the Parliament to be modified. On its behalf, the Ombudsman needs a three-fifths majority to be appointed. Also, if a two-thirds majority votes against a law project, it must be proposed to the following session.

=== Taiwan ===
Before the Additional Articles of the Constitution of the Republic of China in 2005, constitutional amendments needed to be passed by the National Assembly. Since the Additional Articles were ratified on June 7, 2005, the National Assembly was abolished. Amendments of the constitution need to be proposed by more than one-quarter of members of the Legislative Yuan, passed by three-quarters of those present in the meeting, the presence of which must surpass three-quarters of all members of the Legislative Yuan, followed by the approval of more than half (50%) of all eligible voters in a referendum.

=== Turkey ===
In Turkey, constitutional amendments need a three fifths majority (360 votes) to be put forward to a referendum and a two-thirds majority (400 votes) to be ratified directly.

=== Ukraine ===
==== Legislative veto ====
The president of Ukraine may refuse to sign a bill and return it to the Verkhovna Rada with proposed amendments. The Verkhovna Rada may override a veto by a two-thirds majority.

==== Constitutional amendments ====
According to Article 155 of the Constitution of Ukraine, amendments to the constitution, except for Chapter I — "General Principles," Chapter III — "Elections. Referendum", and Chapter XIII — "Introducing Amendments to the Constitution of Ukraine", must be previously approved by a simple majority of the constitutional composition of the Verkhovna Rada of Ukraine and then passed by a two-thirds majority of the constitutional composition of the Verkhovna Rada of Ukraine at the succeeding regular session of the Verkhovna Rada of Ukraine.

According to Article 156 of the Constitution of Ukraine, amendments to Chapter I — "General Principles," Chapter III — "Elections. Referendum", and Chapter XIII — "Introducing Amendments to the Constitution of Ukraine" must be passed by a two-thirds majority of the constitutional composition of the Verkhovna Rada of Ukraine and then approved by voters at a referendum in order to become effective.

=== United Kingdom ===
==== UK Parliament ====
A rare example of a supermajority requirement affecting the Parliament of the United Kingdom is the need for a two-thirds supermajority vote in both the House of Commons and the House of Lords to amend or dissolve the Royal Charter on self-regulation of the press, insofar as it applies in England and Wales.

Before its repeal, the Fixed-term Parliaments Act 2011 provided that the United Kingdom House of Commons could be dissolved and an election held before the expiry of its 5-year term by a vote of two-thirds of the membership of the House of Commons. The Act also provided that Parliament could alternatively be dissolved if the House of Commons passed a motion of no-confidence in the government and no new government were to win a motion of confidence within two weeks of the original vote of no-confidence.

The two-thirds supermajority provision for an early dissolution and election was triggered only once, resulting in the 2017 United Kingdom General Election. The previous election in 2015 had occurred due to the natural expiry of the 5-year term of the House of Commons.

Parliamentary supremacy meant that theoretically the Act could be circumvented by a government with a majority that wanted to bypass the requirement for a two-thirds vote by passing an act that stated, "Notwithstanding the Fixed-term Parliaments Act 2011, a general election will be called on DATE". This was precisely what was done to initiate the election in 2019, the final election held whilst the Fixed-term Parliaments Act was in effect.

During the 2019 election, both the governing Conservative Party and the opposition Labour Party expressed a desire to repeal the Fixed-term Parliaments Act and restore the traditional, centuries-old system under which elections could be held at any time, subject to the 5-year maximum term limit established by the Parliament Act 1911. Such a repeal would only require a simple majority.

Ultimately, the Fixed-term Parliaments Act was repealed by the Dissolution and Calling of Parliament Act 2022, thereby removing any supermajority requirement and restoring the previous royal prerogative power to dissolve the House of Commons at any time during its 5-year term.

==== Devolved parliaments ====
The devolved legislatures in Northern Ireland, Scotland and Wales all usually operate with fixed intervals between ordinary elections. However, the acts governing the operation of those legislatures all allow for an early election to take place if a motion to that effect is approved by two-thirds of the total number of members of the legislature in question.

Section 31A of the Scotland Act 1998 and Section 111A of the Government of Wales Act 2006 provide that certain provisions of those Acts relating to the functions of and elections to the respective Scottish and Welsh devolved legislatures are protected from amendment by those legislatures, unless a two-thirds supermajority of the total number of members votes in favour.

Regarding Scotland, the protected provisions are:

- Who may vote at Scottish Parliament elections
- The system of election for members of the Scottish Parliament
- The number of Scottish Parliament constituencies
- The number of members returned by each constituency

The protected provisions regarding Wales are the same as those in Scotland; in addition, there are two Wales-specific provisions:

- The name of the legislature
- The number of individuals permitted to be appointed Welsh Minister or Deputy Welsh Minister

A two-thirds supermajority vote is required in the Scottish Parliament in order to amend or dissolve the Royal Charter on self-regulation of the press, insofar as it applies in Scotland.

==== Local authorities ====
Principal councils in Wales are required to pass a resolution with a two-thirds supermajority vote in order to change the system by which they are elected, with the permitted choices being first-past-the-post and single transferable vote.

District councils in England are required to pass a resolution with a two-thirds supermajority vote in order to change their 'electoral scheme,' i.e. what proportion of councillors is elected at each ordinary election, with permitted proportions being one-third, one-half or all councillors.

The London Assembly may, by a two-thirds supermajority vote, veto the mayor's draft strategies.

=== United Nations ===
The United Nations Security Council requires a supermajority of the fixed membership on all matters. According to Article 27 of the United Nations Charter, at least nine of the Security Council's 15 members (i.e., a three-fifths supermajority) must vote in favor of a draft resolution in order to achieve passage. Furthermore, on a substantive resolution, none of the permanent members (the People's Republic of China, France, the Russian Federation, the United Kingdom, and the United States) can vote against the proposal, otherwise it fails, effectively giving them a veto which cannot be overridden. Abstentions do not count as votes against, allowing permanent members to express disapproval on a substantive resolution without vetoing it by abstaining from the vote. However, since the supermajority for passage specifies the votes must be for a resolution, abstentions and absences could be considered negative votes if the number of affirmative votes is below nine.

The United Nations General Assembly requires a supermajority of those present and voting on "very important questions" such as admitting new member-states to the United Nations. According to Article 18 of the Charter, this means two-thirds of votes cast must favor a resolution for it to be adopted. This means that abstentions and absences have no effect on a resolution provided the quorum is met. On all other votes in the United Nations System are done by simple majority of those present.

=== United States ===
==== Federal government ====
The Constitution of the United States requires supermajorities for certain significant actions to occur.

Amendments to the Constitution may be proposed in one of two ways: a two-thirds supermajority votes of each body of United States Congress or a convention called by Congress on application of two-thirds (currently 34) of the states. Once proposed, the amendment must be ratified by three-quarters (currently 38) of the states (either through the state legislatures, or ratification conventions, whichever "mode of ratification" Congress selects).

Congress may pass bills by simple majority votes. If the president vetoes a bill, Congress may override the veto by a two-thirds supermajority of both houses.

A treaty must be ratified by a two-thirds supermajority of the Senate to enter into force and effect.

Section 4 of the Twenty-fifth Amendment to the United States Constitution gives Congress a role to play in the event of a presidential disability. If the vice president and a majority of the president's cabinet declare that the president is unable to serve in that role, the vice president becomes acting president. Within 21 days of such a declaration (or, if Congress is in recess when a president is disabled, 21 days after Congress reconvenes), Congress must vote by two-thirds supermajorities to continue the disability declaration; otherwise, such declaration expires after the 21 days and the president would at that time "resume" discharging all the powers and duties of the office. As of October 2026, Section 4 has never been invoked.

The House may, by a simple majority vote, impeach a federal official (such as, but not limited to, the president, vice president, or a federal judge). Removal from office requires a two-thirds supermajority of the Senate. In 1842, the House failed to impeach president John Tyler. In 1868, the Senate fell one vote short of removing president Andrew Johnson following his impeachment. In 1999, efforts to remove Bill Clinton following his impeachment in 1998 fell just short of a simple majority, and 17 votes short of the two-thirds supermajority. The impeachment procedure was last used in 2021, when president Donald Trump was impeached for a second time during his first term and subsequently acquitted with 57 senators voting guilty and 43 not guilty, falling 10 votes short of conviction. Each chamber may expel one of its own members by a two-thirds supermajority vote; this last happened when the House expelled George Santos in 2023.

The 14th Amendment (section 3) bars a person from federal or state office if, after having previously taken an oath to support the Constitution as a federal or state officer, "shall have engaged in insurrection or rebellion against the same, or given aid or comfort to the enemies thereof". However, both the House and Senate may jointly override this restriction with a two-thirds supermajority vote each.

A two-thirds supermajority in the Senate is 67 out of 100 senators, while a two-thirds supermajority in the House is 290 out of 435 representatives. However, since many votes take place without every seat in the House filled and representatives participating, it does not often require 67 senators or 290 representatives to achieve this supermajority.

Apart from these constitutional requirements, a Senate rule (except in cases covered by the nuclear option, or of a rule change) requires an absolute supermajority of three-fifths to move to a vote through a cloture motion, which closes debate on a bill or nomination, thus ending a filibuster by a minority of members. In current practice, the mere threat of a filibuster prevents passing almost any measure that has less than three-fifths agreement in the Senate, 60 of the 100 senators if every seat is filled.

==== State government ====
Governor legislative veto override majority required: majority of all members 3/5 majority of members present 3/5 majority of all members 2/3 majority of members present 2/3 majority of all members 2/3 majority of all legislature members combined

Supermajority needed to raise taxes

For state legislatures in the United States, Mason's Manual says, "A deliberative body cannot by its own act or rule require a two-thirds vote to take any action where the constitution or controlling authority requires only a majority vote. To require a two-thirds vote, for example, to take any action would be to give to any number more than one-third of the members the power to defeat the action and amount to a delegation of the powers of the body to a minority." Some states require a supermajority for passage of a constitutional amendment or statutory initiative.

Many state constitutions allow or require amendments to their own constitutions to be proposed by supermajorities of the state legislature; these amendments must usually be approved by the voters at one or more subsequent elections. Michigan, for instance, allows the Legislature to propose an amendment to the Michigan Constitution; it must then be ratified by the voters at the next general election (unless a special election is called).

In most states, the state legislature may override a governor's veto of legislation. In most states, a two-thirds supermajority of both chambers is required (of all members or present). However, in some states (e.g., Delaware, Illinois, Kansas, Maryland, North Carolina and Rhode Island), only a three-fifths supermajority is required (of all members or present). Some of the states mainly east of the Mississippi River like Alabama, Kentucky and West Virginia only a normal majority of all members is needed.

One common provision of so-called "taxpayer bill of rights" laws (either in state statutes or state constitutions) is requirement of a supermajority vote in the state legislature to increase taxes. The National Conference of State Legislatures reported in 2010 that fifteen states required a supermajority vote (either a three-fifths, two-thirds or three-quarters majority vote in both chambers) to pass some or all tax increases.

== International agreements ==
The Rome Statute of the International Criminal Court requires a seven-eighths majority of participating states to be amended.

== See also ==
- Byzantine Fault Tolerance (mathematical proof for 2/3 consensus threshold)
- Consensus decision-making
- Double majority
- Group decision-making
- Minoritarianism
- Unanimity
- Voting in the Council of the European Union—described the "qualified majority voting" requirement in that body
