= Federal Constitution of the United Mexican States =

The following is a list of the disambiguation of the Federal Constitution of the United Mexican States

- Federal Constitution of the United Mexican States of 1824
- Federal Constitution of the United Mexican States of 1857
- Federal Constitution of the United Mexican States of 1917

== See also ==
- Constitution of Mexico
- Federal Constitution (disambiguation)
