= Federal law (disambiguation) =

Federal law is the body of law created by the federal government of a country.

Federal law may also refer to:

- Federal Law (United States), a body of law which originates with the Constitution
- Federal Law (Russia)

== See also ==
- Federal common law, a term of United States law
- Federal Constitutional Law (disambiguation)
- Federation#Federal governments
