= Daniela Drtinová =

Czech TV presenter and journalist (born 1970)

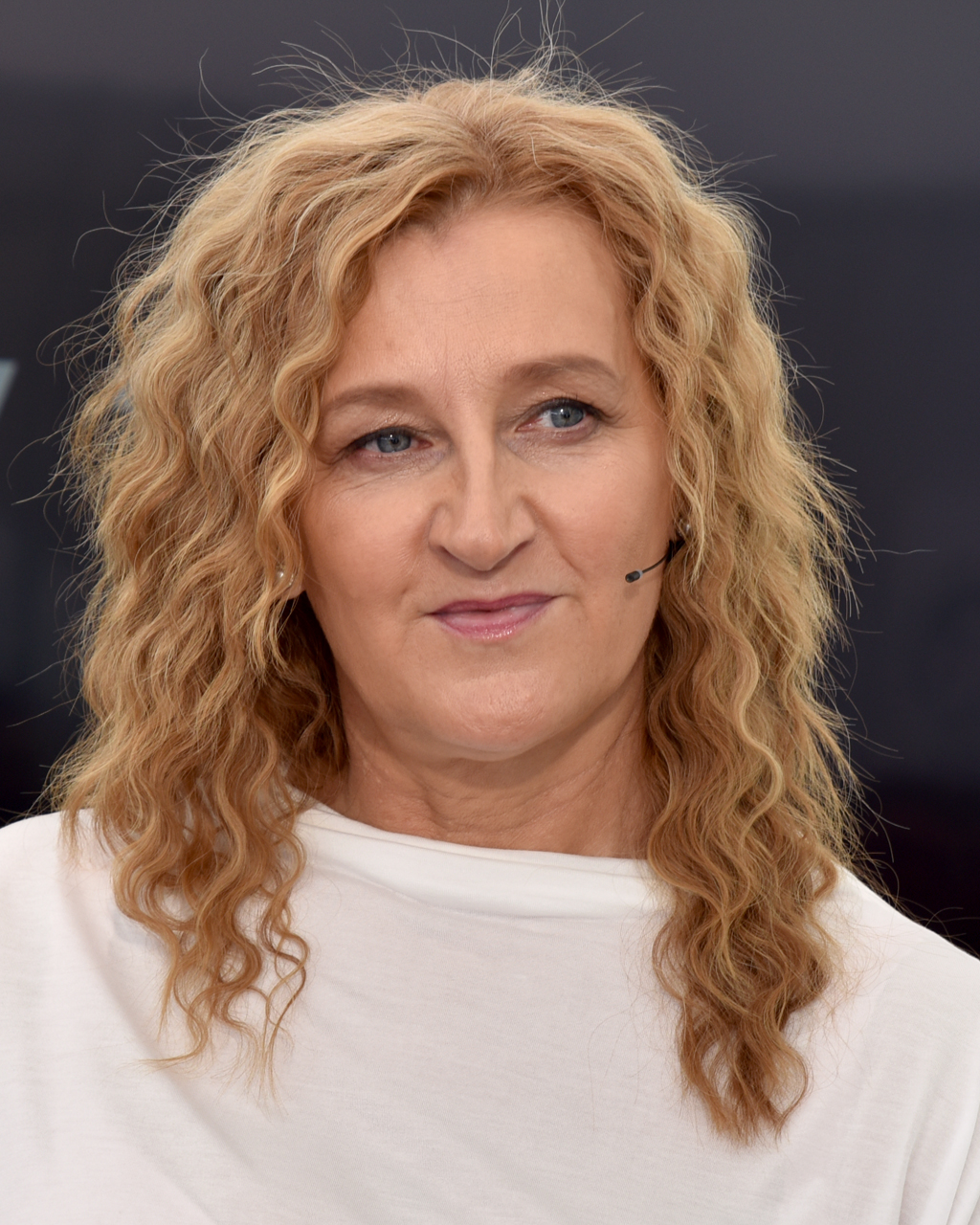
- Drtinová in 2022
- Born: 1 July 1970 (age 56); Olomouc, Czechoslovakia
- Occupations: TV presenter, journalist

Daniela Drtinová (born 1 July 1970) is a Czech TV presenter and journalist. She focuses primarily on news broadcasting and moderating interviews. From 1993 to 2014, she worked for Czech Television, where she hosted several programs.

== Early life and education ==
Daniela Drtinová was born in Olomouc on 1 July 1970. She has two siblings. In 1989, she went to Prague and studied at the Faculty of Law, Charles University, where she obtained the JUDr. title in 1993. In 1997, she completed her postgraduate studies in law and obtained the Ph.D. title.

== Career ==
Her first employer was the Arteria news agency. In 1993, she started working for Czech Television, where they needed someone who could write about the laws that were rapidly emerging at that time (after the dissolution of Czechoslovakia), so she was a parliamentary correspondent from 1993 to 2001. After that, she moderated various programs, including Události, komentáře and Interview ČT24 on the ČT24 channel. In 2014, she left Czech Television and co-founded the online news television station DVTV.

In 2020, Drtinová published the book Jako bych žila dva životy ("It is like I am living two lives"), which was written as an interview by its author Milan Ohniska with Drtinová.

== Awards ==
In 2001, Drtinová received the Karel Havlíček Borovský Award for her journalistic work. It is awarded annually to the author of socially exceptionally beneficial texts.

In 2013, she won the award Novinářská cena in the category of best audiovisual interview of the year for her interview with politician Michal Hašek.

Her DVTV station has won many Křišťálová Lupa awards (eleven as of 2020; primarily in the News category and Popularity category), which honors Czech Internet services and projects.

== Personal life ==
Drtinová lives in Prague. She is Roman Catholic and has a daughter (born 2002).
