= Constitutional law (disambiguation) =

Constitutional law is a body of law which defines the role, powers, and structure of different entities within a state.

Constitutional Law may also refer to:

- International constitutional law
- Constitutional theory

== National constitutional laws ==
- Federal Constitutional Law (Austria)
- Australian constitutional law
- Canadian constitutional law
- Constitutional laws of Italy, an Act of Parliament that has the same strength as the Constitution of Italy
- French constitutional law of 23 July 2008
- Indian constitutional law
- South African constitutional law
- United Kingdom constitutional law
- United States constitutional law

== See also ==
- List of national constitutions
- Federal constitutional law (disambiguation)
- Constitution Act (disambiguation)
