= 2024 Freedom and Direct Democracy leadership election =

Czech political party leadership election

- 13 April 2024
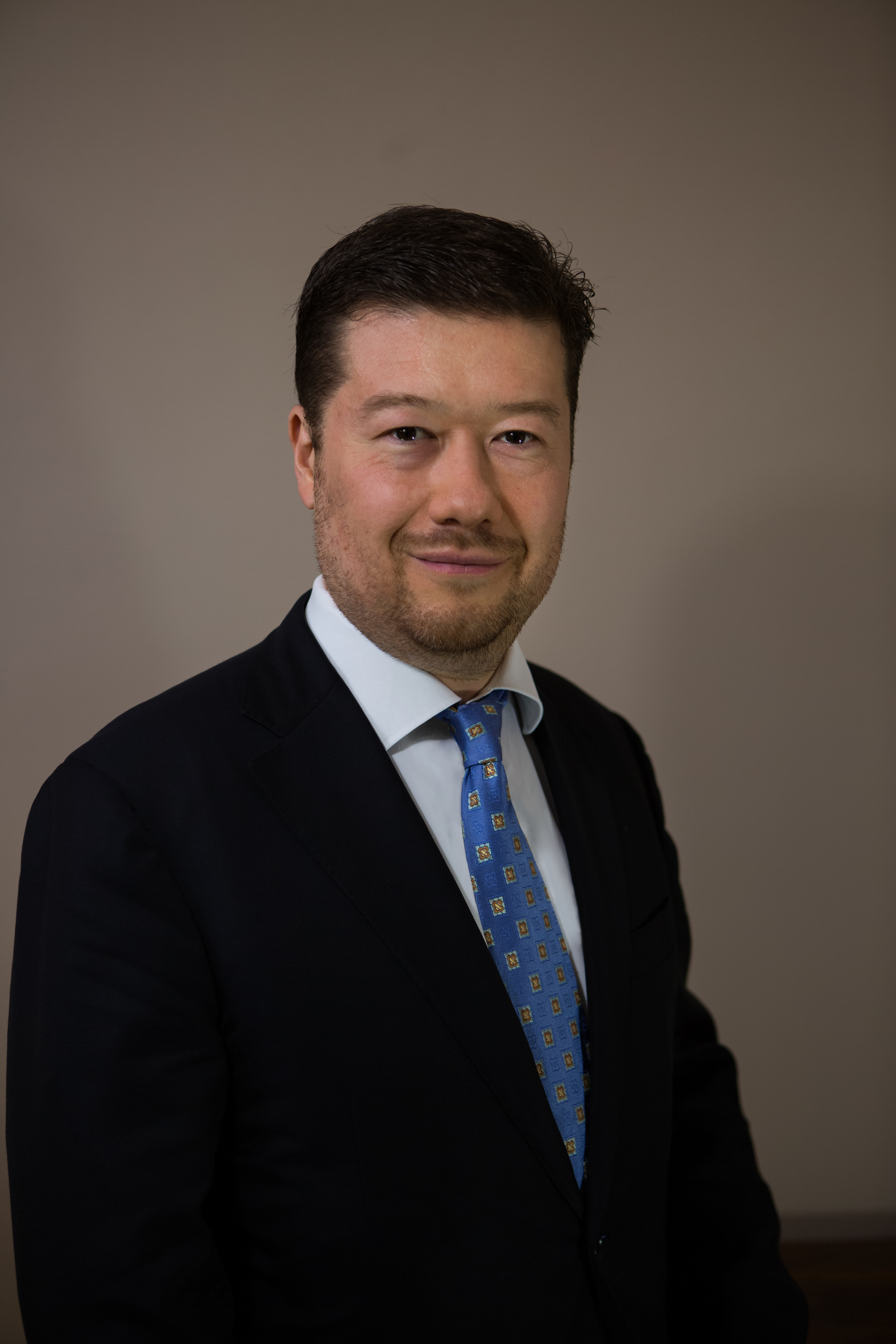
Candidate	Tomio Okamura
Electoral vote	195
Percentage	90.3%
leader of SPD before election
Tomio Okamura
Elected leader of SPD
Tomio Okamura

The Freedom and Direct Democracy (SPD) leadership election of 2024 was held on 13 April 2024. Tomio Okamura was elected for fourth term.

== Background ==
Tomio Okamura founded the party in 2015 after he split from Dawn. He was elected party's leader the same year. Okamura led the party during 2021 legislative election during which it received 9.5% and 20 seats of 200. Leadership election was scheduled for 13 April 2024. Tomio Okamura announced he will seek reelection.

== Voting ==
Voting is held in DUO Hotel. 250 delegates are allowed to vote. 223 delegates eventually participated, 216 of them voted. Okamura received 195 votes and thus was reelected.

Okamura 90.28% vote share was his lowest vote share in a leadership election.

Candidate	Vote	%
Tomio Okamura	195	90.28%
Against	20	9.26
Invalid	1	0.46%
