= Federal constitutional law =

Federal Constitutional Law is the core of the Austrian Constitution.

Federal Constitutional Law may also refer to:

- German constitutional law, a body of law dealing with Germany's constitution and institutions
- Federal Constitutional Law (Russia), a body of law enacted in important areas of constitutional law

== See also ==
- Constitutional law (disambiguation)
- Federal law (disambiguation)
