= Jiří Drtina =

Czech ice hockey player

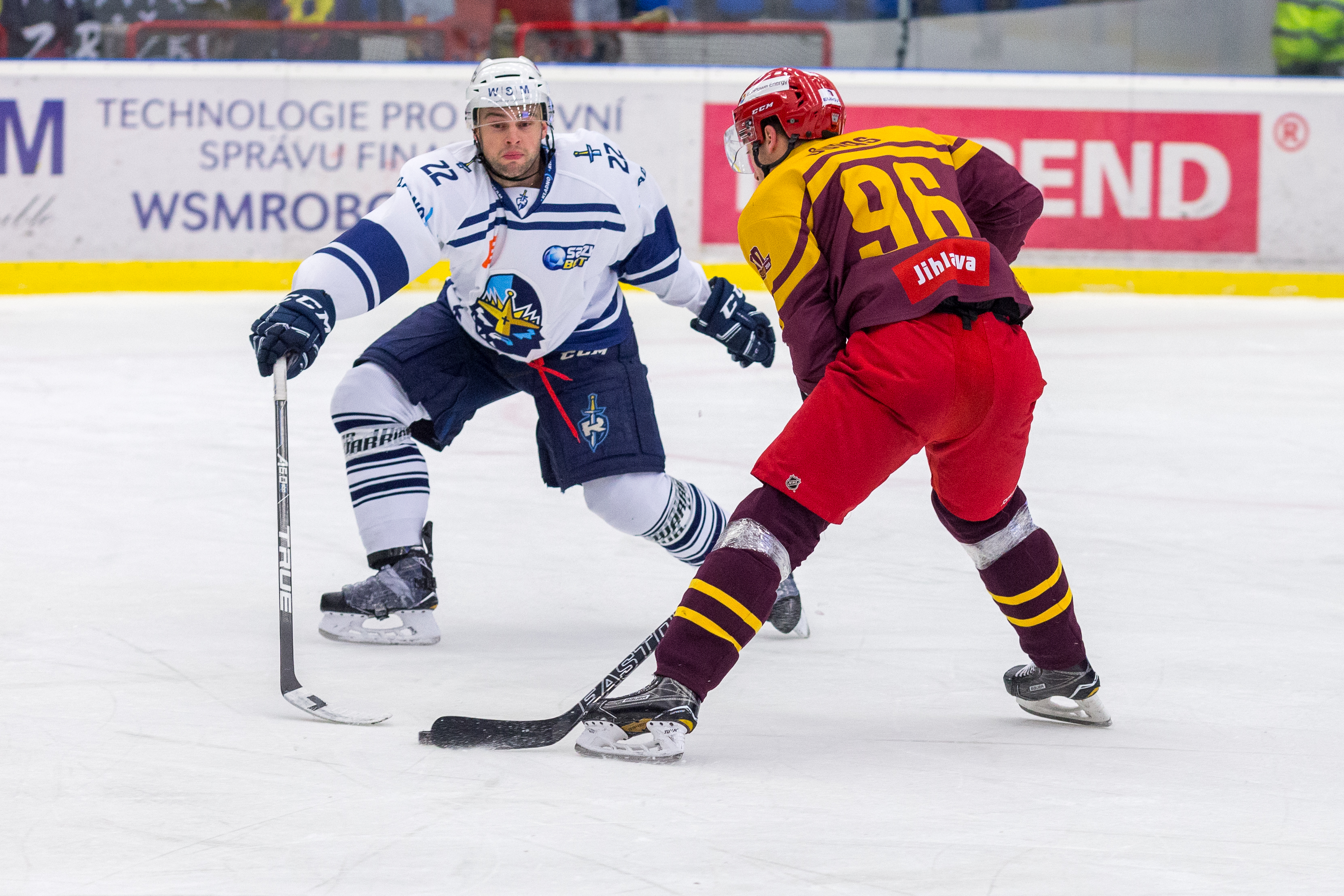
- Born: March 1, 1985 (age 41) Prague, Czechoslovakia
- Height: 5 ft 11 in (180 cm)
- Weight: 185 lb (84 kg; 13 st 3 lb)
- Position: Defence
- Shoots: Left
- Czech Extraliga team: HC Kladno
- Playing career: 2004–present

Jiří Drtina (born March 1, 1985, in Prague) is a Czech professional ice hockey defenceman. He played with HC Kladno in the Czech Extraliga during the 2010–11 Czech Extraliga season.
