= Constitutional act of the Czech Republic =

A constitutional act, with respect to the laws of the Czech Republic, is an act which can change the Constitution of the Czech Republic, provisions of the Charter of Fundamental Rights and Basic Freedoms, the conditions under which the citizenry may exercise state power directly, or the exterior or interior frontiers of the territory of the Czech Republic.

Passage of such an act can only be accomplished through the agreement of 3/5 of all Deputies and Senators present at the time the proposed act is laid before each house of Parliament. It is the only type of legislation which does not require the signature of the President to become law. Furthermore, it is the only type of legislation which the President cannot veto.

A number of constitutional acts were required for the Czech government to function in its first year of existence. However, those had no lasting impact upon the constitution itself, and may, in hindsight, be regarded as "votes which required 3/5 majorities". For instance, the Provisional Senate of 1992 was "constituted in a manner defined by a Constitutional Act", but that act is not binding upon the Senate today.

== Specific acts ==
As of 2008, only six constitutional acts have been passed which have truly changed the nature of the constitution. They have mostly been the result of implications in the original wording of the constitution that Parliament should pass constitutional acts on various subjects.

=== Number 347/1997 ===
Article 100 of the constitution provided that "higher self-governing regions may be created or dissolved only by a constitutional act". Parliament thus moved on 3 December 1997 to create 14 such regions. This required the act to rewrite Article 99 and repeal Article 103 of the constitution, so as to set the regions as being of higher authority than municipalities. Given the administrative burden of complying with the act, however, it did not come into effect until 1 January 2000.

=== Number 110/1998 ===
On 22 April 1998, Parliament opted to pass a constitutional act that was not directly implied or obliged by language in the constitution. The "Constitutional Act on the Security of the Czech Republic" defined the ways in which the Republic would respond to imminent threat. It defined the obligations the constituent parts of the Republic, and even its citizenry, had towards national defense. It allowed for compulsory military service to be instituted by further statute, required regional governments to offer material aid to the national defense, and defined the response to a non-military state of emergency, such as an ecological or industrial disaster. It also set up a State Security Council, headed by the Prime Minister. Furthermore, it required, during times of imminent military threat or war, that legislative debate be shortened to just 72 hours from the time of a bill's introduction, and that the president's veto power be temporarily suspended. Finally, it allowed for up to a six-month extension of electoral terms during the time of a declared state of emergency.

=== Number 448/2001 ===
On November 27 2001, Parliament changed article 98 of the constitution where the role of the Czech National Bank is defined. Its role changed from taking care of stability of the currency to taking care of price stability. This change came into effect on January 1 2002.

=== Number 515/2002 ===
On 14 November 2002, Parliament undertook to define the nature of a public referendum on the Czech Republic's accession to the European Union. Such an act was implied in Article 10a of the original wording of the constitution, which says that the Republic may surrender a part of its powers under international treaty "unless a constitutional act provides that such ratification requires the approval obtained in a referendum." Since the constitution later specifically required the president to "call a referendum on the Czech Republic's accession to the European Union", Parliament exercised its right under Article 10 to not only formalize that there would be such a referendum, but to define the terms under which it would be held.

=== Number 319/2009 ===
On 11 September 2009 Parliament decided to add possibility of dissolving of chamber of deputies by President after 3/5 of all Deputies decided to dissolve the Chamber of Deputies before the term of election. This was done after constitutional court decided in number 318/2009 that constitutional act 195/2009 that shortened the 5th term of Chamber of Deputies was unconstitutional.

=== Number 71/2012 ===
On 8 February 2012, Parliament changed the way of the election of the President from election by deputies and senators to election by popular vote. Together with that change in article 54 came changes to articles 56 where the election process was defined, 58, 59, 62, 63, 65, 66 and 87.

=== Number 98/2013 ===
Reduction of legal immunity of deputies and senators defined in articles 27 and 86.
