= Parliament of the Czech Republic =

Legislature of the Czech Republic

Parliament of the Czech Republic Parlament České republiky

Type
- Type: Bicameral
- Houses: Senate; Chamber of Deputies

History
- Founded: 1 January 1993
- Preceded by: • Czech National Council • Federal Assembly

Leadership
- President of the Senate: Miloš Vystrčil, ODS since 20 January 2020
- President of the Chamber of Deputies: Tomio Okamura, SPD since 5 November 2025

Structure
- Seats: 281; 81 Senators; 200 Deputies
- Senate political groups: Government (Third cabinet of Andrej Babiš) (15): ANO (14) (Note: ANO (11); Independent (1); NEZ (1); Přísaha (1)); Opposition (67): ODS and TOP 09 (30) (Note: ODS (18); TOP 09 (7); Our Czechia (2); Tábor 2020 (1); ProMOST (1); Independent (1)); Mayors and Independents (18) (Note: STAN (14) (Note: Hana Žáková, Miroslav Balatka, Miroslav Plevný, Jan Sobotka, and Helena Pešatová are non-partisans, nominated by STAN.) (Note: David Smoljak is a member of STAN, nominated by a coalition of STAN, Pirates and TOP 09.); SLK (3) (Note: Zdeněk Linhart is non-partisan, nominated by STAN and SLK.); 24/7 (1)); KDU-ČSL (13) (Note: KDU-ČSL (12) (Note: Miluše Horská, Josef Klement, and Lumír Kantor are non-partisans, nominated by KDU-ČSL.); NMFM (1)); SEN 21 and Independents (5) (Note: SEN 21 (3); OK (1); Independent (1)); Non-attached (1) (Note: Independent (1))
- Chamber of Deputies political groups: Government (Third cabinet of Andrej Babiš) (107): ANO (79) (Note: ANO (75); Independent (4)); SPD (15) (Note: SPD (11); PRO (1); Svobodní (1); Tricolour (1); Independent (1)); AUTO (13) (Note: AUTO (6); Independent (7)); Opposition (93): ODS (27) (Note: ODS (26); Independent (1)); STAN (22) (Note: STAN (20); SLK (2)); Pirates (18) (Note: Pirates (16); Greens (2)); KDU-ČSL (16); TOP 09 (9); Non-attached (1) (Note: David Pražák was a member of ANO until October 2026.)

Elections
- Senate voting system: Two-round system
- Chamber of Deputies voting system: Proportional representation
- Last Senate election: 9–10 and 16–17 October 2026
- Last Chamber of Deputies election: 3–4 October 2025

Meeting place
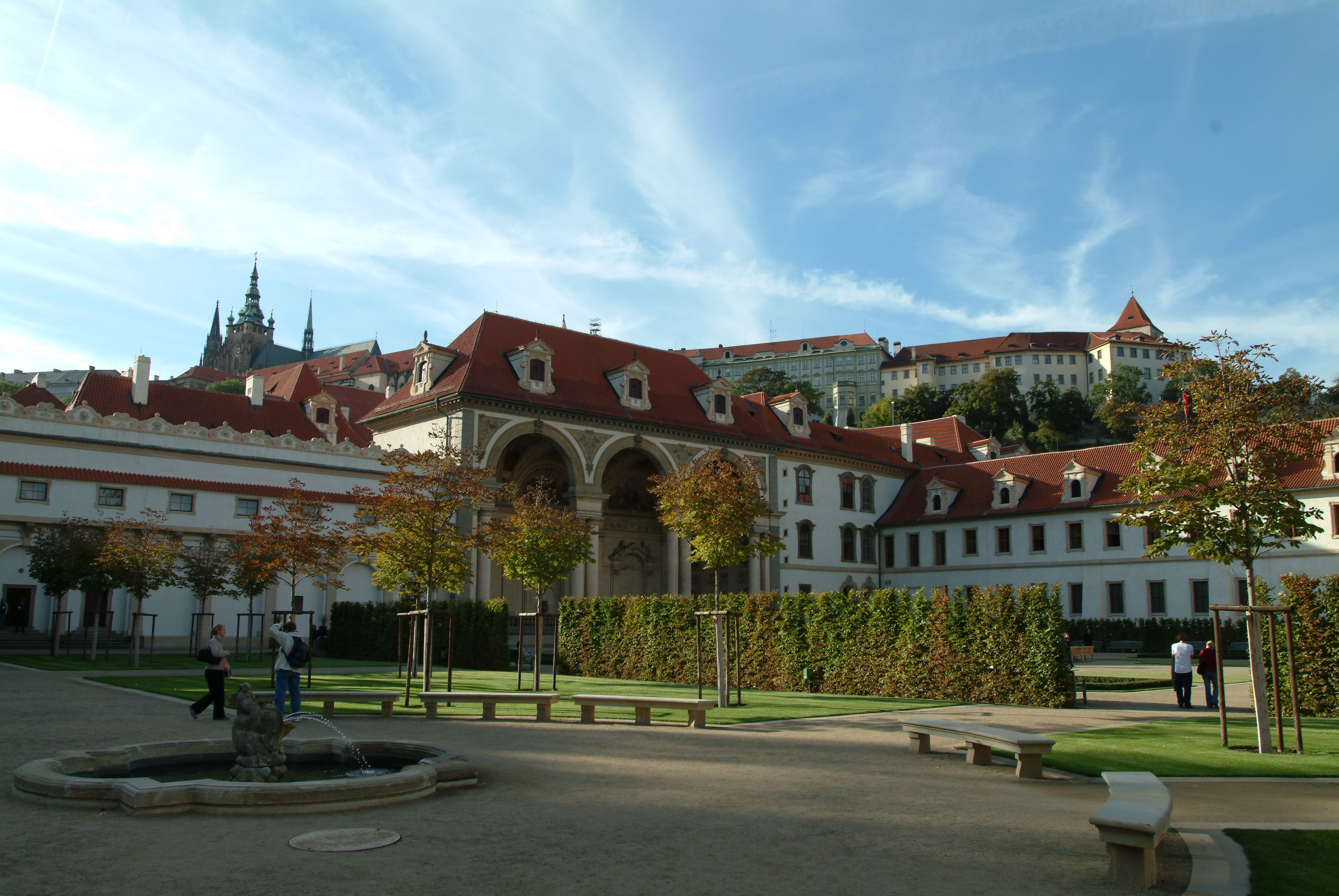
- Wallenstein Palace, meeting place of the Senate
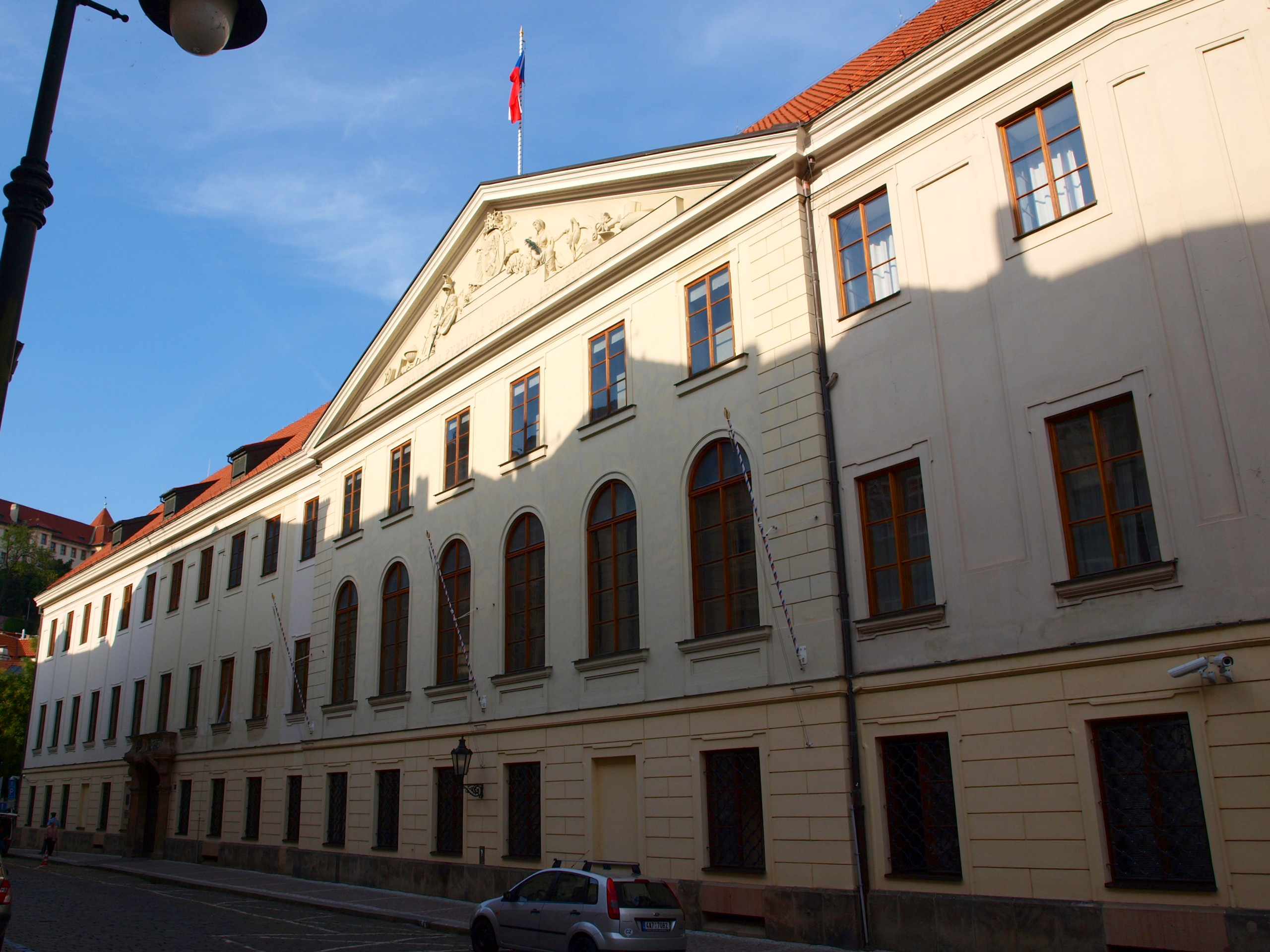
- Thun Palace, meeting place of the Chamber of Deputies

Website
- Senate; Chamber of Deputies

The Parliament of the Czech Republic (Czech: Parlament České republiky) is the legislative branch of the Czech Republic. It meets in Malá Strana, Prague and is composed of 281 total members and Senators.

It consists of two chambers, both elected in direct elections:

- the Upper House: Senate
- the Lower House: Chamber of Deputies

Art. 15 of the Constitution stipulates its name as the "Parliament". The Parliament exercises competences usual in parliamentary systems: it holds and passes bills, has the right to modify the Constitution, ratifies international agreements; if necessary, it declares war, approves presence of foreign military forces in the Czech Republic or a dispatch of Czech military forces abroad.

== History ==
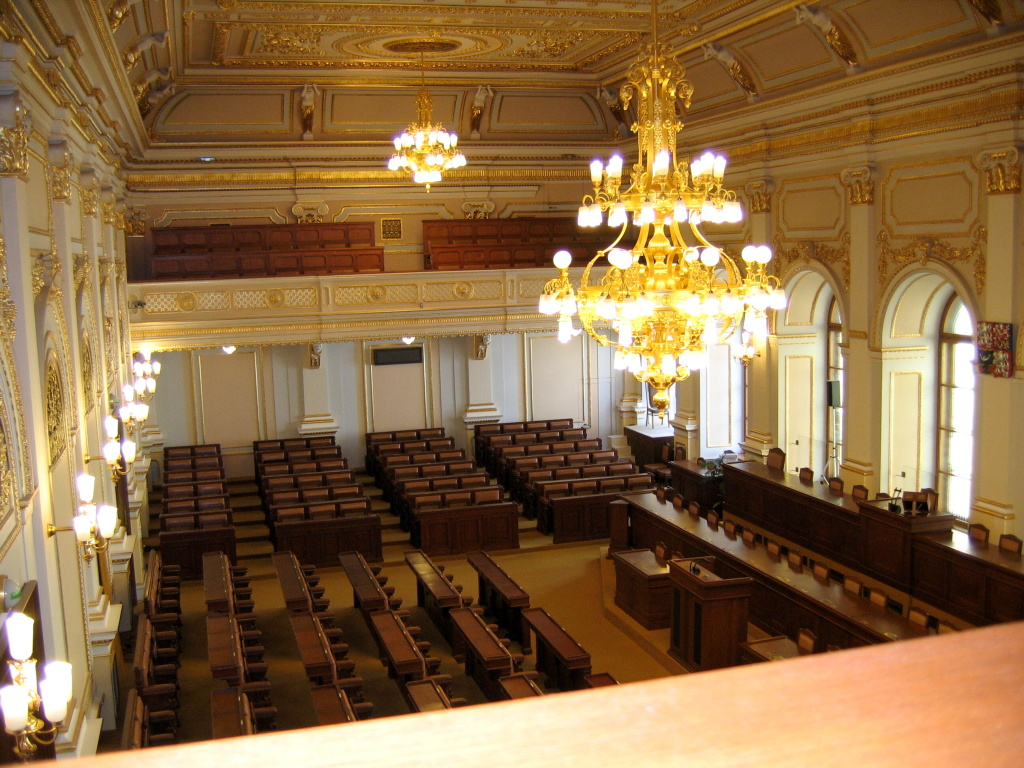
Session room of the Chamber of Deputies

The tradition of modern parliamentarianism in the Bohemian lands dates back to times of the Austrian Empire (and then Cisleithanian part of Austria-Hungary), where the Imperial Council (Reichsrat, Říšská rada) was created in 1861.

After proclamation of Czechoslovakia in 1918 its National Assembly (Národní shromáždění) undertook legislative duties both of the Imperial Council and State Diets (Bohemian, Moravian, Silesian). In 1938–39 and between 1948–89 there existed a parliament within non-democratic regimes (right-wing authoritarian or Communist regime, respectively). As a consequence of federalization of Czechoslovakia (1968), national councils of Czech and Slovak parts of the country were created.

The Chamber of Deputies keeps continuity with the Czech National Council (Česká národní rada), while the Senate was established in 1996 (with reference to the First Czechoslovak Republic one).
