= 2013 ANO 2011 leadership election =

- 2 March 2013
- Turnout: 100%
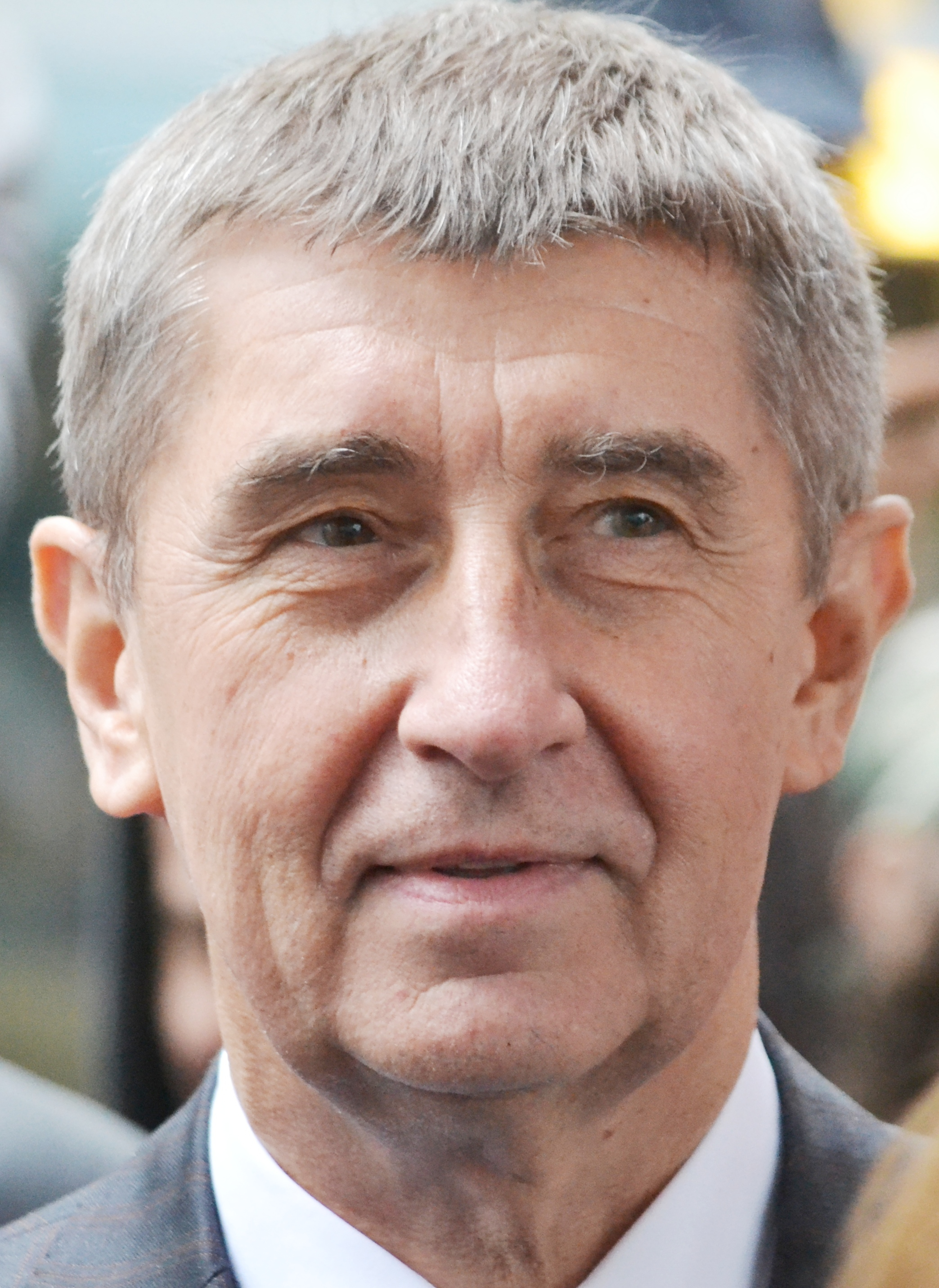
Candidate	Andrej Babiš
Electoral vote	169
Percentage	98.26%
leader of ANO 2011 before election
Andrej Babiš
Elected leader of ANO 2011
Andrej Babiš

The Czech political party ANO 2011 held a leadership election on 2 March 2013. Andrej Babiš was reelected unopposed as the party's leader. He was nominated by most regional organisations, and received 169 votes of 172.
