= Ministry of Defence (Czech Republic) =

Government ministry of the Czech Republic

Ministry of Defence of the Czech Republic
- Ministerstvo obrany České republiky
- Insignia of Ministry of Defence

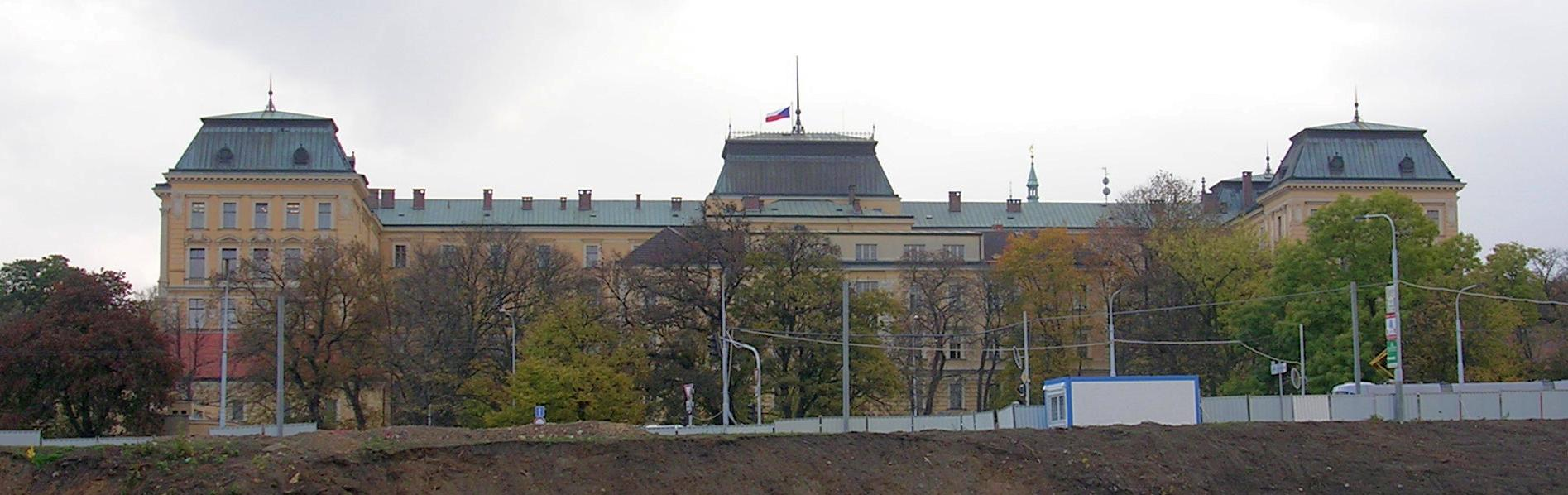
- Ministry of Defence building in Prague

Agency overview
- Formed: 8 December 1992
- Preceding agency: Czechoslovak Ministry of National Defence
- Jurisdiction: Government of the Czech Republic
- Headquarters: Tychonova 1, 160 01 Prague 6; 50°5′43.22″N 14°24′11.45″E
- Agency executive: Jaromír Zůna, Minister
- Child agencies: Military Intelligence; University of Defence
- Website: mocr.mo.gov.cz

The Ministry of Defence of the Czech Republic (Czech: Ministerstvo obrany České republiky, MO ČR) is the primary agency of the Czech Republic responsible for the planning and carrying-out of defence policy. It is the Czech Republic's ministry of defence. It is the direct successor of the Czechoslovak Ministry of Defence. Its current headquarters is located in Prague. The current minister of defence is Jaromír Zůna, who has been in office since 15 December 2025.

As of January 1, 2024, 27,826 professional soldiers were in the Ministry of Defence, of which 3988 women were in the Ministry of Defence. These figures reflect the number of members of the Army of the Czech Republic as well as soldiers operating directly in the Ministry and its subordinate organizations.

== List of ministers ==
The following people have served as ministers of defence:

No.	Portrait	Name (born–died)	Term of office			Political party	Cabinet(s)	Ref.
No.	Portrait	Name (born–died)	Took office	Left office	Time in office	Political party	Cabinet(s)	Ref.
1		Antonín Baudyš	30 December 1992	21 September 1994	1 year, 265 days	KDU-ČSL	Klaus I	
2		Vilém Holáň	22 September 1994	4 July 1996	1 year, 286 days	KDU-ČSL	Klaus I	
3		Miloslav Výborný	4 July 1996	2 January 1998	1 year, 182 days	KDU-ČSL	Klaus II	
4		Michal Lobkowicz	2 January 1998	22 July 1998	201 days	Civic Democratic Party	Tošovský	
4		Michal Lobkowicz	2 January 1998	22 July 1998	201 days	Freedom Union – Democratic Union	Tošovský	
5		Vladimír Vetchý	22 July 1998	4 May 2001	2 years, 286 days	Social Democracy	Zeman	
6		Jaroslav Tvrdík	4 May 2001	9 June 2003	2 years, 36 days	Social Democracy	Zeman	
6		Jaroslav Tvrdík	4 May 2001	9 June 2003	2 years, 36 days	Social Democracy	Špidla	
7	Miroslav Kostelka	Miroslav Kostelka	9 June 2003	4 August 2004	1 year, 56 days	Social Democracy	Špidla	
8		Karel Kühnl	4 August 2004	4 September 2006	2 years, 31 days	Freedom Union – Democratic Union	Gross	
8		Karel Kühnl	4 August 2004	4 September 2006	2 years, 31 days	Freedom Union – Democratic Union	Paroubek	
9		Jiří Šedivý	4 September 2006	9 January 2007	127 days	Independent for Civic Democratic Party	Topolánek I	
10		Vlasta Parkanová	9 January 2007	8 May 2009	2 years, 119 days	KDU-ČSL	Topolánek II	
11		Martin Barták	8 May 2009	13 July 2010	1 year, 66 days	Independent for Civic Democratic Party	Fischer	
12		Alexandr Vondra	13 July 2010	7 December 2012	2 years, 147 days	Civic Democratic Party	Nečas	
13		Karolína Peake	12 December 2012	20 December 2012	8 days	Order of the Nation	Nečas	
–		Petr Nečas acting	21 December 2012	19 March 2013	88 days	Civic Democratic Party	Nečas	
14		Vlastimil Picek	19 March 2013	29 January 2014	316 days	Independent	Nečas	
14		Vlastimil Picek	19 March 2013	29 January 2014	316 days	Independent	Rusnok	
15		Martin Stropnický	29 January 2014	13 December 2017	3 years, 318 days	ANO 2011	Sobotka	
16		Karla Šlechtová	13 December 2017	27 June 2018	196 days	Independent for ANO 2011	Babiš I	
17		Lubomír Metnar	27 June 2018	17 December 2021	3 years, 173 days	Independent for ANO 2011	Babiš II	
18		Jana Černochová	17 December 2021	15 December 2025	3 years, 363 days	Civic Democratic Party	Fiala	
19		Jaromír Zůna	15 December 2025	Incumbent	288 days	Independent for SPD	Babiš III	
