= Cabinet of Josef Tošovský =

Third government of the Czech Republic

Josef Tošovský's Cabinet
- 3rd Cabinet of Czech Republic
- 2 January - 22 July 1998
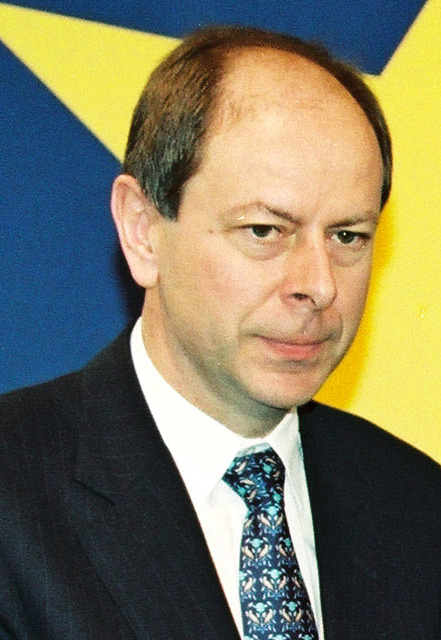
- Date formed: 2 January 1998
- Date dissolved: 22 July 1998

People and organisations
- Head of state: Václav Havel
- Head of government: Josef Tošovský
- No. of ministers: 17-18
- Member party: ODS, KDU-ČSL, ODA (at the time of formation)
- Status in legislature: Caretaker

History
- Incoming formation: 1998
- Outgoing formation: 1998
- Outgoing election: 1996 Czech legislative election
- Predecessor: Second Cabinet of Václav Klaus
- Successor: Cabinet of Miloš Zeman

The cabinet of Prime Minister Josef Tošovský was in power from 2 January to 22 July 1998. It was a caretaker government formed after fall of Václav Klaus' Second Cabinet. It led the Czech Republic until snap election in June 1998. Cabinet consisted of independents and members of Civic Democratic Party, Christian and Democratic Union – Czechoslovak People's Party and Civic Democratic Alliance. Members of the cabinet that belonged to Civic Democratic Party later formed Freedom Union.

== Government ministers ==
Portfolio	Name	Political Party
Prime Minister	Josef Tošovský	non-partisan
Deputy Prime Minister, Minister of Agriculture	Josef Lux	KDU-ČSL
Deputy Prime Minister, Minister of Foreign Affairs	Jaroslav Šedivý	non-partisan
Minister of Environment	Jiří Skalický	ODA
Minister of Environment	Martin Bursík	non-partisan
Minister for Regional Development	Jan Černý	ODS/US
Minister of Industry and Trade	Karel Kühnl	ODA
Minister of Defence	Michal Lobkowicz	ODS/US
Minister without portfolio	Vladimír Mlynář	non-partisan
Minister of Transport	Petr Moos	non-partisan
Minister of Justice	Vlasta Parkanová	ODA
Minister of Finances	Ivan Pilip	ODS/US
Minister of Health	Zuzana Roithová	non-partisan
Minister of Education, Youth and Sport	Jan Sokol	non-partisan
Minister of Culture	Martin Stropnický	non-partisan
Minister of Interior	Cyril Svoboda	KDU-ČSL
Minister of Labour and Social Affairs	Stanislav Volák	ODS/US
Minister without portfolio, head of the Government Legislative Council	Miloslav Výborný	KDU-ČSL
