= Miloslav Výborný =

Czech politician and judge

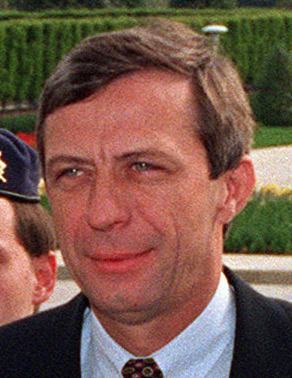

Minister of Defence
- In office 4 July 1996 – 2 January 1998
- Prime Minister: Václav Klaus
- Preceded by: Vilém Holáň
- Succeeded by: Michal Lobkowicz

Minister without portfolio
- In office 2 January 1998 – 15 July 1998
- Prime Minister: Josef Tošovský
- Preceded by: Pavel Bratinka
- Succeeded by: Jaroslav Bašta

Chairman of the Government Legislative Council
- In office 2 January 1998 – 15 July 1998
- Prime Minister: Josef Tošovský
- Preceded by: Vlasta Parkanová
- Succeeded by: Pavel Rychetský

Member of the Chamber of Deputies
- In office 1 January 1993 – 2 June 2003

Member of the Federal Assembly
- In office 7 June 1990 – 31 December 1992

Mayor of Heřmanův Městec
- In office 1998–2003

Personal details
- Born: February 19, 1952 (age 74) Chrudim, Czechoslovakia (now Czech Republic)
- Party: KDU-ČSL (?–2003)
- Education: Charles University

Miloslav Výborný (born 1952) is a Czech politician of KDU-ČSL. He was a member of the Chamber of Deputies from 1990 to after the 2002 elections, serving as defense minister from 1996. He served as a justice on the Constitutional Court of the Czech Republic from 3. 6. 2003 to 3. 6. 2013. His son, Marek Výborný, was elected leader of KDU-ČSL in 2019.
