= Václav Klaus' Cabinet =

Václav Klaus' Cabinet may refer to:

- Václav Klaus' First Cabinet
- Václav Klaus' Second Cabinet
