= September 1990 Czechoslovak People's Party leadership election =

CSL chair election

A leadership election for the Czechoslovak People's Party (ČSL) was held during extraordinary congress of the party on 29 September 1990. Josef Lux was elected the new leader.

== Candidates ==
There were 8 candidates.

- Josef Bartončík, the incumbent leader.
- Antonín Baudyš
- Jaroslav Cuhra
- Jiří Karas
- Josef Lux believed that ČSL should be a right wing Christina democratic party.
- Jan Marek, believed that ČSL should remain in opposition.
- Augustin Navrátil
- Richard Sacher

== Voting ==
Josef Bartončík and Antonín Baudyš were considered the strongest candidates. Three candidates advanced to the second round - Bartončík, Baudyš and Lux. Baudyš decided to withdraw from the election and supported Lux. Lux then defeated Bartončík and became the new leader.
