= Second cabinet of Václav Klaus =

Václav Klaus' Second Cabinet
- 2nd Cabinet of Czech Republic
- 4 July 1996 - 2 January 1998
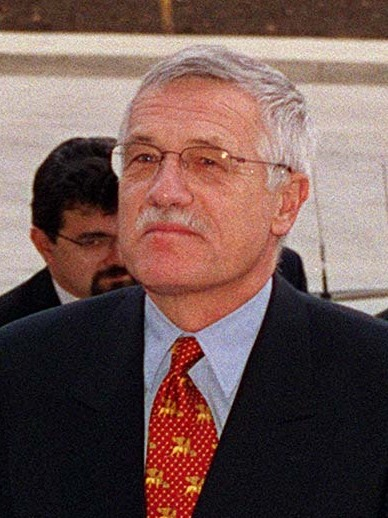
- Date formed: 4 July 1996
- Date dissolved: 2 January 1998

People and organisations
- Head of state: Václav Havel
- Head of government: Václav Klaus
- No. of ministers: 15-16
- Member party: ODS; KDU-ČSL; ODA
- Status in legislature: Minority government (Coalition)
- Opposition party: ČSSD; KSČM; SPR-RSČ
- Opposition leader: Miloš Zeman

History
- Incoming formation: 1996
- Outgoing formation: 1998
- Election: 1996 Czech legislative election
- Predecessor: First Cabinet of Václav Klaus
- Successor: Cabinet of Josef Tošovský

The second cabinet of Prime Minister Václav Klaus was in power from 4 July 1996 to 2 January 1998. It was a minority coalition government that consisted of ODS, KDU-ČSL and ODA. It was supported by ČSSD. Towards the end of 1997, cabinet resigned in connection with accusations of funding irregularities in the ODS.

== Government ministers ==
Portfolio	Image	Political Party
Prime Minister	Václav Klaus	ODS
Deputy Prime Minister	Jan Kalvoda; Jiří Skalický	ODA
Deputy Prime Minister	Ivan Kočárník	ODS
Minister of Finance	Ivan Kočárník; Ivan Pilip	ODS
Deputy Prime Minister; Minister of Agriculture	Josef Lux	KDU-ČSL
Minister of Defence	Miloslav Výborný	KDU-ČSL
Minister of Environment	Jiří Skalický	ODA
Minister of Transportation	Martin Říman	ODS
Minister of Industry and Trade	Vladimír Dlouhý; Karel Kühnl	ODA
Minister of Economic Policy and Development	Jaromír Schneider; Tomáš Kvapil	KDU-ČSL
Minister of Culture	Jaromír Talíř	KDU-ČSL
Minister of Health	Jan Stráský	ODS
Minister of Justice	Jan Kalvoda; Vlasta Parkanová	ODA
Minister of Education, Youth and Sport	Ivan Pilip; Jiří Gruša	ODS
Minister of Interior	Jan Ruml; Jindřich Vodička	ODS
Minister of Labour and Social Affairs	Jindřich Vodička; Stanislav Volák	ODS
Minister of Foreign Affairs	Josef Zieleniec; Jaroslav Šedivý	ODS
Minister without portfolio	Pavel Bratinka	ODA
