= Military Intelligence (Czech Republic) =

Czech governmental Intelligence agency

- Vojenské zpravodajství
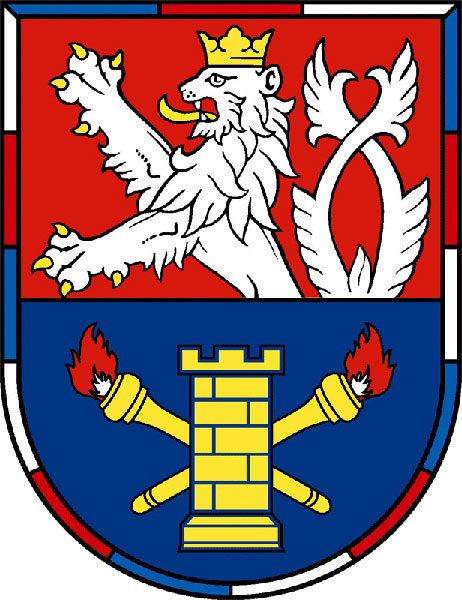

Agency overview
- Formed: 1919
- Jurisdiction: Ministry of Defence of the Czech Republic
- Headquarters: Prague, Czech Republic
- Minister responsible: Jaromír Zůna, Ministry of Defence (Czech Republic)
- Agency executive: Petr Bartovsky, Director
- Parent agency: Ministry of Defense
- Website: vzcr.cz

Military Intelligence (Czech; Vojenské zpravodajství, abbreviated as VZ) is the military intelligence service of the Czech Republic with activities in such fields as Imagery Intelligence (IMINT), Human Intelligence (HUMINT), Signal Intelligence (SIGINT), Open Sources Intelligence (OSINT). The agency also procures intelligence from co-operation with two or more intelligence agencies at a time. While Military Intelligence activities are directed all around the world, most activities are focused on so called "crisis regions" such as the Balkans, the Middle East, Afghanistan – Pakistan, Commonwealth of Independent States and Africa. In the past, Military Intelligence has cooperated with several intelligence agencies such as the Security Information Service, Office for Foreign Relations and Information, Ministry of Foreign Affairs, Police of the Czech Republic, General Customs Directorate.

Czech Military Intelligence also predicted the annexation of Crimea and the development of Ukraine. Military Intelligence also reported that Russia is trying to change the internal political situation in post-Soviet states where the most successful change was in Ukraine.

== History ==
=== Early years ===
The history of the Military Intelligence (Vojenského Zpravodajství) dates back to the first world war when the first intelligence groups were formed in the Czechoslovak Legions. The foundation of what would be Czech military intelligence would be laid down on October 28, 1918.

=== Communist era ===
The Intelligence Service of the General Staff of the Czechoslovak People's Army was the Czechoslovak military intelligence service from 1945 to 1992, built on the model of the Soviet GRU. Within the army, it was referred to under the code name 248th Operational Battalion and was directly subordinate to the Chief of the General Staff. The information obtained was provided first to the ČSLA high command and then to the Chief of Combined Staff of the Unified Armed Forces of the Warsaw Treaty Organization,

== Directors ==
=== Heads of the ZS/GŠ ČSLA ===
- Major Anton Rasla (1945)
- Colonel General Karel Hanus (1945 – 1948)
- Brigadier General Ludvík Klen (1948 – 1951)
- Major General Antonín Racek (1951 – 1959)
- Major General Oldřich Burda (1959 – 1968)
- Major General Josef Turošík (1968 – 1969)
- Lieutenant General Josef Brož (1969 – 1988)
- Major General Anton Slimák (1988 – 1989)
- Major General Jan Kozojed (1990 – 1992)

=== Directors of the VZ ===
- Brigadier General Miroslav Krejčík (December 2004 – May 2007)
- Lieutenant General Ondrej Páleník (June 2007 – 31 October 2012)
- Brigadier General Milan Kovanda (31 Octctober 2012 – 17 June 2013)
- Brigadier General Rostislav Pilc (17 June 2013 – 22 October 2014)
- Lieutenant General Jan Beroun (22 October 2014 – 1 July 2024)
- Lieutenant General Petr Bartovsky (since 1 July 2024)

== See also ==
- Office of Foreign Relations and Information
- Security Information Service
