= Minority government =

Type of parliamentary system government

A minority government, minority cabinet, minority administration, or a minority parliament is a government and cabinet formed in a parliamentary system when a political party or coalition of parties does not have a majority of overall seats in the legislature. It is sworn into office, with or without the formal support of other parties, enabling a government to be formed. Under such a government, legislation can only be passed with the support or consent of enough other members of the legislature to provide a majority, encouraging multi-partisanship. In bicameral legislatures, the term relates to the situation in the chamber whose confidence by its majority is considered most crucial to the continuance in office of that government (generally, the lower house).

A minority government tends to be less stable than a majority government because, if they can unite, opposing parliamentary members have sufficient numbers to vote against legislation, or even bring down the government with a vote of no confidence. If, however, a minority government can negotiate a confidence and supply agreement with parties sufficient to maintain a majority, it can be as stable as a majority government.

== Coalitions and alliances ==
To deal with situations in parliamentary systems where no clear majority to form a government exists, two or more parties may establish a formal coalition government, commanding a clear majority of the parliamentary members. A party might also enter into less formal alliances or agreements with other parties or individual members to allow the minority government to stay in office.

A common situation is a governance with "jumping majorities", where the cabinet stays as long as it can negotiate support from a majority in the parliament, even though that majority may be differently formed from issue to issue or bill to bill. On occasion, the legislature may permit a minority cabinet to continue in office despite having been defeated on a given vote, and a minority government might even bring on a confidence vote and threaten to resign should the legislature vote against it.

An alternative arrangement is a looser alliance of parties, exemplified by Sweden. There the long-governing Social Democrats have ruled with more or less formal support from other parties – in the mid-20th century from Agrarians, after 1968 from Communists, and more recently from Greens and ex-Communists – and have thus been able to retain executive power and (in practice) legislative initiative. This is also common in Canada, where nine elections from 1921 to 2005 effectively produced minority federal governments. The parties can rarely cooperate enough to establish a formal coalition but operate under a loose agreement instead.

Occasionally, a confidence and supply agreement may be formed. This is a more formal pact that still falls short of creating a coalition government. In the Canadian province of Ontario, the Liberal Party formed a minority government from 1985 to 1987 on the basis of a formal accord with the New Democratic Party (NDP): the NDP agreed to support the Liberals for two years on all confidence motions and budgetary legislation, in exchange for the passage of certain legislative measures proposed by the NDP. This was not a formal coalition, because the NDP remained an opposition party and was not given seats in the cabinet. In this case, the Liberals did not even have a plurality of seats: the Progressive Conservatives were the largest single party with 52 seats, whereas the Liberals had 48 and the NDP had 25.

New Zealand's 48th Parliament operated with both a coalition and a looser agreement: the government was a coalition between the Labour Party and the Progressives, while United Future and New Zealand First had an agreement to support the government on confidence matters, while the Green Party was able to negotiate a cooperation agreement.

=== Parliamentary confidence and supply ===
In parliamentary systems, minority governments may remain in office through agreements with political parties that do not formally join the government. These arrangements, commonly known as confidence and supply agreements, generally involve commitments to support the government in votes of confidence and in parliamentary votes authorising public expenditure. Supporting parties may retain the freedom to oppose government legislation on matters outside the agreement.

Such agreements are political arrangements rather than necessarily legally enforceable contracts. In New Zealand, parliamentary practice recognises that they can influence government policy, ministerial responsibilities and the conduct of parliamentary business. Their terms may be recorded in publicly available documents, allowing parties to specify the areas in which they will cooperate while maintaining separate political identities.

=== Simple plurality system ===
In most Westminster system nations, each constituency elects one member of parliament by simple plurality voting. This system heavily biases the vote towards increasing the number of seats of the top two parties and reducing the seats of smaller parties, a principle known in political science as Duverger's law, and thus minority governments are relatively uncommon. Advocates of this system see this as one of its advantages. A party with less than 40% of the popular vote can often win an outright majority of the seats. (For instance, in the 2005 UK General Election, the governing Labour party won by a majority of 66 seats in the House of Commons with only 35.2% of the popular vote.) If support for some parties is regionally concentrated, however, then Duverger's law applies separately to each region, and so no party can be sufficiently dominant in each region to receive a majority of the seats. This was the situation in Canada in the 2004, 2006, 2008, 2019, 2021, and 2025 federal elections, with no party obtaining a majority due in part to the dominance of the Bloc Québécois in the province of Quebec.

In Westminster systems, in minority situations, the incumbent government usually has the first opportunity to attempt to win the confidence of the House. This is so even if the incumbents have fewer seats – the incumbent prime minister still holds their commission for the duration of the writ period and immediately following an election. If they cannot form a government that commands the confidence of the House then it is expected that they will resign that commission voluntarily – it is not considered acceptable for the Sovereign (or his representative) to revoke said commission unless the prime minister was acting in serious breach of constitutional protocol. Nevertheless, usually, an incumbent government that loses its plurality in the House simply resigns, especially if the main opposition party is only a few seats short of having a majority or if it feels it has no chance of winning the support of enough members of smaller parties to win an initial confidence vote.

Nevertheless, the now-common practice of the party with the most seats forming the government has led to a widespread misconception among voters that a convention exists whereby the party with the most seats always gets to form the government. In fact, the most compelling reason for this practice is that the party with the most seats can survive confidence votes so long as smaller party (or parties) simply abstain from confidence votes, whereas a governing party without a plurality in the House needs at least one other party to vote with it at all times (assuming the largest party will always vote no confidence, but that is almost certain to occur when they are denied the opportunity to govern). This means that in most situations, the party with the most seats has the best chance and the least complicated route to winning a confidence vote, regardless of its place on the political spectrum.

At the Canadian federal level, in the four most recent of the five occasions a governing party lost the plurality without another winning a majority (1957, 1963, 1979, and 2006), the incumbent governments resigned rather than attempt to stay in power.

Whatever party forms the government must either form a coalition with one or more other parties, or they must win support from at least one other party (either a confidence and supply deal or case-by-case agreements on individual confidence questions) if the government is to survive. Because of the ever-present risk of a no-confidence motion, minority governments are frequently short-lived or fall before their term is expired. The leader of a minority government may also call an election in hopes of winning a stronger mandate from the electorate. In Canada, for instance, federal minority governments last an average of 18 months.

=== Australia ===
The unprecedentedly close 2010 Australian federal election produced a federal minority government in Australia for the first time since 1940. The Labor Party and Coalition both won 72 seats, 4 short of a majority. Labor won the two-party preferred vote by 0.24%. Six crossbenchers, consisting of four independents, one Greens MP, and one WA Nationals MP, held the balance of power. Ultimately, four crossbenchers gave confidence and supply to Labor, allowing them to form an extremely narrow minority government. This government stood until the 2013 election.

After the 2016 federal election, the Coalition formed a majority government of just one seat. They lost their majority after the 2018 leadership spill which deposed Prime Minister Malcolm Turnbull, as National Party MP Kevin Hogan moved to the crossbench. The government lost another seat after the 2018 Wentworth by-election, which was won by independent Kerryn Phelps. They lost another seat after MP Julia Banks resigned from the Liberal Party, reducing the government to 73 seats. However, they retained confidence from all three MPs, enabling them to remain in government.

Due to the much greater power of the Australian Senate, where no party usually holds a majority, than is typical in Westminster systems, Australian governments must typically negotiate with opposition parties to pass legislation, even when they enjoy sizeable majorities in the lower house. The Australian Senate may in principle withhold supply, bringing down the government; however, doing so would likely produce a constitutional crisis. Nonetheless, the necessity of getting Senate support imposes many of the difficulties of minority government on most Australian governments.

=== Belgium ===
Belgium is not unfamiliar with minority governments. Moreover, this type of government is not explicitly provided for in the Constitution, even though the Constitution does not prevent its existence. More often than not, minority governments emerge following elections when the government that was in power loses its majority and has to become a caretaker government pending the formation of a new government.

==== Legal grounds ====
In Belgium, it is the King who appoints the government. However, as Belgium is a democratic state, constitutional custom requires that this appointment must be approved by the Chamber of Representatives, the democratically elected body. This consent is given by a vote of confidence. There is, however, a small constitutional trick, since the majority required to obtain confidence is not calculated on the basis of all the members of parliament, but on the basis of the votes cast. As the specialist on minority governments in Belgium, Lucien Rigaux, points out, this means that the majority is calculated on the basis of the members present and does not require more than 76 votes (the majority of the 150 seats in the Chamber). Moreover, confidence is obtained if there are more votes in favour than against. For example, out of 100 votes cast, a minority government can be invested with 40 affirmative votes, 20 negative votes and 40 abstentions. The abstention of parties that, for various reasons, do not wish to enter the government thus makes it possible to form an emergency government with full powers and democratic legitimacy.

==== History ====
Never in the federated entities has a minority government been formed spontaneously. On the other hand, at the central and then federal state level, there have been five attempts to form a minority government. Three of these attempts were transformed. As Lucien Rigaux points out in an issue devoted to the history of minority governments in Belgium: "The first two attempts were failures. In 1925, the Liberals experienced an electoral debacle. They preferred to stay away from a government majority. The Catholic Party and the Belgian Workers' Party each won approximately 40 percent of the seats so they could not govern alone. However, within the Catholic Party, there remains serious reluctance to collaborate with the Socialists. It must be said that strong tensions between the two camps, particularly over the Flemishisation of the Ghent University and the management of external affairs, had led to the fall of the homogeneous Catholic government. After 38 days of caretaker government – which was relatively long for the time – the King appointed a Catholic cabinet. The latter was finally nipped in the bud by Parliament since the latter decided not to grant its confidence because the proposed Catholic coalition did not respect "Flemish national law", that it "was not qualified to resolve the difficulties of the parliamentary situation" and that it did not make it possible to fight the bourgeoisie".

In 1946, the government of national unity, which followed World War II, had already served its purpose. The Liberals felt that their new electoral defeat invited them to undergo an opposition cure. Socialists and Catholics clashed during the election campaign over the royal question of the return of King Leopold III to Belgium, which made the political climate particularly tense. The Socialists reject the invitation of the Catholic informer to form a government because the former want to associate the Communists, who have obtained a better result than the Liberal Party, with the government, while the Catholic Party categorically refuses to do so. After a month of political crisis, a cabinet composed solely of socialists is appointed by the King. In the parliamentary gallery, the then Prime Minister, Paul-Henri Spaak, declared: "if you think you can quickly give the country a government other than the one before you, stronger, based on a stable majority, do not hesitate, overthrow us. But if you don't have that assurance, if you foresee, after a negative vote, a long period of hesitation, conciliations, abortive attempts, then think carefully about what you are going to do". He nevertheless succumbs a few days later, since with as many votes in his favour as against him, he does not enjoy the confidence of Parliament. The defeat must have been all the more difficult to swallow as two Socialist MEPs had left before the vote in order not to miss their train to Liège.

On the other hand, the last three attempts were successful.

Firstly in 1958 a minority government received, for the first time, the support of Parliament. The Social Christian Party obtained a remarkable score that had nothing to envy to its results of the 19th century with 104 seats out of 212. However, the government's formation patinated notably on the school question which pitted Catholics and lay people against each other and which related to the financing of Catholic and public schools. Both the socialists and the liberals have the impression that they are playing a fool's game where the lowest bidder will have the chance to claim a few positions in a government that will carry out the entire Christian program. The Christian Social Party then tries to capitalize on its 104 seats to gain confidence. Contrary to all expectations, the abstention of one Volksunie member and two Liberals was enough to gain the confidence of Parliament. The Eyskens II minority government thus received the support of a relative majority of the members present, 106 in favour and 104 against. A few months later, the minority government became a majority government when the Liberal Party joined the government team after an agreement was reached on the school issue.

Then, in 1974, the political context was that of the state reforms initiated in 1970. Community autonomy was achieved, but the implementation of regionalisation was at a standstill, in particular because the Brussels dossier was repeatedly put on ice. Fifteen days after the elections of 10 March 1974, Léo Tindemans (CVP) was appointed formator. He is entering into negotiations with the Liberals and the Socialists to form a government that can benefit from a broad parliamentary base. While the liberals seem to be acquiescing, the negotiations with the socialists reveal divergences, mainly on the implementation of regionalisation, on the question of state interference in economic affairs and on the method of "community to community" negotiation involving so-called community parties rather than political families. The socialists, who had campaigned strongly on the left, decided in the Namur Congress to withdraw from the negotiations and denounced the formation of a "coalition of the rights". Not giving up on forming a large majority, the social-Christian and liberal political families negotiated with the community parties. A partial agreement is reached in Steenokkerzeel. For the Walloon Rally as long as there is no agreement on everything, there is no agreement on anything. Nevertheless, it decides to grant its benevolent abstentions to the Christian Liberal coalition so that a government can be formed quickly. With 100 votes in favour, 63 against and, above all, 47 abstentions, the minority Tindemans I government won the confidence of the House and the Senate five days later. The Walloon Rally also joined the coalition, which became a majority a few months later.

Finally, the last successful attempt was made in 2020 to fight the COVID-19 crisis. While the negotiations have been stalled since the last elections on 26 May 2019, the coronavirus crisis has brought down the cards. A sort of national union to which the N-VA does not, however, adhere, the Vlaams Belang and the PTB decided to give its confidence to the Wilmès II government in order to give it full powers and, above all, democratic legitimacy to deal with the health crisis.

==== Advantages and disadvantages ====
As with day-to-day business, the minority government provides a flexible institutional response in times of crisis that allows the state to continue to function and to be able to carry out its essential tasks. However, unlike a majority government, the action of a minority government is not locked to current affairs, day-to-day business or urgent decisions. It benefits from the fullness of its competences since it is constituted on the basis of a democratic decision which grants it de facto a certain democratic legitimacy.

The main disadvantage of minority government by the elected assembly is that it can be instituted without a majority of the members of Parliament having voted in favour of it, but that, on the other hand, a majority of the members of the assembly is required to dismiss it (76 minimum).

=== Canada ===
Minority governments can occur in the federal Parliament of Canada, and the legislatures of most provinces and territories except the Northwest Territories and Nunavut, which have non-partisan legislatures and operate as a consensus government.

During the history of federal Canadian politics, there have been fifteen minority governments, in fourteen separate minority parliaments. (Note: There were two minority governments during the life of 15th Canadian Parliament) Federal minority governments typically last less than two years. Exceptions to this include the 26th, 27th, 39th and 40th Canadian parliaments, which all lasted for longer than two years. The 14th Canadian Parliament functioned as a minority government for half of its duration, owing to floor-crossings and by-elections. The 15th Canadian Parliament was the only federal minority parliament that saw two different minority governments form. The most recent minority parliament elected at the federal level is the 45th Canadian Parliament, whose composition was determined in May 2025. However, it became a majority parliament in April 2026.

Minority governments also occur in all provincial legislatures, as well as the Yukon Legislative Assembly. However, minority governments do not occur as frequently in these legislatures as they do at the federal level. Ontario has seen six minority legislatures in its political history, the most among the 10 provinces and the territory of Yukon. Alberta is the only province that has never had a minority government in its provincial legislature.

While minority governments may occur in Canadian politics, the formation of a formal coalitions is rare, with past minority governments relying on cooperation and confidence and supply arrangements to govern instead. Historically, several coalition governments have formed in the 1840s and 1850s, in the Parliament of the Province of Canada. The formation of the Great Coalition in 1864 eventually led to Canadian Confederation in 1867. Since Canadian Confederation, only one wartime coalition between the Conservatives and Liberals has formed in federal Canadian politics in 1917. Coalition governments have occurred more frequently in provincial legislatures, with several provincial coalition governments having been formed in the 20th and 21st century.

=== Czech Republic ===
There were several cases of minority governments in the history of the Czech Republic.

First case was Second Cabinet of Václav Klaus (1996–1998) which consisted of ODS, KDU-ČSL and ODA. Deputies of ČSSD agreed to not appear in parliament during the vote of confidence and the government was thus voted in with confidence. Towards the end of 1997, cabinet resigned in connection with accusations of funding irregularities in the ODS.

Second case is the Cabinet of Miloš Zeman (1998–2002) that governed from 1998 to 2002. It was established by the so-called Opposition Agreement. It was a minority government of the Czech Social Democratic Party (ČSSD) supported by the Civic Democratic Party (ODS).

First Cabinet of Mirek Topolánek (2006–2007) was minority government of the Civic Democratic Party (ODS) and non-partisans. On 3 October 2006 the cabinet did not pass through Confidence and supply in Chamber of Deputies of the Parliament of the Czech Republic by 96 to 99.

First Cabinet of Andrej Babiš (2017–2018) consisted of ANO 2011. On 16 January 2018 the cabinet failed a confidence vote in the Chamber of Deputies of the Czech Republic, by 78 to 117. It was replaced by Second Cabinet of Andrej Babiš (2018-2021) which was minority coalition government consisting of ANO 2011 and Czech Social Democratic Party (ČSSD) which was supported by Communist Party of Bohemia and Moravia (KSČM).

=== Denmark ===
Denmark has a rich tradition of minority governments. Despite the country's electoral system of proportional representation, which almost always results in the winning party coming nowhere near a majority, single-party minority governments are still a regular occurrence in Danish politics.

Since 1982 even most of multi-party coalition governments in Denmark are minority ones; thus, the government of the day is still required to make deals with non-governing parties. More often small far-left or far-right parties provide confidence support of centre-left or centre-right coalition governments led by Social Democrats or Venstre. For many years, Danish politics has been divided into "Red" and "Blue" blocs, whose parliamentarians are typically expected to support Social Democratic and Venstre cabinets, respectively.

The Frederiksen Cabinet elected in the 2019 Danish general election was a single-party minority government of the Social Democrats (who received about 25% of the vote in the previous election) supported by three other parties; the previous cabinet, Lars Løkke Rasmussen III, was a three-party minority coalition led by Venstre and supported by the Danish People's Party. An earlier cabinet of Rasmussen's, Lars Løkke Rasmussen II, was a single-party Venstre minority government, a particularly notable feat, as Venstre only received about 20% of the vote in the election, finishing third.

=== Estonia ===
Estonia has had several minority governments. A minority cabinet can occur:

1. when the governing coalition loses support due to a coalition member leaving the governing coalition (Vähi II and Ansip II cabinets);
2. when the Prime Minister asks the ministers of a coalition party to be relieved of their duties (Kaja Kallas cabinet);
3. when MPs leave party factions (Ratas cabinet);
4. when a minority government is appointed with additional parliamentary support (Tõnisson IV, Vähi Interim, Siimann and Siim Kallas cabinets); or
5. when the government is voted into office with a plurality and some MPs abstain from voting (Birk, Tõnisson II, Piip and Akel cabinets).

Additional support is possible also because MPs leaving a party faction are not allowed to officially join another faction until the next elections. A government can be a minority government either throughout its term or just a part of its term, usually the latter. A list of minority cabinets:

- A. Birk cabinet (1920)
- J. Tõnisson II cabinet (1920)
- A. Piip cabinet (1920–1921)
- F. K. Akel cabinet (1924)
- J. Tõnisson IV cabinet (1933)
- T. Vähi Interim cabinet (1992)
- T. Vähi II cabinet (1996–1997)
- M. Siimann cabinet (1997–1999)
- S. Kallas cabinet (2002–2003)
- A. Ansip II cabinet (2009–2011)
- J. Ratas cabinet (2018–2019)
- K. Kallas I cabinet (2022)

=== France ===
Since the joint establishment of the Fifth Republic and of the two-round system for parliamentary elections in 1958, France has known only a few minority governments: indeed, the majoritarian electoral system usually produces seizable parliamentary majorities on which governments can rely, but there are some exceptions. Since 1958, only 3 out of 16 legislative elections resulted in a hung parliament: the 1988, 2022 and 2024 elections. In both instances, minority governments were formed following the elections, with no formal coalition or confidence-and-supply agreement being put in place to guarantee stability.

In fact, the French Constitution provides a large number of institutional tools to ensure political stability at the detriment of parliamentary sovereignty, constitutional tools that become critical when the executive power has to govern in minority:

- Article 44: allows the government to reject proposed amendments that have not been discussed in committee prior to the general discussion (44 paragraph 2); allows the government to ask for a parliamentary chamber to vote on the entirety or a part of a bill while overturning all amendments that have not been proposed or sponsored by the ministers (44 paragraph 3);
- Articles 47 and 47-1: if Parliament has not voted on the Government Budget (47) or the Social Security Budget (47-1) within the constitutional time limit (70 days for the Government Budget, 50 days for the Social Security Budget), then the government can implement its budget by decrees;
- Article 49: allows the government the possibility to avoid a vote of confidence on its program or general policy declaration in the lower house (49 paragraph 1); requires the absolute majority of the lower house's entire membership to pass a motion of no confidence (49 paragraph 2); allows the government to "commit its responsibility" on a bill per parliamentary session (apart from Government and Social Security budgets on which this special power can be used without numerical limit), the bill is considered passed without a vote unless a no-confidence motion is adopted by the lower house, thus effectively treating the bill as an issue of a vote of confidence (49 paragraph 3/49.3)

The minority governments in the history of France's Fifth Republic
Period	Government head	Parties	Seats				
Period	Government head	Parties	Government		Support	Total	
1988-1991	Michel Rocard	PS	275	47.7%	41	316/577	54.8%
1991-1992	Édith Cresson	PS	275	47.7%	0	275/577	47.7%
1992-1993	Pierre Bérégovoy	PS	275	47.7%	0	275/577	47.7%
2022–2024	Élisabeth Borne	RE – MoDem – HOR (Ensemble !)	251	43.5%	0 (Note: Despite surviving several motions of no confidence mainly thanks to centre-right to right-wing Republicans' abstention, no confidence-and-supply agreement is in place and the Republicans have formally declared themselves an opposition group in the National Assembly.)	251/577	43.5%
2024	Gabriel Attal	RE – MoDem – HOR (Ensemble !)	250	43.3%	0	250/577	43.3%
2024	Michel Barnier	RE – MoDem – HOR (Ensemble !) – LR – UDI – PR	212	36.9%	0	212/577	36.9%
2024–2025	François Bayrou	RE – MoDem – HOR (Ensemble !) – LR – UDI – PR	212	36.9%	0	166/577	36.9%
2025–present	Sébastien Lecornu	RE – MoDem – HOR (Ensemble !)	166	28.8%	49 (Note: Despite several motions of no confidence mainly thanks to centre-right to centre-left Socialist Party' abstention, no confidence-and-supply agreement is in place and the Socialists have formally declared themselves an opposition group in the National Assembly.)	215/577	37.2%

The previous Borne government was a three-party minority coalition government as result of the June 2022 parliamentary elections that saw President Macron's coalition lose its parliamentary majority in the National Assembly, going from a 115-seat majority to a hung parliament in which the centrist presidential coalition was the largest bloc but 38 short of an overall majority. The Borne cabinet survived to 31ss motions of no confidence and Prime Minister Borne triggered constitutional article 49.3 23 times, mostly to pass the 2023 Government and Social Security Budgets but also to pass its pension system reform in March 2023. Nonetheless, the government lost several parliamentary votes, an oddity under the Fifth Republic.

=== Germany ===
Minority government is unusual in Germany, though it was more common historically during the German Empire and the Weimar Republic. In the Federal Republic (since 1949), the constructive vote of no confidence theoretically grants minority governments a high degree of longevity, but they are rare in practice. No minority government has ever been invested on the federal level, though brief periods of minority government have existed when a government has lost its majority mid-term. Minority governments have also existed at the state level, sometimes for substantial periods. The viability of minority government varies between states, as some require an absolute majority vote by parliament for a government to be invested, while others require only a simple majority or plurality.

Between 1949 and December 2017, there were 31 periods of minority government in Germany, including four at the federal and 27 at the state level. All four federal instances were the result of an incumbent government losing its majority: the fourth Adenauer cabinet after the withdrawal of the FDP; the second Erhard cabinet, also after the withdrawal of the FDP; the first Brandt cabinet after parliamentary defections; and the third Schmidt cabinet after the dismissal of the FDP. Of these, only the second Erhard and third Schmidt cabinets are considered "true" minority governments, as the fourth Adenauer cabinet was quickly dissolved and replaced by the fifth Adenauer cabinet, and the first Brandt cabinet retained a technical majority due to the Bundestag delegation from Berlin. Erhard and Schmidt's minority governments were short-lived, lasting less than a month, and both ended with the Chancellor leaving office.

Between 1949 and December 2017, nine different states had at least one period of minority government, with some having as many as four. Compared to the federal level, state-level minority governments usually survived much longer, lasting an average of 333 days. The longest was the two SPD-led minority governments of Reinhold Höppner in Saxony-Anhalt, which served two complete terms (1,452 and 1,406 days, respectively) between 1994 and 2002. These governments, enabled by the abstention of the PDS during confidence votes, were dubbed the "Magdeburger model". However, most minority governments still resulted from the loss of a majority – on 13 occasions due to the withdrawal of a coalition partner, on 12 occasions due to defeat in an election, and on four occasions due to parliamentary defections. Only seven minority governments were formed on a "tolerance" basis similar to the Magdeburger model. Furthermore, only two minority governments lasted more than a single term: the aforementioned Höppner governments in Saxony-Anhalt, and from 1982 to 1983 and 1983–85 in Hesse, when the Greens tolerated two consecutive SPD minority governments (this arrangement ended in 1985 when the SPD and Greens entered into coalition.)

Other examples of a minority government on a state level include the first government of Klaus Wowereit in Berlin, comprising a minority coalition of the SPD and Greens supported by the PDS, which was invested after a corruption scandal led to the collapse of the previous CDU government; it served on an interim basis from June 2001 until the October state election. The first government of Hannelore Kraft in North Rhine-Westphalia, comprising a coalition of the SPD and Greens tolerated by The Left, was formed after the 2010 state election and served until the 2012 election. The second government of Bodo Ramelow in Thuringia, a coalition of The Left, SPD, and Greens, was invested with the tolerance of the CDU to resolve the 2020 Thuringian government crisis.

=== Ireland ===
The Irish parliamentary system broadly works on a simple majority system, where the Taoiseach is elected by the Dáil when they achieve 50% + 1 of the votes in favour of their nomination. The Taoiseach then appoints the members of the government with the approval of the Dáil. Since the 1980s, the popularity of other parties has increased such that coalition governments are now typical and expected, with one of the two major parties being the senior partner, and with one or more junior partners ensuring that the coalition retains a majority in the Dáil.

A minority government is formed when a party (or a coalition) secures agreement from one or more other parties or independent TDs who are not members of the government to support their nomination for Taoiseach and achieve majority support. Support for bills and other items requiring a Dáil majority vote is then negotiated on a bill-by-bill basis.

If no agreement can be reached to nominate an individual to lead a government, the outgoing Taoiseach (continuing to act in a caretaker capacity) can seek dissolution of the Dáil and call a new general election. However, this circumstance has not occurred to date.

The last Dáil with a single-party simple majority government was the 21st Dáil elected at the 1977 general election. Fifteen of the 32 governments in Irish history were minority governments, most of which were formed by Fianna Fáil.

- 1922
- 1923
- June 1927
- September 1927
- 1932 (Fianna Fáil)
- 1933 (Fianna Fáil)
- 1937 (Fianna Fáil)
- 1943 (Fianna Fáil)
- 1951 (Fianna Fáil)
- 1961 (Fianna Fáil)
- 1981 (Fine Gael–Labour Party)
- February 1982 (Fianna Fáil)
- 1987 (Fianna Fáil)
- 1997 (Fianna Fáil–Progressive Democrats)
- 2016 (Fine Gael)

=== Netherlands ===
Coalitions in the Netherlands are formed with the support from parliamentary parties, elected by proportional representation. Although very rare, minority governments can be formed during the formation period of a Dutch cabinet, if an election result makes a majority coalition impossible. More often, a minority government is formed when one of the cabinet's coalition partners withdraws its support, or when all ministers of a given parliamentary party resign. In these cases, the Prime Minister offers the full cabinet's resignation to the Dutch Monarch.

At this point, the Monarch may choose to dissolve Parliament and hold a general election. The cabinet continues to serve as demissionary. A demissionary cabinet is not a minority government but a form of caretaker government, enjoying only limited powers until the new Parliament assembles.

If the Monarch does not dissolve Parliament, the remaining cabinet continues as a minority cabinet, in full possession of its powers. It can finish any legislation already before underpreparation, if Parliament passes it by majority vote; this necessitates the support of parties outside the government. Theoretically, early general elections need not be held, but they are often necessary in practice, since the coalition agreement no longer has parliamentary support.

A third option is available to the Monarch: the formation of a new cabinet of different Parliamentary parties (which may include the defecting coalition partner). Elections are then held as scheduled at the end of the parliamentary term, since the Monarch does not dissolve parliament if an informateur has been able to negotiate a new coalition agreement.

The Netherlands had a minority government in 2010–2012: the First Rutte cabinet. This government was supported in parliament by the Party For Freedom, which all together provided the government a majority.

=== Norway ===
As of January 20, 2020 Norway has a minority government. In the beginning of 2019, the Christian Democratic party KrF joined Erna Solberg's cabinet, that had been ruling with a minority since 2013, to form a majority. On January 20, 2020, the Progress party, FrP, announced that they would withdraw from their role in government, and become an opposition party, despite continuing their support of Erna Solberg as Prime Minister.

Norway has had multiple minority governments throughout history, including cabinets led by John Lyng, Kjell Magne Bondevik, and Jens Stoltenberg.

=== Singapore ===
In the Legislative Assembly elections held on 2nd April 1955, the LF emerged as the single largest party with 10 seats of the 25 seats. David Marshall formed a minority government with the support of UMNO and MCA. Marshall's successor Lim Yew Hock led this minority government till its electoral defeat in 1959.

In the elections held on 30th May 1959, the PAP led by Lee Kuan Yew won in a landslide. They secured 43 of the 51 available seats and trounced the incumbent SPA government of Lim Yew Hock. However, this majority was short-lived. In July 1960, then Minister for National Development Ong Eng Guan resigned as Minister and from the ruling PAP, along with two other members. This brought PAP's strength to 40. In July 1961, 14 left-wing members of the PAP were expelled for failing to vote for the PAP in a motion of confidence brought by Prime Minister Lee Kuan Yew. This led to PAP's tally in the Assembly to fall to 26 - a one-seat majority. This one-seat majority was lost in July 1962 with one defection to the newly formed Barisan Sosialis. On 16 August 1962, the PAP regained this one-seat majority with a defection from Ong Eng Guan's new created UPP. This did not last long and five days later, PAP lost its majority when then Minister for Labour Ahmad Ibrahim died suddenly. From then until the 1963 election, the PAP governed in the minority with 25 of the 51 seats.

With the PAP winning the 1963 elections with more than a two-thirds majority, and subsequently dominating parliament with the resultant by-elections and general elections, 1963 would mark the last time Singapore witnessed a minority government.

=== Slovakia ===
Dzurinda's Second Cabinet (2002-2006) was a majority government of SDKÚ, KDH, ANO and SMK. ANO left the cabinet in 2005 while KDH left in 2006. As a result the cabinet continued as a minority cabinet for several months.

Cabinet of Eduard Heger (2021-2023) composed of Ordinary People and Independent Personalities (OĽaNO), We Are Family, Freedom and Solidarity (SaS), and For the People lost its majority in September 2022 when SaS left the government. The cabinet lost a no-confidence vote on 15 December 2022 and ruled until it was succeeded by a caretaker government composed of non-party experts led by Ľudovít Ódor on 15 May 2023.

=== Sweden ===
Sweden has had several minority governments, most of the time led by the Swedish Social Democratic Party, with the support of the Socialist Left Party until 2006. The centre-right Alliance, then led by the Moderate Party, formed a minority coalition government from 2010 to 2014. The recent minority coalition government is led by the Moderate Party, which is supported by Sweden Democrats.

=== Turkey ===
A list of minority governments in Turkey:

- 28th government of Turkey (25 December 1963 – 20 February 1965)
- 38th government of Turkey (17 November 1974 – 31 March 1975)
- 40th government of Turkey (21 June 1977 – 21 July 1977)
- 43rd government of Turkey (12 November 1979 – 11 September 1980)
- 51st government of Turkey (5 October 1995 – 30 October 1995)
- 53rd government of Turkey (6 March 1996 – 28 June 1996)
- 56th government of Turkey (11 January 1999 – 28 May 1999)

=== United Kingdom ===
There have been many occasions since 1900 when a single party has not commanded a parliamentary majority, although the 2010–2015 Conservative/Liberal Democrat coalition government was the first formal coalition of its type in Britain since the National Government between 1931 and 1945. Westminster and the British media tend to perceive minority governments as unstable and ineffective, as they causes problems such as governments lacking the strength to pass legislation, vulnerability to a motion of no confidence and the necessity for a coalition government which would result in policy compromises and a diluted political agenda. Coalition governments could also be viewed as unstable possibly due to examples of minority governments (Callaghan and Major) occurring as the result of governments in decline. Examples of minority governments include:

==== Harold Wilson (1974–1979) ====
The Labour Party, led by Harold Wilson, formed a minority government for seven months after the General Election of February 1974. That situation lasted until the prime minister called another election in October that year, following which the Labour Government obtained a small majority of three. The following administration also became a minority government after the collapse of the Lib-Lab pact in 1978, and the then British Prime Minister James Callaghan's Government fell in March 1979 as the result of a vote of no confidence which was carried by a single vote.

==== John Major (1996–1997) ====
A minority Government held power in the UK between December 1996 and the general election in May 1997. The Conservative Party, led by John Major, had won the 1992 General Election with an absolute majority of 21 seats over all other parties. That majority was progressively whittled away through defections and by-elections defeat, the most notable of the latter including those in Newbury, South East Staffordshire and Wirral South, resulting in the eventual loss of the Major government's majority in Parliament. However, the Conservatives maintained support from Northern Ireland's Ulster Unionist Party and Democratic Unionist Party.

==== David Cameron (2010–2015) ====
In the 2010 General Election, the Conservatives won the most seats and votes, but only a minority of seats in parliament. There was some discussion after the election of the possibility of creating a Conservative minority government and, because the then Prime Minister Gordon Brown had the first opportunity to form a government, there were also talks about creating some sort of alliance between the Labour Party, the Liberal Democrats and the other smaller parties. However Brown waived his right, acknowledging that because the Conservative Party had won the largest number of seats in the House of Commons, it should have the first opportunity to form a government. Further discussions then led to the establishment of a formal coalition between the Conservatives and the Liberal Democrats, which enabled the formation of a majority government, because it was thought that would ensure more stability.

==== Theresa May (2017–2019) ====
In 2016, Theresa May took over from David Cameron as Prime Minister, after he resigned as a result of the Brexit referendum, when the UK voted to leave the EU. May decided to call a snap election in 2017 to strengthen her hand in the Brexit negotiations. In the 2017 General Election, the Conservatives won the most seats and votes but lost their majority in the House of Commons, which instead weakened their hand in the Brexit negotiations. The Conservative Party, led by Theresa May, formed a minority government, with 317 seats, on 9 June 2017. On 10 June, the Prime Minister's Office announced a deal with the Democratic Unionist Party which would see the DUP support the Conservative government on a confidence and supply arrangement. However, the DUP later announced that no such deal had been reached. This remained the case until 26 June 2017, when a deal was agreed and announced between the two parties.

==== Boris Johnson (2019) ====
After Theresa May resigned in May 2019, Boris Johnson became the new party leader and Prime Minister. For much of the Johnson Ministry up until the 2019 general election; the government was a minority government. The suspension of the whip of 21 Conservative MPs on 24 July 2019 resulted in the government being 43 seats short of a working majority (a majority of voting MPs). The government lost several Parliamentary votes in the autumn of 2019 before a general election was called. Johnson gained the Conservatives' biggest majority since Margaret Thatcher was Prime Minister in 1987 after the 2019 United Kingdom general election, ending this run of minority governments.

==== Scotland ====
===== 2007 =====
After the 2007 general election, the Scottish National Party led by Alex Salmond formed a minority government in the Scottish Parliament.

The SNP had won 47 seats out of 129 in the election, some way short of an absolute majority of seats in the Scottish Parliament, but more than any other single party gained. The SNP were unable to negotiate a majority coalition government with any other party, but as no other combination of parties were able to agree on a deal, the SNP chose to form a one-party minority government. They often negotiated with confidence and supply support from the Scottish Green Party and the Scottish Conservative Party to pass certain legislation.

===== 2016 =====
After the 2016 general election, The SNP won 63 out of 129 seats in the Scottish Parliament, losing their governing majority they won in 2011, but they went on to form a one-party minority government, led by Nicola Sturgeon. Throughout the parliamentary term, they informally co-operated with the Scottish Green Party.

===== 2021-2024 =====
Following the 2021 general election, the Scottish National Party fell one seat short of an overall majority. They went on to form another minority government, led by Nicola Sturgeon. The SNP then formed a coalition government with the Scottish Greens in August 2021, lifting Sturgeon's third government out of minority status.

On 25 April 2024, First Minister Humza Yousaf suspended the power sharing agreement with the Scottish Greens resulting in an SNP minority government.

John Swinney won the Scottish National Party leadership election and formed a minority government.

==== Wales ====
After the 2007 Assembly election, the Welsh Labour Party led by Rhodri Morgan initially formed a minority government in the National Assembly of Wales. This was because they gained 26 seats in the election, which was short of an absolute majority of seats in the Assembly. Whilst Labour were initially unable to form a coalition with the Liberal Democrats, a 'Rainbow Coalition' of the Conservative Party (UK), Liberal Democrats and Plaid Cymru failed to come to fruition. However, on 6 July 2007, Welsh Labour Party members voted for a coalition with Plaid, which was followed by a similar result from Plaid Cymru members the next day. As a result, the Welsh Assembly was controlled by the Labour-Plaid alliance with Rhodri Morgan as First Minister (up until his retirement in 2009 and subsequent replacement by Carwyn Jones as First Minister) and Plaid Leader Ieuan Wyn Jones as his deputy. After the 2011 Welsh General Election, Welsh Labour won 30 seats and entered into a new government, one seat short of an overall majority. In 2016 Welsh Labour returned with 29 seats out of 30 and formed a government with the one remaining Liberal Democrat AM, again one seat short of an overall majority. A minority government was also formed following the 2021 Senedd election, when Welsh Labour returned 30 seats, half of the legislature's available 60, but one short of a working majority (31), yet no coalition government was formed, with Labour relying on bipartisanship (minimally 1 extra vote from a non-Labour seat) for the passing of any legislation.

== List of current minority governments ==
Countries with a minority government as of 19 November 2026
Country	Head of government	Legislature/lower chamber	Parties	Seats				
Country	Head of government	Legislature/lower chamber	Parties	Government		Support (Note: Support by another party short of a coalition, for example in a confidence and supply arrangement.)	Total	
Austria	Christian Stocker	National Council	ÖVP – NEOS	68	37.2%	0	68/183	37.2%
Croatia	Andrej Plenković	Croatian Parliament	HDZ – DP	66	44.0%	12	78/150	52.0%
Denmark	Mette Frederiksen	Folketing	SD – SF – M – RV	82	45.8%	20	102/179	57.0%
France	Sébastien Lecornu	National Assembly	RE – MoDem – HOR (Ensemble !)	166	28.8%	118	279/577	48.4%
Iran	Masoud Pezeshkian	Islamic Consultative Assembly	Reformists	43	14.8%	119	162/290	55.8%
Netherlands	Rob Jetten	House of Representatives	D66 – VVD – CDA	66	44.0%	0	66/150	44.0%
Norway	Jonas Gahr Støre	Storting	A/Ap	53	31.4%	35	88/169	52.1%
Portugal	Luís Montenegro	Assembly of the Republic	PPD/PSD – CDS-PP (AD)	91	39.6%	0	91/230	39.6%
Romania	Luca Niculescu	Parliament	PSD	127	27.4%	154	281/464	60.6%
Slovakia	Robert Fico	National Council	SMER-SD – HLAS-SD – SNS	75	50.0%	4	79/150	52.7%
Slovenia	Janez Janša	National Assembly	SDS – NSi – SLS – FOKUS (NSi, SLS, FOKUS) – Demokrati.	43	47.8%	7	50/90	55.6%
Spain	Pedro Sánchez	Congress of Deputies	PSOE – Sumar	147	42.0%	32	179/350	51.1%
Taiwan	Cho Jung-tai	Legislative Yuan	DPP	51	45.1%	0	51/113	45.1%

Sub-national entities with a minority government as of 19 November 2026
Country	Head of government	Legislature	Parties	Seats				
Country	Head of government	Legislature	Parties	Government		Support (Note: Support by another party short of a coalition, for example in a confidence and supply arrangement.)	Total	
(Spain) Asturias	Adrián Barbón	General Junta	FSA-PSOE	19	42.2%	4	23/45	51.1%
(Portugal) Azores	José Manuel Bolieiro	Legislative Assembly of the Azores	PPD/PSD – CDS–PP – PPM	26	45.6%	3	29/57	50.9%
(Spain) Balearic Islands	Marga Prohens	Parliament of the Balearic Islands	PP	25	42.3%	9	34/59	57.6%
(Spain) Catalonia	Salvador Illa	Parliament of Catalonia	PSC	42	31.1%	26	68/135	50.4%
(Spain) Murcia	Fernando López Miras	Assembly of Murcia	PP	21	46.6%	9	30/45	66.6%
(Spain) Navarre	María Chivite	Parliament of Navarre	PSN – GBai – Podemos	21	42.0%	9	30/50	60.0%
(Germany) Saxony	Michael Kretschmer	Landtag of Saxony	CDU – SPD	51	42.5%	6 (Note: Die Linke is effectively supporting the government while being under a nominal cordon sanitaire by the CDU.)	57/120	47.5%
(Malaysia) Negeri Sembilan	Aminuddin Harun	State Legislative Assembly	PH	17	47.2%	0	17/36	47.2%
(Australia) New South Wales	Chris Minns	Legislative Assembly	Labor	45	48.4%	3	48/93	51.6%
(United Kingdom) Scotland	John Swinney	Scottish Parliament	SNP	57	44.2%	0	57/129	44.2%
(Australia) Tasmania	Jeremy Rockliff	Tasmanian House of Assembly	Liberal	14	40.0%	4	15/35	41.8%
(Germany) Thuringia	Mario Voigt	Landtag of Thuringia	CDU – TH.G – SPD	38	43.2%	16	54/88	61.4%
(United Kingdom) Wales	Rhun ap Iorwerth	Senedd	Plaid Cymru	43	44.8%	0	43/96	44.8%

== See also ==
- Coalition government
- Hung parliament
- Majority government
