= Petr Moos =

Czech engineer, academic and politician (1946–2024)

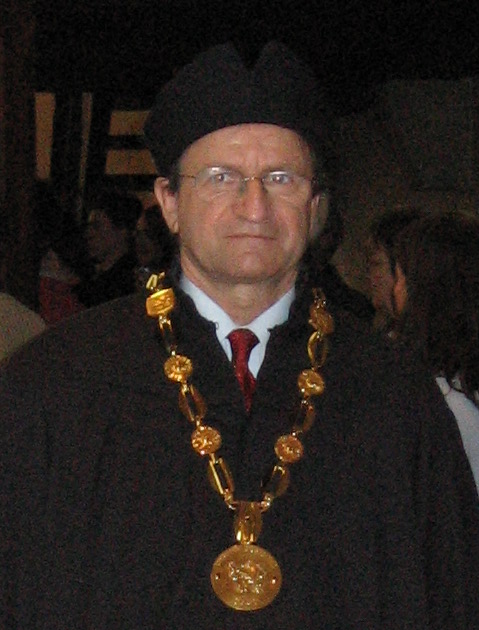
- Moos in 2006

Minister of Transport
- In office 2 January 1998 – 22 July 1998
- Prime Minister: Josef Tošovský
- Preceded by: Martin Říman
- Succeeded by: Antonín Peltrám

Personal details
- Born: 3 February 1946 Prague, Czechoslovakia
- Died: 23 February 2024 (aged 78) Czech Republic
- Party: independent
- Spouse: Jiřina Moosová
- Education: Czech Technical University in Prague

Petr Moos (3 February 1946 – 23 February 2024) was a Czech transportation engineer, academic and politician, who served as Minister of Transport in 1998. From 1994, he served as the first dean of the Faculty of Transportation Sciences of the Czech Technical University in Prague.

In 2015, he received the Medal of Merit (first grade). Moos died in February 2024, at the age of 78.
