= Vladimír Vetchý =

Czech politician (born 1949)

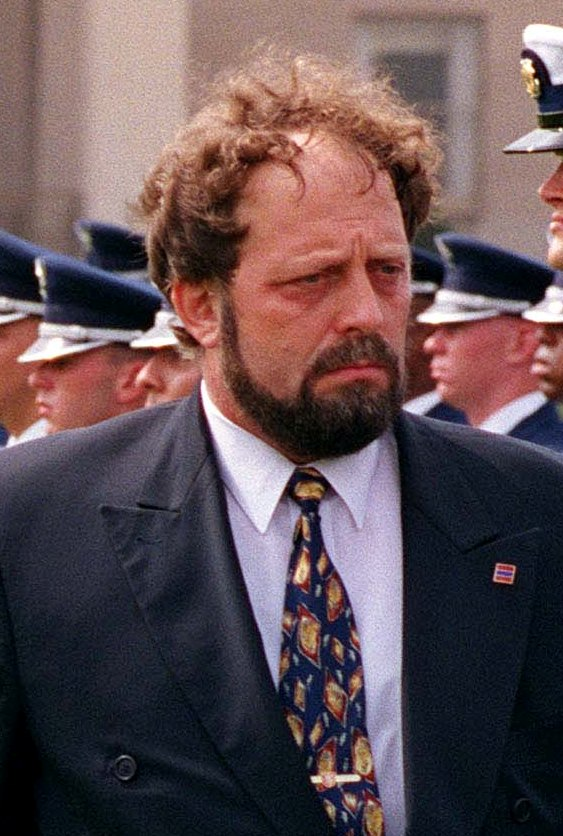

Minister of Defence
- In office 22 July 1998 – 4 May 2001
- Prime Minister: Miloš Zeman
- Preceded by: Michal Lobkowicz
- Succeeded by: Jaroslav Tvrdík

Personal details
- Born: 9 May 1949 (age 77) Třebíč, Czechoslovakia
- Party: KSČ (1980–1989); ČSSD (1991–present)
- Education: Masaryk University

Vladimír Vetchý (born 1949) is a former Czech politician for Czech Social Democratic Party. He served as defense minister from 22 July 1998 to 3 May 2001 in Miloš Zeman's Cabinet. Vetchý was criticized for failing to meet targets relating to the Czech Republic's NATO accession, leading to his dismissal.
