= Jaromír Zůna =

Deputy Prime Minister of the Czech Republic (since 2025)

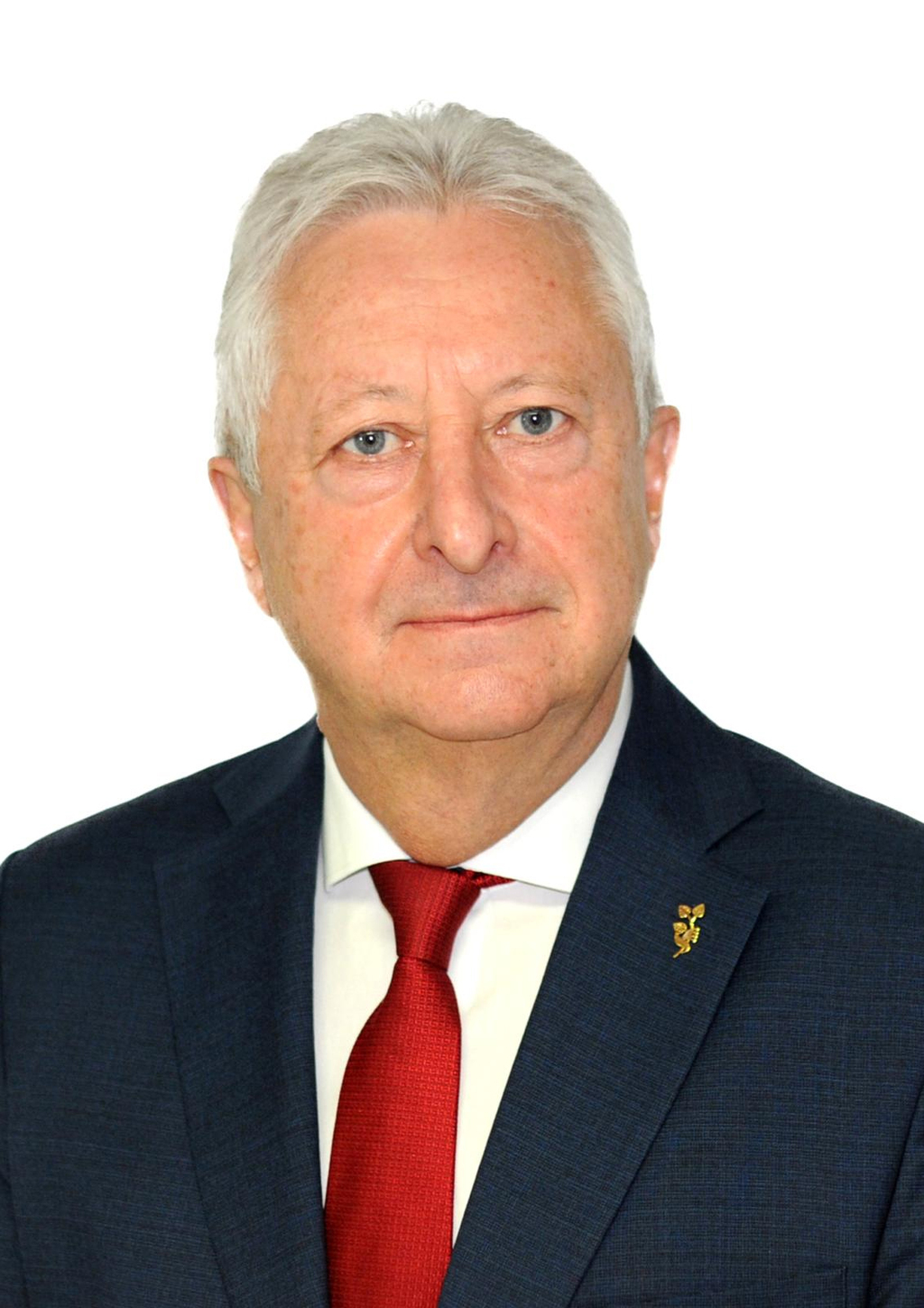
- Official portrait, 2025

Deputy Prime Minister of the Czech Republic
- Incumbent
- Assumed office 15 December 2025
- Prime Minister: Andrej Babiš

Minister of Defence
- Incumbent
- Assumed office 15 December 2025
- Prime Minister: Andrej Babiš
- Preceded by: Jana Černochová

Personal details
- Born: 26 November 1960 (age 65) Přílepy, Czechoslovakia
- Party: Independent
- Other political affiliations: KSČ (1981–1989); Nominated by SPD (2025)

Military service
- Allegiance: Czechoslovakia (1976–1992); Czech Republic (1993–2023)
- Branch/service: Czechoslovak People's Army (1976–1990); Czechoslovak Army (1990–1992); Czech Army (1993–2023)
- Years of service: 1979–2018
- Rank: Lieutenant general

Jaromír Zůna (born 26 November 1960) is a Czech politician and retired lieutenant general, serving as deputy prime minister and minister of defense of the Czech Republic since December 2025.

== Life ==
He was born into a military family, his father Zdeněk Zůna was an officer in the Czechoslovak People's Army, where he served as a computer expert in the 7th Special Purpose Airborne Regiment in Holešov. Although most of the unit's members were dismissed or persecuted after August 1968 and the Holešov Barracks Incident, Zdeněk Zůna was transferred to Vyškov, where he served until 1978.

Jaromír Zůna studied at the Jan Žižka Military Gymnasium in Opava from 1976 to 1980. After graduation, he was originally supposed to study at the Klement Gottwald Military Political Academy in Bratislava, but this did not happen, therefore, he continued his studies in the command and engineering motorized rifle field at the Ludvík Svoboda Military Academy of the Land Forces in Vyškov, which he completed in 1984. From 1985 to 1988, he completed a distance learning course in Arabic at the Antonín Zápotocký Military Academy in Brno. In 2010, he completed his doctoral studies at the University of Defence. From 2014 to 2017, he studied international relations and European studies at the Metropolitan University Prague.

== Military career ==
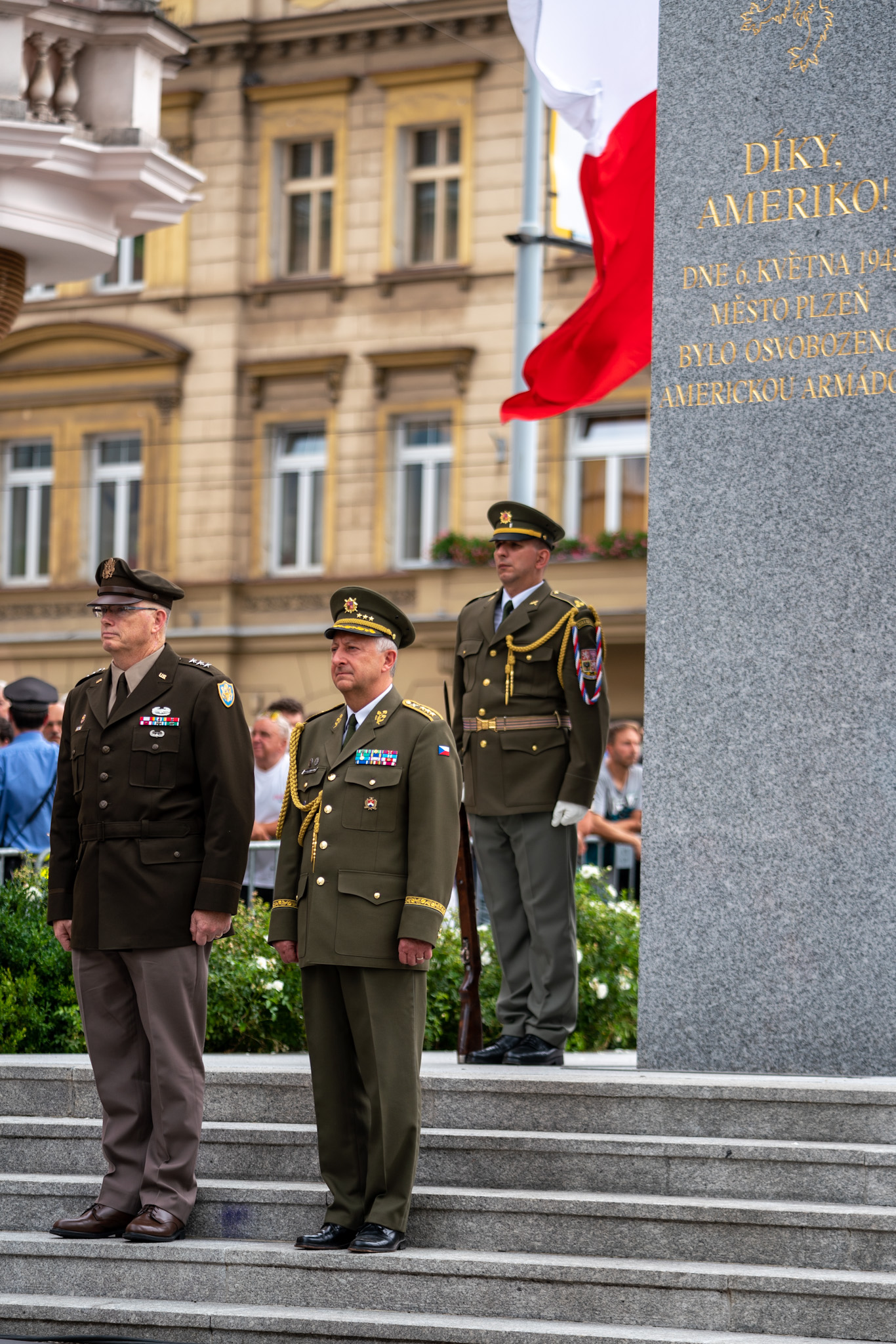
Lieuteant General Zůna (center) at the Thank You, America! monument in Pilsen during Mike Pompeo's visit to the Czech Republic on August 11, 2020.

He began his military career in 1984 as a platoon commander of the first-year school units of students of the faculty of motorized rifle troops of the Military School of the Slovak Republic. In the rank of first lieutenant, he expressed interest in working in military intelligence in 1988, stating that he would join the intelligence course in 1989 or 1990. The intelligence service was interested in him due to his abilities and knowledge, but his joining the intelligence course probably did not take place due to the Velvet Revolution at the end of 1989.

In the late 1990s, he was the deputy commander of the 6th Mechanized Battalion of the Implementation Force and the Stabilisation Force in Bosnia and Herzegovina, and in 2013 he became the deputy commander at the Joint Force Training Centre.

He was appointed Brigadier General on 8 May 2010. He was appointed Major General by President Miloš Zeman on 8 May 2016. From January 2019 to 2022. he served as First Deputy Chief of the General Staff, and was appointed Lieutenant General on 8 May 2019. From 2023 to 2024, he worked as a military attaché at the Embassy of the Czech Republic in Beijing. In January 2025, he ended his service in the army, and later began working in an arms company.

== Political activity ==
While studying at the Opava Military Gymnasium, he became a candidate for a member of the Communist Party of Czechoslovakia (KSČ) in December 1979, and was accepted as a member of the KSČ in December 1981. At that time, he served as the deputy commander for political affairs, in his class of students. From 1983 to 1984, he was an active member of the Socialist Youth Union.

=== Minister of Defense ===
After the 2025 Czech parliamentary election to the Chamber of Deputies of the Czech Republic, Zůna was speculated to be a possible future Minister of Defense for the SPD . On 26 November 2025, Prime Minister-designate Andrej Babiš informally submitted to the President Petr Pavel a coalition proposal of candidates for members of his government, where Zůna was proposed by the Freedom and Direct Democracy movement for the post of Minister of Defense. On 15 December 2025, the President appointed him to this position.

== Personal life ==
He is married and has two sons (Jaromír and Ondřej) with his wife Hana. He is fluent in English, Arabic, Russian and French.
