= Thun Palace =

- Thunovský palác
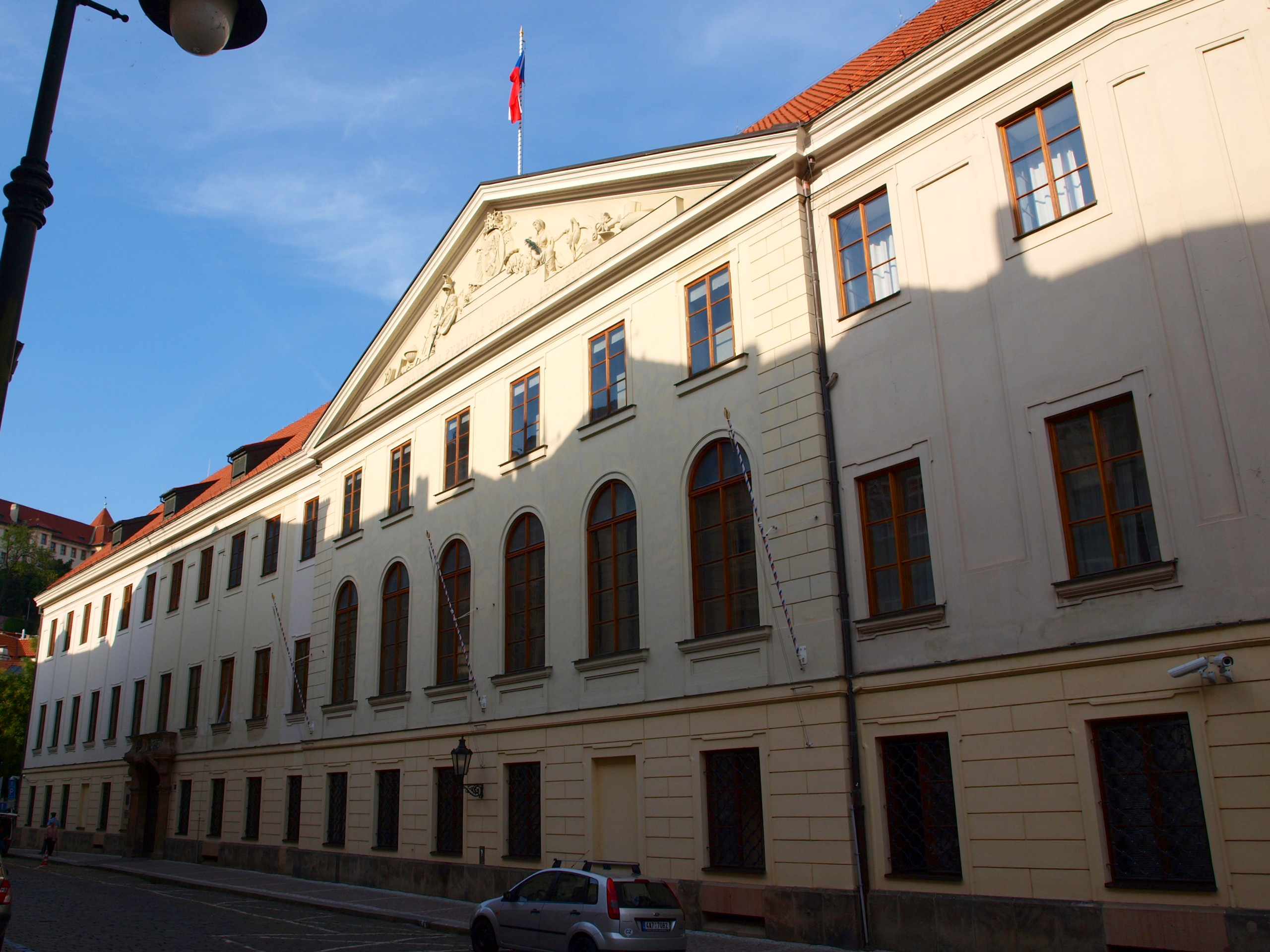

General information
- Architectural style: Neoclassical
- Location: Prague, Czech Republic
- Coordinates: 50°5′24″N 14°24′0″E
- Current tenants: Chamber of Deputies of the Czech Republic
- Groundbreaking: 1726

National Cultural Monument of the Czech Republic
- Designated: October 15, 1992
- Reference no.: 39154/1-631

Thun Palace (Czech: Thunovský palác) is the seat of the Chamber of Deputies of the Czech Republic, located in Malá Strana, Prague. It has been listed as a National Cultural Monument of the Czech Republic since 1992.

== History ==
Thun Palace has been listed as a Cultural Monument of the Czech Republic since May 3, 1958, and a National Cultural Monument of the Czech Republic since October 15, 1992.

== See also ==
- Wallenstein Palace
- Thun und Hohenstein
