= Martin Barták =

Czech politician

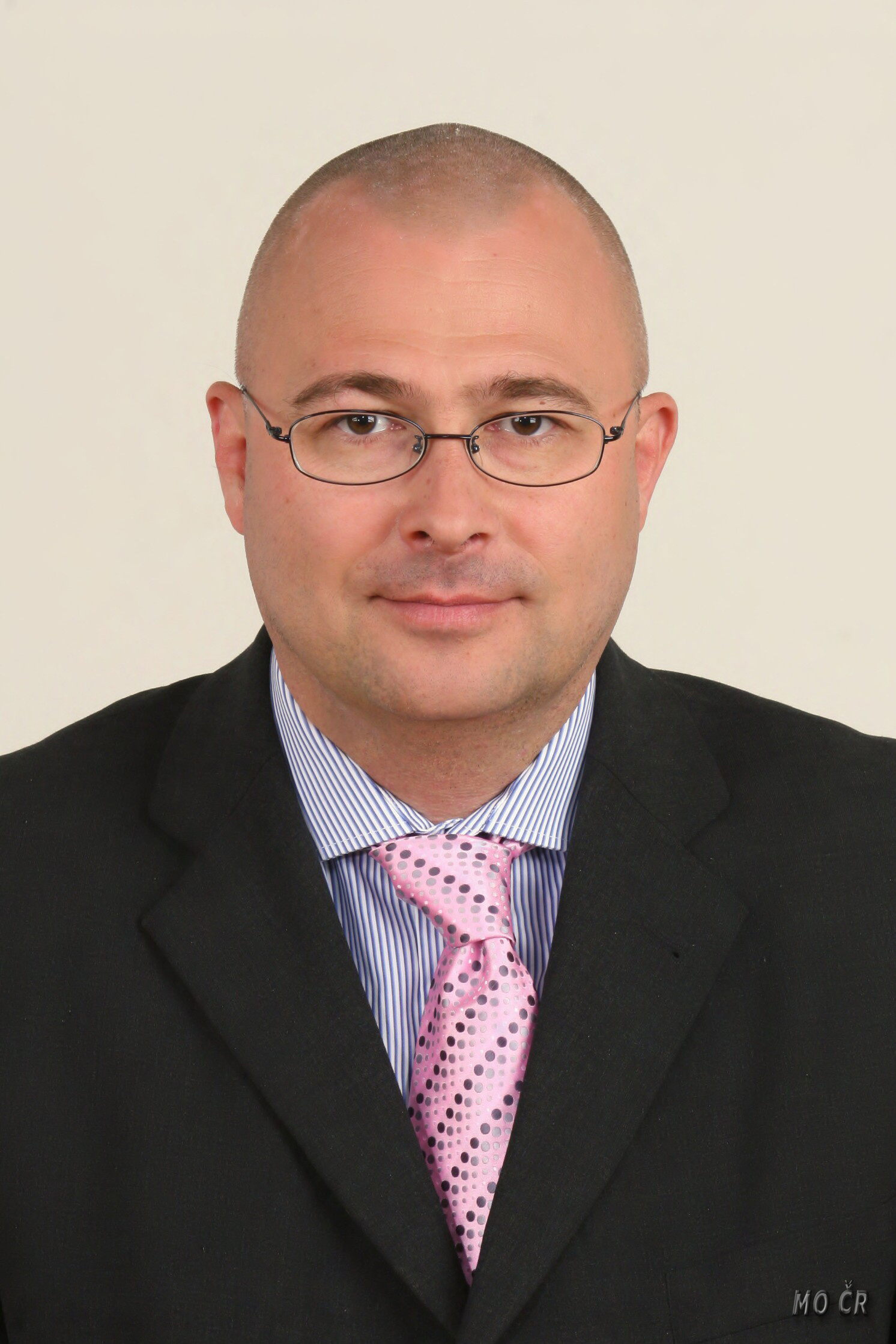

Minister of Defence
- In office 8 May 2009 – 13 July 2010
- Prime Minister: Jan Fischer
- Preceded by: Vlasta Parkanová
- Succeeded by: Alexandr Vondra

Personal details
- Born: 14 February 1967 (age 59) Prague, Czechoslovakia
- Profession: Medical doctor

Martin Barták (born 14 February 1967) is a Czech politician and medical doctor. He was the Minister of Defence in the caretaker government of Jan Fischer.
