= Chamber of Deputies of the Czech Republic =

Lower chamber of the Parliament of the Czech Republic

Coordinates: 50°05′21″N 14°24′14″E

Chamber of Deputies of the Parliament of the Czech Republic Poslanecká sněmovna Parlamentu České republiky
- 10th Legislature

Type
- Type: Lower house of the Parliament of the Czech Republic

History
- Founded: 1 January 1993

Leadership
- President: Tomio Okamura, SPD since 5 November 2025
- Deputy Presidents: List: Patrik Nacher, ANO 2011 since 5 November 2025; Jiří Barták, AUTO since 5 November 2025; Jan Skopeček, ODS since 14 November 2025; Barbora Urbanová, STAN since 5 June 2026

Structure
- Seats: 200
- Political groups: Government (107): ANO (79) (Note: ANO (75); Independent (4)); SPD (15) (Note: SPD (11); PRO (1); Svobodní (1); Tricolour (1); Independent (1)); AUTO (13) (Note: AUTO (6); Independent (7)); Opposition (93): ODS (27) (Note: ODS (26); Independent (1)); STAN (22) (Note: STAN (20); SLK (2)); Pirates (18) (Note: Pirates (16); Greens (2)); KDU-ČSL (16); TOP 09 (9); Non-attached (1) (Note: David Pražák was a member of ANO until October 2026.)
- Length of term: 4 years

Elections
- Voting system: Party-list proportional representation (Imperiali quota)
- First election: 31 May and 1 June 1996
- Last election: 3–4 October 2025
- Next election: By 2029

Meeting place
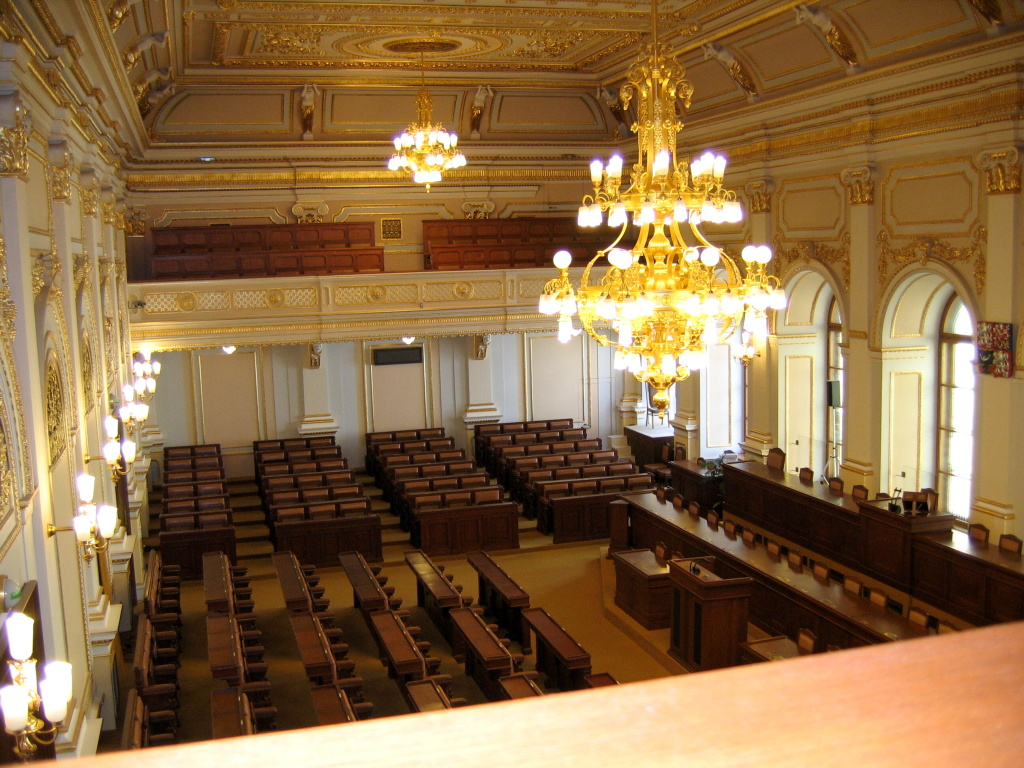
- Thun Palace in Malá Strana, Prague

Rules
- Rules of Procedure of the Chamber of Deputies

The Chamber of Deputies, officially the Chamber of Deputies of the Parliament of the Czech Republic (Czech: Poslanecká sněmovna Parlamentu České republiky, PS PČR), is the lower house of the Parliament of the Czech Republic. The chamber has 200 seats and deputies are elected for four-year terms using the party-list proportional representation system with the Imperiali and Hagenbach-Bischoff quotas. Since 2002, there have been 14 constituencies, matching the Czech regions, with district size varying from 8 to 26 representatives. A Cabinet is answerable to the Chamber of Deputies and the Prime Minister stays in office only as long as they retain the support of a majority of its members. The quorum is set by law to one third (67) of elected deputies. Any changes to the constitutional laws must be approved by at least 60 percent of the Chamber of Deputies. The seat of the Chamber of Deputies is the Thun Palace in Malá Strana, Prague.

== Electability and mandate ==
Every citizen of the Czech Republic over 21 years old with the right to vote is eligible to be elected. The Deputy may not hold the office of Senator, President of the Czech Republic or judge, which also applies to certain positions specified by law. The office of the Deputy expires once:

- a Deputy-elect refuses to take the oath or takes it with reservation
- a Deputy's tenure expires
- a Deputy resigns from the office
- a Deputy loses eligibility to be elected
- a Deputy takes up an office incompatible with serving as a Deputy.
- the Chamber of Deputies is dissolved

== Dissolution ==
After a dissolution of the Chamber of Deputies, new elections must be held within two months, and the Chamber of Deputies may not be dissolved less than three months before the end of its electoral term. The Chamber of Deputies can only be dissolved by the president under conditions specified by the constitution. The Chamber of Deputies is most commonly dissolved following two votes of no confidence in the cabinet. During a dissolution of the Chamber of Deputies, the Senate has the authority to take legal measures in its place if necessary.

== Seat of the Chamber of Deputies ==
The Chamber of Deputies resides in three building complexes in Malá Strana, Prague. The main building with the plenary chamber is the Thun Palace, built at the end of the 17th century. It was rebuilt at the start of the 19th century to house the Bohemian Diet. The current plenary chamber was built in 1861 for the reinstated Bohemian Diet after it was dissolved by the Austrian-Hungarian Emperor Franz Joseph I in 1849. The second building was the seat of the Governors of the Kingdom of Bohemia appointed by the emperor, located on Malá Strana Square. The last building complex includes the Smiřický Palace and Šternberk Palace at the opposite side of the square.

== Past Chamber of Deputies election results ==
3–4 October 2025	200 seats	Babiš III	ANO (government)	ODS KDU-ČSL TOP 09	STAN	Piráti	SPD (coalition)	AUTO (coalition)			
3–4 October 2025	200 seats	Babiš III	80 / 200 34.51% ▲8 (+6.72%)	52 / 200 23.36% ▼19 (-3.76%)	22 / 200 11.23% ▼11	18 / 200 8.97% ▲14	15 / 200 7.78% ▼5 (-1.78%)	13 / 200 6.77% (new)			
8–9 October 2021	200 seats	Fiala	ANO	ODS KDU-ČSL TOP 09 (government)	Piráti STAN (coalition)	SPD					
8–9 October 2021	200 seats	Fiala	72 / 200 27.12% ▼6 (-2.52%)	71 / 200 27.79% ▲29 (+5.36%)	37 / 200 15.62% ▲9 (-0.35%)	20 / 200 9.56% ▼2 (-1.08%)					
20–21 October 2017	200 seats	Babiš I Babiš II	ANO (government)	ODS	Piráti	SPD	KSČM	ČSSD (coalition)	KDU-ČSL	TOP 09	STAN
20–21 October 2017	200 seats	Babiš I Babiš II	78 / 200 29.64% ▲31 (+10.98%)	25 / 200 11.32% ▲9 (+3.59%)	22 / 200 10.79% (new)	22 / 200 10.64% (new)	15 / 200 7.76% ▼18 (−7.15%)	15 / 200 7.27% ▼35 (−13.09%)	10 / 200 5.80% ▼4 (−0.98%)	7 / 200 5.31% ▼19 (−6.69%)	6 / 200 5.18% (new)
25–26 October 2013	200 seats	Sobotka	ČSSD (government)	ANO (coalition)	KSČM	TOP 09	ODS	Úsvit	KDU-ČSL (coalition)		
25–26 October 2013	200 seats	Sobotka	50 / 200 20.46% ▼6 (−1.62%)	47 / 200 18.66% (new)	33 / 200 14.91% ▲7 (+3.64%)	26 / 200 12.00% ▼15 (−4.70%)	16 / 200 7.73% ▼37 (−12.50%)	14 / 200 6.89% (new)	14 / 200 6.78% (returning)		
28–29 May 2010	200 seats	Nečas Rusnok	ČSSD	ODS (government)	TOP 09 (coalition)	KSČM	VV (coalition)				
28–29 May 2010	200 seats	Nečas Rusnok	56 / 200 22.08% ▼18 (−10.24%)	53 / 200 20.22% ▼28 (−15.16%)	41 / 200 16.70% (new)	26 / 200 11.27% 0 (−1.54%)	24 / 200 10.88% (new)				
2–3 June 2006	200 seats	Topolánek I Topolánek II Fischer	ODS (government)	ČSSD	KSČM	KDU-ČSL (coalition)	SZ (coalition)				
2–3 June 2006	200 seats	Topolánek I Topolánek II Fischer	81 / 200 35.38% ▲23 (+10.91%)	74 / 200 32.32% ▲4 (+2.12%)	26 / 200 12.81% ▼15 (−5.7%)	13 / 200 7.23% ▼9 (−7.04%)	6 / 200 6.29% (new)				
14–15 June 2002	200 seats	Špidla Gross Paroubek	ČSSD (government)	ODS	KSČM	KDU-ČSL US-DEU (coalition)					
14–15 June 2002	200 seats	Špidla Gross Paroubek	70 / 200 30.20% ▼4 (−2.11%)	58 / 200 24.47% ▼5 (−3.27%)	41 / 200 18.51% ▲17 (+7.48%)	31 / 200 14.27% ▲11 (+5.28%)					
19–20 June 1998	200 seats	Zeman	ČSSD (government)	ODS	KSČM	KDU-ČSL	US-DEU				
19–20 June 1998	200 seats	Zeman	74 / 200 32.31% ▲13 (+5.87%)	63 / 200 27.74% ▼5 (−1.88%)	24 / 200 11.03% ▲2 (+0.7%)	20 / 200 8.99% ▲2 (+0.91%)	19 / 200 8.60% (new)				
31 May and 1 June 1996	200 seats	Klaus II Tošovský	ODS (government)	ČSSD	KSČM	KDU-ČSL (coalition)	SPR-RSČ	ODA (coalition)			
31 May and 1 June 1996	200 seats	Klaus II Tošovský	68 / 200 29.62% ▼8 (−0.11%)	61 / 200 26.44% ▲45 (+19.91%)	22 / 200 10.33% ▼13 (−3.72%)	18 / 200 8.08% ▲3 (1.8%)	18 / 200 8.01% ▲4 (+2.03%)	13 / 200 6.36% ▼1 (+0.43%)			

=== As part of the democratic Czechoslovakia ===
During this time the Chamber of Deputies was called the National Council.

5–6 June 1992	200 seats	Klaus I	ODS–KDS (government)	KSČM	ČSSD	LSU	KDU–ČSL (coalition)	SPR–RSČ	ODA (coalition)	HSD-SMS
5–6 June 1992	200 seats	Klaus I	76 / 200 29.73% (new)	35 / 200 14.05% ▲2 (+0.81%)	16 / 200 6.53% (new)	16 / 200 6.52% (new)	15 / 200 6.28% ▼5 (−2.14%)	14 / 200 5.98% (new)	14 / 200 5.93% (new)	14 / 200 5.87% ▼9
8–9 June 1990	200 seats	Pithart	OF (government)	KSČ	HSD-SMS (coalition)	KDU (coalition)				
8–9 June 1990	200 seats	Pithart	124 / 200 49.50%	33 / 200 13.24%	23 / 200 10.03%	20 / 200 8.42%				

== See also ==
- List of presidents of the Chamber of Deputies (Czech Republic)
- List of MPs elected in the 2025 Czech legislative election
- List of MPs elected in the 2021 Czech legislative election
- List of MPs elected in the 2017 Czech legislative election
- List of MPs elected in the 2013 Czech legislative election
- List of MPs elected in the 2010 Czech legislative election
- List of MPs elected in the 2006 Czech legislative election
- List of MPs elected in the 2002 Czech legislative election
- List of MPs elected in the 1998 Czech legislative election
- List of MPs elected in the 1996 Czech legislative election
