= First cabinet of Václav Klaus =

Václav Klaus' First Cabinet
- 1st Cabinet of Czech Republic
- 2 July 1992 - 4 July 1996
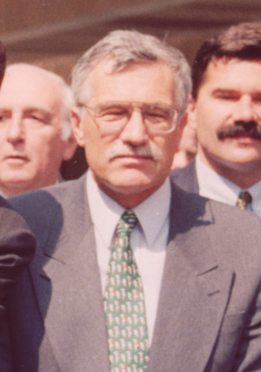
- Date formed: 2 July 1992
- Date dissolved: 4 July 1996

People and organisations
- Head of state: Václav Havel
- Head of government: Václav Klaus
- No. of ministers: 17-19
- Member party: ODS; KDU-ČSL; ODA; KDS
- Status in legislature: Majority (Coalition)
- Opposition party: KSČM; ČSSD; LSU; SPR-RSČ
- Opposition leader: Jiří Svoboda; Miroslav Grebeníček

History
- Incoming formation: 1992
- Outgoing formation: 1996
- Election: 1992 Czech legislative election
- Predecessor: Petr Pithart's Cabinet
- Successor: Second Cabinet of Václav Klaus

The first cabinet of Prime Minister Václav Klaus was in power from 2 July 1992 to 4 July 1996. The Czech Republic became an independent sovereign state on 1 January 1993 and thus this government was the first one after the dissolution of Czechoslovakia. It consisted of Civic Democratic Party (ODS), Christian and Democratic Union – Czechoslovak People's Party (KDU-ČSL), Civic Democratic Alliance (ODA) and Christian Democratic Party (KDS).

== Government ministers ==
Portfolio	Image	Name	Political Party
Prime Minister		Václav Klaus	ODS
Deputy Prime Minister		Jan Kalvoda	ODA
Deputy Prime Minister; Minister of Finance		Ivan Kočárník	ODS
Deputy Prime Minister; Minister of Agriculture		Josef Lux	KDU-ČSL
Minister of Defence		Antonín Baudyš^{1}	KDU-ČSL
Minister for Competition		Stanislav Bělehrádek	KDU-ČSL
Minister of Environment		František Benda (politician)	ODS
Minister of Transportation		Vladimír Budínský^{2}	ODS
Minister of Industry and Trade		Vladimír Dlouhý	ODA
Minister of Economic Policy and Development		Karel Dyba	ODS
Minister of Defence		Vilém Holáň^{3}	KDU-ČSL
Minister of Culture		Jindřich Kabát^{4}	KDU-ČSL
Minister of Health		Petr Lom^{5}	ODS
Minister of State Comptrol		Igor Němec	ODS
Minister of Justice		Jiří Novák	ODS
Minister of Education		Ivan Pilip^{6}	ODS
Minister of Education		Petr Piťha^{7}	KDS
Minister of Health		Luděk Rubáš^{8}	ODS
Minister of Interior		Jan Ruml	ODS
Minister for National Assets and Privatization		Jiří Skalický	ODA
Minister of Health		Jan Stráský^{9}	ODS
Minister of Culture		Pavel Tigrid^{10}	KDU-ČSL
Minister of Labour and Social Affairs		Jindřich Vodička	ODS
Minister of Foreign Affairs		Josef Zieleniec	ODS

== Notes ==
- ^{1} In office from January 1993 to 22 September 1994
- ^{2} In office from 10 October 1995 to 4 July 1996
- ^{3} In office from 22 September 1994 to 4 July 1996
- ^{4} In office from 2 July 1992 to 17 January 1994
- ^{5} In office from 2 July 1992 to 22 June 1993
- ^{6} In office from 2 May 1994 to 4 July 1996
- ^{7} In office from 2 July 1992 to 27 April 1994
- ^{8} In office from 23 June 1993 to 10 October 1995
- ^{9} In office from 10 October 1995 to 4 July 1996
- ^{10} In office from 19 January 1994 to 4 July 1996
