= Antonín Baudyš =

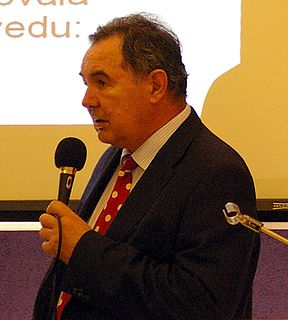
- A. Baudys in 2010

Minister of Defense
- In office January 1993 – 22 September 1994
- Prime Minister: Václav Klaus
- Preceded by: Office established
- Succeeded by: Vilem Holan

Deputy Prime Minister
- In office 1989 – July 1992

Personal details
- Born: 9 September 1946 Prague
- Died: 24 August 2010 (aged 63)
- Party: Czechoslovak People's Party; Christian Democratic Union - Czechoslovak People's Party
- Education: Czech Technical University

Antonín Baudyš (9 September 1946 – 24 August 2010) was a Czech academic and politician who served as defense minister from 1993 to 1994. He was the first defense minister of the Czech Republic.

== Early life and education ==
Baudyš was born in Prague on 9 September 1946. He studied mechanical engineering and graduated from the Czech Technical University (CVUT).

== Career ==
Baudyš worked as a university professor at his alma mater, CVUT, until 1989. He became a member of the Czechoslovak People's Party (CSL) in 1970. He was named deputy prime minister in 1989 shortly after the fall of communist regime and held the post until July 1992. He was appointed defense minister to the coalition cabinet led by Prime Minister Václav Klaus in January 1993. The ministry was formed with his appointment. He was a member of the Christian Democratic Union-Czechoslovak People's Party (KDU-CSL). On 22 September 1994, Vilém Holáň of KDU-CSL replaced Baudyš in the post.

Following his removal from office, he worked as a businessman and a popular astrologist.

=== Activities ===
One of his first activities as defense minister was to initiate the cleansing of the society from hard-liner communists and informers. He stated his aim as defense minister to transform the ministry into "an integrated civilian-military institution". During his tenure Baudyš was informed that the Czech army had had pathogens. He ordered the destruction of them due to the fact that they were no longer necessary.

== Personal life and death ==
Baudyš married twice. He had two sons from his first marriage. In May 2010, he divorced his first wife and married a woman who was 23 years younger than him.

He died at age 63 on 24 August 2010.
