= Pavel Kysilka =

Czech economist (born 1958)

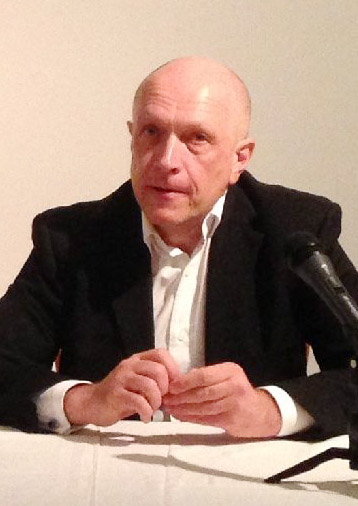
- Kysilka in 2015

Governor of the Czech National Bank
- In office 17 December 1997 – 23 July 1998
- President: Václav Havel
- Preceded by: Josef Tošovský
- Succeeded by: Josef Tošovský

Personal details
- Born: 5 September 1958 (age 68) Boskovice, Czechoslovakia
- Education: Prague University of Economics and Business
- Occupation: economist

Pavel Kysilka (born 5 September 1958) is a Czech economist. He was head of the Central Bank of the Czech National Bank from 1997 to 1998.

== Life and career ==
Kysilka was born on 5 September 1958 in Boskovice. He graduated from the National Economic Faculty of the University of Economics, Prague in 1982. Afterwards, he became a postgraduate at the same university. In 1986, he started at the Economic Institute of the Czechoslovak Science Academy, before in 1990, returning to the University of Economics, Prague.

From September 1990 to the end of 1991, he was an advisor to the Minister for Economic Politics and Local Affairs. Afterwards, he began as Deputy General Director to the Czechoslovak State Bank, the forerunner to the Czech National Bank. On 20 May 1992, he was named as vice-head of the Central Bank, a position he held when Czechoslovakia split into the Czech Republic and Slovakia in 1993, and Czech Republic's new Central Bank, Czech National Bank was established.

On 17 December 1997, head of the Central Bank, Josef Tošovský became Prime Minister in the Czech Republic's caretaker government which was formed by President Václav Havel, in the aftermath of Václav Klaus' minority government collapse in November 1997. Kysilka took over the role of head of the Central bank. On 22 June 1998, after the 1998 election, Tošovský went back to his role as head of the Central Bank, and Kysilka returned to being vice-head of the Central Bank. He continued in this role until 10 February 1999, and finished at the Central Bank on 30 September 1999.
