= Vlasta Parkanová =

Czech politician

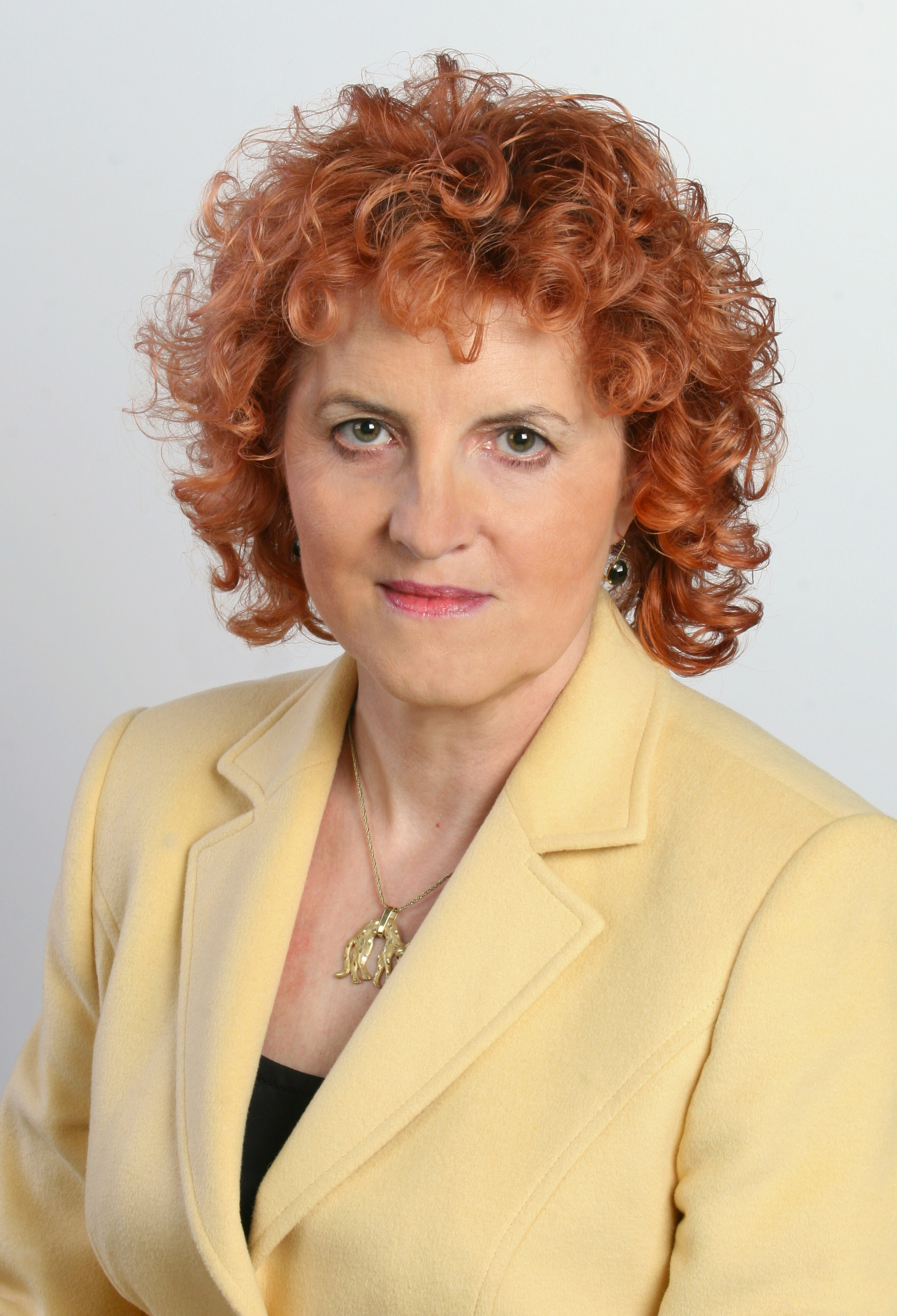

Minister of Defence
- In office 9 January 2007 – 8 May 2009
- Prime Minister: Mirek Topolánek
- Preceded by: Jiří Šedivý
- Succeeded by: Martin Barták

First Deputy Prime Minister of the Czech Republic
- In office 23 January 2009 – 8 May 2009
- Preceded by: Jiří Čunek (2007)
- Succeeded by: Karel Schwarzenberg (2010)

Minister of Justice
- In office 7 January 1997 – 22 July 1998
- Prime Minister: Václav Klaus; Josef Tošovský
- Preceded by: Jan Kalvoda
- Succeeded by: Otakar Motejl

Chairman of the Government Legislative Council
- In office 7 January 1997 – 2 January 1998
- Prime Minister: Václav Klaus
- Preceded by: Jan Kalvoda
- Succeeded by: Miloslav Výborný

Member of the Chamber of Deputies
- In office 2 December 1997 – 28 August 2013

Personal details
- Born: 21 November 1951 (age 74) Prague, Czechoslovakia
- Party: TOP 09
- Other party: OF(1989); ODA (1991-1998); KDU-ČSL (2001–2009)

Vlasta Parkanová, née Trnovcová (born 21 November 1951) is a Czech politician who served from January 2007 to May 2009 as the minister of Defence and shortly as minister of Justice between 1997 and 1998. She was member of the Chamber of Deputies (MP) from 1997 to 2013.

Parkanová is a graduate of the law faculty of Charles University in Prague, from 1975. She worked as a corporate lawyer from 1970 to 1990, mostly in agricultural organisations.
