= Ivan Pilip =

Czech politician and economist (born 1963)

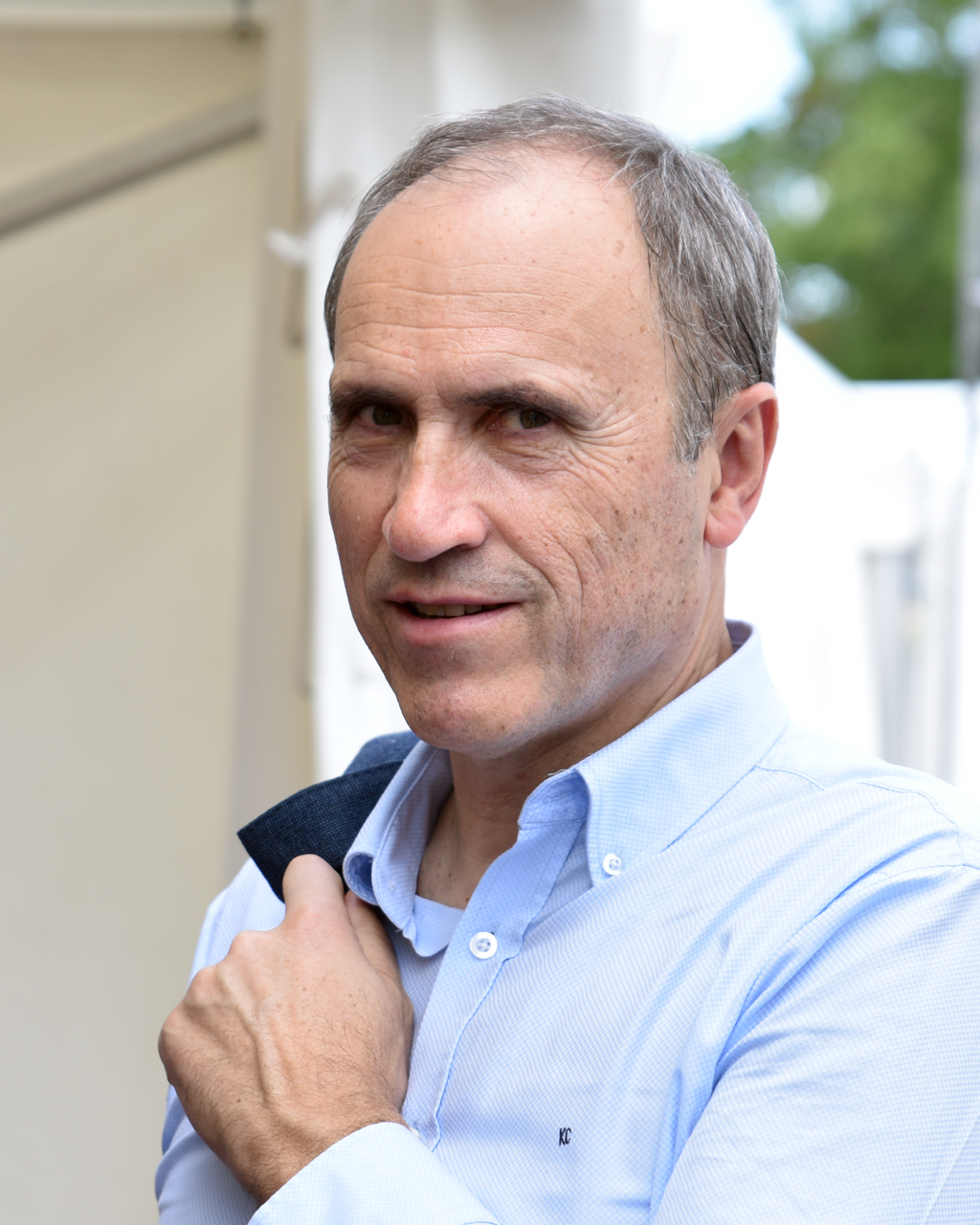

2nd Finance Minister of the Czech Republic
- In office 3 June 1997 – 22 July 1998
- Prime Minister: Václav Klaus; Josef Tošovský
- Preceded by: Ivan Kočárník
- Succeeded by: Ivo Svoboda

Minister of Education, Youth and Sport
- In office 1994–1997
- Prime Minister: Václav Klaus
- Preceded by: Petr Piťha
- Succeeded by: Jiří Gruša

Personal details
- Born: 4 August 1963 (age 63) Prague, Czechoslovakia
- Party: KDS; ODS; US–DEU
- Spouse: Lucie Pilipova
- Profession: Economist

Ivan Pilip (born 4 August 1963 in Prague) is a Czech politician and economist who was finance minister from June 1997 to July 1998, after having been the Minister of Education, Youth and Sport from 1994 to 1997.

Pilip was educated as an economist, before entering politics in the Christian Democratic Party (KDS) after the fall of Communism in the Czech Republic. Pilip served in government from 1992 to 1998, leading the KDS before it merged with the Civic Democratic Party. Pilip was among the deputies who split from the Civic Democrats to form the Freedom Union and in 1998 he went into opposition.

Pilip was detained in Cuba in early 2001 for almost a month after meeting opponents of the Cuban government, before being released after international pressure on Cuba. He lost his seat in the Chamber of Deputies in 2002, but would serve as interim leader of Freedom Union for a period afterwards, before serving as a vice-president at the European Investment Bank from 2004 to 2007.

== Early life ==
Ivan Pilip gained a degree in international business and trade at the University of Economics in Prague and did post-graduate studies at the Complutense University of Madrid. Before the Velvet Revolution at the end of 1989, Pilip was not involved in politics, having jobs at the university in Prague and at the Czechoslovak Academy of Sciences. However following the end of Communism in 1989 Pilip became manager of a medical equipment factory and joined the Christian Democratic Party after it was founded in 1990.

Pilip is married to Lucie Pilipova, who was a foreign ministry spokesperson, until she left the role when her husband became chairman of the KDS to avoid any conflict of interest.

== Political career ==
The KDS fought the 1992 Czech election in alliance with the Civic Democrats and became a junior partner in a coalition led by the Civic Democrats. In August 1992 Pilip was appointed deputy education minister in the coalition government, before becoming Education Minister in 1994, replacing Petr Piťha who had brought him into the government. Pilip was elected chairman of the KDS in December 1993, succeeding Vaclav Benda, after winning an election for the party leadership.

However, in 1995 the KDS agreed to merge with the Civic Democrats, with 5 of the 10 KDS deputies, including Pilip, joining the Civic Democrats. Pilip stayed as Education Minister after the merger, but became seen as a leading figure within the Civic Democrats, before becoming finance minister in the summer of 1997.

In the second half of 1997 pressure built on the prime minister Václav Klaus, over a donation to the Civic Democrats from a businessman who had recently gained a significant stake in a company privatised by the government. After the Foreign Minister, Josef Zieleniec, resigned in October 1997, Ivan Pilip called on Klaus to resign on 28 November and around the same time the 2 junior parties in the coalition quit the government. Klaus resigned as Prime Minister on 30 November and Pilip said he would challenge Klaus for the leadership of the Civic Democratic Party if no one else did. On 7 December a bomb exploded outside Pilip's house, causing no injuries, but alarming many. Klaus was re-elected as leader of the Civic Democrats, but Pilip continued on as Finance Minister, along with 3 other rebel Civic Democrats, in a caretaker government led by the Governor of the Czech National Bank, Josef Tošovský.

The rebel members of the Civic Democrats, including Pilip and 30 of the 69 deputies from the Civic Democratic Party, founded a new political party, the Freedom Union, under the leadership of the former interior minister Jan Ruml. However at the 1998 election Freedom Union only won 19 seats, compared to 63 for the Civic Democrats, with Ivan Pilip being one of the elected deputies. Following the election Freedom Union went into opposition, after the Czech Social Democratic Party formed a minority government, which was tolerated by the Civic Democrats.

== Arrest in Cuba ==
On 12 January 2001 Ivan Pilip and Jan Bubenik, a former student leader, were arrested in Ciego de Ávila in Cuba. The Cubans said this was because they had met Cuban dissidents on a trip partly funded by the American organisation Freedom House and as a result the Cuban authorities charged them with subversion. They were taken to a jail in Havana and Cuba threatened to keep them in prison for a long time, potentially up to 20 years, as an example to others.

The detention of Pilip and Bubenik caused international outrage, with countries in Europe and Latin America calling for their release, and relations between Cuba and the Czech Republic broke down over the issue. Meanwhile, Ivan Pilip's wife, Lucie, came to Cuba and met her husband while he was being detained in Havana and called for international help to obtain his release. However the Cuban government said they had been "conspiring against the revolution" and the official Communist Party newspaper, Granma, called them "agents working for the Cuban-American Mafia in the United States." At the beginning of February the president of the Czech Senate, Petr Pithart came to Cuba and met the Cuban leader, Fidel Castro, for six hours to try and obtain the release of Pilip and Bubenik. Pithart returned home on 4 February without Pilip and Bubenik, but he was later credited with paving the way for their release.

On 5 February Pilip and Bubenik were released after a meeting at the Cuban Foreign Ministry, where they admitted breaking Cuban law unwittingly. The meeting was attended by members of the Inter-Parliamentary Union, who said Pilip and Bubenik then left Cuba as tourists.

== Later career ==
At the 2002 election Freedom Union fought the election in an alliance with the Christian and Democratic Union – Czechoslovak People's Party, but the parties were reduced to 31 seats in the Chamber of Deputies, 8 down on what the parties had won separately in 1998. Pilip was not elected as a deputy, but as first deputy chairman of Freedom Union, became acting leader of the party after the resignation of Hana Marvanova during post-election talks on the formation of a new government. Freedom Union became a junior party in a coalition led by the Social Democratic Party, while Pilip remained acting leader of the party until Petr Mares was elected as the new leader in January 2003.

In June 2004 Pilip was appointed as one of eight vice-presidents of the European Investment Bank, the first from any of the states that joined the European Union in 2004. Pilip served a 3-year term as vice-president until the summer of 2007.
