= Ivo Svoboda (politician) =

3rd Minister of Finance
- In office 22 July 1998 – 20 July 1999
- Prime Minister: Miloš Zeman
- Preceded by: Ivan Pilip
- Succeeded by: Pavel Mertlík

Personal details
- Born: 6 April 1948 Czechoslovakia
- Died: 23 February 2017 (aged 68) Czech Republic
- Party: Social Democratic Party

Ivo Svoboda (6 April 1948 – 23 February 2017) was a Czech politician and economist who served as 3rd Finance Minister of the Czech Republic from 1998 to 1999 in government of Prime Minister Miloš Zeman. He became the first government minister of the Czech Republic to be imprisoned: he was handed a five-year jail term in 2005 and served three years of the sentence.

== Career ==
=== Early career ===
Svoboda started his political career as a Deputy in the Czech National Council (from 1990 to 1992). From 1997, he was the deputy chairman of the Board of the company Liberta, a manufacturer of baby transport based in Mělník. From 1997 to 1999, Svoboda served as the Deputy Chairman of the Czech Social Democratic Party.

=== Minister of Finance ===
Svoboda became the Minister of Finance in July 1998 as his party won the national election, following a campaign promising voters a corruption-free government. In July 1999, police announced their intention to start prosecution proceedings on criminal charges against Svoboda while he was still in the Cabinet. His term as Minister of Finance came to an end less than a week later, as he was sacked by President Václav Havel. Svoboda was sentenced to 5 years in prison in 2005 due to his involvement in tunneling of the Liberta company, becoming the first government minister following the Velvet Revolution to receive such a sentence. He was released from prison in October 2008, after having served three years of his sentence.

Svoboda died at the age of 68 on 23 February 2017, having suffered from Alzheimer's disease in the later years of his life.
