= University of Defence (Czech Republic) =

- Univerzita obrany
- Type: State
- Established: 2004
- Rector: Colonel Assoc. Prof. Ing. Jan Farlík, Ph.D.
- Location: Brno; Hradec Králové; 49.2075°N 16.5949°E
- Website: https://ud.unob.cz/

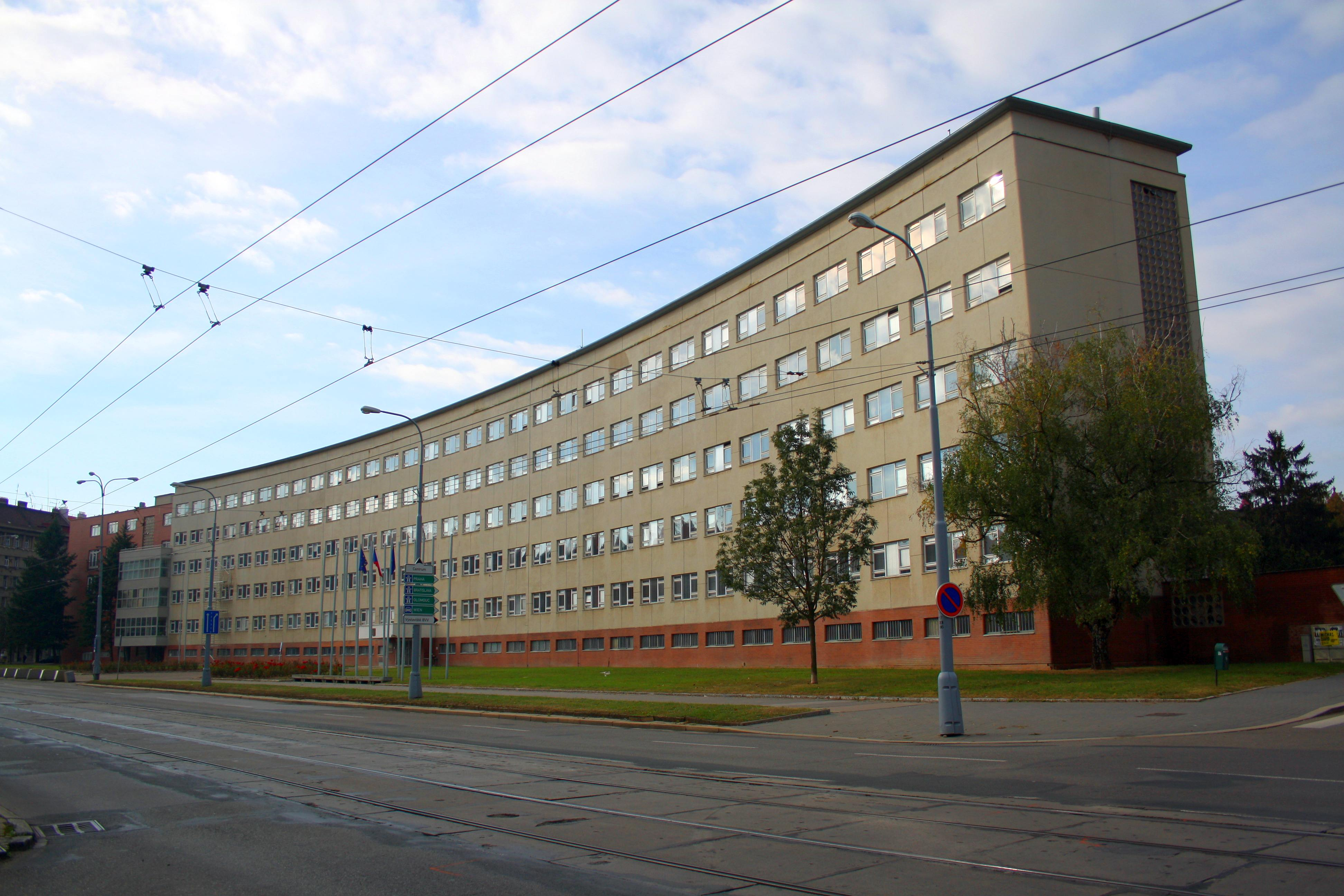
University of Defence building in Brno.

The University of Defence (Czech: Univerzita obrany, UO) is the military institution of higher education of the Czech Armed Forces. Established as of 1 September 2004, it was formed by merging three institutions: Military Academy Brno (established in 1951), the Military University of the Ground Forces Vyškov (established in 1947) and the Military Medical Academy Hradec Králové (re-established in 1988).

Unlike public universities, as a state institution with limited authority the University of Defence is the only university-type school in the Czech Republic that is not a legal entity but an element in the Ministry of Defence structure. Thus, the rights of the Minister of Education towards the public universities are performed by the Minister of Defence. University of Defence is responsible for education of military professionals and experts engaged in national security system, defence industry and public administration. The available Bachelor's, Master's and doctoral degree programmes, both in full- and part-time mode, focus on military and national security fields.

University of Defence represents the Army of the Czech Republic's defence and security research and development centre. The fields of science fostered at the University of Defence primarily relate to defence applied research, to forces and population protection, or the economics or medicine fields applied to military. It is the only Czech institute where subjects such as weapons and ammunition, fighting vehicles, radars, population protection, fire support control, field surgery, radiobiology or toxicology are taught.

== History of preceding academies ==
=== Military Academy of Technology ===
The Military Academy of Technology (MAT), which was established in 1951 at the time of radical reform of higher military education in the early 1950s.

In 1958, the Antonin Zapotocky Military Academy of Technology was united with Klement Gottwald Military Academy in Prague and renamed Antonin Zapotocky Military Academy (AZ MA). In 1966, the Army adopted the new framework of military personnel training and education.

== Faculties and institutes ==
The University of Defence consists of three faculties:

- Faculty of Military Leadership – Brno
- Faculty of Military Technology – Brno
- Faculty of Military Health Sciences – Hradec Králové

and an institute and three centres:

- NBC Defence Institute – Vyškov
- Security and Military Strategic Studies Centre - Brno
- Language Centre – Brno
- Physical Training and Sports Centre – Brno
