= Michal Lobkowicz =

Czech politician and geologist (born 1964)

Michal Lobkowicz (born 1964) is a former Czech politician and member of the Lobkowicz family. In 1998, he briefly served as defense minister in the cabinet of Josef Tošovský, at the age of 34, becoming the Czech Republic's youngest defense minister. He was a member of Civic Democratic Party but left it for Freedom Union due to its financial scandal, leaving politics in 2002.
