= Cabinet of Miloš Zeman =

Czech government (1998-2002)

Miloš Zeman's First Cabinet
- 4th Cabinet of Czech Republic
- 22 July 1998 - 15 July 2002
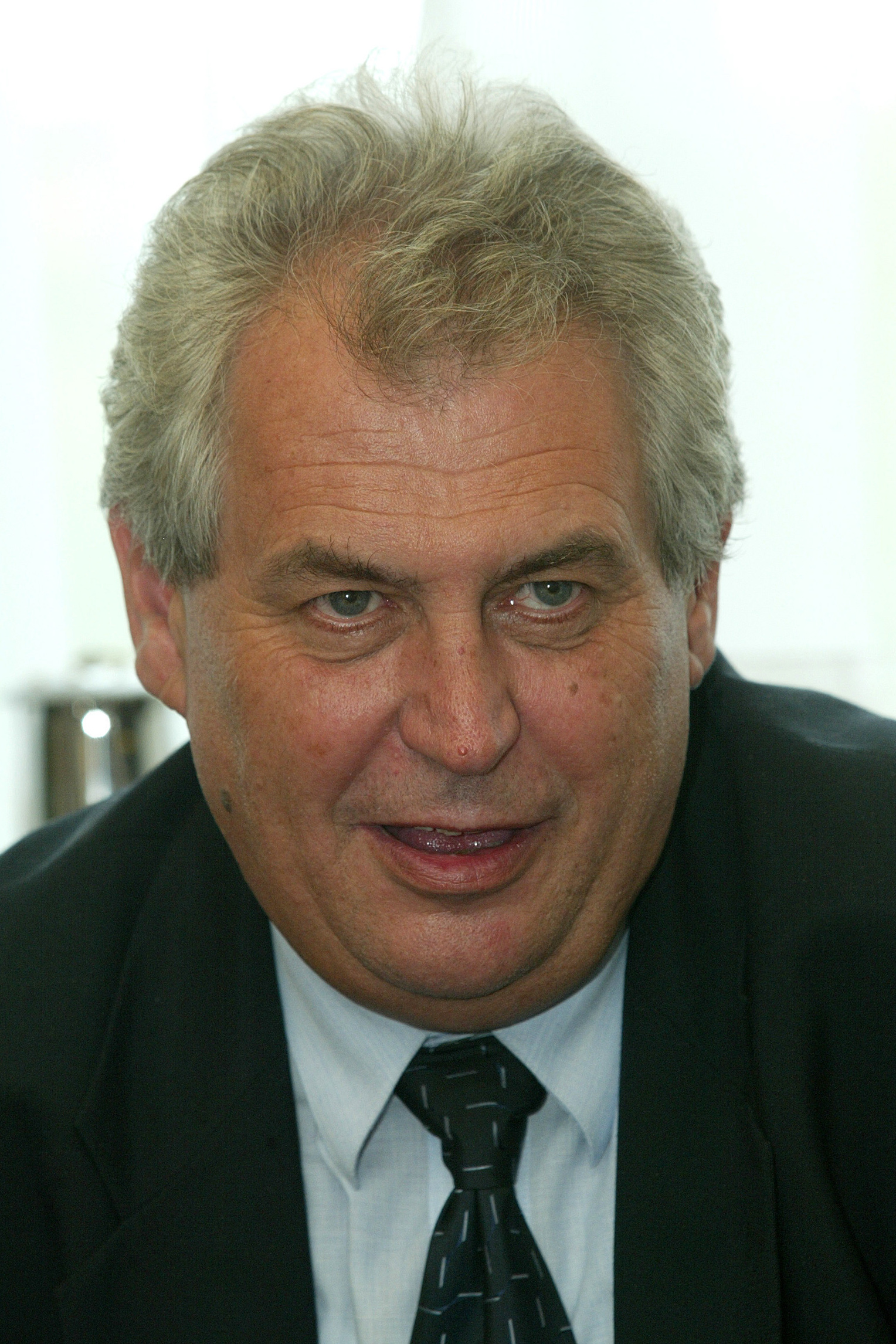
- Date formed: 22 July 1998
- Date dissolved: 15 July 2002

People and organisations
- Head of state: Václav Havel
- Head of government: Miloš Zeman
- No. of ministers: 15-16
- Member party: ČSSD
- Status in legislature: Minority
- Opposition party: Confidence and supply: ODS; Opposition: KSČM; KDU-ČSL US

History
- Incoming formation: 1998
- Outgoing formation: 22
- Election: 1998 Czech legislative election
- Predecessor: Cabinet of Josef Tošovský
- Successor: Cabinet of Vladimír Špidla

The cabinet of Prime Minister Miloš Zeman was in power from 22 July 1998 to 15 July 2002. It was a minority government of Czech Social Democratic Party. The government was supported by Civic Democratic Party as a result of Opposition Agreement.

== Government ministers ==
Portfolio	Name	Political Party
Prime Minister	Miloš Zeman	ČSSD
Deputy Prime Minister, Minister of Labour and Social Affairs	Vladimír Špidla	ČSSD
Deputy Prime Minister, Minister of Industry and Trade	Miroslav Grégr	ČSSD
Deputy Prime Minister, Minister of coordinating foreign, interior and defense	Egon Lánský	ČSSD
Deputy Prime Minister, Minister of Finance	Pavel Mertlík	ČSSD
Deputy Prime Minister	Pavel Rychetský	ČSSD
Minister of Justice	Otakar Motejl Jaroslav Bureš	non-partisan
Minister of Foreign Affairs	Jan Kavan	ČSSD
Minister for Regional Development	Jaromír Císař Petr Lachnit	ČSSD
Minister of Health	Ivan David Bohumil Fišer	ČSSD
Minister of Culture	Pavel Dostál	ČSSD
Minister for the Interior	Václav Grulich Stanislav Gross	ČSSD
Minister of Environment	Miloš Kužvart	ČSSD
Minister of Transport	Antonín Peltrám Jaromír Schling	ČSSD
Minister of Finance	Ivo Svoboda Jiří Rusnok	ČSSD
Minister of Defence	Vladimír Vetchý Jaroslav Tvrdík	ČSSD
Minister of Education	Eduard Zeman	ČSSD
Minister without Portfolio	Jaroslav Bašta Karel Březina	ČSSD
Minister of Agriculture	Jan Fencl	ČSSD

== Party composition ==
=== Government ===
Party	Ideology	Leader	Deputies	Ministers
ČSSD	Social democracy	Miloš Zeman	74 / 200	16 / 16
Total			74 / 200	16

=== Confidence and supply ===
Party	Ideology	Leader	Deputies
ODS	Conservatism	Václav Klaus	63 / 200
Total			63 / 200
