= Jan Kalvoda =

Czech lawyer and politician

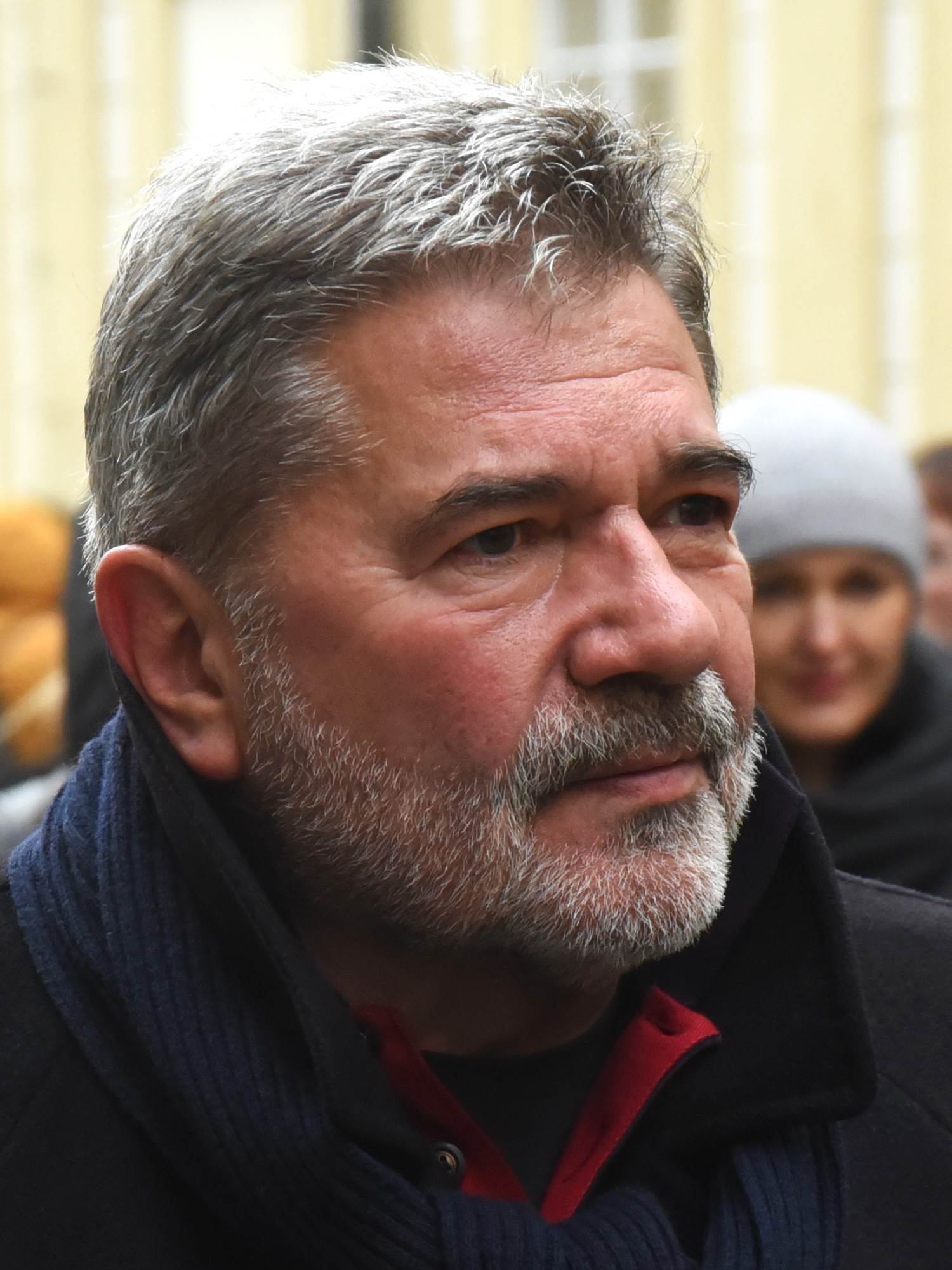
- Kalvoda in 2023

Minister of Justice
- In office 4 July 1996 – 7 January 1997
- Prime Minister: Václav Klaus
- Preceded by: Jiří Novák
- Succeeded by: Vlasta Parkanová

Leader of the Civic Democratic Alliance
- In office 28 March 1992 – 22 March 1997
- Preceded by: Pavel Bratinka
- Succeeded by: Michael Žantovský

Chairman of the Government Legislative Council
- In office 17 July 1992 – 7 January 1997
- Prime Minister: Václav Klaus
- Preceded by: Jiří Novák
- Succeeded by: Vlasta Parkanová

Member of Parliament for Prague
- In office 6 February 1990 – 17 December 1996

Personal details
- Born: 30 October 1953 (age 72) Prague, Czechoslovakia
- Party: Civic Democratic Alliance (Until 1996)
- Education: Charles University

Jan Kalvoda (born 30 October 1953) is a Czech lawyer and politician. He led the Civic Democratic Alliance and served as deputy prime minister and justice minister in the 1990s.

== Early life ==
Jan Kalvoda was born on October 30, 1953, in Prague to a family of diplomats. He spent part of his childhood traveling outside Europe with his parents. He graduated from Na Zatlance Grammar School and from the Faculty of Law of the Charles University in Prague. After completing his studies, he did his compulsory military service, and started working as a Candidate Attorney in Rokycany.

== Career ==
Kalvoda is a lawyer by training. He was the chairman of the Civic Democratic Alliance (ODA) from 1992 to 1997. He resigned from office 17 December 1996, and Michael Žantovský became the ODA leader.

He served as deputy prime minister in the cabinet led by Prime Minister Václav Klaus from 2 July 1992 to 7 January 1997. He was in charge of the civil service and legislation. He was also justice minister in the cabinet from 1992 to 1996. He resigned from all of his posts in addition to his seat at the parliament on 16 December 1996. The reason for his resignation was that he lied about holding a PhD in law. Kalvoda admitted it.
