= Josef Lux =

Czech politician and agricultural minister from 1992 to 1996

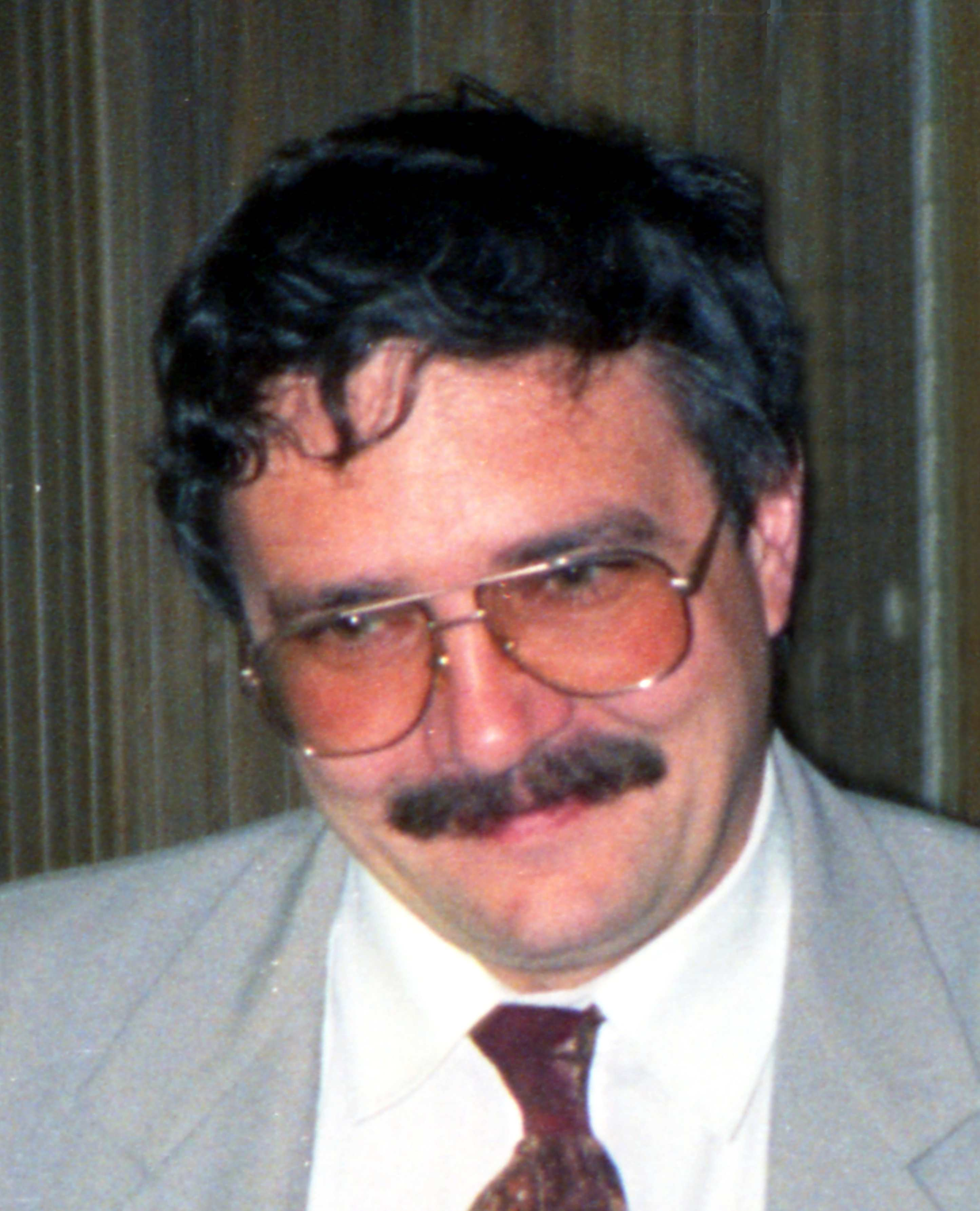
Josef Lux

Josef Lux (1 February 1956 in Ústí nad Orlicí – 21 November 1999 in Seattle, Washington) was a leader of the Christian and Democratic Union – Czechoslovak People's Party who entered politics after the Velvet Revolution. He became agriculture minister in 1992 as part of Václav Klaus' First Cabinet. He also served in Josef Tošovský's caretaker government. He had leukemia and died after a bone-marrow transplant.
