= Vilém Holáň =

Czech politician (1938–2021)

Vilém Holáň (23 September 1938 – 5 March 2021) was a Czech politician who served as Minister of Defense for KDU-ČSL from 1994 to 1996, during which he favored Czech accession to NATO. He was an observer to the European Parliament in 2003 and 2004. Holáň was born in Ostrava.
