= Josef Tošovský =

Czech economist and former governor of Czech National Bank

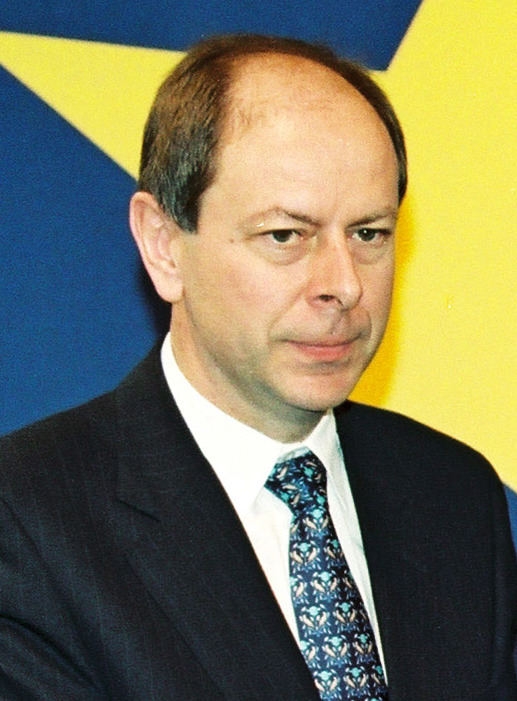

Prime Minister of the Czech Republic
- In office 17 December 1997 – 17 July 1998
- President: Václav Havel
- Preceded by: Václav Klaus
- Succeeded by: Miloš Zeman

Personal details
- Born: 28 September 1950 (age 76) Náchod, Czechoslovakia
- Party: Communist Party (1976–1989)
- Spouse: Bohdana Tošovská
- Children: 2
- Education: University of Economics, Prague

Josef Tošovský (Czech pronunciation: [ˈjozɛf ˈtoʃofskiː]) (born 28 September 1950) is a Czech economist and former governor of Czech National Bank (from 1993 to 2000). From 17 December 1997 to 17 July 1998 he was the prime minister of the Czech Republic in a caretaker government.

== Career ==
Tošovský studied international trade at the University of Economics, Prague from 1968 to 1973. After graduating, he was employed by the State Bank of Czechoslovakia, where he held a number of posts, including adviser to the chairman. He also worked in London during the 1980s at the branch office of Zivnostenska Banka. In 1989, he was appointed Governor of the State Bank. Following the split of the Czech and Slovak Federal Republic and the establishment of the Czech National Bank, he was appointed Governor of the Czech National Bank on 20 January 1993.

As Governor, Tošovský participated in drawing up the blueprint for economic reform and in implementing it in the monetary and banking areas. He took a leading part in drafting the legislative and institutional framework for the operation of the central bank in the market system, and oversaw the splitting of the Czechoslovak currency and central bank as part of the break-up of the state.

In response to the political crisis in the Czech Republic at the end of 1997, President Václav Havel appointed Tošovský Prime Minister of the Czech Government. On 22 July 1998, Tošovský was reappointed as the CNB Governor. Tošovský stepped down as the Governor of the CNB at the end of November 2000. Since 1 December 2000 he has been Chairman of the Financial Stability Institute at the Bank for International Settlements in Basel, Switzerland.

In August 2007, Russia nominated Tošovský to succeed Rodrigo Rato as head of the International Monetary Fund – as an alternative to the French candidate Dominique Strauss-Kahn. The Czech Republic immediately declared that it would not support Russia's nomination and would continue to stand behind the EU's one.

== State Security allegations ==
In January 2007, the daily newspaper Mladá fronta DNES accused Tošovský of having cooperated with the Czechoslovak State Security. The Czech Office for Foreign Relations and Information (ÚZSI, civilian intelligence) denied any conscious cooperation of Tošovský with the State Security. Mladá fronta DNES later stated that Tošovský mainly performed economic analysis for the State Security agency and never gave any information leading to arrests or prosecutions by the State Security.

== Other activities ==
Tošovský is an associate professor of the University of Economics, Prague and holds an honorary doctorate from Mendel University in Brno. He is a member of the board of the Centre for European Policy Studies, Brussels; a member of the Basel Committee on Banking Supervision; a member of the board of the Financial Services Volunteer Corps, New York and a member of the International Council of the Bretton Woods Committee, Washington.

Awards received by Tošovský include: Central Banker of the Year (1993), European Manager of the Year 2014 (European Business Press Federation), the Karel Engliš Prize for Economics at Masaryk University in Brno (1995), European Banker of the Year (Group 20+1, 1996), and the EastWest Institute Award for Leadership in Transition (2001).

Tošovský is married and has two daughters.

Government offices
New office	Governor of the Czech National Bank; 1993–1997	Succeeded by Pavel Kysilka
Preceded by Pavel Kysilka	Governor of the Czech National Bank; 1998–2000	Succeeded by Zdeněk Tůma
Political offices
Preceded by Václav Klaus	Prime Minister of the Czech Republic; 1997–1998	Succeeded by Miloš Zeman
