= Opinion polling for the 2003 Czech presidential election =

This page lists nationwide public opinion polls that have been conducted relating to the 2003 presidential elections in the Czech Republic.

== Lawmakers poll ==
SC&C made in February 2002 a poll among lawmakers to find out who has the highest chance to be elected. Václav Klaus (ODS) had support of 90% Civic Democratic Party lawmakers and 20% of Social democratic lawmakers. He was acceptable for 29% of Social democrats, 14% of Communists and 17% of Four-Coalition lawmakers. Petr Pithart (KDU-ČSL) polled second. He was supported by 67% of Four-Coalition lawmakers. He was acceptable for 50% of Social democrats, 20% of Communists and 12% of Civic Democrats. Miloš Zeman (ČSSD) had strong support in Czech Social Democratic Party and was acceptable for a large part of Civic Democrats and Communists. Independent candidates such as Václav Fischer had no chance according to the poll.

== Voting preference ==
=== Polls conducted in 2003 ===
Date	Agency	Václav Klaus Civic Democratic	Petr Pithart Christian Democratic	Otakar Motejl Social Democratic	Jaroslav Bureš Social Democratic	Miloš Zeman Social Democratic	Miroslav Kříženecký Communist	Jaroslava Moserová Civic Democratic	Jan Sokol Social Democratic
27 February	SC&C	60%	—N/a	—N/a	—N/a	—N/a	—N/a	—N/a	40%
27 February	SC&C	42%	9%	—N/a	—N/a	12%	—N/a	—N/a	11%
24 January		48%	—N/a	—N/a	—N/a	36%	—N/a	16%	—N/a
14 January	STEM	33.5%	33.5%	—N/a	23%	—N/a	10%	—N/a	—N/a
10 January	SC&C	50%	49%	—N/a	—N/a	—N/a	—N/a	—N/a	—N/a
10 January	SC&C	31%	21%	—N/a	16%	—N/a	6%	—N/a	—N/a
6 – 13 January	CVVM	—N/a	37%	37%	—N/a	—N/a	—N/a	—N/a	—N/a
5 January	TNS Factum	34%	17%	13%	10%	8%	—N/a	—N/a	—N/a

=== Polls conducted in 2002 ===
Date	Agency	Václav Klaus Civic Democratic	Petr Pithart Christian Democratic	Václav Fischer Independent	Otakar Motejl Social Democratic	Miloš Zeman Social Democratic	Rudolf Zahradník Social Democratic	Ivan Wilhelm Independent	Vladimír Železný Independent	Jiřina Šiklová Independent	Jaroslava Moserová Civic Democratic	Jaroslav Bureš Social Democratic	Miroslav Kříženecký Communist	Martin Potůček Social Democratic
1–5 November	STEM	26%	17%	—N/a	28%	11%	—N/a	—N/a	—N/a	—N/a	3%	8%	4%	3%
15 October	SC&C	27.6%	17.9%	—N/a	21.4%	10.2%	—N/a	—N/a	—N/a	—N/a	9.8%	8.3%	4.2%	0.6%
September	STEM	15%	19%	—N/a	27%	11%	6%	5%	4%	2%	—N/a	—N/a	—N/a	—N/a
29 January	TNS Factum	9.6%	8.0%	5.4%	—N/a	—N/a	—N/a	—N/a	—N/a	—N/a	—N/a	—N/a	—N/a	—N/a

=== Polls conducted in 2001 ===
Date	Agency	Petr Pithart Christian Democratic	Václav Klaus Civic Democratic	Václav Fischer Independent	Tomáš Halík Independent	Petra Buzková Social Democratic	Stanislav Gross Social Democratic	Miloš Zeman Social Democratic	Rudolf Zahradník Social Democratic	Jiřina Šiklová Independent
5–11 November	STEM	23%	17%	27%	12%	—N/a	—N/a	8%	10%	3%
15 March 2001	Sofres-Factum	11.6	7.3%	2.8%	3.6%	2.6%	2.2%	2.1%	—N/a	—N/a

=== Polls conducted in 2000 ===
Date	Agency	Václav Klaus Civic Democratic	Petra Buzková Social Democratic	Václav Fischer Independent	Stanislav Gross Social Democratic	Undecided
20 February	Sofres-Factum	11.5%	6.8%	4.1%	2.6%	50%

=== Media Surveys ===
Date	Survey	Sample	Václav Klaus Civic Democratic	Otakar Motejl Social Democratic	Petr Pithart Christian Democratic	Jaroslav Bureš Social Democratic	Miloš Zeman Social Democratic	Jaroslava Moserová Civic Democratic	Josef Jařab Independent	Miroslav Kříženecký Communist	Don't know
4 February 2003	iDnes	8,224	62.8%	—N/a	—N/a	—N/a	7.9%	22.1%	—N/a	—N/a	7.1%
10 January 2003	iDnes	113 Students	44.2%	3.5%	19.5%	12.4%	—N/a	—N/a	—N/a	6.2%	8.8%
26 September 2002	iDnes	20,445	37.4%	17.6%	12.8%	5.8%	4.9%	3.0%	1.6%	—N/a	16.9%

== Acceptability of candidates ==
Date	Agency	Otakar Motejl Social Democratic	Petr Pithart Christian Democratic	Václav Klaus Civic Democratic	Miloš Zeman Social Democratic	Jaroslav Bureš Social Democratic	Jaroslava Moserová Civic Democratic	Miroslav Kříženecký Communist	Martin Potůček Social Democratic
14 January	STEM	—N/a	65.5	47.5	—N/a	57%	—N/a	20%	—N/a
6–13 January 2003	CVVM	45%	37%	35%	29%	25%	16%	13%	4%
25 November - 2 December 2002	CVVM	46%	37%	31%	26%	21%	14%	6%	—N/a

== Direct or indirect election preference ==
Date	Agency	Direct	Indirect
5 January 2003	TNS Factum	87%	13%
25 November - 2 December 2002	CVVM	65%	26%
September 2002	STEM	85%	15%
April 2002	CVVM	57%	32%
5–11 November 2001	STEM	82%	18%
September 1999	STEM	82%	18%
September 1998	STEM	77%	23%
