= Faculty of Humanities, Charles University =

University faculty

Faculty of Humanities Charles University
- Fakulta humanitních studií Univerzity Karlovy
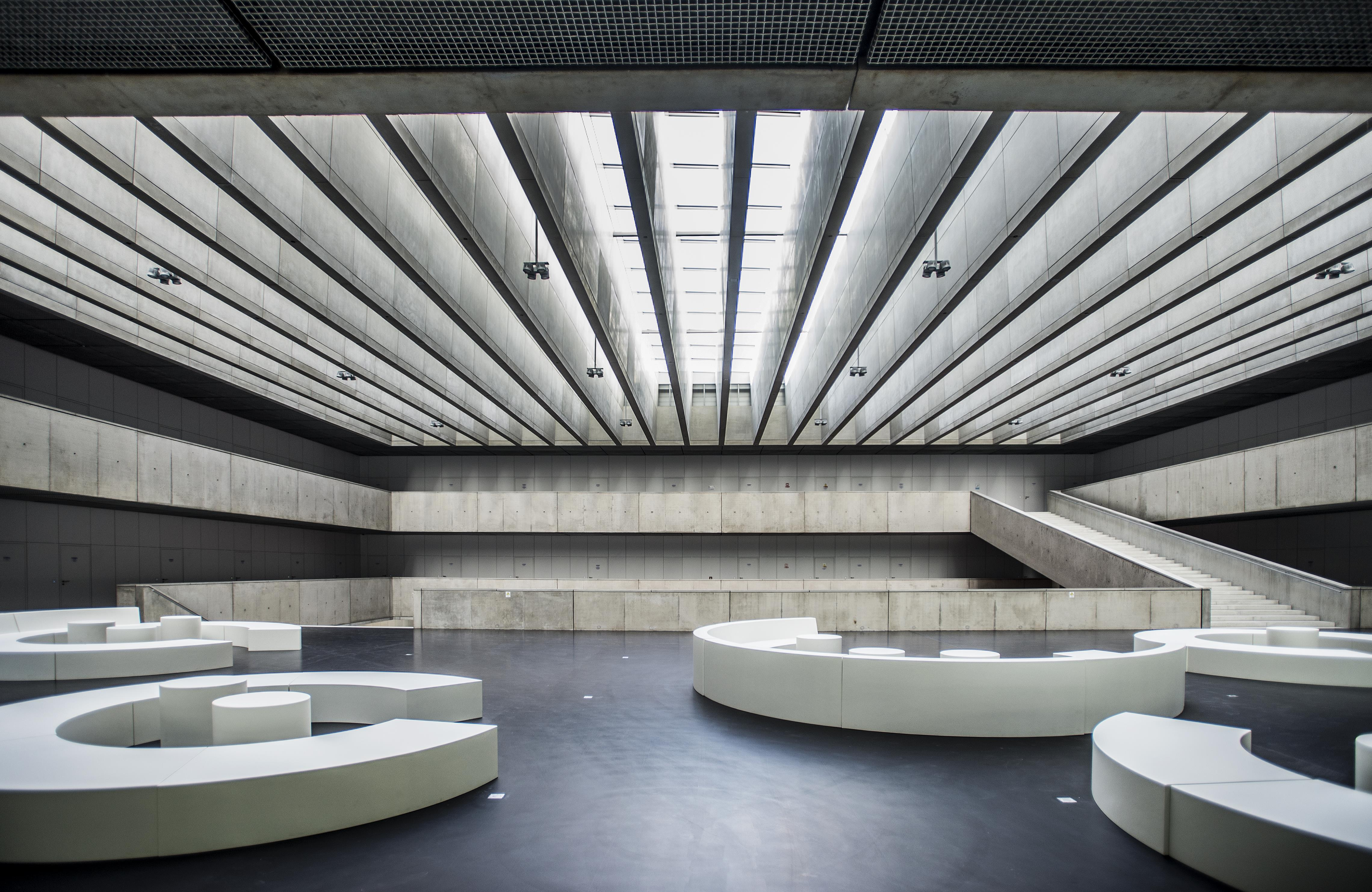
- Libeň building in Prague
- Latin: Facultas Humanitatum, Universitas Carolina Pragensis
- Former name: Institute for Liberal Education (Czech: Institut základů vzdělanosti)
- Type: Public
- Established: 2000; 26 years ago
- Affiliations: Charles University
- Dean: Marie Pětová
- Academic staff: c. 250
- Students: 3249
- Undergraduates: 2033
- Postgraduates: 840
- Doctoral students: 279
- Other students: 97
- Location: Prague, Czech Republic; 50.054296°N 14.368604°E
- Campus: Libeň
- Language: Czech, English, German, French
- Website: https://fhs.cuni.cz/

The Faculty of Humanities, Charles University (Czech: Fakulta humanitních studií Univerzity Karlovy) is a faculty of Charles University in Prague, Czech Republic. Located in Libeň, Prague 8, the faculty has about 220 internal employers and 3250 students.

It is a member of the European Colleges of Liberal Arts and Sciences.

== History ==
The Faculty of Humanities is the youngest faculty of Charles University. Founded as the Institute for Liberal Education (Czech: Institut základů vzdělanosti) in 1994, the faculty gained full academic autonomy in 2000.

The first dean of the faculty was the former Minister of Education Jan Sokol. Sokol ran for President of the Czech Republic in the 2003 election but lost to Václav Klaus. He was replaced in 2007 by Ladislav Benyovszky. The current acting dean is Marie Pětová.

In 2013, Czech President Miloš Zeman refused to approve the professorship of anthropologist Martin C. Putna at the faculty for Putna's involvement in Prague Gay Pride in 2011. After numerous protests from academic and broader circles, Zeman capitulated. Putna was appointed by the Minister of Education Petr Fiala in June 2013.

== Academics ==
The faculty's main research and academic focus is the humanities and social and cultural anthropology, including ethnomusicology, continental philosophy, gender studies, contemporary history, intellectual history and oral history.

=== BA ===
For undergraduates, the faculty offers a BA program in Liberal Arts and Humanities (Studium humanitní vzdělanosti). This program corresponds to the concept of liberal education. The student must achieve 60 ECTS credits in each year; they can freely choose lectures, seminars, etc. from the offer of the FHS and other faculties of Charles University. In addition, during the course of study, each student must pass three comprehensive exams in philosophy, history, and social sciences (anthropology, sociology, psychology, and economics), translate a professional text from the chosen foreign language (English, German, or French) and defend a bachelor's thesis.

=== MA ===
For master's students, the faculty offers MA programs in Anthropology, Deutsche und Französische Philosophie (taught in German), History of Modern European Culture, Semiotics, Gender Studies, Historical Sociology, Master Erasmus Mundus EuroPhilosophie (taught in German and French, joint degree with Autonomous University of Barcelona, University of Coimbra, Université catholique de Louvain, Université Toulouse 2 – Jean Jaurès, University of Memphis, Universidade Fédérale de Sao Carlos, and Bergische Universität Wuppertal), Oral History - Contemporary History, Social and Cultural Ecology, etc.

=== PhD ===
For doctoral students, the faculty offers three- or four-year PhD programs in Applied Ethics, Historical Sociology, German and French Philosophy (taught in German and French), General Anthropology, Semiotics and Philosophy of Communication, Social Ecology, Europäische Kulturzeitgeschichte (taught in German), Civic Society Studies, etc.

== Facilities ==
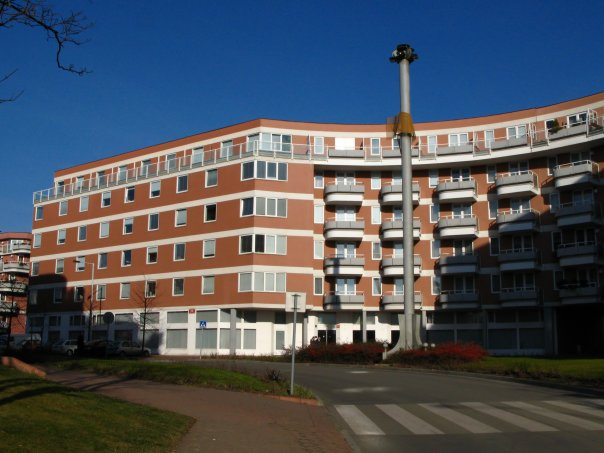
Old building in Jinonice, Prague 5

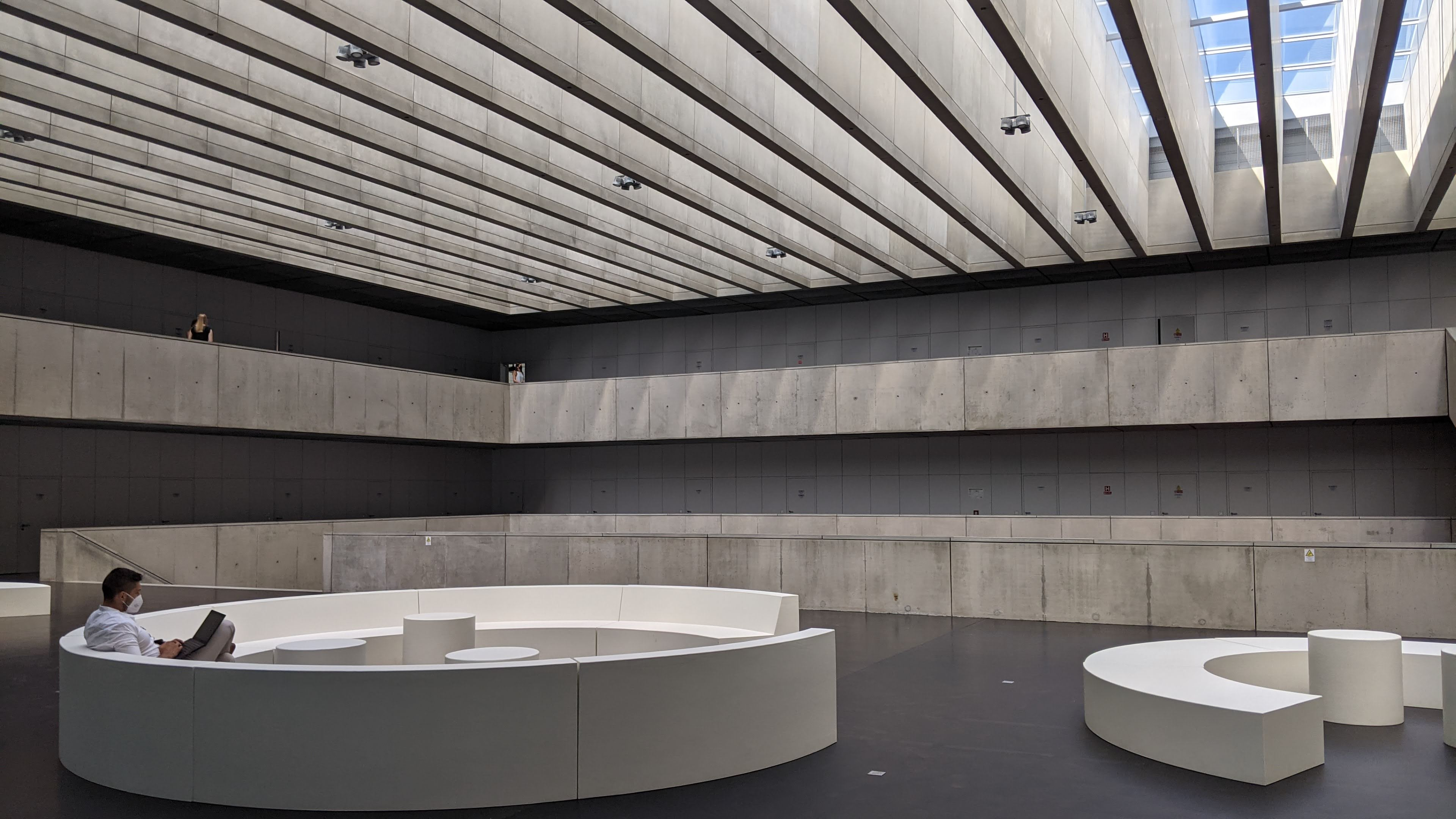
New building in Libeň, Prague 8

The IZV was located in the building of the Czech Academy of Sciences in Legerová street. At the same time as the faculty was founded in 2000, it moved to the new building of the Charles University in U Kříže 8, Jinonice, Prague 5, with two separate facilities, one in Hůrka district, Prague 13, and another at Máchova street 7, Prague 2. The faculty moved to a new building in Libeň, Prague 8 in 2020. The new building won a national architecture award in 2021.

Two research and educational institutions are operating within the Faculty of Humanities: the Research Center for Personality Development and Ethnicity, the Rehabilitation Institute for the Visually Impaired, and the Cabinet for Civic Democratic Education. Its three-floor library is located beneath the university building on Jan Palach Square by Staroměstská metro station.

== Departments ==
Departments of Faculty of Humanities, Charles University
In English	In Czech
Department of Philosophy	Katedra filosofie
Department of Historical Studies	Katedra historických věd
Department of Languages and Literature	Katedra jazyků a literatury
Department of Applied Social Sciences	Katedra aplikovaných sociálních věd
Department of Psychology and Life Sciences	Katedra psychologie a věd o životě
Department of Social and Cultural Anthropology	Katedra sociální a kulturní antropologie
Department of Sociology	Katedra sociologie
Department of Theory of Art and Artworks	Katedra teorie umění a tvorby
Doctoral Studies Office	Pracoviště doktorských studií

== Gallery ==
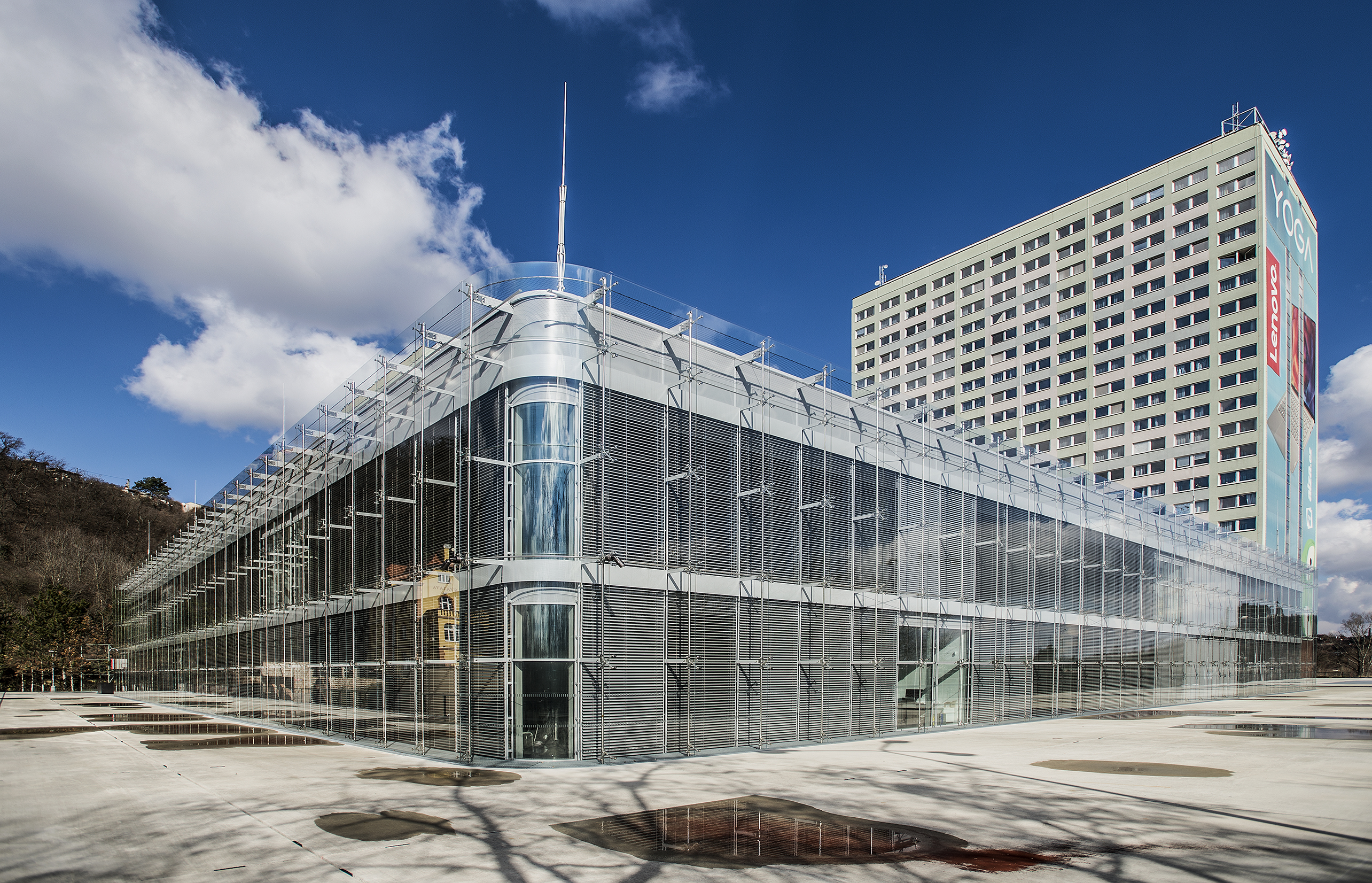

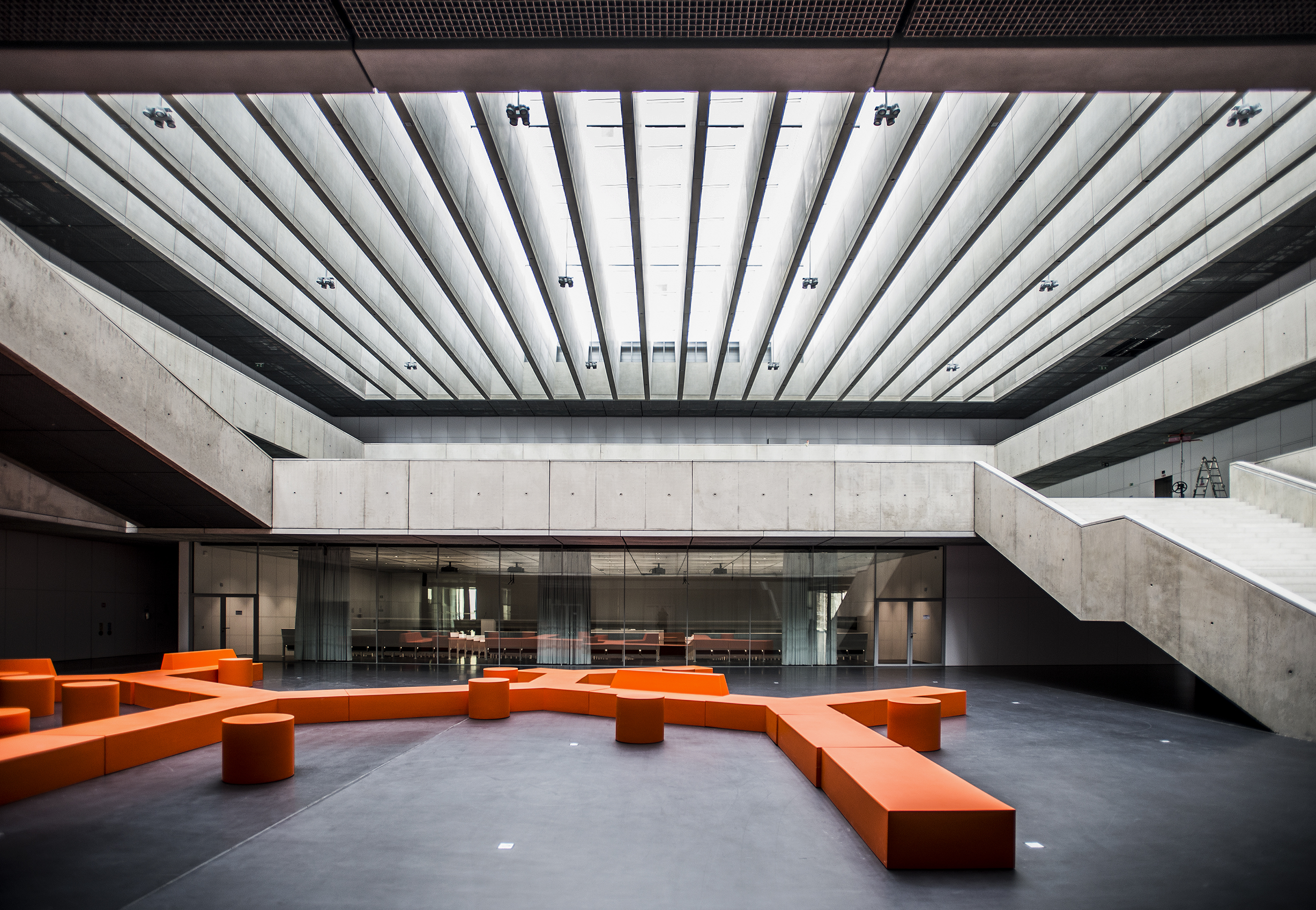

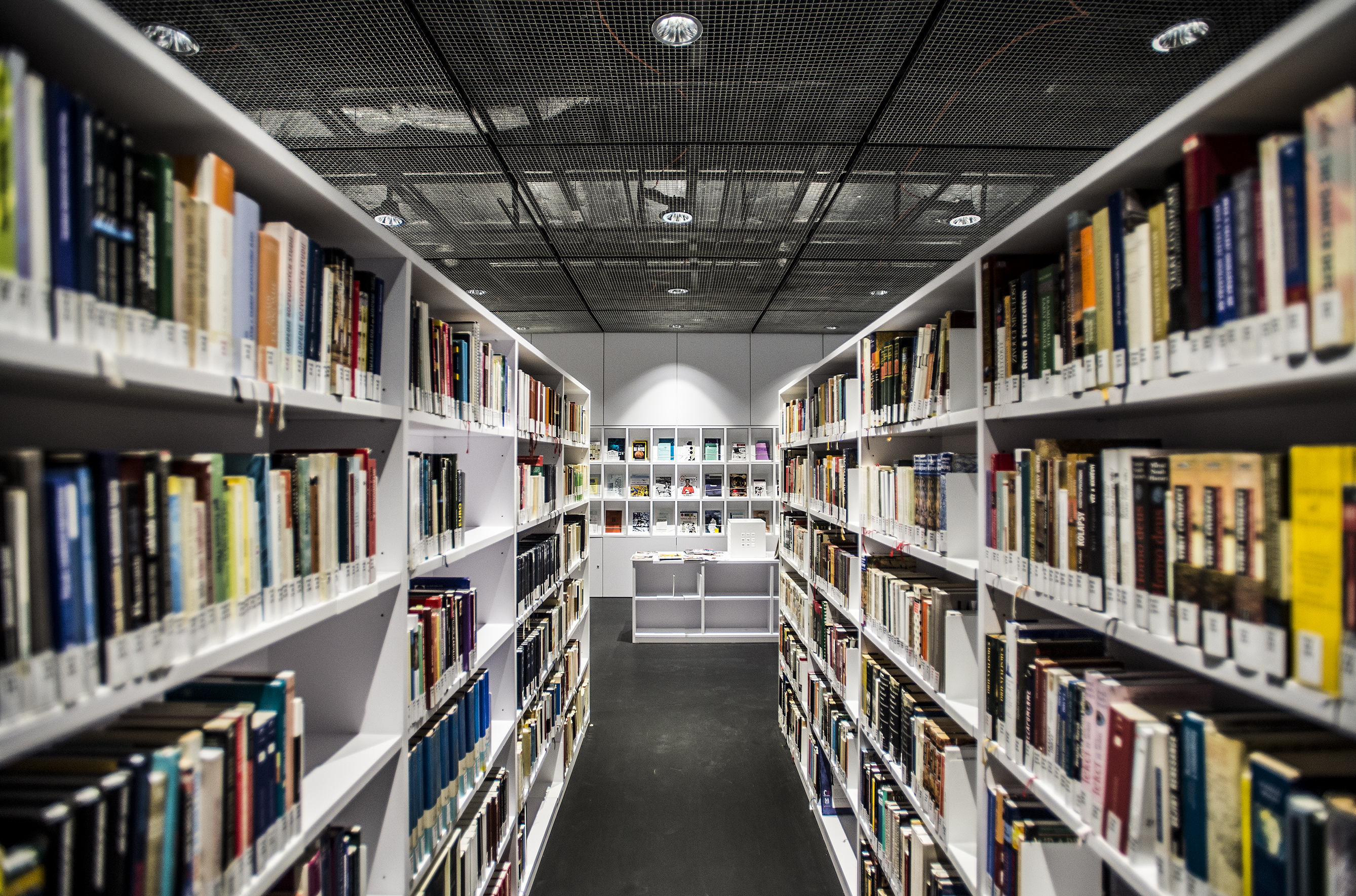

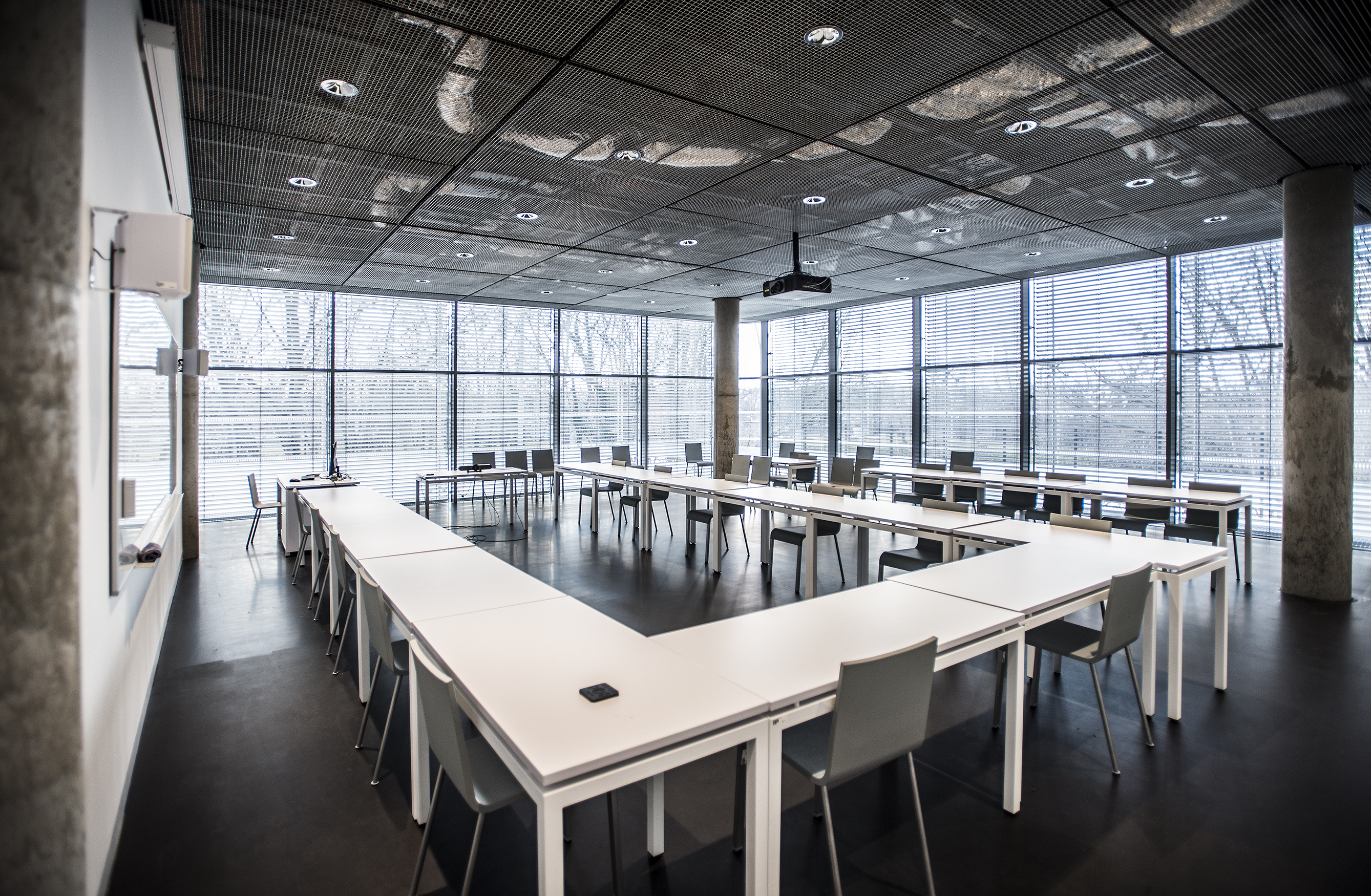

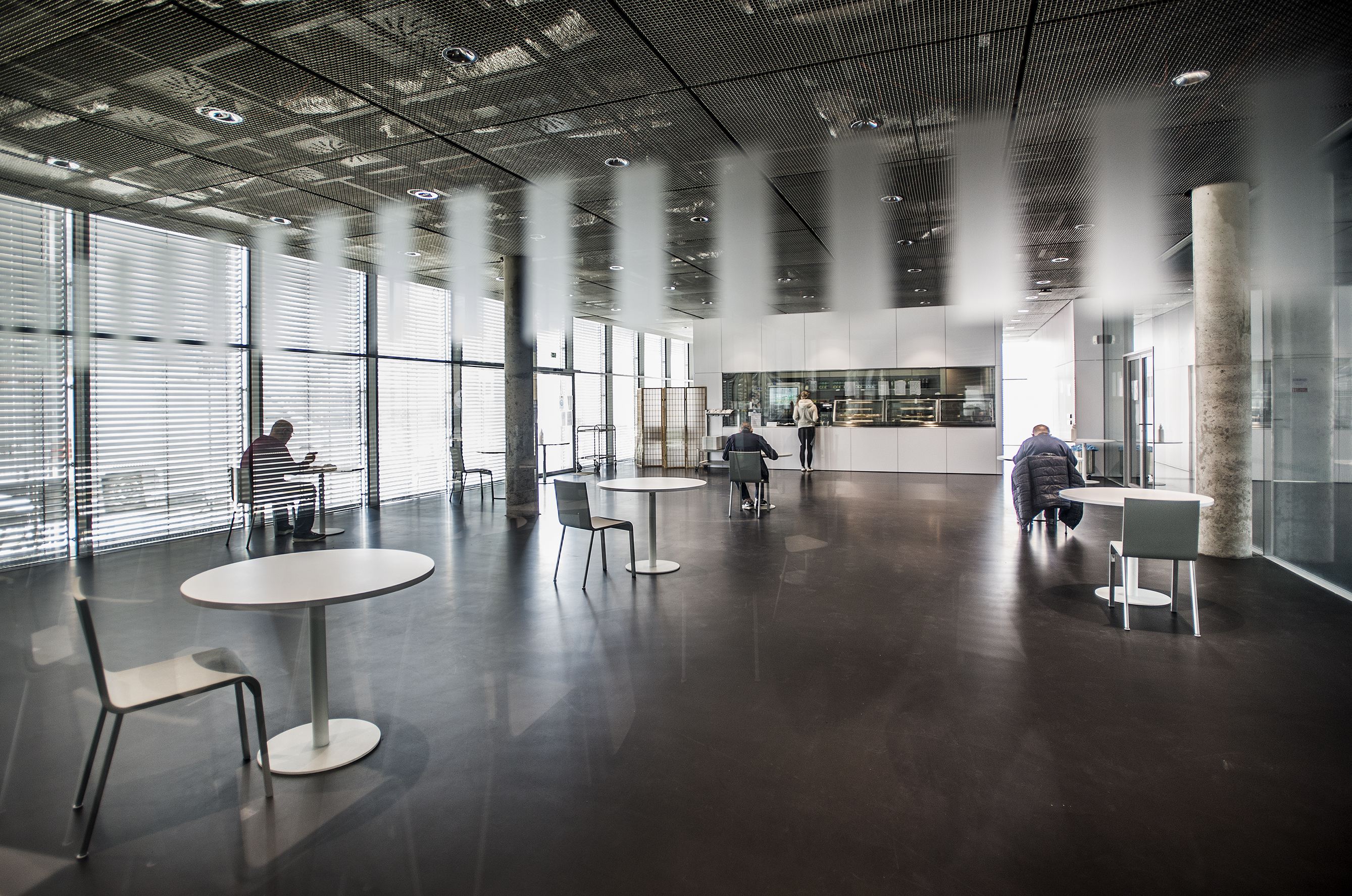

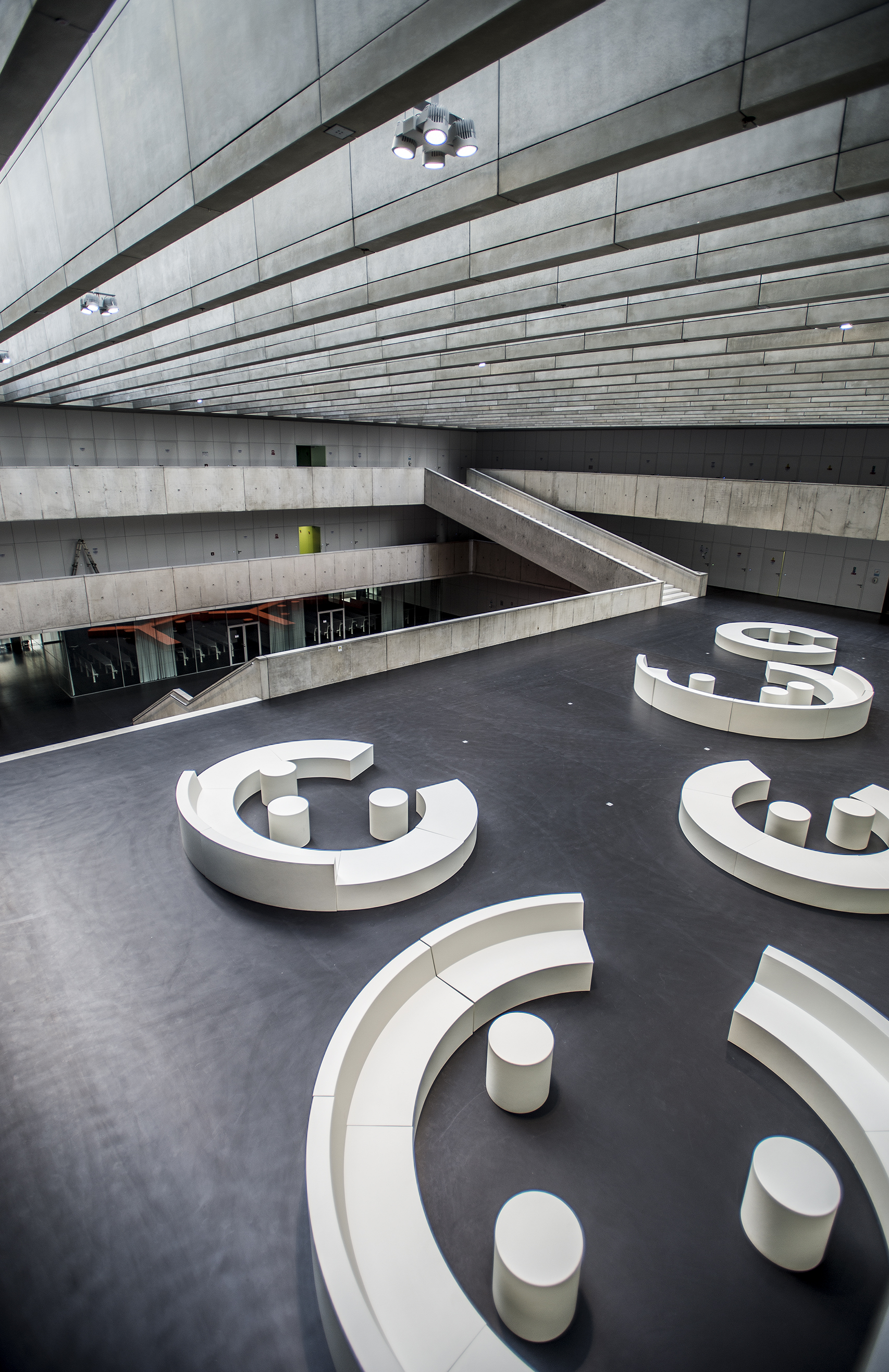

== Notable people ==
- Jan Sokol
- Ladislav Benyovszky
- Martin C. Putna
- Jaro Křivohlavý
- Petr Vopěnka
- Miloslav Petrusek
- Bedřich Moldan

== See also ==
- Faculty of Arts, Charles University
- Faculty of Mathematics and Physics, Charles University
- Hussite Theological Faculty, Charles University
- Faculty of Social Sciences, Charles University
- First Faculty of Medicine, Charles University
