= 2002 Czech Social Democratic Party presidential primaries =

- 22 October 2002 - 25 November 2002
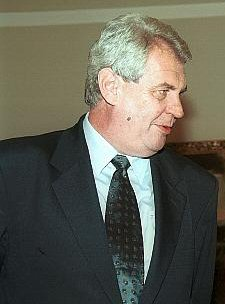

Nominee	Miloš Zeman	Jaroslav Bureš	Otakar Motejl
Party	ČSSD	Independent	Independent
Popular vote	12,836	6,428	5,323
Percentage	49.5%	24.8%	20.5%

Presidential primaries for the Czech Social Democratic Party were held between 22 October and 25 November 2002 in order to choose the party's candidate for the 2003 presidential election. Miloš Zeman received the highest number of votes. Other candidates were Jaroslav Bureš, Otakar Motejl and Otakar Potůček. Jakub S. Trojan was originally a 5th candidate.

== Candidates ==
- Miloš Zeman, former Prime minister of the Czech Republic and leader of ČSSD
- Otakar Motejl, Ombudsman and former Minister of Justice
- Jaroslav Bureš, Minister of Justice
- Martin Potůček, university professor, public policy analyst and journalist.

== Background ==
Leader of ČSSD Vladimír Špidla said after 2002 legislative election that party will have its own candidate. It led to speculations that such candidate could be Miloš Zeman who retired from politics at the time. Some prominent members of the party expressed their support for Zeman. Zeman's candidature wasn't supported universally. Some politicians such as Lubomír Zaorálek didn't like the possibility and wanted Otakar Motejl as party's candidate. Zeman's supporters included Zdeněk Škromach. Špidla's co-worker Součková mentioned that there is 3rd secret candidate. Debate about possible candidates led to speculations that party could hold a primary election to decide.

On 9 September 2002, Minister of Justice Jaroslav Bureš announced his candidature. He was offered the candidature by Stanislav Gross. Bureš was the first candidate to officially run. ČSSD announced decision to hold a primary on 26 September. Zeman announced his candidature on 30 September 2002. On 1 October 2002 the candidates were Miloš Zeman, Jaroslav Bureš, Otakar Motejl and Rudolf Zahradník. Martin Potůček joined the primaries on 20 October. Zeman Bureš and Motejl were considered the main candidates. Zahradník later withdrawn from primaries.

Primaries started on 22 October 2002. Otakar Motejl was considered the front-runner. He was leading according to the poll by STEM. Voting ended on 25 November. It was reported at the time that Zeman was leading the poll.

== Opinion polls ==
Date	Agency	Otakar Motejl	Miloš Zeman	Jaroslav Bureš	Martin Potůček
25 November 2002	Result	21%	49%	25%	5%
1–5 November 2002	STEM	31%	24%	12%	3%
15 October 2002	SC&C	17.9%	10.2%	8.3%	0.6%
September 2002	STEM	29%	18%	n/a	n/a

== Results ==
Candidate	Votes	%
Miloš Zeman	12,836	49.48
Jaroslav Bureš	6,428	24.78
Otakar Motejl	5,323	20.52
Martin Potůček	1,357	5.23
Invalid/blank votes	1,278	–
Total	27,222	100

== Result and aftermath ==
Miloš Zeman received the highest number of votes and won the primaries. However, the results of the vote were not binding and some politicians wanted to nominate Otakar Motejl who came third. Zeman agreed that he will not participate in the first round of voting in the presidential election, with the party selecting Jaroslav Bureš instead. It was planned that Zeman would become the party's candidate in the second round of voting, taking over from Bureš. However, Bureš was surprisingly eliminated in the first round.

== Controversy ==
Primaries were criticised for weak preparations. It was reported on 23 October that voters were able to participate repeatedly and there were falsified votes. Another point of controversy was turnout. ČSSD expected that masses of people would participate but the turnout was much lower.
