= Eduard Zeman =

Czech teacher and politician (1948–2017)

Minister of Education, Youth and Sports
- In office 22 July 1998 – 15 July 2002
- Prime Minister: Miloš Zeman
- Preceded by: Jan Sokol
- Succeeded by: Petra Buzková

Member of the Chamber of Deputies
- In office 1 January 1993 – 15 June 2006

Member of the Czech National Council
- In office 6 June 1992 – 31 January 1993

Personal details
- Born: 11 April 1948 Most, Czechoslovakia
- Died: 25 June 2017 (aged 69)
- Party: KSČ (1966–1970); ČSSD (1990–2009); Party of Civic Rights (2009–2017)

Eduard Zeman (11 April 1948 – 25 June 2017) was a Czech politician. He served on the Czech National Council from 1992 to 1993, and its succeeding legislative body, the Chamber of Deputies, until 2006. From 1998 to 2002, Zeman was the minister of Education, Youth and Sports.
