= Malšice =

- Market town
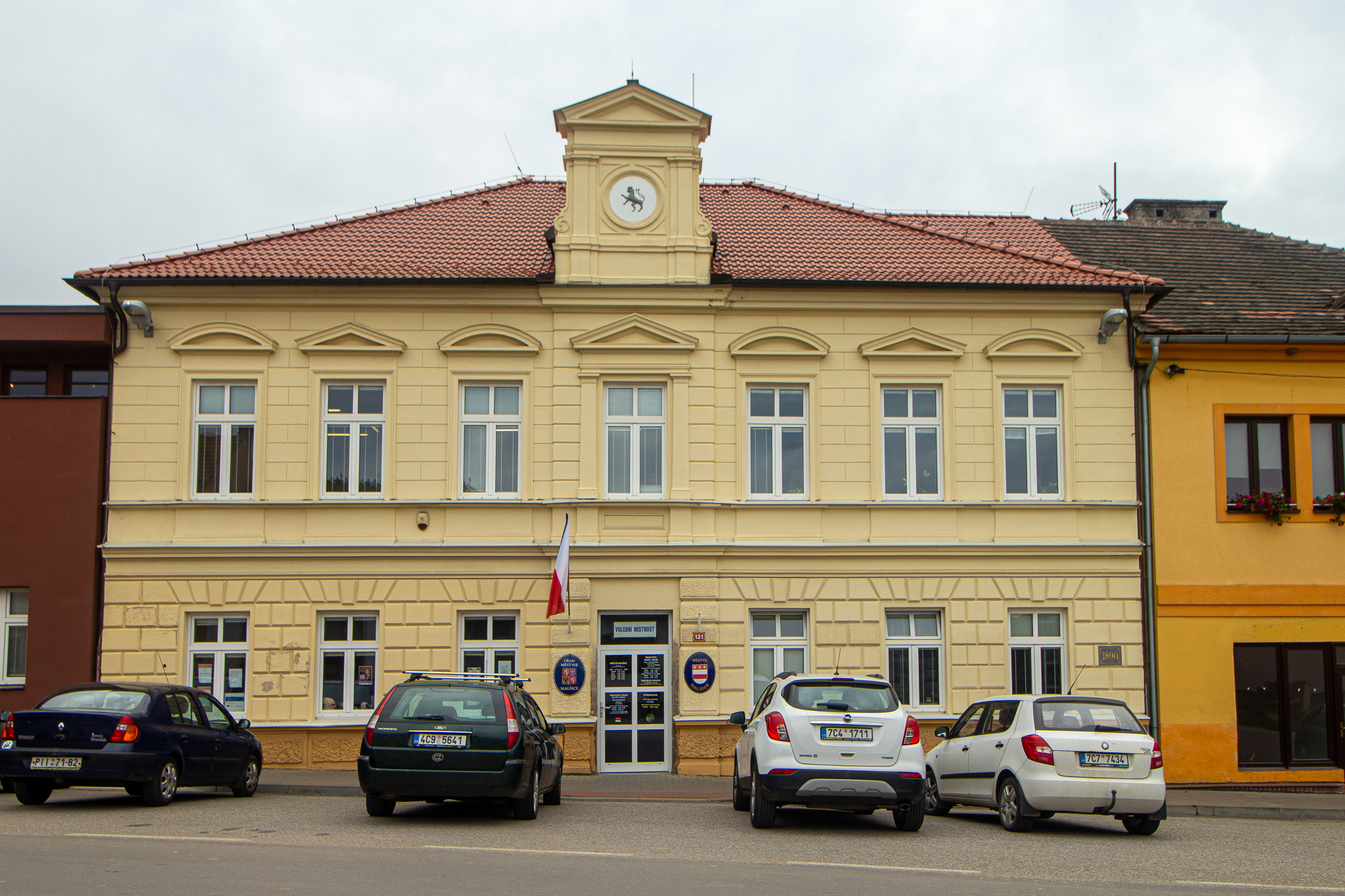
- Town hall

- Flag Coat of arms

- Location in the Czech Republic
- Coordinates: 49°21′50″N 14°34′43″E
- Country: Czech Republic
- Region: South Bohemian
- District: Tábor
- First mentioned: 1279

Area
  - Total: 38.61 km^{2} (14.91 sq mi)
- Elevation: 502 m (1,647 ft)

Population (2026-01-01)
  - Total: 1,880
  - Density: 48.7/km^{2} (126/sq mi)
- Time zone: UTC+1 (CET)
  - Summer (DST): UTC+2 (CEST)
- Postal code: 391 75
- Website: www.malsice.eu

Malšice (Czech pronunciation: [ˈmalʃɪtsɛ]; German: Malschitz) is a market town in Tábor District in the South Bohemian Region of the Czech Republic. It has about 1,900 inhabitants.

== Administrative division ==
Malšice consists of nine municipal parts (in brackets population according to the 2021 census):

- Malšice (1,081)
- Čenkov (236)
- Dobřejice (104)
- Maršov (100)
- Nové Lány (29)
- Obora (120)
- Staré Lány (23)
- Třebelice (83)
- Všechlapy (42)

== Etymology ==
The name Malšice is derived from the personal name Malša, meaning "the village of Malša's people".

== Geography ==
Malšice is located about 8 kilometres (5 mi) southwest of Tábor and 43 km (27 mi) north of České Budějovice. It lies in the Tábor Uplands. The highest point is at 524 m (1,719 ft) above sea level. The Lužnice River forms two sections of the municipal border in the west and north.

== History ==
The first written mention of Malšice is from 1279. It 1868, the village was promoted to a market town. The title, which was canceled in 1954, was returned to Malšice in 2008.

== Demographics ==
Historical population

Year	Pop.	±%
1869	2,750	—
1880	2,897	+5.3%
1890	2,700	−6.8%
1900	2,621	−2.9%
1910	2,424	−7.5%

Year	Pop.	±%
1921	2,336	−3.6%
1930	2,294	−1.8%
1950	1,997	−12.9%
1961	2,061	+3.2%
1970	1,909	−7.4%

Year	Pop.	±%
1980	1,919	+0.5%
1991	1,805	−5.9%
2001	1,702	−5.7%
2011	1,840	+8.1%
2021	1,818	−1.2%

Source: Censuses

== Transport ==
Malšice is located on the railway line Tábor–Bechyně.

== Sights ==
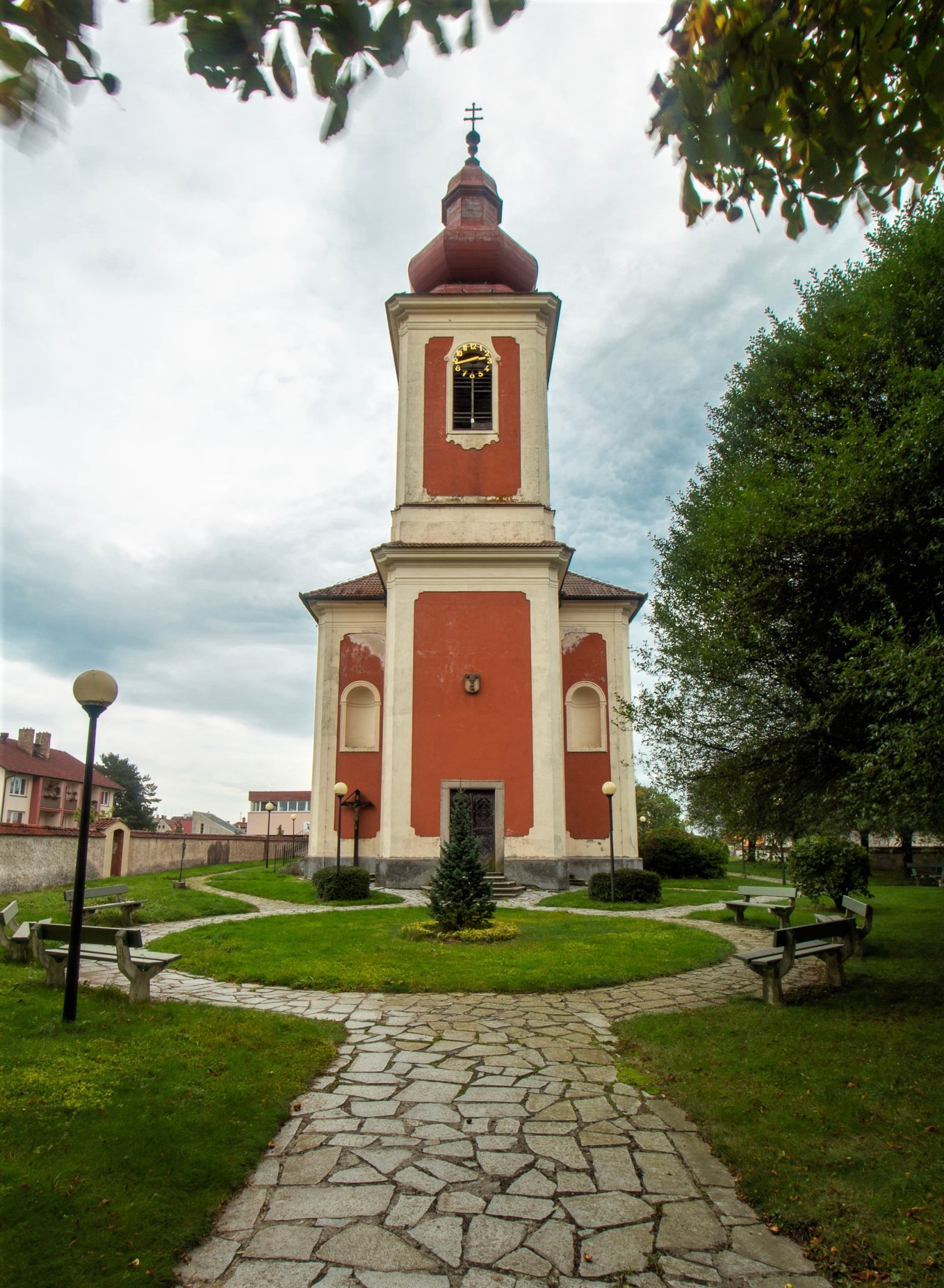
Church of the Holy Trinity

The main landmark of Malšice is the Church of the Holy Trinity. It was originally a Gothic church from 1373. In 1743–1745, it was rebuilt in the Baroque style.

== Notable people ==
- Miroslav Kříženecký (born 1946), lawyer and politician
