= Martin Potůček =

Czech academic and journalist

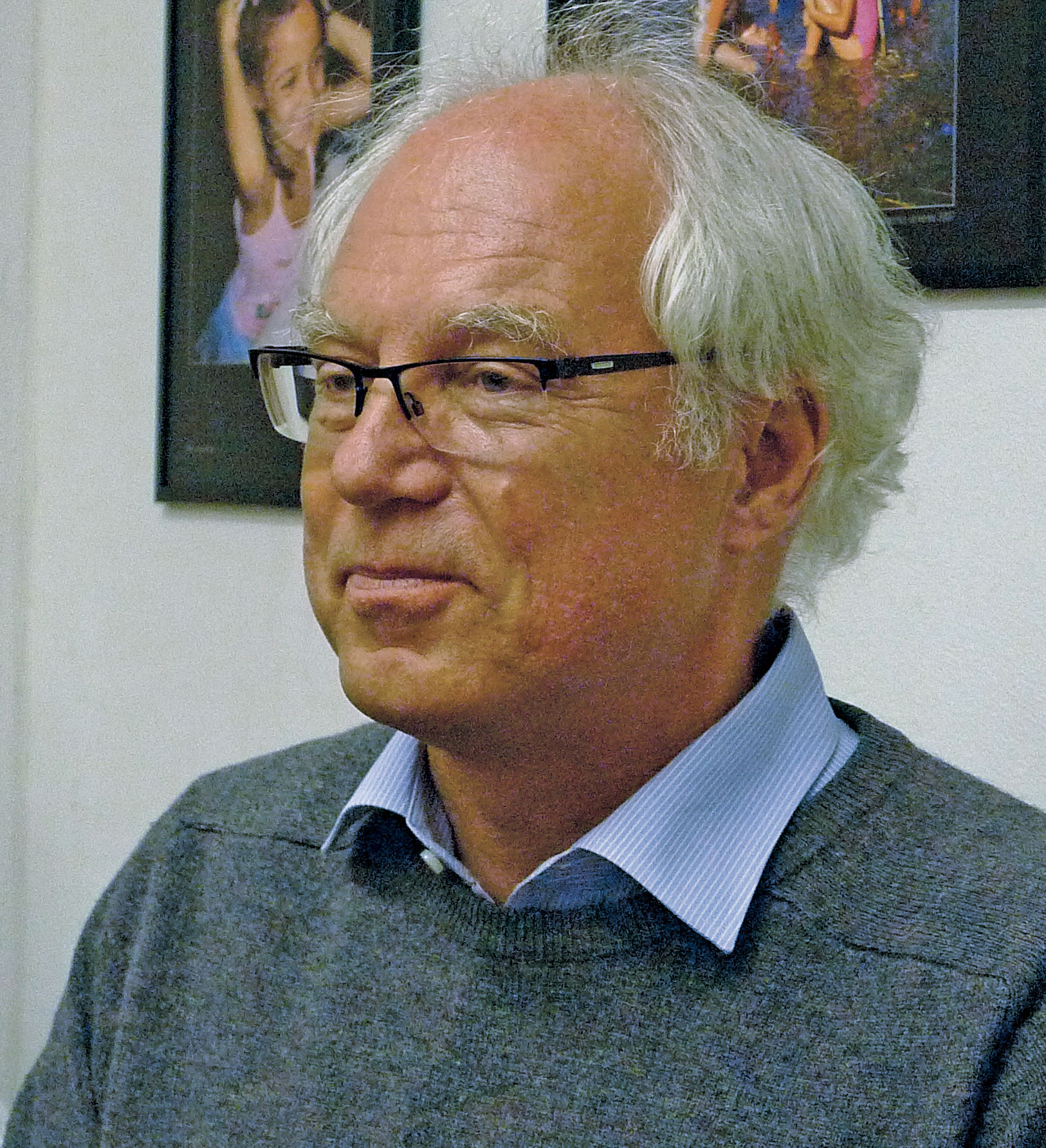
- Czech university professor, public policy analyst, journalist
- Born: September 2, 1948 (age 77); Brno, Czechoslovakia
- Education: Masaryk University Charles University

Martin Potůček is Czech academic and journalist.

== Education ==
Potůček studied philosophy, mathematics, political science, and sociology at Masaryk University in Brno. He worked as a researcher at the Department of Complex Modelling, Sportpropag, and later in the Institute of Social Medicine and Organisation of Health Services in Prague, until 1989. He received his Ph.D. in management theory in 1989 from the University of Economics, Prague. He subsequently studied at the London School of Economics, receiving an M.Sc. in European social policy in 1991, and participated in a number of professional fellowship and exchange programs, including with the Eisenhower Exchange Fellowship in the United States (1992), Oxford University (1993–1994), the University of Konstanz (1997–2000), the Institute of Human Sciences in Vienna (1998) and Central European University in Budapest (1998–2000).

== Career ==
In 1990 Potůček joined the newly established faculty of social sciences at the Charles University in Prague. He habilitated there in 1992 as associate professor of sociology. In 1999, he became full professor of public and social policy on the new study program he had co-founded. He served as the director of the Institute of Sociological Studies at the same faculty from 1994 to 2003. He established and has run the Center for Social and Economic Strategies there since 2000.

Potůček was elected chairman of the Masaryk Czech Sociological Association in 1995 (vice-chairman, 1994 and 1996) and member of the steering committee of the Network of Institutes and Schools of Public Administration in Central and Eastern Europe (NISPAcee) in 1997. In 2000-2002, he acted as the elected president of this international nonprofit association. He served as the first vice-chairman of the Research and Development Council of the Government of the Czech Republic (1999–2004). He acted as permanent guest professor at the University of Konstanz, Germany (2002–2008). He served as an advisor to Ministers of Labour and Social Affairs (1998–2006) and to the prime minister of the Czech Republic (2002–2004). He has been awarded the Sri Chinmoy International Honour "Lifting Up the World with a Oneness-Heart" (2003) and the NISPAcee Alena Brunovska Award (2004) for teaching excellence in public administration. Since 2008 and from 2004 to 2005 he was a member of Committee for Social Sciences and Humanities, Research and Development Council of the Czech Government.

Potůček ran for Czech president in 2003. He sought the nomination of the Czech Social Democratic Party, but came fourth in the party's presidential primaries and was not nominated.

== Bibliography ==
His work focuses on the teleonomic qualities of differentiated social actors, processes of cultivating and utilising human potential, and factors influencing health and health policy, as well as the processes of public policy formulation and implementation in the Czech Republic. He has published 23 scientific books and three textbooks.

=== Books ===
- Potůček, M.: Nejen trh. Role trhu, státu a občanského sektoru v proměnách české společnosti. Praha, Sociologické nakladatelství 1997. 188 s. ISBN 80-85850-26-5
- Potůček, M.: Analýza vývoje, neuralgických bodů a rozvojových příležitostí české sociální politiky po roce 1989. Studie. Praha, Nadání Josefa Hlávky 1998, 226 s.
- Potůček, M.: Křižovatky české sociální reformy. Praha, Sociologické nakladatelství 1999. 320 s. ISBN 80-85850-70-2
- Potůček, M.: Not Only the Market. Budapest, CEU Press 1999. 146 p. ISBN 963-9116-51-3
- Potůček, M. a kol: Vize rozvoje České republiky do roku 2015. (Vision of the development of the Czech Republic till 2015.) Praha, Gutenberg 2001. 245 s. ISBN 80-86349-02-0
- Potůček, M. a kol: Průvodce krajinou priorit pro Českou republiku. Praha, Gutenberg 2002.
- Potůček, M. a kol: Putování českou budoucností. Praha, Gutenberg 2003.
- Potůček, M. a kol: Zpráva o lidském rozvoji. Česká republika 2003. Praha, MJF 2003. (In English: Human Development Report. Where do we come from, what are we, and where we are going? Prague, MJF 2003.)
- Potůček, M. et al.: Millennium Development Goals. Reducing Poverty and Social Exclusion. Czech Republic. Bratislava, UNDP and CESES 2004. Česky: Rozvojové cíle tisícíletí. Cesta ke snižování chudoby a sociálního vyloučení. Bratislava, UNDP a CESES 2004.
- Potůček, M. a kol.: Strategické vládnutí a Česká republika. Praha, Grada 2007.
- Potůček, M. et al. Strategic governance and the Czech Republic. 1. vyd. Praha : Karolinum Press, 2009. 196 s. ISBN 978-80-246-1681-0.

=== Textbooks ===
- Potůček, M.: Sociální politika. Praha, Sociologické nakladatelství 1995. 142 s.
- Potůček, M.: Trh, demokracie a sociální politika, Demokracie a ústavnost. Editor Kunc, J., Praha, Karolinum Press 1996, s. 207-219. (2. vydání, Praha, Karolinum 1999, s. 245-258.)
- Potůček, M. - LeLoup, L. - Jenei G. - Váradi L.: Public Policy in Central and Eastern Europe: Theories, Methods, Practices. Bratislava. NISPAcee 2003.
- Potůček, M. a kol.: Veřejná politika, Praha, Sociologické nakladatelství 2005. 396 s. Reedice 2010.

=== Edited books ===
- Potůček, M. - Radičová, I. (eds.): Sociální politika v Čechách a na Slovensku po roce 1989. Praha, Karolinum Press 1998. ISBN 80-7184-622-8.
- Potůček, M. (ed.): Česká společnost na konci tisíciletí I, II. Sborník z mezinárodní konference k 650. výročí založení Univerzity Karlovy. Praha, Karolinum 1999. ISBN 80-7184-825-5
- Potůček, M. (ed.) The Capacity to Govern in Central and Eastern Europe. Bratislava, NISPAcee 2004, ISBN 80-89013-17-1.
- Potůček, M. (ed.): Manuál prognostických metod. Praha, Sociologické nakladatelství 2005.
- Potůček, M. - Scheffler, R. (eds.) Mental health care reform in the Czech and Slovak Republics, 1989 to the present. 1. vyd. Prague: Karolinum Press, 2008. 258 s. ISBN 978-80-246-1466-3.
- Potůček, M. - Musil, J. - Mašková, M. (eds.) Strategické volby pro Českou republiku : teoretická východiska. 1. vyd. Praha : Sociologické nakladatelství, 2008. 375 s. ISBN 978-80-86429-86-1.
- Potůček, M.(ed.) Capacities of governance in the Czech Republic. 1. vyd. Praha : Matfyzpress, 2008. 198 s. ISBN 978-80-7378-038-8.
- Potůček, M. - Mašková, M. (eds.) Česká republika - trendy, ohrožení, příležitosti. 1. vyd. Praha: Karolinum Press, 2009. 364 s. ISBN 978-80-246-1655-1.
