= Martin C. Putna =

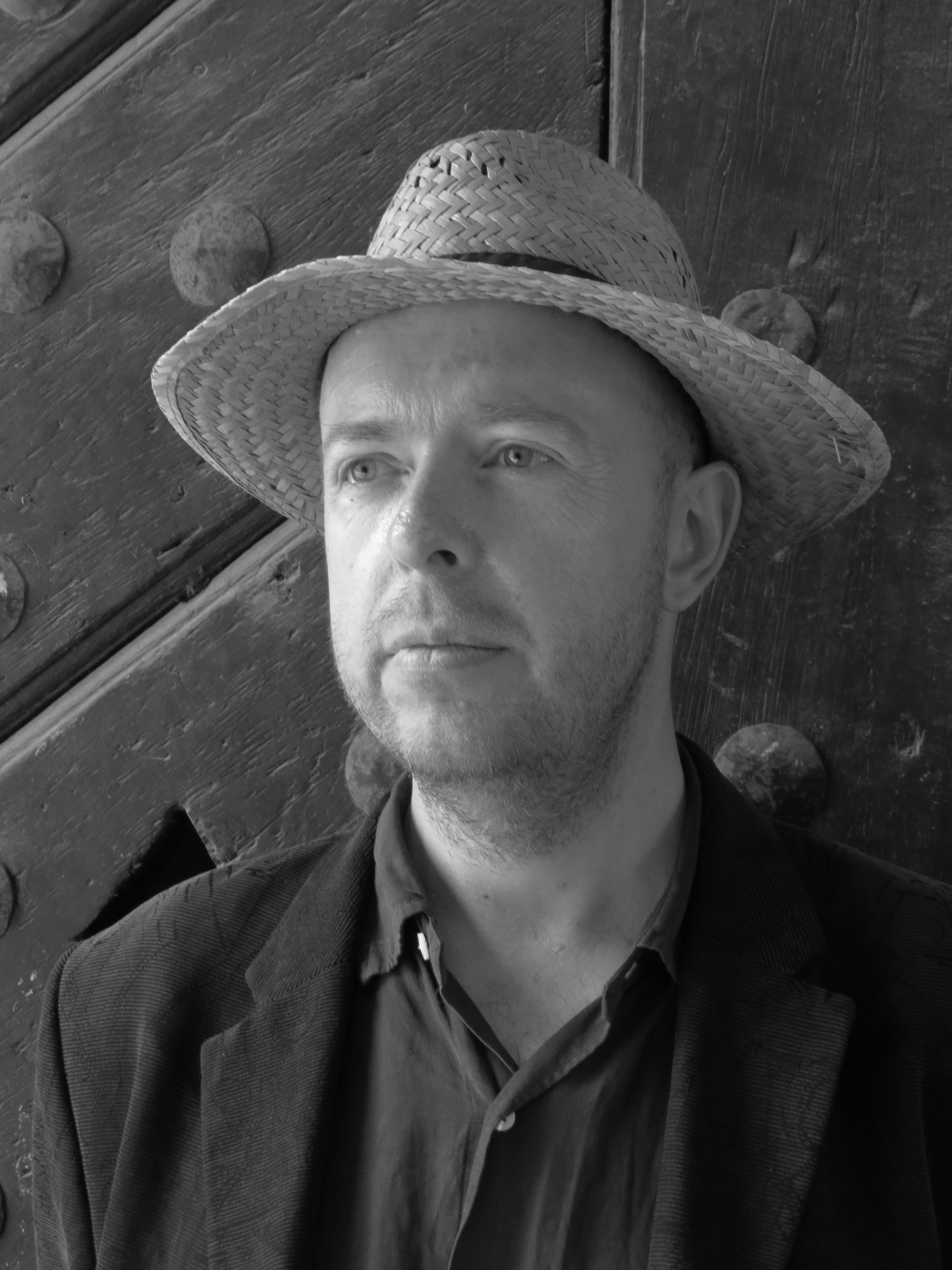
Martin C. Putna (Hana Rysová)

Martin C. Putna (born 30 May 1968 in Písek) is a Czech literary historian, university teacher, publicist and essayist. He works at the Faculty of Humanities, Charles University in Prague.

== Biography and career ==
Putna was born in Písek, Czech Republic. Between 1986 and 1991 he studied Philology at the Charles University in Prague. Since 1992 he has worked at the Charles University. He also studied Theology at the University of South Bohemia in České Budějovice. He was visiting scholar at the University of Regensburg.

He worked as a director of Vaclav Havel Presidential Library during the years 2009–2011. He is a regular contributor to the daily paper Lidové noviny, replacing Ludvík Vaculík as a core column author after Vaculík's death in 2015.

== Academic research ==
In his work, Putna focuses on Czech Catholic literature and Catholic influences on Czech culture. According to Putna's definition "Catholic Literature" (or "Catholic Culture") was being born during the 19th century (in different countries at different time periods) as a consequence of the process of secularisation, as "community-building literature". The Catholic literature served as the vehiculum of self-expression and self-identification of the "Catholic milieu". Putna's work brings first comprehensive historical description of the history of Czech Catholic Literature from 1848 till 1989.

In connection with the research Putna prepared several commented editions of previously unknown literary sources (most importantly: Karel VI. Schwarzenberg: Torzo díla. Vybral, sestavil a úvodní studií a poznámkami opatřil Martin C. Putna. Torst, Praha 2007, 1216 stran).

Since 2014, Putna is the editor-in chief of the first complete edition of collected works of Jakub Deml, one of the most complex Czech Catholic writers. Putna also researches other than Catholic streams of Czech spirituality. In the biography "Václav Havel. A Spiritual Portrait in the Contet of Twentieth-Century Czech Culture" (2011) he explored the influences of Václav Havel' family tradition (Masarykian civic and ethic religion, esoteric philosophy) and of post-modern Catholic philosophers (Zdeněk Neubauer and others) on Havel's thought.

In the book "Obrazy z kulturních dějin ruské religiozity" (Chapters from the Cultural History of Russian Religion, 2015) Putna used the methods of post-colonial history and histoire croisée. The result is a complex view of various national, cultural and religious traditions (many different "Russias"). Simultaneously, the book follows specifically Czech tradition (K. Havlíček Borovský, T. G. Masaryk, Václav Černý) of critical intellectual analysis of Russian culture in its ambivalence toward Europe. The Ukrainian culture is presented here as an "alternative", pro-European Eastern Slavic tradition.

Among his other academic interests are Late Ancient Culture, Ancient impact on European culture, Russian exile literature in the 20th century and the relationship between Christianity and homosexuality.

== Civic engagement ==
Putna is an outspoken civic opponent of pro-Russian, authoritarian and far-right streams in contemporary Czech society. During the presidential campaign of 2013, he strongly criticised Presidential Candidate Miloš Zeman for his pro-Putin leaning. Several months after that, Zeman as newly elected president refused to confirm Putna's nomination for the title of Professor of social and cultural anthropology. Zeman publicly claimed that the reason for this denial is Putna's involvement in Prague Gay Pride in 2011. After numerous protests from academic and broader circles, Zeman capitulated. Putna was appointed in June 2013.

Since 2015, Putna has repeatedly engaged in public actions in support of Ukraine, against Russian political influence in Czech Republic and against xenophobia.

== Selected works ==
- Česká katolická literatura v evropském kontextu 1848-1918. Vyd. 1. Praha: Torst, 1998. 801 s. ISBN 80-7215-059-6.
- Homosexualita v dějinách české kultury. Vyd. 1. Praha: Academia, 2011. 494 s., [24] s. obr. příl. Historie. ISBN 978-80-200-2000-0.
- Kniha Kraft: ein Bildungsroman. Vyd. 1. Praha: Torst, 1996. 227 s. ISBN 80-85639-73-4.
- Křesťanství a homosexualita: pokusy o integraci. Vyd. 1. Praha: Torst, 2012. 161 s. ISBN 978-80-7215-434-0.
- Rusko mimo Rusko: dějiny a kultura ruské emigrace 1917-1991. Vyd. 1. Brno: Petrov, 1994. 301 s. ISBN 80-85247-53-4.
- Václav Havel: duchovní portrét v rámu české kultury 20. století. 2. vyd. Praha: Knihovna Václava Havla, 2012. 383 s. Edice Knihovny Václava Havla; sv. 3. ISBN 978-80-87490-08-2.
- Rus - Ukraine – Russia. Scenes from the Cultural History of Russian Religiosity. Prague: Karolinum Press, 2021. ISBN 978-80-246-3580-4. Originally published in Czech as Obrazy z kulturních dějin ruské religiozity, Prague: Vyšehrad, 2015
