= Pavel Rychetský =

Czech lawyer (born 1943)

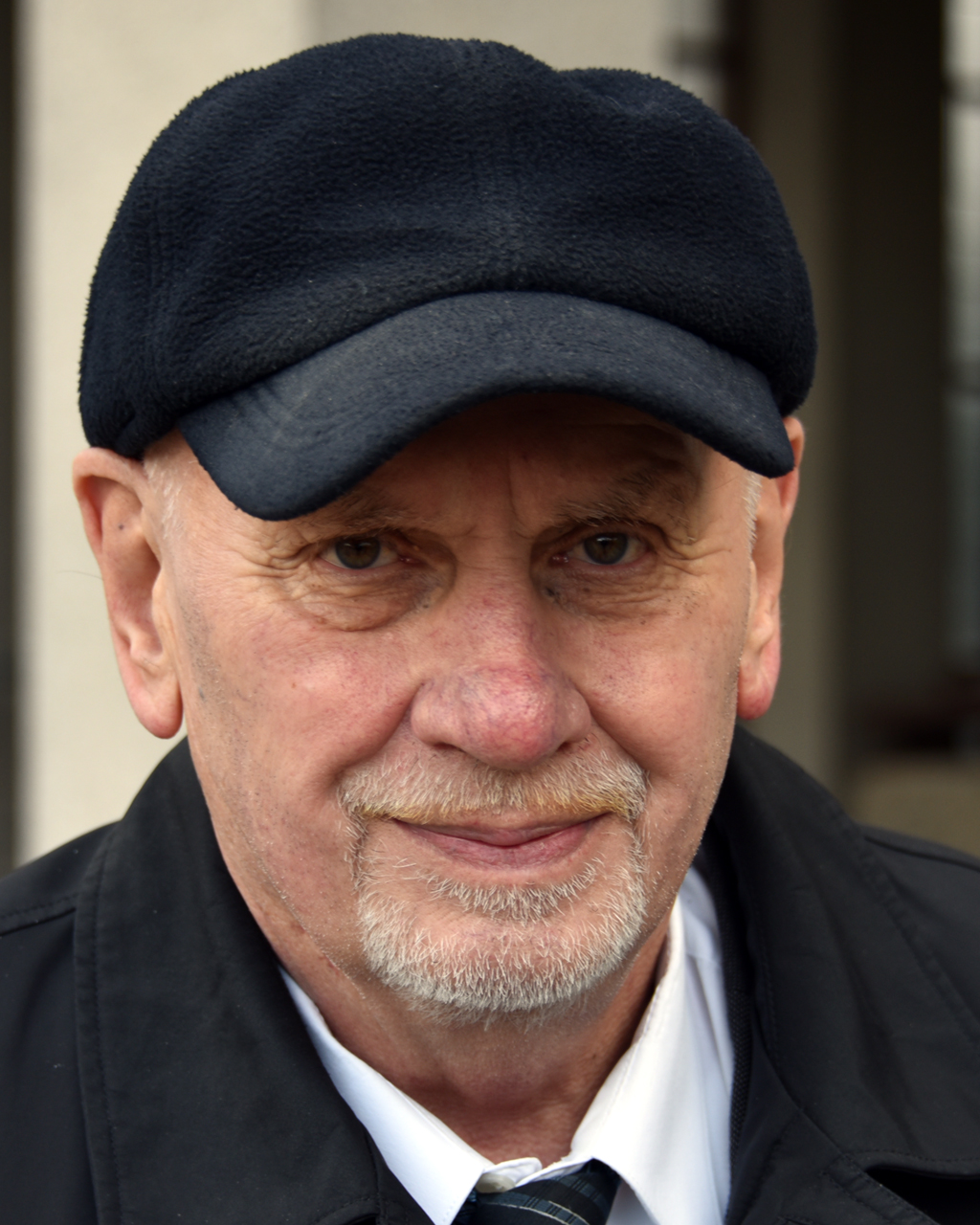

3rd President of the Constitutional Court
- In office 6 August 2003 – 7 August 2023
- Nominated by: Václav Klaus; Miloš Zeman
- Preceded by: Miloš Holeček
- Succeeded by: Josef Baxa

Minister of Justice
- In office 15 July 2002 – 5 August 2003
- Prime Minister: Vladimír Špidla
- Preceded by: Jaroslav Bureš
- Succeeded by: Karel Čermák
- In office 17 October 2000 – 1 February 2001
- Prime Minister: Miloš Zeman
- Preceded by: Otakar Motejl
- Succeeded by: Jaroslav Bureš

Deputy Prime Minister of the Czech Republic
- In office 22 July 1998 – 12 July 2002
- Prime Minister: Miloš Zeman

Chairman of the Government Legislative Council
- In office 22 July 1998 – 3 August 2003
- Prime Minister: Miloš Zeman; Vladimír Špidla
- Preceded by: Miloslav Výborný
- Succeeded by: Karel Čermák

Senator from Strakonice
- In office 23 November 1996 – 6 August 2003
- Preceded by: office established
- Succeeded by: Josef Kalbáč

Personal details
- Born: 17 August 1943 (age 83) Prague, Protectorate of Bohemia and Moravia (now Czech Republic)
- Party: Independent (2003–present)
- Other political affiliations: Communist Party (1966–1969); Civic Forum (1989–1991); Civic Movement (1991–1995); Social Democratic Party (1995–2003)
- Children: 3
- Education: Charles University

Pavel Rychetský (born 17 August 1943) is a Czech lawyer and former politician who was the 3rd President of the Constitutional Court of the Czech Republic. The Senate confirmed him on 16 July 2003 and on 6 August 2003, he was sworn in by President Václav Klaus and reappointed in 2013 by President Miloš Zeman.

Before joining the Constitutional Court, Rychetský was the Minister of Justice and Chairman of the Legislative Council from 15 July 2002 to 5 August 2003 and also Senator from Strakonice from 1996 to 2003. Between 1998 and 2002, he served as vice president of Miloš Zeman's government.

He previously had a private law practice and has held positions in the Government since early 1990s.

Rychetský was awarded the Légion d'honneur on 12 July 2005.
