= Karolinum Press =

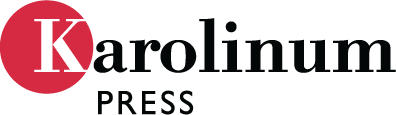
- Parent company: Charles University in Prague
- Founded: 1990
- Country of origin: Czech Republic
- Headquarters location: Prague
- Distribution: University of Chicago Press (English-language)
- Publication types: Books, Journals
- Official website: www.karolinum.cz

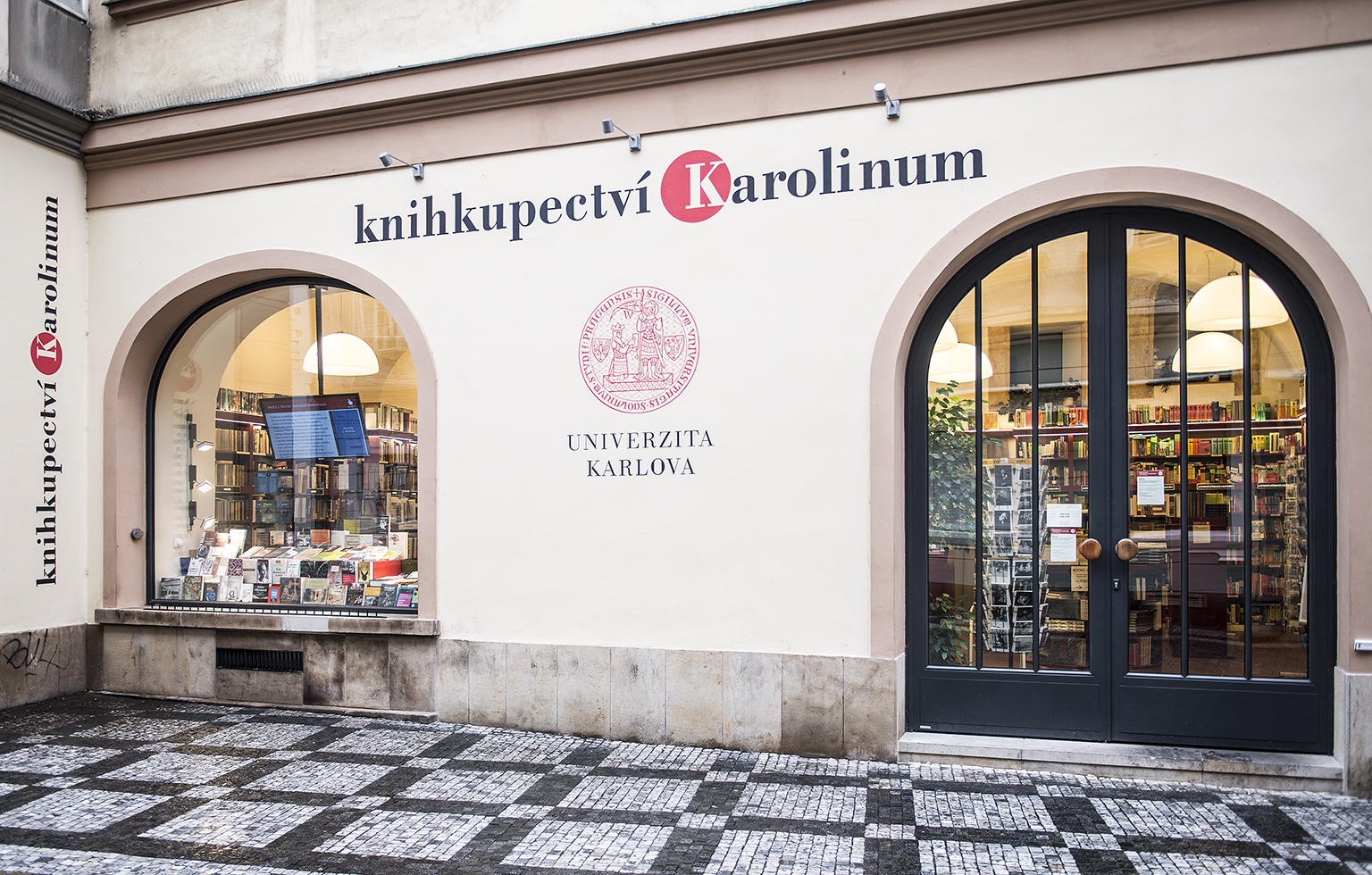
Karolinum bookstore in the centre of Prague

Karolinum Press is the university press of Charles University in Prague. It was established in 1990, and it has published over 5000 titles since then. Its English-language books are distributed globally by University of Chicago Press, and its e-books are available via ebrary.

== Sources ==
- Karolinum Press —website (English-language home page)
- Karolinum Press —description at Czech Literature Online
