= Miroslav Kříženecký =

Miroslav Kříženecký (born 1 June 1946) is a Czech lawyer, politician, 2003 presidential candidate and former military prosecutor.

== Biography ==
Born in Malšice, Kříženecký studied at Charles University in Prague where he received his law degree. He became Prosecutor in 1974. He became military prosecutor in 1990. He was involved in the case of Viktor Kožený.

He later became a civil attorney. He was involved in politics in the 1990s and was close to left-wing parties. He became a communist candidate in 2003 presidential election but wasn't elected.
