= Jaroslava Moserová =

Czech politician, diplomat and translator (1930–2006)

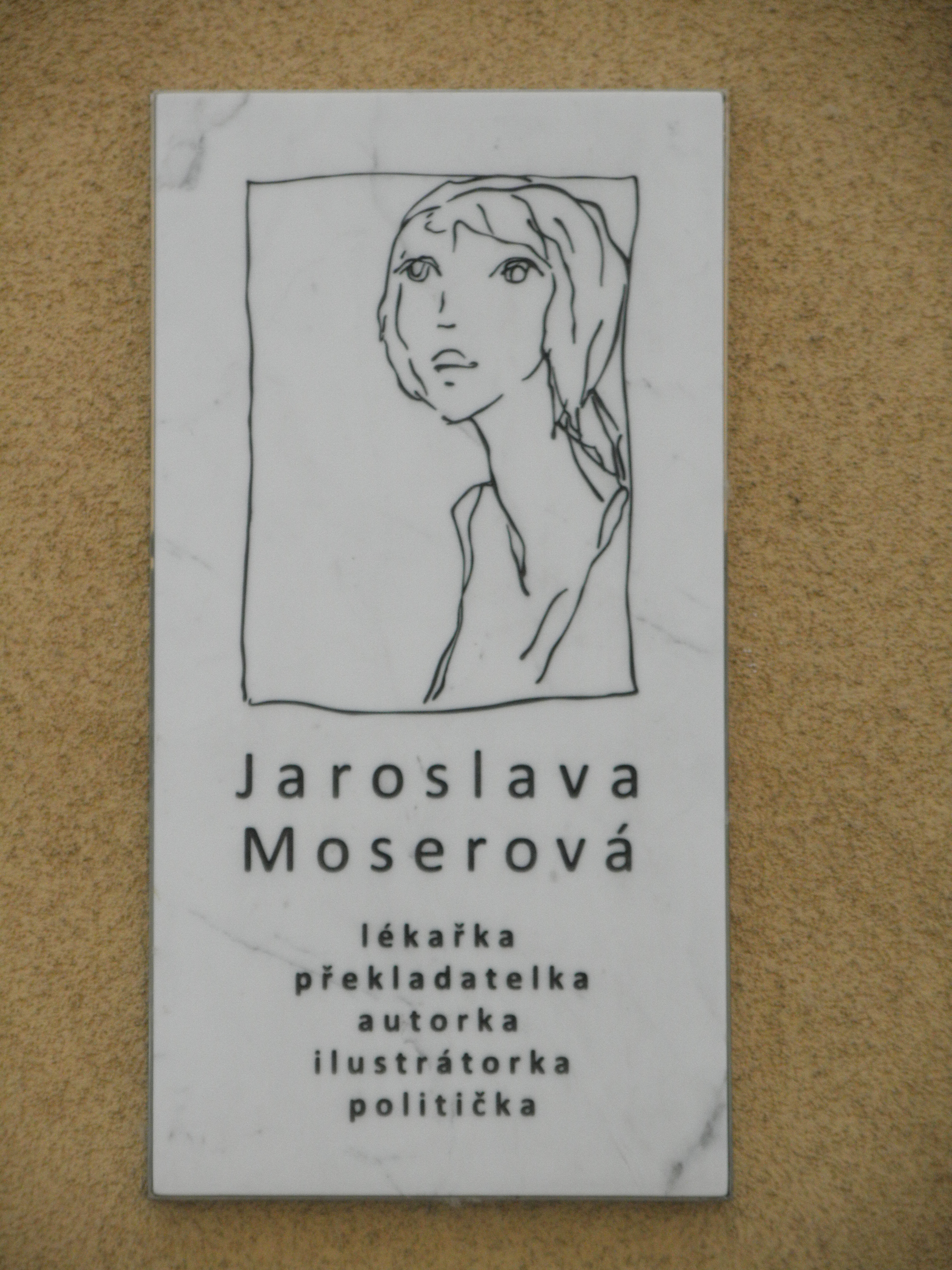
Moserová's plaque in Pardubice

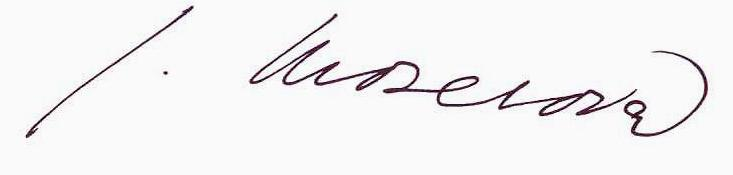
Moserová's signature

Jaroslava Moserová (17 January 1930 – 24 March 2006) was a Czech politician, diplomat, translator and screenwriter. She was originally a plastic surgeon with a specialisation in skin burns. She was an unsuccessful presidential candidate in the 2003 Czech presidential election.

== Biography ==
Moserová was born into a Czech-Jewish family in Prague. She was originally a physician with a specialisation in skin burns. She was the first doctor to attempt treatment for Jan Palach after his self-immolation on 16 January 1969. She wrote a number of stories, screenplays, dramas, and translated over forty books by Dick Francis into Czech. She entered politics in 1990 as chairwoman of the committee of science, education and culture. In 1991–1993, she was the ambassador of Czechoslovakia to Australia and New Zealand. From 1996–1999, she was vice-president of the Senate of the Czech Republic.

In 1999, she became president of the General Session of UNESCO. At the 2003 presidential election she unsuccessfully ran for president of the Czech Republic. French President Jacques Chirac honored her as an Officer of the Légion d'honneur. She died of cancer on 24 March 2006, in Prague at the age of 76.
