= Jaroslav Bureš =

Czech politician, lawyer and judge

Minister of Justice
- In office 2 February 2001 – 15 July 2002
- Prime Minister: Miloš Zeman
- Preceded by: Pavel Rychetský
- Succeeded by: Pavel Rychetský

Chairman of the Government Legislative Council
- In office 4 August 2004 – 25 April 2005
- Prime Minister: Stanislav Gross
- Preceded by: Karel Čermák
- Succeeded by: Pavel Zářecký

Personal details
- Born: 5 May 1954 (age 72) Mimoň, Czechoslovakia
- Party: KSČ (1986–1989)
- Education: Charles University
- Profession: Lawyer, judge

Jaroslav Bureš (born 5 May 1954) is a Czech lawyer, politician, former Minister of Justice and presidential candidate in 2003. He is a judge at a High court in Prague.

== Biography ==
Bureš was born in Mimoň. He graduated at Charles University in 1979 and received a law degree. He became a judge at Regional court in Prague and in 1991 he became part of Supreme Court of the Czech Republic.

He was a minister of Justice in 2001-2002. He participated in 2003 presidential election as nominee of Czech Social Democratic Party. He participated in party's primaries but came second. He was allowed to participate in the first ballot but was eliminated in the first round.
