= Jan Sokol (philosopher) =

Czech philosopher, dissident, politician and translator (1936–2021)

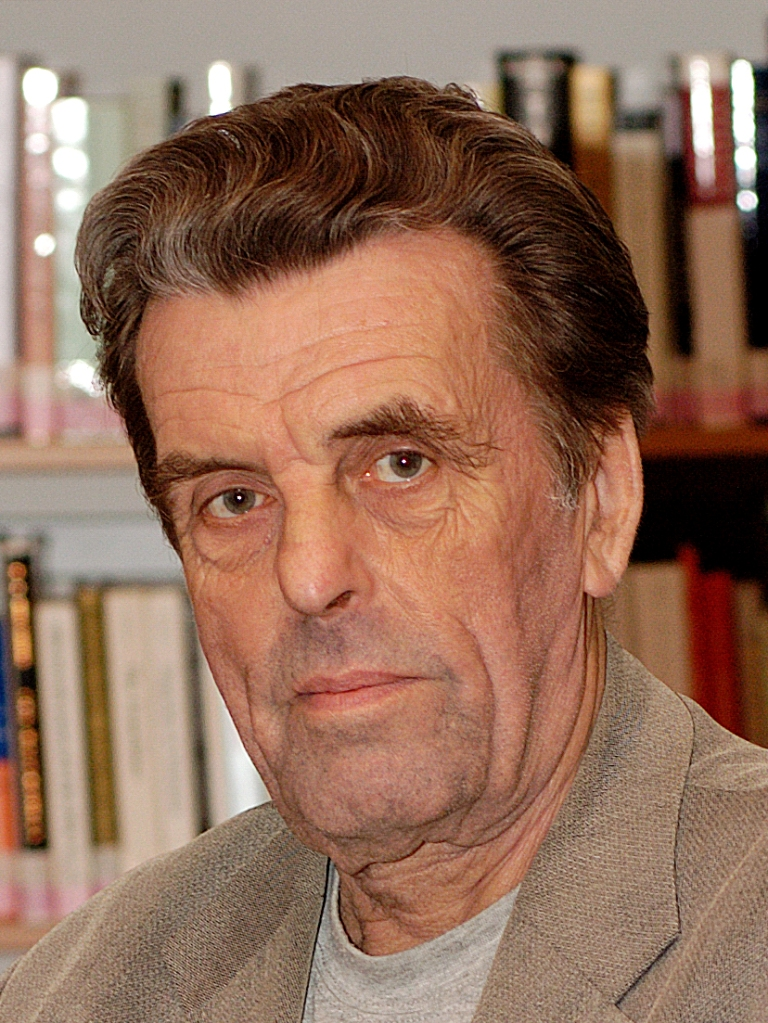
- Sokol in 2007

Minister of Education, Youth and Sports
- In office 2 January 1998 – 22 July 1998
- Prime Minister: Josef Tošovský
- Preceded by: Jiří Gruša
- Succeeded by: Eduard Zeman

Member of parliament for Prague
- In office 7 June 1990 – 4 June 1992

Personal details
- Born: 18 April 1936 Prague, Czechoslovakia
- Died: 16 February 2021 (aged 84) Prague, Czech Republic
- Spouse: Františka Sokolová
- Relatives: Jan Patočka (father-in-law)
- Education: Charles University

Jan Sokol (18 April 1936 – 16 February 2021) was a Czech philosopher, dissident, politician and translator. He briefly served as Minister of Education, Youth and Sports in 1998 under Prime Minister Josef Tošovský. From 1990 to 1992, he was Member of Parliament for Prague. From 2000 to 2007, he served as the first dean of the Faculty of Humanities at Charles University in Prague. Sokol ran for President of the Czech Republic in the 2003 election but lost to Václav Klaus.

== Life and work ==
He was born in Prague in a Catholic family, his father Jan was an architect, his grandfather František Nušl was an astronomer and mathematician. His younger brother Václav is a graphic artist.

During the Communist era, he was not allowed to study and, therefore, worked as a goldsmith, precision mechanic and software developer. Sokol studied mathematics in evening courses (received BA in 1967), translated numerous books on philosophy and religion to Czech (Lévinas, de Chardin, Gadamer, Foucault, Heidegger, Landsberg etc.), participated on the Czech Ecumenical Bible translation (1963–1979), and was one of the first signatories of the Charta 77 manifesto for Human rights.

In 1990, he was elected as a Member of the Czechoslovak Parliament, becoming vice-chairman of the Chamber of Nations and spokesman of the strongest faction Civic Forum (OF). In 1998 he was Minister of Education, Youth and Sports in caretaker Josef Tošovský's Cabinet.

In 1993, he obtained an MA in Anthropology, in 1995 a Ph.D. in Philosophy and since 2000 has been a full professor of philosophy. In 2000, Sokol became the first dean of Faculty of Humanities, Charles University in Prague, vice-dean in 2007 and in 2008 was appointed an Officer of the Légion d'honneur. In the Fall Semester 2008, he was a Senior Fellow at CSWR, Harvard University, lecturing on Religion, Ethics and Human rights.

He has been influenced mostly by Bible, Christian tradition, Friedrich Nietzsche, Martin Heidegger, Pierre Teilhard de Chardin, Raymond Ruyer, his father-in-law Jan Patočka and Emmanuel Lévinas. His works mainly dealt with Philosophical Anthropology, Phenomenology, Anthropology of Religion and of Law and in the theory of Human Rights. He has published several books, articles in Czech and in other languages and has delivered many guest lectures in various European countries and in the US, mostly on philosophy, religion, ethics and on European questions.

In a 2020 interview, Sokol stated that he frequently edited Wikipedia in order to reach young people. He was a prolific contributor to Wikipedia and honorary member of Wikimedia Czech Republic.

== Some publications ==
=== Books ===
In Czech:

- Cílek – Sokol – Sůvová, Evropa – náš domov (Europe – Our Home). Albatros, Praha 2018, 132 p. ISBN 978-80-00-05206-9
- Sokol, J., Naděje na neděli (Hope for Sunday). Praha 2017. 280 p. ISBN 978-80-7429-818-9
- Sokol, J., Dluh života. Články – eseje – glosy (The Debt of Life). FHS UK, Praha 2016. 668 p. ISBN 978-80-87398-86-9
- Sokol, J., Člověk jako osoba (Man as a Person). Vyšehrad, Praha 2016. 3rd. ed. 280 p. ISBN 978-80-7429-682-6
- Sokol, J.: Moc, peníze a právo (Power, Money and Law). Vyšehrad, Praha 2015. 2nd. ed. 304 p. ISBN 978-80-7429-638-3
- Sokol, J.: Etika, život, instituce (Ethics, Life and Institutions). Vyšehrad, Praha 2014, 264 p. ISBN 978-80-7429-223-1
- Sokol, J.: Malá filosofie člověka (A Small Philosophy of Man). Vysehrad, Prague 2010, 6th. ed. ISBN 978-80-7429-056-5
- Sokol, J.: Čas a rytmus (Time and Rhythm). Oikumene, Prague 2004, 2nd. ed. ISBN 80-7298-123-4
- Sokol, J.: Člověk a náboženství (Man and Religion). Portal, Prague 2004. ISBN 80-7178-886-4
- Sokol, J. – Z. Pinc: Antropologie a etika (Anthropology and Ethics). Triton, Prague 2003. ISBN 80-7254-372-5
- Sokol, J.: Filosofická antropologie (Philosophic Anthropology – Man as a Person). Portal, Prague 2002. ISBN 80-7178-627-6
- Sokol, J.: Mistr Eckhart a středověká mystika (Master Eckhart and the Medieval Mysticism). Vysehrad, Prague 2008, 3rd. ed. ISBN 978-80-7021-880-8.

In English::

- Sokol, J.: Ethics, life and institutions. English by N. Cairns and M. Pauzerová. Praha: Karolinum 2016. 258 p. ISBN 978-80-246-3429-6
- Sokol, J.: Thinking about ordinary things. English by M. Pauzerova. Praha: Karolinum 2013. 236 p. ISBN 978-80-246-2229-3

In German::

- Sokol, J.: Mensch und Religion : Ursprünge – Wege – Orientierungen. Übers. J. Ostmeyer. Freiburg im Breisgau: Alber Verlag, 2007. 320 S. ISBN 978-3-495-48264-3.
- Sokol, J.: Philosophie als Verpflichtung. Manutius Heidelberg 2014, 208 S. ISBN 978-3-944512-02-0

In Chinese:

- Sokol, J.: Xiao zhexue: ruhe sikao putong de shiwu. (A small philosophy). Peking University Press 2018, 249 p. ISBN 978-7-301-29887-9

=== Others ===
In English:

- Europe speaks. Linguistic Diversity and Politics. In: Angelaki: Journal of Theoretical Humanities. Vol. 15/3, 2010, p. 185–193. ISSN 1469-2899 (electronic) 0969-725X (paper)
- Language and experience. In: Dynamic structure. Language as an open system. Prague : Litteraria pragensia, 2007. p. 27–35. ISBN 80-7308-139-3.
- What does freedom look like? In: Int. J. Prenatal and perinatal psychology and medicine, Stockholm. Vol. 17, 1/2 (2005), p. 181–187. ISSN 0943-5417
- The market as a place of rules. In: M. T. Vogt (hsg.), Kulturen in Begegnung. Wroclaw – Görlitz 2004. ISBN 83-7432-018-4. p. 239–243.
- The Two Faces of Time. In: European Review, Vol. 9, No. 1, p. 11–18 (2001). ISSN 1062-7987.
- An Address from Elsewhere (The Message of Lévinas). In: Philosophy Today, Chicago, 43/2 (1999), p. 143–150, ISSN 0031-8256.

In German:

- Nachbarschaft – Nähe und Abgrenzung aus anthropologischer Sicht. In: Theologie der Gegenwart, Erfurt, Vol. 50 (2007)/3, S. 162–171. ISSN 0342-1457
- Die dreifache Verantwortung der Universität. In R. Gepp et al. (Hsg.), Bildung zwischen Luxus und Notwendigkeit. Wien : LIT-Verlag Wien, 2006. P. 21–27. Schriftenreihe der WA. Bd. 1. ISBN 3-8258-9360-X.
- Eine Ethik für alle Menschen? In: Schmidinger – Hoff (hsg.), Ethik im Brennpunkt. Tyrolia, Innsbruck 2005, S. 181–200. ISBN 3-7022-2710-5.
- Was ist Geld? In: Zeitschrift für Wirtschafts- und Unternehmensethik 5/2 (2004), S. 176–185. ISSN 1439-880X
- Europa spricht. Sprachenvielfalt und Politik. In: Osteuropa 5-6/2004, Berlin, S. 276–283. ISSN 0030-6428.
- Was ist Geld? In: Zeitschrift für Wirtschafts- und Unternehmensethik 5/2 (2004), S. 176–185. ISSN 1439-880X
- Was ist Geld? In: M. T. Vogt (hsg.), Kulturen in Begegnung. Wroclaw – Görlitz 2004. ISBN 83-7432-018-4. S. 189–198.
- Der zweifache Schöpfungsbericht als hermeneutischer Schlüssel. In: Pokorný, P. (ed.): Philosophical Hermeneutics and Biblical Exegesis. Tübingen 2002, ISBN 3-16-147894-0., S. 238–244.
- Leben als Bewegung. Jan Patočka und die Philosophie der Erziehung. In: Jahrbuch fuer Bildungs- und Erziehungsphilosophie, 3 (2000), S. 223–229. Schneider Hohengehren, ISBN 3-89676-328-8.

In French:

- Jan Patocka et la Charte 77. La nouvelle alternative, Paris, 22, 1, p. 29–34, 5 s. ISSN 0029-4705. 2008.
- Les regles: conditions de la liberté concrete. In: Philosophie de l'action. Cluj 2005, ISBN 973-7913-43-4, p. 173–181.
- Novotný, K. – Sokol, J.: Jan Patočka, penseur d'une dissidence philosophique et politique. In: Delsol – Maslowski – Nowicki (eds.): Dissidences. PUF Paris 2005. ISBN 2-13-054334-0. p. 15–34.
- L'obligation et la vie. In: Pouvoir et vie. Actes UEE de Nice. Cluj : Idea Design & Print, Editura, 2004. p. 117–125. ISBN 973-7913-27-2.
- D'ou vient l'idée de l'obligation morale? In: Quelle conception de l'homme aujourd'hui? Zuerich 2003. ISBN 3-908544-50-5. p. 119–130.
- La pensée européenne de Jan Patočka. In: Delsol – Maslowski (ed.): Histoire des idées politiques de l'Europe centrale, p. 496–510. PUF Paris 1998. ISBN 2-13-049071-9

In other languages:

- Zijn mensenrechten natuurlijk? Filosofie ond Praktijk, Budel (NL) : Damon, 28/2007, 4, p. 43–53, ISSN 0167-2444. 2007.

== See also ==
- List of Wikipedia people
