= Pavel Klener =

Czech politician (1937–2024)

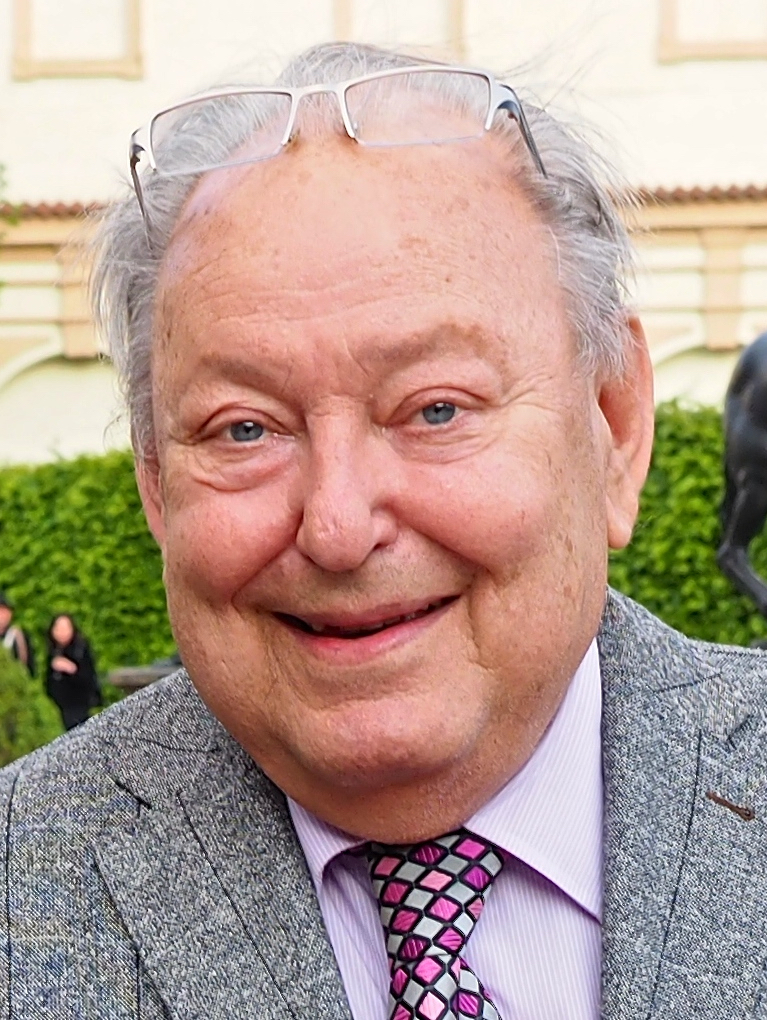
- Klener in 2016

Minister of Health and Social Affairs of the Czech Republic (within Czechoslovakia)
- In office 5 December 1989 – 29 June 1990
- Preceded by: Jaroslav Prokopec
- Succeeded by: Martin Bojar

Member of the Czech National Council
- In office 7 June 1990 – 4 June 1992

Personal details
- Born: 9 April 1937 Bratislava, Czechoslovakia
- Died: 20 September 2024 (aged 87)
- Party: OF; ODA
- Education: Charles University
- Occupation: Oncologist

Pavel Klener (9 April 1937 – 20 September 2024) was a Czech oncologist and politician. A member of the Civic Forum and later the Civic Democratic Alliance, he served as Minister of Health and Social Affairs from 1989 to 1990 and was a member of the Czech National Council from 1990 to 1992.

In 2003, he received the Medal of Merit (second grade).

Klener died on 20 September 2024, at the age of 87.
