= Otakar Motejl =

Czech lawyer and politician (1932–2010)

Minister of Justice
- In office 1 August 1998 – 16 October 2000
- Prime Minister: Miloš Zeman
- Preceded by: Vlasta Parkanová
- Succeeded by: Pavel Rychetský

Ombudsman of the Czech Republic
- In office 18 December 2000 – 9 May 2010
- Preceded by: office established
- Succeeded by: Pavel Varvařovský

1st Chairman of the Supreme Court
- In office 1993–1998
- Preceded by: office established
- Succeeded by: Eliška Wagnerová

Personal details
- Born: 10 September 1932 Prague, Czechoslovakia
- Died: 9 May 2010 (aged 77) Brno, Czech Republic
- Party: Independent (nominated by ČSSD)
- Education: Charles University
- Occupation: lawyer, judge

Otakar Motejl (10 September 1932; Prague – 9 May 2010; Brno) was a Czech lawyer and politician. He served as the first ombudsman of the Czech Republic from 2000 until his death in 2010. In 1998–2000 he served as the Minister of Justice.

== Life ==
Motejl graduated from the Law Faculty of the Charles University of Prague in 1955, and then worked as a lawyer in Banská Bystrica, Kladno, and Prague. Between 1966 and 1968, he worked at the Law Institute of the Ministry of Justice, then became a judge of the Supreme Court in 1968.

On 18 December 2000, he was selected as ombudsman. In 2006, Motejl was elected into the Chamber of Deputies of the Czech Republic for six years.

He participated in the 2003 Czech presidential election when he sought the Social Democratic nomination. According to poll by STEM, he was the front-runner in the primaries but was defeated by Miloš Zeman and Jaroslav Bureš and came third.

== Honours ==
- Order of Tomáš Garrigue Masaryk, II Class (2025)

Government offices
Preceded by Vlasta Parkanová	Minister of Justice of the Czech Republic; 1998–2000	Succeeded by Pavel Rychetský
