= Petra Buzková =

Czech lawyer and politician

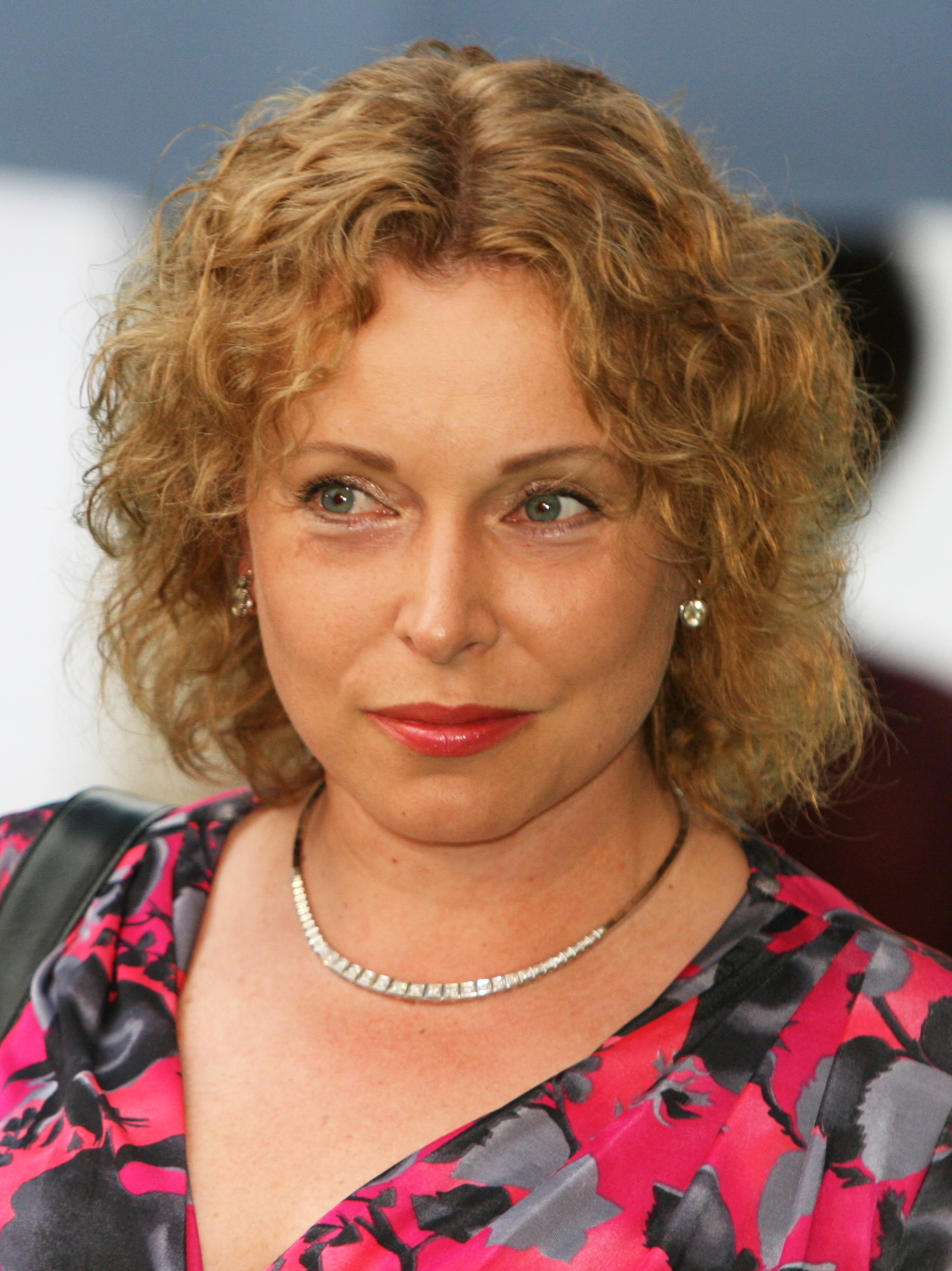
- Petra Buzková at 43rd KVIFF

Minister of Education, Youth and Sports
- In office 15 July 2002 – 4 September 2006
- Prime Minister: Vladimír Špidla; Stanislav Gross; Jiří Paroubek
- Preceded by: Eduard Zeman
- Succeeded by: Miroslava Kopicová

Personal details
- Born: 7 December 1965 (age 60) Prague, Czechoslovakia
- Party: Social Democracy (1989–2024)
- Spouse: Josef Kotrba
- Children: Anna Kotrbová
- Education: Charles University
- Profession: Lawyer

Petra Buzková (born 7 December 1965) is a Czech lawyer and politician. She was Minister of Education, Youth and Sports in the cabinet of Jiří Paroubek. She was a member of the Czech Social Democratic Party from 1989 to 2024. In 1992–2006, she was a member of the Chamber of Deputies.

Buzková obtained her Doctor of Laws degree from the Charles University in 1989. After her political career she continued her in steps of her education and became a lawyer in AKVKS.

== Personal life ==
Petra Buzková is living in Prague with her husband Josef Kotrba who is a financial advisor.
