= 1998 President of the Chamber of Deputies of the Parliament of the Czech Republic election =

President of the Chamber of Deputies of the Parliament of the Czech Republic, 1998
- 20 July 1998
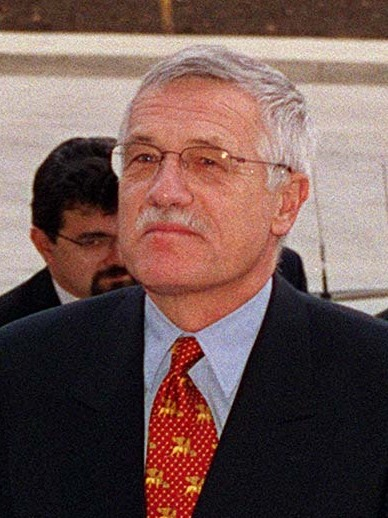

Candidate	Václav Klaus	Stanislav Volák
Party	ODS	US
Popular vote	137	39
Percentage	77.84%	22.16%
President before election
Miloš Zeman
ČSSD
Elected President
Václav Klaus
ODS

Election of the President of the Chamber of Deputies of the Parliament of the Czech Republic was held on 20 July 1998 after legislative election. Candidate of Civic Democratic Party Václav Klaus was elected the President. He was also supported by Czech Social Democratic Party as a result of Opposition Agreement.

== Background ==
Election was held after 1998 legislative election which was won by the Czech Social Democratic Party (ČSSD) while the Civic Democratic Party (ODS) came second. ODS eventually agreed to support a minority government by ČSSD while ČSSD agreed to the leader of ODS Václav Klaus for position of the President. Freedom Union decided to nominate Stanislav Volák for the position. Volák also had support of the Christian and Democratic Union – Czechoslovak People's Party.

== Voting and aftermath ==
Klaus received 137 votes while Volák only 39 votes. Klaus became the new President. The result was attacked by Freedom Union and by the People's Party. Members of these parties argued that the election is a confirmation of secret deals between ČSS and ODS. Jan Ruml stated that Klaus' victory marks the beginning of coalition between ODS and ČSSD. Leaders of Civic Democratic Alliance were also critical of the result. They doubted that Klaus would act independently as the President.

Klaus announced after the election that vote of confidence could be held on 18 August 1998.
