= 1997–1998 Czech political crisis =

Czech political crisis in 1997–1998 started as a result of irregularities in finances of Civic Democratic Party (ODS). It peaked with so-called Sarajevo atentate, an attempt to remove Václav Klaus from leadership of Civic Democratic Party. The attempt occurred during Klaus' visit in Sarajevo. Crisis led to split in ODS and snap election in 1998.

== History ==
Civic Democratic Party (ODS) led by Václav Klaus won 1996 legislative election but its coalition with Civic Democratic Alliance and Christian and Democratic Union – Czechoslovak People's Party was short of majority by one seat. Coalition then formed minority cabinet tolerated by Czech Social Democratic Party. Instability of government also worsened with economical problems of the country. Annual report of finances for 1995 showed that biggest sponsors of ODS are Lajos Bács a Radjiv M. Sinha. These names were revealed to be fictional and speculations that Milan Šrejber is the real sponsor behind these names showed up in media. Šrejber privatised Třinec Iron and Steel Works. These speculations were revealed to be true. Deputy CHairman of ODS Libor Novák accepted responsibility for the irregularities. Mladá Fronta Dnes informed on 28 November 1997 that ODS has a secret bank account in Switzerland. Josef Zieleniec then stepped down as Deputy Chairman of ODS and from position of Minister of Foreign affairs.

Civic Democratic Alliance and Christian and Democratic Union – Czechoslovak People's Party then left the government. Government ministers of ODS Jan Ruml and Ivan Pilip publicly appealed to Václav Klaus to step down as a leader of ODS. Klaus was at the time in Sarajevo. Klaus himself called their actions Sarajevo atentate which referred to the assassination of Archduke Franz Ferdinand of Austria. This helped Klaus to interpret the situation in his favor.

When Klaus returned from Sarajevo, he resigned as prime minister. This led to appointment of interim government. Klaus remained as leader of ODS. Civic Democrats held leadership election on 14 December 1997. Jan Ruml decided to run against Klaus. Klaus won by very large margin and remained leader of the Civic Democratic Party.

Ruml's and Pilip's wing then left the party and on 17 January 1998 formed Freedom Union (US). US quickly became second strongest party according to polls having more than 10%. Poll by STEM had Freedom Union on 18% while Civic Democrats would receive only 8%. Remains of ODS united behind Klaus who was during campaign for snap election in June presented as the only strong leader of Czech right. ODS then received 28% during the election which was above expectations. On the other hand, the US received 8.6% of votes. Czech Social Democratic Party won the election but was unable to form majority government. Klaus then signed Opposition Agreement with Social Democratic leader Miloš Zeman. Zeman became the new prime minister supported by Civic Democrats. Klaus became Speaker of Chamber of Deputies of the Czech Republic. Opposition Agreement allowed ODS to participate in management of the country.
