= 1998 Freedom Union leadership election =

- 17 January 1998
- Turnout: 95.8%
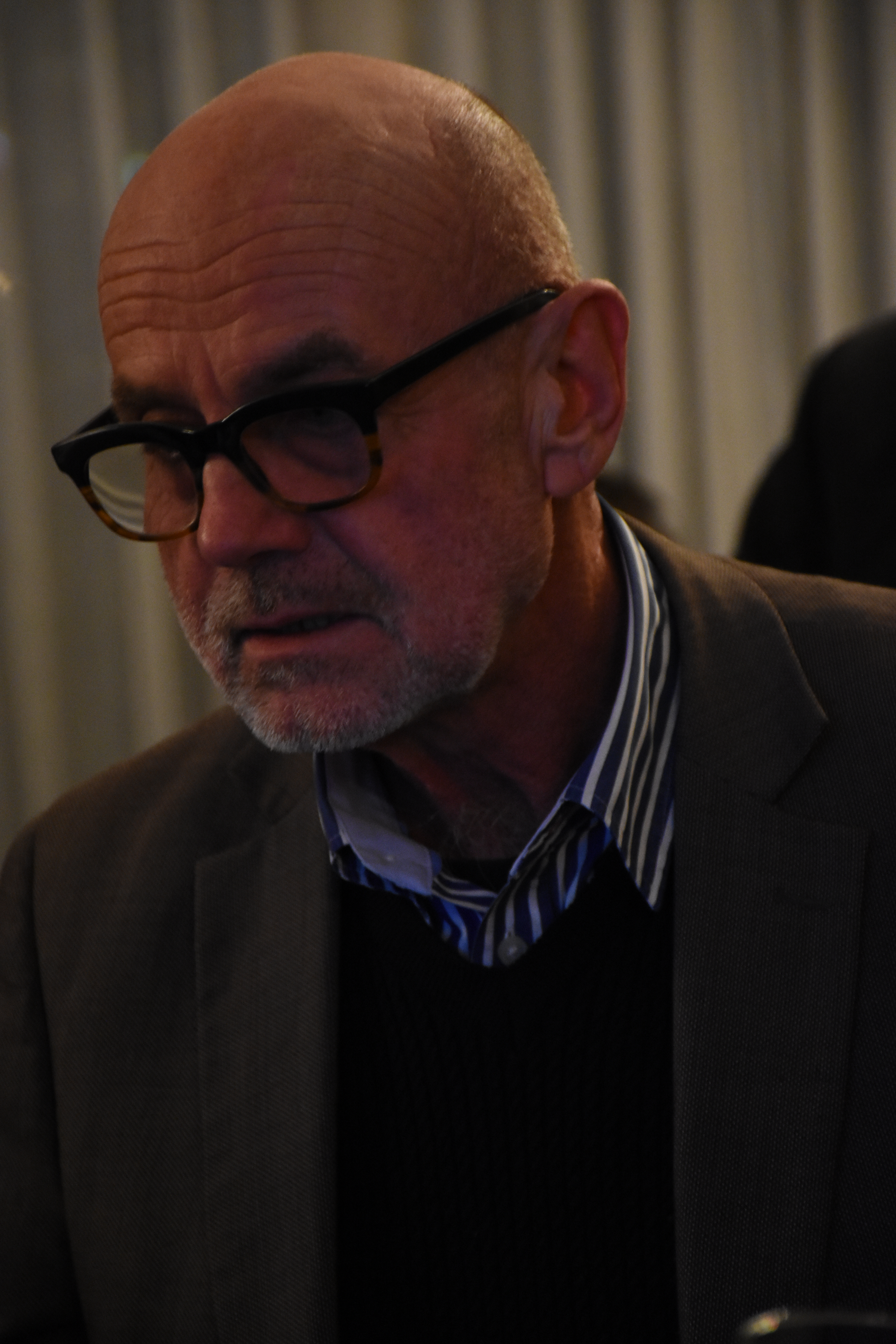

Candidate	Jan Ruml	Karel Cieslar	Ivo Šanc
Electoral vote	214	47	29
Percentage	74%	16%	10%
Elected Leader of US
Jan Ruml

A leadership election for the Freedom Union (US) was held in the Czech Republic on 17 January 1998. Jan Ruml was elected the first leader of the party when he defeated businessman Karel Cieslar and Mayor of Kutná Hora Ivo Šanc.

== Background ==
Freedom Union was founded in 1998 as a split from the Civic Democratic Party. It was a result of a political crisis that started during 1997.

== Voting ==
Candidate	Vote	%
Jan Ruml	214	73.79
Karel Cieslar	47	16.21
Ivo Šanc	29	10.00
Total	290	100

Ruml received 214 votes. His rivals Cieslar and Šanc received 47 and 29 votes respectively. 290 delegates voted.
