= 1997 Civic Democratic Party leadership election =

Czech political party election

- 14 December 1997
- Turnout: 95.8%
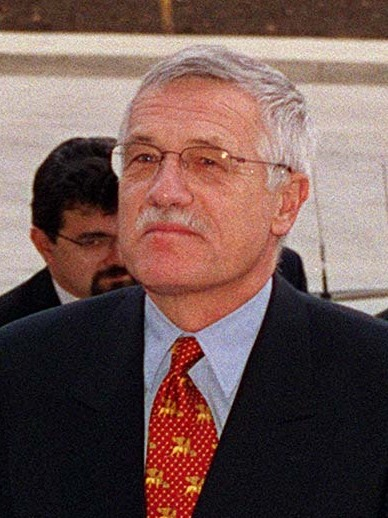

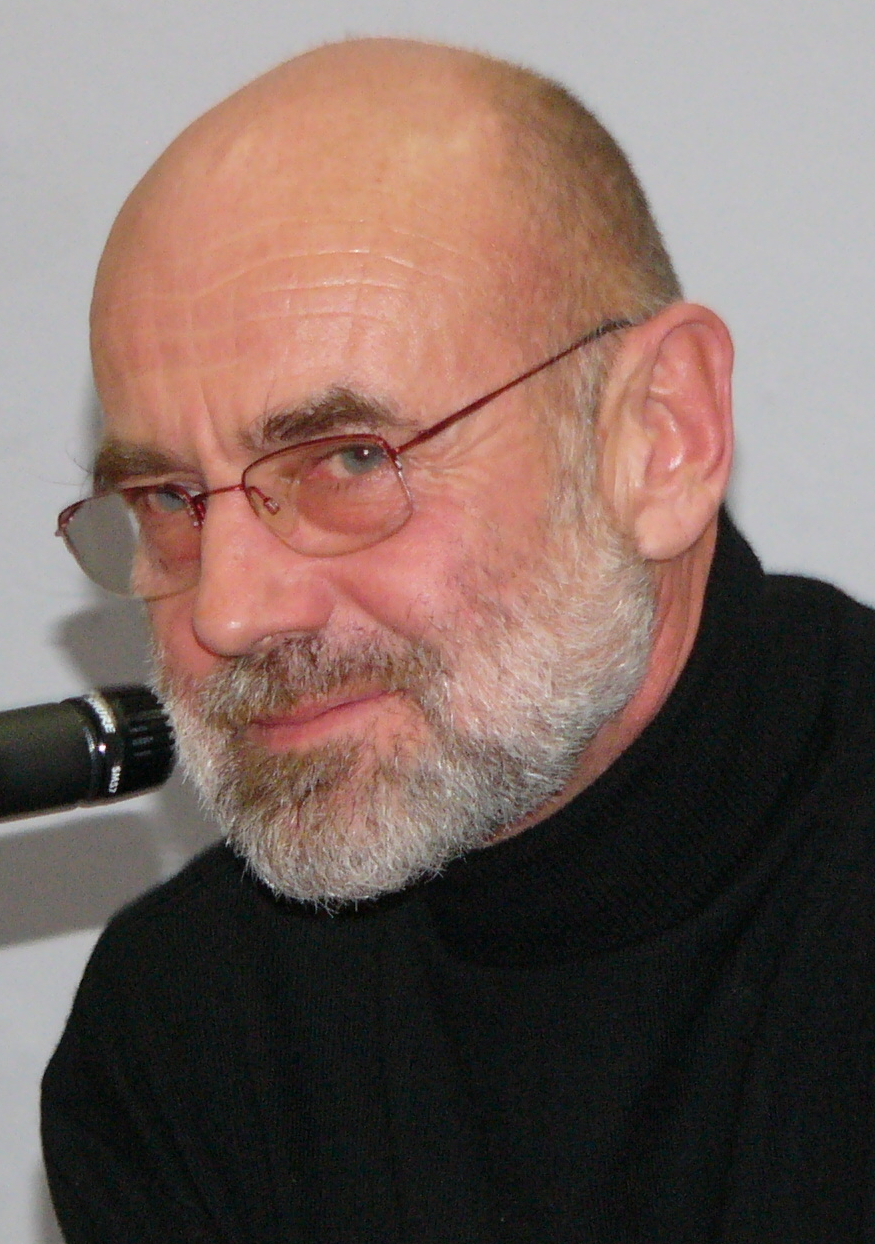
| Candidate | Václav Klaus | Jan Ruml |
| Electoral vote | 227 | 72 |
| Percentage | 75.9% | 24.1% |
Leader of ODS before election
Václav Klaus
Elected Leader of ODS
Václav Klaus

A leadership election for the Civic Democratic Party (ODS) was held in the Czech Republic on 14 December 1997. It followed a political crisis caused by allegations that the party had received illegal donations and was maintaining a secret slush which resulted in fall of the government. Incumbent party leader and Prime Minister Václav Klaus faced Jan Ruml, Klaus won the election and remained as the leader of the ODS, which led to a split in party when a group of ODS members left the party and founded the Freedom Union (US). In some subsequent opinion polls, the Freedom Union polled over 10% of the vote and was expected by some commentators to become the major centre-right party. However, the 1998 elections saw the party receive only 8.6% of vote, while the ODS remained the main right-wing party.

The elections were the first contested vote for ODS leader. A total of 312 delegates were allowed to vote, with future elections planned to be held every two years.

== Background ==
In 1996 and 1997, ODS faced scandals involving its finances. It led so-called Sarajevo assassination on 28 November 1997. Jan Ruml and Ivan Pilip called for resignation of incumbent leader and Prime minister of the Czech Republic Václav Klaus. It resulted in fall of government and political crisis.

Klaus resigned as a prime minister but remained leader of ODS. He announced on 3 December 1997 that he would run for reelection as the party's leader. He wrote an open letter for the party's members where he asked them for support and called party to become a constructive opposition. On the other hand Jan Ruml believed that ODS should remain in government. Ruml and his supporters created an ideological platform within ODS. Ruml himself announced that he will run against Klaus. Klaus quickly gathered support for his reelection.

== Results ==
| Candidate | Vote | % |
|---|---|---|
| Václav Klaus | 227 | 75.92 |
| Jan Ruml | 72 | 24.08 |
| Total | 299 | 100 |

According to preliminary reports, Klaus had stronger support. Jan Ruml stated that he won't leave ODS if he doesn't win and can express his opinions. Received two thirds of votes and defeated Ruml by large margin.
