= 2000 Freedom Union leadership election =

- 28 February 2000

Candidate	Karel Kühnl	Vladimír Mlynář
Electoral vote	193	87
Percentage	68.9%	31.1%
Leader of US before election
Karel Kühnl (acting)
Elected Leader of US
Karel Kühnl

A leadership election for the Freedom Union (US) was held in the Czech Republic on 28 February 2000. Karel Kühnl was elected the new leader of the Freedom Union.

== Background ==
The election was held following the resignation of the previous leader, Jan Ruml. Karel Kühnl then became the acting leader. The new election was scheduled for 28 February 2000. Kühnl ran for the leadership, and Vladimír Mlynář was his only rival. Kühnl was considered the front-runner.

== Voting ==
Candidate	Vote	%
Karel Kühnl	193	68.93
Vladimír Mlynář	87	31.07
Total	290	100
