= 1996 Civic Democratic Party leadership election =

Czech political party election

- 9 December 1996
- Turnout: 95.8%
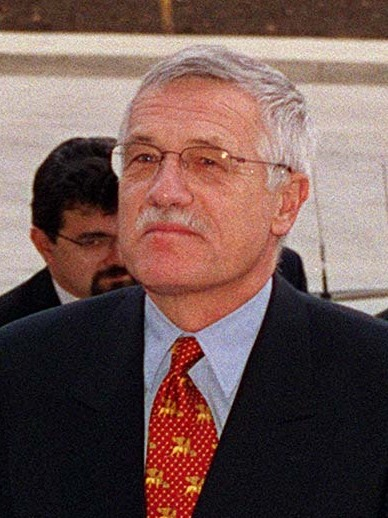
Candidate	Václav Klaus
Electoral vote	249
Percentage	81%
Leader of ODS before election
Václav Klaus
Elected Leader of ODS
Václav Klaus

A leadership election for the Civic Democratic Party (ODS) was held in the Czech Republic on 9 December 1996. Václav Klaus was reelected leader of ODS. Election was part of 7th Congress of the party. Klaus received 249 votes of 295. It was the last time when leader was elected for one-year term. Christian Democratic Party was merged with ODS at the congress. Delegates also voted in favour of change of political style.

Klaus' victory wasn't as decisive as in previous elections which was considered a sign of tension within the party. Some members of the party delivered critical speeches during the election. This includes Jan Ruml and Josef Zieleniec.
