= Liberalism in the Czech Republic =

This article gives an overview of liberalism in the Czech Republic. It is limited to liberal parties with substantial support, mainly proved by having had a representation in parliament. The sign ⇒ denotes another party in that scheme. For inclusion in this scheme it is not necessary that parties label themselves as a liberal party.

== Background ==
When liberalism started in the Czech lands, they were member states of Austria-Hungary. Liberals in the region started as part of the conservative nationalist National Party (Národní strana) or Old Czechs, but from 1874 they formed their own party: the National Liberal Party (Národní strana svobodomyslná), also known as the Young Czechs.

== History ==
=== Mayors and Independents ===
- 2004: Founded

=== Pirate Party ===
- 2009: Founded

=== TOP 09 ===
- 2009: Founded

=== National Liberal Party ===
- 1874: Liberals in Bohemia seceded from the National Party and formed the National Liberal Party.
- 1889: A faction of the National Party joined the National Liberal Party.
- 1897: The ⇒ Radical Progressive Party seceded from the party.
- 1899: The ⇒ Czech State Rights Radical Party seceded from the party.
- 1900: A faction seceded as the ⇒ Czech People's Party.
- 1918: The party merged with the ⇒ Czech State Rights Radical Party, the National Party and others into the mainly conservative Czech State Rights Democrats (Česká státoprávní demokracie), renamed in 1919 as the Czechoslovak National Democracy (Československá národní demokracie).
- 1924: Allies of president Tomáš Garrigue Masaryk left the party to form the ⇒ National Labour Party.
- 1934: After the party developed into a national-conservative party, it joined the National Unification (Národní sjedonocení).

=== Czech People's Party / Czech Progressive Party ===
- 1887: A second faction of liberals seceded from the National Party and joined the ⇒ National Liberal Party in 1889.
- 1900: This faction formed the Czech People's Party (Česká strana lidová).
- 1906: The party absorbed the ⇒ Radical Progressive Party and was renamed Czech Progressive Party (Česka strana pokroková).
- 1918: The party disappeared, members joined the ⇒ Czech State Rights Democrats and the ⇒ Czech Socialist Party

=== Radical Progressive Party ===
- 1897: The Radical Progressive Party (Strana radikálně pokroková) seceded from the ⇒ National Liberal Party
- 1906: The party merged into the ⇒ Czech Progressive Party

=== From National Social Party until Liberal National Social Party ===
- 1898: National-minded social democrats and left-wing liberals formed the Czech National Social Party (Česká strana národně sociální).
- 1918: The party was reorganized into the Czech Socialist Party (Česká socialistická strana), from 1919 the Czechoslovak Socialist Party (Československá socialistická strana).
- 1926: The party absorbed the liberal ⇒ National Labour Party and was renamed the Czechoslovak National Socialist Party (Československá národně socialistická strana).
- 1948: The party continued as a satellite party of the communists under the name Czechoslovak Socialist Party (Československá strana socialistická). It regained a democratic profile in 1990, after the fall of the Communist regime.
- 1993: The party was renamed the Liberal National Social Party (Liberální strana národně sociální), but didn't play a role anymore.
- 1995: The party merged with the ⇒ Free Democrats into the ⇒ Free Democrats-Liberal National Social Party. Shortly before the merger a conservative faction seceded as the Civic National Movement (Občanské národní hnutí)
- 1997: After failure in 1996 elections, the Free Democrats left the party and it was renamed again into Czech National Social Party.

=== Radical State Rights Party / Progressive State Rights Party ===
- 1899: The Radical State Rights Party (Strana radikálně státoprávní) seceded from the ⇒ National Liberal Party
- 1908: The party merged with a faction of the former ⇒ Radical Progressive Party into the Progressive State Rights Party (Strana státoprávně pokroková).
- 1918: The party merged with the ⇒ National Liberal Party and others into the ⇒ Czech State Rights Democrats.

=== National Labour Party ===
- 1924: A liberal faction of the ⇒ Czechoslovak National Democrats left the party to form the National Labour Party (Národní strana práce).
- 1926: The party merged into the ⇒ Czechoslovak National Socialist Party

=== German Democratic Freedom Party ===
- 1919: German liberals in Czechoslovakia formed the German Democratic Freedom Party (Deutschdemokratische Freiheitspartei)
- 1938: The party disappeared with the German takeover of Czechoslovakia.

=== From Civic Movement until Party for the Open Society ===
- 1991: Liberals inside the general democratic Civic Forum (Občanské fórum) formed the Civic Movement (Občanské hnutí). The movement largely failed in elections.
- 1993: The party was renamed into the Free Democrats (Svobodní demokraté).
- 1995: After another failure in elections the party merged with the ⇒ Liberal National Social Party into the Free Democrats-Liberal National Social Party (Svobodní Demokraté - Liberální strana národně sociální).
- 1997: After failure in 1996 elections, the Free Democrats left the party and in 1998 formed the Party for the Open Society (Strana pro otevřenou společnost).

=== Civic Democratic Alliance ===
- 1991: At the fracturing of the general democratic Civic Forum (Občanské fórum) the conservative and liberal right wing faction Civic Democratic Alliance (Občanská demokratická alliance) established itself as a separate party.
- After being quite influential during the early 1990s (over 5% of voters, participated in government) the party gradually declined. It no longer plays any role in Czech politics.
- Some regional factions formed new liberal parties in the second half of the 1990s:
  - Liberal Reform Party (Liberální reformní strana) in South Moravian Region (in Brno),
  - Vote for the City (Volba pro město) in Hradec Králové Region,
  - Some members in Liberec Region left party and entered the ⇒ Party for Open Society.

=== Freedom Union ===
- 1998: A breakaway group of the Civic Democratic Party established the liberal Freedom Union (Unie Svobody).
- 2001: The party merged with the Democratic Union (Demokratická unie) into the Freedom Union – Democratic Union (Unie Svobody - Demokratická unie, US-DEU)
- The influence and membership of the party declined and in the 2006 parliamentary elections it obtained only 0.3% of the vote.

== Liberal leaders ==
- National Liberal Party: Tomáš Garrigue Masaryk (1850–1937), but he strictly rejected the label "liberal"
- No party: Václav Havel
- No party: Petr Pavel
- National Social Party: Edvard Beneš
- Free Democrats: Jiří Dienstbier (party is defunct)
- Freedom Union: Jan Ruml, Hana Marvanová (no longer a member)

== Liberal thinkers ==
In the contributions to liberal theory the following Czech thinkers are included:

- Karel Havlíček Borovský (1821–1856), a Czech liberal journalist
- Tomáš Garrigue Masaryk (1850–1937), but he strictly rejected being counted as a liberal
- Karel Čapek (1890–1938), a Czech writer
- Josef Kaizl (1854–1901)

== See also ==
- History of the Czech Republic
- Politics of the Czech Republic
- List of political parties in the Czech Republic
