= Freedom Union =

Freedom Union can refer to:

- Freedom Union – Democratic Union, Czech republic
- Freedom Union (Faroe Islands) (Frælsisfylkingin)
- Freedom Union (Poland)
