= Opinion polling for the 2002 Czech parliamentary election =

Opinion polling for the 2002 Czech parliamentary election started immediately after the 1998 parliamentary election.

== Opinion polls ==
Date	Polling Firm	ČSSD	ODS	4K	KSČM	Others
14-15 Jun 2002	Election	30.2	24.5	14.3	18.5	12.5
5 - 12 Jun 2002	CVVM	29.0	27.0	13.5	17.5	13.0
6 Jun 2002	TNS Factum	29.4	27.8	13.1	18.4	11.3
20–27 May 2002	CVVM	21.5	19.5	11.5	10.0	37.5
22 - 29 Apr 2002	CVVM	24.0	22.0	12.5	14.5	27.0
17 Apr 2002	TNS Factum	24.1	28.2	19.6	17.5	10.6
4 Apr 2002	STEM	23.7	26.4	17.0	14.1	18.8
22 Mar - 2 Apr 2002	CVVM	22.0	20.0	17.0	14.0	27.0
8 Mar 2002	TNS Factum	25.0	30.5	17.0	16.2	11.3
4 Mar 2002	STEM	26.4	23.7	16.9	14.1	18.9
15 Feb 2002	CVVM	23.0	18.5	23.0	13.5	22.0
15 Feb 2002	STEM	23.8	23.0	19.1	13.4	20.7
24 Jan 2002	STEM	21.5	21.3	22.5	15.6	19.1
7 Jan 2002	CVVM	24.0	18.0	20.0	10.0	28.0
17 Dec 2001	STEM	20.6	20.8	29.1	14.8	14.7
20 Nov 2001	STEM	20.5	22.9	23.7	14.2	18.7
20 Oct 2001	STEM	22.9	20.5	23.7	15.0	17.9
20 Sept 2001	STEM	19.4	22.4	23.6	13.9	20.7
20 Jun 2001	STEM	19.2	22.4	23.5	15.1	19.9
20 May 2001	STEM	20.7	22.0	25.7	16.7	14.6
20 Apr 2001	STEM	20.4	20.8	25.5	14.1	19.2
20 Mar 2001	STEM	16.3	19.7	29.8	17.1	17.1
20 Feb 2001	STEM	17.7	18.0	29.7	16.2	18.4
20 Jan 2001	STEM	17.6	16.0	15.7	15.7	19.8
9 Jan 2000	Sofres-Factum	11.2	20.1	21.3	15.9	
19 - 20 Jun 1998	Previous Election	32.3	27.7	19.0	11.0	10.0
