= Democratic Union (Czech Republic) =

Democratic Union Demokratická unie
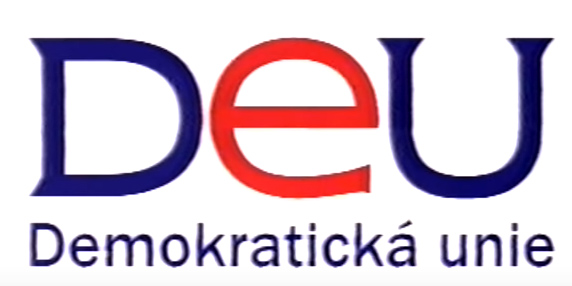
- Founded: 1994
- Dissolved: 2002
- Merged into: Freedom Union – Democratic Union
- Ideology: Liberalism
- Political position: Centre-right
- Colours: Dark red

Democratic Union (abbreviated DEU) was a liberal political party in the Czech Republic. It existed since 1994 and was dissolved in 2002 when it merged with Freedom Union.

== History ==
The party first participated in 1996 parliamentary election but failed to reach 5% threshold. The party later joined Four-Coalition.

DEU merged with Freedom Union in 2000, and Freedom Union changed its name to Freedom Union – Democratic Union. Members of DEU founded a relatively independent platform, whose members later tried, unsuccessfully, to take over the leadership. Platform then left the party and established Democratic Union of the Czech Republic (DEU ČR).

== Election results ==
=== Chamber of deputies of the Czech Republic ===
Year	Vote	Vote %	Seats	Place	Government
1996	169,796	2.80	0 / 200	8th	No
1998	86,431	1.44	0 / 200	8th	No
