= Hana Marvanová =

Czech lawyer and politician

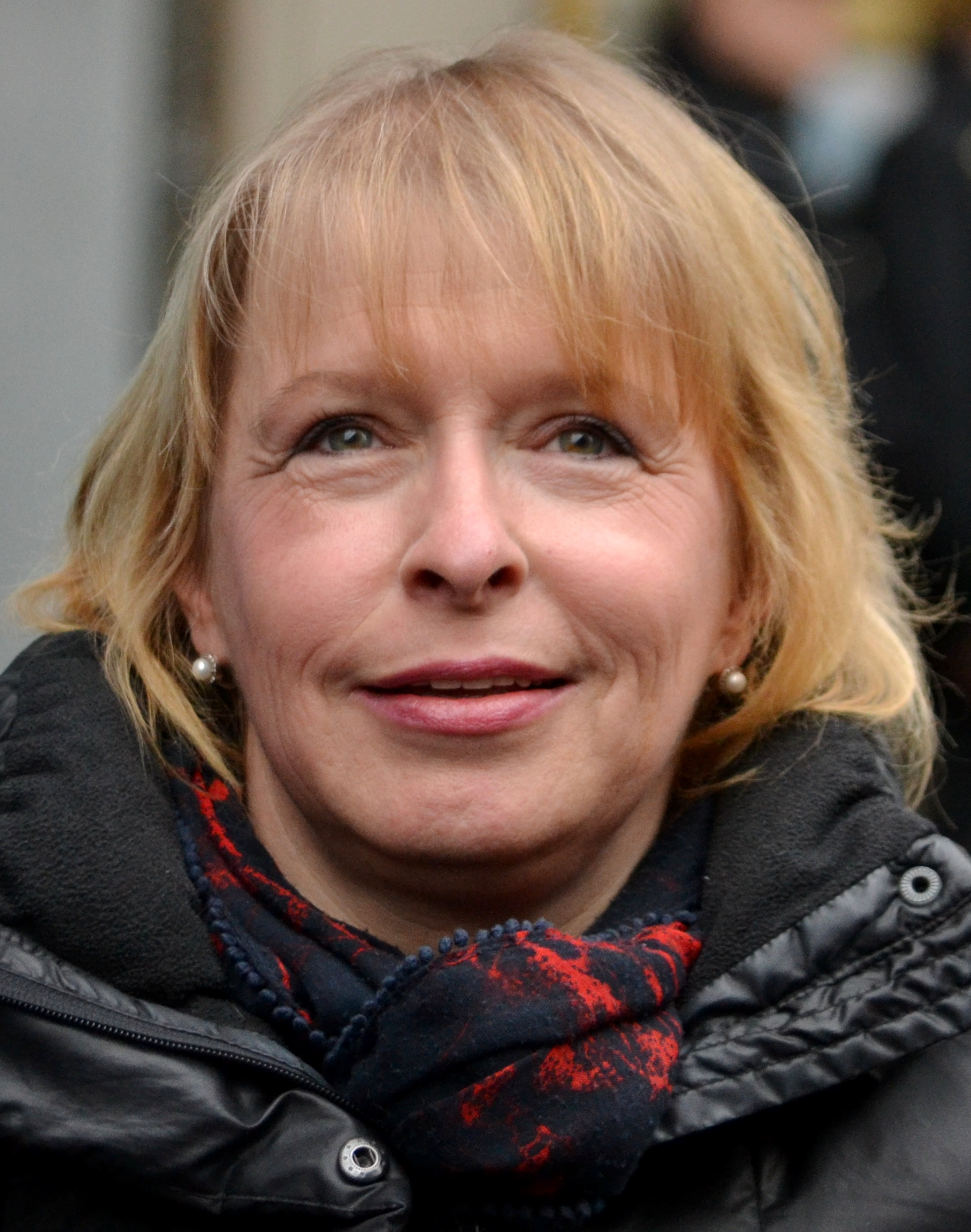
- Hana Kordová Marvanová (2016)
- Born: Hana Marvanová; 26 November 1962; Rýmařov
- Alma mater: Faculty of Law
- Occupation: Jurist
- Political party: Civic Forum, Civic Democratic Party, Freedom Union – Democratic Union, Mayors and Independents
- Spouse(s): Roman Korda
- Awards: participant in the resistance and resistance against communism
- Website: www.hanamarvanova.cz
- Position held: deputy chairperson (1998–1998), Member of the Chamber of Deputies of the Parliament of the Czech Republic (1990–1992), Member of the Chamber of Deputies of the Parliament of the Czech Republic (1993–1998), Member of the Chamber of Deputies of the Parliament of the Czech Republic (2002–2003)

Hana Kordová Marvanová (born 26 November 1962) is a Czech lawyer and politician, and a former vice-chair of the Chamber of Deputies of the Czech Republic.

== Political career ==
Prior to 1989, during the communist regime, she was a dissident, and for several months prior to the Velvet Revolution she was a political prisoner.

From 1990 to 1998 and again from 2002 to 2003 she was a member of the Chamber of Deputies, representing initially the Civic Forum, later the Civic Democratic Party (ODS) and the Freedom Union (US-DEU). From 2001 to 2002 she was the chair of the US-DEU, and in 2002 briefly a deputy chair of the Chamber of Deputies.

In 2014 she briefly served as the deputy to the Minister of Justice, Helena Válková.

In 2018 she was elected to Prague City Council as a non-party member of the Mayors and Independents (STAN), and a councillor and a commissioner for legislation, public administration and housing support.

She is the founder of several activist organizations and initiatives, including the Independent Peace Association and the Public Against Corruption initiative.
