= Opposition agreement =

Political agreement between two major parties in the Czech Republic

The Opposition Agreement (Czech: Opoziční smlouva) was a political agreement between two major parties in the Czech Republic, the Czech Social Democratic Party (ČSSD) and the Civic Democratic Party (ODS). ČSSD was allowed to govern alone while ODS received a number of parliamentary posts and the two parties together adopted several constitutional amendments. It was signed by Miloš Zeman and Václav Klaus on 8 July 1998.

The agreement was signed as a result of problematic coalition talks after the 1998 legislative election. It was criticised by many journalists and politicians who blamed it for a rise in corruption. Many commentators also considered it to be a de facto coalition agreement. On the other hand, supporters say that it helped to stabilise the political situation in the country.

== Background ==
Václav Klaus's second government collapsed due to an internal crisis within ODS, the largest coalition party, related to unclear financing of the party, and the subsequent withdrawal of the Civic Democratic Alliance (ODA) and KDU-ČSL from the coalition. A snap election was scheduled on 19 and 20 June 1998. Some members of ODS left the party and formed the Freedom Union, while the rest remained loyal to Klaus. The event was named the "Sarajevo assassination" by supporters of Klaus, as Klaus was in Sarajevo at the time of the attempted takeover.

The 1998 legislative election ended with a narrow victory for ČSSD. The coalition negotiations were unsuccessful, as the Freedom Union refused to enter a coalition with ČSSD, while ODS refused to enter a coalition with the Freedom Union, due to their "betrayal".

Instead, the leaders of ODS and ČSSD (Klaus and Miloš Zeman) decided to make a deal.

== The Agreement ==
The "Treaty on creating a stable political environment in Czech Republic" (Czech: Smlouva o vytvoření stabilního politického prostředí v České republice), more commonly known as "the opposition agreement" (Czech: Opoziční smlouva) established a set of rules for the winning party and the second party.

Both parties pledged to:

- Respect the winning party's right to form a government and formalize a process for realization of this respect (by leaving the Chamber of deputies during confidence votes, allowing the governing party to win confidence votes without actually having majority).
- Respect the right of a defeated party to be in opposition to the government.
- Respect the opposition party's right to hold the chair of both houses of parliament.
- Respect the opposition party's right to control the leading control bodies, specified in the treaty.
- Not to propose a motion of no confidence and not supporting such a motion in the event another party proposes it.
- Propose changes to strengthen the importance of results of competition of political parties for the Constitution and related laws.
- Consult the solution for foreign and domestic affairs before the readings in the parliament. With preferential consideration of stability, prosperity and position of the Czech Republic in the world.
- To take no part in deals with third parties, which would lead to weakening the position of the opposition agreement.

== Attempt to change the electoral system ==
The two parties also reached an agreement on changing the electoral system to benefit parties with the most votes — themselves at the time — by making constituencies smaller and changing the allocation formula. The new law would have almost destroyed the opposition and given the two parties nearly all the seats in the Chamber of Deputies, but it was struck down by the constitutional court, as Article 18 of the Czech Constitution explicitly states that elections to the Chamber of Deputies must be held "according to the principle of proportional representation".
