= Civic Democratic Alliance =

Civic Democratic Alliance Občanská demokratická aliance
- Founded: 5 March 1990
- Dissolved: 31 December 2007
- Preceded by: Civic Forum
- Headquarters: U Společenské zahrady 6 140 00 Prague 4
- Newspaper: Zpravodaj
- Youth wing: Conservative Club of Young
- Membership (2007): 300
- Ideology: Conservative liberalism
- Political position: Centre-right
- European affiliation: European Liberal Democrat and Reform Party
- Colours: Blue

The Civic Democratic Alliance (Czech: Občanská demokratická aliance, ODA) was a conservative-liberal political party in the Czech Republic, active between 1989 and 2007. ODA was part of government coalitions until 1997 and participated in the transformation of the Czech economy. The party was supported by president Václav Havel, who voted for it in the 1992 and 1996 elections.

== History ==
ODA was established as a conservative-liberal party in 1989, shortly after the Velvet revolution. In the 1992 legislative election, ODA received over 300,000 votes (5.93%) and won 14 seats in the Czech National Council. It became part of the first right-wing coalition led by Václav Klaus, together with the Civic Democratic Party (ODS), Christian and Democratic Union (KDU–ČSL) and Christian Democratic Party (KDS).

In the 1996 legislative election, ODA received 6.36% of the vote, and formed another coalition with ODS and KDU–ČSL. However, this government did not have a majority in the Chamber of Deputies, and was therefore reliant on the support of the centre-left Social Democrats (ČSSD). Following financial scandals within ODS, the coalition fell apart, and both ODS and KDU-ČSL participated in the caretaker government of Josef Tošovský.

ODA did not participate in the 1998 legislative election, in order to avoid splitting the right-wing vote. ODA formed the Four-Coalition with KDU–ČSL, Freedom Union and Democratic Union, in opposition to the grand coalition of ODS and ČSSD. However, ODA became the coalition's weakest member, and partly as a result of financial difficulties, began to fade out of the Czech political scene, with only one senator remaining, Karel Schwarzenberg. The party ceased activity on 31 December 2007.

Czech billionaire Pavel Sehnal announced in December 2016 that he had established a new Civic Democratic Alliance, without the involvement of the original ODA leadership.

== Election results ==
=== Chamber of Deputies ===
Year	Vote	Vote %	Seats	Place	Govt?
1990	...	...	11 / 200	6th	Yes
1992	383,705	5.93%	14 / 200	7th	Yes
1996	385,369	6.36%	13 / 200	6th	Yes
1998	did not contest	...	...	...	No
2002	24,278	0.5%	0 / 200	13th	No

Seats in the Chamber of Deputies

=== Senate ===
Year	Seats
1996	7 / 81
1998	4 / 27
2000	1 / 27
2002	0 / 27
2004	1 / 27
2006	0 / 27

Seats in the Senate

=== Presidential ===
Indirect Election	Candidate	First round result			Second round result			Third round result		
Indirect Election	Candidate	Votes	%Votes	Result	Votes	%Votes	Result	Votes	%Votes	Result
1993	Václav Havel	109	63.37	Won	—					
1998	Václav Havel	130	70.65	Runner-up	146	52.3	Won	—		

=== European Parliament ===
Year	Vote	Vote %	Seats
2004	39 655	1.69%	0

== Leaders ==
- Pavel Bratinka (1989–1992)
- Jan Kalvoda (1992–1997)
- Michael Žantovský (1997)
- Jiří Skalický (1997–1998)
- Daniel Kroupa (1998–2001)
- Michael Žantovský (2001–2002)
- Jiřina Nováková (2002–2007)

== See also ==
- Liberalism
- Liberalism worldwide
- List of liberal parties
- Liberalism in the Czech lands
