= 1996 Czech parliamentary election =

- 31 May and 1 June 1996

All 200 seats in the Chamber of Deputies 101 seats needed for a majority
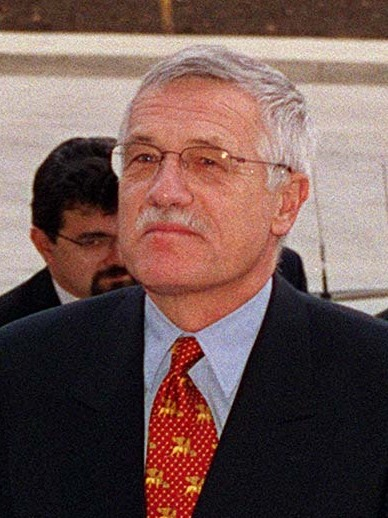

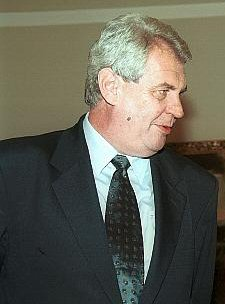

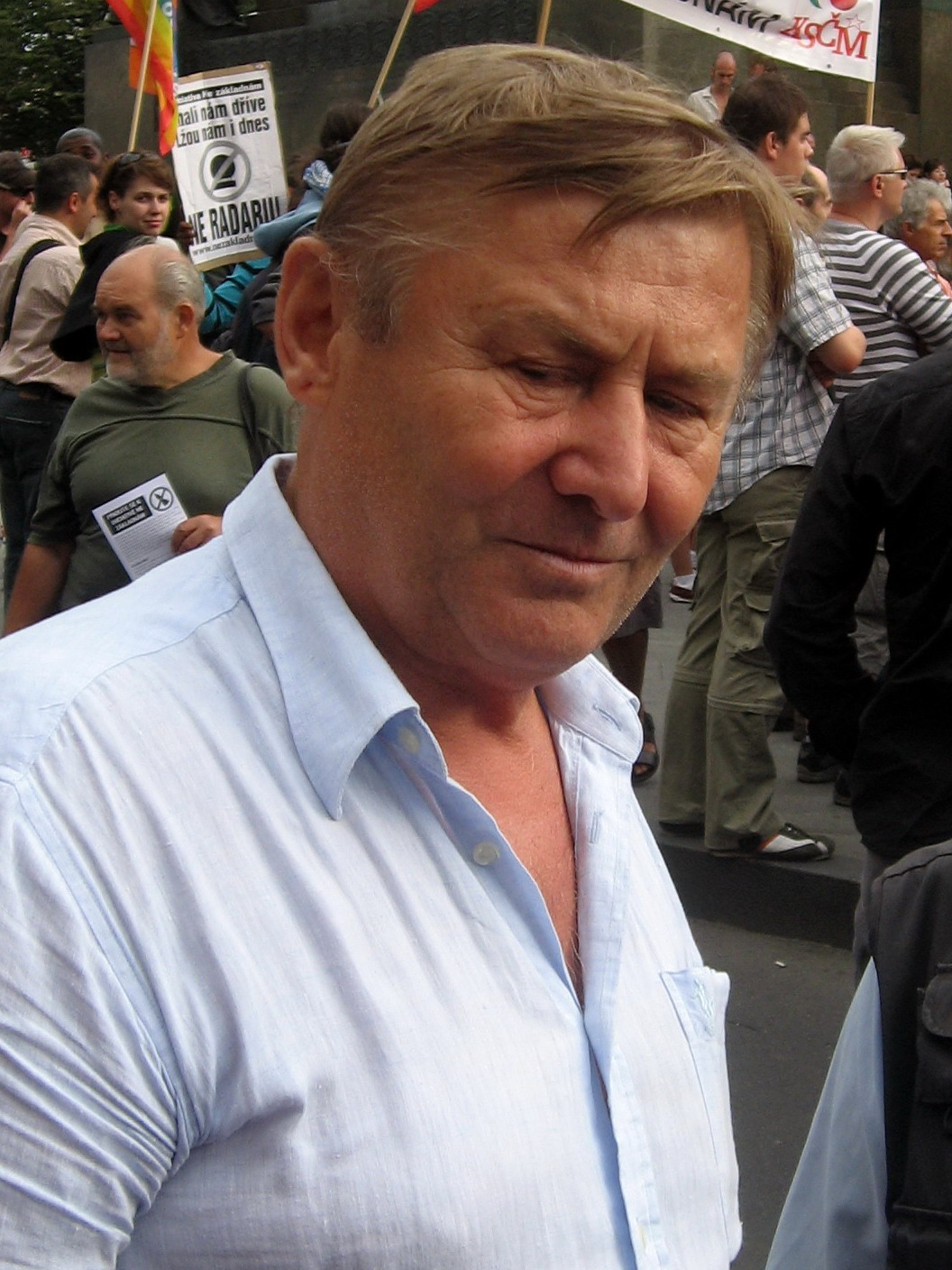

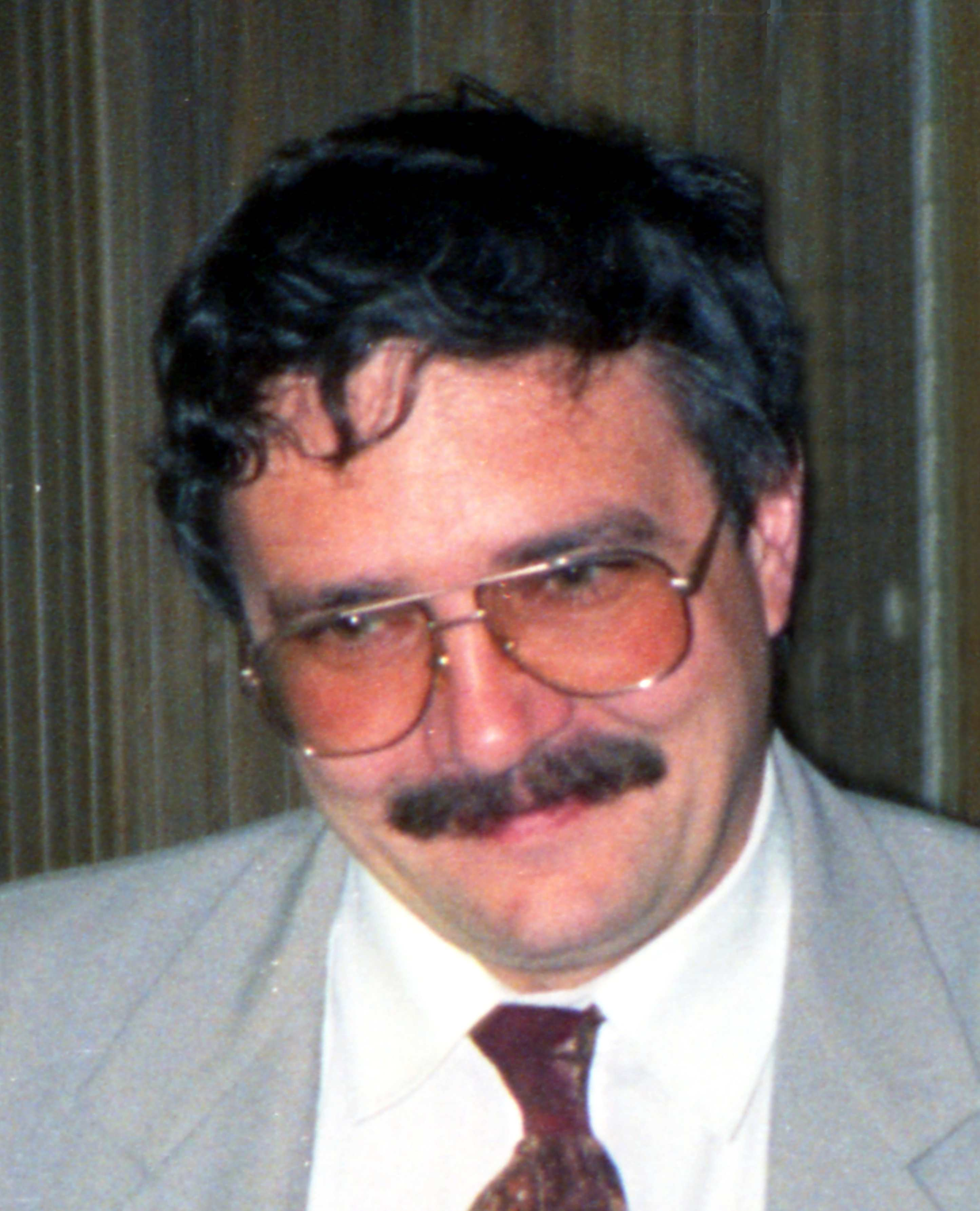

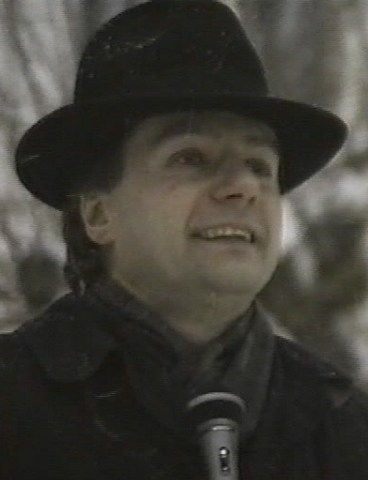

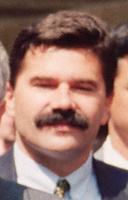
	First party	Second party	Third party
Leader	Václav Klaus	Miloš Zeman	Miroslav Grebeníček
Party	ODS	ČSSD	KSČM
Seats won	68	61	22
Seat change	▼8	▲45	▼13
Popular vote	1,794,560	1,602,250	626,136
Percentage	29.62%	26.44%	10.33%
Swing	▼0.11pp	▲19.91pp	▼3.72pp
	Fourth party	Fifth party	Sixth party
Leader	Josef Lux	Miroslav Sládek	Jan Kalvoda
Party	KDU-ČSL	SPR–RSČ	ODA
Seats won	18	18	13
Seat change	▲3	▲4	▼1
Popular vote	489,349	485,072	385,369
Percentage	8.08%	8.01	6.36
Swing	▲1.80pp	▲2.03pp	▲0.43pp
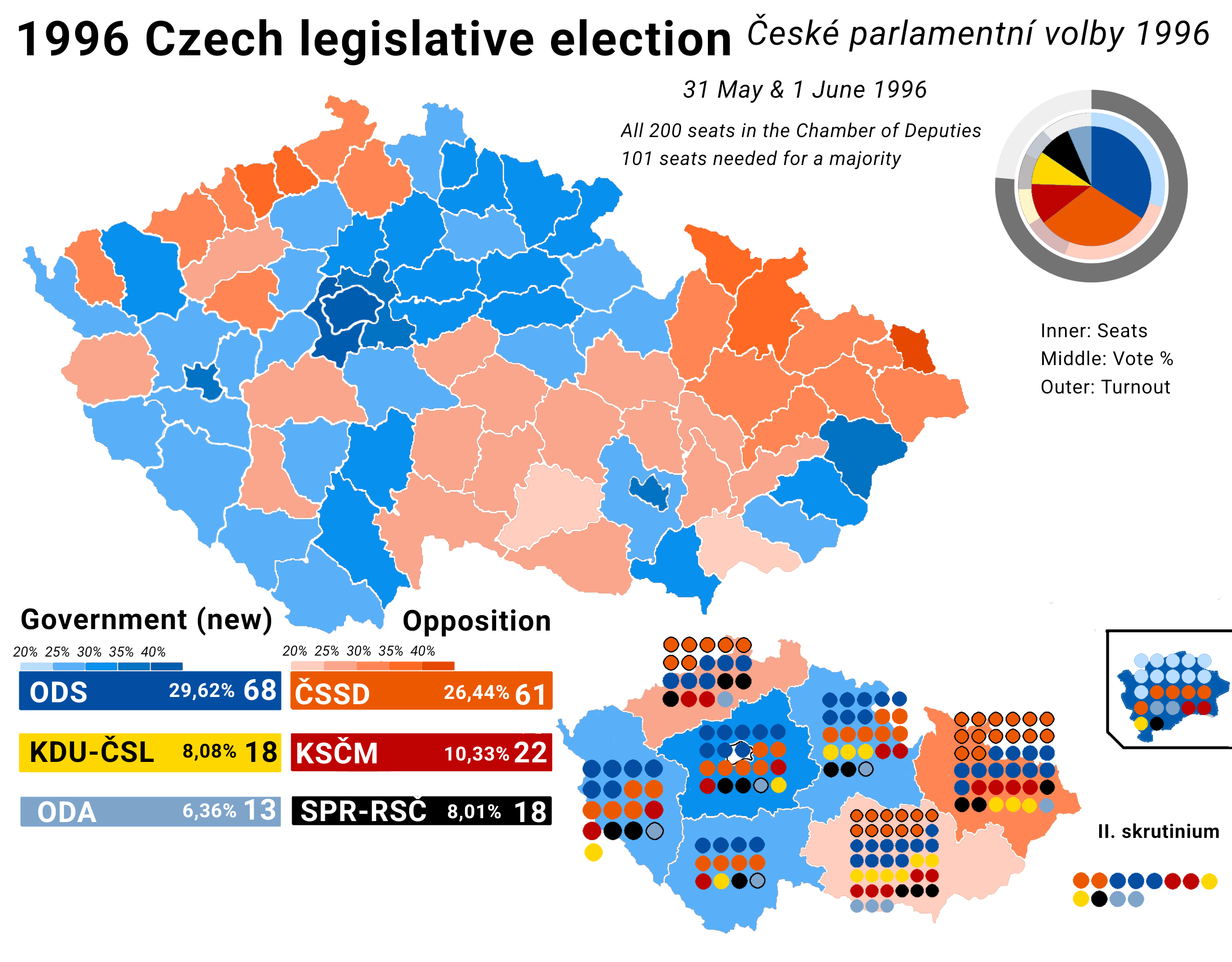
- Results by constituency
Prime Minister before election
Václav Klaus
ODS
Prime Minister after election
Václav Klaus
ODS

Parliamentary elections were held in the Czech Republic on 31 May and 1 June 1996, the first after independence. The Civic Democratic Party remained the largest party in the Chamber of Deputies, winning 68 of the 200 seats. Voter turnout was 76%.

== Campaign ==
The campaign was primarily a conflict between the right-wing ODS and left-wing ČSSD. The ODS used slogans "Freedom and Prosperity" and "We proved that we can." ČSSD used slogan "Humanity against selfishness." ČSSD used an autobus called "Zemák" during its campaign. Party's leader Miloš Zeman campaigned with it at multiple places over the Czech Republic. ODS on the other hand used endorsements of public celebrities such as Lucie Bílá. Both parties used meetings with voters as their campaign instrument.

=== Finances ===
Party	Money spent (Kč)
Civic Democratic Party	127,000,000
Czech Social Democratic Party	80,000,000
Christian and Democratic Union – Czechoslovak People's Party	55,000,000
Civic Democratic Alliance	40,000,000
Communist Party of Bohemia and Moravia	8,000,000
Source: České Noviny

== Opinion polls ==
View source data.

Date	Polling firm	ODS	ČSSD	KSČM	KDU-ČSL	SPR-RSČ	ODA	DŽJ	DEU	SD-LSNS	LB	Others
31 May–1 June	Election results	29.6	26.4	10.3	8.1	8.0	6.4	3.1	2.8	2.1	1.4	1.8
May 1996	STEM	24.0	19.3	10.3	8.7	7.1	9.1	n/a	n/a	n/a	n/a	
4–7 May 1996	IVVM	21.8	17.7	7.3	7.1	5.8	5.8	2.8	2.3	1.9	3.3	
April	IVVM	25.5	15.5	6.2	8.9	5.0	6.8	1.9	1.4	1.9	4.5	
March	IVVM	25.5	15.3	6.0	6.7	4.7	8.1	1.2	1.7	1.9	4.2	
February	IVVM	24.7	15.9	6.5	9.1	4.4	8.1	0.9	1.2	3.2	3.8	
January	IVVM	27.2	17.3	7.1	6.7	4.7	6.6	0.7	0.8	2.0	4.7	

== Results ==
Party	Votes	%	Seats	+/–
Civic Democratic Party	1,794,560	29.62	68	–
Czech Social Democratic Party	1,602,250	26.44	61	+45
Communist Party of Bohemia and Moravia	626,136	10.33	22	–13
KDU-ČSL	489,349	8.08	18	+3
SPR-RSČ	485,072	8.01	18	+4
Civic Democratic Alliance	385,369	6.36	13	–1
Pensioners for Life Security	187,455	3.09	0	0
Democratic Union	169,796	2.80	0	New
Free Democrats – Liberal National Social Party	124,165	2.05	0	New
Left Bloc	85,122	1.40	0	New
Independents	30,125	0.50	0	New
Bohemian-Moravian Centre Union	27,490	0.45	0	New
HSMSMNSJ	25,198	0.42	0	New
Moravian National Party	16,580	0.27	0	New
Party of the Democratic Left	7,740	0.13	0	New
Czech Right	2,808	0.05	0	New
Total	6,059,215	100.00	200	0
Valid votes	6,059,215	99.39		
Invalid/blank votes	37,189	0.61		
Total votes	6,096,404	100.00		
Registered voters/turnout	7,990,770	76.29		
Source: Nohlen & Stöver

=== Vote share by district ===
ODS

ČSSD

KSČM

KDU-ČSL

SPR-RSČ

ODA
