= 1998 Czech parliamentary election =

1998 Czech legislative election
- 19–20 June 1998

All 200 seats in the Chamber of Deputies 101 seats needed for a majority
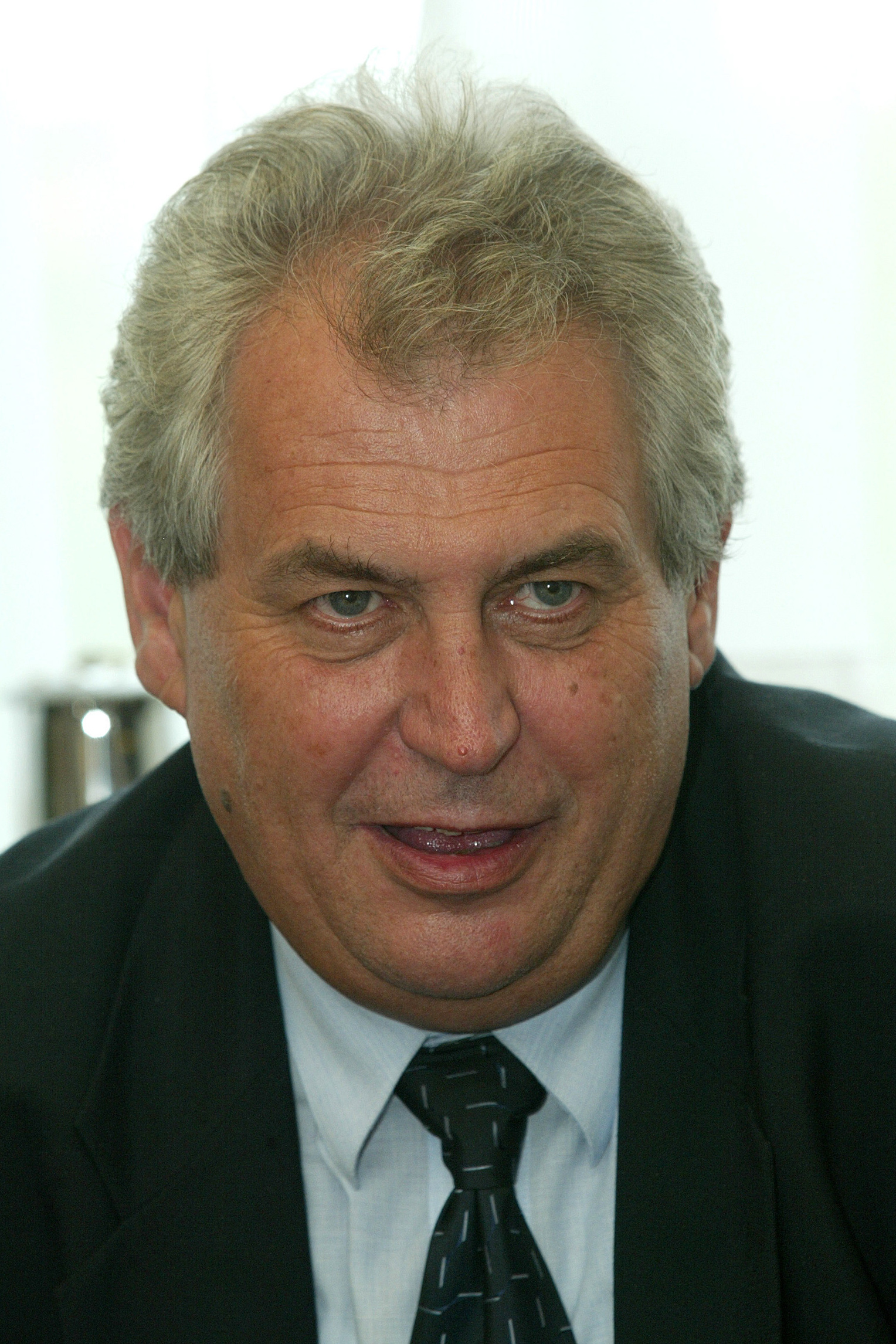

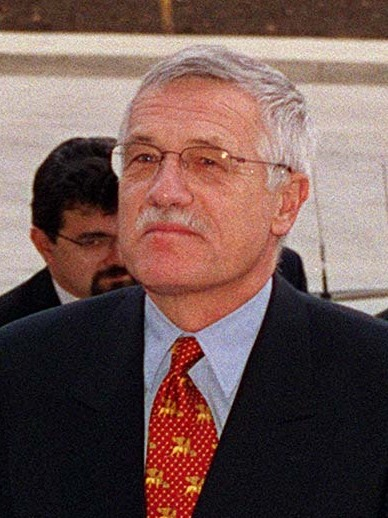

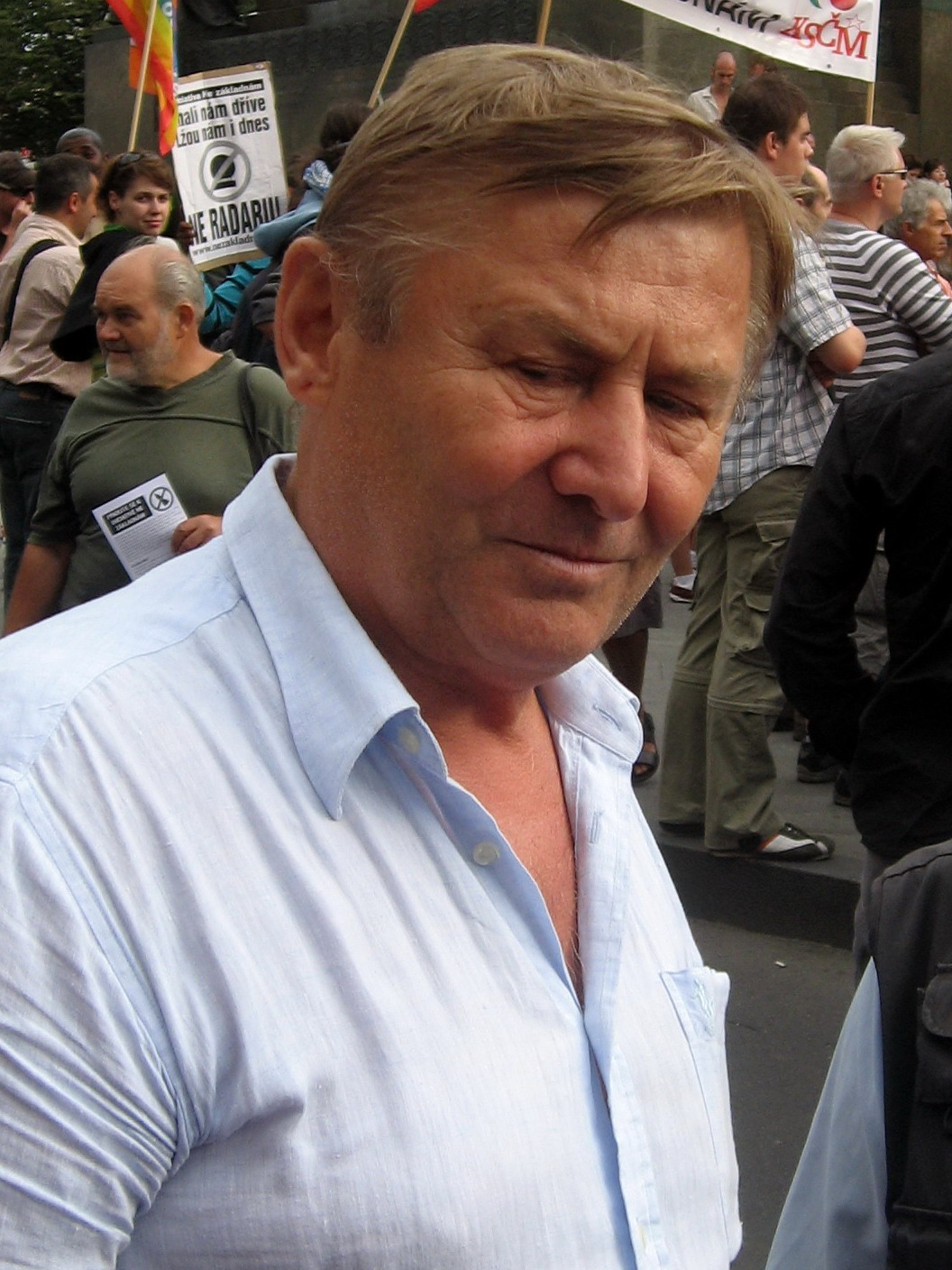

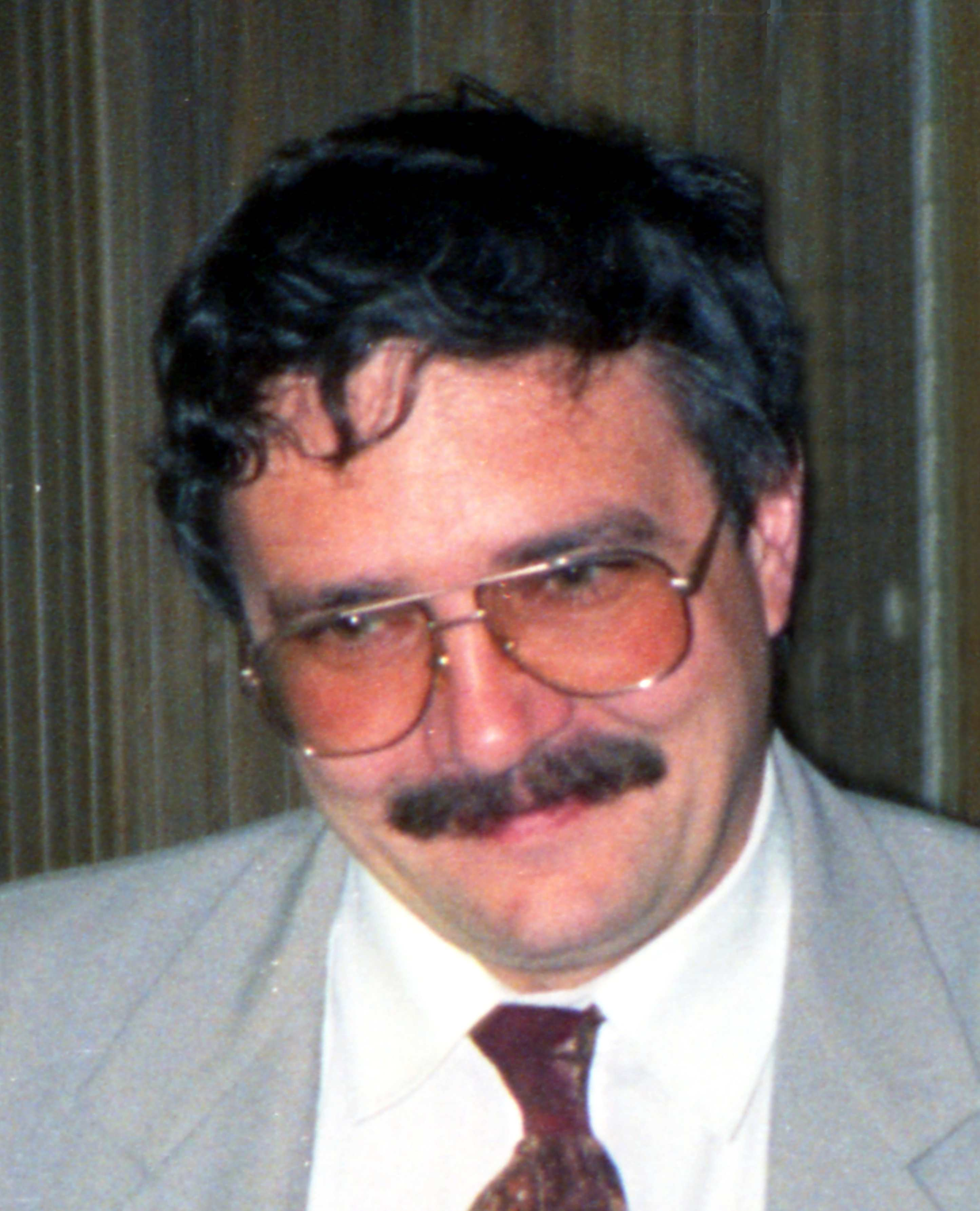

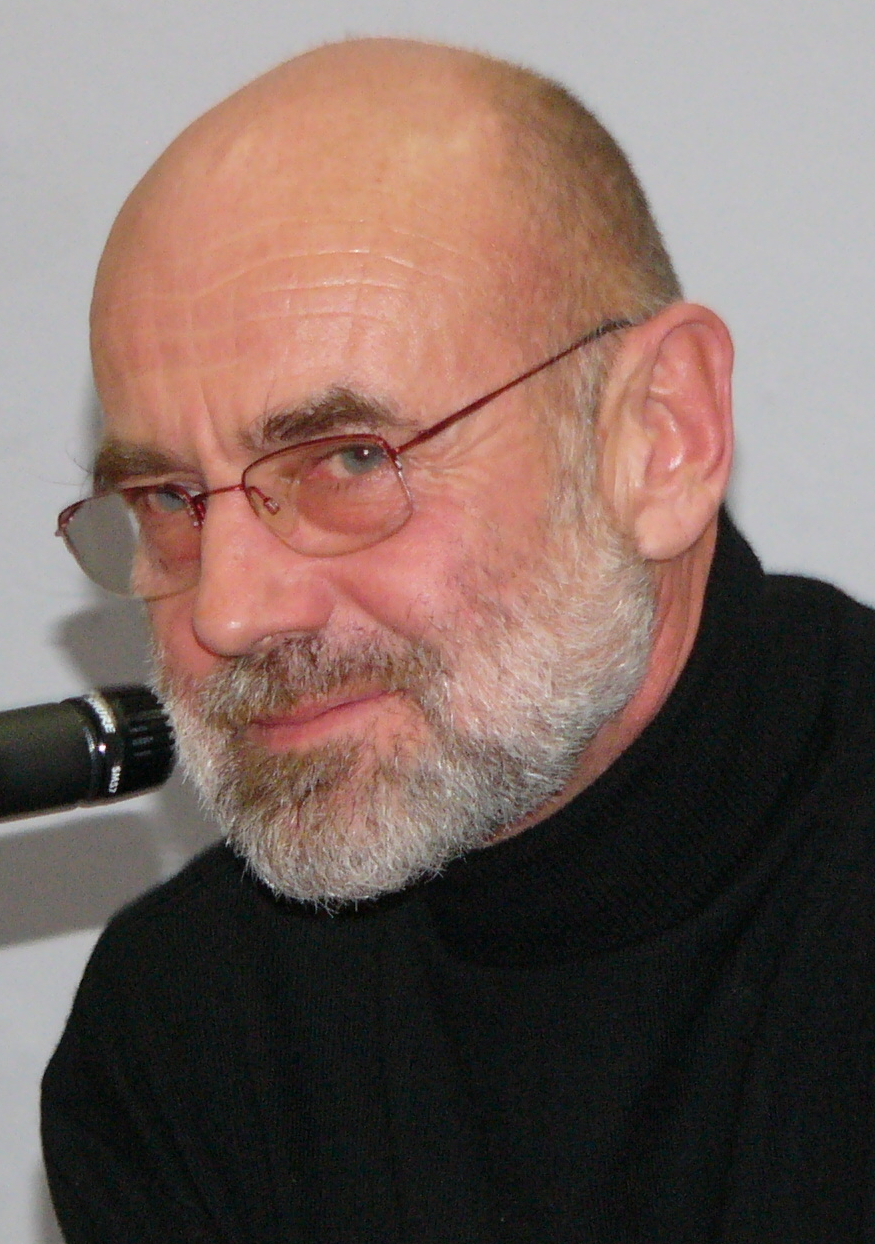
	First party	Second party	Third party
Leader	Miloš Zeman	Václav Klaus	Miroslav Grebeníček
Party	ČSSD	ODS	KSČM
Seats won	74	63	24
Seat change	▲13	▼5	▲2
Popular vote	1,928,660	1,656,011	658,550
Percentage	32.31%	27.74%	11.03%
Swing	▲2.69 pp	▼1.88 pp	▲1.30 pp
	Fourth party	Fifth party
Leader	Josef Lux	Jan Ruml
Party	KDU-ČSL	US
Seats won	20	19
Seat change	▲2	New
Popular vote	537,013	513,596
Percentage	8.99%	8.60%
Swing	▲0.91pp	New
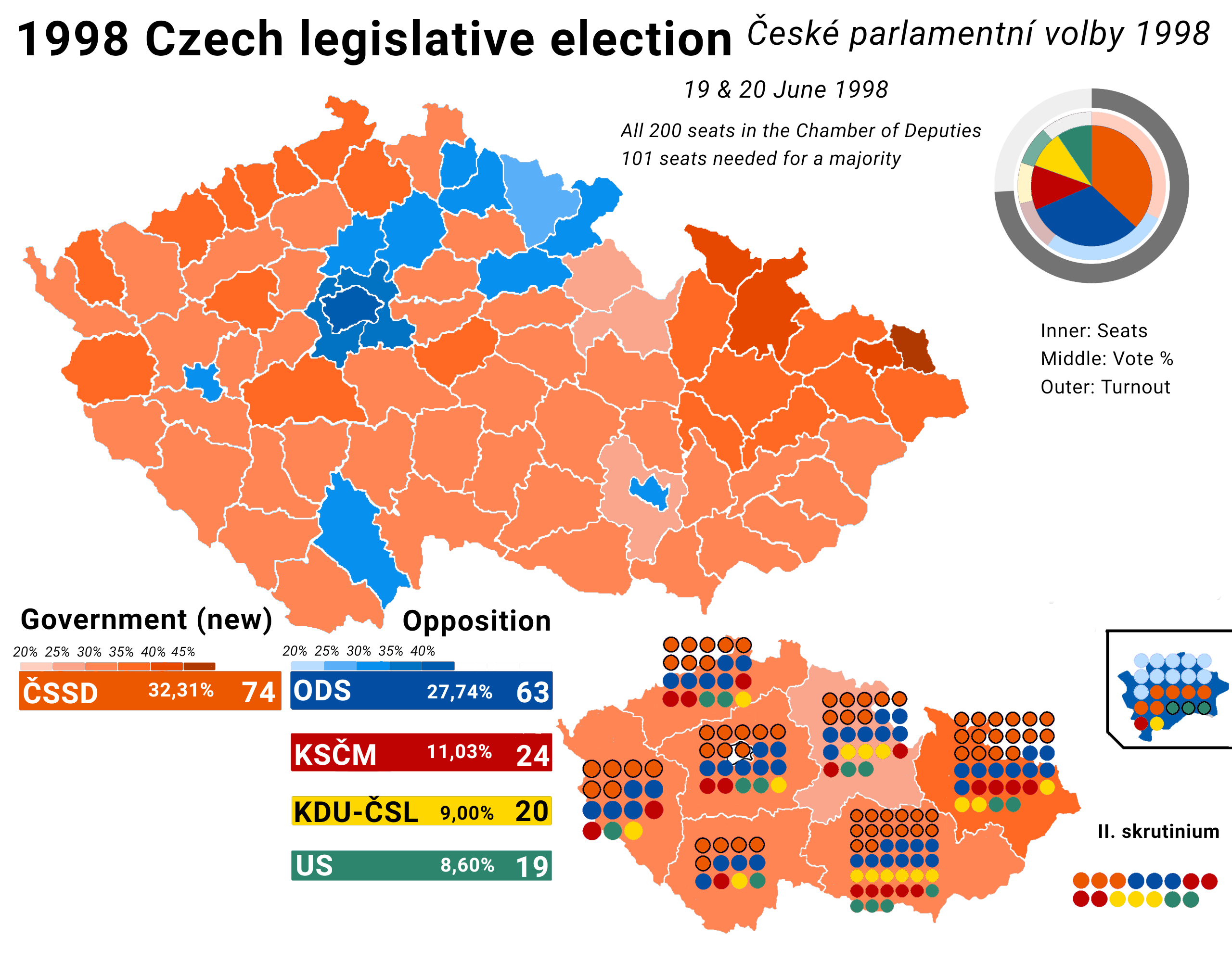
Prime Minister before election
Josef Tošovský
Independent
Prime Minister after election
Miloš Zeman
ČSSD

Parliamentary elections were held in the Czech Republic on 19 and 20 June 1998. The Czech Social Democratic Party emerged as the largest party, winning 74 of the 200 seats. Voter turnout was 73.9%.

== Background ==
The Civic Democratic Party (ODS) won the 1996 parliamentary elections, subsequently forming a minority government led by Václav Klaus, and supported by the Czech Social Democratic Party (ČSSD). The government lasted until 1998, when it resigned during a political crisis that caused the division of ODS and the disintegration of the ruling coalition. Snap elections were called for June 1998.

== Campaign ==
ODS was threatened by the creation of a new party, the Freedom Union, formed by former ODS members who left after a dispute with Václav Klaus. ODS was polling at around 10%, with the Freedom Union expected to replace it as the largest right-wing party. ČSSD was expected to win by large margin. ODS launched their campaign with warnings that a new government would contain Communist Party members, and its leader Klaus was featured heavily during the campaign. ČSSD criticised the work of Klaus' cabinet and re-used slogans from the 1996 campaign, as well as promising to fight corruption.

=== Finances ===
Party	Money spent (Kč)
Civic Democratic Party	30,000,000
Czech Social Democratic Party	30,000,000
Christian and Democratic Union – Czechoslovak People's Party	30,000,000
Communist Party of Bohemia and Moravia	8,000,000
Freedom Union	2,000,000
Source: České Noviny

== Opinion polls ==
Polling firm	Date	ODS	ČSSD	KSČM	KDU-ČSL	ODA	US	SPR-RSČ	DŽJ	Others
STEM	January 1998	15.0	32.0	10.0	11.0	n/a	n/a	5.0	n/a	27.0
IVVM	January 1998	15.4	28.0	8.6	11.1	5.3	n/a	3.5	0.6	26.4
STEM	February 1998	12.0	29.0	11.0	9.0	n/a	11.0	8.0	n/a	20.0
IVVM	March 1998	10.3	25.7	8.0	7.7	1.2	12.6	5.4	1.6	27.9
STEM	March 1998	11.0	30.0	9.0	9.0	n/a	18.0	8.0	n/a	15.0
STEM	April 1998	16.0	24.0	11.0	9.0	1.4	13.0	6.0	4.0	15.6
IVVM (for US)	April 1998	15.9	23.7	10.7	9.1	1.3	12.7	5.7	6.2	3.3
IVVM	April 1998	11.3	25.1	10.0	8.0	0.4	12.0	4.6	4.9	23.5
STEM	May 1998	16.0	25.0	11.0	9.0	n/a	14.0	5.0	n/a	20.0
IVVM (for US)	May 1998	16.3	25.4	10.5	9.0	1.3	13.7	5.1	6.3	3.2
IVVM	May 1998	14.2	22.1	8.5	5.8	0.6	9.1	3.9	10.2	26.2
IVVM	June 1998	15.0	22.5	7.4	7.1	n/a	6.8	4.2	9.0	26.8
STEM	June 1998	19.0	22.0	9.0	7.0	n/a	8.0	5.0	n/a	30.0
Sofres Factum	10 June 1998	19.5	26.7	9.0	6.0	n/a	5.4	n/a	n/a	12.9
Sofres Factum	12 June 1998	19.1	29.3	9.1	6.0	n/a	6.9	n/a	n/a	8.3
STEM	12 June 1998	20.7	23.2	10.3	8.8	n/a	8.4	n/a	n/a	9.1
Sofres Factum	17 June 1998	21.4	27.6	9.2	7.5	n/a	7.1	n/a	n/a	10.3
Exit Polls
IFES and SC&C	20 June 1998	27.1	32.2	11.4	9.2	n/a	8.5	3.9	3.0	
Sofres Factum	20 June 1998	27.0	32.0	11.0	9.2	n/a	8.4	3.8	3.8	
Election results	19-20 June 1998	27.7	32.3	11.0	9.0	0	8.6	3.9	3.1	3.5

== Results ==
Party	Votes	%	Seats	+/–
Czech Social Democratic Party	1,928,660	32.31	74	+13
Civic Democratic Party	1,656,011	27.74	63	–5
Communist Party of Bohemia and Moravia	658,550	11.03	24	+2
KDU-ČSL	537,013	9.00	20	+2
Freedom Union	513,596	8.60	19	New
SPR-RSČ	232,965	3.90	0	–18
Pensioners for Life Security	182,900	3.06	0	0
Democratic Union	86,431	1.45	0	0
Green Party	67,143	1.12	0	New
Independents	51,981	0.87	0	0
Moravian Democratic Party	22,282	0.37	0	New
Czech National Social Party	17,185	0.29	0	New
Civic Coalition – Political Club	14,788	0.25	0	New
Total	5,969,505	100.00	200	0
Valid votes	5,969,505	99.58		
Invalid/blank votes	25,339	0.42		
Total votes	5,994,844	100.00		
Registered voters/turnout	8,116,836	73.86		
Source: Nohlen & Stöver, Volby

=== Vote share by district ===
ODS

CSSD

KSCM

KDU CSL

SPR RSC
