= Václav Klaus =

President of the Czech Republic from 2003 to 2013

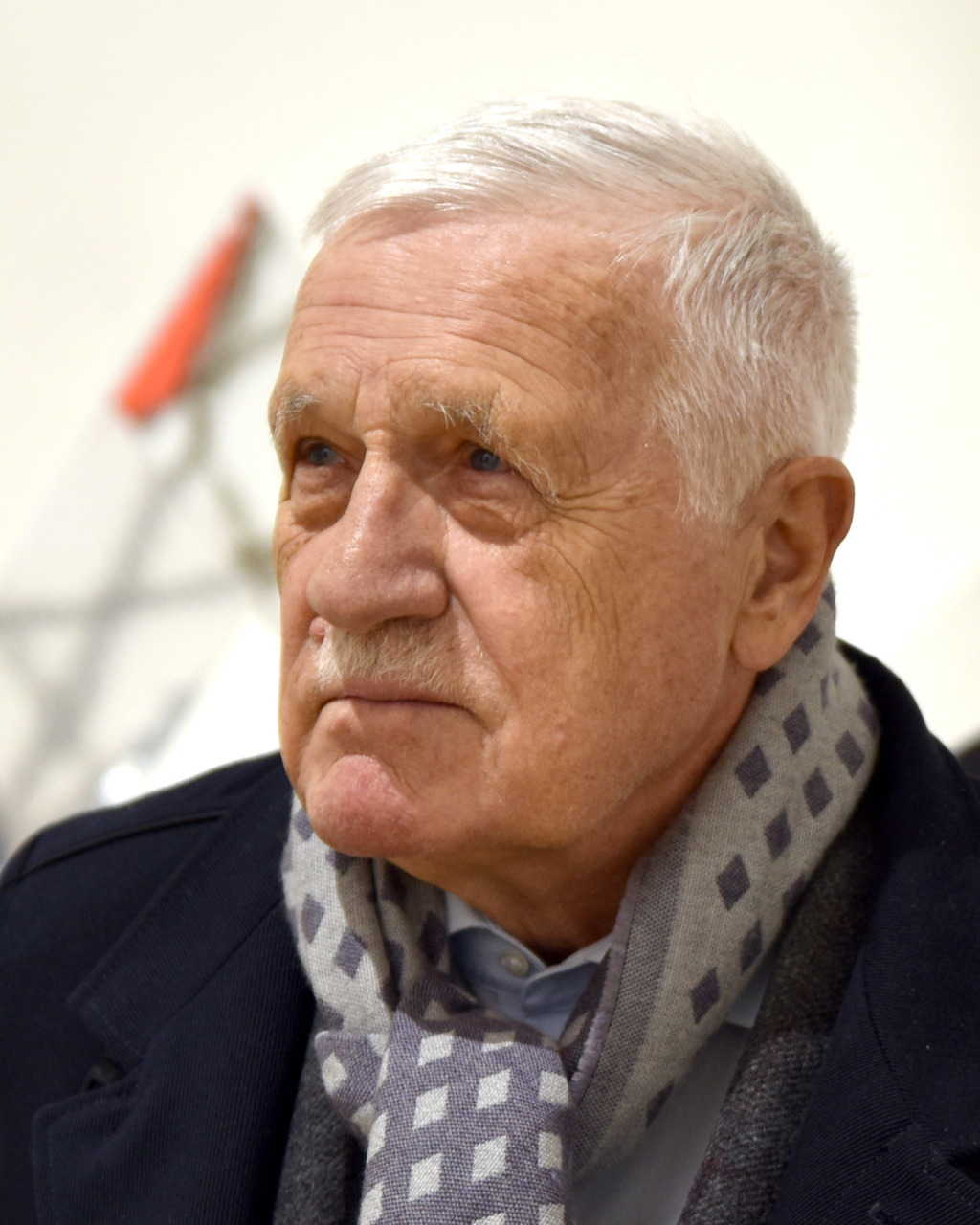
- Klaus in 2022

2nd President of the Czech Republic
- In office 7 March 2003 – 7 March 2013
- Prime Minister: Vladimír Špidla; Stanislav Gross; Jiří Paroubek; Mirek Topolánek; Jan Fischer; Petr Nečas
- Preceded by: Václav Havel
- Succeeded by: Miloš Zeman

Prime Minister of the Czech Republic
- In office 1 January 1993 – 2 January 1998
- President: Václav Havel
- Preceded by: Position established
- Succeeded by: Josef Tošovský

President of the Chamber of Deputies
- In office 17 July 1998 – 20 June 2002
- Preceded by: Miloš Zeman
- Succeeded by: Lubomír Zaorálek

Leader of the Civic Democratic Party
- In office 21 April 1991 – 15 December 2002
- Preceded by: Position established
- Succeeded by: Mirek Topolánek

Prime Minister of the Czech Republic (Federal part)
- In office 2 July 1992 – 31 December 1992
- President: Václav Havel
- Preceded by: Petr Pithart
- Succeeded by: Position abolished

Member of the Chamber of Deputies
- In office 7 June 1990 – 7 March 2003

Minister of Finance of Czechoslovakia
- In office 10 December 1989 – 2 July 1992
- Prime Minister: Marián Čalfa
- Preceded by: Jan Stejskal
- Succeeded by: Jan Klak

Personal details
- Born: 19 June 1941 (age 85) Prague, Protectorate of Bohemia and Moravia
- Party: OF (1989–1991); ODS (1991–2003); Independent (2003–present)
- Other political affiliations: National Council of European Resistance
- Spouse: Livia Mištinová (m. 1968)
- Children: Václav; Jan
- Relatives: Zoë Pastelle (grandniece)
- Education: University of Economics, Prague, Cornell University
- Website: Official website

Václav Klaus (Note: Czech pronunciation: [ˈvaːtslaf ˈklaus]) (born 19 June 1941) is a Czech economist and politician who served as the second president of the Czech Republic from 2003 to 2013. From July 1992 until the dissolution of Czechoslovakia in January 1993, he served as the second and last prime minister of the Czech Republic while it was a federal subject of the Czech and Slovak Federative Republic, and then as the first prime minister of the newly independent Czech Republic from 1993 to 1998.

During the Communist era, Klaus worked as a bank clerk and forecaster. After the fall of Communism in November 1989, he became the Minister of Finance in the "government of national unity". In 1991, Klaus was the principal co-founder of the Civic Democratic Party (ODS). He was prime minister from 1992 to 1998, and from January to February 1993 he held certain powers of the Presidency.

His government fell in the autumn of 1997; after the elections in the spring of 1998, he became the president of the Chamber of Deputies (1998–2002). After ODS lost the parliamentary elections of 2002, he withdrew from politics briefly, before being elected President of the Czech Republic in February 2003. He was re-elected in 2008 for a second five-year term. His presidency was marked by many controversies over his strong opinions on issues ranging from global warming denial to Euroscepticism, and a wide-ranging amnesty declared in his last months of office, triggering his indictment by the Czech Senate on charges of high treason.

Klaus left active politics after his second presidential term ended in March 2013 but continues to comment on domestic and foreign policy issues. He has expressed support for European far-right parties including Alternative for Germany, the Freedom Party of Austria, and Fidesz. His political views have been referred to as Klausism.

== Early life ==
Klaus was born in Prague during the Nazi occupation, and grew up in the large, then middle-class neighbourhood of Vinohrady. Klaus has claimed that he helped build barricades during the Prague uprising in May 1945, at the age of three.

Klaus studied Economics of Foreign Trade at the University of Economics, Prague, graduating in 1963. He also spent some time at universities in Italy (1966) and at Cornell University in the United States in 1969. He then pursued a postgraduate academic career at the State Institute of Economics of the Czechoslovak Academy of Sciences, which, according to his autobiography, he was forced to leave in 1970.

Soon after that he was employed by the Czechoslovak State Bank, where he held various staff positions from 1971 to 1986, as well as working abroad in various Soviet-aligned countries, usually considered a privilege at the time. In 1987, Klaus joined the Institute for Prognostics of the Czechoslovak Academy of Sciences.

== Rise to premiership ==
Klaus entered Czechoslovak politics during the Velvet Revolution in 1989, during the second week of the political uprising, when he offered his services as an economic advisor to the Civic Forum, whose aim was to unify the anti-government movements in Czechoslovakia and overthrow the Communist regime. Klaus became Czechoslovakia's Minister of Finance in the "government of national unity" on 10 December 1989.

In October 1990, Klaus was elected chairman of the Civic Forum. Two months later, he led supporters of a free-market economy into the break-away Civic Democratic Party (Czech: Občanská demokratická strana or ODS). Following a period of strong economic growth, Klaus led ODS to the largest vote share (29.73%) in Czech parliamentary elections on 5–6 June 1992. ODS emerged as by far the largest party, with 76 seats, and Klaus thus became the first democratically elected Prime Minister of the Czech Republic.

ODS also performed strongly in the Czechoslovak federal election held the same day, becoming the largest party with 48 seats, double the number of the runners-up, the Movement for a Democratic Slovakia (HZDS). However, ODS would still have needed support from HZDS to form a government. When he began coalition talks with HZDS leader Vladimir Meciar, Klaus told Meciar that unless HZDS was willing to agree to a tighter federation, the only alternative was for the Czechs and Slovaks to form independent nations. As Meciar was unwilling to agree to the former option, on 23 July the two leaders agreed to dissolve Czechoslovakia, to take effect on 1 January 1993.

Klaus led ODS to be the party with the largest vote share (29.62%) in the 1996 parliamentary elections, and remained prime minister in a minority government. However, towards the end of 1997 he was forced to step down as prime minister by opponents in his party in connection with accusations of funding irregularities in the ODS.

During his term as prime minister, President Václav Havel heavily criticized Klaus' policy of voucher privatization of previously state-owned enterprises. The policy was designed to bring about a speedy transition from command economy to free-market economy, but Havel cited the voucher privatization as a cause of the country's subsequent economic problems.

== Leader of the opposition (1997–2002) ==
At a party congress in late 1997, Klaus was re-elected as chairman of ODS by 227 votes to 72 votes. The defeated faction subsequently left ODS, and in early 1998 established a new party, the Freedom Union (Czech: Unie svobody), with President Havel's support.

ODS finished second in early elections in 1998, behind the Czech Social Democratic Party (ČSSD). Either party could have formed a majority with the support of other parties, but Freedom Union chairman Jan Ruml, despite his animosity to Klaus, refused to support ČSSD. Instead, Klaus negotiated the "Opposition Agreement" (Czech: opoziční smlouva) with ČSSD chairman Miloš Zeman, his long-time political adversary. During the following legislative period, ODS allowed Zeman's ČSSD to rule with a minority government, in exchange for a number of parliamentary posts, including the post of the President of the Chamber of Deputies, occupied by Klaus himself. The Opposition Agreement led to public demonstrations, particularly against an attempt to regulate Czech Television. This led Zeman to announce that he would not stand again for the post of prime minister.

In the elections of June 2002, ODS was again defeated by ČSSD under their new leader Vladimír Špidla, who had previously opposed the Opposition Agreement, and instead formed a coalition with centrist parties. After a long period of deliberation, and even though ODS won Senate elections in October 2002, Klaus did not run for re-election as party chairman at the December ODS congress. However, he was made honorary chairman of the party. Against his declared preference, Klaus was succeeded as party leader by Mirek Topolánek.

== Presidency (2003–2013) ==
Standard of the president of the Czech Republic

Having lost two general elections in a row, Klaus announced his intention to step down from the leadership and run for president to succeed his political opponent Václav Havel. The governing coalition was unable to agree on a common candidate to oppose him.

Klaus was elected President of the Czech Republic on 28 February 2003, in the third round of the election, in which both chambers vote together at a joint session of the Parliament by secret ballot between the two top candidates. He won with a majority of 142 votes out of 281. It was widely reported that Klaus won due to the support of Communist Members of Parliament, support which his opponent, Jan Sokol, had publicly refused to accept. Klaus denied that he owed the Communists any debt for his election.

Petr Hájek, the deputy chancellor, spokesperson and long-time advisor to Václav Klaus, was described by Der Spiegel as a controversial "conspiracy theorist" who amplified the president's radical rhetoric, including public claims questioning the existence of Osama bin Laden and promoting 9/11 conspiracies.

=== Use of vetoes ===
Although Klaus regularly criticized Václav Havel for using his Presidential Veto powers to block laws and promised restraint, he used his veto more frequently than Havel. He vetoed the Anti-Discrimination Law passed by parliament in 2008, describing it as a dangerous threat to personal freedoms. He also vetoed a bill implementing the European Union's Registration, Evaluation, Authorisation, and Restriction of Chemicals policy, saying it was a burden for private businesses.

=== Euroscepticism ===
Klaus' Euroscepticism, alongside his scepticism of human impact on the environment and climate change, formed the cornerstones of his policy as president. He expressed the opinion that accession to the European Union would mean a significant reduction of Czech sovereignty, and did not endorse either side in the 2003 accession referendum, in which 77% voted yes.

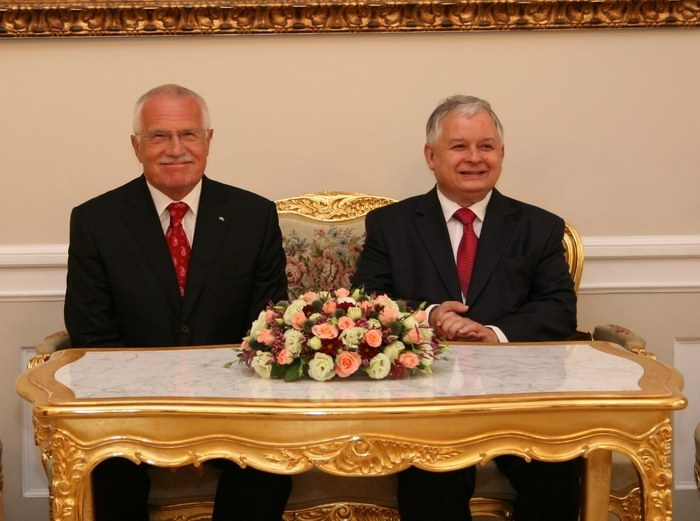
Václav Klaus with Lech Kaczyński during his state visit to Poland in 2007.

Klaus has alleged a gradual loss of sovereignty for member states in favour of the EU. He promoted the publication of a text by the Irish Eurosceptic Anthony Coughlan. In 2005 Klaus called for the EU to be "scrapped" and replaced by a free trade area to be called the "Organisation of European States". He also claimed that the EU as an institution undermines freedom, calling the EU "as big a threat to freedom as the Soviet Union was".

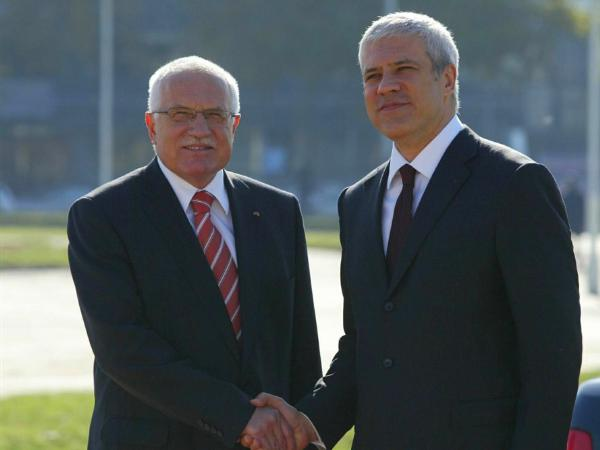
Václav Klaus with Boris Tadić during his state visit to Serbia in 2008.

In November 2008, during a stay in Ireland after a state visit, Klaus held a joint press conference with Declan Ganley, head of Libertas, which was at that time campaigning for a "no" vote in a referendum on the Lisbon Treaty. Members of the Irish government called this an "inappropriate intervention", and "unusual and disappointing".

==== European Parliament ====
On 5 December 2008, members of the Conference of Presidents of the European Parliament visited the Czech Republic prior to the start of the Czech presidency of the European Union. They were invited by Václav Klaus to meet him at Prague Castle. The chairman of Green Group, Daniel Cohn-Bendit, brought a European flag and presented it to Klaus. Cohn-Bendit also said that he "did not care about Klaus' opinions on the Lisbon Treaty, that Klaus would simply have to sign it". This was criticised by some Czech commentators as "undue interference in Czech affairs".

At the same meeting, Irish MEP Brian Crowley told Klaus that the Irish people wanted ratification of the Treaty of Lisbon and were "insulted" by Klaus' association with Declan Ganley and Libertas. Klaus responded that "the biggest insult to the Irish people is not to accept the results of the Irish referendum". Crowley replied, "You will not tell me what the Irish think. As an Irishman, I know it best". British Eurosceptic journalist Christopher Booker wrote that the meeting "confirms the inability of the Euro-elite to accept that anyone holds views different from their own".

On 19 February 2009, Klaus made a speech to the European Parliament where he criticized what he perceived as the European Union's lack of democracy, continuing integration and economic policies:

The present decision-making system of the European Union is different from a classic parliamentary democracy, tested and proven by history. In a normal parliamentary system, part of the MPs support the government and part support the opposition. In the European Parliament, this arrangement has been missing. Here, only one single alternative is being promoted, and those who dare think about a different option are labelled as enemies of European integration... There is also a great distance (not only in a geographical sense) between citizens and Union representatives, which is much greater than is the case inside the member countries. This distance is often described as the democratic deficit, the loss of democratic accountability, the decision-making of the unelected – but selected – ones, as bureaucratisation of decision-making etc. The proposals to change the current state of affairs – included in the rejected European Constitution or in the not much different Lisbon Treaty – would make this defect even worse. Since there is no European demos – and no European nation – this defect cannot be solved by strengthening the role of the European Parliament, either.

After this point was made, a number of MEPs walked out of the chamber. Klaus continued:

I fear that the attempts to speed up and deepen integration and to move decisions about the lives of the citizens of the member countries up to the European level can have effects that will endanger all the positive things achieved in Europe in the last half a century... Let us not allow a situation where the citizens of member countries would live their lives with a resigned feeling that the EU project is not their own; that it is developing differently than they would wish, that they are only forced to accept it. We would very easily and very soon slip back to the times that we hoped belonged to history.

==== Eurozone ====
Klaus was a frequent critic of centrally implemented economic policies in the European Union, and of the adoption of the Euro as the common currency of the eurozone countries. Around the 10th anniversary of the euro in 2008 he wrote in the Financial Times that "in practice, the existence of the euro has shown that forcing an economically disparate Europe into a homogeneous entity through a political decision is political engineering par excellence, far from beneficial for all countries concerned".

==== Signing the Lisbon treaty ====
Klaus long refused to sign the Treaty of Lisbon, and was the last head of state in the EU to provide a signature. Other European leaders ignored his reluctance, stating that they would not consent to being "held hostage" by the Czech President. The Czech Prime Minister Jan Fischer, however, said that Klaus would eventually sign the treaty, saying: "There is no reason for anxiety in Europe. The question is not Yes or No, it is only when".

In November 2008 Klaus said in an interview with the Czech Television that if he was the only person standing in the way of a treaty that all others agreed upon, he would not block it. Václav Klaus signed the Treaty of Lisbon on 3 November 2009. However he never signed the addition to the Lisbon Treaty, the European Financial Stability Facility (EFSF), which was eventually signed by his successor as president, Miloš Zeman.

=== Views on Russia ===
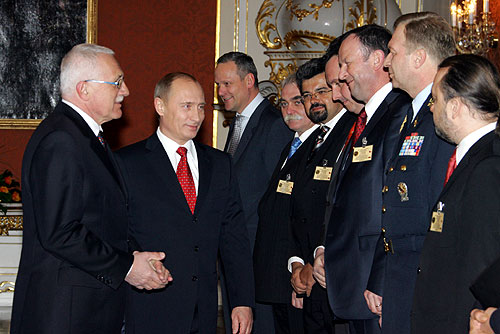
Vaclav Klaus and President Putin.

Klaus has sought cooperation with Russia on issues including energy policy.

In the 1990s, Klaus promoted renewed oil and gas agreements between the Czech Republic and Russia, and opposed Czech attempts to develop other energy sources, including the construction of a pipeline between the Czech Republic and Germany. According to former Czech secret service directors, he was warned by the secret service of Russian organized crime spreading into the Czech economy. In one scheme, oil was imported to the Czech Republic as heating oil and re-sold as diesel, creating huge profits for Russian businessman Semion Mogilevich, alleged to be a key figure in the Russian mafia.

In March 2006, Klaus was described by The Economist as one of Russian President Vladimir Putin's "warmest admirers abroad". Klaus was awarded the 2007 Pushkin Medal by Putin for the promotion of Russian culture. It was suggested that this was partly due to his use of the Russian language when speaking to Putin and Russian diplomats. Klaus said that in relations with Russia there have been "challenges and successes, tremendous successes".

On the other hand, in a May 2009 interview with Lidové noviny, Klaus said that Russia was not a threat, but was still a big, strong and ambitious country, of which the Czech authorities should beware more than countries like Estonia and Lithuania should.

=== Kosovo ===
Klaus criticised NATO bombing of Yugoslavia during the Kosovo War, and was subsequently a frequent critic of the unilateral Kosovo declaration of independence. During a visit to Slovakia in March 2008, Klaus stated his disagreement with the argument that Kosovo was an exceptional case, and suggested that the precedent set by the recognition of Kosovo would open a "Pandora's box" in Europe, leading to disastrous consequences. He compared the situation of Serbia to the 1938 Munich Agreement. When Serbia recalled its ambassador in protest at the Czech government's recognition of Kosovo, Klaus invited the Serbian ambassador to Prague Castle for a friendly farewell. During a visit to Serbia in January 2011, Klaus stated that as long as he was president the Czech Republic would not appoint an ambassador to Kosovo.

=== Re-election ===
Unlike previous Czech presidential elections, the election of 2008 was conducted using on the record voting rather than a secret ballot. This change was demanded by several Czech political parties after the previous elections in 2003, but opposed by Klaus' ODS, which, having strengthened since 2003, had a comfortable majority in the Senate on its own, and only needed to secure a few votes in the House for the third round.

Klaus' opponent was the former émigré, naturalized United States citizen and University of Michigan economics professor Jan Švejnar. He was nominated by the Green Party as a pro-EU moderate candidate, and also gained the support of the leading opposition Social Democratic Party, a small number of deputies and senators of KDU-ČSL and some independent Senators. The first ballot on 8–9 February 2008 resulted in no winner. Švejnar won the Chamber of Deputies, but Klaus led in the assembly as a whole and only just failed to achieve the required majority.

The second ballot on 15 February 2008 included a new candidate MEP Jana Bobošíková, nominated by the Communist Party. However, without any further support, she withdrew her candidacy before the election, and the second round ended similarly to the previous one, with Klaus remaining on 141 votes. Therefore, in the third round, where only a simple majority of all legislators present from both houses was required, Klaus won by one vote, with Švejnar receiving 111 votes, and the 29 Communists voting for neither.

Klaus's first term as president concluded on 7 March 2008, and he took his oath for the second term on the same day so as to avoid an interim without a president and allow Parliament to come to a joint session earlier. He therefore lost the day of overlap, meaning his second term ended on 6 March 2013.

=== Resignation as honorary ODS chairman ===
Václav Klaus resigned as Honorary Chairman of ODS at the party congress on 6 December 2008. The following day his ally Pavel Bém, the Mayor of Prague, lost a vote for the post of ODS chairman against Prime Minister Mirek Topolánek, by 284 votes to 162.

=== Chile pen incident ===
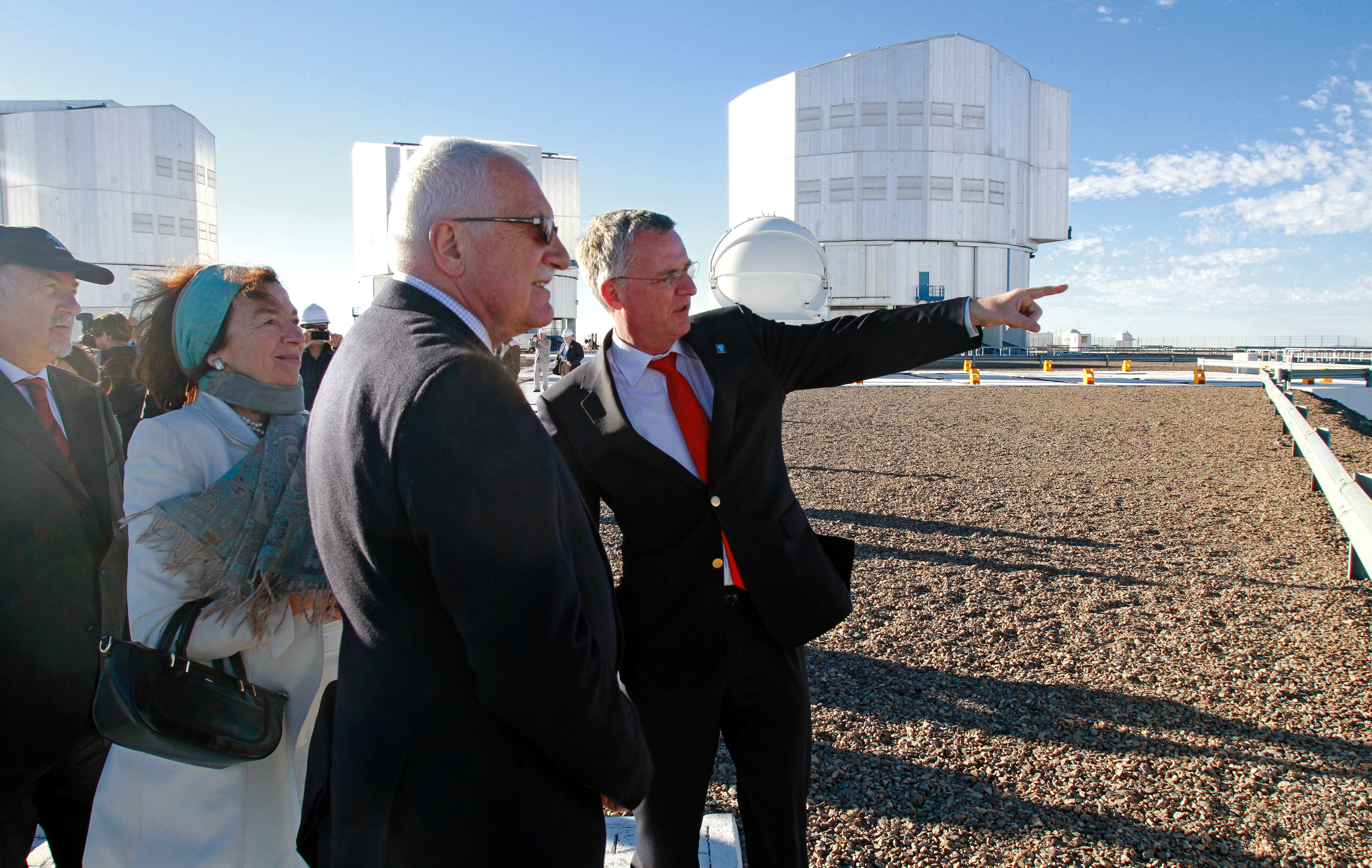
Václav Klaus visiting ESO's Paranal Observatory, Chile.

In April 2011, Klaus was seen taking a pen during a state visit to Chile. The alleged theft, caught on television cameras, was widely reported around the world. According to Klaus, the incident was exaggerated, as official pens are normally free to be taken by official visitors, including in this case.

A spokeswoman for Chilean President Sebastián Piñera said the Chilean President's guests were free to take the pens from meetings.

=== Australian Parliament House incident ===
In July 2011, President Klaus visited Canberra, Australia. The visit was sponsored by the conservative Australian think tank, the Centre for Independent Studies, and so was not afforded the diplomatic protocol of an official visit. While in Canberra Klaus was invited to an interview with the Australian Broadcasting Corporation in their Parliament House studios. On his arrival Klaus was requested to undergo the standard security clearance procedures required for normal members of the public; ABC staff tried to convince security staff to allow the President to bypass security but they refused, and so Klaus left the building.

Klaus stated that it was not an issue of his passing through the electronic security system, but rather his treatment by the officials, as nobody had been there to meet him when he and his entourage arrived. After waiting for ten minutes in front of the building, a worker of the ABC Television invited him in, where he was left "among perhaps as many as hundred school children". After another few minutes he found out that the whole group was waiting for a security clearance. Klaus refused to waste more time waiting in line behind the school children and offered ABC Television to conduct the interview in his hotel. This offer was declined by ABC as they were already set up for the interview in the Parliament House studio.

Klaus' approach was supported by the head of protocol in the Office of the Czech President, Jindřich Forejt, who described the incident as "incredible". Former spokesman for President Václav Havel, Ladislav Špaček, said that "it is absolutely out of place to check a head of state; it is disrespectful. I am not at all surprised that Klaus turned around and went off. He should not be there trying to argue with some operative that he is not a terrorist".

=== Opposition to 2011 Prague gay pride parade ===
Klaus' aide said that "The prepared Prague gay carnival is a pressure action and a political demonstration of a world with deformed values," describing homosexuals as "deviants." The comments attracted widespread criticism from Czech politicians across the political spectrum, as well as from thirteen ambassadors. Klaus defended his aide's comments. Criticizing "homosexualism", he said that homosexuality is something to be tolerated but not celebrated.

=== Airsoft gun assault ===
On 28 September 2012, Klaus was attacked during a bridge opening ceremony in Chrastava. While Klaus was walking through a thick crowd, shaking hands and chatting with bystanders, a 26-year-old man, Pavel Vondrouš, approached him and pressed an airsoft gun against the President's right arm, pulling the trigger seven times before disappearing into the crowd. Klaus was taken to the Military Hospital in Prague with what was described as "minor bruising" for treatment before being discharged. The attacker, a supporter of the Communist Party, was detained after several minutes, but later released. Before he was taken into custody, he told journalists that he had done it "because politicians were blind and deaf to the people's despair". Vondrouš received a suspended sentence in June 2013.

The lack of action from the President's bodyguards was heavily criticised, and the head of the President's security Jiří Sklenka resigned after the incident.

=== 2013 amnesty and accusations of treason ===
On 1 January 2013, using his constitutional powers, Klaus announced an amnesty to mark the 20th anniversary of the Czech Republic's independence. The amnesty took effect on 2 January and released all prisoners sentenced to one year or less whose sentences had not been served, and all prisoners over 75 years of age sentenced to ten years or less whose sentences had not been served, as well as cancelling all court proceedings which had been ongoing for longer than eight years. By 11 January 6,318 prisoners had been released due to the amnesty, with other cases pending the outcome of court appeals. In addition, dozens of high-profile long-running corruption trials ended due to the amnesty, causing the greatest public anger.

The extent of the amnesty was widely criticized in the Czech Republic, with the opposition demanding a vote of no confidence against Prime Minister Petr Nečas, who countersigned it. Meanwhile, a comparison was drawn with actions taken by Klaus's predecessor, Václav Havel, who ordered three amnesties while Czechoslovak and later Czech president (1989–2003). Havel's first amnesty of January 1990 was the largest post-war amnesty, freeing around 23,000 people, two-thirds of the total prison population of 31,000, on the grounds that they had been convicted by a communist court system.

The amnesty sparked a public petition to persuade the Senate of the Czech Republic to charge President Klaus with high treason before the Constitutional court, effectively impeaching him. Within 24 hours of its launch, it had accumulated 24,500 signatures, and by the beginning of February 2013, the petition had been signed by more than 64,000 people. On 4 March 2013, the Senate voted to charge Klaus with high treason, based on five cases in which he was alleged to have violated the constitution, including the amnesty, his refusal to sign the European stability mechanism and his alleged procrastination in nominating judges to the Constitutional Court. The following day, on 5 March, the Constitutional Court rejected a previous motion by a smaller group of senators to cancel the New Year amnesty, thereby removing the issue of the amnesty from the constitutional suit. Given that the sanction for treason committed by the Czech President is the loss of office, and Klaus' term was due to end the following day, the court's verdict was a mere formality, but a guilty verdict would make Klaus ineligible for a third term of office in 2018. Klaus described the move as an attempt by his political opponents to tarnish his presidency.

== Post-presidency ==
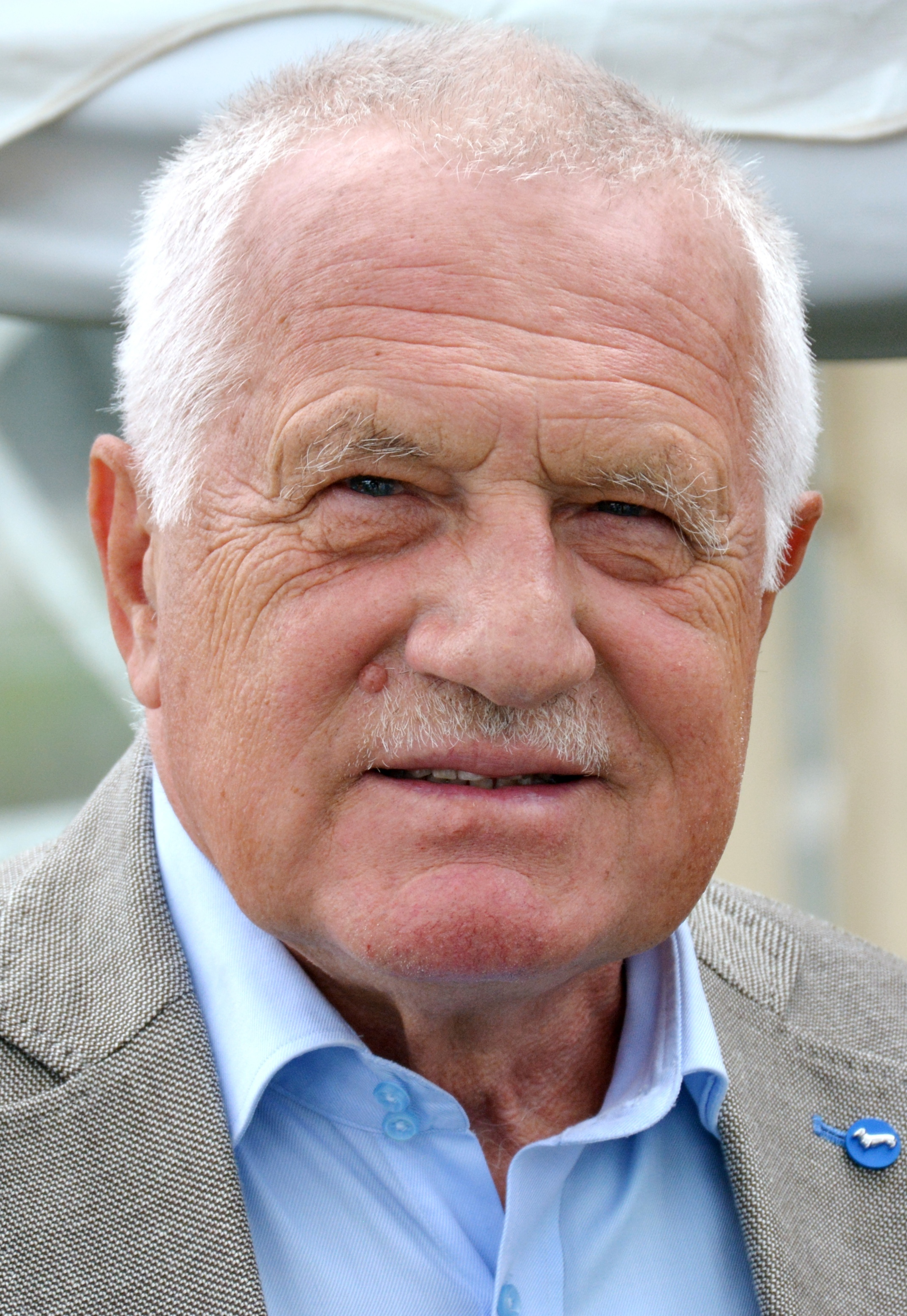
Klaus in 2015

After his presidency ended in 2013, Klaus was named a Distinguished Senior Fellow at the Cato Institute. His fellowship was terminated in September 2014, due to his views on the Revolution of Dignity, his hostility to homosexuality, and support for European far-right parties.

On 9 September 2014, in an interview with Czech radio station Radio Impuls, Klaus said that Ukraine is an artificially created state and that the Russian intervention in the country was part of a civil war. He continued by describing Maidan as an "artificial event created by the West and the United States", in which Russia was forced to intervene. He added that in his opinion, Ukraine lacks the strong ties to keep the country together.

In the 2018 presidential election, Klaus endorsed his former political opponent Miloš Zeman.

In November 2024, Klaus received media attention after stating on CNN Prima News that female defence ministers are "absurd nonsense".

Klaus repeatedly criticized Foreign Minister Petr Macinka for his pro-Ukrainian and pro-Israeli policies.

On 26 June 2026, Klaus spoke at the 1. Demokratiekongress organized by the far-right Alternative for Germany, where he criticized liberal democracy, the European Union, "green ideology", and what he called the "demonisation of the AfD".

=== Tricolour ===
Klaus' son Václav Klaus Jr. was elected to the Chamber of Deputies in the 2017 election as a member of the Civic Democratic Party. Klaus Jr. was expelled from the party in 2019 following comments in which he compared EU directives to the Holocaust. He founded a new party, the Tricolour Citizens' Movement. Václav Klaus joined Tricolour and became the party's foreign relations adviser.

=== Breach of Covid-19 regulations ===
On 28 October 2020, at a celebration of the formation of an independent Czechoslovak state in 1918, Klaus refused to wear a face mask, in breach of COVID-19 restrictions introduced by Andrej Babiš' government. Klaus described people who wear face masks as supporters of illegal migration, a more powerful European Union and a rapid adoption of the Euro currency. In response, the Prague Public Health Office fined Klaus 10,000 CZK for not wearing a face mask in public. In February 2021 Klaus tested positive for COVID-19. He received treatment at home, and concluded quarantine on 6 March 2021.

== Other activities ==
=== Economic activities ===
In 1995, while prime minister, Klaus was awarded the title of Professor of Finance by his alma mater, the University of Economics, Prague. Since then Klaus has occasionally given economics seminars at the university, focused on his free-market views.

His defining feature as an economist since 1990 has been his enthusiasm for free market economics, as exemplified by Friedrich Hayek and Milton Friedman. According to Klaus, legislation and institutions cannot be created before economic transformation, they have to go hand in hand.

Since 1990, Václav Klaus has received nearly 50 honorary degrees, including from Universidad Francisco Marroquín, and published more than 20 books on various social, political, and economic topics. Klaus is a member of the Mont Pelerin Society. He has published articles in the libertarian Cato Journal. On 28 May 2008, Klaus gave the keynote address at an annual dinner hosted by the Competitive Enterprise Institute, a free market advocacy group in Washington, D.C., and received its Julian L. Simon Memorial Award.

Klaus was elected to become a foreign member of the Serbian Academy of Sciences and Arts in 2009.

=== Climate change skepticism ===
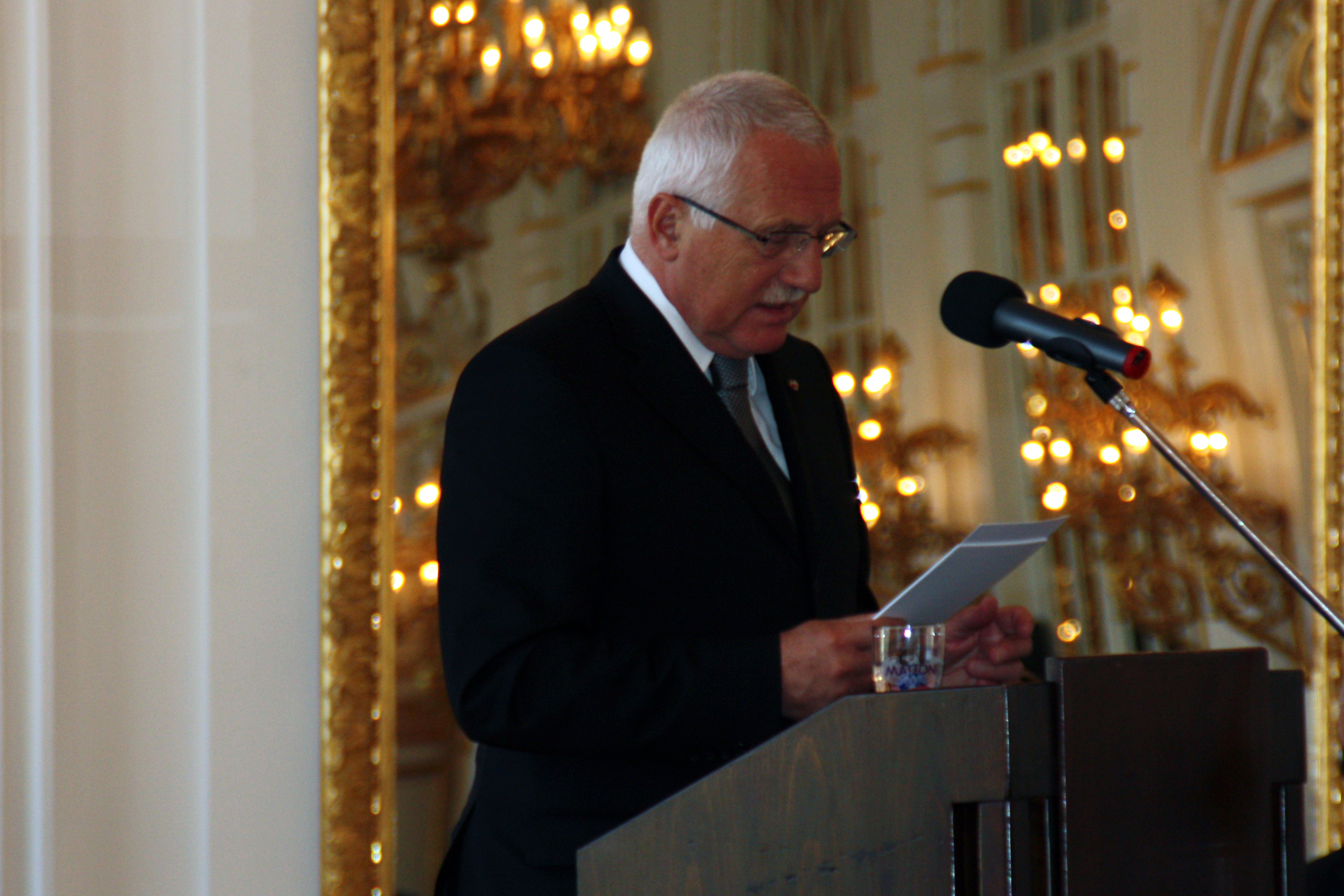
Václav Klaus 2009

Klaus denies that global warming is anthropogenic. He has described the Intergovernmental Panel on Climate Change as "a group of politicized scientists with one-sided opinions and one-sided assignments", and has claimed that some other top-level politicians do not publicly express their doubts about global warming being anthropogenic because "a whip of political correctness strangles their voices".

Addressing the Cato Institute in Washington in March 2007, Klaus expressed the view that "Environmentalism should belong in the social sciences, along with other "isms" such as communism, feminism, and liberalism", and compared environmentalism to a religion, or a "modern counterpart of communism that seeks to change peoples' habits and economic systems".

In a June 2007 article in the Financial Times, Klaus described environmentalism as "the biggest threat to freedom, democracy, a market economy and prosperity". He said that current political and scientific debates on environment issues were designed to suppress freedom and democracy, and asked readers to oppose the term "scientific consensus", adding that "it is always achieved only by a loud minority, never by a silent majority". In an online Q&A session following the article he wrote "Environmentalism, not preservation of nature (and of environment), is a leftist ideology... Environmentalism is indeed a vehicle for bringing us socialist government at the global level. Again, my life in communism has made me oversensitive in this respect". He reiterated these statements at a showing of Martin Durkin's The Great Global Warming Swindle organised by his think tank CEP in June 2007.

In November 2007, on BBC World's HARDtalk, Klaus called the interviewer "absolutely arrogant" for saying that a scientific consensus had been reached on climate change that included most of the world. He added that he was "absolutely certain" that in 30 years people would look back and be grateful to him for his stand on the issue.

At the September 2007 United Nations Climate Change Conference, Klaus restated his rejection of global warming, calling for a second IPCC to be established to produce competing reports, and for countries to be left alone to set their priorities and prepare their own plans for the problem.

In 2007, Klaus published a book entitled Modrá, nikoli zelená planeta (literally: "Blue planet – not green"), which has been translated into various languages. It was published in English under the title Blue Planet in Green Shackles. The book claims that "the theory of global warming and the hypothesis on its causes, which has spread around massively nowadays, may be a bad theory, it may also be a valueless theory, but in any case it is a very dangerous theory".

At the September 2009 UN Climate Change Conference, Klaus again spoke against the conference, calling the gathering "propagandistic" and "undignified".

On 26 July 2011, at the National Press Club Address in Australia, Klaus reiterated his opposition to what he called "global warming doctrine". On 21 May 2012, Klaus addressed the climate sceptic Heartland Institute's Seventh International Conference on Climate Change (ICCC-7). In August 2012 he delivered the Magistral Lecture to the World Federation of Scientists in Erice, Sicily.

On 4 December 2025, Klaus succeeded Guus Berkhout as the president of the Climate Intelligence (Clintel) foundation.

== Personal life ==
Václav Klaus is married to Livia Klausová, a Slovak economist. They have two sons, Václav, also a politician, and Jan, an economist, and five grandchildren.

== State awards ==
=== National ===
- Grand Cross of the Order of the White Lion (28 October 2019)
- Former ex-officio Sovereign of the Order of the White Lion (7 March 2003–7 March 2013)
- Former ex-officio Sovereign of the Order of Tomáš Garrigue Masaryk (7 March 2003–7 March 2013)

=== Foreign ===
- Austria: Grand Star of the Decoration for Services to the Republic of Austria (15 May 2009)
- Germany:

- Saxony: Recipient of the Order of Merit of the Free State of Saxony (17 May 2008)

- Lithuania: Grand Cross with Chain of the Order of Vytautas the Great (9 April 2009)
- Poland: Knight of the Order of the White Eagle (10 July 2007)
- Russia: Recipient of the Medal of Pushkin (27 December 2007)
- Slovakia: First Class of the Order of the White Double Cross (6 March 2013)
- Spain: Collar of the Order of Isabella the Catholic (24 September 2004)
- Albania:Doctor Honoris Causa University of Tirana, For the valuable contribution to the development of the Albanian state, 2010

== See also ==
- Politics of global warming

== Notes ==
Party political offices
New political party	Leader of the Civic Democratic Party; 1991–2002	Succeeded by Mirek Topolánek
Political offices
Preceded by Petr Pithart	Prime Minister of the Czech Socialist Republic; 1992–1993	Position abolished
New office	Prime Minister of the Czech Republic; 1993–1997	Succeeded by Josef Tošovský
Preceded by Miloš Zeman	President of the Chamber of Deputies; 1998–2002	Succeeded by Lubomír Zaorálek
Preceded by Václav Havel	President of the Czech Republic; 2003–2013	Succeeded by Miloš Zeman
