= Freedom Union – Democratic Union =

Freedom Union–Democratic Union Unie svobody–Demokratická unie
- Founded: 1998
- Dissolved: 2011
- Split from: Civic Democratic Party
- Ideology: Liberalism; Liberal conservatism
- Political position: Centre-right
- Colours: Dark green

Website
- www.unie.cz

The Freedom Union–Democratic Union (Czech: Unie Svobody–Demokratická unie, US–DEU) was a small pro-European liberal political party in the Czech Republic from 1998 to 2011.

The Freedom Union was founded in January 1998 by former members of the Civic Democratic Party who were unhappy with the leadership of Václav Klaus. After initially serving in a caretaker government, Freedom Union went into opposition after the 1998 election. In opposition, Freedom Union merged with the Democratic Union, and formed an alliance with the Christian Democratic Union – Czechoslovak People's Party (KDU-ČSL).

From 2002 to 2006 Freedom Union was part of a coalition government with the Social Democratic Party and KDU-ČSL. However, in government the party lost support and at the 2006 election the party won less than 1% of the vote and failed to win any seats. The party disbanded on 1 January 2011.

== History ==
=== Founding ===
The party was founded on 17 January 1998 at a congress in Litomyšl as the Freedom Union (Unie Svobody), as a split from the Civic Democratic Party (ODS). The party was founded after divisions within ODS over the leadership of Václav Klaus, and what the defectors said was his failure to tackle funding scandals. The former interior minister Jan Ruml led a challenge for the ODS leadership, but was defeated by Klaus by 227 votes to 72 at a special congress on 14 December 1997. This prompted 30 ODS members of parliament to form the Freedom Union, including Finance Minister Ivan Pilip and Defence Minister Michal Lobkowicz. The party elected Jan Ruml as its first leader on 2 February 1998.

Pilip and Lobkowicz were among the members of the Freedom Union who served in the caretaker government of Josef Tošovský, formed after the collapse of the coalition led by Václav Klaus. The party initially attracted public support, with a poll in March 1998 showing the Freedom Union on 13%, ahead of ODS on 8%. However the party suffered in the campaign for the June 1998 election, due to a lack of readiness for an election and a vague programme that was seen as being very similar to that of ODS.

=== Opposition ===
At the 1998 election the Freedom Union won 8.6% of the vote and 19 seats in the Chamber of Deputies. Refusing to form a government with ODS led by Václav Klaus, or with the Social Democratic Party due to policy differences, the party went into opposition. Instead the Social Democrats formed a minority government, which was tolerated by ODS.

In September 1998, the Freedom Union formed an alliance called the "Four-Coalition" with three other centre-right parties: KDU-ČSL, the Democratic Union, and the Civic Democratic Alliance. The Four-Coalition went on to win the most seats in the November 1998 Senate election. Ruml resigned as leader in December 1999, and the following February the party elected Karel Kühnl as the new leader, with 193 votes compared to 87 for Vladimír Mlynář.

The Freedom Union performed strongly at the November 2000 Senate election, becoming the third largest party in the Senate. In late 2001, Freedom Union merged with the Democratic Union party to form the Freedom Union-Democratic Union (US-DEU). However the Four-Coalition split at the beginning of 2002, after a lack of agreement on how to manage the high level of debts held by the Civic Democratic Alliance. Freedom Union-Democratic Union instead formed an alliance with KDU-ČSL to fight the 2002 election as the "Coalition".

=== Government ===
At the 2002 election the coalition of the Freedom Union-Democratic Union and KDU-ČSL won 31 seats in the Chamber of Deputies, and subsequently became part of a coalition government led by the Czech Social Democratic Party, which had a majority of one seat. However, at the 2002 Senate election, the Freedom Union-Democratic Union was reduced to only one senator.

As a party of government, the party started losing members and support, and suffered defeat in the 2004 European Parliament elections, failing to pass the 5% threshold required to win seats. Party leader Petr Mares resigned as a result, and was succeeded by the Regional Development Minister Pavel Němec. The party won just one seat at the 2004 Senate election.

=== Decline and dissolution ===
At the 2006 election, the party received just 0.3% of the vote, and lost all its seats in the Chamber of Deputies, triggering the resignation of its leader, Pavel Němec.

The party held a final party conference on 4 December 2010, where it was decided to disband the party as of 1 January 2011.

== Policies ==
The Freedom Union-Democratic Union was a centre-right liberal party, which promoted free market policies and supported lower taxes and university tuition fees. The party was also a consistent critic of corruption.

However the party was also socially liberal, supporting the protection of the environment and minority rights. For the 2006 election, the party called for the legalisation of euthanasia, same-sex marriage and marijuana. The party was also pro-European and supported direct presidential elections.

Support for the party was mostly among younger urban voters and those with higher education.

== Election results ==
=== Chamber of deputies of the Czech Republic ===
| Year | Vote | Vote % | Seats | Place | Government |
|---|---|---|---|---|---|
| 1996 | ... | ... | 33 / 200 | 3rd | Yes |
| 1998 | 513,596 | 8.6 | 19 / 200 | 5th | No |
| 2002 | 680,671▲ | 14.27▲ | 8 / 200 | 4th | Yes |
| 2006 | 16,457▼ | 0.3▼ | 0 / 200 | 11th▼ | No |

=== Senate ===
| Election | First round | | | Second round | | | Seats |
| Election | Votes | % | Places | Votes | % | Places | Seats |
|---|---|---|---|---|---|---|---|
| 1998 | | | | | | | 1 / 27 |
| 2000 | 99,504 | 11.6 | 5th | 98,985 | 17.6 | 3rd | 8 / 27 |
| 2002 | 48,879 | 7.3 | 5th | 36,294 | 4.4 | 6th | 1 / 27 |
| 2004 | 26,431 | 3.6 | 7th | 23,922 | 5.0 | 5th | 1 / 27 |
| 2006 | 18,522 | 1.7 | 8th | 7,367 | 1.3 | 9th | 0 / 27 |
| 2008 | | | | | | | 0 / 27 |

=== Presidential ===
| Indirect Election | Candidate | First round result | | | Second round result | | | Third round result | | |
| Indirect Election | Candidate | Votes | %Votes | Result | Votes | %Votes | Result | Votes | %Votes | Result |
|---|---|---|---|---|---|---|---|---|---|---|
| 1998 | Václav Havel | 130 | 70.65 | Runner-up | 146 | 52.3 | Won | — | | |
| 2003 | Jan Sokol | 128 | 46.55 | Runner-up | 129 | 48.13 | Runner-up | 124 | 46.6 | Lost |

=== European Parliament ===
| Year | Vote | Vote % | Seats | Place |
|---|---|---|---|---|
| 2004 | 39,655 | 1.7 | 0 / 24 | 8th |

== Leaders ==
| Leader | Period |
|---|---|
| Jan Ruml | 2 February 1998 – December 1999 |
| Karel Kühnl | February 2000 – 2002 |
| Hana Marvanová | 2002 |
| Ivan Pilip (interim) | July 2002 – January 2003 |
| Petr Mares | January 2003 – July 2004 |
| Pavel Němec | July 2004 – 2006 |
| Jan Černý | June 2007 – 2011 |
