= Jan Ruml =

Czech politician

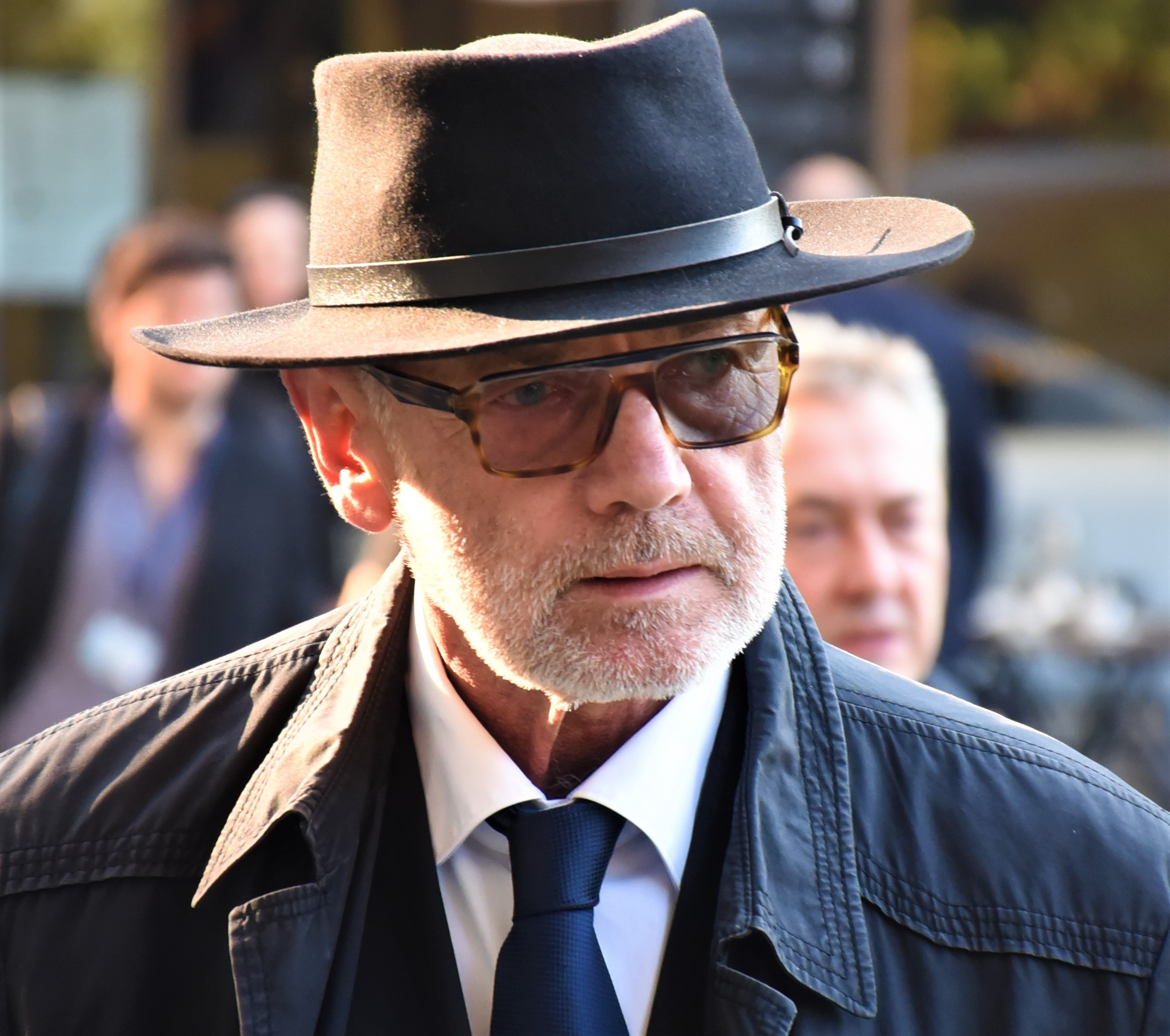
- Ruml in 2019

Minister of the Interior
- In office 2 July 1992 – 7 November 1997
- Prime Minister: Václav Klaus
- Preceded by: Tomáš Sokol
- Succeeded by: Jindřich Vodička

Senator from Prague 6
- In office 21 November 1998 – 21 November 2004
- Preceded by: Jan Koukal
- Succeeded by: Karel Schwarzenberg

Member of the Chamber of Deputies
- In office 1 June 1996 – 19 June 1998

Member of the Federal Assembly
- In office 6 June 1992 – 31 December 1992

Leader of the US–DEU
- In office 22 February 1998 – 1 December 1999
- Preceded by: Position established
- Succeeded by: Karel Kühnl

Personal details
- Born: 5 March 1953 (age 73) Prague, Czechoslovakia
- Party: OF (1989–1991); ODS (1991–1998); US–DEU (1998–2004); SZ (2010–2014)
- Education: University of West Bohemia

Jan Ruml (born 5 March 1953 in Prague) is a Czech politician who was interior minister from 1992 to 1997.

== Government career ==
Before becoming Interior Minister, Jan Ruml served as deputy Interior Minister in 1991.

Jan Ruml announced his resignation as Interior Minister on 21 October 1997. He then challenged Václav Klaus for the leadership of the Civic Democratic Party over a party funding scandal. However Klaus won with 72% of the vote at a party conference on the 14 December 1997.

== Freedom Union ==
Jan Ruml became leader of a breakaway party called Freedom Union, which was founded on the 17 January 1998. He led the party into the 1998 election, where the party won 8.6% of the vote and 19 seats and went into opposition.

Jan Ruml announced his resignation as leader of the Freedom Union on the 1 December 1999.
