= Senate district 16 – Beroun =

Electoral district in the Czech Republic

Coordinates: 49°57′23″N 14°11′10″E

16 – Beroun
- inline Senate district of the Czech Republic

- The Beroun district on a map
- Senator: Jiří Oberfalzer; Civic Democratic Party
- Region: Central Bohemian
- District: Beroun; Prague-West
- Electorate: 120662
- Area: 869.74 km²
- Last election: 2022
- Next election: 2028

Senate district 16 – Beroun is an electoral district of the Senate of the Czech Republic, centered around the city of Beroun and consisting of the whole of Beroun District and parts of the Prague-West District. Since 2004, a Civic Democratic Party member Jiří Oberfalzer is Senator for the district.

== Senators ==
Year	Senator	Party
1996 (Note: Election for shortened two-year term)	Jiří Rückl	ODA
1998	Jiří Rückl	4KOALICE
2004	Jiří Oberfalzer	ODS
2010	Jiří Oberfalzer	ODS
2016	Jiří Oberfalzer	ODS
2022	Jiří Oberfalzer	ODS

== Election results ==
=== 1996 ===
1996 Czech Senate election in Beroun
Candidate	Party	1st round		2nd round	
Candidate	Party	Votes	%	Votes	%
Jiří Rückl	ODA	7 258	19,02	14 006	50,16
Zbyněk Šorm	ODS	14 580	38,20	13 918	49,84
Petr Kučera	ČSSD	6 971	18,26	—	—
Stanislav Fischer	KSČM	5 229	13,70	—	—
Pavel Schovánek	ČSNS	1 719	4,50	—	—
Jaroslav Ortman	SDS	1 656	4,34	—	—
Jan Broj	RSZML	464	1,22	—	—
Jiří Vítkovský	PB	289	0,76	—	—

=== 1998 ===
1998 Czech Senate election in Beroun
Candidate	Party	1st round		2nd round	
Candidate	Party	Votes	%	Votes	%
Jiří Rückl	4KOALICE	16 722	37,35	15 104	62,20
Milan Knížák	ODS	13 650	30,49	9 178	37,80
Karel Kobes	ČSSD	8 378	18,72	—	—
Václav Frank	KSČM	6 016	13,44	—	—

=== 2004 ===
2004 Czech Senate election in Beroun
Candidate	Party	1st round		2nd round	
Candidate	Party	Votes	%	Votes	%
Jiří Oberfalzer	ODS	11 748	36,97	11 723	60,47
Tomáš Jedlička	KDU-ČSL	5 296	16,66	7 661	39,52
Rudolf Peltan	KSČM	4 652	14,64	—	—
Jiří Besser	"LIRA"	3 979	12,52	—	—
Lenka Šmídová	ČSSD	3 584	11,27	—	—
Martin Bezouška	NEZ	1 627	5,12	—	—
Otakar Maňas	SZR	615	1,93	—	—
Dušan Kučera	NS	274	0,86	—	—

=== 2010 ===
2010 Czech Senate election in Beroun
Candidate	Party	1st round		2nd round	
Candidate	Party	Votes	%	Votes	%
Jiří Oberfalzer	ODS	17 303	33,43	10 734	51,87
Věra Kovářová	TOP 09, STAN	16 165	31,23	9 957	48,12
Pavel Kysela	ČSSD	10 892	21,04	—	—
Rudolf Peltan	KSČM	4 954	9,57	—	—
Marcel Winter	Suverenita	1 240	2,39	—	—
Tom Jack Illés	SPOZ	1 195	2,30	—	—

=== 2016 ===
2016 Czech Senate election in Beroun
Candidate	Party	1st round		2nd round	
Candidate	Party	Votes	%	Votes	%
Jiří Oberfalzer	ODS	9 013	23,69	11 079	63,14
Bohumil Stibal	ANO 2011	6 385	16,78	6 465	36,85
Jan Holásek	KDU-ČSL, SZ, NK	6 152	16,17	—	—
Tomáš Trč	TOP 09, STAN	5 503	14,46	—	—
Jiří Peřina	ČSSD	4 613	12,12	—	—
Miroslav Matyáš	KSČM	2 936	7,71	—	—
Petr Hampl	APAČI 2017	2 705	7,11	—	—
Jiří Hroník	HOZK	730	1,91	—	—

=== 2022 ===
2022 Czech Senate election in Beroun
Candidate	Party	1st round		2nd round	
Candidate	Party	Votes	%	Votes	%
Jiří Oberfalzer	ODS, KDU-ČSL, TOP 09	18 823	37,89	11 297	55,08
Janis Sidovský	SEN 21, LES	14 861	29,92	9 211	44,91
Michal Auředník	NEZ	10 495	21,13	—	—
Martin Karim	Pirates	5 487	11,04	—	—
