= Senate district 14 – České Budějovice =

Electoral district in the Czech Republic

Coordinates: 49°02′18″N 14°38′36″E

14 – České Budějovice
- inline Senate district of the Czech Republic

- The České Budějovice district on a map
- Senator: Zbyněk Sýkora; ODS
- Region: South Bohemian
- District: České Budějovice; Jindřichův Hradec
- Electorate: 113886
- Area: 808.88 km²
- Last election: 2024
- Next election: 2030

Senate district 14 – České Budějovice is an electoral district of the Senate of the Czech Republic, which is composed of the parts of the České Budějovice and Jindřichův Hradec districts. From 2024 onwards, Zbyněk Sýkora from ODS is representing the district.

== Senators ==
Year	Senator	Party
1996 (Note: Election for shortened four-year term)	Jiří Pospíšil	ODS
2000	Jiří Pospíšil	ODS
2006	Jiří Pospíšil	ODS
2012	Jiří Šesták	STAN
2018	Ladislav Faktor	Independent
2024	Zbyněk Sýkora	ODS

== Election results ==
=== 1996 ===
1996 Czech Senate election in České Budějovice
Candidate	Party	1st round		2nd round	
Candidate	Party	Votes	%	Votes	%
Jiří Pospíšil	ODS	15 728	40,40	22 147	56,11
Vladimír Papež	ČSSD	7 718	19,83	17 322	43,89
Radoslav Beránek	ODA	4 987	12,81	—	—
Miroslav Tetter	KDU-ČSL	4 762	12,23	—	—
Miluše Joanidisová	KSČM	4 728	12,15	—	—
František Kubát	NEI	824	2,12	—	—
Jan Komenda	SDL	181	0,46	—	—

=== 2000 ===
2000 Czech Senate election in České Budějovice
Candidate	Party	1st round		2nd round	
Candidate	Party	Votes	%	Votes	%
Jiří Pospíšil	ODS	10 547	28,43	10 290	51,86
Petr Petr	4KOALICE	10 388	28,00	9 549	48,13
Petr Braný	KSČM	6 057	16,33	—	—
Vladimír Papež	ČSSD	5 503	14,83	—	—
Hana Urbancová	VPM	2 888	7,78	—	—
Jaroslav Pavlíček	PB	855	2,30	—	—
Jiří Šumský	SZ	850	2,29	—	—

=== 2006 ===
2006 Czech Senate election in České Budějovice
Candidate	Party	1st round		2nd round	
Candidate	Party	Votes	%	Votes	%
Jiří Pospíšil	ODS	15 162	36,55	12 839	63,35
Miroslav Tetter	KDU-ČSL	6 005	14,47	7 425	36,64
Lumír Mraček	SNK ED	5 977	14,40	—	—
Eduard Zeman	ČSSD	5 488	13,22	—	—
Ivan Tekel	KSČM	3 959	9,54	—	—
Miroslav Hule	SZ	2 964	7,14	—	—
Elvíra Tomášková	KONS	1 135	2,73	—	—
Miroslav Kříženecký	„21“	792	1,90	—	—

=== 2012 ===
2012 Czech Senate election in České Budějovice
Candidate	Party	1st round		2nd round	
Candidate	Party	Votes	%	Votes	%
Jiří Šesták	STAN, „HOPB“	9 412	22,91	11 495	54,99
Jan Zahradník	ODS	12 357	30,08	9 408	45,0
Ivana Stráská	ČSSD	7 158	17,42	—	—
Alena Nohavová	KSČM	6 226	15,15	—	—
Jaromír Talíř	KDU-ČSL	2 956	7,19	—	—
Marie Paukejová	SBB	1 188	2,89	—	—
Miroslav Holler	KSČ	945	2,3	—	—
Jindřich Goetz	SPOZ	831	2,02	—	—

=== 2018 ===
2018 Czech Senate election in České Budějovice
Candidate	Party	1st round		2nd round	
Candidate	Party	Votes	%	Votes	%
Ladislav Faktor	Independent	9 142	21,49	9 408	52,59
Jiří Šesták	STAN, „HOPB“	9 136	21,47	8 478	47,40
Richard Schötz	KSČM	6 777	15,93	—	—
Lubomír Pána	SPD	6 233	14,65	—	—
Štěpán Tampír	Svobodní	5 198	12,21	—	—
Blanka Sýkorová Jakubcová	PRO Zdraví	2 975	6,99	—	—
Miloslav Procházka	ČSSD	2 509	5,89	—	—
Marie Paukejová	ČSNS	567	1,33	—	—

=== 2024 ===
2024 Czech Senate election in České Budějovice
Candidate	Party	1st round		2nd round	
Candidate	Party	Votes	%	Votes	%
Zbyněk Sýkora	ODS	15 145	39,84	11 898	68,23
Ladislav Ondřich	ANO 2011	8 318	21,88	5 539	31,76
Juraj Thoma	STAN, „HOPB“	7 912	20,81	—	—
Vojtěch Filip	KSČM	3 740	9,83	—	—
Jan Tkaczik	SPD, Tricolour	2 415	6,35	—	—
Václav Kupilík	ND	484	1,27	—	—
