= Medek =

Medek (feminine Medková) is a Czech surname. Notable people include:

- Emila Medková, Czech photographer
- Ivan Medek, Czech classical music critic
- Mikuláš Medek, Czech painter
- Rudolf Medek, Czech poet
- Tilo Medek, German composer
