= Miroslav Sládek =

Czech politician

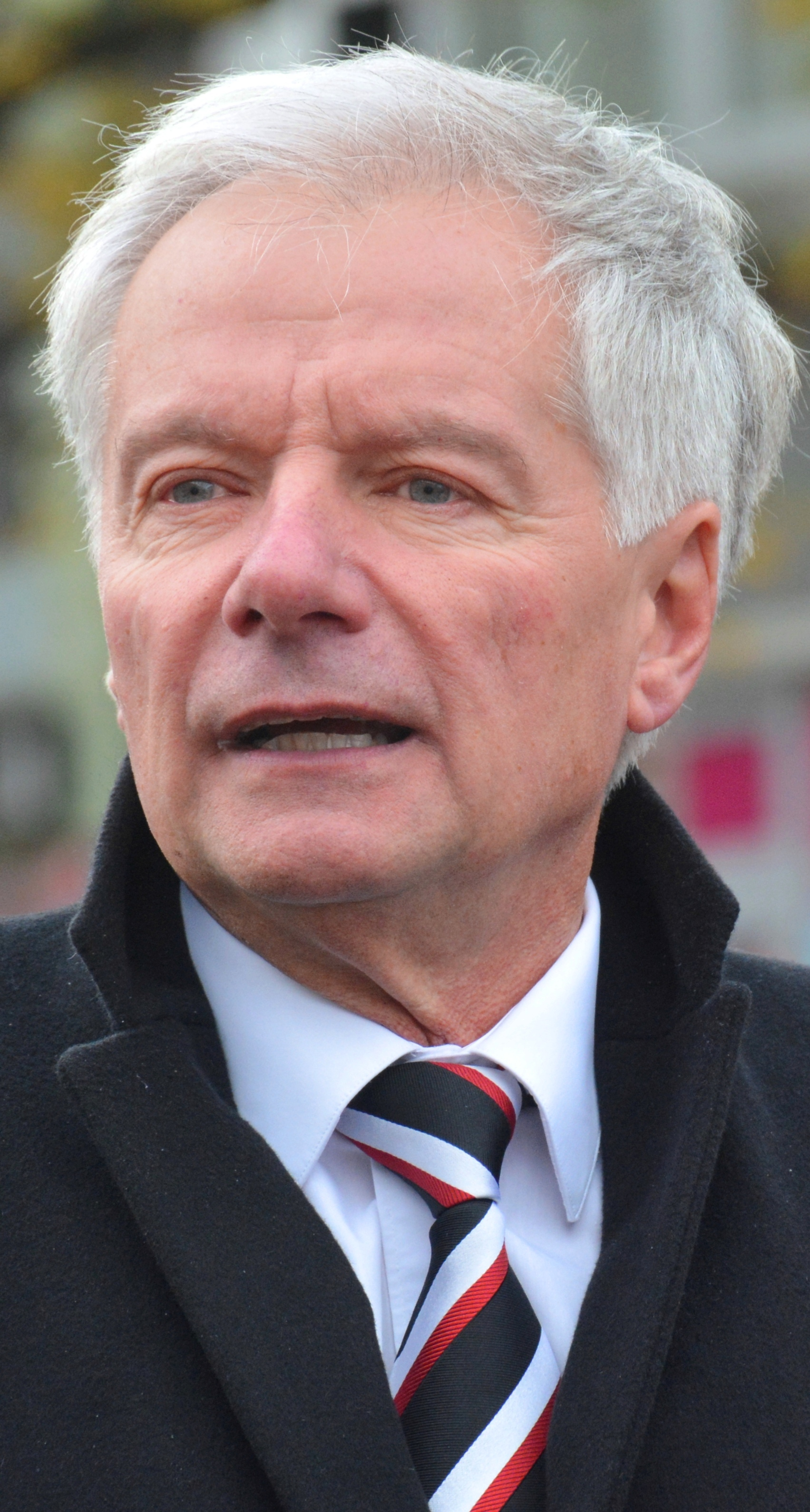
- Sládek in 2017

Leader of the Republican Party of Czechoslovakia (2016)
- In office 18 June 2016 – 12 February 2026
- Preceded by: Position re-established
- Succeeded by: Position abolished

Leader of the Republican Party of Czechoslovakia (1990)
- In office 24 February 1990 – 16 February 2001
- Preceded by: Position established
- Succeeded by: Position abolished

Member of the Chamber of Deputies
- In office 1 June 1996 – 19 June 1998

Member of the Federal Assembly
- In office 1 June 1992 – 31 December 1992

Mayor of Brno-Útěchov
- In office May 2003 – May 2004
- Preceded by: Jaromír Sáňka
- Succeeded by: Zdeněk Drahoš

Personal details
- Born: 24 October 1950 (age 75) Hradec Králové, Czechoslovakia (now Czech Republic)
- Party: Rally for the Republic – Republican Party of Czechoslovakia (1990-2001) (2016-2026)
- Spouse: Laura Sládková
- Education: Charles University

Miroslav Sládek (24 October 1950 in Hradec Králové) is a Czech politician, and the founder and chairman of the right-wing populist Rally for the Republic – Republican Party of Czechoslovakia (SPR-RSČ). Founded in 1990, the party was disbanded in 2001, re-established in 2016 and disbanded again in 2026.

== Early years ==
Sládek grew up in the town Kostelec nad Orlicí. He studied at Charles University in Prague, specializing in information and library systems. Before the fall of Communism in 1989 he worked at the Czech Office for Press and Information.

== Political career ==
=== Founding of SPR-RSČ ===
In 1990 Sládek founded a new political party, Rally for the Republic – Republican Party of Czechoslovakia (Czech: Sdružení pro republiku - Republikánska strana Československa; SPR-RSČ). The name referred to the pre-World War II Agrarian Party, officially named the Republican Party. Sládek became party chairman in 1990 (and was elected again in 1991, 1992, 1994 and 1998).

Sládek was the most prominent and active member of the party, visiting several towns or villages each day to make political speeches. A poster with his photo was printed in large quantities and used as election campaign material in several successive election. Sládek was the principle decision maker within the party, decided party policy, and expelled any members who were insufficiently loyal.

SPR-RSČ was a populist protest party. Their policy programme focused on issues such as corruption during voucher privatisation and crime among Roma communities, and promised to solve them with an "iron fist". The party's rhetoric used resentment and fear of the Sudeten Germans expelled from Czechoslovakia in 1945, and positioned the party as the only protector of the nation. Other policies included halting immigration, support for the death penalty, and opposition to the European Union.

In the 1992 parliamentary election the party won several seats; in June 1992 Sládek became a member of the Federal Assembly of Czechoslovakia, until it was dissolved at the end of 1992 when Czechoslovakia split into two.

=== Election success ===
In the 1996 legislative election SPR-RSČ obtained 8% of the vote, winning 18 seats in the Chamber of Deputies. However, the party was marginalised by other parties and unable to implement its policies, turning instead to the obstruction of the legislative process. The party received negative coverage in the Czech media, and the authoritarian leadership of Sládek and several scandals led many members and MPs to leave the party.

=== Presidential candidacy ===
Sládek was a candidate in the indirect elections for president in 1992, 1993 and 1998, receiving a marginal number of votes. A few days before the 1998 election Sládek was arrested and was in prison during the voting; his missing vote enabled the re-election of Václav Havel, who obtained exactly the necessary number of votes.

=== Decline and dissolution ===
The internal problems of the party and the populist campaign of Miloš Zeman, leader of the Social Democrats, led to a loss of support for SPR-RSČ, and in the 1998 legislative elections the party received 3.9% of votes and no parliament seats. The decline of the party accelerated and in 2001 it was forcefully dissolved due to financial irregularities. Sládek established a successor party Republikáni Miroslava Sládka (The Republicans of Miroslav Sládek) but failed to attract a significant number of voters.

=== Post-dissolution ===
In 2002 Sládek was elected to the municipal government of Útěchov, a district of Brno. After a political struggle with the incumbent mayor Sládek took over the position, until 2004.

In 2006 he was sentenced to a fine because of the debt accumulated by SPR-RSČ, and was forbidden to run for the leadership of any political party for three years. During this time he was still planning to return to politics. In one interview Sládek expressed the view that while he had personally failed, the whole political scene had nonetheless become "Sládek-like" in the meantime.

In the 2025 Czech parliamentary election he was on the candidate list of Czech Republic in First Place! in the Moravian-Silesian Region.

== Publications ==
From 1990 to 1995 Sládek was editor-in-chief of the party weekly Republika. Editors of the weekly were charged several times with attempting to incite violence and hatred. Between 1992 and 1998 Sládek published collections of his speeches in five books.

== Personal life ==
Sládek is a Roman Catholic. He is married to Laura Sládková, who was also involved in leadership positions in the Coalition for Republic – Republican Party of Czechoslovakia.
