= Jiří Pospíšil (disambiguation) =

Jiří Pospíšil (born 1975) is a Czech politician.

Jiří Pospíšil may also refer to:

- Jiří Pospíšil (politician, born 1949) (1949–2024), Czech psychologist and politician
- Jiří Pospíšil (basketball) (1950–2019), Czech basketball player
- Jiří Pospíšil (cyclist) (born 1973), Czech cyclo-cross cyclist
