= 1993 Czech presidential election =

- 26 January 1993
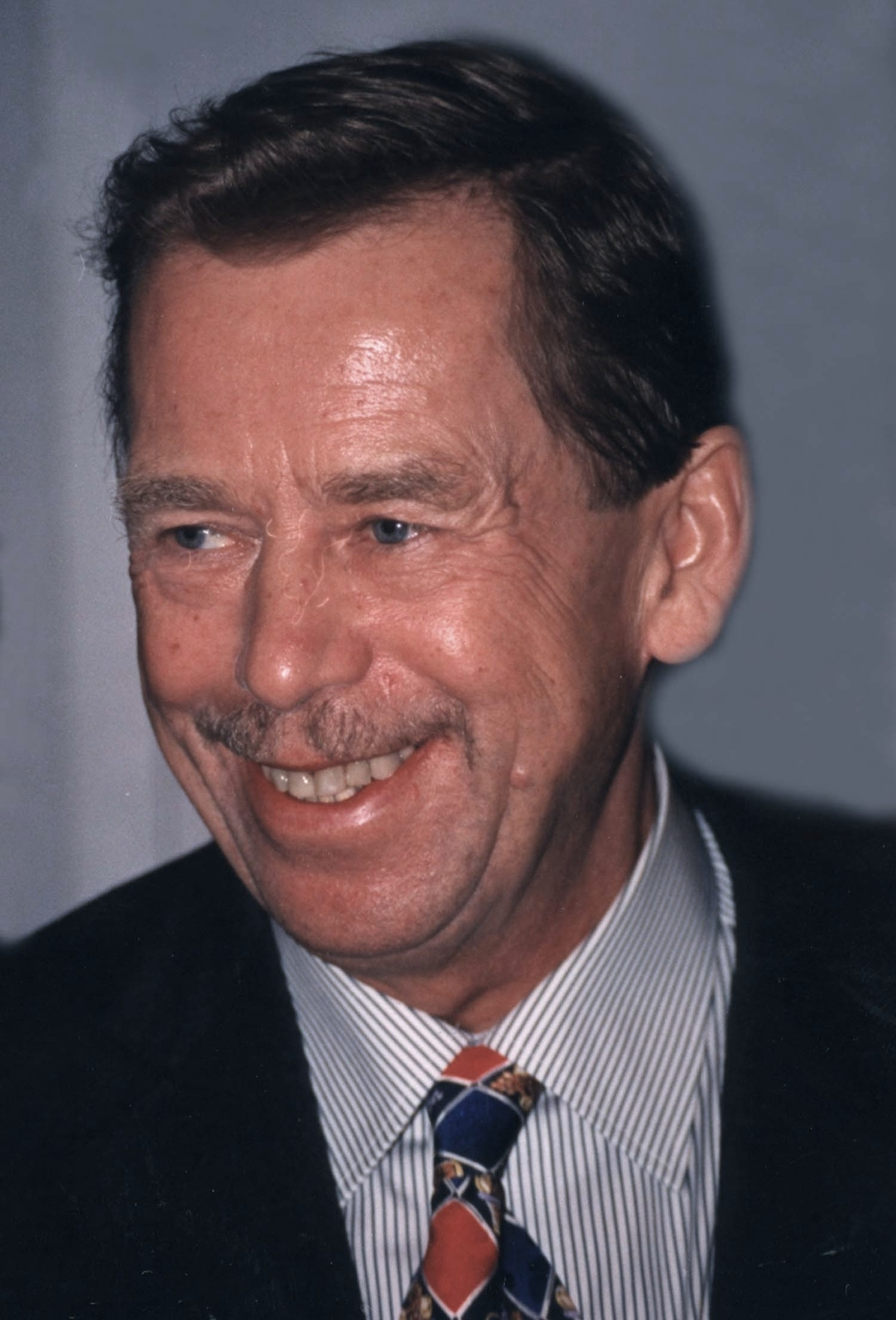

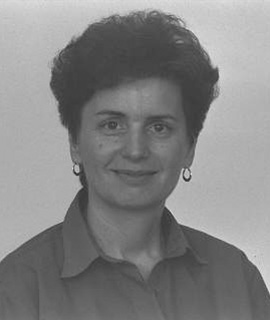

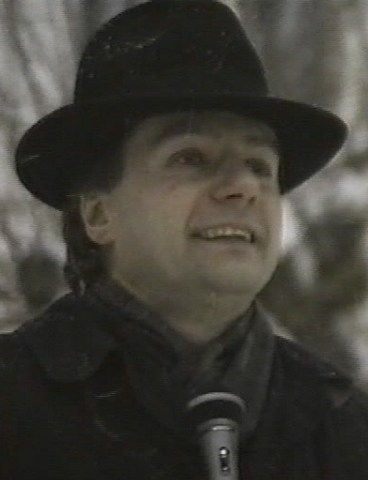
Nominee	Václav Havel	Marie Stiborová	Miroslav Sládek
Party	Independent	KSČM	SPR–RSČ
Electoral vote	109	49	14
Percentage	54.5%	24.5%	7.0%
Elected President
Václav Havel
Independent

Indirect presidential elections were held in the Czech Republic on 26 January 1993 to elect the first president of the newly independent country. The president was elected by the members of the Czech Republic Parliament, with Václav Havel emerging as the winner. The election was complicated only by attacks of Republicans against Havel and by bomb threat to the Parliament.

== Candidates ==
- Václav Havel – former president of Czechoslovakia and a candidate of governing coalition (ODS, KDU–ČSL and ODA).
- Marie Stiborová – leader of the Left Bloc (coalition of parties KSČM and SDL).
- Miroslav Sládek – leader of SPR–RSČ.

== Opinion polls ==
Date	Agency	Václav Havel	Miroslav Sládek	Someone else	Undecided	None
November 1992	IVVM	25.7	1.6	38.4	25.8	8.5
Source: Nesstar

== Parties in parliament ==
Party	Chamber of Deputies	Endorsed candidate
Civic Democratic Party (ODS)	66 / 200	Václav Havel
Communist Party of Bohemia and Moravia (KSČM)	33 / 200	Marie Stiborová
Czech Social Democratic Party (ČSSD)	16 / 200	
Christian and Democratic Union – Czechoslovak People's Party (KDU–ČSL)	15 / 200	Václav Havel
Rally for the Republic – Republican Party of Czechoslovakia (SPR–RSČ)	14 / 200	Miroslav Sládek
Civic Democratic Alliance (ODA)	14 / 200	Václav Havel
Movement for Autonomous Democracy–Party for Moravia and Silesia (HSD–SMS)	14 / 200	
Christian Democratic Party (KDS)	10 / 200	Václav Havel
Agrarian Party (ZS)	8 / 200	
Czechoslovak Socialist Party (ČSS)	5 / 200	
Green Party (SZ)	3 / 200	
Party of the Democratic Left (SDL)	2 / 200	Marie Stiborová

== Results ==
All 200 Members of Parliament voted. Six of them submitted invalid ballots while 22 submitted empty ballots. Havel received 109 votes and thus won the election in the first round. Communist candidate Stiborová received only 49 votes and Republican candidate Sládek only 14 votes. This is the only presidential election in which the president was voted and elected only by Chamber of Deputies. Havel received 109 votes. It was expected that Havel will receive much more votes because governing coalition had 105 votes and part of opposition promised support to Havel. It is very likely that he didn't receive some votes from Civic Democrats and Christian Democrats (from KDS). Havel was inaugurated on 2 February 1993 and became the first president of the Czech Republic.

Candidate	Votes	%
Václav Havel	109	63.37
Marie Stiborová	49	28.49
Miroslav Sládek	14	8.14
Total	172	100.00
Valid votes	172	86.00
Invalid votes	6	3.00
Blank votes	22	11.00
Total votes	200	100.00
