= 2002 Czech parliamentary election =

- 14–15 June 2002

All 200 seats in the Chamber of Deputies 101 seats needed for a majority
- Turnout: 57.95% (▼16.13pp)
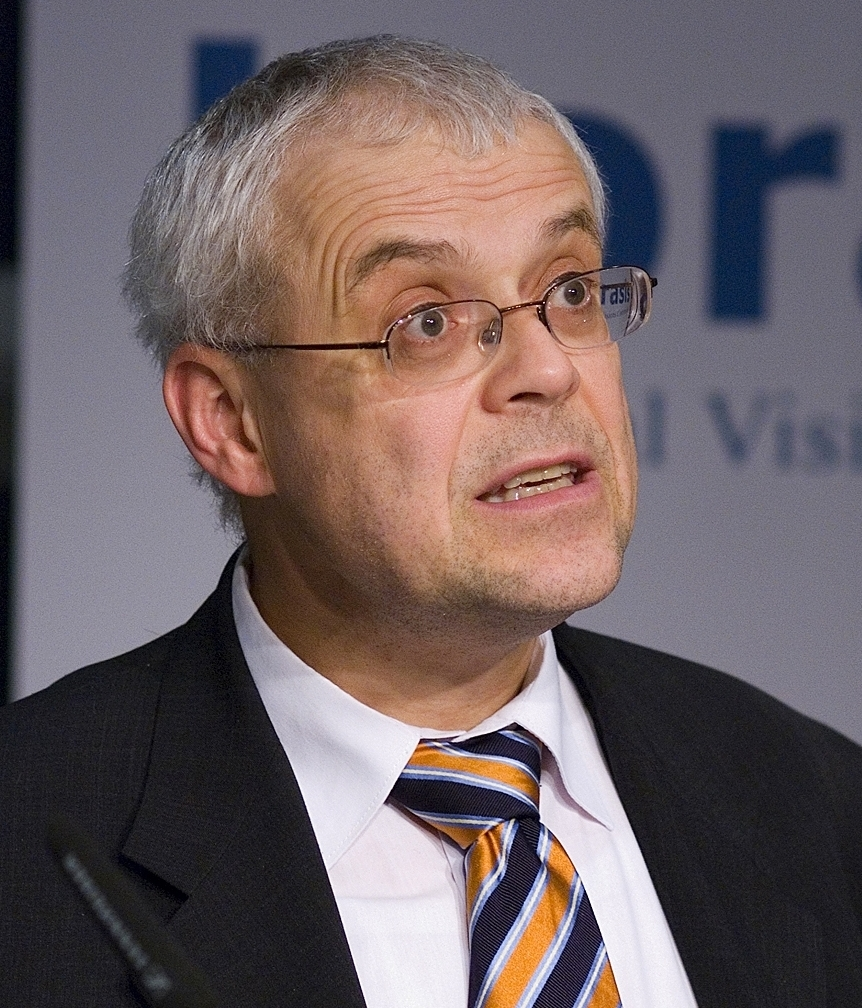

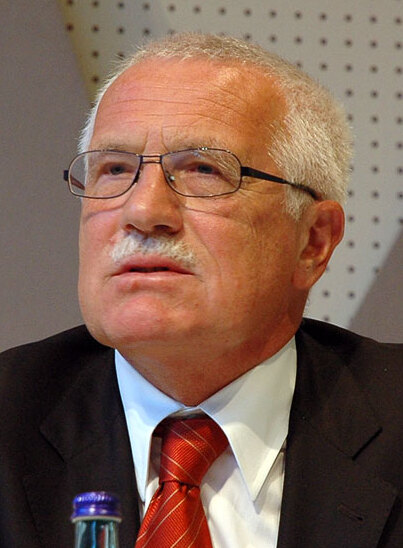

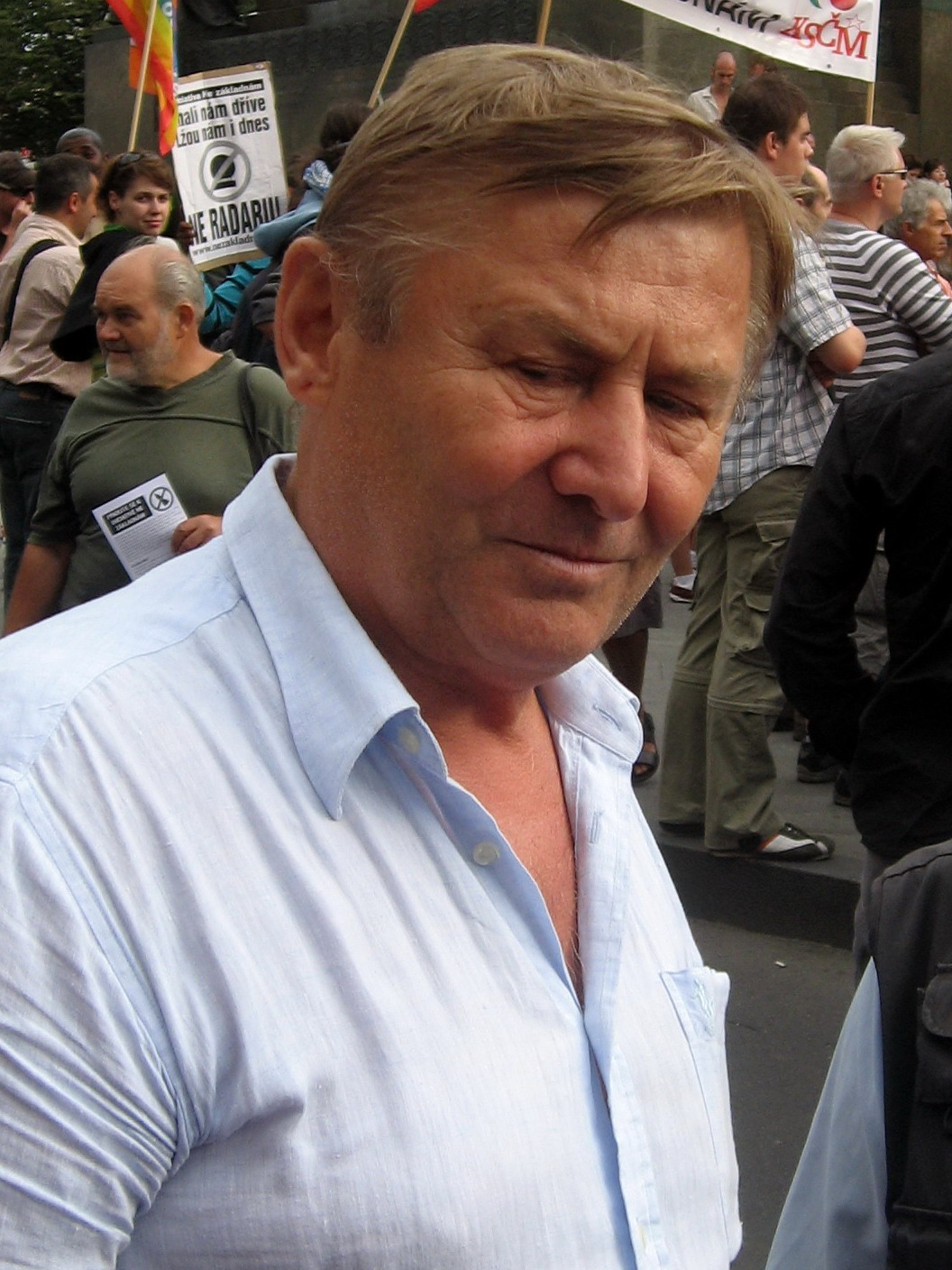

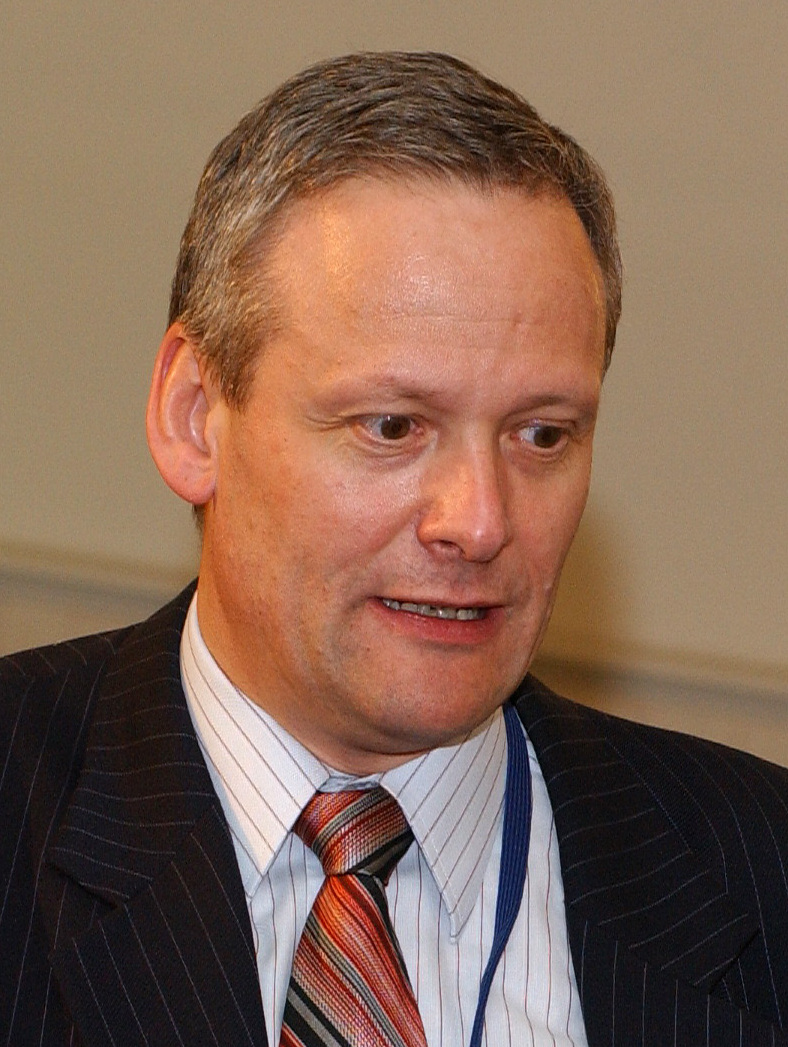
| | First party | Second party |
|---|---|---|
| Leader | Vladimír Špidla | Václav Klaus |
| Party | ČSSD | ODS |
| Last election | 32.31%, 74 seats | 27.74%, 63 seats |
| Seats won | 70 | 58 |
| Seat change | ▼4 | ▼5 |
| Popular vote | 1,440,279 | 1,166,975 |
| Percentage | 30.21% | 24.48% |
| Swing | ▼2.10pp | ▼3.26pp |
| | Third party | Fourth party |
| Leader | Miroslav Grebeníček | Cyril Svoboda |
| Party | KSČM | KDU-ČSL |
| Alliance | | Four-Coalition |
| Last election | 11.03%, 24 seats | 17.59%, 39 seats |
| Seats won | 41 | 31 |
| Seat change | ▲17 | ▼8 |
| Popular vote | 882,653 | 680,670 |
| Percentage | 18.51% | 14.28% |
| Swing | ▲7.48pp | ▼3.31pp |
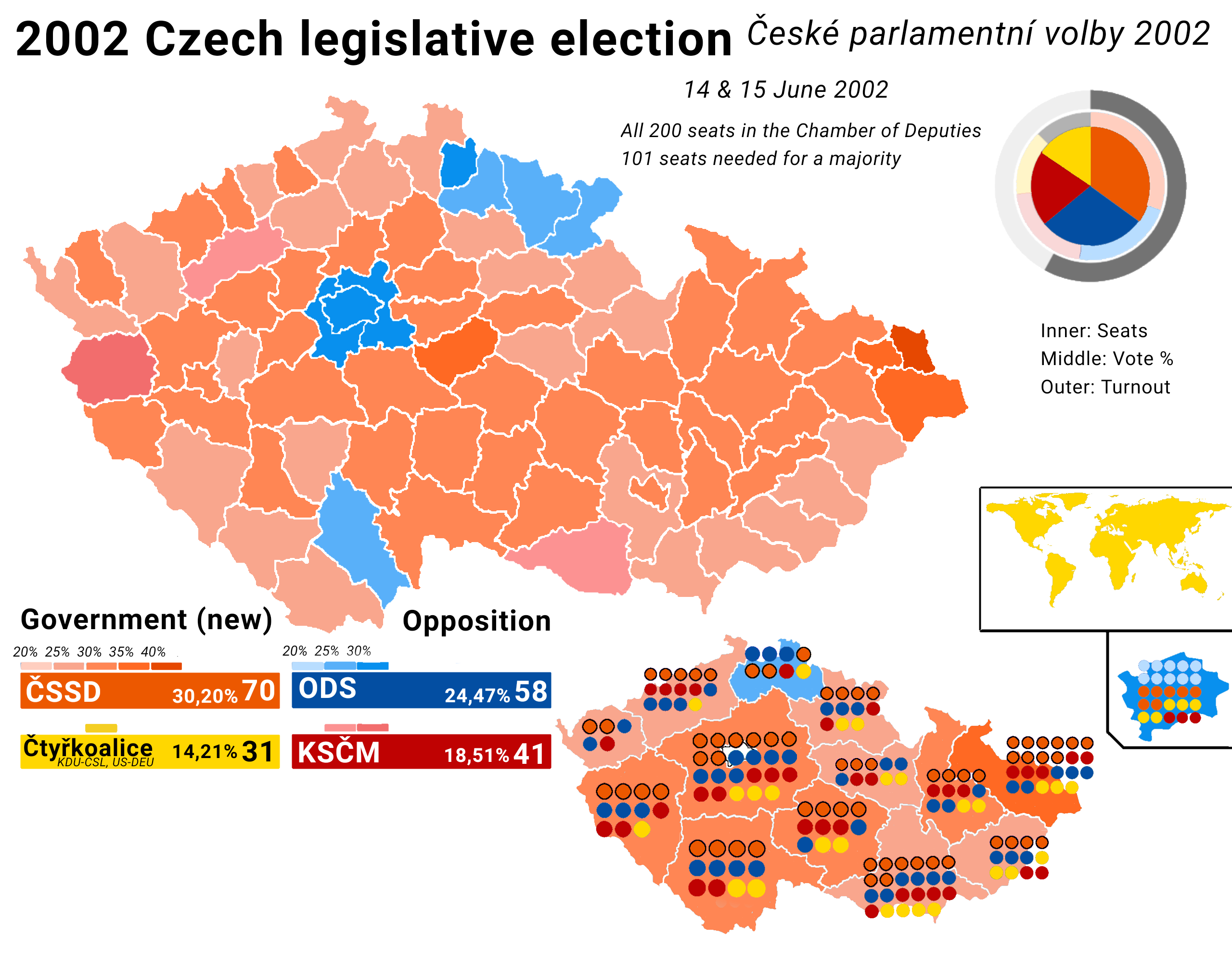
Prime Minister before election
Miloš Zeman
ČSSD
Prime Minister after election
Vladimír Špidla
ČSSD

Parliamentary elections were held in the Czech Republic on 14 and 15 June 2002. The Czech Social Democratic Party (ČSSD) emerged as the leading party, winning 71 out of 200 seats in the Chamber of Deputies. The Civic Democratic Party (ODS) followed with 56 seats. Compared to the 74% voter turnout in 1998, participation dropped to 58% in 2002. The Communist Party achieved its strongest result since the Velvet Revolution, securing third place with 19% of the seats, while the Christian Democratic Union–Freedom Union alliance ranked fourth with 14%.

== Background ==
The political landscape of the Czech Republic between 1998 and 2002 was significantly shaped by the so-called "Opposition Agreement" (Opposiční smlouva), a controversial power-sharing pact between the Czech Social Democratic Party (ČSSD) and the Civic Democratic Party (ODS). Following the 1998 elections the ČSSD formed a minority government with the tacit parliamentary support of ODS, which abstained from no-confidence votes in exchange for influence over constitutional and legislative matters.

This arrangement faced public criticism and declining trust in mainstream parties, as it blurred traditional party divisions and was widely perceived as a self-serving elite bargain. Disillusionment with the political establishment contributed to a decline in voter turnout, which fell from 74% in 1998 to 58% in 2002.

Economically, the Czech Republic witnessed moderate growth and increased foreign investment in the early 2000s, partially due to macroeconomic stabilization and the anticipation of European Union accession. Key political debates included pension reform, healthcare funding, privatization of state enterprises, and the pace of EU integration. The accession process was a defining feature of the campaign, with ČSSD strongly supporting integration, while ODS maintained a more cautious, sovereignty-focused stance.

== Electoral system ==
The elections were held using a proportional representation system with party lists. The country was divided into 14 constituencies, with seats allocated using the d'Hondt method, and a 5% electoral threshold, which slightly favored larger parties.

In 2001 the Constitutional Court had agreed to a provision of increasing the threshold for coalitions to enter parliament. Keeping the 2002 elections in mind, the ČSSD took the first step to suggest new electoral regulations. This new electoral regulation aimed to modify the number of electoral districts in accordance with the number of regions (14) that were put forth in the previous years, while the structure of seat distribution was determined by the d’Hondt structure. Even though there was minor opposition from certain groups of senators and deputies against the rising threshold of alliance-based parties to join the parliament, both houses of the parliament were in favour of this law and approved of it in January 2002.

The reforms restricted the representation of smaller parties by introducing a higher threshold. This prompted parties to negotiate a compromise that complied with the Constitutional Court ruling while addressing internal power dynamics. So that it does not work against the law passed by the Constitutional Court, and nor does it clash with the changes occurring in the Senate, wherein the CSSD and ODS did not stand to win the majority votes. It was after all of these steps that the new electoral system was implemented in 2002. However, the reform did not fully meet the intended goals set by party leaders regarding systemic stability and representation.

The new electoral reform was expected to produce benefits for larger parties, while putting the smaller parties at the risk of lack of proper representation. But, there were specific conditions under which this disproportionate representation of smaller parties was possible. That is because in 2002, all the election-contesting parties had almost equal representation, as all of them were large in size, and the Coalition that was the smallest in size was able to secure 14% of seats. But, in the same year, the voter only had two preferential votes available to him, when previously it was four.

== Campaign ==
The election campaigns were marked by an emphasis on television debates and media visibility. ČSSD presented Vladimír Špidla as a moderate and consensus-oriented leader, contrasting him with the more assertive style of ODS figures. Campaign messaging focused on social welfare, EU integration, and government transparency. According to a report by the European Journalism Centre, mainstream media remained officially neutral, but some editorial biases were noted, especially in tabloid coverage of the Communist Party’s rebranding. Political advertising on TV and in print media saw a rise in expenditure compared to 1998, indicating the growing role of mass media in Czech elections.

The ODS had been considered as a straightforward party owing to its open support for joining the EU. But it was the party's agenda of protecting the national interests of the country and its people, which they used as a topic of their party election campaign.

The Communist Party of Bohemia and Moravia (KSČM) opted to change the branding of the party, by adding new faces to the parliament, as a way of attracting the attention of potential voters; the percentage of new members was 61% in 2002, which is way higher than that in 1998, which was 16.7%.

=== Finances ===
CSSD and ODS were the only two parties that reported notable increases in revenue across multiple election years. Their strong electoral performance allowed them to receive generous government subsidies. In addition to public funding, both parties also generated income from private donations, membership fees, and revenue from their own economic activities such as property holdings and affiliated enterprises. These diversified income streams contributed to their financial stability and campaign capabilities.

From 2002 onward, both parties experienced noticeable increases in revenue. Notably, CSSD saw a significant spike in income in 2001—a non-election year—which was largely attributed to the relocation of its party headquarters, likely tied to asset restructuring and increased internal fundraising efforts.

| Party | ČSSD | 4K | ODS | KSČM | SNK | Green Party |
|---|---|---|---|---|---|---|
| Money Spent | 75,000,000 Kč | 72,000,000 Kč | 60,000,000 Kč | 10,500,000 Kč | 10,000,000 Kč | 2,500,000 Kč |

== Opinion polls ==
| Date | Polling Firm | ČSSD | ODS | 4K | KSČM | Others |
| 14-15 Jun 2002 | Election | 30.2 | 24.5 | 14.3 | 18.5 | 12.5 |
|---|---|---|---|---|---|---|
| 5 - 12 Jun 2002 | CVVM | 29.0 | 27.0 | 13.5 | 17.5 | 13.0 |
| 6 Jun 2002 | TNS Factum | 29.4 | 27.8 | 13.1 | 18.4 | 11.3 |
| 20–27 May 2002 | CVVM | 21.5 | 19.5 | 11.5 | 10.0 | 37.5 |
| 22 - 29 Apr 2002 | CVVM | 24.0 | 22.0 | 12.5 | 14.5 | 27.0 |
| 17 Apr 2002 | TNS Factum | 24.1 | 28.2 | 19.6 | 17.5 | 10.6 |
| 4 Apr 2002 | STEM | 23.7 | 26.4 | 17.0 | 14.1 | 18.8 |
| 22 Mar - 2 Apr 2002 | CVVM | 22.0 | 20.0 | 17.0 | 14.0 | 27.0 |
| 8 Mar 2002 | TNS Factum | 25.0 | 30.5 | 17.0 | 16.2 | 11.3 |
| 4 Mar 2002 | STEM | 26.4 | 23.7 | 16.9 | 14.1 | 18.9 |
| 15 Feb 2002 | CVVM | 23.0 | 18.5 | 23.0 | 13.5 | 22.0 |
| 15 Feb 2002 | STEM | 23.8 | 23.0 | 19.1 | 13.4 | 20.7 |
| 24 Jan 2002 | STEM | 21.5 | 21.3 | 22.5 | 15.6 | 19.1 |
| 7 Jan 2002 | CVVM | 24.0 | 18.0 | 20.0 | 10.0 | 28.0 |

== Conduct ==
Ahead of the elections, amendments were introduced to improve electoral transparency and media access. Provisions also addressed campaign financing regulations, aligning the framework with European Union standards ahead of planned accession in 2004.

The elections were monitored by the Organization for Security and Co-operation in Europe (OSCE), which concluded that the process met international democratic standards. Minor concerns were noted regarding campaign finance oversight and legal dispute resolution, but the overall administration was considered efficient and peaceful.

== Results ==
Voter turnout dropped to 58%, compared to 74% in the 1998 elections. Analysts linked the decline to growing disillusionment with coalition politics and the blurred ideological lines between major parties. The termination of the "Opposition Agreement" between ČSSD and ODS was seen by voters as an attempt to restore political distinction. The elections also witnessed increased support for the Communist Party, reflecting dissatisfaction among sections of the electorate.

The elections led to a slight increase in female and young deputies in the Chamber. Women held 17% of parliamentary seats, up from 15% in 1996. The parties also introduced more candidates under 35, signaling generational change in Czech politics. The Communist Party (KSČM) notably revamped its image with 61% of its elected MPs being newcomers. Despite some progress, gender parity and youth participation remained limited at senior levels.

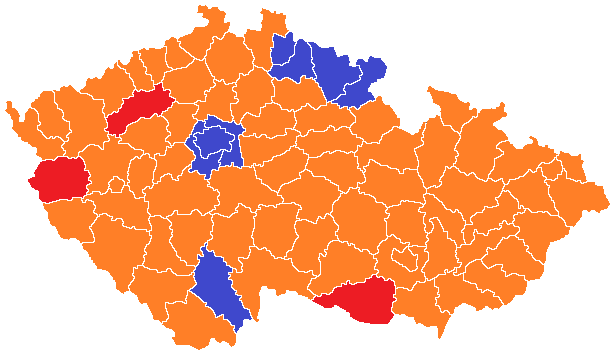
Districts won by respective parties

| Party | Votes | % | Seats | +/– |
|---|---|---|---|---|
| Czech Social Democratic Party | 1,440,279 | 30.21 | 70 | –4 |
| Civic Democratic Party | 1,166,975 | 24.48 | 58 | –5 |
| Communist Party of Bohemia and Moravia | 882,653 | 18.51 | 41 | +17 |
| Four-Coalition (KDU-ČSL, US–DEU) | 680,671 | 14.28 | 31 | -8 |
| Union of Independents | 132,699 | 2.78 | 0 | New |
| Green Party | 112,929 | 2.37 | 0 | 0 |
| Republicans of Miroslav Sládek | 46,325 | 0.97 | 0 | New |
| Rural Party | 41,773 | 0.88 | 0 | New |
| Party for Life Security | 41,404 | 0.87 | 0 | New |
| Czech National Social Party | 38,655 | 0.81 | 0 | 0 |
| Hope | 29,955 | 0.63 | 0 | New |
| Right Bloc | 28,163 | 0.59 | 0 | New |
| Civic Democratic Alliance | 24,278 | 0.51 | 0 | New |
| Choice for the Future | 16,730 | 0.35 | 0 | New |
| Path of Change | 13,169 | 0.28 | 0 | New |
| Moravian Democratic Party | 12,957 | 0.27 | 0 | 0 |
| Party of Common Sense | 10,849 | 0.23 | 0 | New |
| Akce za zrus.Senatu a proti t. | 9,637 | 0.20 | 0 | New |
| Balbín's Poetic Party | 9,287 | 0.19 | 0 | New |
| Humanist Alliance | 8,461 | 0.18 | 0 | New |
| Republicans | 6,786 | 0.14 | 0 | New |
| National Democratic Party | 5,532 | 0.12 | 0 | New |
| Democratic League | 4,059 | 0.09 | 0 | New |
| Czech Right | 2,041 | 0.04 | 0 | New |
| Czech Social Democratic Movement | 602 | 0.01 | 0 | New |
| Roma Civic Initiative | 523 | 0.01 | 0 | New |
| Party of Democratic Socialism | 475 | 0.01 | 0 | New |
| New Movement | 139 | 0.00 | 0 | New |
| Total | 4,768,006 | 100.00 | 200 | 0 |
| Valid votes | 4,768,006 | 99.56 | | |
| Invalid/blank votes | 21,139 | 0.44 | | |
| Total votes | 4,789,145 | 100.00 | | |
| Registered voters/turnout | 8,264,484 | 57.95 | | |
Source: Nohlen & Stöver, Volby

=== Vote share by district ===
ODS

CSSD

KSCM

KDU CSL

== Analysis ==
There was a significant improvement in the socio-economic situation of the country, which people associatied with the CSSD and its 2002 campaigning effects. Vladmir Spidla, the successor of Social Democratic leader Milos Zeman, was completely against the ‘Opposition Agreement’ that was signed between them and the Civic Democratic Party (ODS), a move that analysts suggest may have contributed to increased public support for the CSSD during the 2002 campaign. The ‘Opposition Agreement’ was a cooperative policy between the two majority parties, under which they were obligated to work together in tasks such as taking political decisions, attending control groups and advisory boards, and implementing an electoral law that would work to benefit both the parties, which the CSSD had to break away from to function as the majority party after the victory in 2002.

== Aftermath ==
Following the 2002 parliamentary elections, the Czech Social Democratic Party (ČSSD) formed a coalition government with the Christian and Democratic Union – Czechoslovak People's Party (KDU-ČSL) and the Freedom Union – Democratic Union (US-DEU). The coalition held 101 out of 200 seats, giving it a narrow majority in the Chamber of Deputies. President Václav Havel officially tasked Vladimír Špidla with forming the new government, and the administration was sworn in on 15 July 2002. The coalition agreement prioritized EU accession, fiscal reform, and social welfare policies. Despite ideological differences, the coalition maintained political cohesion in its early phase.

Since 2001, the Czech Republic had been preparing for its scheduled accession to the European Union in 2004. The Špidla-led government emphasized alignment with EU standards through judicial reform, anti-corruption campaigns, and institutional restructuring. Notably, legislation was passed in 2001 to protect Czech Television (CT) from political influence. These efforts reflected ČSSD’s campaign promise to strengthen democratic institutions and promote public sector transparency. The government also framed social policy as a critical dimension of EU readiness, focusing on welfare and value-based governance.

One of the key priorities of the post-election government was aligning Czech institutions with European Union legal frameworks. Judicial independence, anti-corruption measures, and civil service reforms were emphasized in policy programs. In 2002, the Czech Parliament passed amendments to laws regulating the Constitutional Court and public prosecutor’s office. According to the European Commission’s regular progress report, the reforms were viewed as broadly successful but required further implementation, particularly in staffing and administrative transparency.

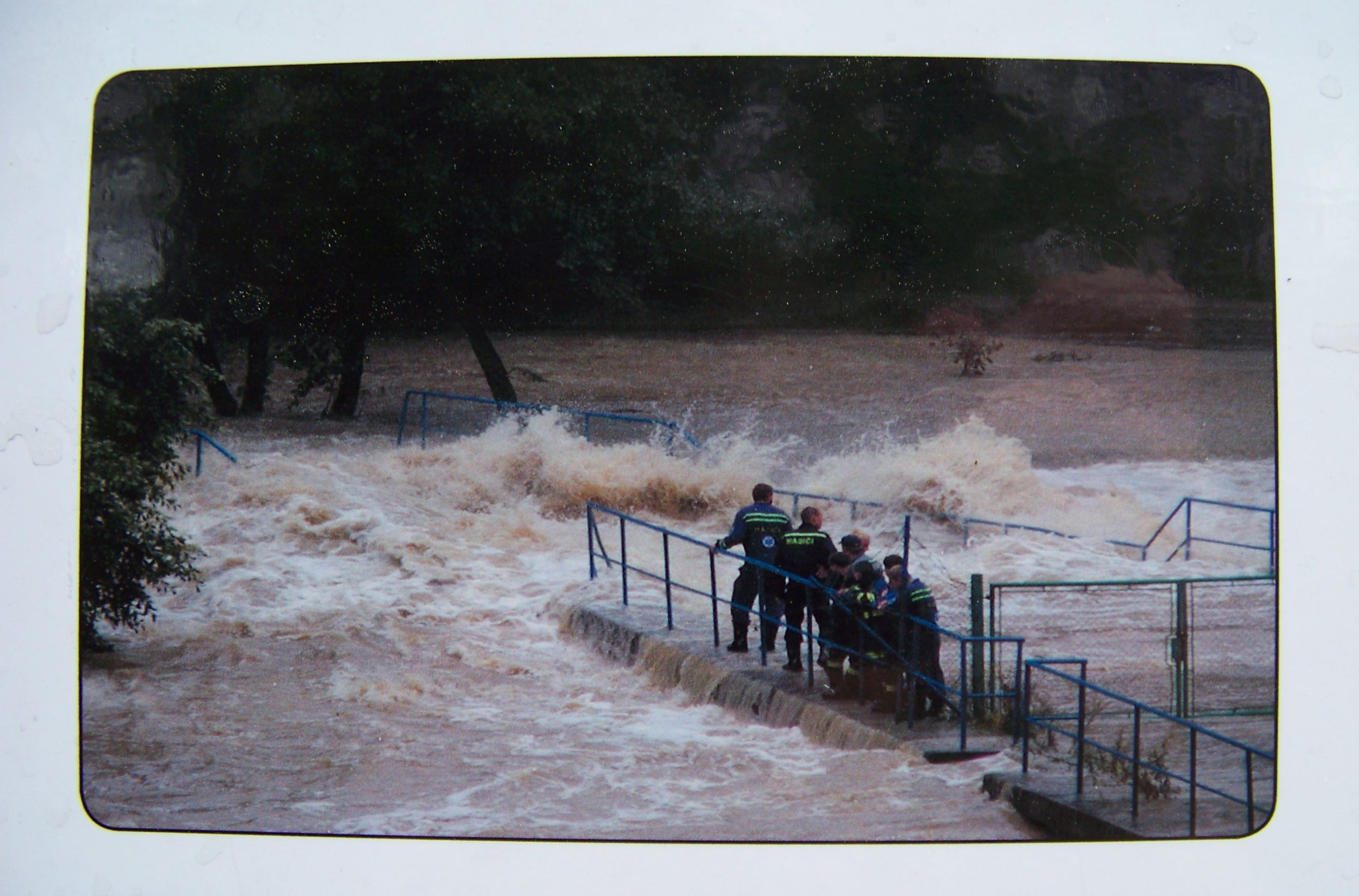
Fire rescue officers monitoring flood levels at Hostivař Reservoir, Prague, during the August 2002 floods

In August 2002 severe flooding struck large parts of the Czech Republic, especially Prague and South Bohemia. The new government led by Prime Minister Špidla launched an immediate emergency response. National rescue operations, temporary relocations, and legislative funding for disaster recovery were implemented. Around 200,000 people were evacuated, and the damage was estimated at more than $3 billion USD. Contemporary reports noted broad public approval of the government’s flood response, particularly its emergency relief measures.
