= Levica =

Levica may refer to:

- The Left (North Macedonia), a political party
- The Left (Slovenia), a political party

== See also ==
- The Left (Czech Republic) (Levice), a political party
- The Left (Poland) (Lewica), a political party
- Left-wing politics
