= 1999 Prague 1 by-election =

1999 Czech senate by-election
- Turnout: 33.7%

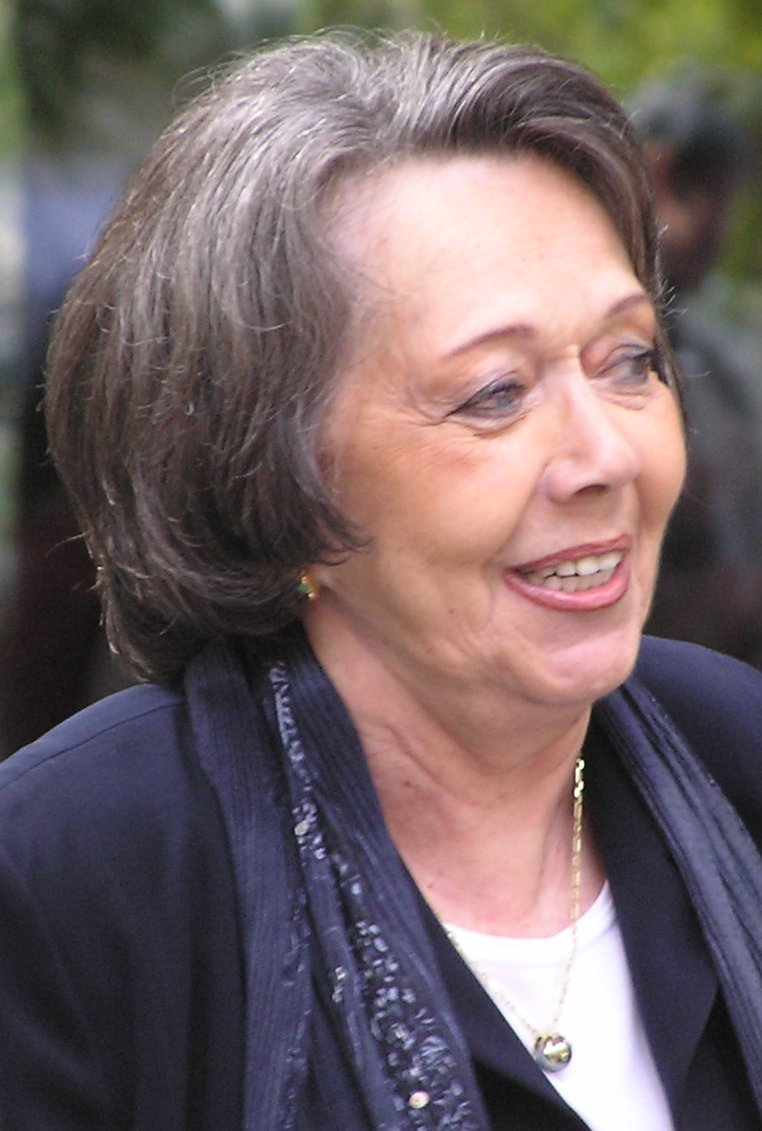

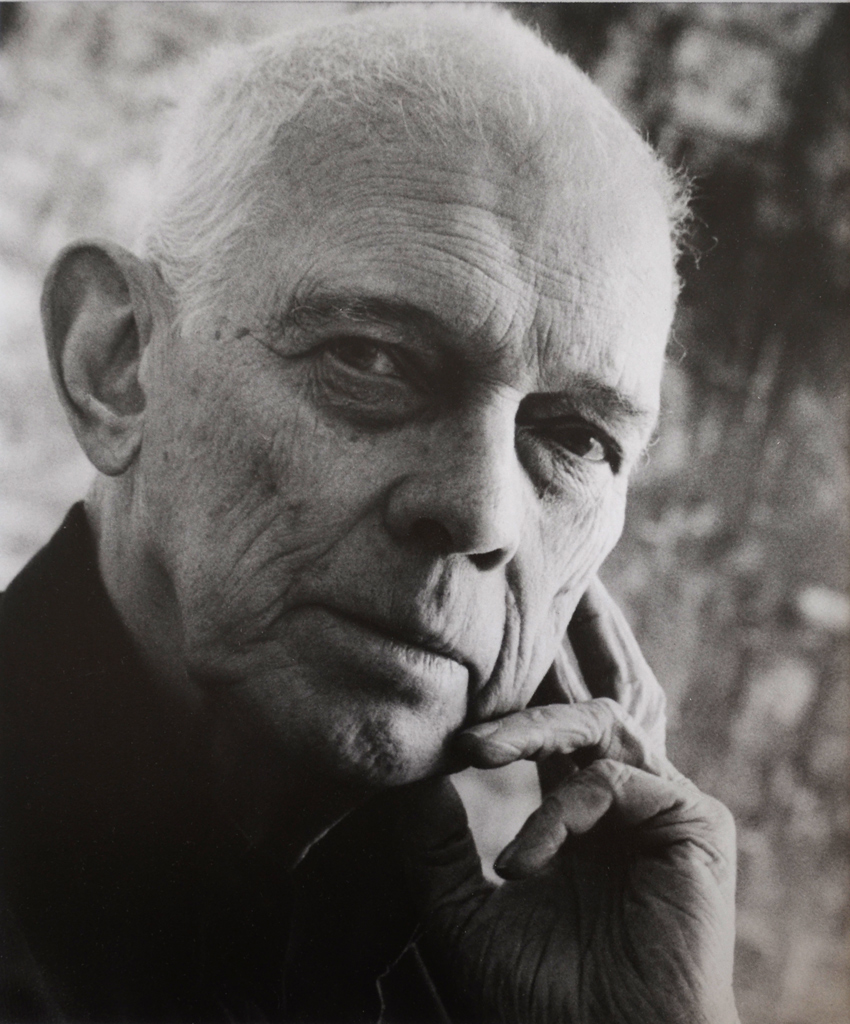

| | First party | Second party | Third party |
|---|---|---|---|
| Candidate | Václav Fischer | Jiřina Jirásková | Ivan Medek |
| Party | Independent | ODS | Four-Coalition |
| Popular vote | 22,461 | 3,844 | 2,948 |
| Percentage | 71.2% | 12.2% | 9.35% |
| | Fourth party | Fifth party |
| Candidate | Stanislav Fischer | Karel Srp |
| Party | KSČM | ČSSD |
| Popular vote | 1,725 | 327 |
| Percentage | 5.47% | 1.04% |

A by-election for the Prague 1 Senate seat was held in the Czech Republic on 27 and 28 August 1999. Václav Fischer was elected a member of Senate with over 70% of votes in the first round of voting. Fischer then became the most popular politician in polls.

== Opinion polls ==
| Agency | Date | Fischer (NK) | Medek (4K) | Jirásková (ODS) | Fischer (KSČM) | Srp (ČSSD) | Tomášková (Rural) | Knot (NEI) | Tyl (RU) |
|---|---|---|---|---|---|---|---|---|---|
| iDnes.cz | 20 August | 68.1 | 16.5 | 11.8 | 1.2 | 1.1 | 1.0 | 0.2 | 0.1 |
| Sofres-Factum | 18–19 August | 51.1 | 10.1 | 18.2 | 4.2 | 4.1 | N/A | N/A | N/A |

== Results ==
| Candidate | Party | Votes | % |
|---|---|---|---|
| Václav Fischer | Independent | 22,461 | 71.24 |
| Jiřina Jirásková | Civic Democratic Party | 3,844 | 12.19 |
| Ivan Medek | Four-Coalition | 2,948 | 9.35 |
| Stanislav Fischer | Communist Party of Bohemia and Moravia | 1,725 | 5.47 |
| Karel Srp | Czech Social Democratic Party | 327 | 1.04 |
| Elvíra Tomášková | Rural Party | 130 | 0.41 |
| Richard Knot | Independent Initiative (NEI) | 48 | 0.15 |
| Otakar Tyl | Republican Union | 46 | 0.15 |
Source: CZSO
