= Václav Fischer =

Czech-German businessman and politician

Senator from Prague 1
- In office 28 August 1999 – 23 November 2002
- Preceded by: Václav Benda
- Succeeded by: Martin Mejstřík

Personal details
- Born: 22 June 1954 (age 72) Prague, Czechoslovakia
- Party: Independent
- Education: Prague University of Economics and Business

Václav Fischer (born 22 June 1954) is a Czech-German businessman and politician. He founded CK Fischer and Fischer Air.

He attended the Prague University of Economics and Business. After graduating from Internal Commerce Studies, Fischer moved to Switzerland for a short time; he was then based in Berlin (then West Germany) and Hamburg, where he worked for some travel agencies and a shipping company. In 1980, Fischer founded his own travel agency in Germany called Fischer Reisen. Due to his success, after the Velvet Revolution that ended the Czechoslovak communist dictatorship, Fischer decided to return to Czechoslovakia to establish the subsidiaries of his companies in the country, as well as to expand to other Central European countries, such as Hungary, Slovakia and Poland.

In 1995, he acquired some air routes of the airline Condor Flugdienst to create his own company, Fischer Air.

Fischer won a seat in the Senate of the Czech Republic in the 1999 by-election for the Prague 1 with 71.24% of the votes. Fischer is the first openly LGBT Czech parliamentarian.
