= 1996 President of the Chamber of Deputies of the Parliament of the Czech Republic election =

- 27 June 1996
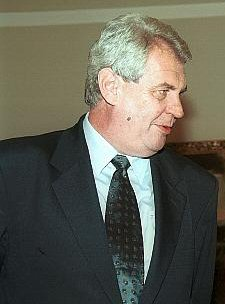

Candidate	Miloš Zeman	Jan Vik
Party	ČSSD	SPR–RSČ
Popular vote	103	27
Percentage	55.08%	14.44%
President before election
Milan Uhde
ODS
Elected President
Miloš Zeman
ČSSD

Election of the President of the Chamber of Deputies of the Parliament of the Czech Republic was held on 27 June 1996. Miloš Zeman was elected the new President when he defeated Jan Vik.

== Background ==
1996 legislative election concluded with victory of governing coalition. Coalition was short of parliamentary majority and needed support of opposition Czech Social Democratic Party. Coalition offered support in President election to the leader of Social Democratic Party Miloš Zeman in exchange for parliamentary support.

== Voting ==
187 MPs were present. Zeman received 103 votes, Vik received 30 votes and 57 votes were invalid. Zeman became the new President.
