= CK Fischer =

Company in the Czech Republic

Cestovní kancelář FISCHER, a.s.
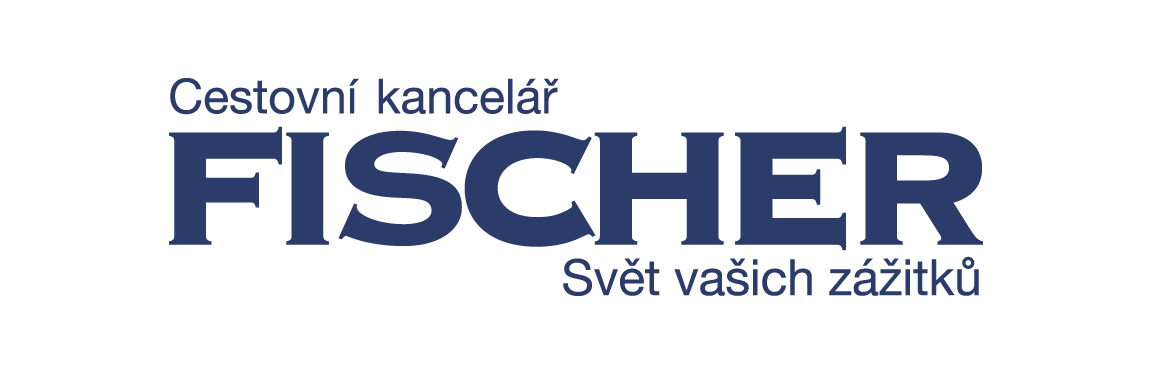
- Founded: 1991
- Founder: Fischer Reisen GmbH
- Defunct: 1 January 2023
- Revenue: ▲CZK 4.0 bn. (2015)
- Net income: ▲CZK 0.1 bn. (2015)
- Total assets: ▲CZK 2.0 bn. (2015)
- Total equity: ▲CZK 0.8 bn. (2015)
- Owner: DER Touristik Group GmbH
- Parent: DER Touristik Eastern Europe a.s.

Cestovní kancelář FISCHER, a.s. (lit. 'FISCHER Travel Agency') was the second largest Czech travel agency by revenue.

== History ==
In 1991 German travel agency Fischer Reisen GmbH set up its Czechoslovak subsidiary. In 1994 Václav Fischer became its sole owner. In 2003 holding KKCG owned by Karel Komárek acquired receivables of Komerční banka towards CK Fischer and subsequently acquired controlling share in CK Fischer. In 2007 KKCG became the sole owner of CK Fischer. In 2020 KKCG sold the company to REWE Group.

Václav Fischer had close ties to competing travel agency Tomi Tour, which was using slogan Václav Fischer recommends (Václav Fischer doporučuje). Tomi Tour went bust in July 2009.

== See also ==
- Fischer Air
