= Petr Cibulka =

Czech politician and former dissident (born 1950)

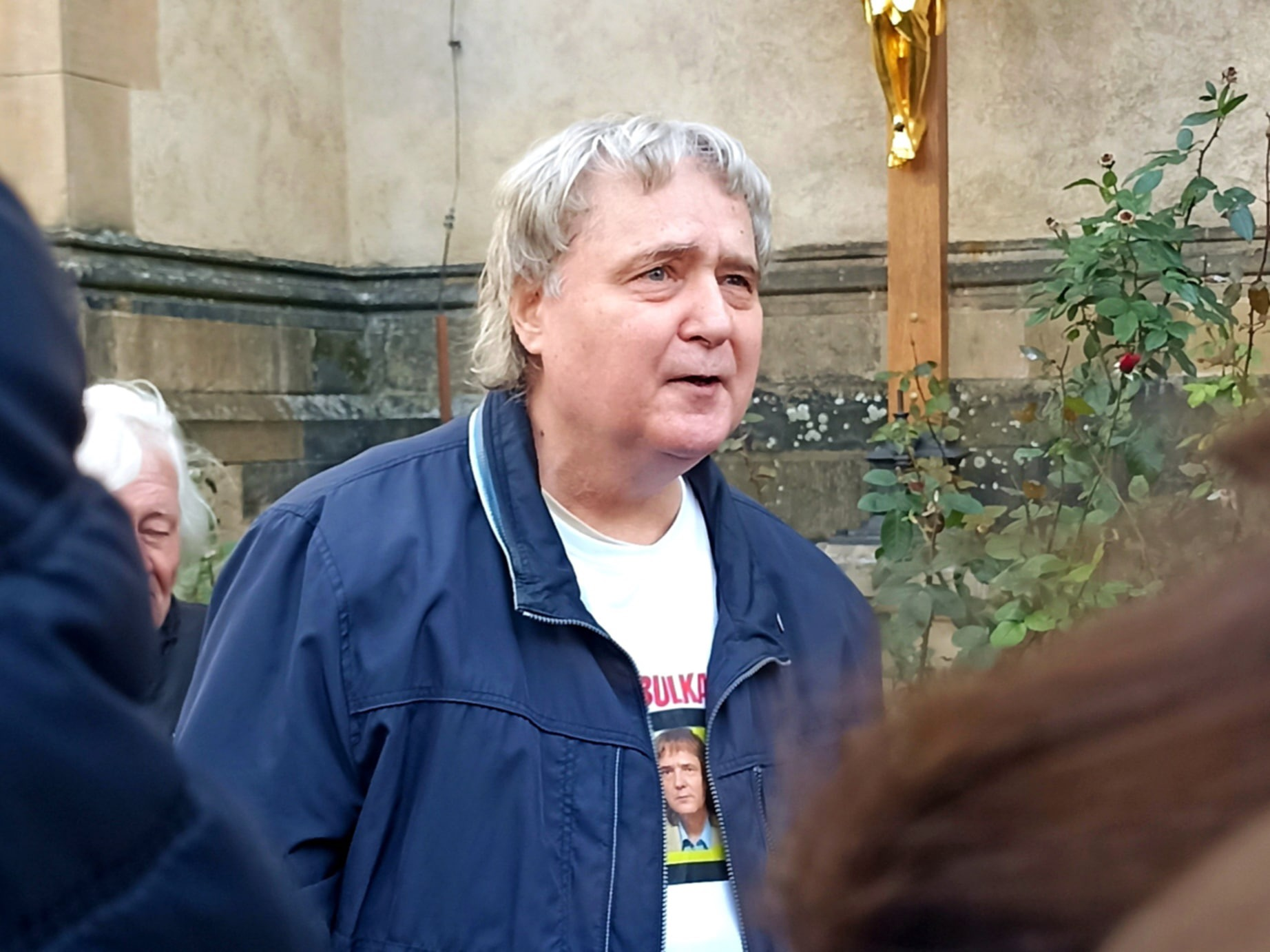
- Cibulka in 2025

Leader of the Right Bloc
- Incumbent
- Assumed office 22 July 2000

Personal details
- Born: 27 October 1950 (age 75) Brno, Czechoslovakia (now in the Czech Republic)
- Party: Right Bloc (since 1996)
- Other political affiliations: Club of Committed Non-Party Members (1991–1992)

Petr Cibulka (born 27 October 1950) is a Czech politician and former dissident. He is the founder and leader of the minor Right Bloc political party.

== Communist era ==
Cibulka was born in Brno, Czechoslovakia. As a former member of Charter 77, he was imprisoned multiple times during the Communist rule in Czechoslovakia. Prior to the Velvet Revolution in 1989, Cibulka had been arrested three times, and spent a total of four years in prison for distributing non-official cultural and musical material. During the Velvet Revolution, he was again arrested and imprisoned.

== StB archives disclosure ==
In the early 1990s, Cibulka published material from still-classified StB archives, containing lists of tens of thousands names of people with connections to the secret services. In 1999, he published a second edition of the list in book form. The book sold five times as many copies as the average work of fiction. A searchable electronic version was added later.

In 2003, the Czech government published similar, but much shorter lists, along with the very few personal files kept by the StB.

== Other activities ==
Cibulka published an online political journal entitled "Uncensored News" (Czech: Necenzurované Noviny).

He is also the founder and leader of a tiny political party, the Right Bloc (Czech: Pravý blok). He was nominated by the party as its candidate in the 2013 presidential election, but he was able to collect only 300 signatures of the required 50,000, and did not qualify as a candidate.
