= Party of the Democratic Left (Czech Republic) =

Party of the Democratic Left Strana demokratické levice
- Leader: Lotar Indruch; Josef Mečl; Marie Stiborová
- Founded: 9 April 1990
- Dissolved: 21 June 1997
- Merged into: Party of Democratic Socialism
- Ideology: Democratic socialism
- Political position: Centre-left to left-wing
- International affiliation: Socialist International (observer)
- Colours: Red

The Party of the Democratic Left (Czech: Strana demokratické levice, SDL) was a democratic-socialist political party in the Czech Republic from 1990 to 1997.

From 1992 to 1994, SDL was a member of a coalition called Left Bloc (Levý blok) that gained 14.05% in the 1992 Czech legislative election and 14.27% in the 1992 Czechoslovak parliamentary election. They did not form a part of the government.

On 21 June 1997, the party dissolved and merged into Party of Democratic Socialism.

== Name changes ==
- Democratic Left of the ČSFR (9 April 1990)
- Party of the Democratic Left (1993)

== See also ==
- Party of the Democratic Left (Slovakia)
- Party of Democratic Socialism (Czech Republic)
