= Jiří Oberfalzer =

Czech Republic Politician

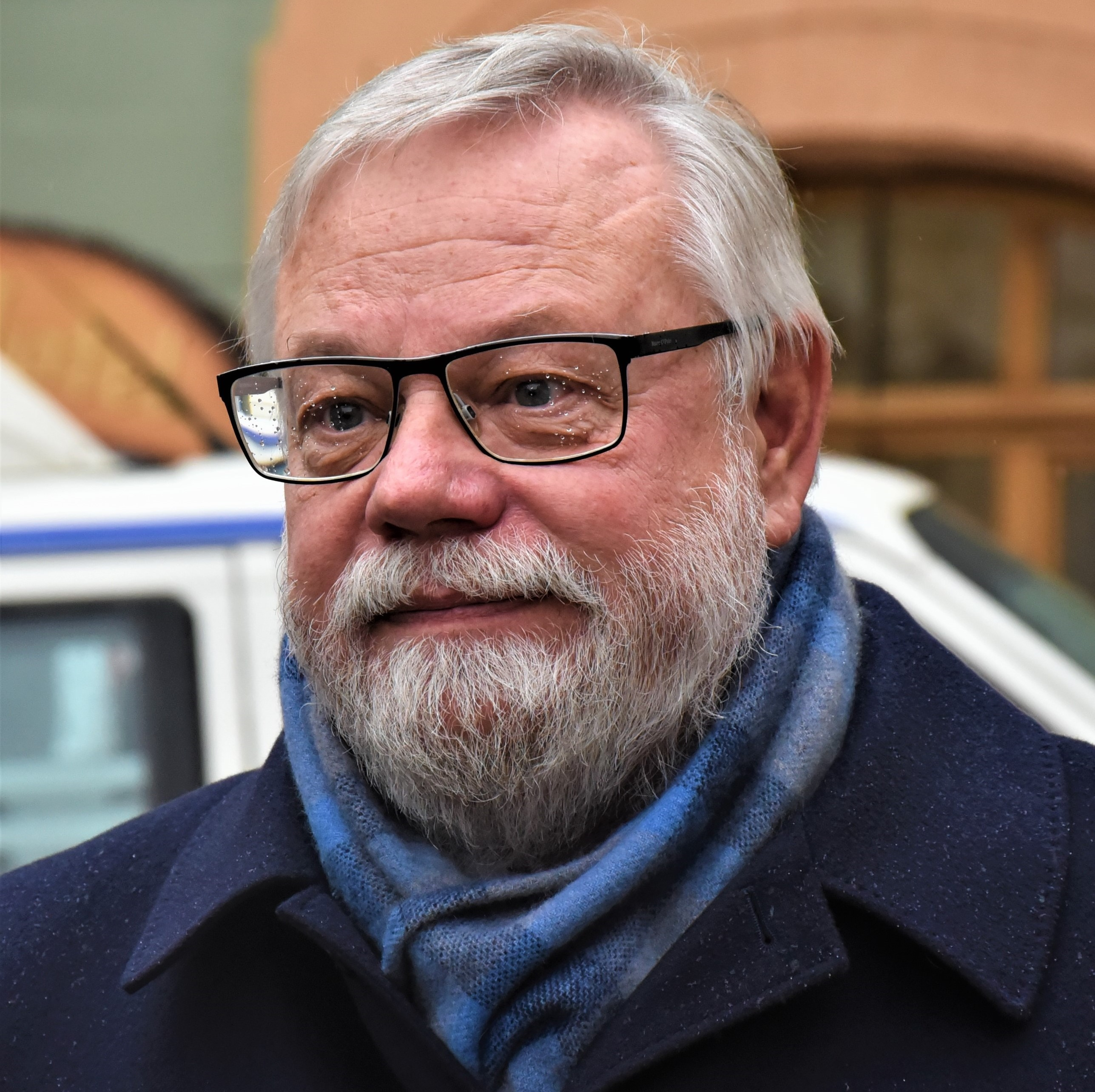
- Oberfalzer in 2020

Senator from Beroun
- Incumbent
- Assumed office 13 November 2004
- Preceded by: Jiří Rückl

Personal details
- Born: 17 January 1954 (age 72) Karlovy Vary, Czechoslovakia
- Party: ODS (1999–present)
- Education: Charles University

Jiří Oberfalzer (born 17 January 1954) is a Czech politician. He is the vice-president of the Senate of the Czech Republic and serves as a member of the municipal council of Králův Dvůr.

== Early life and education ==
He was born in Karlovy Vary, Czechoslovakia on 17 January 1954.

He is a graduate of the Charles University from the faculty of mathematics and physics. He has five children.

== Career ==
He is an actor, high school teacher, politician and since 2018 serving as the vice president of the Senate of the Czech Republic. He previously served as head of the Press department of the Chancellery of the President of Czechoslovakia and executive director of the Patriae Foundation in the 1990s.

In 1999–2004, he worked in British American Tobacco.

== Membership ==
He is a member of Civic Democratic Party since 1999.
