= 1998 Czech presidential election =

- 20 January 1998
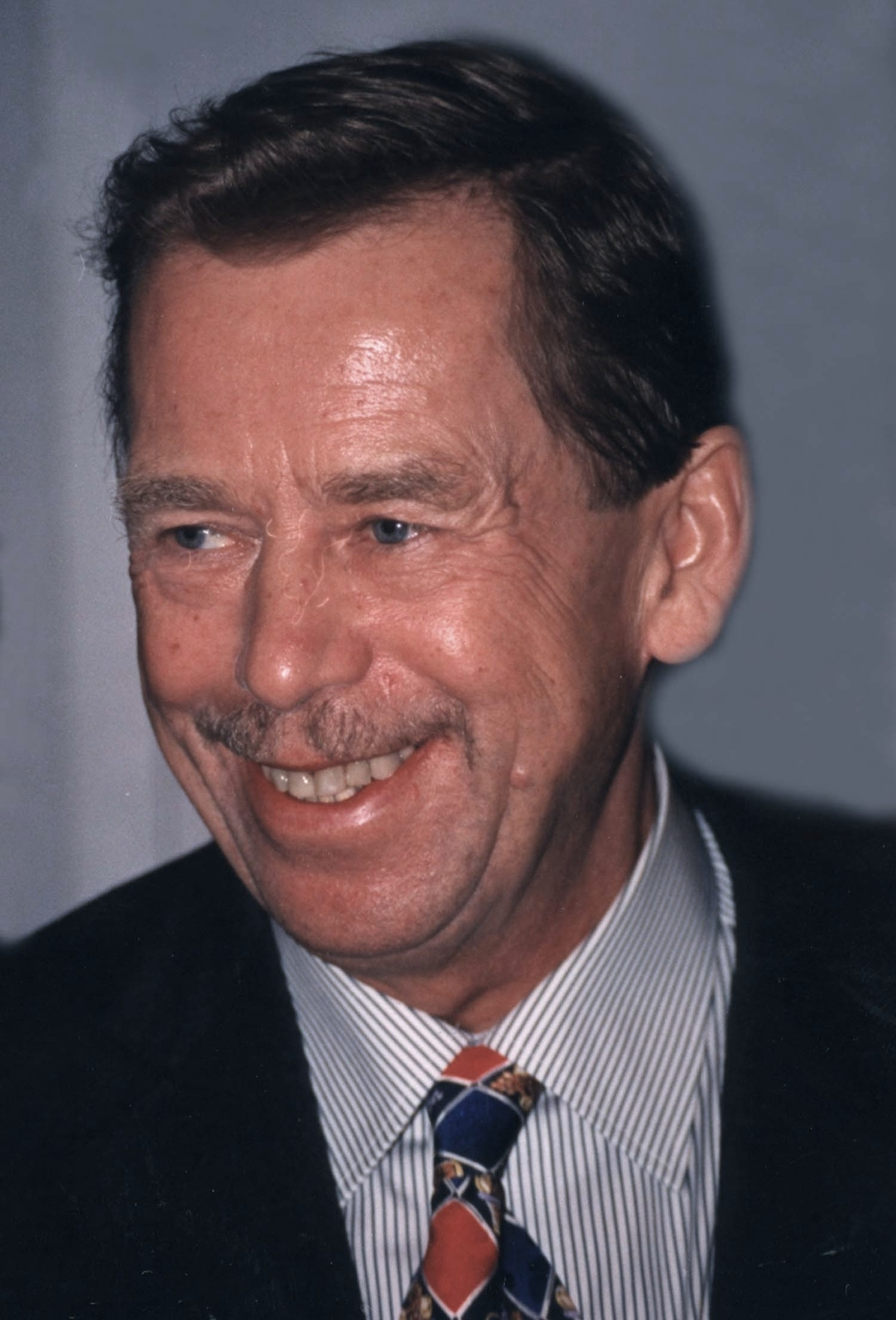
Nominee	Václav Havel
Party	Independent
Electoral vote	146
Percentage	52.3%
President before election
Václav Havel
Independent
Elected President
Václav Havel
Independent

Indirect presidential elections were held in the Czech Republic on 20 January 1998 to elect a new president. The Parliament re-elected incumbent President Václav Havel in the second round. The arrest of an opposition candidate, Miroslav Sládek, was criticised by Havel's opponents.

== Electoral system ==
President of the Czech Republic was elected indirectly by a joint session of the Czech Parliament. Each ballot can have at most three rounds. In the first round, a victorious candidate requires an absolute majority in both the Chamber of Deputies and the Senate. Given a 200-seat Chamber and an 81-seat Senate, a successful first-round candidate requires 101 deputies and 41 senators.

If no single candidate gets a majority of both the Chamber and the Senate, a second round is then called for. At this stage, a candidate requires an absolute majority of merely those actually present at the time of voting in both the Chamber of Deputies and the Senate. The actual number of votes required in the second round might be the same as in the first round, but it can be a little less, due to the absence of a few parliamentarians. Nevertheless, in this second round, a single candidate would need to win a majority in both the Chamber and the Senate.

Should no single candidate achieve a majority of both houses then present, a third round is necessitated. In this final round, which can happen within 14 days of the first round, an absolute majority of deputies and senators present suffices. At this stage, the individual houses of parliament are not considered separately. Assuming that all members of parliament are present, all that is required to win is 141 votes, regardless of the house of origin. If no candidate wins in the third round, another ballot has to be considered in a subsequent joint session of parliament. The process continues under the same rules until a candidate prevails.

== Parties in parliament ==
Party	Chamber of Deputies	Senate	Endorsed candidate
Czech Social Democratic Party (ČSSD)	61 / 200	25 / 81	Václav Havel
Civic Democratic Party (ODS)	36 / 200	31 / 81	Václav Havel
Freedom Union (US)	33 / 200	1 / 81	Václav Havel
Communist Party of Bohemia and Moravia (KSČM)	22 / 200	2 / 81	Stanislav Fischer
Christian and Democratic Union – Czechoslovak People's Party (KDU-ČSL)	18 / 200	13 / 81	Václav Havel
Rally for the Republic – Republican Party of Czechoslovakia (SPR-RSČ)	18 / 200	0 / 200	Miroslav Sládek
Civic Democratic Alliance (ODA)	13 / 200	7 / 81	Václav Havel
Democratic Union (DEU)	0 / 200	1 / 81	Václav Havel
Independents	0 / 200	1 / 81	

== Candidates ==
- Václav Havel - The incumbent president of the Czech Republic. He was supported by coalition government (US, KDU-ČSL and ODA) and opposition Czech Social Democratic Party. He was also officially supported by ODS with which he was in conflict.
- Stanislav Fischer - A candidate of Communist party and Member of Parliament.
- Miroslav Sládek - A member of Parliament and leader of SPR-RSČ. He was in police custody at the time of election.

== Results ==
Václav Havel received 130 votes in the first round and was the only candidate who qualified for the second round, as he gained the most votes in both chambers of parliament. There he received 146 votes of 279 and won by seven votes, but in the Chamber of Deputies he won by only one vote. This was controversial as Miroslav Sládek couldn't vote in the election due to his arrest. If Sládek had participated in the vote, Havel would probably have been elected in the third round. Sládek's Republican Party called Havel's victory illegal and refused to acknowledge it. The First Lady Dagmar Havlová whistled during a speech of a Republican MP Jan Vik.

Candidate	First round				Second round			
Candidate	Deputies	Senators	Total	%	Deputies	Senators	Total	%
Václav Havel	91	39	130	70.65	99	47	146	100
Stanislav Fischer	26	5	31	16.85				
Miroslav Sládek	22	1	23	12.50				
Total	139	45	184	100	99	47	146	100
