= Ledce (Kladno District) =

- Municipality
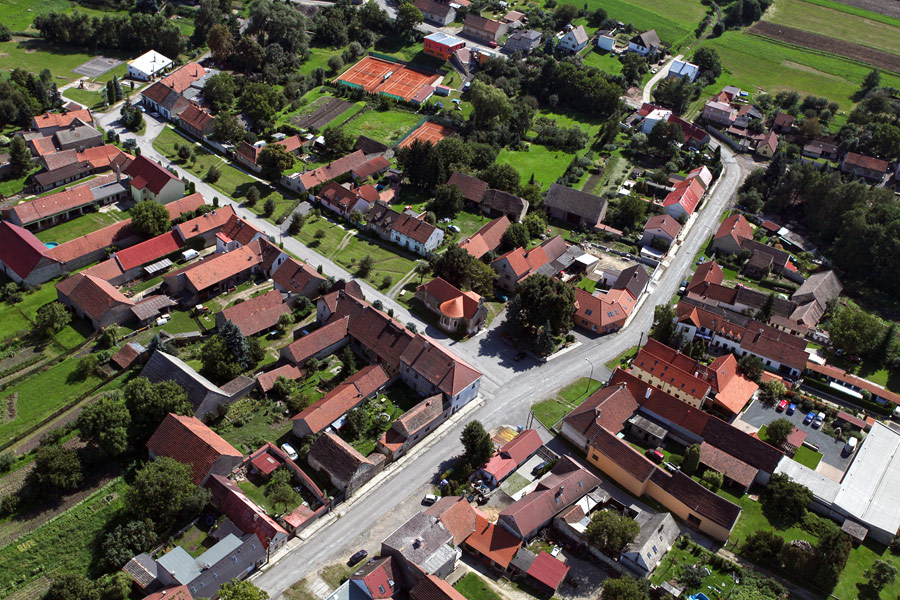
- Aerial view of the centre of Ledce

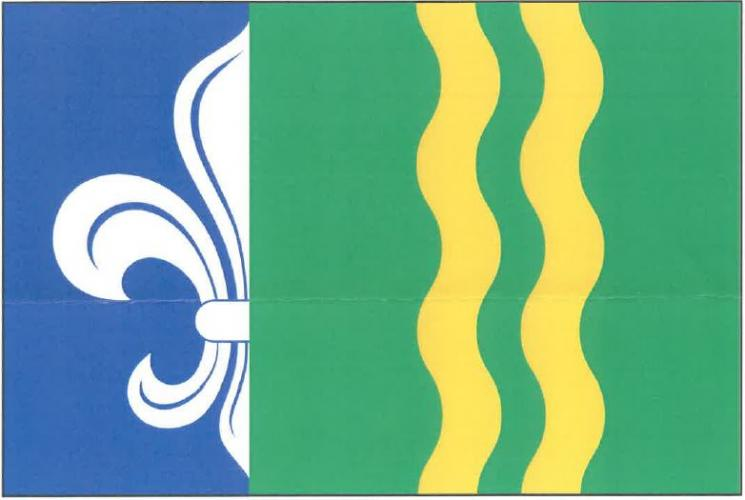
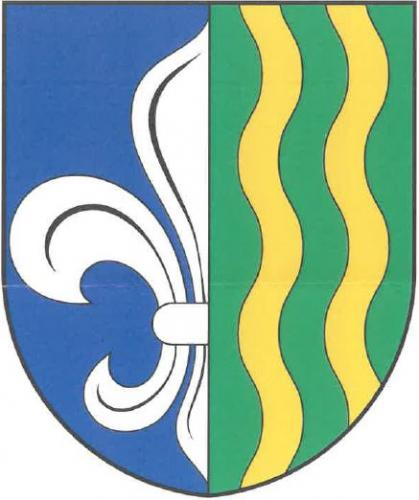
- Flag Coat of arms

- Location in the Czech Republic
- Coordinates: 50°11′47″N 14°0′18″E
- Country: Czech Republic
- Region: Central Bohemian
- District: Kladno
- First mentioned: 1400

Area
  - Total: 5.51 km^{2} (2.13 sq mi)
- Elevation: 340 m (1,120 ft)

Population (2026-01-01)
  - Total: 503
  - Density: 91.3/km^{2} (236/sq mi)
- Time zone: UTC+1 (CET)
  - Summer (DST): UTC+2 (CEST)
- Postal code: 273 05
- Website: www.obec-ledce.cz

Ledce is a municipality and village in Kladno District in the Central Bohemian Region of the Czech Republic. It has about 500 inhabitants.

== Demographics ==
Historical population
| Year | Pop. | ±% |
|---|---|---|
| 1869 | 432 | — |
| 1880 | 491 | +13.7% |
| 1890 | 506 | +3.1% |
| 1900 | 506 | +0.0% |
| 1910 | 628 | +24.1% |
| 1921 | 624 | −0.6% |
| 1930 | 638 | +2.2% |
| 1950 | 546 | −14.4% |
| 1961 | 580 | +6.2% |
| 1970 | 542 | −6.6% |
| 1980 | 575 | +6.1% |
| 1991 | 551 | −4.2% |
| 2001 | 457 | −17.1% |
| 2011 | 433 | −5.3% |
| 2021 | 585 | +35.1% |
Source: Censuses

== Notable people ==
- Stanislav Fischer (born 1936), astrophysicist and politician
