= Útěchov =

- Municipality
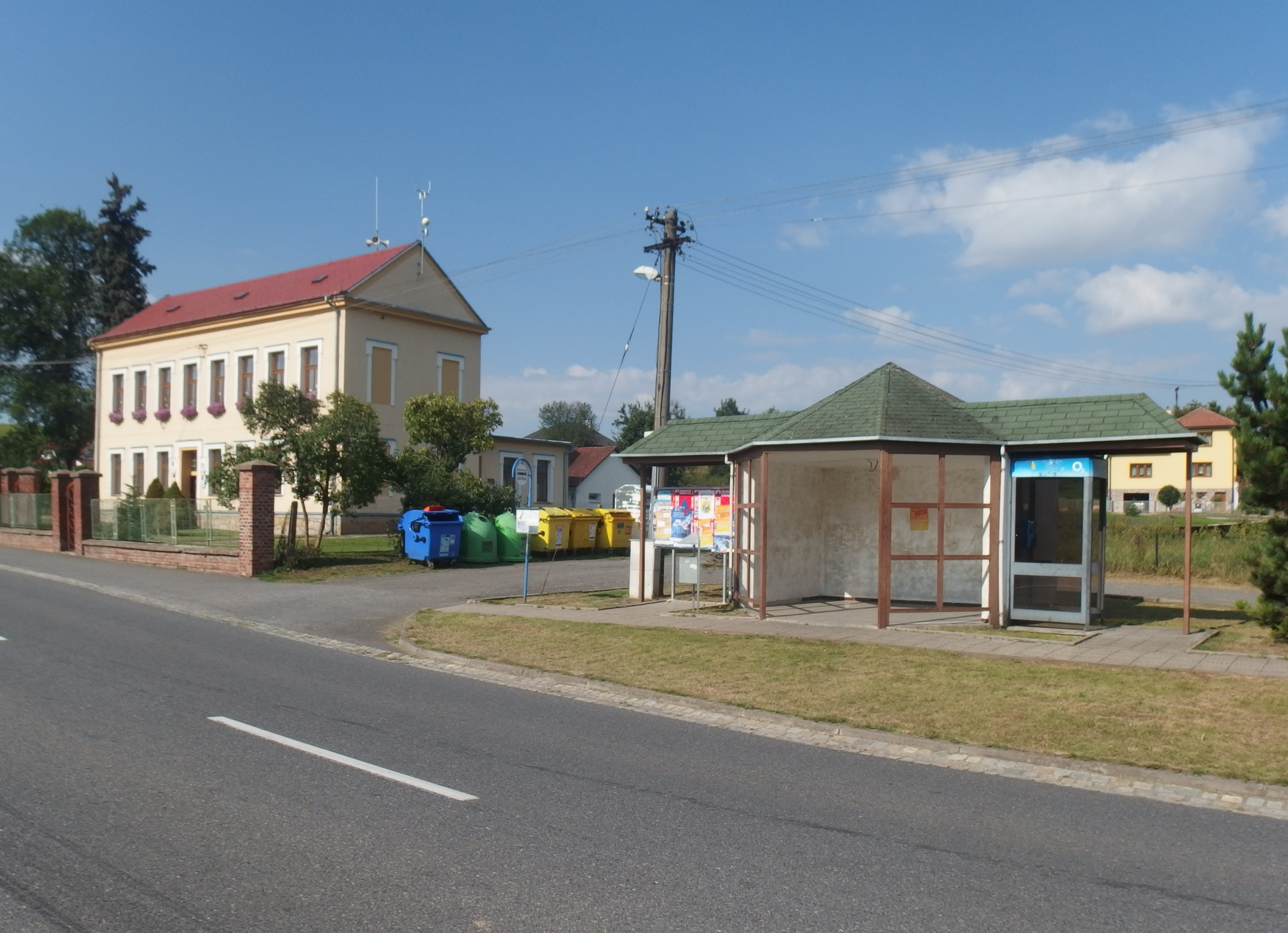
- Bus stop and municipal office

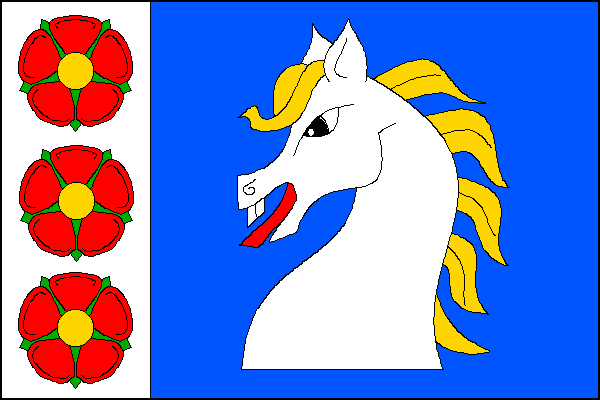
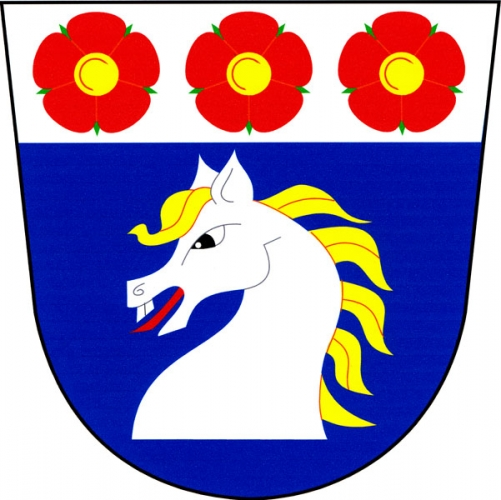
- Flag Coat of arms

- Location in the Czech Republic
- Coordinates: 49°43′42″N 16°38′41″E
- Country: Czech Republic
- Region: Pardubice
- District: Svitavy
- First mentioned: 1365

Area
  - Total: 5.48 km^{2} (2.12 sq mi)
- Elevation: 370 m (1,210 ft)

Population (2026-01-01)
  - Total: 348
  - Density: 63.5/km^{2} (164/sq mi)
- Time zone: UTC+1 (CET)
  - Summer (DST): UTC+2 (CEST)
- Postal code: 571 01
- Website: www.utechov.cz

Útěchov is a municipality and village in Svitavy District in the Pardubice Region of the Czech Republic. It has about 300 inhabitants.

== Demographics ==
Historical population
| Year | Pop. | ±% |
|---|---|---|
| 1869 | 482 | — |
| 1880 | 504 | +4.6% |
| 1890 | 480 | −4.8% |
| 1900 | 461 | −4.0% |
| 1910 | 461 | +0.0% |
| 1921 | 415 | −10.0% |
| 1930 | 427 | +2.9% |
| 1950 | 249 | −41.7% |
| 1961 | 239 | −4.0% |
| 1970 | 219 | −8.4% |
| 1980 | 193 | −11.9% |
| 1991 | 186 | −3.6% |
| 2001 | 202 | +8.6% |
| 2011 | 265 | +31.2% |
| 2021 | 329 | +24.2% |
Source: Censuses
