= Marie Stiborová =

Czech politician (1950–2020)

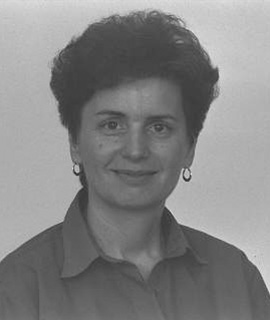

Member of Parliament for Prague
- In office 6 June 1992 – 6 June 1996

Personal details
- Born: 2 February 1950 Prague, Czechoslovakia
- Died: 13 February 2020 (aged 70)
- Party: Communist Party of Czechoslovakia; Communist Party of Bohemia and Moravia; Left Bloc
- Education: Charles University

Marie Stiborová (2 February 1950 – 13 February 2020) was a Czech politician and university lecturer. She was a member of the Czech National Council and Chamber of Deputies. She was also the candidate for the Communist Party (KSČM) in the 1993 presidential election. She later became the leader of the reformist wing within KSČM and established the Left Bloc.

== Biography ==
Stiborová was born in 1950. She studied Chemistry at Charles University and became a lecturer at the university. She joined the Communist Party in 1976 and became a member of Parliament in 1986. The Communist Party nominated her for the president of the Czech Republic in 1993. She lost to Václav Havel.

Stiborová left the Communist Party in 1993 and established Left Bloc. She left politics in 1997.
