= Rally for the Republic – Republican Party of Czechoslovakia =

Czech political party

Rally for the Republic – Republican Party of Czechoslovakia Sdružení pro republiku – Republikánská strana Československa
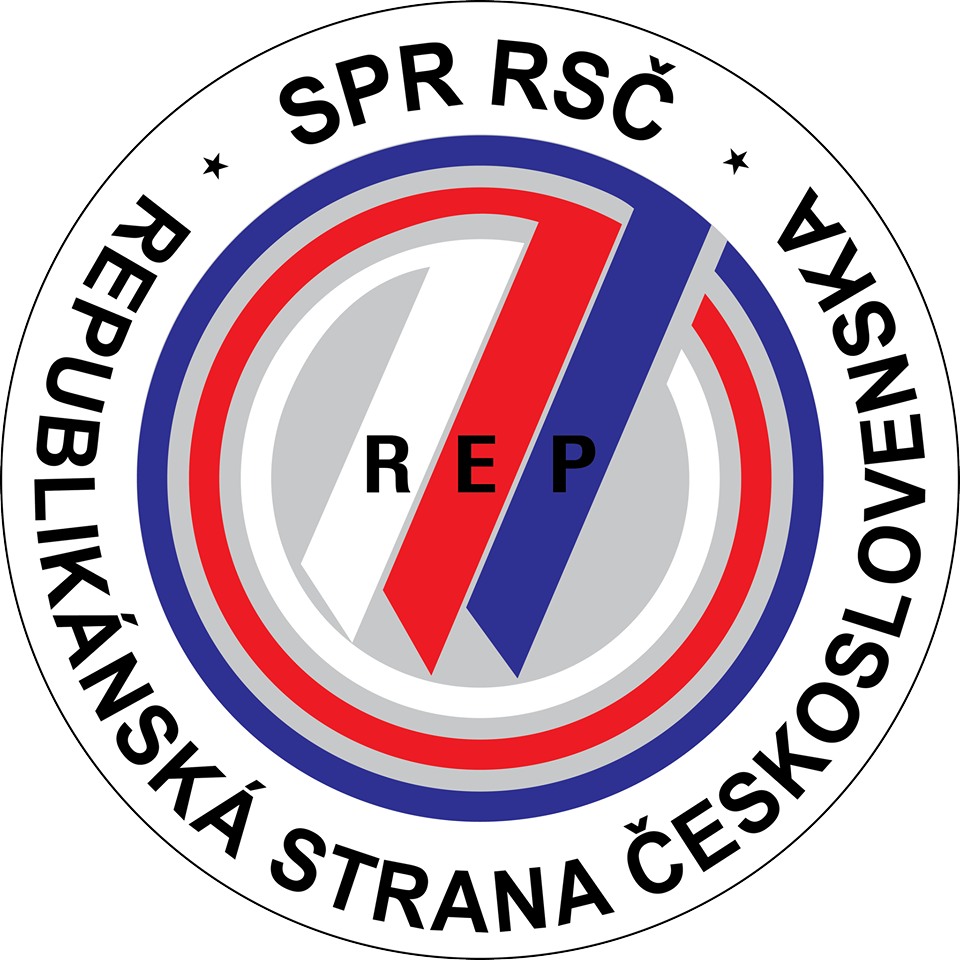
- Leader: Miroslav Sládek
- Founded: 1989 2016
- Dissolved: 2001 2026
- Headquarters: Štefánikova 50, Brno
- Youth wing: Republican Youth
- Ideology: Czech nationalism; Right-wing populism; Moravian autonomism; Anti-Germanism; Antiziganism
- Political position: Far-right
- European affiliation: Euronat
- Colours: White, Red, Blue

Party flag

Website
- http://www.spr-rsc.cz/

The Rally for the Republic – Republican Party of Czechoslovakia (Czech: Sdružení pro republiku - Republikánská strana Československa, abbreviated to Republikáni or SPR–RSČ) was a minor political party in the Czech Republic, strongly opposed to the EU, NATO and immigration. The party and its leader Miroslav Sládek are particularly known for their radical attitudes towards Roma people (antiziganism) and Germans.

== History ==
The party was founded on December 30, 1989 as one of the first political parties in post-communist Czechoslovakia. It peaked in the 1996 Czech parliamentary election with 8% of the vote (485,072 electors, 18 seats in the 200-seat Chamber of Deputies) but declined after that, and in 2001 disbanded due to financial irregularities – specifically the theft of party funds by the chairman, who used the money to fund his luxury lifestyle.

The party was reestablished in 2001 as Republicans of Miroslav Sládek (RMS, Republikáni Miroslava Sládka). Sládek immediately set up a new party; to distinguish it from the other "republican" parties his name was added. The new party failed to attract a significant number of votes (0.9% during 2002 Czech parliamentary election was the highest). For the 2006 elections RMS joined with the National Party, which obtained 0.1% of votes. The number of active members was estimated to be in the dozens at most.

On May 17, 2008 this new party merged with five other minor parties to form the SPR–RSČ. The renewed party chose Sládek as chairman, yet even after the merger the party failed to gain political traction. For non-compliance with statutory obligations, the Supreme Administrative Court of the Czech Republic (acting on a Czech government proposal) decided in December 2010 to temporarily suspend the Republican party's activities. Finally, on 15 May 2013, the Court ordered its complete dissolution.

The party was reestablished once again in February 2016 under the name Rally for the Republic – Republican Party of Czechoslovakia 2016. On 28 January 2026, the party was dissolved once again.

== Election results ==
1996

1998

=== Czech National Council ===
Year	Vote	Vote %	Seats	Place
1990	72,048	1.00	0 / 200	10th
1992	387,026▲	5.98▲	14 / 200	6th

=== Slovak National Council ===
Year	Vote	Vote %	Seats	Place
1990	7,023	0.21	0 / 150	13th
1992	10,069▲	0.33▲	0 / 150	16th

=== Chamber of Deputies ===
Year	Vote	Vote %	Seats	Place
1996	485,072▲	8.01▲	18 / 200	5th▲
1998	232,965▼	3.90▼	0 / 200	6th▼
2002	46,325▼	0.97▼	0 / 200	7th▼
2006	9,341▼	0.18▼	0 / 200	15th▼
2010	1,993▼	0.03▼	0 / 200	19th▼
2017	9,857▲	0.19▲	0 / 200	17th▲

=== European Parliament ===
Year	Vote	Vote %	Seats	Place
2004	15,767	0.67	0 / 24	11th
2009	7,492 ▼	0.32 ▼	0 / 24	19th ▼
2019	4,284 ▲	0.18 ▲	0 / 24	24th ▲

=== Presidential ===
Indirect Election	Candidate	First round result			Second round result			Third round result		
Indirect Election	Candidate	Votes	%Votes	Result	Votes	%Votes	Result	Votes	%Votes	Result
1993	Miroslav Sládek	14	8.1	3rd place	—					
1998	Miroslav Sládek	23	12.5	3rd place	—					
