= Stanislav Fischer =

Czech astrophysicist and politician

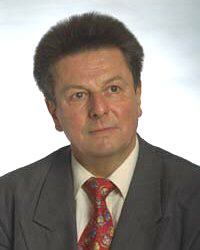

Member of the Chamber of Deputies
- In office 1998–2002
- In office 2004–2006

Personal details
- Born: 30 November 1936 (age 89) Ledce, Czechoslovakia
- Party: KSČM; KSČ
- Education: Charles University; Moscow State University
- Profession: astrophysicist

Stanislav Fischer (born 30 November 1936) is a Czech astrophysicist and politician. He was a Communist candidate for president in the 1998 election.

== Biography ==
Fischer was born in Ledce on 30 November 1936. He studied Atomic physics at Charles University and Moscow State University. His scientific work focuses on Cosmic ray. He became a member of the Communist party in 1957.

Fischer ran for Senate in 1996 but wasn't elected. The Communist Party nominated him for president in 1998 Czech presidential election. Fischer received 31 electoral votes and came second but only Václav Havel advanced to the second round. He participated in subsequent 1998 Czech parliamentary election and became Member of Chamber of Deputies.

Fischer became candidate for 1999 Prague 1 by-election. Fischer received only 5.5% of votes and wasn't elected.
