= Party of Democratic Socialism (Czech Republic) =

Party of Democratic Socialism Strana demokratického socialismu
- Abbreviation: SDS
- Leader: Milan Neubert
- Founded: 1997
- Dissolved: 2020
- Merger of: Party of the Democratic Left; Left Bloc
- Merged into: The Left
- Headquarters: Holečkova 8, Prague
- Ideology: Democratic socialism
- Political position: Left-wing
- European affiliation: Party of the European Left
- Colours: Red, Green

Website
- www.sds.cz

The Party of Democratic Socialism (Czech: Strana demokratického socialismu; SDS) was a democratic socialist political party in the Czech Republic. It was a founding member party of the Party of the European Left.

The party has its name since December 1997. It's the political unification of SDL (Party of the Democratic Left) and LB (Left Block) that took place in June 1997. In the beginning the party had the name LB-SDL.

During 2017 Czech legislative election and many previous elections, members of the party ran on the Communist Party of Bohemia and Moravia's ballot.

In 2020, the party and The Real Left initiative merged into The Left.
