= Jiří Pospíšil (politician, born 1949) =

Czech politician (1949–2024)

Member of the European Parliament for the Czech Republic
- In office 1 May 2004 – 19 July 2004

Member of the Senate of the Czech Republic for Senate district 14 – České Budějovice
- In office 23 November 1996 – 28 October 2012
- Preceded by: constituency established
- Succeeded by: Jiří Šesták

Member of the Federal Assembly
- In office 30 January 1990 – 31 December 1992

Personal details
- Born: 9 May 1949 Brno, Czechoslovakia
- Died: 16 November 2024 (aged 75)
- Party: KSČ (1968); OF (1989–1991); ODS (1991–2024)
- Education: Masaryk University
- Occupation: Psychologist

Jiří Pospíšil (9 May 1949 – 16 November 2024) was a Czech psychologist and politician. A member of the Civic Democratic Party, he served in the Senate from 1996 to 2012 and was a member of the European Parliament from May to July 2004.

Pospíšil died on 16 November 2024, at the age of 75.
