= Rudolf Medek =

Czech poet, army-related prose writer, and general

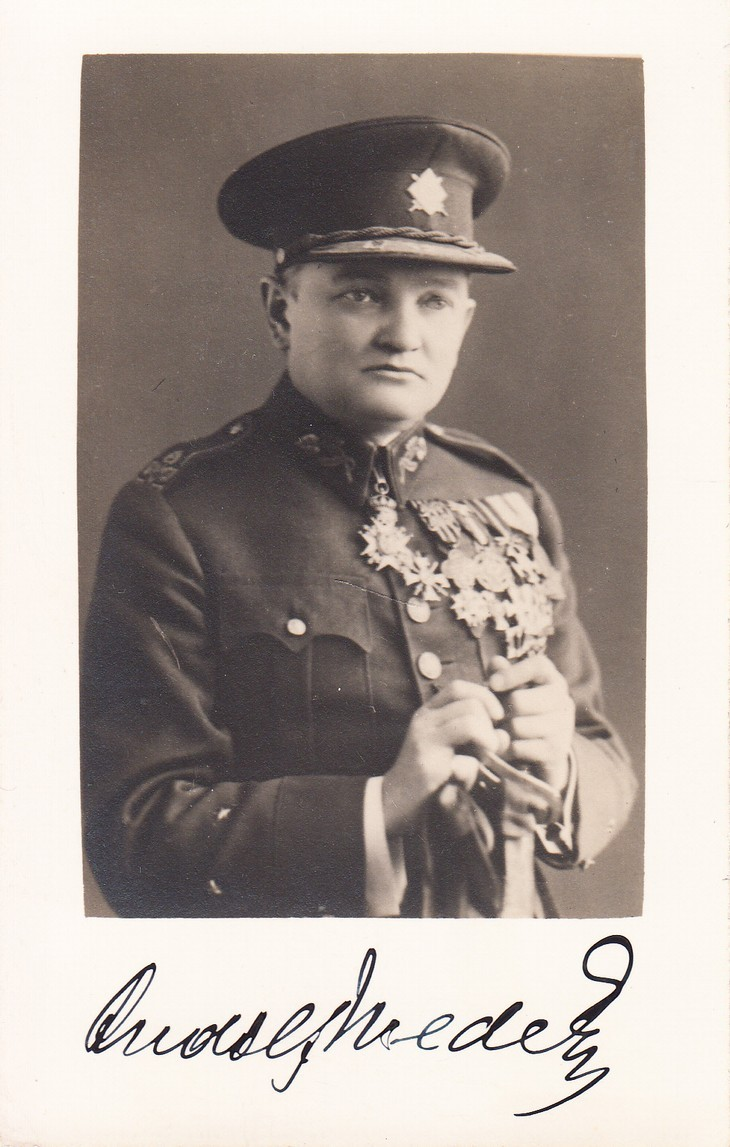
Rudolf Medek

Rudolf Medek (8 January 1890 in Hradec Králové – 22 August 1940) was a Czech poet, army-related prose writer, and a general in the Czechoslovak Legions in Russia. In 1919 he was awarded the Distinguished Service Order by George V which he sent back after the Munich Agreement, as he did with his Légion d'honneur insignia.

He was the father of the musician and journalist Ivan Medek, and the painter Mikuláš Medek.

== Partial bibliography ==
- Rokoko - poem
- Půlnoc bohů (English: Midnight of Gods) (1912) - book of poetry
- Anabáze - army document
- Plukovník Švec - army drama
