= Ivan Medek =

Czech classical music critic (1925–2010)

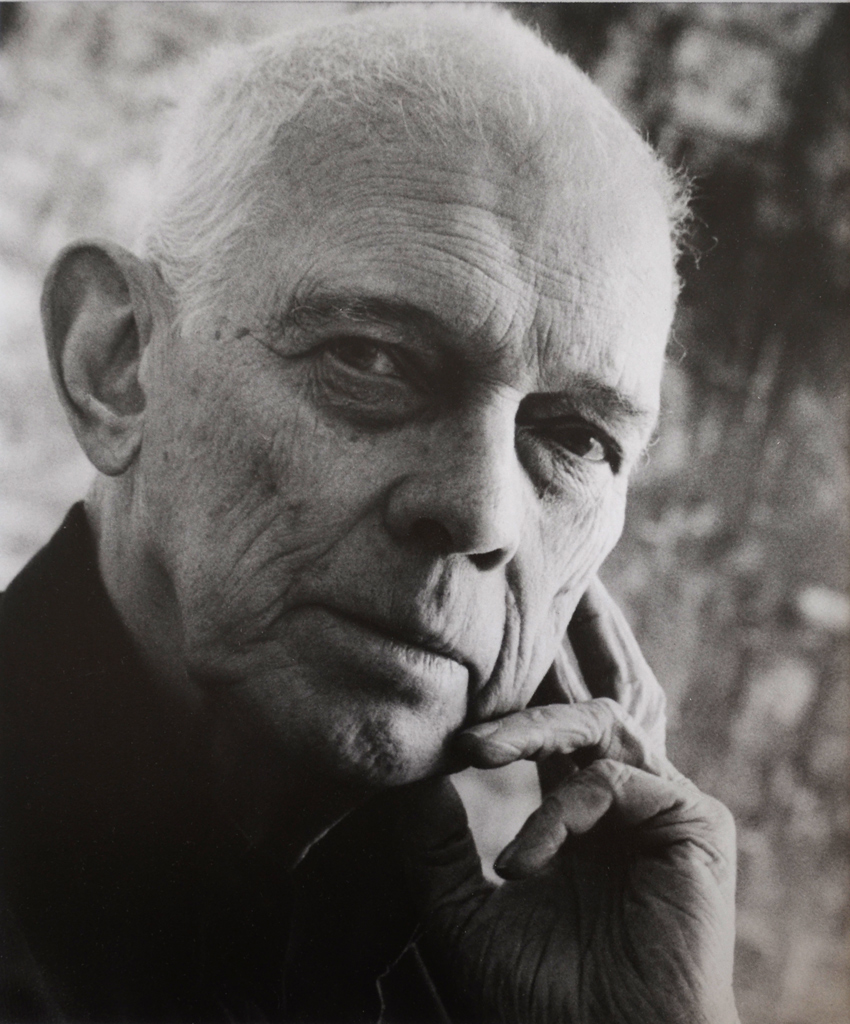
Ivan Medek, Czech journalist, classical music critic, radio broadcaster, signatory of Charter 77

Ivan Medek (July 13, 1925 – January 6, 2010) was a Czech classical music critic, radio broadcaster and journalist. Medek was an important voice of the Czech anti-communist opposition movement, particularly after being forced into exile from Czechoslovakia in 1978. Medek collaborated closely with such Czechoslovak politicians as Václav Havel and Pavel Tigrid in opposition to communist rule.

He was a brother of the Czech painter Mikuláš Medek and the son of the general Rudolf Medek.

Medek was born in Prague, Czechoslovakia, on July 13, 1925. He began his career as both a classical music critic and journalist. He worked as a musician for the Czech Philharmonic until he was fired by the government for his support of the opposition.

Medek was an original signatory of the Charter 77 manifesto in 1977. Persecution by the communist government for his participation in Charter 77 forced Medek into exile in neighboring Austria beginning in 1978. Medek began working at the Voice of America in Austria, where he broadcast news and information into Czechoslovakia. His VoA radio broadcasts became an important link for anti-communist dissidents in his native Czechoslovakia.

Medek returned to Czechoslovakia from exile in 1989 during the Velvet Revolution. In 1993, Medek was appointed to the office of the presidency under Václav Havel, the first president of the Czech Republic. He later became the head of the presidency, or chancellor, under Havel.

Medes had a wife, Helena. He died in Prague on January 6, 2010, at the age of 84.
