= Right Bloc =

Right Bloc Pravý blok
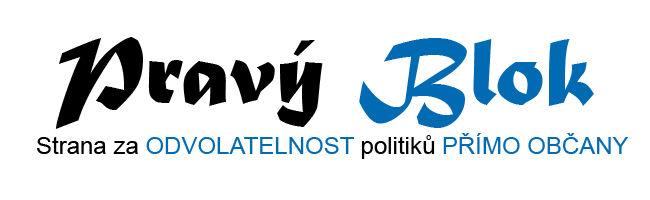
- Leader: Petr Cibulka
- Founded: 1996
- Split from: Democratic Union
- Newspaper: Uncensored news
- Ideology: Anti-communism; Direct democracy Right-wing populism Antiziganism; Russophobia
- Political position: Right-wing
- Colours: Cyan; Blue
- Chamber of Deputies: 0 / 200
- Senate: 0 / 81
- European Parliament: 0 / 21

Website
- cibulka.net

The Right Bloc (Czech: Pravý blok) is a minor Czech political party, founded in 1996 by Petr Cibulka. The party is known for its extremely long official name and for running very old candidates; the party fielded the oldest candidate in every legislative election from 2002 until 2010. The record for the oldest candidate is from the 2002 election, when the party fielded an 87-year-old candidate.

== Name ==
Although the Right Bloc is the original name, several sentences have been added to the official name of the party since then. Cibulka stated that this was done to overcome a press blockade.

The full official name of the party, roughly translated into English, is as follows:

Vote for the Right Bloc - the party for the easy and fast RECALL of politicians and state officials directly by the citizens, for LOW taxes, a BALANCED budget, the MINIMIZATION of bureaucracy, a JUST and UNCORRUPT police force and legal system, PUBLIC REFERENDA and DIRECT democracy WWW.CIBULKA.NET, campaigning with the best anti-criminal program of DIRECT democracy YOU DON'T TRUST THE POLITICIANS AND THEIR JOURNALISTS? FINALLY! LET'S TRUST IN OURSELVES!!! - but even with many other REASONS why we should ALL go to vote this time, but - unless we want to be deceived, cheated and robbed AGAIN - DON'T VOTE for any of the ruling parliamentary parties of this (post)-Communist CZECH-RUSSIAN totalitarian criminal COP-OCRACY and their liquidatory anti-national politics WORSE IS BETTER!!! which asks for electoral support from all Czech citizens and taxpayers who want to change the current criminal situation of which we are all victims into its polar opposite. IN THE STRUGGLE BETWEEN GOOD AND EVIL, TRUTH AND LIES, IT IS IMPOSSIBLE TO BE NEUTRAL AND STILL REMAIN RESPECTABLE!!! For this reason we thank you for your help!!! If you don't believe in humility at the gallows, if our candidate list seems imperfect to you, or if you're missing representatives of your municipality or town on it, and at the same time you HAVE COURAGE in this war of the People of Good against the ruling People of Evil to rise up from their prescribed civic unconsciousness with which they destroy us, and destroy today's DEMOCRATORSHIP, HIDDEN TOTALITARIANISM, and SLAVERY OF A HIGHER DEGREE from the ground up, BECOME ONE OF OUR CANDIDATES!!! Contact: Vote Right Bloc www.cibulka.net, PO BOX 229, 11121 Prague

== History ==
Cibulka founded the party in 1996, as a split from the Democratic Union. Petr Cibulka became party leader, and another prominent member of the party was Jaroslav Anděl, who later became honorary chairman. Anděl ran unsuccessfully in the 1996 Senate election.

In 2002, the party participated in legislative elections for the first time, having been disqualified from the 1998 election for failing to meet requirements. In this election, Jaroslav Anděl became the oldest candidate in the history of the Czech Republic during the election. He was 87 years old. The party has never passed the 5% threshold in any legislative election.

In 2009, the party received 1 per cent of the vote in the European Parliament election, qualifying for state funding.

The party nominated Cibulka as its candidate in the 2013 presidential election, but he was able to collect only 300 signatures of the required 50,000, and did not qualify as a candidate.

In April 2017, the party submitted an incomplete financial report, and the Chamber of Deputies submitted a proposal for the dissolution of the party.

== Election results ==
=== Chamber of Deputies ===
Year	Vote	Vote %	Seats
2002	28,163	0.59	0 / 200
2006	20,382	0.38	0 / 200
2010	24,750	0.47	0 / 200
2013	1,225	0.02	0 / 200
2017	491	0.01	0 / 200
2021	586	0.01	0 / 200
2025	429	0.01	0 / 200

=== European Parliament ===
Election	List leader	Votes	%	Seats	+/−	EP Group
2004	Unclear	27,504	1.18 (#9)	0 / 200	New	−
2009	Unclear	23,612	1.00 (#13)	0 / 200	0	−
2014	Did not contest			0 / 200	0	−
2019	Did not contest			0 / 200	0	−
2024	Petr Cibulka	3,392	0.11 (#24)	0 / 200	0	−
