= Fischer Air =

Czech airline

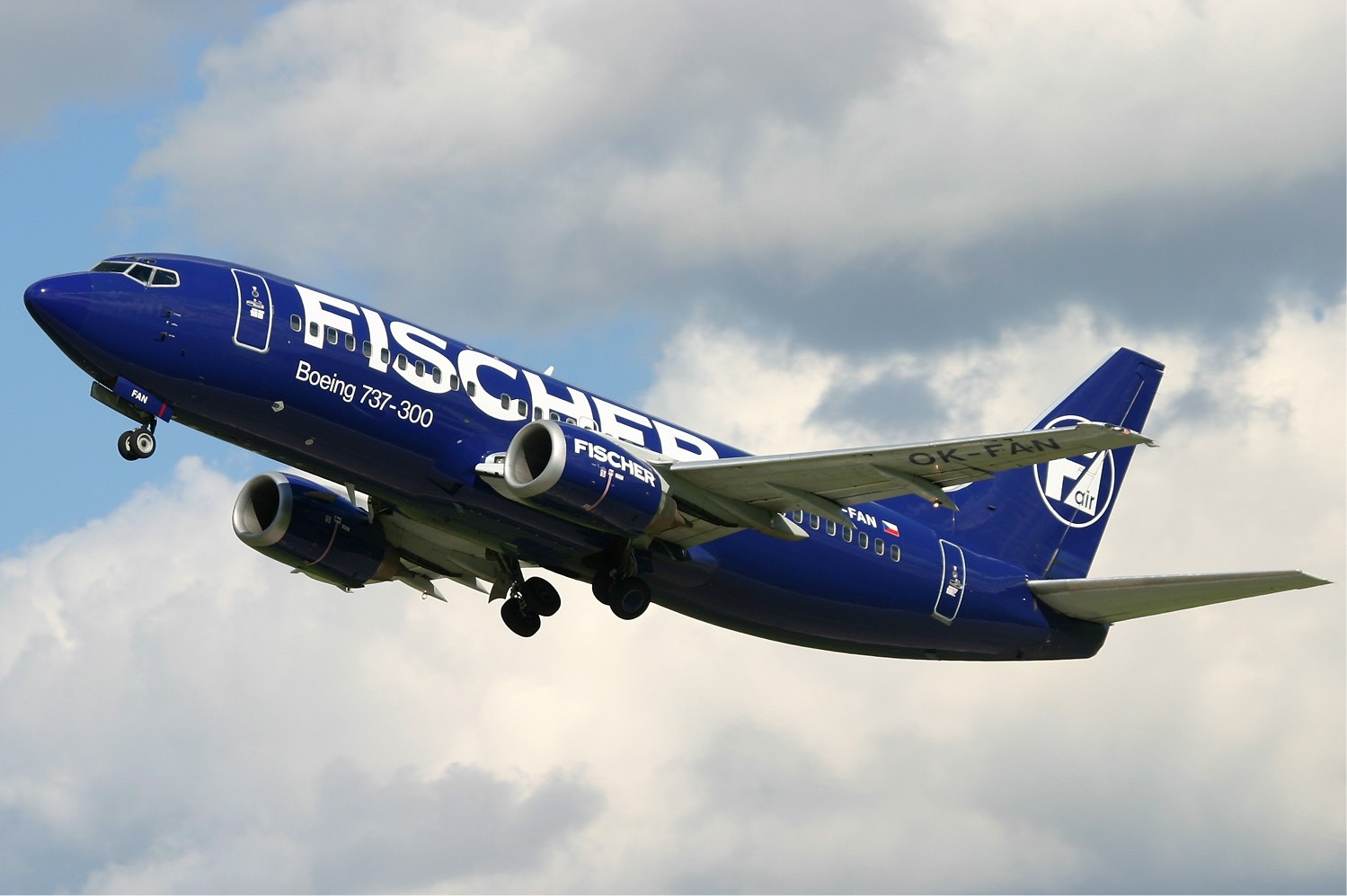
- Boeing 737-300
IATA	ICAO	Call sign
8F	FFR	Fischer
- Founded: 1996
- Ceased operations: 2005
- Operating bases: Ruzyně International Airport
- Fleet size: 3
- Parent company: K&K Capital Group
- Headquarters: Prague, Czech Republic
- Website: fischer.cz

Fischer Air, briefly rebranded Charter Air, was a Czech airline headquartered in Prague and based at Ruzyně International Airport.

== History ==
The airline was established on July 26, 1996. It was owned by the K&K Capital Group (75%) and (25%). Unscheduled operations were started on May 1, 1997. In 2005 it was rebranded Charter Air to avoid confusion with its new Polish charter subsidiary, Fischer Air Polska. Charter Air was not a success as on November 1st it was abolished and at the same time the air carrier went bankrupt.

In October 2018 plans were announced to restart the airline as air FISCHER from April of the following year. However as of October 2019, there were doubts reported about the airline being relaunched at all and it since never materialized after the relaunch had been delayed several times.

== Destinations ==
Fischer Air operated charter services for tour operator Fischer to over 30 destinations in Europe and Africa, as well as charter flights for other clients. It flew to many holiday destinations in the Mediterranean and North Africa, including Sharm el-Sheikh. It also operated a scheduled service to Malta.
