= The Left (Czech Republic) =

Czech political party

The Left Levice
- Leader: Vladimír Farana; Markéta Juřicová
- Founded: 18 February 2020; 6 years ago
- Merger of: Party of Democratic Socialism; Real Left initiative
- Headquarters: Žirovnická 3133/6, 106 00 Prague, Czech Republic
- Ideology: Democratic socialism Post-capitalism; Environmentalism; Anti-capitalism; Antimilitarism
- Political position: Left-wing
- European affiliation: Party of the European Left
- Colours: Red
- Slogan: "For millions of people, not for billionaires"
- Chamber of Deputies: 0 / 200
- Senate: 0 / 81
- European Parliament: 0 / 21

Website
- jsmelevice.cz

The Left (Czech: Levice, Czech pronunciation: [ˈlɛvɪtsɛ]) is a democratic socialist political party in the Czech Republic. The party was founded in 2020 as the result of the merger of the Party of Democratic Socialism and The Real Left initiative.

== History ==
The party aligned with the left-wing movement Budoucnost for the 2025 Czech parliamentary election.

== Ideology ==
The party is critical of the emphasis on economic growth in policy making, arguing that it "takes place regardless of human health, does not serve the development of education and cultural maturity of people, and disrupts the harmony between humans and nature." They state that their long-term political goals are "incompatible with maintaining a capitalist system based on profit maximization", which they seek to overcome using measures "that do not renounce the values of democracy, human rights and individual freedom".

== Election results ==
=== Chamber of Deputies ===
Date	Leader	Votes		Seats			Position
Date	Leader	No.	%	No.	±	Size	Position
2021	Markéta Juřicová	639	0.01	0 / 200	0	21st	Extra-parliamentary
2025	Vladimír Farana; Markéta Juřicová	3,318	0.05	0 / 200	0	21st	Extra-parliamentary

=== Senate ===
Election	First round			Second round			Seats	Total seats	+/–
Election	Votes	%	Place	Votes	%	Place	Seats	Total seats	+/–
2026	1,540	0.13	43th				0 / 27	0 / 81	New

=== European Parliament ===
Election	List leader	Votes	%	Seats	+/−	EP Group
2024	Jan Májíček	2,296	0.08 (#27)	0 / 21	New	−
