= List of prime ministers of the Czech Republic =

Stanislav Rázl was the first Czech head of government

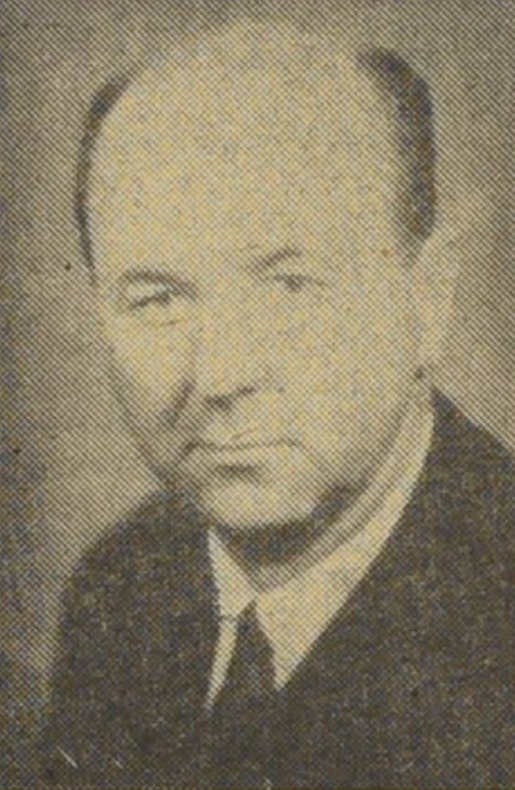
Josef Korčák was the longest serving Czech head of government

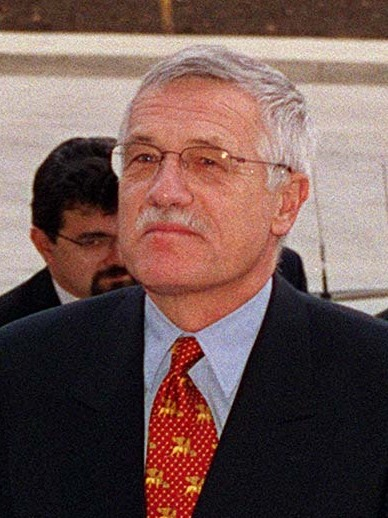
Václav Klaus was the first independent Czech head of government

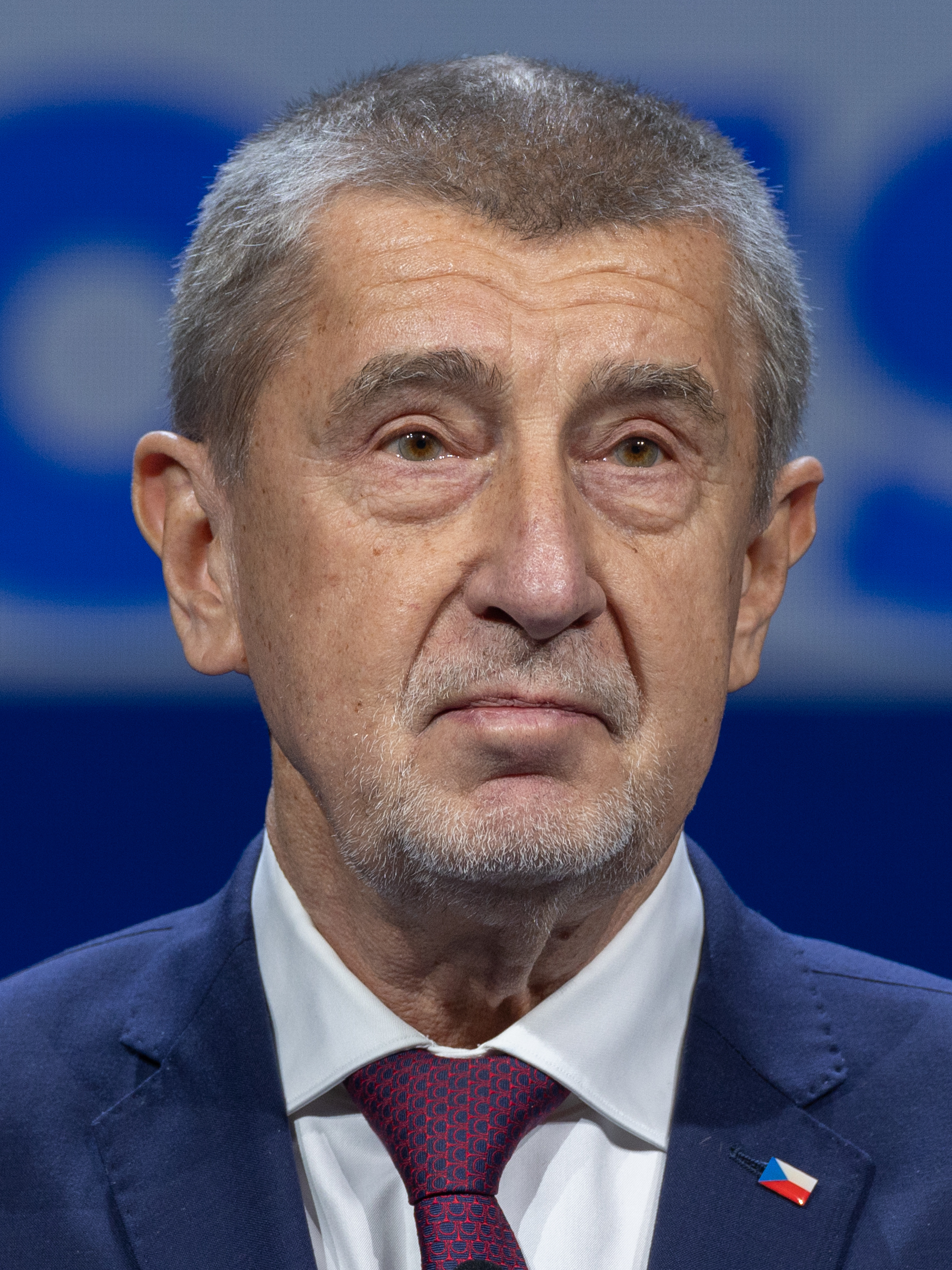
Andrej Babiš is the current prime minister and the only one who held the position in two non-consecutive terms

This is a list of prime ministers of the Czech Republic, a political office that was created in 1993 following the dissolution of Czechoslovakia.

The Czech Republic is a parliamentary representative democracy, with the Prime Minister acting as head of government and the President acting as head of state.

The first Prime Minister of the Czech Republic was Václav Klaus, who served as the second President from 7 March 2003 until 7 March 2013. The current and 14th Prime Minister is Andrej Babiš, leader of ANO 2011, who was appointed by the President on December 9, 2025.

== Czechoslovakia (1918–1992) ==
=== Czech Socialist Republic (1969–1990) ===
1 January 1969 – 5 March 1990: called "Czech Socialist Republic" within Czechoslovakia.

Prime Ministers of the Czech Socialist Republic (Federal part)

Parties:

KSČ (Communist)
OF

No.	Portrait	Name (Birth–Death)	Term of office			Political party	Elected	Cabinet(s)	Composition	Ref.
No.	Portrait	Name (Birth–Death)	Took office	Left office	Time in office	Political party	Elected	Cabinet(s)	Composition	Ref.
1		Stanislav Rázl (1920–1999)	8 January 1969	29 September 1969	264 days	Communist Party of Czechoslovakia	1968	Rázl	KSČ – ČSL – ČSS	
2		Josef Kempný (1920–1996)	29 September 1969	28 January 1970	121 days	Communist Party of Czechoslovakia	—	Kempný	KSČ – ČSL – ČSS	
3		Josef Korčák (1921–2008)	28 January 1970	20 March 1987	17 years, 51 days	Communist Party of Czechoslovakia	—	Korčák I	KSČ – ČSL – ČSS	
3		Josef Korčák (1921–2008)	28 January 1970	20 March 1987	17 years, 51 days	Communist Party of Czechoslovakia	1971	Korčák II	KSČ – ČSL – ČSS	
3		Josef Korčák (1921–2008)	28 January 1970	20 March 1987	17 years, 51 days	Communist Party of Czechoslovakia	1976	Korčák III	KSČ – ČSL – ČSS	
3		Josef Korčák (1921–2008)	28 January 1970	20 March 1987	17 years, 51 days	Communist Party of Czechoslovakia	1981	Korčák IV	KSČ – ČSL – ČSS	
3		Josef Korčák (1921–2008)	28 January 1970	20 March 1987	17 years, 51 days	Communist Party of Czechoslovakia	1986	Korčák V	KSČ – ČSL – ČSS	
4		Ladislav Adamec (1926–2007)	20 March 1987	12 October 1988	1 year, 206 days	Communist Party of Czechoslovakia	—	Adamec	KSČ – ČSL – ČSS	
5		František Pitra (1932–2018)	12 October 1988	6 February 1990	1 year, 117 days	Communist Party of Czechoslovakia	—	Pitra	KSČ – ČSL – ČSS; KSČ – OF – ČSL – ČSS	
6		Petr Pithart (born 1941)	6 February 1990	6 March 1990	28 days	Civic Forum	—	Pithart I	KSČ – OF – ČSL – ČSS	

=== Czech and Slovak Federative Republic (1990–1992) ===
6 March 1990 – 31 December 1992: called "Czech Republic" within Czechoslovakia.

Prime Ministers of the Czech Republic (Federal part)

Parties:

OF
OH (Social-liberal)
ODS (Liberal-conservative)

No.	Portrait	Name (Birth–Death)	Term of office			Political party	Elected	Cabinet(s)	Composition	Ref.
No.	Portrait	Name (Birth–Death)	Took office	Left office	Time in office	Political party	Elected	Cabinet(s)	Composition	Ref.
6		Petr Pithart (born 1941)	6 March 1990	2 July 1992	2 years, 118 days	Civic Forum	1986	Pithart I	KSČ – OF – ČSL – ČSS	
6		Petr Pithart (born 1941)	6 March 1990	2 July 1992	2 years, 118 days	Civic Forum	1990	Pithart II	OF – HSD-SMS – KDU	
6		Petr Pithart (born 1941)	6 March 1990	2 July 1992	2 years, 118 days	Civic Movement	1990	Pithart II	OH – ODS – HSD-SMS – KDU	
7		Václav Klaus (born 1941)	2 July 1992	31 December 1992	182 days	Civic Democratic Party	1992	Klaus I	ODS – KDU-ČSL – ODA – KDS	

== Czech Republic (1993–present) ==
From 1 January 1993 after the dissolution of Czechoslovakia.

Prime Ministers of the Czech Republic

Parties:

ODS (Liberal-conservative)
ČSSD (Social democratic)
ANO (Populist)
Independent

No.	Portrait	Name (Birth–Death)	Term of office			Political party	Elected	Cabinet(s)	Composition	Ref.
No.	Portrait	Name (Birth–Death)	Took office	Left office	Time in office	Political party	Elected	Cabinet(s)	Composition	Ref.
1		Václav Klaus (born 1941)	1 January 1993	2 January 1998	5 years, 1 day	Civic Democratic Party	—	Klaus I	ODS – KDU-ČSL – ODA – KDS	
1		Václav Klaus (born 1941)	1 January 1993	2 January 1998	5 years, 1 day	Civic Democratic Party	1996	Klaus II	ODS – KDU-ČSL – ODA	
2		Josef Tošovský (born 1950)	2 January 1998	22 July 1998	201 days	Independent	—	Tošovský	ODS (Note: Later replaced by US) – KDU-ČSL – ODA	
3		Miloš Zeman (born 1944)	22 July 1998	15 July 2002	3 years, 358 days	Czech Social Democratic Party	1998	Zeman	ČSSD	
4		Vladimír Špidla (born 1951)	15 July 2002	4 August 2004	2 years, 20 days	Czech Social Democratic Party	2002	Špidla	ČSSD – KDU-ČSL – US–DEU	
5		Stanislav Gross (1969–2015)	4 August 2004	25 April 2005	264 days	Czech Social Democratic Party	—	Gross	ČSSD – KDU-ČSL – US–DEU	
6		Jiří Paroubek (born 1952)	25 April 2005	4 September 2006	1 year, 132 days	Czech Social Democratic Party	—	Paroubek	ČSSD – KDU-ČSL – US–DEU	
7		Mirek Topolánek (born 1956)	4 September 2006	8 May 2009	2 years, 246 days	Civic Democratic Party	2006	Topolánek I	ODS	
7		Mirek Topolánek (born 1956)	4 September 2006	8 May 2009	2 years, 246 days	Civic Democratic Party	—	Topolánek II	ODS – KDU-ČSL – SZ	
8		Jan Fischer (born 1951)	8 May 2009	13 July 2010	1 year, 66 days	Independent	—	Fischer	ODS – ČSSD – SZ	
9		Petr Nečas (born 1964)	13 July 2010	10 July 2013	2 years, 362 days	Civic Democratic Party	2010	Nečas	ODS – TOP 09 – VV (Note: Later replaced by LIDEM)	
10		Jiří Rusnok (born 1960)	10 July 2013	29 January 2014	203 days	Independent	—	Rusnok	ČSSD (Note: Exited cabinet August 2013.) – KDU-ČSL	
11		Bohuslav Sobotka (born 1971)	29 January 2014	13 December 2017	3 years, 318 days	Czech Social Democratic Party	2013	Sobotka	ČSSD – ANO 2011 – KDU-ČSL	
12		Andrej Babiš (born 1954)	13 December 2017	17 December 2021	4 years, 4 days	ANO 2011	2017	Babiš I	ANO 2011	
12		Andrej Babiš (born 1954)	13 December 2017	17 December 2021	4 years, 4 days	ANO 2011	—	Babiš II	ANO 2011 – ČSSD	
13		Petr Fiala (born 1964)	17 December 2021	15 December 2025	3 years, 363 days	Civic Democratic Party	2021	Fiala	Spolu (ODS – KDU-ČSL – TOP 09); PirStan (STAN – Pirates (Note: Pirates exited cabinet))	
(12)		Andrej Babiš (born 1954)	15 December 2025	Incumbent	308 days	ANO 2011	2025	Babiš III	ANO 2011 – SPD – AUTO	

== Timeline ==
This is a graphical lifespan timeline of the prime ministers of the Czech Republic. They are listed in order of first assuming office.

The following chart lists prime ministers by lifespan (living prime ministers on the green line), with the years outside of their tenure in beige. Prime ministers with an unknown birth date or death date are shown with only their tenure or their earlier or later life.

The following chart shows prime ministers by their age (living prime ministers in green), with the years of their tenure in blue. Prime ministers with an unknown birth or death date are excluded. The vertical black line at 21 years indicates the minimum age to be prime minister through election in the Chamber of Deputies.

== See also ==
- List of rulers of Bohemia
- List of presidents of Czechoslovakia
- List of prime ministers of Czechoslovakia
- List of rulers of the Protectorate Bohemia and Moravia
- List of presidents of the Czech Republic
- Lists of incumbents
