= List of elections in the Czech Republic =

This is an overview of all elections and referendums held in the Czech Republic since the first time in 1968.

== List ==
Year	Date	Election	Direct/Indirect	Notes
1968	10 June and 21 November	Legislative election	Indirect	The first legislative election
1971	26–27 November	Legislative election	Direct	The first direct legislative election
1976	22–23 October	Legislative election	Direct	
1981	5–6 June	Legislative election	Direct	
1986	23–24 May	Legislative election	Direct	
1990	8–9 June	Legislative election	Direct	The first elections after the Velvet Revolution.
1990	23–24 November	Municipal elections	Direct	
1992	5–6 June	Legislative election	Direct	
1993	26 January	Presidential election	Indirect	The first presidential election
1994	18–19 November	Municipal elections	Direct	
1996	31 May - 1 June	Legislative election	Direct	
1996	15–16 November and 22–23 November	Senate election	Direct	The first Senate election
1998	20 January	Presidential election	Indirect	
1998	19–20 June	Legislative election	Direct	Snap election
1998	13–14 November and 20–21 November	Senate election	Direct	
1999	27 and 28 August	Prague 1 Senate by-election	Direct	
2000	12 November	Regional elections	Direct	The first regional election
2000	12 November	Senate election	Direct	
2002	14–15 June	Legislative election	Direct	
2002	25–26 October	Legislative election	Direct	
2003	15, 24 January & 28 February	Presidential election	Indirect	
2003	13–14 June	European Union membership referendum	Direct	
2003	30 October-1 November and 7–8 November	Czech Senate by-elections	Direct	
2004	11–12 June	European Parliament election	Direct	
2004	8-9 and 17–18 October	Senate by-elections	Direct	
2004	5–6 November	Regional elections	Direct	
2004	5–6 November and 12–13 November	Senate election	Direct	
2006	2–3 June	Legislative election	Direct	
2006	20–21 October	Municipal elections	Direct	
2006	20–21 October and 27–28 October	Senate election	Direct	
2007	13-14 and 27–28 April	Senate by-elections	Direct	
2008	8–9 February	Presidential election	Indirect	
2008	17–18 October	Regional elections	Direct	
2008	17–18 October and 24–25 October	Senate election	Direct	
2009	5 June	European Parliament election	Direct	
2010	28–29 May	Legislative election	Direct	
2010	15–16 October	Municipal elections	Direct	
2010	15–16 October and 22–23 October	Senate election	Direct	
2011	18–19 and 25–26 March	Kladno Senate by-election	Direct	
2012	12–13 October	Regional elections	Direct	
2012	12–13 October and 19–20 October	Senate election	Direct	
2013	11–12 January and 25–26 January	Presidential election	Direct	The first direct presidential election
2013	25–26 October	Legislative election	Direct	
2014	10-11 and 17–18 January	Zlín Senate by-election	Direct	
2014	24 and 25 May	European Parliament election	Direct	
2014	10–11 October	Municipal election	Direct	
2014	19-20 and 16–17 September	Prague 10 Senate by-election	Direct	
2014	10–11 October 2014 and 17–18 October	Senate election	Direct	
2016	7–8 October	Regional elections	Direct	
2016	7–8 October 2016 and 14–15 October	Senate election	Direct	
2017	27–28 January	Most Senate election re-run	Direct	
2017	20–21 October	Legislative election	Direct	
2018	12–13 January and 26–27 January	Presidential election	Direct	
