= Petr Pithart's Cabinet =

- 7th Cabinet of Czech Republic (Czechoslovakia)
- 29 June 1990 - 2 July 1992
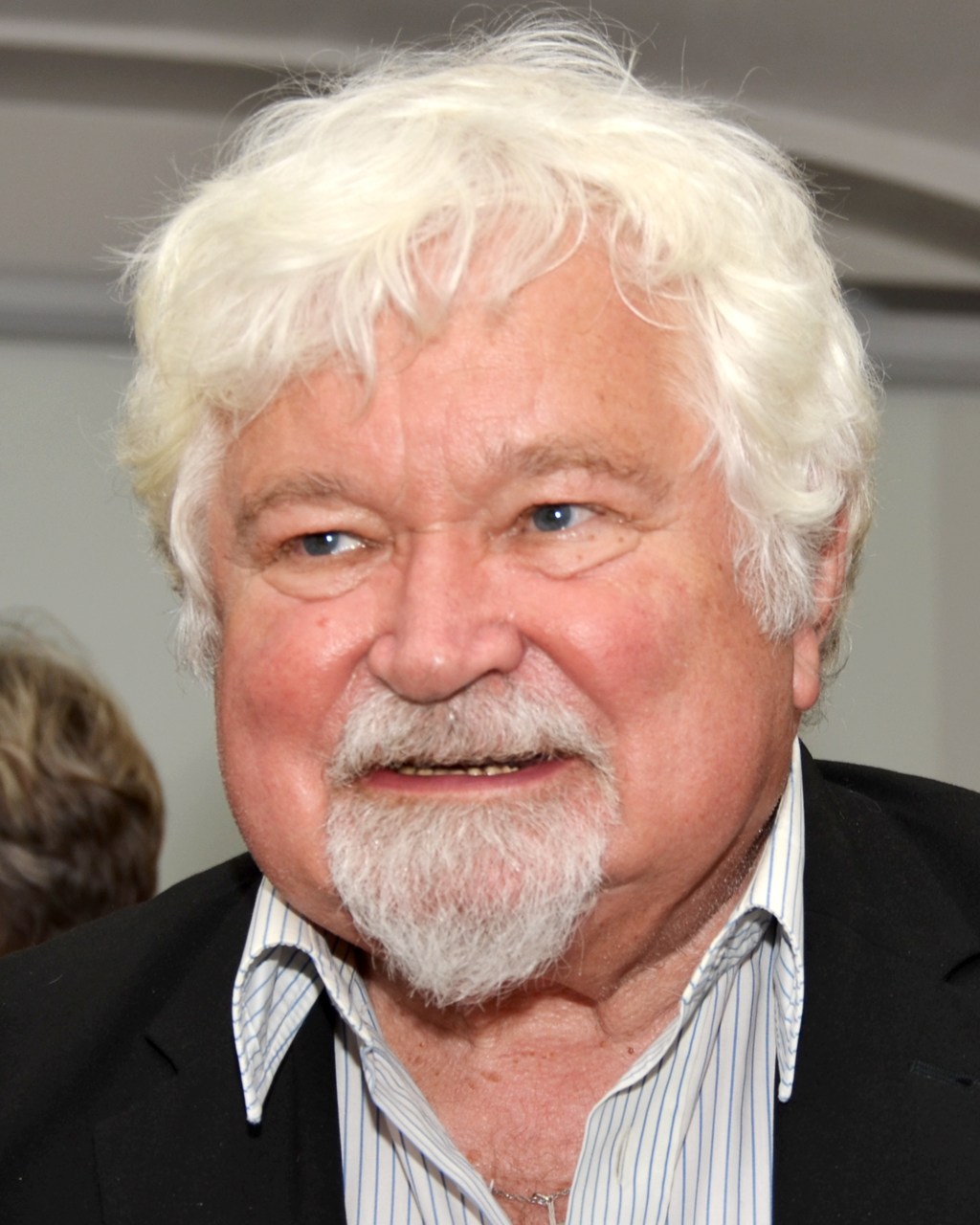
- Date formed: 29 June 1990
- Date dissolved: 2 July 1992

People and organisations
- Head of state: Václav Havel
- Head of government: Petr Pithart
- No. of ministers: 21
- Member party: Civic Forum; Civic Movement; Civic Democratic Party; Civic Democratic Alliance; KDU-ČSL; Movement for Autonomous Democracy–Party for Moravia and Silesia
- Status in legislature: Supermajority (coalition)
- Opposition party: Communist Party of Czechoslovakia
- Opposition leader: Jiří Machalík; Jiří Svoboda

History
- Election: 1990 Czech legislative election
- Incoming formation: 1990
- Outgoing formation: 1992
- Predecessor: Cabinet of Josef Korčák, Ladislav Adamec, František Pitra and Petr Pithart
- Successor: First Cabinet of Václav Klaus

Petr Pithart's Cabinet was in power from 29 June 1990 to 2 July 1992. It was the first Czech government formed after democratic election. It originally consisted of Civic Forum (OF), Christian and Democratic Union (KDU-ČSL), Christian Democratic Party (KDS) and Movement for Autonomous Democracy–Party for Moravia and Silesia (HSD-SMS). Civic Forum was dissolved in 1991 and replaced by Civic Movement (OH) and Civic Democratic Party (ODS).

== Government ministers ==
Portfolio	Name	Political party	In Office
Prime Minister	Petr Pithart	OF, later OH	29 June 1990 – 2 July 1992
Deputy Prime Minister	Milan Lukeš	OF, later OH	29 June 1990 – 2 July 1992
Deputy Prime Minister	František Vlasák	OF	29 June 1990 – 31 May 1991
Deputy Prime Minister	Antonín Baudyš	KDU-ČSL	29 June 1990 – 2 July 1992
Deputy Prime Minister	Jan Stráský	ODS	1 June 1991 – 2 July 1992
Minister of Finances	Karel Špaček	OF, later OH	29 June 1990 – 2 July 1992
Minister of Justice	Leon Richter	Independent, later OH	29 June 1990 – 8 January 1992
Minister of Justice	Jiří Novák	ODS	8 January 1992 – 2 July 1992
Minister of Environment	Bedřich Moldan	OF later ODS	29 June 1990 – 24 January 1991
Minister of Environment	Ivan Dejmal	KDS	24 January 1991 – 2 July 1992
Minister of Industry	Jan Vrba	Independent, later OH	29 June 1990 – 2 July 1992
Minister of Trade and Travel	Vlasta Štěpová	OF, later OH	29 June 1990 – 2 July 1992
Minister of Agriculture	Bohumil Kubát	OF, later ODA	29 June 1990 – 2 July 1992
Minister of Education	Petr Vopěnka	KDS	29 June 1990 – 2 July 1992
Minister of Interior	Tomáš Hradílek	OF	29 June 1990 – 15 November 1990
Minister of Interior	Tomáš Sokol	OF, later OH	15 November 1990 – 2 July 1992
Minister of Labour and Social Affairs	Milan Horálek	OF, later OH	29 June 1990 – 2 July 1992
Minister of Health	Martin Bojar	OF, later OH	29 June 1990 – 2 July 1992
Minister of Culture	Milan Uhde	OF, later ODS	29 June 1990 – 2 July 1992
Minister of Construction Industry	Ludvík Motyčka	KDU-ČSL	29 June 1990 – 2 July 1992
Ministry of State Control	Bohumil Tichý	HSD-SMS	29 June 1990 – 27 February 1991
Ministry of State Control	Igor Němec	ODS	27 February 1991 – 2 July 1992
Minister of the Administration of National Property and its Privatization	Tomáš Ježek	OF, later ODA	29 June 1990 – 2 July 1992
Minister of Mechanical Engineering and Electrical Engineering	Miroslav Grégr	Independent	29 June 1990 – 2 July 1992
Minister of Economic Policy and Development	Karel Dyba	OF, later ODS	29 June 1990 – 2 July 1992
Minister without portfolio	Jaroslav Šabata	OF, later OH	29 June 1990 – 2 July 1992
