= Cabinet of Josef Korčák, Ladislav Adamec, František Pitra and Petr Pithart =

- 6th Cabinet of Czech Republic (Czechoslovakia)
- 18 June 1986 - 29 June 1990
- Date formed: 18 June 1986
- Date dissolved: 29 June 1990

People and organisations
- Head of state: Gustáv Husák; Václav Havel
- Head of government: Josef Korčák; Ladislav Adamec; František Pitra; Petr Pithart
- No. of ministers: 21
- Member party: Civic Forum; ČSL; ČSS; KSČ

History
- Election: 1986 Czech legislative election
- Incoming formation: 1986
- Outgoing formation: 1990
- Predecessor: Josef Korčák's Fourth Cabinet
- Successor: Petr Pithart's Cabinet

Josef Korčák's, Ladislav Adamec's, František Pitra's and Petr Pithart's Cabinet was in power from 18 June 1986 to 29 June 1990.

== Government ministers ==
Portfolio	Name	Political party	In Office
Prime Minister	Josef Korčák	KSČ	18 June 1986 – 20 March 1987
Prime Minister	Ladislav Adamec	KSČ	20 March 1987 – 12 October 1988
Prime Minister	František Pitra	KSČ	12 October 1988 – 5 February 1990
Prime Minister	Petr Pithart	OF	6 February 1990 – 29 June 1990
Deputy Prime Minister	Ladislav Adamec	KSČ	18 June 1986 – 20 March 1987
Deputy Prime Minister	Zdeněk Horčík	KSČ	20 March 1987 – 21 April 1988
Deputy Prime Minister	Jaroslav Tlapák	KSČ	18 June 1986 – 5 December 1989
Deputy Prime Minister	Antonín Baudyš	ČSL	5 December 1989 – 29 June 1990
Deputy Prime Minister	Petr Mišoň	ČSS	5 December 1989 – 29 June 1990
Deputy Prime Minister	Antonín Hrazdíra	KSČ	6 February 1990 – 29 June 1990
Deputy Prime Minister; Chairman of the Czech Planning Commission	Zdeněk Krč	KSČ	18 June 1986 – 21 December 1987
Deputy Prime Minister; Chairman of the Czech Planning Commission	Bohumil Urban	KSČ	21 December 1987 – 21 April 1988
Deputy Prime Minister; Chairman of the Czech Commission for Scientific, Technical and Investment Development	František Šrámek	KSČ	18 June 1986 – 8 May 1987
Deputy Prime Minister; Chairman of the Czech Commission for Scientific, Technical and Investment Development	Rudolf Hegenbart	KSČ	8 May 1987 – 21 April 1988
Deputy Prime Minister; Chairman of the Czech Commission for Planning and Scientific and Technological Development	Bohumil Urban	KSČ	21 April 1988 – 12 October 1988
Deputy Prime Minister; Chairman of the Czech Commission for Planning and Scientific and Technological Development	Miroslav Toman	KSČ	12 October 1988 – 6 February 1990
Deputy Prime Minister; Chairman of the Czech Commission for Planning and Scientific and Technological Development	František Vlasák	Independent	6 February 1990 – 29 June 1990
Minister of Finances	Jiří Nikodým	KSČ	18 June 1986 – 29 June 1990
Minister of Labour and Social Affairs	Nasťa Baumruková	KSČ	18 June 1986 – 21 April 1988
Minister of Education	Milan Vondruška	KSČ	18 June 1986 – 8 May 1987
Minister of Education	Karel Juliš	KSČ	8 May 1987 – 12 October 1988
Minister of Education	Jana Synková	KSČ	12 October 1988 – 5 December 1989
Minister of Education	Milan Adam	ČSS	5 December 1989 – 29 June 1990
Minister of Culture	Milan Klusák	KSČ	18 June 1986 – 21 April 1988
Minister of Culture	Milan Kymlička	KSČ	21 April 1988 – 5 December 1989
Minister of Culture	Milan Lukeš	KSČ	5 December 1989 – 29 June 1990
Minister of Health	Jaroslav Prokopec	KSČ	18 June 1986 – 5 December 1989
Minister of Health	Pavel Klener	OF	5 December 1989 – 29 June 1990
Minister of Justice	Antonín Kašpar	KSČ	18 June 1986 – 5 December 1989
Minister of Justice	Dagmar Burešová	OF	5 December 1989 – 29 June 1990
Minister of Interior	Josef Jung	KSČ	18 June 1986 – 21 April 1988
Minister of Interior	Václav Jireček	KSČ	21 April 1988 – 5 December 1989
Minister of Interior	Antonín Hrazdíra	KSČ	5 December 1989 – 29 June 1990
Minister of Industry	Petr Hojer	KSČ	18 June 1986 – 29 June 1990
Minister of Construction and Civil Engineering	Karel Polák	KSČ	18 June 1986 – 8 May 1987
Minister of Construction and Civil Engineering	Jaroslav Vávra	KSČ	8 May 1987 – 5 December 1989
Minister of Construction and Civil Engineering	Ludvík Motyčka	ČSL	5 December 1989 – 29 June 1990
Minister of Agriculture	Ondřej Vaněk	KSČ	18 June 1986 – 5 December 1989
Minister of Agriculture	Jan Vodehnal	KSČ	5 December 1989 – 29 June 1990
Minister of water and forest management	František Kalina	KSČ	18 June 1986 – 12 October 1988
Minister of water and forest management	Jaroslav Boček	KSČ	12 October 1988 – 29 June 1990
Minister of Trade and Travel	Josef Ráb	KSČ	18 June 1986 – 28 March 1989
Minister of Trade and Travel	Karel Erbes	KSČ	28 March 1989 – 5 December 1989
Minister of Trade and Travel	Vlasta Štěpová	OF	5 December 1989 – 29 June 1990
Minister of Environment	Bedřich Moldan	OF	19 December 1989 – 29 June 1990
Minister without portfolio	Vladimír Šimek	ČSL	18 June 1986 – 12 October 1988
Minister without portfolio	Erich Sýkora	ČSL	12 October 1988 – 5 December 1989
Minister without portfolio	Karel Löbl	ČSS	18 June 1986 – 5 December 1989
Minister without portfolio	Bedřich Moldan	OF	5 December 1989 – 19 December 1989
Minister; Chairman of the People's Control Committee	Jan Motl	KSČ	18 June 1986 – 5 December 1989
Minister; Chairman of the People's Control Committee	Stanislav Kukrál	Independent	5 December 1989 – 8 January 1990
Minister; Chairman of the People's Control Committee	Jitka Zetková	KSČ	6 February 1990 – 29 June 1990
