= 1990 Brno municipal election =

22–23 November 1990	1994 →

All 60 seats in the Assembly 31 seats needed for a majority

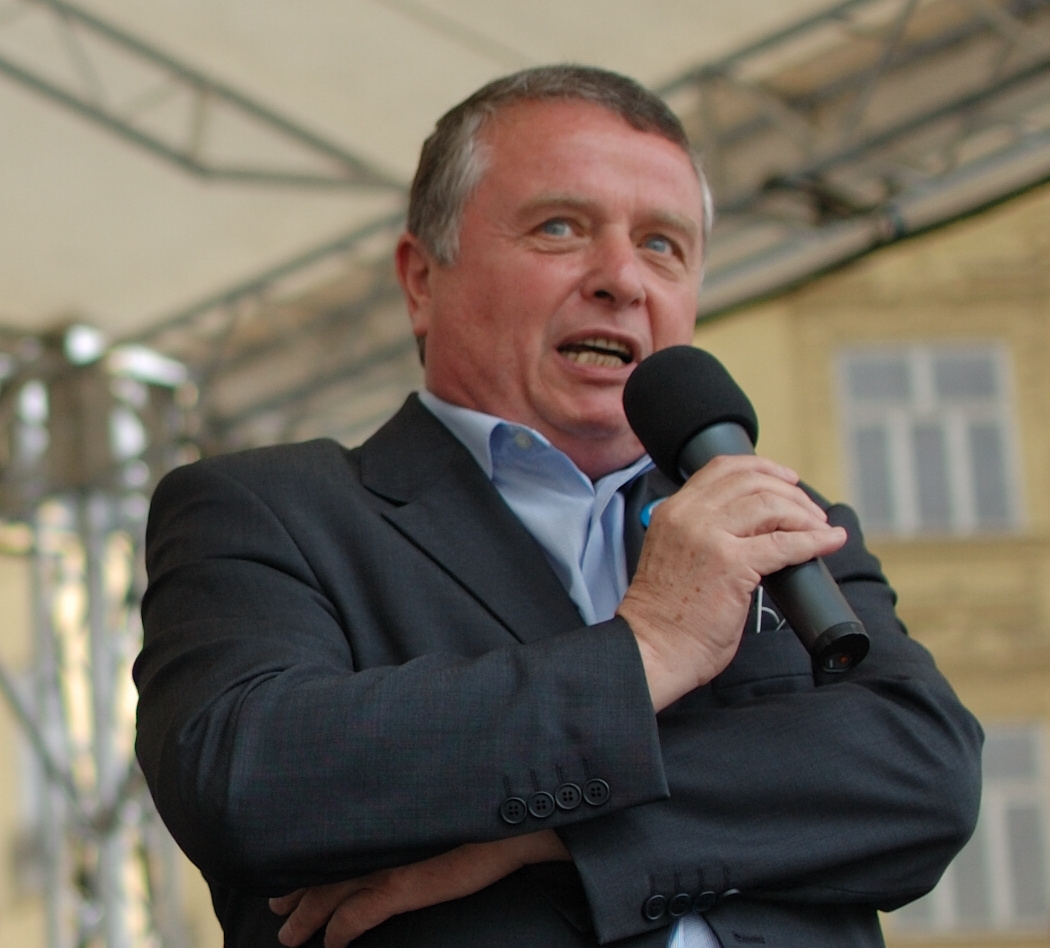

	First party	Second party	Third party
Leader	Zdeněk Tichý		Václav Mencl
Party	HSD–SMS	OF	Association for Brno
Seats won	19	11	7
Popular vote	688,451	342,659	337,871
Percentage	30.9%	15.4%	15.2%
	Fourth party	Fifth party	Sixth party
Leader	Daniel Rychnovský		Helena Sýkorová
Party	KSČM	ČSSD	Lidovci
Alliance		Moravian Democratic Bloc
Seats won	6	3	6
Popular vote	246,690	223 202	214,493
Percentage	11.1%	10.0%	9.6%
Mayor before election
Pavel Podsedník
ČSS
Elected mayor
Václav Mencl
Association for Brno

Municipal election in Brno was held as part of Czech municipal elections in 1990. Movement for Autonomous Democracy–Party for Moravia and Silesia received highest number of votes but remained in opposition. Civic Forum formed the new council and leader of Association for Brno Václav Mencl became new Mayor.

== Result ==
Party	Vote	%Vote	Seats
Movement for Autonomous Democracy–Party for Moravia and Silesia	688,451	30.90	19
Civic Forum	342,659	15.38	11
Association for Brno	337,871	15.17	7
Communist Party of Czechoslovakia	246,690	11.07	6
Moravian Democratic Bloc (ČSSD, ČSS, LDS, SZ)	223,202	10.02	6
Czechoslovak People's Party	214,493	9.63	6
Right Bloc (KDS, RS-SB)	93,571	4.20	4
Radical Republican party	22,607	1.01	0
Moravian National Party	20,050	0.90	0
Democratic Union for Health and Sport	17,726	0.80	0
Coalition for Republic – Republican Party of Czechoslovakia	15,330	0.69	0
Independent Candidates	5,003	0.22	0
