= Cabinet of Josef Kempný and Josef Korčák =

Government of the Czech National Council

Government of Josef Kempný and Josef Korčák
- Date formed: 29 September 1969
- Date dissolved: 9 December 1971

People and organisations
- Head of state: Ludvík Svoboda
- Head of government: Josef Kempný and Josef Korčák
- No. of ministers: 21–22
- Member party: Communist Party of Czechoslovakia; KDU-ČSL; Czechoslovak Social Democracy

History
- Successor: Government of Josef Kempný and Josef Korčák

The government of Josef Kempný and Josef Korčák of the Czech Socialist Republic operated from 29 September 1969, to 9 December 1971. On 28 January 1970, its chairman was replaced and Josef Korčák was appointed to replace Josef Kempný. It was preceded by the government of Stanislav Rázl. It was followed by the second government of Josef Korčák.

== Government ministers ==
Portfolio	Name	Political party	In Office
Prime Minister of CSR	Josef Kempný	KSČ	29 September 1969 – 28 January 1970
Prime Minister of CSR	Josef Korčák	KSČ	28 January 1970 – 9 December 1971
Deputy Prime Minister	Antonín Červinka	KSČ	29 September 1969 – 9 December 1971
Deputy Prime Minister	Ladislav Adamec	KSČ	29 September 1969 – 9 December 1971
Deputy Prime Minister and Minister of Planning	Stanislav Rázl	KSČ	29 September 1969 – 9 December 1971
Minister of Finance	Leopold Lér	KSČ	29 September 1969 – 9 December 1971
Minister of Labor and Social Affairs	Emilian Hamernik	KDU-ČSL	8 January 1969 – 29 September 1969
Minister of Construction and Technology	Karel Löbl	Czech National Social Party	29 September 1969 – 9 December 1971
Minister of Education	Jaromir Hrbek	KSČ	29 September 1969 – 8 July 1971
Minister of Education	Josef Havlin	KSČ	8 July 1971 – 9 December 1971
Minister of Culture	Miloslav Brůžek	KSČ	29 September 1969 – 9 December 1971
Minister of Health	Vladislav Vlček	KDU-ČSL	29 September 1969 – 11 February 1971
Minister of Health	Jaroslav Prokopec	KDU-ČSL	11 February 1971 – 9 December 1971
Minister of Justice	Jan Němec	Czech National Social Party	29 September 1969 – 9 December 1971
Minister of the Interior	Josef Grösser	KSČ	29 September 1969 – 23 October 1970
Minister of the Interior	Josef Jung	KSČ	23 October 1970 – 9 December 1971
Minister of Industry	Josef Šimon	KSČ	29 September 1969 – 3 January 1971
Minister of Industry	Oldřich Svačina	KSČ	3 January 1971 – 9 December 1971
Minister of Construction	František Toman	KDU-ČSL	29 September 1969 – 16 April 1970
Minister of Construction	František Šrámek	KDU-ČSL	16 April 1970 – 9 December 1971
Minister of Agriculture and Nutrition	Josef Černý	KSČ	29 September 1969 – 3 January 1971
Minister of Agriculture and Nutrition	Václav Svoboda	KSČ	3 January 1971 – 9 December 1971
