= Elections in Czechoslovakia =

In Czechoslovakia the first parliamentary elections to the National Assembly were held in 1920, two years after the country came into existence. They followed the adoption of the 1920 constitution. Prior to the elections, a legislature had been formed under the name Revolutionary National Assembly, composed of the Czech deputies elected in 1911 in Cisleithania, Slovak deputies elected in Hungary in 1910 and other co-opted deputies.

== Result ==
=== 1920 Czechoslovak parliamentary election (National Assembly) ===
==== Chamber of Deputies ====
Party	Votes	%	Seats
Czech Social Democratic Party	1,590,520	25.65	74
KDU-ČSL	699,728	11.29	33
German Social Democratic Workers' Party in the Czechoslovak Republic	689,589	11.12	31
Republican Party of Farmers and Peasants	603,618	9.74	28
Czech National Social Party	500,821	8.08	24
Czechoslovak National Democracy	387,552	6.25	19
German National Party–German National Socialist Workers' Party (Czechoslovakia)	328,735	5.30	15
Slovak National Party (historical)	242,045	3.90	12
Farmers' League	241,747	3.90	11
German Christian Social People's Party	212,913	3.43	10
Provincial Christian-Socialist Party	139,355	2.25	5
Czechoslovak Traders' Party	122,813	1.98	6
Hungarian-German Social Democratic Party	108,546	1.75	4
German Liberal Party (Czechoslovakia)	105,449	1.70	5
Associated Jewish Parties (Czechoslovakia)	79,714	1.29	0
Socialist Party of the Czechoslovak Working People	58,580	0.94	3
Party of Smallholders, Homeowners and Entrepreneurs of Czechoslovakia	42,670	0.69	0
Hungarian National Party (Czechoslovakia)	26,520	0.43	1
German Free Social Party	7,630	0.12	0
Independent Party of Small People	5,252	0.08	0
Hungarian National Party	4,214	0.07	0
Slavic Socialist Party	2,024	0.03	0
Total	6,200,035	100.00	281

==== Senate ====
Party	Votes	%	Seats
Czech Social Democratic Party	1,466,958	28.07	41
KDU-ČSL	622,406	11.91	18
German Social Democratic Workers' Party in the Czechoslovak Republic	593,344	11.35	16
Republican Party of Farmers and Peasants	530,388	10.15	14
Czech National Social Party	373,913	7.15	10
Czechoslovak National Democracy	354,561	6.78	10
German National Party–German National Socialist Workers' Party (Czechoslovakia)	300,287	5.75	8
Farmers' League	210,700	4.03	6
Slovak National Party (historical)	181,289	3.47	6
German Christian Social People's Party	141,334	2.70	4
Czechoslovak Traders' Party	107,674	2.06	3
Provincial Christian-Socialist Party	100,658	1.93	2
Associated Jewish Parties (Czechoslovakia)	59,913	1.15	0
Hungarian National Party (Czechoslovakia)	40,302	0.77	1
Party of Smallholders, Homeowners and Entrepreneurs of Czechoslovakia	21,931	0.42	0
German Liberal Party (Czechoslovakia)	21,199	0.41	3
Other German parties	96,904	1.85	3
Socialist Party of the Czechoslovak Working People	3,050	0.06	0
Total	5,226,811	100.00	142

=== 1946 Czechoslovak parliamentary election (Constituent National Assembly) ===
Party	Votes	%	Seats
Communist Party of Czechoslovakia	2,205,697	31.19	93
Czech National Social Party	1,298,980	18.37	55
KDU-ČSL	1,111,009	15.71	46
Democratic Party (Slovakia, 1944)	999,622	14.14	43
Czech Social Democratic Party	855,538	12.10	37
Communist Party of Slovakia (1939)	489,596	6.92	21
Freedom Party (Slovakia)	60,195	0.85	3
Labour Party (Slovakia)	50,079	0.71	2
Total	7,070,716	100.00	300

=== 1948 Czechoslovak parliamentary election (National Assembly) ===
Party or alliance		Votes	%	Seats
National Front (Czechoslovakia)	Communist Party of Czechoslovakia	6,424,734	89.25	160
National Front (Czechoslovakia)	Communist Party of Slovakia (1939)	6,424,734	89.25	54
National Front (Czechoslovakia)	Czech Social Democratic Party	6,424,734	89.25	23
National Front (Czechoslovakia)	KDU-ČSL	6,424,734	89.25	23
National Front (Czechoslovakia)	Czech National Social Party	6,424,734	89.25	23
National Front (Czechoslovakia)	Party of Slovak Revival	6,424,734	89.25	12
National Front (Czechoslovakia)	Freedom Party (Slovakia)	6,424,734	89.25	5
Blank votes		774,032	10.75	0
Total		7,198,766	100.00	300

=== 1971 Czechoslovak parliamentary election (Federal Assembly) ===
==== House of the People ====
Party or alliance		Votes	%	Seats
National Front (Czechoslovakia)	Communist Party of Czechoslovakia	10,153,572	100.00	145
National Front (Czechoslovakia)	Czech National Social Party	10,153,572	100.00	13
National Front (Czechoslovakia)	KDU-ČSL	10,153,572	100.00	8
National Front (Czechoslovakia)	Party of Slovak Revival	10,153,572	100.00	2
National Front (Czechoslovakia)	Freedom Party (Slovakia)	10,153,572	100.00	2
National Front (Czechoslovakia)	Independents	10,153,572	100.00	30
Total		10,153,572	100.00	200

==== House of Nations ====
Party or alliance		Votes	%	Seats
National Front (Czechoslovakia)	Communist Party of Czechoslovakia	10,144,464	100.00	100
National Front (Czechoslovakia)	KDU-ČSL	10,144,464	100.00	8
National Front (Czechoslovakia)	Czech National Social Party	10,144,464	100.00	7
National Front (Czechoslovakia)	Party of Slovak Revival	10,144,464	100.00	2
National Front (Czechoslovakia)	Freedom Party (Slovakia)	10,144,464	100.00	2
National Front (Czechoslovakia)	Independents	10,144,464	100.00	31
Total		10,144,464	100.00	150

== First Czechoslovak Republic (1918–1938) ==
Parliamentary elections in the First Czechoslovak Republic were held in 1920, 1925, 1929 and 1935. The Czechoslovak National Assembly at the time consisted of a Chamber of Deputies (300 members) and a Senate (150 members). Parliamentarians were elected under a proportional representation system using multi-member electoral districts.

== Second Czechoslovak Republic (1938–1939) ==
After the German occupation of Czechoslovakia in 1938, political parties suspended the democratic elements of elections. In the 1938 elections in Slovakia, parties not affiliated with the united list of Hlinka's Slovak People's Party were suspended. The 1938 elections took the form of referendum with the question "Do you want a new, free Slovakia?". No elections took place in the Protectorate of Bohemia and Moravia or the Slovak Republic that existed between 1939 and 1945.

== Third Czechoslovak Republic (1945–1948) ==
The only elections to the Constituent National Assembly were held in 1946, although with a limited number of political parties within the National Front. These were last free elections until 1990, following a 1948 coup.

== Elections in the Czech and Slovak Federative Republic (1990–1992) ==
With the decline of Communism, free elections were again reintroduced in 1990. These elections were held into each chambers of Federal Assembly and into each National Councils of the constituent republics:

- 1990 Czech election
- 1990 Slovak election

After the 1992 parliamentary elections, the victorious parties initiated the dissolution of Czechoslovakia, which took place on 1 January 1993.

== See also ==
- Elections in the Czech Republic
- Elections in Slovakia
