= Zdeněk Hoření =

Czech journalist and politician (1930–2021)

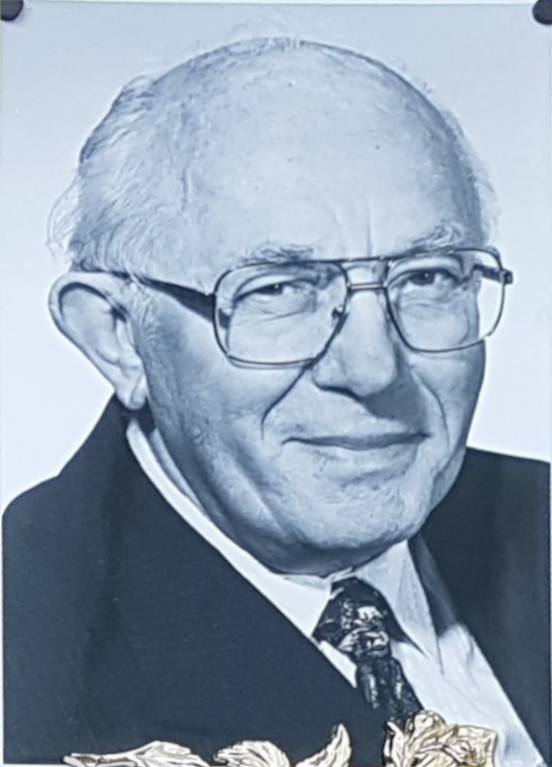

Member of the Czech National Council
- In office 23 October 1976 – 22 May 1986

Member of the Czechoslovak Federal Assembly
- In office 24 May 1986 – 23 January 1990

Personal details
- Born: 9 February 1930 Frýdštejn, First Czechoslovak Republic
- Died: 12 February 2021 (aged 91) Prague, Czech Republic
- Party: KSČ
- Occupation: Journalist

Zdeněk Hoření (9 February 1930 – 12 February 2021) was a Czechoslovak politician and journalist who served as Editor-in-Chief of Rudé právo, the official newspaper of the Communist Party of Czechoslovakia.

== Biography ==
Hoření began working for Rudé právo in 1954 as an editor and served as its Moscow correspondent from 1962 to 1968. In 1969, he became Deputy Editor-in-Chief of the party magazine Tribuna, and subsequently held the same role for Rudé právo. From 1983 until the end of the Velvet Revolution, he held the position of Editor-in-Chief. He had also served as President of the Czechoslovak Union of Journalists. He was awarded the Czechoslovak Journalist Prize in 1980, which allowed him to join the Order of the Republic.

The 15th Congress of the Communist Party of Czechoslovakia elected him to the Central Committee of the party, and he was confirmed by the 16th Congress. From October 1984 to November 1989, he was a member of the secretariat of the Central Committee.

During the 1976 Czech legislative election, he was elected to the Czech National Council. He was re-elected in 1981. For the 1986 Czechoslovak parliamentary election, he moved to the Federal Assembly of Czechoslovakia, winning his bid to represent Constituency No. 64, which contained the cities of Most and Chomutov. He served until his resignation in January 1990 after the Velvet Revolution removed the Communist Party from power.

Following the Velvet Revolution, Hoření withdrew himself from public life. He worked in the editorial office of the communist newspaper Haló noviny, where his daughter, Monika, now works.

Zdeněk Hoření died of COVID-19 during the COVID-19 pandemic in the Czech Republic in Prague on 12 February 2021, at the age of 91, three days after his birthday.
