= Valtr Komárek =

Czech economist, forecaster and politician

Personal details
- Born: 10 August 1930 Hodonín, Czechoslovakia
- Died: 16 May 2013 (aged 82) Prague, Czech Republic

Valtr Komarek (10 August 1930 – 16 May 2013) was a Czech economist, forecaster and politician. A participant in the Velvet Revolution in 1989, Komárek subsequently entered politics a part of the Czech Social Democratic Party (ČSSD), leading the party into elections in 1992, and serving as honorary chairman of the party from March 2011. He also served as First Deputy Minister of National Understanding, and as an MP in the Federal Assembly. He is considered one of the key figures of the Velvet Revolution and post-revolution politics and economics.

== Life ==
Komárek was born in Hodonín to a Jewish family. His parents died during World War II in a concentration camp, but Valtr was placed in foster care and survived the Holocaust. After the war he joined the Communist Party of Czechoslovakia (KSČ).

He graduated from the Economic Institute in Moscow in the 1960s and worked in the State Planning Commission and the economics section of the Politburo of the KSČ Central Committee. From 1964 until 1967 he worked in Cuba as a consultant to Che Guevara. In 1968 he belonged to a group of economists who participated in preparing the economic reforms known as the Prague Spring. He was general secretary of the Economic Council of Czechoslovakia from the beginning of 1968 until 1971, when he was transferred to the federal pricing authority due to his reformist views.

Gradually he returned to higher professional positions. From 1978, Komárek worked as a researcher at the Economic Institute of the Czechoslovak Academy of Sciences. From 1984 he was director of the Forecasting Institute of the Czechoslovak Academy, heading a team handling proposals for possible amendments. Other members of the institute included Václav Klaus, Miloš Zeman, Tomáš Ježek, Vladimír Dlouhý, and Miloslav Ransdorf.

In November 1989 he worked with Civic Forum, and was appointed First Vice-President on 10 December 1989 in Marián Čalfa Government of National Unity. From April until June 1990 he was Deputy Prime Minister. Initially one of the most popular economic ministers in government, he later lost influence and was omitted from the government after the 1990 elections.

In the 1990 elections he was elected to parliament for Civic Forum, representing the Central Bohemian Region. When Civic Forum disbanded in 1991, he joined ČSSD, leading the party's election campaign in elections in 1992, at which he defended his mandate. He remained in the Federal Assembly until the dissolution of Czechoslovakia, of which he was a strong critic. Following the dissolution, and the abolition of the Forecasting Institute of the Czechoslovak Academy, Komárek withdrew from public life.

From March 2011, he served as honorary chairman of ČSSD. His son Martin Komárek (born 1961) is a journalist and politician.

He died on 16 May 2013 in Prague, following complications from heart surgery. President Miloš Zeman and other political figures described his death as a great loss for Czech society.

== Bibliography (selection) ==
- 1990 - Prognosis and program, Academia.edu, ISBN 80-200-0255-3
- 1991 - Endangered revolution, parallel bars, ISBN 80-7127-044-X
- 2004 - Chronicle of despair and hope, Academia - two parts autobiographical novel, Volume 1 ISBN 80-200-1263-X . Part 2 ISBN 80-200-1389-X

== Awards ==
- 11 August 2010 - He was awarded a Golden Plaque by President Václav Klaus for his contribution to the economic transformation and the social debate about the direction of the Czech economy and politics
- 28 October 2016 - He posthumously received the Tomáš Garrigue Masaryk Order from President Miloš Zeman
