= Stanislav Rázl's Cabinet =

Government of the Czech National Council

Government of Stanislav Rázl
- Date formed: 8 January 1969
- Date dissolved: 29 September 1969

People and organisations
- Head of state: Ludvík Svoboda
- Head of government: Stanislav Rázl
- No. of ministers: 21
- Member party: Communist Party of Czechoslovakia; KDU-ČSL; Czechoslovak Social Democracy

History
- Successor: Government of Josef Kempný and Josef Korčák

This was the first government of the newly established Czech National Council. The Czech National Council was founded in 1968 and became constitutionally active on 1 January 1969. The government of the Czech Socialist Republic, led by Stanislav Rázl, governed from 8 January 1969 to 29 September 1969. Following this government, the administration of Josef Kempný and Josef Korčák took office.

== Government ministers ==
Portfolio	Name	Political party	In Office
Prime Minister of CSR	Stanislav Rázl	KSČ	8 January 1969 – 29 September 1969
Deputy Prime Minister	Antonín Červinka	KSČ	8 January 1969 – 29 September 1969
Deputy Prime Minister	Ladislav Adamec	KSČ	8 January 1969 – 29 September 1969
Minister of Planning	Drahomír Dvořák	KSČ	8 January 1969 – 29 September 1969
Minister of Finance	Leopold Lér	KSČ	8 January 1969 – 29 September 1969
Minister of Labor and Social Affairs	František Toman	KDU-ČSL	8 January 1969 – 29 September 1969
Minister of Construction and Technology	Karel Löbl	Czech National Social Party	8 January 1969 – 29 September 1969
Minister of Education	Vilibald Bezdíček	KSČ	8 January 1969 – 27 August 1969
Minister of Education	Jaromír Hrbek	KSČ	27 August 1969 – 29 September 1969
Minister of Culture	Miroslav Galuška	KSČ	8 January 8 1969 – 10 July 1969
Minister of Culture	Miloslav Brůžek	KSČ	10 July 1969 – 29 September 1969
Minister for Youth and Sports	Emanuel Bosák	KSČ	8 January 1969 – 29 September 1969
Minister of Health	Vladislav Vlček	KDU-ČSL	8 January 1969 – 29 September 1969
Minister of Justice	Václav Hrabal	Czech National Social Party	8 January 1969 – 29 September 1969
Minister of the Interior	Josef Grösser	KSČ	8 January 1969 – 29 September 1969
Minister of Industry	František Čihák	KSČ	8 January 1969 – 29 September 1969
Minister of Construction	František Toman	KDU-ČSL	8 January 1969 – 29 September 1969
Minister of Agriculture and Nutrition	Josef Černý	KSČ	8 January 1969 – 29 September 1969
Minister of Forestry and Water Management	Ladislav Hruzík	KSČ	8 January 1969 – 29 September 1969
Minister of Transport	Josef Starý	KSČ	8 January 1969 – 29 September 1969
Minister of Post and Telecommunications	Růžena Urbánková	KSČ	8 January 1969 – 29 September 1969
Minister of Trade	Miloslav Kohoutek	KSČ	8 January 1969 – 29 September 1969
Minister without Portfolio	František Jaška	KSČ	8 January 1969 – 29 September 1969
