= Tomáš Ježek =

Tomáš Ježek may refer to:

- Tomáš Ježek (economist) (1940–2017), Czech economist, member of parliament, government minister and academic
- Tomáš Ježek (canoeist) (born 1973), Czech flatwater canoer
