= Elections in the Czech Republic =

All elections in the Czech Republic are based on the principle of universal suffrage. Any adult citizen who is at least 18 years old can vote, except those who have been stripped of their legal capacities by a court, usually on the basis of mental illness. Elected representatives are elected directly by the citizens without any intermediaries. Election laws are not part of the constitution, but – unlike regular laws – they cannot be changed without the consensus of both houses of the Parliament. The Czech Republic uses a two-round plurality voting system for the presidential and Senate elections and an open party-list proportional representation system for all other elections.

Elections are usually held over two days, from 14:00 to 22:00 on Friday and then from 8:00 to 14:00 on Saturday.

== System of elections ==
=== Presidential elections ===
Any citizen aged 40 or over can stand for president, unless they have already served two terms in the office or have been found guilty of treason by the Constitutional Court. From 1993 to 2008, presidents were elected by both houses of the Parliament in three rounds of voting. Since the 2013 election the president is elected directly by the people in two rounds, where the top two candidates from the first round face each other again in the second round. Presidents are elected for five-year terms.

=== Chamber of Deputies elections ===
Any citizen aged 21 or over can stand as a candidate for the Chamber of Deputies, which consists of 200 members elected for four-year terms. The Chamber of Deputies elections do not necessarily take place at fixed intervals as the Chamber of Deputies can be prematurely dissolved by the president, under conditions set by the Constitution. The president also decides the date of the elections, thereby starting the official election campaign, during which political parties' spending is capped by the law.

There are 14 voting districts for elections to the Chamber of Deputies, which correspond to the regions of the Czech Republic. Each of these voting districts has a different number of seats available, and parties submit ranked lists of candidates for each district. Candidates of a political party can only win a seat if their party received at least 5% of all valid votes nationally. Voters must choose only one political party to vote for, but they may use up to four preferential votes for particular candidates of that party, which affect the final order of the candidates on the party list. After the elections, the president nominates somebody (usually the head of the winning party) to form a new Cabinet.

=== Senate elections ===
Any citizen aged 40 or over can become a senator. The Senate consists of 81 members, elected for six-year terms. Elections are held every two years, with one third of Senate seats contested each time. The country is divided into 81 senate constituencies with roughly the same number of voters. The elections consist of two rounds, in which the top two candidates from the first round face each other again in the second round. The Senate elections – and especially the second rounds – have had the lowest voter turnouts of all Czech elections.

=== European elections ===
Any citizen aged 21 or over can represent the Czech Republic as a member of the European Parliament. The Czech Republic is assigned 21 out of 720 mandates in the European Parliament. Members of the European Parliament are elected for five-year terms. There is only one constituency and one list of candidates for the entire Czech Republic. Voters must choose one political party to vote for, but can use up to two preferential votes for particular candidates of that party, which affect the final order of the candidates on the party list.

=== Regional elections ===
Any citizen aged 18 or over can become a regional councilor. There are 13 regional councils, one for each region of the Czech Republic except the capital, Prague. The City Council of Prague has a special status and acts as both regional and municipal council. Members of regional councils are elected for four-year terms. Their number varies across the regions from 45 to 65. Candidates of a political party can only win a seat if their party gained at least 5% of all valid votes. Voters must choose one political party to vote for, but they can also use up to four preferential votes for particular candidates of that party, which affect the final order of the candidates on the party list. Voters can only vote in the region where they have registered their permanent address.

Unlike in the case of the national cabinet, there is no individual person nominated to form a new regional cabinet. Whichever coalition forms a majority in the regional council chooses the president of the regional cabinet. Political parties can switch sides, end their support for the current president of the regional council and form a new regional cabinet without the need for early elections.

=== Municipal elections ===
Any citizen aged 18 or over can become a municipal councilor. Municipal councilors are elected for four-year terms. Voters can only vote in the municipality where they have registered their permanent address. The number of councilors for each municipality varies from 5 to 55. Each voter has a number of votes corresponding to the number of seats in that particular municipal council, which can be distributed freely across candidates of all political parties.

For a party to be eligible for representation, the total number of votes for a party divided by the number of seats in the municipal council and multiplied by the number of candidates nominated by that party must exceed 5% of the total number of valid votes cast in the municipality. The number of votes for a candidate of a party in proportion to the number of all votes cast for that party affects the final order of candidates on the party list.

=== Referendums ===
The Constitution of the Czech Republic mentions referendums only in the context of "a referendum concerning the accession of the Czech Republic to the European Union". There are no other provisions concerning referendums. As such, the only state-wide referendum ever held in the Czech Republic was the Czech European Union membership referendum in 2003. The government of the Czech Republic approved a referendum bill in 2005, but it was never passed by the parliament.

== Results of the latest elections ==
=== Latest presidential election ===
Candidate	Party	First round		Second round	
Candidate	Party	Votes	%	Votes	%
Petr Pavel	Independent	1,975,056	35.40	3,359,151	58.33
Andrej Babiš	ANO 2011	1,952,213	34.99	2,400,046	41.67
Danuše Nerudová	Independent	777,080	13.93		
Pavel Fischer	Independent	376,705	6.75		
Jaroslav Bašta	Freedom and Direct Democracy	248,375	4.45		
Marek Hilšer	Marek Hilšer to the Senate	142,912	2.56		
Karel Diviš	Independent	75,475	1.35		
Tomáš Zima	Independent	30,769	0.55		
Total		5,578,585	100.00	5,759,197	100.00
Valid votes		5,578,585	99.21	5,759,197	99.51
Invalid/blank votes		44,227	0.79	28,343	0.49
Total votes		5,622,812	100.00	5,787,540	100.00
Registered voters/turnout		8,245,962	68.19	8,242,566	70.22
Source: Czech Statistical Office

=== Latest Chamber of Deputies election ===
Party	Votes	%	Seats	+/–
ANO 2011	1,940,507	34.52	80	+8
SPOLU	1,313,346	23.36	52	–19
Mayors and Independents	631,512	11.23	22	–11
Czech Pirate Party	504,537	8.97	18	+14
Freedom and Direct Democracy	437,611	7.78	15	–5
Motorists for Themselves	380,601	6.77	13	New
Stačilo!	242,031	4.31	0	0
Přísaha Civic Movement	60,503	1.08	0	0
Generation Movement	25,176	0.45	0	New
Czech Republic in First Place!	12,455	0.22	0	New
Swiss Democracy	12,097	0.22	0	0
Czech Sovereignty of Social Democracy	10,263	0.18	0	0
Voluntia	7,375	0.13	0	New
Koruna Česká	7,313	0.13	0	0
Challenge 2025	6,338	0.11	0	New
Clear Signal of Independents	4,937	0.09	0	New
Rebels	4,185	0.07	0	New
Moravian Land Movement	3,842	0.07	0	0
Movement of Citizens and Entrepreneurs	3,718	0.07	0	New
Volt Czechia	3,639	0.06	0	New
The Left	3,318	0.06	0	0
The State Should Serve	2,881	0.05	0	New
Circle Movement	2,209	0.04	0	New
Balbín's Poetic Party	612	0.01	0	New
Right Bloc	429	0.01	0	0
Urza.cz	282	0.01	0	0
Total	5,621,717	100.00	200	0
Valid votes	5,621,717	98.79		
Invalid/blank votes	68,918	1.21		
Total votes	5,690,635	100.00		
Registered voters/turnout	8,253,316	68.95		
Source: Volby

=== Latest Senate election ===
Party	First round			Second round			Seat totals			
Party	Votes	%	Seats	Votes	%	Seats	Won	Not up	Total	+/–
Civic Democratic Party	140,293	14.07	0	82,377	18.23	5	5	13	18	+3
Mayors and Independents	122,948	12.33	1	104,538	23.13	10	11	8	19	+7
ANO 2011	115,202	11.55	0	39,473	8.74	1	1	4	5	-1
Christian and Democratic Union – Czechoslovak People's Party	82,814	8.30	0	65,397	14.47	3	3	9	12	-3
Czech Social Democratic Party	81,105	8.13	0	18,175	4.02	0	0	3	3	-10
Freedom and Direct Democracy	60,284	6.04	0	–	–	–	0	0	0	0
TOP 09	46,575	4.67	0	33,938	7.51	2	2	3	5	+2
Communist Party of Bohemia and Moravia	40,994	4.11	0	–	–	–	0	0	0	0
Czech Pirate Party	36,717	3.69	0	18,804	4.61	1	1	1	2	+1
Senator 21	32,884	3.30	0	25,071	5.55	2	2	1	3	0
Tricolour Citizens' Movement	25,609	2.57	0	–	–	–	0	0	0	0
Green Party	11,315	1.13	0	8,085	1.79	0	0	1	1	0
Freeholder Party of the Czech Republic	11,213	1.12	0	8,499	1.88	0	0	0	0	-1
Party of Free Citizens	9,297	0,93	0	8,433	1.87	1	1	0	1	+1
Mayors and Personalities for Moravia	7,778	0.78	0	8,723	1.93	0	0	0	0	0
Hradec Králové Democratic Club	7,445	0.75	0	15,138	3.35	1	1	0	1	+1
Severočeši.cz	1,645	0.16	0	–	–	–	0	1	1	0
Marek Hilšer for Senate	916	0.09	0	–	–	–	0	1	1	0
Independents	26,119	2.61	0	–	–	–	0	4	4	0
Invalid or blank votes	24,527	–	–	1,812	–	–	–	–	–	–
Number of registered voters and voter turnout	2,815,827	36.29%	–	2,711,956	16.74%	–	–	–	–	–
Source: Volby.cz

== See also ==
- Electoral calendar
- Electoral system
- List of elections in the Czech Republic
