= Josef Vavroušek =

Czech environmentalist, scientist and politician

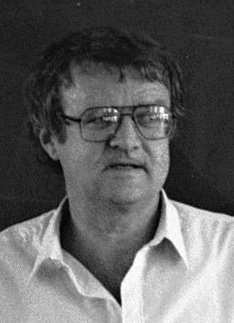
Josef Vavroušek in 1994

Josef Vavroušek (15 September 1944 – 18 March 1995) was a Czech environmentalist, scientist and politician. He was the founder of the Environment for Europe process.

== Life ==
Vavroušek was born on 15 September 1944 in Prague. He obtained his PhD from the Czech Technical University in Prague in 1975, then worked for 15 years (1975–1990) as a scientist in the field of cybernetics, general systems theory, science of science, and human environment, specializing in macro-ecology of Man and environmental policy. During this period, he was a member of the executive body of the Ecological Section of the Biological Society, Czechoslovak Academy of Sciences (1985–1991), one of the founding members of the first executive body of the Circle of Independent Intelligentsia (1988–1989) and a member of the Club of Rome. He was also one of the founders of the Civic Forum and later of the Civic Movement in Czechoslovakia and a member of their executive bodies.

In 1968 he participated in the Lambaréné Student Expedition to the A. Schweitzer Hospital in Lambaréné, Gabon. The expedition's aim, which visited fourteen African countries, was to provide material aid to the hospital and promote Schweitzer's ideals of humanism and respect for life. It was a life experience that largely determined his future life.

He coordinated (with Bedřich Moldan) the translation of Limits to Growth into Czech.

In 1989, Vavroušek was one of the leaders of the Czechoslovak Velvet Revolution. In April 1990, he became vice-chairman of the State Commission for Scientific and Technical Development (responsible for the environment). Then in June 1990 he became the first (and last) Environment Minister of the Federal Government of Czechoslovakia. In this role, Vavroušek proposed and organized the first pan-European conference of environment Ministers.

Josef Vavroušek formulated his "Ten Commandments" of values compatible and incompatible with a sustainable way of life in 1993 and considered it a preliminary proposal. He died in spring 1995 so he could not finish it.

As environment Minister, he headed the Czechoslovak delegation to the Rio Summit in 1992, but then political changes and the country's division brought his ministerial career to a premature end. Returning to science, he joined the Institute of Applied Ecology at Charles University . Then he went on to found and become president of the Society for Sustainable Living (established in October 1992). Vavroušek's contribution to European environmental cooperation was to bring the interdisciplinary experience and understanding of how human systems and the environment work into mainstream political parlance across the new Europe at the time of its birth and to emphasize the importance of human values and environmental ethics in the search for sustainable ways of living. Vavroušek was killed with his daughter Petra by an avalanche on 18 March 1995 while hiking in the Roháče mountains in Western Tatras in Slovakia.

== Bibliography ==
- Vavroušek, J. (1993). Perspektivy lidských hodnot slučitelných s trvale udržitelným způsobem života. In P. Nováček & J. Vavroušek (Eds), Lidské hodnoty a trvale udržitelný způsob života: Sborník přednášek (pp. 91–100). Olomouc, Czech Republic: Vydavatelství Univerzity Palackého.
