= Mass media in Communist Czechoslovakia =

The mass media in Communist Czechoslovakia was controlled by the Communist Party of Czechoslovakia (KSČ). Private ownership of any publication or agency of the mass media was generally forbidden, although churches and other organizations published small periodicals and newspapers. Even with this informational monopoly in the hands of organizations under KSČ control, all publications were reviewed by the government's Office for Press and Information. Censorship was lifted for three months during the 1968 Prague Spring but afterward was reimposed under the terms of the 1966 Press Law. The law states that the Czechoslovak press is to provide complete information, but it must also advance the interests of socialist society and promote the people's socialist awareness of the policy of the communist party as the leading force in society and state.

Government concern about control of the mass media was such that it was illegal to own a duplicating machine or to reproduce more than eleven copies of any printed material. Nevertheless, a fairly wide distribution of underground publications (popularly known as samizdat throughout Eastern Europe and the Soviet Union) that were established during the Nazi occupation continued throughout communist rule into the 1980s.

== Newspapers ==
- The chief newspaper of the KSČ was the Prague daily, Rudé Právo, which, with a circulation of 900,000 in the 1980s, was the most widely read and most influential newspaper in the country. Its editor in 1987 was Zdeněk Hoření, a member of the Secretariat of the KSČ Central Committee.
- Its sister publication, Bratislava's Pravda, was the organ of the KSS.
- Other dailies with large circulations were e. g. Lidová Demokracie, published by the Czechoslovak People's Party (see National Front); Mladá Fronta in Bohemia/ Smena in Slovakia published by the Socialist Union of Youth (see National Front); Práce in Bohemia / Práca in Slovakia published by the Revolutionary Trade Union Movement; Svobodné Slovo, published by the Czechoslovak Socialist Party, and Ľud, published by the Slovak Revival Party.

The Czechoslovak Press Agency (in Czech: Československá tisková kancelář, in Slovak: Československá tlačová kancelária ČTK / ČTK) received a state subsidy and was controlled by the federal government through its Presidium.

== TV and radio ==
The government also controlled several domestic television and radio networks. Radio Prague broadcast domestically and internationally.

Czechoslovak Television started broadcasting in 1953 from Prague, in 1955 from Ostrava and in 1956 from Bratislava. Daily broadcasting started in 1959, broadcasting in colour in 1970 from Bratislava. A second TV channel was added in 1970. Since then, the first TV channel was conceived as a federal one (i.e. mostly in Czech, but also in Slovak), the second TV channel was different for the Czech Socialist Republic (in Czech) and for the Slovak Socialist Republic (in Slovak). A third TV channel was added only in the mid-late 1980s. It broadcast the First Programme of Soviet Union Central Television.

TV was not jammed by the authorities. The radio station Voice of America and the BBC World Service also had some audiences in Czechoslovakia, and their broadcasts were subject to only occasional jamming. Radio Free Europe broadcasts, however, were extensively jammed.

== See also ==
- Eastern Bloc information dissemination
