= Liberal-Social Union =

Liberal-Social Union Liberálně sociální unie
- Leader: František Trnka
- Founded: 1991
- Dissolved: 1994
- Ideology: Social liberalism Green liberalism
- Political position: Centre-left
- Colours: Green
- Alliance Members: Green Party; Czechochoslovak Socialist Party; Agrarian Party; Movement of Farmers and Independents

The Liberal-Social Union (Czech: Liberálně sociální unie) was a political alliance in Czechoslovakia and the Czech Republic, existing from 1991 to 1994, and led by František Trnka.

== History ==
The alliance was established to run in the 1992 elections, and consisted of the Green Party, the Czechochoslovak Socialist Party (ČSS), the Agrarian Party and the Movement of Farmers and Independents. In the elections to the Czechoslovak Federal Assembly it won seven seats in the Chamber of the People and five in the Chamber of the Nations. In the elections to the National Council of the Czech Republic the party won 16 seats. The alliance did not run in Slovakia.

In June 1993, the ČSS left the alliance and changed its name to Liberal National Social Party (LSNS), later merging with the Free Democrats. Prior to the 1996 elections, part of the remaining alliance merged with the Christian Social Union and the Moravian Centre Party to form the Moravian Centre Union. However, the new party received just 0.5% of the vote and failed to win a seat.

== Successor parties ==
- Green Party (SZ)
- Czech National Social Party (ČSNS)
- The Moravians (Moravané)
