= Liberal Democratic Party (Czechoslovakia) =

Liberal Democratic Party Liberálně demokratická strana
- Founded: 1990
- Dissolved: 1992
- Merged into: Civic Democratic Alliance
- Ideology: Liberalism
- International affiliation: Liberal International (observer)

The Liberal Democratic Party (Czech: Liberálně demokratická strana; LDS), originally known as the Czechoslovak Democratic Initiative, was a Czechoslovak liberal political party formed on 31 January 1990, shortly after the Velvet Revolution, by Emanuel Mandler (born 1932) and his political group, inspired by the political ideas of Tomas Garrigue Masaryk.

LDS was initially active in the Civic Forum, before splitting from the party after the June 1990 parliamentary elections to work as a separate party. At this point the party had two representatives in the Federal Assembly, five in the Czech National Council, and 25 local branches with a membership of between 1300 and 5000. However, the party struggled to survive outside of Civic Forum, and was dependent on support from the German Free Democratic Party. The party elected a new leader, Viktorie Hradská (born 1944), in November 1991, but soon split, with Hradská's faction soon merging with the Civic Democratic Alliance.

The party was liquidated in 1992.
