= 1971 Czech National Council election =

- 26–27 November 1971

All 200 seats in the Czech National Council
	First party
Leader	Gustáv Husák
Party	KSČ
Alliance	National Front
Seats won	132
Seat change	▲4
Prime Minister before election
Josef Korčák
KSČ
Prime Minister after election
Josef Korčák
KSČ

National Council elections were held in the Czech part of Czechoslovakia on 26 and 27 November 1971. They were the first direct elections after the creation of the Czech National Council, whose first members were co-opted in 1968 by the members of National Assembly, elected in 1964.

== Results ==
Party or alliance		Votes	%	Seats
National Front	Communist Party of Czechoslovakia			132
National Front	Czechoslovak People's Party			15
National Front	Czechoslovak Socialist Party			12
National Front	Independents			41
Total				200
Total votes		7,207,961	–	
Registered voters/turnout		7,250,648	99.41	
Source: Databáze poslanců, CZSO
