= Letohrad =

- Town
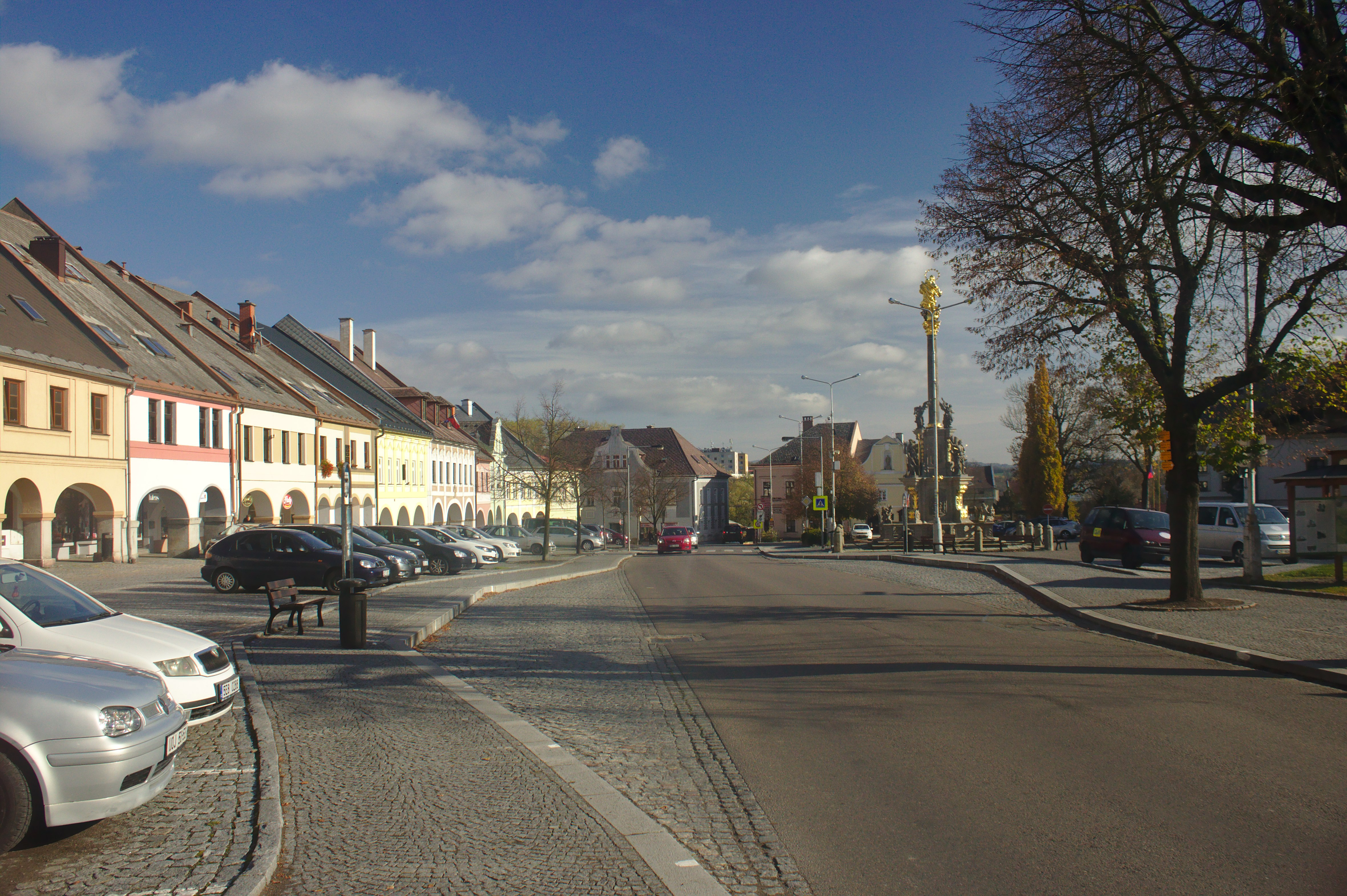
- The square Václavské náměstí

- Flag Coat of arms

- Location in the Czech Republic
- Coordinates: 50°2′9″N 16°29′56″E
- Country: Czech Republic
- Region: Pardubice
- District: Ústí nad Orlicí
- First mentioned: 1308

Government
  - Mayor: Petr Fiala

Area
  - Total: 23.55 km^{2} (9.09 sq mi)
- Elevation: 372 m (1,220 ft)

Population (2026-01-01)
  - Total: 6,345
  - Density: 269.4/km^{2} (697.8/sq mi)
- Time zone: UTC+1 (CET)
  - Summer (DST): UTC+2 (CEST)
- Postal code: 561 51
- Website: www.letohrad.eu

Letohrad (Czech pronunciation: [ˈlɛtoɦrat]; until 1950 Kyšperk; German: Geiersberg) is a town in Ústí nad Orlicí District in the Pardubice Region of the Czech Republic. It has about 6,300 inhabitants. The town is located on the Tichá Orlice River in the Orlické Foothills.

The historic town centre is well preserved and is protected as an urban monument zone. The main landmark is the Letohrad Castle.

== Administrative division ==
Letohrad consists of four municipal parts (in brackets population according to the 2021 census):

- Letohrad (3,921)
- Červená (205)
- Kunčice (1,016)
- Orlice (1,028)

== Etymology ==
The original German name Geiersberg meant "vulture mountain" and the Czech name Kynšperk was created by its transcription. The modern name Letohrad was created by amalgamation of the Czech words letovisko (meaning 'summer resort') and hradisko (here meaning 'little castle').

== Geography ==
Letohrad is located about 10 kilometres (6 mi) northeast of Ústí nad Orlicí and 50 km (31 mi) east of Pardubice. It lies in the Orlické Foothills. The highest point is at 545 m (1,788 ft) above sea level. The Tichá Orlice River flows through the town.

== History ==
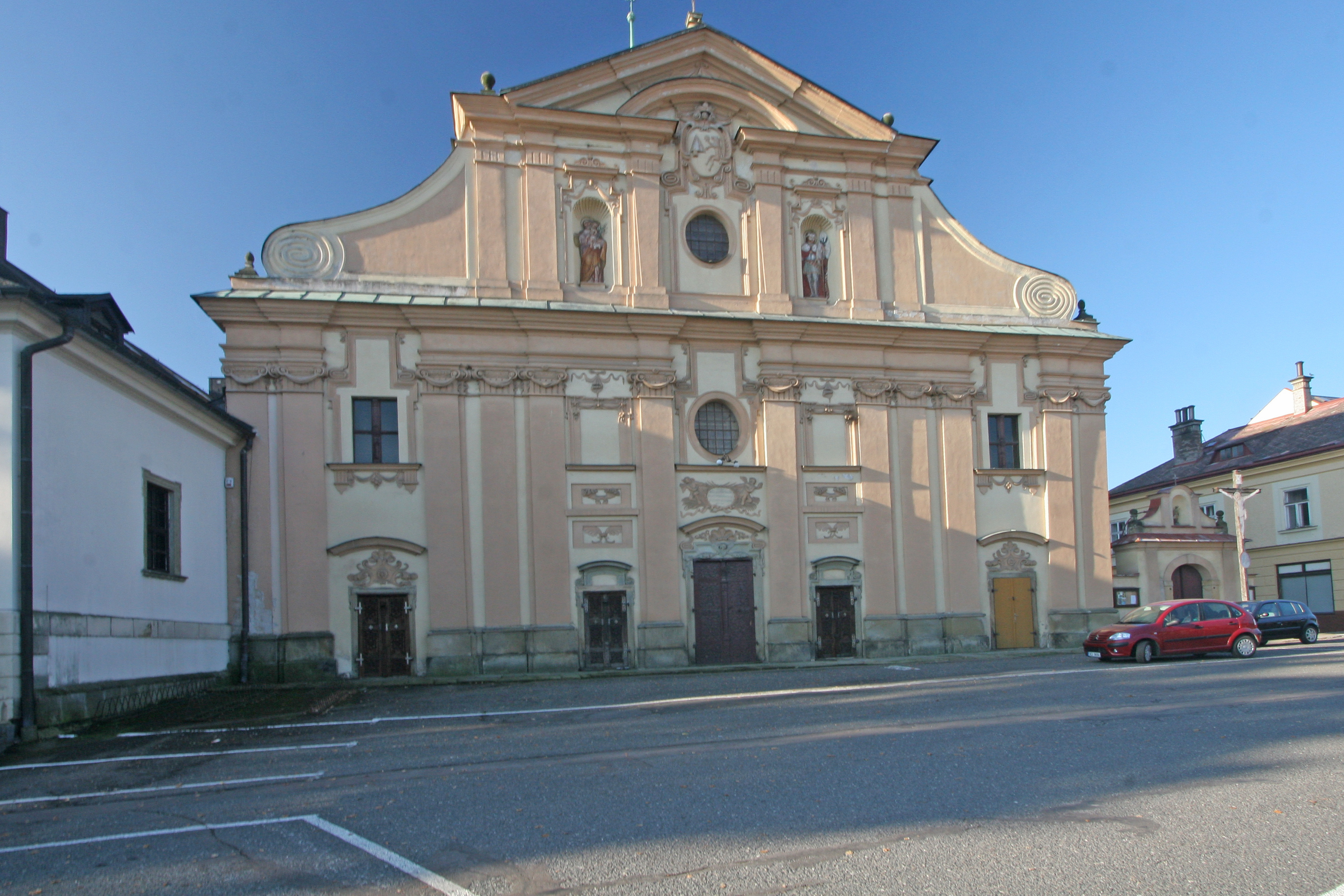
Church of Saint Wenceslaus

The first written mention of Kyšperk Castle, a predecessor of the settlement, is from 1308 when it was mentioned in Zbraslav chronicles. It was founded by the Lords of Žampach in the 13th century. Existence of the castle was last mentioned in 1419. In 1513, the town of Kyšperk was first mentioned. It was probably founded much earlier as a settlement beneath the castle, but it had the same owner all the time and there was no reason to create records.

The town experienced a rapid development in the 17th century, when the estate was owned by the Vitanovský of Vlčkovice family. During the rule of Hynek Jetřich Vitanovský of Vlčkovice, Kyšperk greatly improved its state: he had rebuilt the original fortress into a Baroque castle, had built a castle chapel which later became the Church of Saint Wenceslaus, handcraftsmen were allowed to establish guilds, and a hospital for poor and old people was founded.

The large fire in 1824 burned down 76 houses. In 1874, a railway crossed Kyšperk, starting the growth of the textile industry. After World War II, Kyšperk turned into a modern town with a major electrotechnical industry.

In 1950, the municipalities of Kyšperk, Orlice, Kunčice and Rotnek were merged. The new municipality was named Letohrad. Kyšperk was renamed Letohrad and Rotnek was renamed Červená. After the Velvet Revolution in 1989, the historical centre of the town was renovated.

== Demographics ==
Historical population

Year	Pop.	±%
1869	3,461	—
1880	3,543	+2.4%
1890	3,656	+3.2%
1900	3,863	+5.7%
1910	4,189	+8.4%

Year	Pop.	±%
1921	4,225	+0.9%
1930	4,523	+7.1%
1950	4,092	−9.5%
1961	4,844	+18.4%
1970	5,078	+4.8%

Year	Pop.	±%
1980	5,624	+10.8%
1991	6,203	+10.3%
2001	6,283	+1.3%
2011	6,318	+0.6%
2021	6,170	−2.3%

Source: Censuses

== Economy ==
The OEZ company, manufacturer of circuit breakers, fuses and other wiring equipment, is the largest employer in the town.

== Transport ==
Letohrad is located on the international railway line from Prague to Gdynia called Baltic Express, and on the regional line Ústí nad Orlicí–Moravský Karlov. It is also the terminus and start of a line from/to Hradec Králové.

== Sport ==
Letohrad is known for its biathlon club, from which several national representatives and Olympic medalists come. There is a ski resort in Kunčice.

The town's football club FK OEZ Letohrad plays in the lower amateur tiers.

== Sights ==
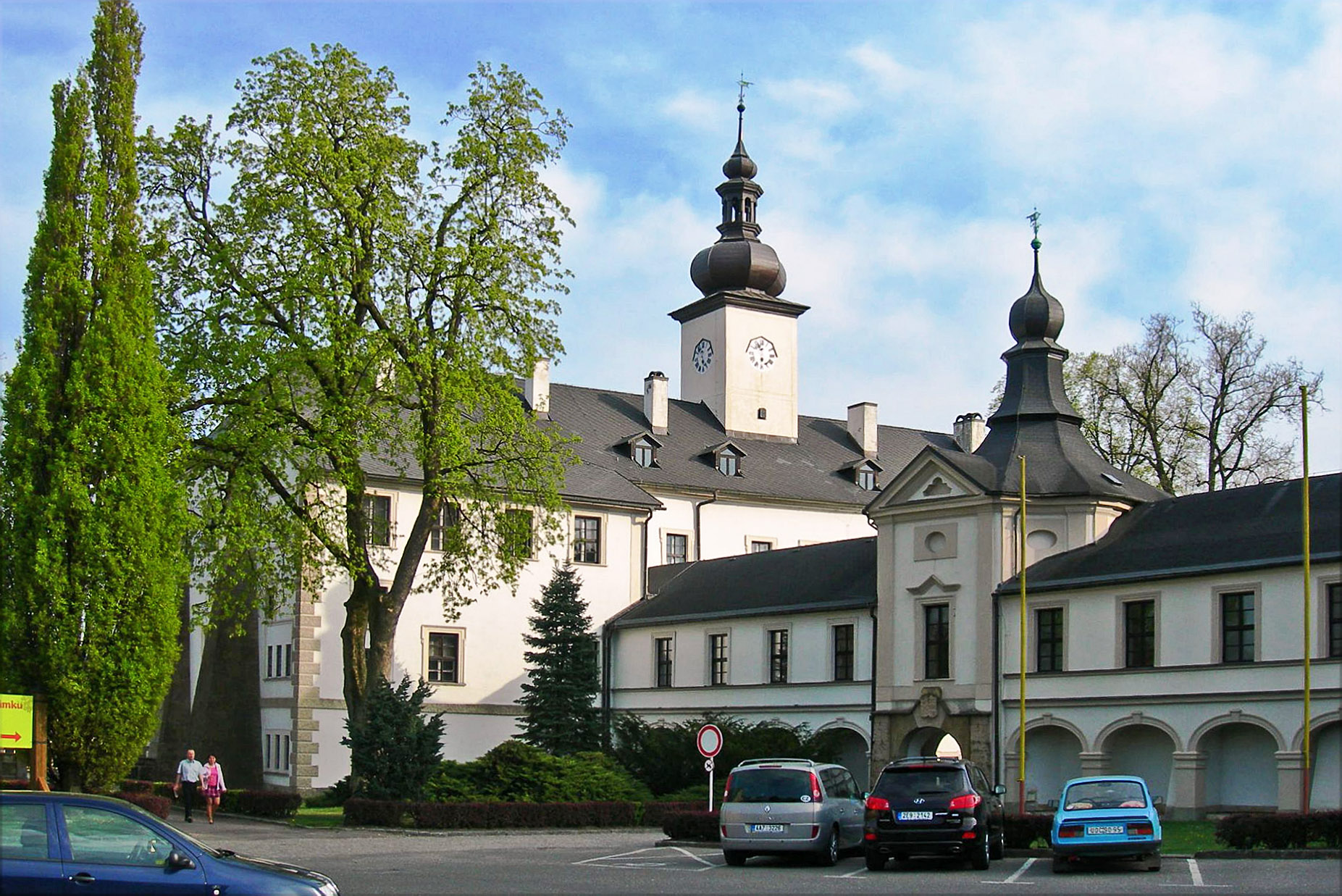
Letohrad Castle

The historic centre is formed by the square Václavské náměstí with preserved Baroque burgher houses, the Church of Saint Wenceslaus, the Letohrad Castle, and Marian column in the middle of the square. The Church of Saint Wenceslaus was built in the Baroque style in 1680–1685. It is decorated with stucco by the Italian master Giovanni Maderna.

The Letohrad Castle was built in the Renaissance style in 1554 and rebuilt in the early Baroque style in 1680–1685. It contains an exposition on contemporary way of life open to the public. Rest of the premises houses a hotel, a school, a cultural centre, and the Museum of Jára Cimrman. The castle is surrounded by an English-style park.

Other museums in the town are the Town Museum and the Museum of Crafts.

== Notable people ==
- František Vladislav Hek (1769–1847), early activist of Czech National Revival; died here
- Alphonse Mucha (1860–1939), painter; lived and worked in the town in 1934–1935
- Josef Korbel (1909–1977), diplomat
- Vlasta Štěpová (born 1938), politician and economist
- Michal Šlesingr (born 1983), biathlete; raised here
- Ondřej Moravec (born 1984), biathlete; raised here

== Twin towns – sister cities ==
Letohrad is twinned with:

- Daruvar, Croatia
- Hausen am Albis, Switzerland
- Niemcza, Poland
