= Karel Dyba =

Czech economist and politician (1940–2024)

Ambassador of the Czech Republic to the OECD
- In office 2007–2012
- Preceded by: Jiří Maceška
- Succeeded by: Pavel Rozsypal

Minister of the Economy of the Czech Republic
- In office 31 October 1992 – 4 July 1996
- Prime Minister: Václav Klaus
- Preceded by: Ministry established
- Succeeded by: Jaromír Schneider

Minister of Economic Policy and Development (within the Czech and Slovak Federative Republic)
- In office 2 July 1992 – 31 October 1992
- Prime Minister: Václav Klaus
- Preceded by: Ministry established
- Succeeded by: Ministry disestablished

Minister Without Portfolio of the Czech Republic
- In office 29 June 1990 – 2 July 1992
- Prime Minister: Petr Pithart
- Preceded by: Tomáš Ježek
- Succeeded by: Miroslav Grégr

Member of the Federal Assembly of Czechoslovakia
- In office 6 June 1992 – 31 December 1992

Personal details
- Born: 21 October 1940 Prostějov, Protectorate of Bohemia and Moravia
- Died: 22 July 2024 (aged 83)
- Profession: Economist

Karel Dyba (21 October 1940 – 22 July 2024) was a Czech economist, politician and diplomat. He served as a Czech Republic government minister during the 1990s under Prime Ministers Petr Pithart and Václav Klaus. He served the Czech Republic's first Minister of Economy from 1992 until 1996 with the First Cabinet of Václav Klaus and played a key role in the new nation's early economic development. In 1994, he became the first Czech government minister to visit Taiwan.

Dyba was a candidate for the Senate of the Czech Republic in the 1996 Czech parliamentary election for district No. 35 – Jablonec nad Nisou. He won the first round with more than 36 percent of the vote, but was defeated in the second round by František Vízek of the Social Democracy party. Dyba left politics following his election loss in 1996 and worked in the private sector as an investment banking and strategic economics consultant.

In 2007, he was appointed Ambassador to the Organisation for Economic Co-operation and Development (OECD), a position he held until 2012.

Dyba died on 22 July 2024, at the age of 83.
