= Ivan Dejmal =

Czech politician (1946–2008)

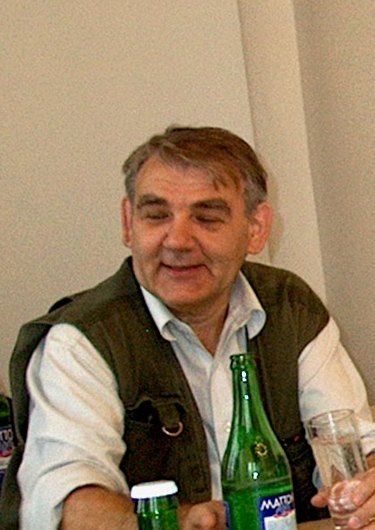
- Ivan Dejmal, in 2003.

Minister of the Environment
- In office 24 January 1991 – 2 July 1992
- Prime Minister: Petr Pithart
- Preceded by: Bedřich Moldan
- Succeeded by: František Benda

Personal details
- Born: 17 October 1946 Ústí nad Labem, Czechoslovakia
- Died: 6 February 2008 (aged 61) Prague, Czech Republic
- Party: KDS (1989–1992); ODA (1992–1998); Green Party (2004–2008)
- Education: Czech University of Life Sciences Prague
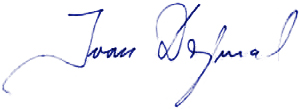
- Signature

Ivan Dejmal (17 October 1946 – 6 February 2008) was a Czech politician and environmentalist.

== Biography ==
Ivan Dejmal was born on 17 October 1946 in Ústí nad Labem. He studied at the Czech University of Life Sciences Prague in Prague from 1965 to 1970, but he was expelled following his arrest for activity in the students’ movement. He spent four years in prison on charges of "subversive activity against the Republic" (1970–1972 and 1974–1976).

He became a signatory to Charter 77 early in 1977 and soon became the head of its environmental commission, despite limited education in ecology. In 1987, Dejmal started to issue the samizdat journal Ecological Bulletin (Ekologický bulletin). In 1988, Dejmal founded the first independent ecological organization in Czechoslovakia the Ecological Society (Ekologická společnost). In December 1989, Dejmal participated in the foundation of the Confederation of Political Prisoners.

In 1989, he was an active member of the Civic Forum, he headed the ecological section. From February 1991 to July 1992, he was Czech Minister of the Environment.

Dejmal was supporter of several environmental NGOs - an active member of Společnost pro trvale udržitelný život (Society for Sustainable Living), a member of Honorary board of Děti Země (Children of the Earth), etc.

Dejmal died on 6 February 2008 in Prague.
