= Vlasta Štěpová =

Czech politician and economist (born 1938)

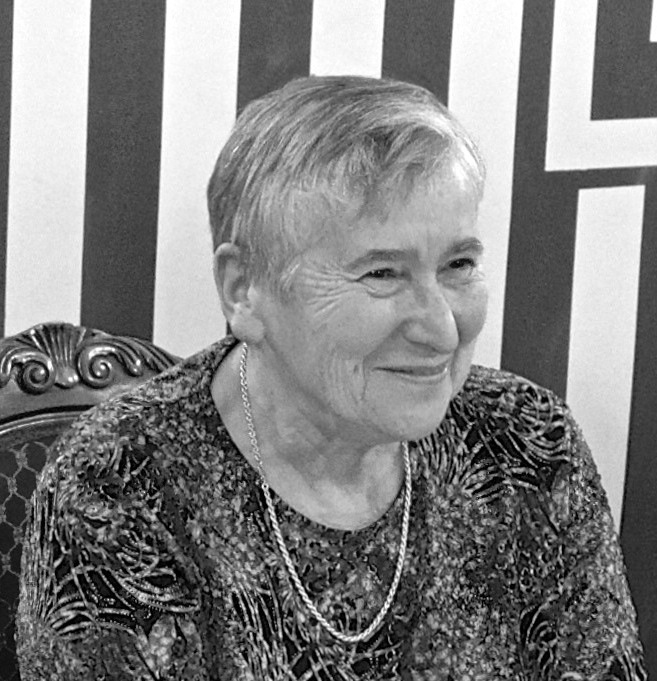

Czechoslovak Minister of Trade and Tourism in the Federation
- In office 5 December 1989 – 2 July 1992
- Prime Minister: František Pitra; Petr Pithart
- Preceded by: Karel Erbes
- Succeeded by: Vladimír Dlouhý

Member of the Czech National Council
- In office 7 June 1990 – 4 June 1992

Member of the Chamber of Deputies
- In office 1 June 1996 – 20 June 2002

Personal details
- Born: 7 June 1938 (age 88) Letohrad, Czechoslovakia
- Party: Civic Forum; Social Democratic Party
- Education: University of Economics, Prague
- Occupation: politician, economist

Vlasta Štěpová (born 7 June 1938) is a Czech former politician and economist. She was the Czechoslovak Minister of Trade and Tourism in the Federation between 1989 and 1992, as part of the cabinet of firstly František Pitra, then Petr Pithart. She was elected as a member of the Civic Forum to the Czech National Council in June 1990. After spending some time with the Civic Movement (Občanské hnutí), she joined the Social Democratic Party in March 1994. In 1996 she was elected to the Chamber of Deputies of the Parliament of the Czech Republic.
