= 1976 Czech National Council election =

- 22–23 October 1976

All 200 seats in the Czech National Council
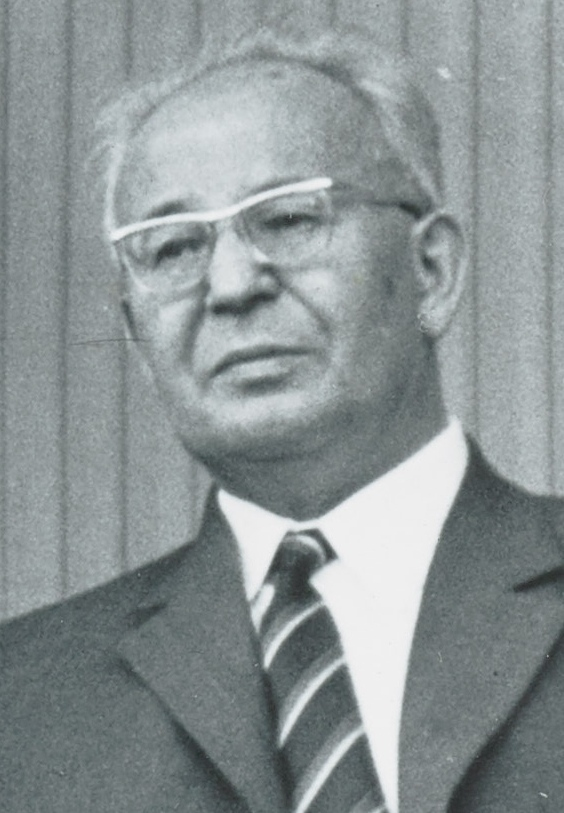
	First party
Leader	Gustáv Husák
Party	KSČ
Alliance	National Front
Seats won	135
Seat change	▲3
Prime Minister before election
Josef Korčák
KSČ
Prime Minister after election
Josef Korčák
KSČ

National Council elections were held in the Czech part of Czechoslovakia on 22 and 23 October 1976.

== Results ==
Party or alliance		Votes	%	Seats
National Front	Communist Party of Czechoslovakia			135
National Front	Czechoslovak Socialist Party			14
National Front	Czechoslovak People's Party			14
National Front	Independents			37
Total				200
Total votes		7,392,467	–	
Registered voters/turnout		7,418,482	99.65	
Source: Databáze poslanců, CZSO
