= 1986 Czech National Council election =

- 23–24 May 1986

All 200 seats in the Czech National Council
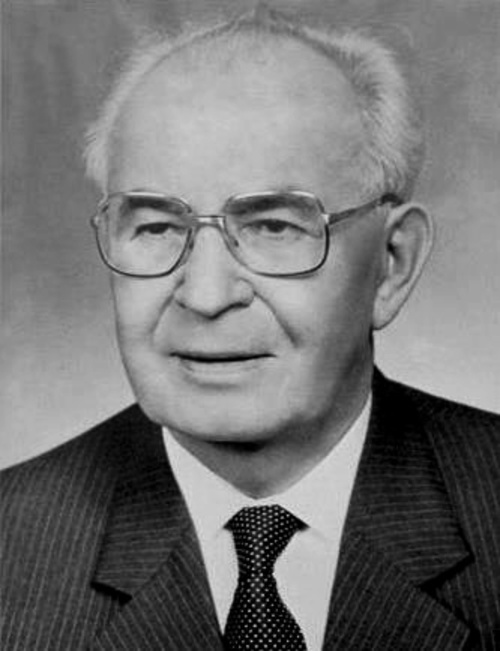
	First party
Leader	Gustáv Husák
Party	KSČ
Alliance	National Front
Seats won	137
Seat change	Steady
Prime Minister before election
Josef Korčák
KSČ
Prime Minister after election
Josef Korčák
KSČ

National Council elections were held in the Czech part of Czechoslovakia on 23 and 24 May 1986.

== Results ==
Party or alliance		Votes	%	Seats
National Front	Communist Party of Czechoslovakia			137
National Front	Czechoslovak Socialist Party			14
National Front	Czechoslovak People's Party			14
National Front	Independents			35
Total				200
Total votes		7,350,347	–	
Registered voters/turnout		7,404,516	99.27	
Source: Databáze poslanců CZSO
