= Bedřich Moldan =

Czech ecologist, publicist and politician

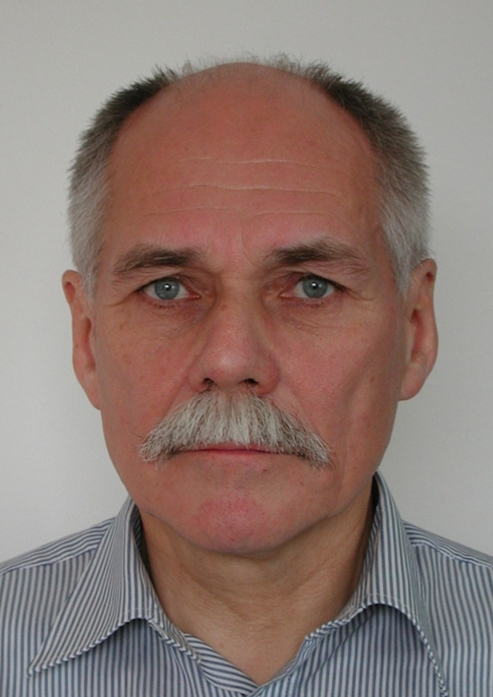
- Bedřich Moldan (2004)

Minister of the Environment
- In office 29 June 1990 – 24 January 1991
- Prime Minister: Petr Pithart
- Preceded by: Position established
- Succeeded by: Ivan Dejmal

Minister without portfolio
- In office 5 December 1989 – 29 June 1990
- Prime Minister: František Pitra; Petr Pithart
- Preceded by: Jan Motl
- Succeeded by: Tomáš Ježek

Senator from Kutná Hora
- In office 13 November 2004 – 13 November 2010
- Preceded by: Jan Fencl
- Succeeded by: Jaromír Strnad

Personal details
- Born: 15 August 1935 (age 91) Prague, Czechoslovakia
- Party: Civic Democratic Party (1991–2010); TOP 09 (2010–present)
- Spouse: Dobrava Moldanová
- Education: Charles University

Bedřich Moldan (born 15 August 1935, Prague, Czechoslovakia) is a Czech ecologist, publicist and politician.

Moldan is professor of environmental science, founder and director of the Charles University Environment Center. From 2001 to 2004 coordinating lead author of Millennium Ecosystem Assessment.

From 1990 to 1991, Bedřich Moldan was the first Minister of Environment of the Czech Republic, then part of Czechoslovakia. He is a founding member of the Civic Democratic Party. In 2004 he was elected to the Senate of the Czech Republic.

In 2010 he received the SCOPE-Zhongyu Environmental Award for lifetime achievement.
