= 1968 Czech National Council election =

1968 Czech legislative election
- 10 June 1968

All 150 seats in the Czech National Council (indirectly elected by the National Assembly)
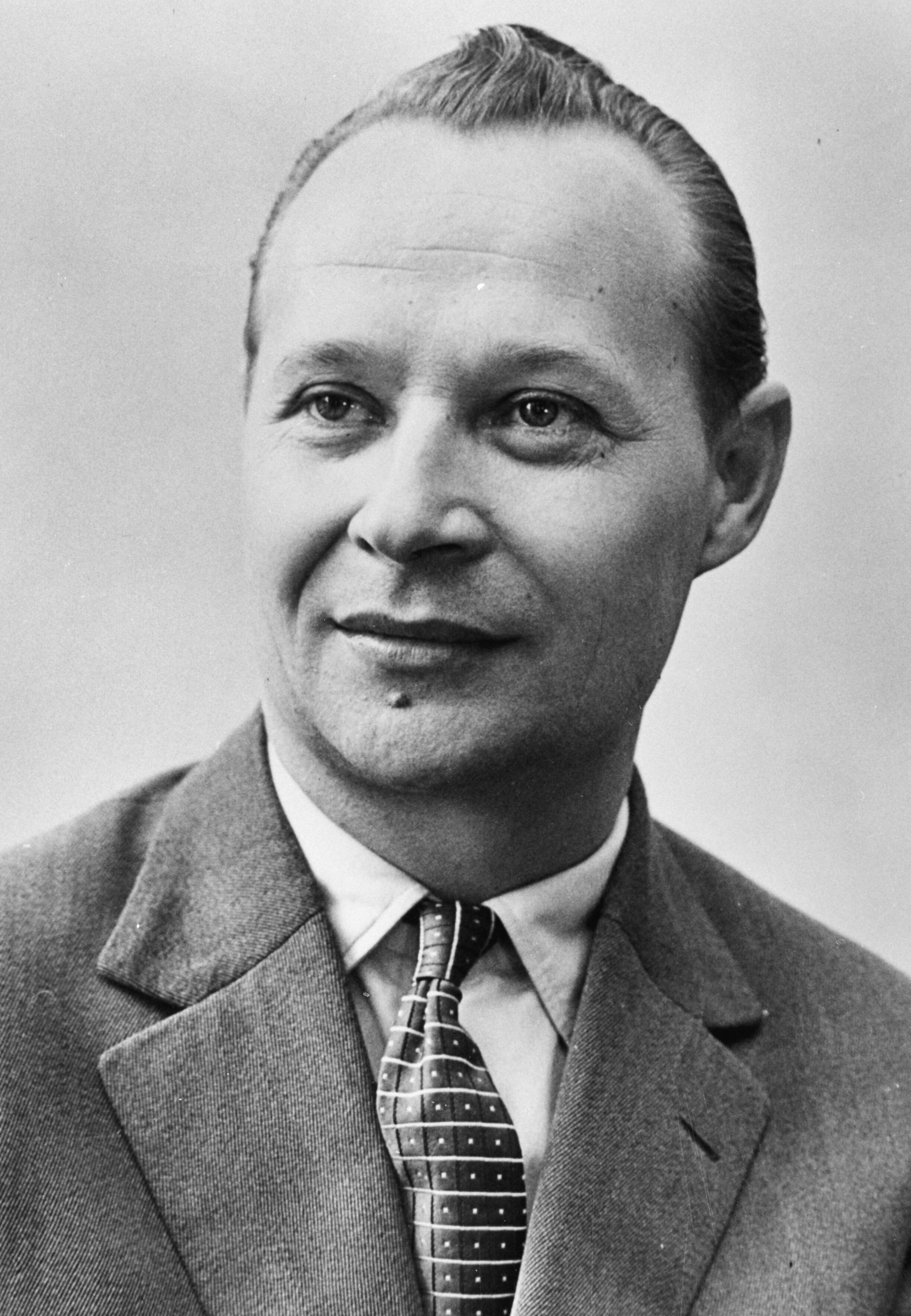
	First party
Leader	Alexander Dubček
Party	KSČ
Alliance	National Front
Seats won	128
Prime Minister after election
Stanislav Rázl
KSČ

Indirect National Council elections were held in the Czech part of Czechoslovakia on 10 June 1968, the first time Czechs had elected their own legislature. Of the 200 members of the National Council, 150 were elected indirectly by the National Assembly, whilst the other 50 members were elected by the National Council itself on 21 November 1968.

== Results ==
Party or alliance		Seats
National Front	Communist Party of Czechoslovakia	128
National Front	Czechoslovak Socialist Party	25
National Front	Czechoslovak People's Party	25
National Front	Independents	22
Total		200
Source: Databáze poslanců, CZSO
