= 1992 Czechoslovak parliamentary election =

- 5–6 June 1992
- House of the People
- All 150 seats in the House of the People; 76 seats needed for a majority
- Turnout: 84.68%
| Party | Leader | Vote % | Seats | +/– |
|---|---|---|---|---|
| ODS–KDS | Václav Klaus | 22.97 | 48 | New |
| HZDS | Vladimír Mečiar | 10.82 | 24 | New |
| KSČM | Jiří Svoboda | 9.66 | 19 | New |
| ČSSD–SDSS | Valtr Komárek; Alexander Dubček | 6.76 | 10 | New |
| SDĽ | Peter Weiss | 4.66 | 10 | New |
| SPR–RSČ | Miroslav Sládek | 4.51 | 8 | New |
| KDU-ČSL | Josef Lux | 4.05 | 7 | New |
| LSU | František Trnka | 3.95 | 7 | New |
| SNS | Jozef Prokeš | 3.03 | 6 | 0 |
| KDH | Ján Čarnogurský | 2.89 | 6 | −5 |
| MKDM–Coexistence | Béla Bugár | 2.43 | 5 | 0 |
This lists parties that won seats. See the complete results below.
- House of Nations
- All 150 seats in the House of Nations; 76 seats needed for a majority
- Turnout: 84.67%
| Party | Leader | Vote % | Seats | +/– |
|---|---|---|---|---|
| ODS–KDS | Václav Klaus | 22.65 | 37 | New |
| HZDS | Vladimír Mečiar | 10.92 | 33 | New |
| KSČM | Jiří Svoboda | 9.81 | 15 | New |
| ČSSD–SDSS | Valtr Komárek; Alexander Dubček | 6.57 | 11 | New |
| SDĽ | Peter Weiss | 4.53 | 13 | New |
| SPR–RSČ | Miroslav Sládek | 4.43 | 6 | New |
| KDU-ČSL | Josef Lux | 4.12 | 6 | New |
| LSU | František Trnka | 4.11 | 5 | New |
| SNS | Jozef Prokeš | 3.02 | 9 | 0 |
| KDH | Ján Čarnogurský | 2.84 | 8 | −6 |
| MKDM–Coexistence | Béla Bugár | 2.43 | 7 | +7 |
This lists parties that won seats. See the complete results below.
| Prime Minister before | Prime Minister after |
|---|---|
| Marián Čalfa; ODÚ | Jan Stráský; ODS |

Federal elections were held in Czechoslovakia on 5 and 6 June 1992, alongside elections for the Czech and Slovak Assemblies. The result was a victory for the Civic Democratic Party–Christian Democratic Party (ODS-KDS) alliance, which won 48 of the 150 seats in the House of the People and 37 of the 150 seats in the House of Nations. Voter turnout was 84.7%.

This would be the last election held in Czechoslovakia. ODS leader Václav Klaus insisted that the leader of the largest Slovak party, Vladimír Mečiar, agree to a tightly knit federation with a strong central government. Meciar, however, was only willing to agree to a loose confederation in which the Czech lands and Slovakia would both be sovereign. It soon became apparent that a coalition between the two blocs was not feasible, leading Klaus and Meciar to agree to a "velvet divorce." The Federal Assembly formally voted Czechoslovakia out of existence on November 25. Effective on 1 January 1993, Czechoslovakia split into two countries, the Czech Republic and Slovakia.

== Results ==
=== House of the People ===
| Party | Votes | % | Seats | +/– |
|---|---|---|---|---|
| Civic Democratic Party–Christian Democratic Party | 2,200,937 | 22.97 | 48 | New |
| Movement for a Democratic Slovakia | 1,036,459 | 10.82 | 24 | New |
| Communist Party of Bohemia and Moravia | 926,228 | 9.66 | 19 | New |
| Czechoslovak Social Democracy–Social Democratic Party of Slovakia | 648,125 | 6.76 | 10 | New |
| Party of the Democratic Left | 446,230 | 4.66 | 10 | New |
| Rally for the Republic – Republican Party of Czechoslovakia | 432,075 | 4.51 | 8 | New |
| KDU-ČSL | 388,122 | 4.05 | 7 | New |
| Liberal-Social Union | 378,962 | 3.95 | 7 | New |
| Civic Democratic Alliance | 323,614 | 3.38 | 0 | New |
| Slovak National Party | 290,249 | 3.03 | 6 | 0 |
| Civic Movement | 284,854 | 2.97 | 0 | New |
| Movement for Autonomous Democracy–Party for Moravia and Silesia | 279,136 | 2.91 | 0 | –9 |
| Christian Democratic Movement | 277,061 | 2.89 | 6 | –5 |
| Hungarian Christian Democratic Movement–Coexistence | 232,776 | 2.43 | 5 | 0 |
| Pensioners for Life Security | 214,681 | 2.24 | 0 | New |
| Czechoslovak Businessmen's, Traders' and Farmers' Party | 166,325 | 1.74 | 0 | New |
| Club of Committed Non-Party Members | 129,022 | 1.35 | 0 | New |
| Civic Democratic Union | 122,359 | 1.28 | 0 | New |
| Democratic Party | 122,226 | 1.28 | 0 | 0 |
| Slovak Christian Democratic Movement | 106,612 | 1.11 | 0 | New |
| Independent Initiative | 89,817 | 0.94 | 0 | New |
| Green Party in Slovakia | 81,047 | 0.85 | 0 | New |
| Hungarian Civic Party | 72,877 | 0.76 | 0 | New |
| Friends of Beer Party | 68,985 | 0.72 | 0 | 0 |
| Democrats 92 for a Common State | 68,168 | 0.71 | 0 | New |
| Movement for Social Justice | 67,406 | 0.70 | 0 | New |
| Party of Labour and Security | 38,580 | 0.40 | 0 | New |
| Roma Civic Initiative | 33,576 | 0.35 | 0 | New |
| Union of Communists of Slovakia | 23,487 | 0.25 | 0 | New |
| Republican Party and National Democratic Unity | 10,335 | 0.11 | 0 | New |
| Slovak People's Party | 10,150 | 0.11 | 0 | New |
| National Social Party – Czechoslovak National Socialist Party | 8,922 | 0.09 | 0 | New |
| National Liberals | 2,457 | 0.03 | 0 | New |
| Movement for Freedom of Speech–Slovak Republican Union | 1,576 | 0.02 | 0 | New |
| Total | 9,583,436 | 100.00 | 150 | 0 |
| Valid votes | 9,583,436 | 98.28 | | |
| Invalid/blank votes | 167,542 | 1.72 | | |
| Total votes | 9,750,978 | 100.00 | | |
| Registered voters/turnout | 11,515,699 | 84.68 | | |
Source: Nohlen & Stöver

=== House of Nations ===
| Party | Votes | % | Seats | +/– |
|---|---|---|---|---|
| Civic Democratic Party–Christian Democratic Party | 2,168,421 | 22.65 | 37 | New |
| Movement for a Democratic Slovakia | 1,045,395 | 10.92 | 33 | New |
| Communist Party of Bohemia and Moravia | 939,197 | 9.81 | 15 | New |
| Czechoslovak Social Democracy–Social Democratic Party of Slovakia | 629,029 | 6.57 | 11 | New |
| Party of the Democratic Left | 433,750 | 4.53 | 13 | New |
| Rally for the Republic – Republican Party of Czechoslovakia | 423,999 | 4.43 | 6 | New |
| KDU-ČSL | 394,296 | 4.12 | 6 | New |
| Liberal-Social Union | 393,182 | 4.11 | 5 | New |
| Movement for Autonomous Democracy–Party for Moravia and Silesia | 322,423 | 3.37 | 0 | –7 |
| Civic Movement | 307,334 | 3.21 | 0 | New |
| Slovak National Party | 288,864 | 3.02 | 9 | 0 |
| Christian Democratic Movement | 272,100 | 2.84 | 8 | –6 |
| Civic Democratic Alliance | 264,371 | 2.76 | 0 | New |
| Hungarian Christian Democratic Movement–Coexistence | 232,364 | 2.43 | 7 | 0 |
| Pensioners for Life Security | 222,860 | 2.33 | 0 | New |
| Czechoslovak Businessmen's, Traders' and Farmers' Party | 172,703 | 1.80 | 0 | New |
| Club of Committed Non-Party Members | 140,045 | 1.46 | 0 | New |
| Civic Democratic Union | 124,649 | 1.30 | 0 | New |
| Democratic Party | 113,176 | 1.18 | 0 | 0 |
| Independent Initiative | 106,186 | 1.11 | 0 | New |
| Slovak Christian Democratic Movement | 100,054 | 1.05 | 0 | New |
| Green Party in Slovakia | 75,149 | 0.78 | 0 | New |
| Democrats 92 for a Common State | 72,538 | 0.76 | 0 | New |
| Friends of Beer Party | 71,123 | 0.74 | 0 | 0 |
| Hungarian Civic Party | 71,122 | 0.74 | 0 | New |
| Movement for Social Justice | 67,073 | 0.70 | 0 | New |
| Roma Civic Initiative | 34,530 | 0.36 | 0 | New |
| Party of Labour and Security | 31,392 | 0.33 | 0 | New |
| Union of Communists of Slovakia | 22,202 | 0.23 | 0 | New |
| Republican Party and National Democratic Unity | 11,099 | 0.12 | 0 | New |
| Slovak People's Party | 10,056 | 0.11 | 0 | New |
| National Social Party – Czechoslovak National Socialist Party | 9,405 | 0.10 | 0 | New |
| National Liberals | 2,992 | 0.03 | 0 | New |
| Movement for Freedom of Speech–Slovak Republican Union | 1,086 | 0.01 | 0 | New |
| Total | 9,574,165 | 100.00 | 150 | 0 |
| Valid votes | 9,574,165 | 98.23 | | |
| Invalid/blank votes | 172,167 | 1.77 | | |
| Total votes | 9,746,332 | 100.00 | | |
| Registered voters/turnout | 11,511,054 | 84.67 | | |
Source: Nohlen & Stöver
