= 1981 Czech National Council election =

- 5–6 June 1981

All 200 seats in the Czech National Council
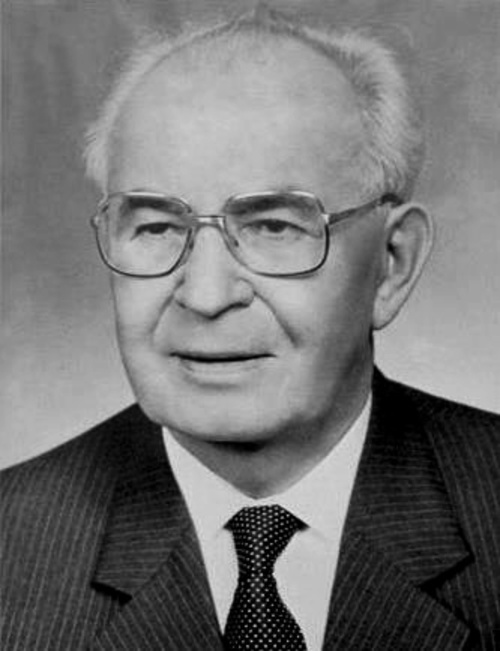
	First party
Leader	Gustáv Husák
Party	KSČ
Alliance	National Front
Seats won	137
Seat change	▲2
Prime Minister before election
Josef Korčák
KSČ
Prime Minister after election
Josef Korčák
KSČ

National Council elections were held in the Czech part of Czechoslovakia on 5 and 6 June 1981.

== Results ==
Party or alliance		Votes	%	Seats
National Front	Communist Party of Czechoslovakia			137
National Front	Czechoslovak Socialist Party			14
National Front	Czechoslovak People's Party			14
National Front	Independents			35
Total				200
Total votes		7,327,157	–	
Registered voters/turnout		7,372,132	99.39	
Source: Databáze poslanců, CZSO
