= Movement for Autonomous Democracy–Party for Moravia and Silesia =

Movement for Autonomous Democracy–Party for Moravia and Silesia Hnutí za samosprávnou demokracii - Společnost pro Moravu a Slezsko
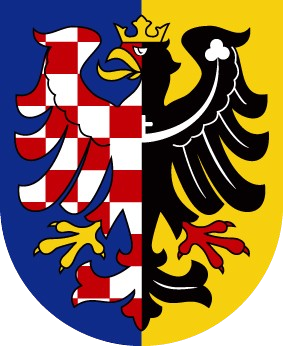
- Leaders: Boleslav Bárta; Jan Kryčer
- Founded: 1990
- Dissolved: 1996
- Merged into: Bohemian-Moravian; Centre Union
- Newspaper: Moravskoslezská orlice
- Ideology: Federalism; Moravian autonomism
- Political position: Centre
- Colours: Gold, Red

The Movement for Autonomous Democracy–Party for Moravia and Silesia (Czech: Hnutí za samosprávnou demokracii–Společnost pro Moravu a Slezsko, HSD–SMS) was a political party in Czechoslovakia and the Czech Republic that sought autonomy for Moravia.

== History ==
The party was established on 4 April 1990, and was initially led by Boleslav Bárta. In the elections to the Czechoslovak Federal Assembly in June it won nine seats in the Chamber of the People and seven in the Chamber of the Nations. In the simultaneous elections to the National Council of the Czech Republic the party won 23 seats, making it the third largest party in the Council. The party was part of Petr Pithart's coalition government between 1990 and 1992. Bárta died in 1991 and was replaced by Jan Kryčer.

In the federal elections in 1992 the party lost all its seats in both chambers of the Federal Assembly, whilst the Czech elections saw it reduced to 14 seats.

In 1993 the party was renamed the Movement for Self-Governing Democracy of Moravia and Silesia (Hnutí samosprávné demokracie Moravy a Slezska). After the liberal wing of the party came to power the following year, the party became the Moravian Centre Party (Českomoravskou stranu středu). In December 1994 it formed an alliance with the Liberal-Social Union and the Agrarian Party named the Moravian Centre Union, and formally merged into a single political party in February 1996. The new party failed to win a seat in the 1996 elections.

== Election results ==
=== Czech National Council ===
Election	Vote	%	Seats	Place	Status
1990	723,609	7.03	22 / 200	3rd	Government coalition
1992	380,088	5.87	14 / 200	8th	Opposition

=== Local elections ===
Election	Vote	%	Seats
1990	3,200,022	4.16	1,706
1994	563,674	0.44	372
