= 2003 Czech European Union membership referendum =

- 13–14 June 2003
- Do you agree with the Czech Republic becoming a member state of the European Union in accordance with the Treaty on the Accession of the Czech Republic to the European Union?

Results
| Choice | Votes | % |
|---|---|---|
| Yes | 3,446,758 | 77.33% |
| No | 1,010,448 | 22.67% |
| Valid votes | 4,457,206 | 97.79% |
| Invalid or blank votes | 100,754 | 2.21% |
| Total votes | 4,557,960 | 100.00% |
| Registered voters/turnout | 8,259,525 | 55.18% |

Czech Republic and the EU prior to its accession in 2004

A referendum on joining the European Union was held in the Czech Republic on 13 and 14 June 2003. The proposal was supported by 77% of voters, with a turnout of 55%. The Czech Republic joined the EU on 1 May 2004.

As of 2026, this was the most recent and only national referendum in the Czech Republic.

== Party positions ==
The table lists the political parties which were represented in the parliament at the time of the referendum.

| Position | Party |
|---|---|
| Yes | Czech Social Democratic Party |
| Yes | Civic Democratic Party |
| Yes | Christian and Democratic Union – Czechoslovak People's Party |
| Yes | Freedom Union – Democratic Union |
| No | Communist Party of Bohemia and Moravia |

== Opinion polls ==
Opinion polls in the run-up to the referendum showed support for joining from 63% to over 70%, with the highest support among younger, wealthier and better educated people.

| Date | Agency | Yes | No | Undecided |
|---|---|---|---|---|
| 19–26 May 2003 | CVVM | 63% | 22% | 15% |
| 7–14 April 2003 | CVVM | 58% | 24% | 18% |
| March 2003 | STEM | 51% | 16% | 33% |
| 3–10 March 2003 | CVVM | 59% | 22% | 19% |
| February 2003 | STEM | 50% | 32% | 18% |
| 3–10 February 2003 | CVVM | 59% | 23% | 18% |
| 28 January 2003 | STEM | 47% | 19% | 34% |
| December 2002 | STEM | 48% | 21% | 31% |
| November 2002 | STEM | 48% | 19% | 33% |
| 17–24 October 2002 | CVVM | 47% | 18% | 23% |
| September 2002 | STEM | 43% | 20% | 37% |
| 5–12 June 2002 | CVVM | 42% | 17% | 41% |
| 22–29 April 2002 | CVVM | 40% | 19% | 41% |
| March 2002 | STEM | 46% | 19% | 35% |
| November 2001 | STEM | 47% | 19% | 34% |
| 2–9 May 2001 | STEM | 40% | 22% | 38% |
| 5–12 March 2001 | STEM | 45% | 18% | 37% |
| October 2000 | STEM | 48% | 15% | 37% |
| May 2000 | STEM | 42% | 16% | 42% |
| September 1999 | STEM | 44% | 19% | 39% |
| April 1999 | STEM | 46% | 14% | 40% |
| April 1997 | STEM | 50% | 16% | 34% |
| August 1996 | STEM | 46% | 13% | 41% |

== Results ==
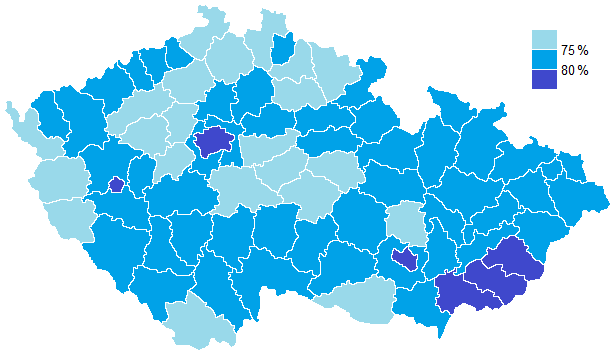
Results by district

| Choice | Votes | % |
|---|---|---|
| For | 3,446,758 | 77.33 |
| Against | 1,010,448 | 22.67 |
| Total | 4,457,206 | 100.00 |
| Valid votes | 4,457,206 | 97.79 |
| Invalid/blank votes | 100,754 | 2.21 |
| Total votes | 4,557,960 | 100.00 |
| Registered voters/turnout | 8,259,525 | 55.18 |
Source: Direct Democracy

== See also ==
- Czech Republic and the euro
- Euroscepticism in the Czech Republic
