= 1990 Czech municipal elections =

Municipal elections were held in the Czech Republic on 23 and 24 November 1990 as part of nationwide municipal elections in Czechoslovakia. Voter turnout was 73.55%. A total of 51 parties contested the elections, which were won by the Civic Forum. The elections also saw the introduction of independent candidates, who received over 10% of the vote.

== Results ==
Party	%	Seats
Civic Forum	35.6	21,113
Communist Party of Czechoslovakia	17.2	9,603
Czechoslovak People's Party	11.5	8,083
Independents	10.6	18,415
