= Christian Democratic Party (Czech Republic) =

Christian Democratic Party Křesťansko-demokratická strana
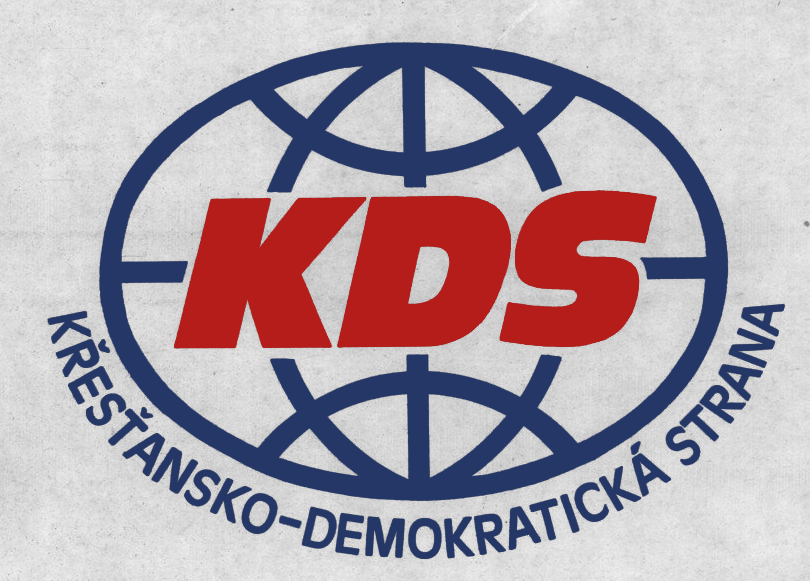
- Founded: 1990
- Dissolved: 1996
- Preceded by: Hnutí za občanskou svobodu
- Merged into: Civic Democratic Party
- Ideology: Conservatism; Christian democracy
- Political position: Centre-right

The Christian Democratic Party (Czech: Křesťansko-demokratická strana, KDS) was a Christian-democratic political party in the Czech Republic, functional between 1990 (founded shortly after the Velvet Revolution) and 1996. Its first chairman was Václav Benda, the last chairman from 1993-1996 the former Minister of Education Ivan Pilip.

== History ==
The KDS was established 1989/90 by a group of intellectuals and dissidents. The first congress was held in March 1990 and the former dissident Václav Benda was elected president of the new party.

In the first free Czechoslovak elections in June 1990, the party participated as part of the electoral coalition Christian Democratic Union (together with the Czechoslovak People's Party and the Slovak Christian Democratic Movement). The coalition won 8.4% of the votes and 20 seats in the Czech National Council.

In the parliamentary election in 1992, it participated on a common electoral list with the governing Civic Democratic Party. The coalition won 29.7% of the vote and 76 seats in the Czech National Council. The KDS became part of the first government of Václav Klaus along with the Civic Democrats (ODS and ODA) and the KDU-ČSL.

In 1996, it merged into the Civic Democratic Party.

=== Election results ===
- 1990 Czechoslovak House of the People: 5.9% - 9 seats (as part of the Christian Democratic Union)
- 1990 Czechoslovak House of Nations: 6.0% - 6 seats (as part of the Christian Democratic Union)
- 1990 Czech National Council: 8.4% - 4 seats (as part of the Christian Democratic Union)
- 1992 Czechoslovak House of the People: 23.0% - 48 seats (as part of the electoral coalition ODS-KDS)
- 1992 Czechoslovak House of Nations: 22.6% - 37 seats (as part of the electoral coalition ODS-KDS)
- 1992 Czech National Council: 29.7% - 10 seats (as part of the electoral coalition ODS-KDS)

== See also ==
- Christian democracy
- Christian and Democratic Union – Czechoslovak People's Party
- Civic Democratic Party
