= Ladislav Adamec =

Prime Minister of Czechoslovakia from 1988 to 1989

Prime Minister of Czechoslovakia
- In office 12 October 1988 – 10 December 1989
- President: Gustáv Husák
- Preceded by: Lubomír Štrougal
- Succeeded by: Marián Čalfa

4th Prime Minister of the Czech Socialist Republic
- In office 20 March 1987 – 12 October 1988
- Preceded by: Josef Korčák
- Succeeded by: František Pitra

Chairman of the Communist Party of Czechoslovakia
- In office 21 December 1989 – 1 September 1990
- Preceded by: Karel Urbánek
- Succeeded by: Office abolished

Personal details
- Born: 10 September 1926 Frenštát pod Radhoštěm, Czechoslovakia
- Died: 14 April 2007 (aged 80) Prague, Czech Republic
- Party: Communist Party of Czechoslovakia

Ladislav Adamec (10 September 1926 – 14 April 2007) was a Czechoslovak communist politician.

== Early life ==
Adamec was born in Moravia on 10 September 1926. From 1958 to 1961 he studied at the Political College of the Central Committee of the Communist Party of Czechoslovakia located in Prague.

== Career ==
Adamec joined the Presidium in March 1987 and served as the prime minister of the Czech Socialist Republic from March 1987 to 1988. Upon the retirement of Prime Minister Lubomír Štrougal on 12 October 1988, he assumed the role, thus serving as the last Communist prime minister of Czechoslovakia. He served in the post from 12 October 1988 to 7 December 1989. Marián Čalfa succeeded Adamec as prime minister.

On 20 December, Adamec became general secretary of the Communist Party of Czechoslovakia. He was the first person to hold that post since the 1940s who was not the de facto leader of the country; the party had given up its monopoly of power on 29 November.

In March 1990, Adamec became the chairman of the Communist Party. The post was created with his appointment.

== Velvet Revolution ==
The Velvet Revolution lasted from 17 November to 29 December 1989. During the Velvet Revolution student protesters took to the streets of Prague in what became an overthrow of the government. Large demonstrations that occurred on 25 and 26 November, and a public strike on 27 November, pushed the communist regime into holding a conference with the Civic Forum. The Forum demanded that Adamec form a new government—that would include existing political parties and Civic Forum. The federal government under Adamec had been in contact with different leaders since 21 November and on 26 November, Adamec even addressed the crowds on Letná.

== Death ==
Adamec died on 14 April 2007, at the age of 80.
