= 1992 Czech National Council election =

- 5–6 June 1992

All 200 seats in the Czech National Council 101 seats needed for a majority
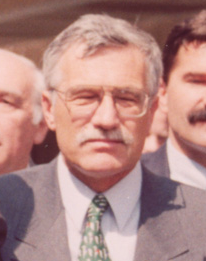

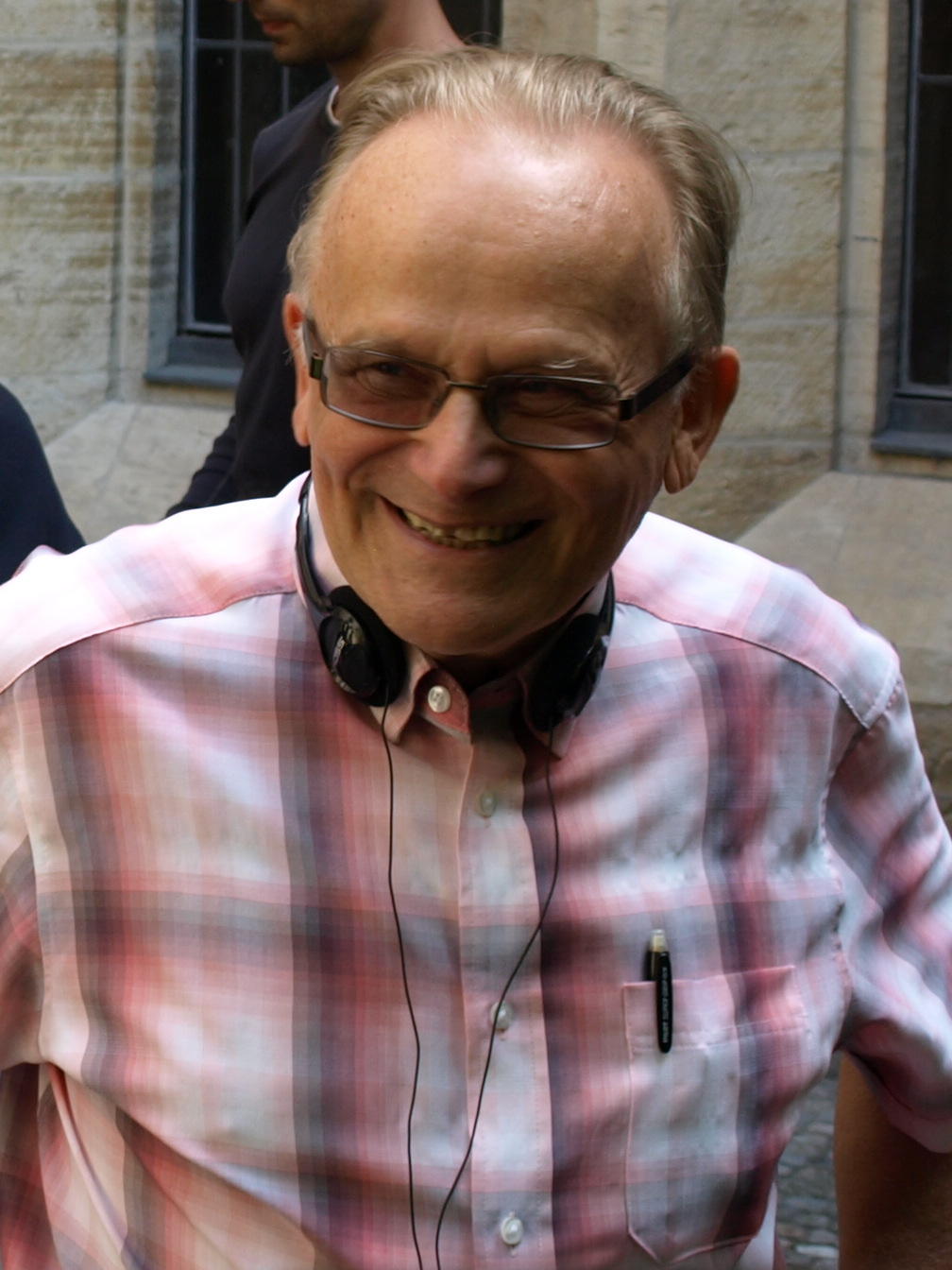

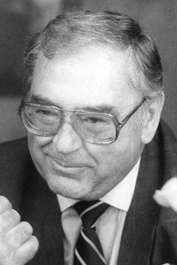

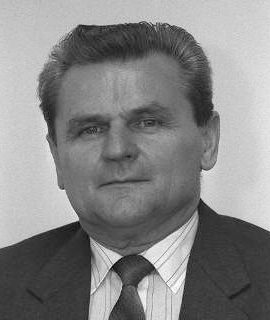

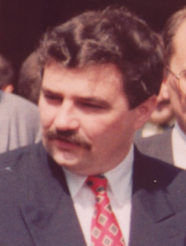

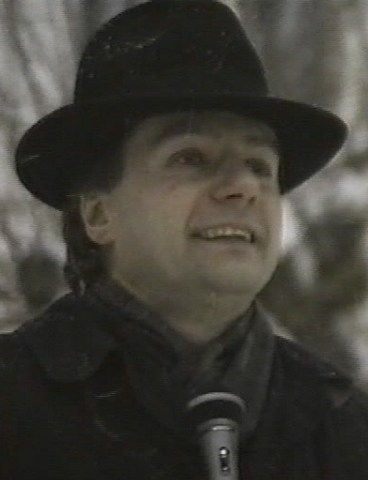

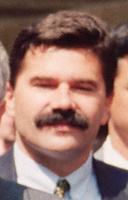
	First party	Second party	Third party
Leader	Václav Klaus	Jiří Svoboda	Jiří Horák
Party	ODS	KSČM	ČSSD
Alliance	ODS–KDS	LB
Seats won	76	35	16
Seat change	New	▲2	▲16
Popular vote	1,924,483	909,490	422,736
Percentage	29.73%	14.05%	6.53%
Swing	New	▲0.81 pp	▲2.42 pp
	Fourth party	Fifth party	Sixth party
Leader	František Trnka	Josef Lux	Miroslav Sládek
Party	ZS	KDU-ČSL	SPR–RSČ
Alliance	LSU
Seats won	16	15	14
Seat change	▲16	▼5	New
Popular vote	421,988	406,341	387,026
Percentage	6.52%	6.28%	5.98%
Swing	▼0.26 pp	▼2.14 pp	New
	Seventh party	Eighth party
		HSD-SMS
Leader	Jan Kalvoda	Jan Kryčer
Party	ODA	HSD–SMS
Seats won	14	14
Seat change	New	▼9
Popular vote	383,705	380,088
Percentage	5.93%	5.87%
Swing	New	▼4.16 pp
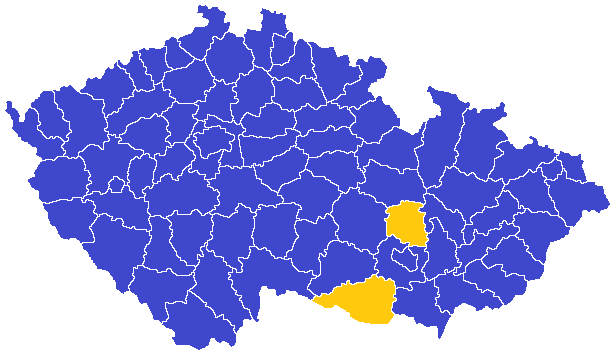
- Districts won by ODS-KDU coalition (blue) and HSD–SMS (yellow)
Prime Minister before election
Petr Pithart
OH
Prime Minister after election
Václav Klaus
ODS

National Council elections were held in the Czech part of Czechoslovakia on 5 and 6 June 1992, alongside federal elections. The result was a victory for the Civic Democratic Party–Christian Democratic Party alliance, which won 76 of the 200 seats. Voter turnout was 85.0%. When the Czech Republic became independent in 1993, the National Council became its Parliament.

== Campaign ==
Campaign of the Civic Democratic Party revolved around its leader Václav Klaus. The party used slogan "Future is in your hands. The whole campaign cost over 100 million CSK. It is described as very massive.

=== Finances ===
Party	Money spent (Kčs)
Civic Democratic Party	120,000,000
Christian and Democratic Union – Czechoslovak People's Party	17,000,000

== Opinion polls ==
Date	Polling Firm	ODS	ČSSD	KSČM	KDU-ČSL	LSU	OH	HSD-SMS	ODA	SPR-RSČ	KDS	ČSS	Others	Undecided
1/1992	IVVM	20.8	10.3	6.8	5.1	4.5	4.3	3.1	3.0	3.0	1.7	0.9	6.3	30.3
2/1992	IVVM	29.4	12.0	12.7	9.0	8.0	5.2	5.6	5.6	3.5	2.8	1.0	5.4	0
3/1992	IVVM	27.5	10.7	11.8	7.4	5.5	5.5	4.8	7.0	4.8	2.2	1.7	0.7	0
5/1992	IVVM	21.2	13.0	11.8	6.9	1.2	7.9	6.7	14.1	5.3	w.ODS	1.8	10.2	0
6/1992	Election	29.7	6.5	14.0	6.3	6.5	4.6	5.9	5.9	6.0	w.ODS	w.SZ	14.6	0
Source: Nesstar

== Results ==
Party	Votes	%	Seats
Civic Democratic Party–Christian Democratic Party	1,924,483	29.73	76
Communist Party of Bohemia and Moravia	909,490	14.05	35
Czechoslovak Social Democracy	422,736	6.53	16
Liberal-Social Union	421,988	6.52	16
KDU-ČSL	406,341	6.28	15
Rally for the Republic – Republican Party of Czechoslovakia	387,026	5.98	14
Civic Democratic Alliance	383,705	5.93	14
Movement for Autonomous Democracy–Party for Moravia and Silesia	380,088	5.87	14
Civic Movement	297,406	4.59	0
Pensioners for Life Security	244,319	3.77	0
Czechoslovak Businessmen's, Traders' and Farmers' Party	203,654	3.15	0
Club of Committed Non-Party Members	174,006	2.69	0
Independent Initiative	88,823	1.37	0
Friends of Beer Party	83,959	1.30	0
Movement for Social Justice	69,621	1.08	0
Democrats 92 for a Common State	37,839	0.58	0
Roma Civic Initiative	16,854	0.26	0
Republican Party and National Democratic Unity	11,115	0.17	0
National Social Party – Czechoslovak National Socialist Party	9,797	0.15	0
Total	6,473,250	100.00	200
Valid votes	6,473,250	98.44	
Invalid/blank votes	102,776	1.56	
Total votes	6,576,026	100.00	
Registered voters/turnout	7,738,981	84.97	
Source: Nohlen & Stöver
