= Tomáš Ježek (economist) =

Czech economist and politician

Tomáš Ježek (15 March 1940 – 29 November 2017) was a Czech economist and politician who served on the Czech National Council from 1990 to 1992. Concurrently, he was also minister responsible for privatization under Petr Pithart. Between 1993 and 1996, Ježek was a member of the Chamber of Deputies.

Ježek was born in Plzeň on 15 March 1940. His father, a teacher, was killed by the Gestapo when Ježek was five years old. Ježek later graduated from the Prague School of Economics. Václav Klaus, Dušan Tříska, and Ježek became known for their strong support of privatization. In 1989, Ježek helped establish the Civic Democratic Alliance (ODA). He won election to the Czech National Council in 1990, representing the Civic Forum. Also that year, Ježek was named a minister without portfolio by Petr Pithart, a position from which he continued to back privatization. Reelected to the National Council's successive legislative body in 1992 under the ODA banner, Ježek defected to the Civic Democratic Party (ODS) in 1995. He left the Chamber of Deputies upon the end of his term in 1996 and returned to teach at his alma mater. Ježek withdrew from the ODA in 1997, and subsequently ran for Senate twice. He died at the age of 77 on 29 November 2017.
