= František Pitra =

Czechoslovak politician (1932–2018)

František Pitra (13 November 1932 – 2 January 2018) was the Prime Minister of the Czech Socialist Republic (then part of Czechoslovakia) from October 11, 1988, through February 6, 1990. Like his four predecessors, he was a member of the Communist Party of Czechoslovakia. Pitra attended an agricultural engineer in the years 1951–1955 graduated from the University of Agriculture in Brno. He obtained his degree in agricultural engineer from the University of Agriculture in Brno (today Mendel University in Brno).
