= Josef Korčák =

Czech politician (1921–2008)

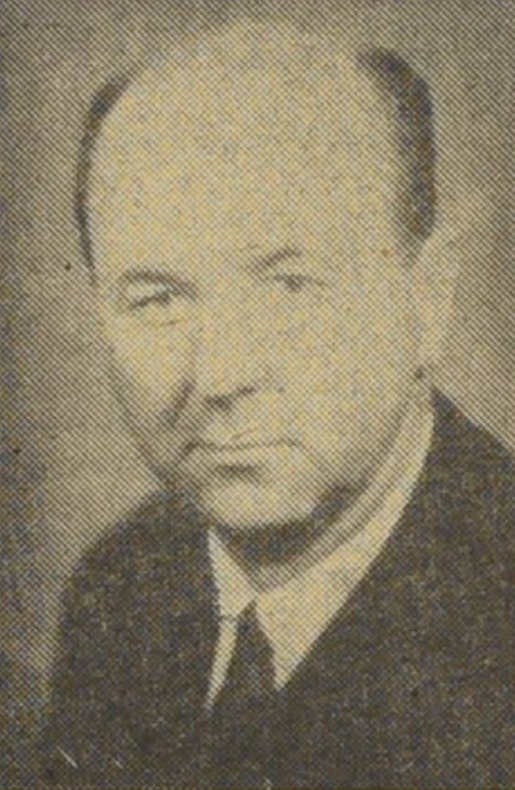

3rd Prime Minister of the Czech Socialist Republic
- In office 28 January 1970 – 20 March 1987
- Preceded by: Josef Kempný
- Succeeded by: Ladislav Adamec

Personal details
- Born: 17 December 1921 Holštejn, Czechoslovakia
- Died: 5 October 2008 (aged 86)
- Party: KSČ

Josef Korčák (17 December 1921 – 5 October 2008) was a Czech politician who served as the Prime Minister of the Czech Socialist Republic from 1970 to 1987. He was the longest-serving prime minister of the Czech Republic.

== Biography ==
He was born in Holštejn. He became a metal-turner. He worked in the Brno armory from 1937 to 1948. In 1948, he became active in politics.

He became prime minister in 1970 when he replaced Josef Kempný. He remained in this position until 1987, when he was replaced by Ladislav Adamec. Kočák was excluded from KSČ in 1990. He died in 2008.
