= Czech National Council =

Former legislative body of the Czech Republic

Czech National Council Česká národní rada
- Legislative body of the Czech Republic in Czechoslovakia

Type
- Type: Unicameral

History
- Established: 1969
- Disbanded: 1992
- Succeeded by: Chamber of Deputies (Czech Republic)
- Seats: 200 members (1969–1992)

Elections
- Voting system: Indirect non-competitive elections (1969–1971); Direct non-competitive elections (1971–1990); Direct competitive proportional representation (1990–1992)
- Last election: 5–6 June 1992

Meeting place
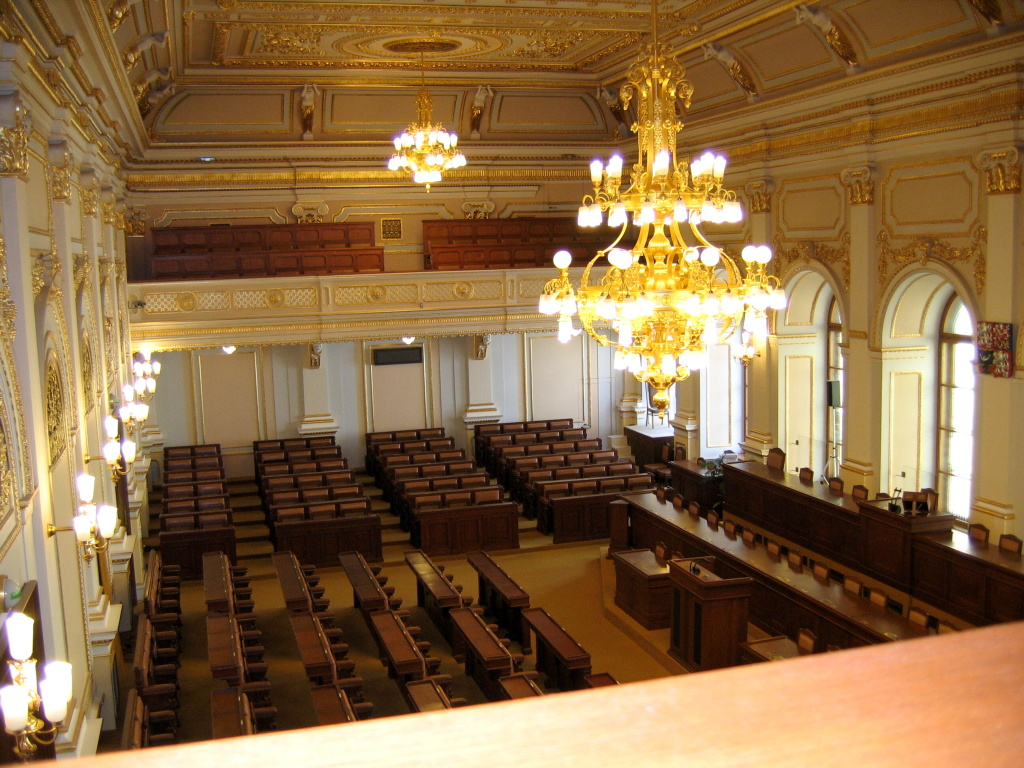
- Thun Palace, Prague

The Czech National Council (Czech: Česká národní rada, ČNR) was the legislative body of the Czech Republic from 1968, when it was created as a member state of Czechoslovakia, until 1992, when it was legally transformed into the Chamber of Deputies according to the Constitution (Act. No. 1/1993 Coll.) after the dissolution of Czechoslovakia.

== Chairmen of the Czech National Council ==
1. Čestmír Císař 1968–1969
2. Evžen Erban 1969–1981
3. Josef Kempný 1981–1989
4. Jaroslav Šafařík 1989–1990
5. Dagmar Burešová 1990–1992
6. Milan Uhde 1992–1992

== See also ==
- Slovak National Council
- Federal Assembly (Czechoslovakia)
