= 2000 President of the Senate of the Czech Republic election =

- 19 December 2000
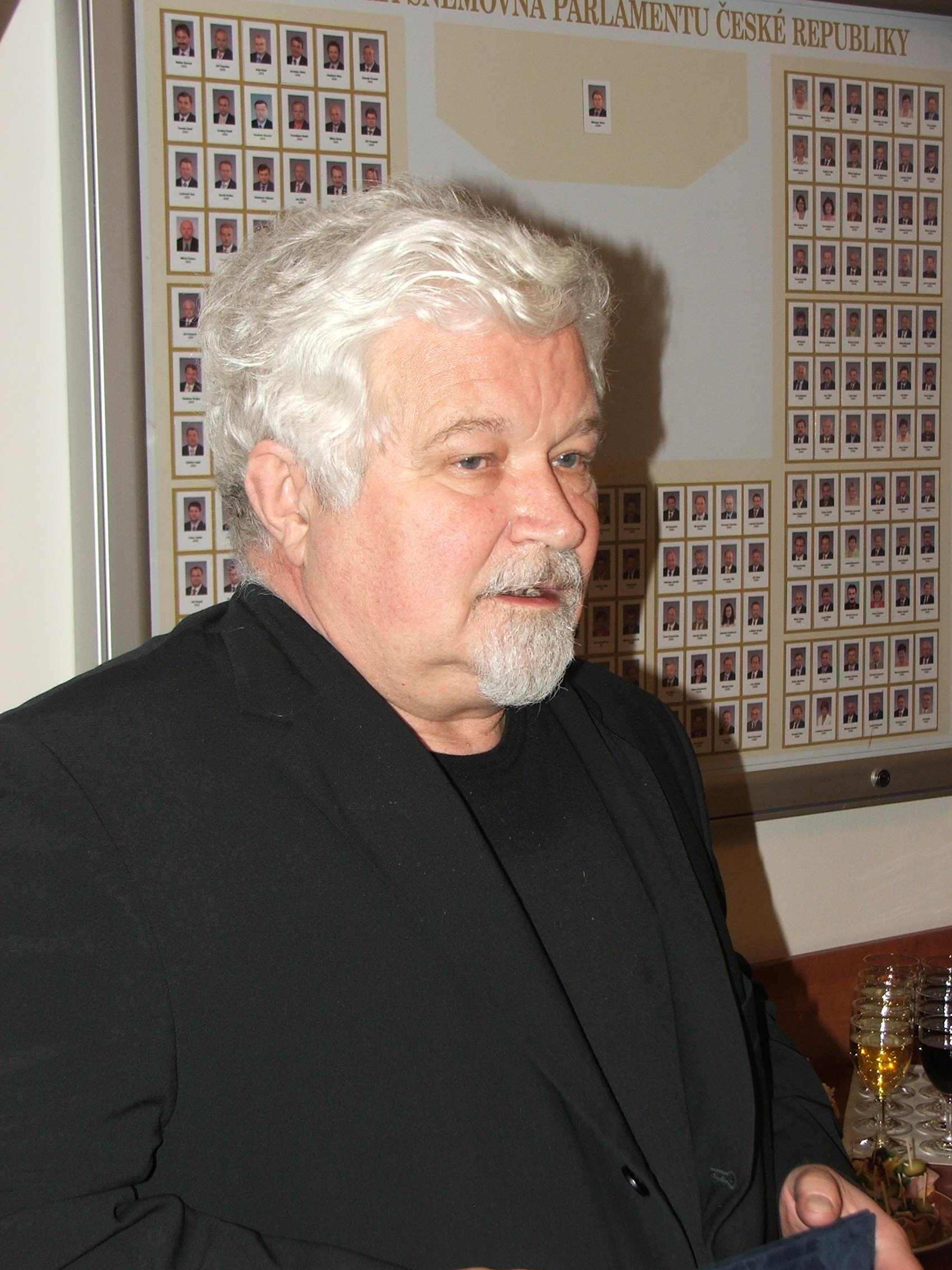
Candidate	Petr Pithart
Party	Christian and Democratic Union – Czechoslovak People's Party
Popular vote	50
Percentage	63.3%
President before election
Ivan Havlíček (acting)
ČSSD
Elected President
Petr Pithart
Christian and Democratic Union – Czechoslovak People's Party

An election of the President of the Senate of the Czech Republic was held on 16 December 2000. Petr Pithart was elected the new President of the Senate.

== Background and voting ==
Four-Coalition was successful in the 2000 senate election. Four-Coalition decided to nominate a candidate for the Senate position of President. The Christian and Democratic Union – Czechoslovak People's Party suggested either Petr Pithart or Zuzana Roithová. The Freedom Union supported Josef Zieleniec, and the Civic Democratic Alliance suggested Josef Jařab. The Four-Coalition faction eventually nominated Pithart who narrowly beat Zieleniec in a vote within the Four-Coalition Senate faction.

The election was held on 19 December 2000 with Pithart as the only candidate. He received 50 of the 79 votes.
