= 1998 President of the Senate of the Czech Republic election =

- 16 December 1998
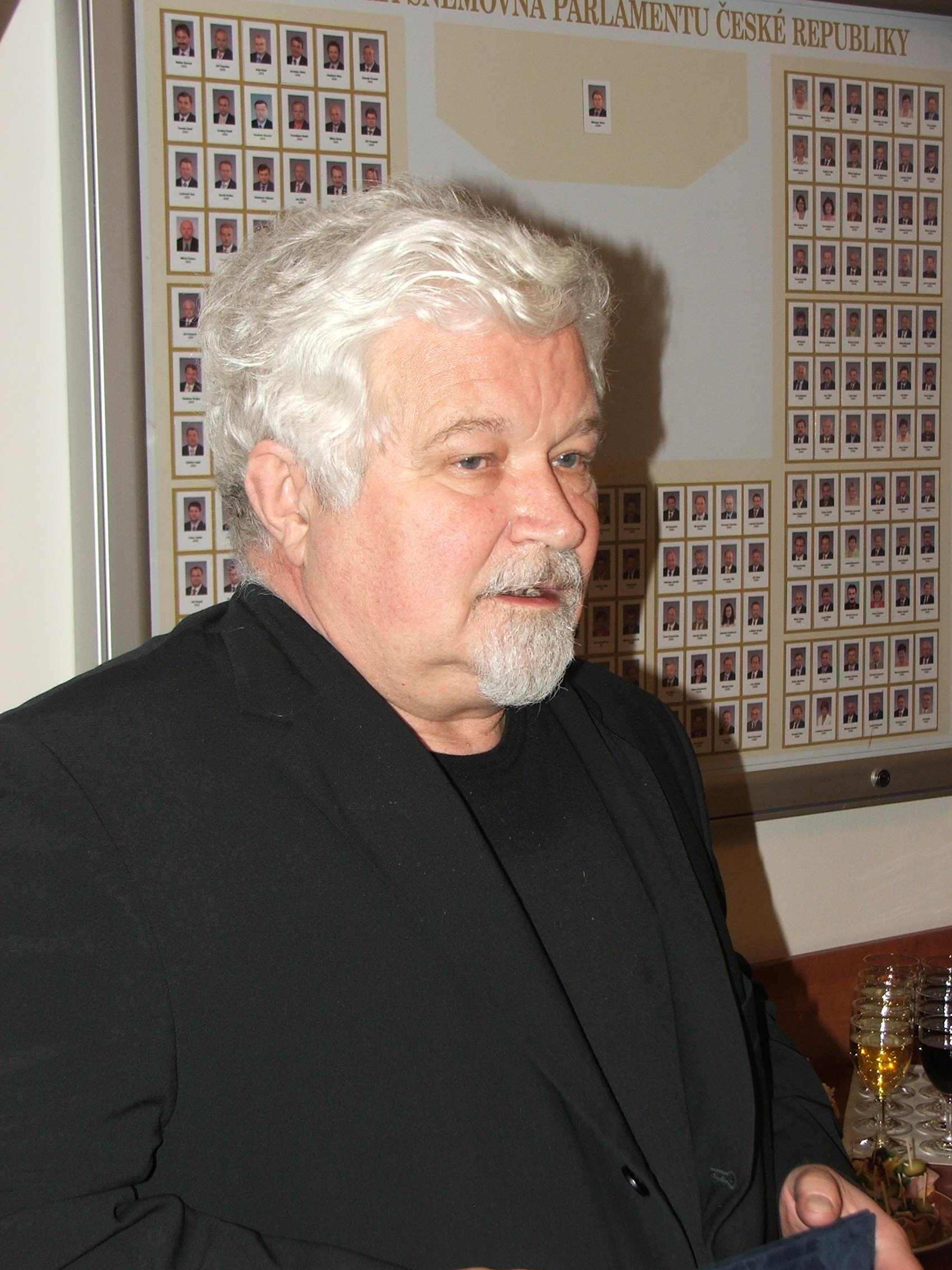
Candidate	Libuše Benešová	Petr Pithart
Party	ODS	Christian and Democratic Union – Czechoslovak People's Party
Popular vote	40	37
Percentage	50.63%	46.84%
President before election
Petr Pithart
Christian and Democratic Union – Czechoslovak People's Party (KDU–ČSL)
Elected President
Libuše Benešová
Civic Democratic Party (ODS)

An election of the President of the Senate of the Czech Republic was held on 16 December 1998. Libuše Benešová was elected the new President, defeating the incumbent Petr Pithart.

== Background ==
The 1998 Senate election results were positive for the Christian and Democratic Union – Czechoslovak People's Party (KDU-CSL) and the Civic Democratic Party (ODS). ODS and the Czech Social Democratic Party (ČSSD) had formed the Opposition Agreement, and agreed to support a joint candidate. Dagmar Lastovecká was the original suggested candidate, but her mandate as senator was questioned in court, so ODS selected Libuše Benešová instead. Four-Coalition (KDU-CSL, the Civic Democratic Alliance (CDA) and Freedom Union) endorsed the incumbent President Petr Pithart.

== Voting ==
The election was held on 16 December 1998. ODS nominated Benešová while KDU-CSL, CDA, and the Freedom Union nominated Pithart. 79 Senators were present, and the quorum was 40 votes. Benešová also had support of ČSSD, and stated that she would like to win votes from other parties than ODS and ČSSD. In the first round, Pithart received 37 votes and Benešová 36, with six votes invalid. The first round results led to speculation that some Social Democrats had supported Pithart, which was confirmed by Ivan Havlíček. Pithart himself did not vote. In the second round, Benešová received 40 votes, Pithart 37 and two votes were invalid, and Benešová therefore became the new President.

Round	Benešová	Pithart	Invalid
1st	36	37	6
2nd	40	37	2

== Aftermath ==
Benešová stated she was happy to be elected and appreciated the support from Senators. Pithart said he was not disappointed and described his result as an "honourable loss".

Benešová remained as the President until the 2000 Senate elections, when she lost her Senate seat. Ivan Havlíček became acting President of the Senate until eventually Pithart was elected as the next President.
