= Senate district 44 – Chrudim =

Electoral district in the Czech Republic

44 – Chrudim
- inline Senate district of the Czech Republic

- The Chrudim district on a map
- Senator: Jan Tecl; ODS
- Region: Pardubice; Vysočina
- District: Chrudim; Havlíčkův Brod
- Last election: 2024
- Next election: 2030

Senate district 44 – Chrudim is an electoral district of the Senate of the Czech Republic, located in part of the Chrudim District and the south-eastern part of the Havlíčkův Brod District. Since 2018, the Senator for the district is Jan Tecl.

== Senators ==
Year	Senator	Nominating party
1996 (Note: Election for shortened four-year term)	Petr Pithart	KDU-ČSL
2000	Petr Pithart	KDU-ČSL
2006	Petr Pithart	KDU-ČSL
2012	Jan Veleba	Independent
2018	Jan Tecl	ODS
2024	Jan Tecl	ODS

== Election results ==
=== 1996 ===
1996 Czech Senate election in Chrudim
Candidate	Party	1st round		2nd round	
Candidate	Party	Votes	%	Votes	%
Petr Pithart	KDU-ČSL	12 241	29.90	20 318	61.70
Václav Jozefy	ODS	12 837	31.36	12 610	38.30
Ladislav Rymeš	ČSSD	7 275	17.77	—	—
Jaroslav Žežulka	KSČM	6 778	16.56	—	—
Petr Řezníček	ČSNS	1 802	4.40	—	—

=== 2000 ===
2000 Czech Senate election in Chrudim
Candidate	Party	1st round		2nd round	
Candidate	Party	Votes	%	Votes	%
Petr Pithart	KDU-ČSL, 4KOALICE	17 085	41.64	14 626	64.78
Petr Štěpánek	ODS	9 048	22.05	7 950	35.21
Milan Bičík	KSČM	6 579	16.03	—	—
Miroslav Šlouf	ČSSD	4 282	10.43	—	—
Stanislav Pecka	Independent	3 173	7.73	—	—
Stanislav Římek	Independent	855	2.08	—	—

=== 2006 ===
2006 Czech Senate election in Chrudim
Candidate	Party	1st round		2nd round	
Candidate	Party	Votes	%	Votes	%
Petr Pithart	KDU-ČSL	14 779	30.65	12 025	50.04
Jana Fischerová	ODS	16 620	34.47	12 001	49.95
Jaroslav Trávníček	ČSSD	7 051	14.62	—	—
Jiří Šimek	KSČM	5 971	12.38	—	—
Stanislav Pecka	SV SOS	3 401	7.05	—	—
Jaroslav Kolář	SP	230	0.47	—	—
Karel Ledvinka	KONS	157	0.32	—	—

=== 2012 ===
2012 Czech Senate election in Chrudim
Candidate	Party	1st round		2nd round	
Candidate	Party	Votes	%	Votes	%
Jan Veleba	Independent	8 843	20.97	13 500	59.73
Tomáš Škaryd	ČSSD	7 339	17.40	9 100	40.26
Milan Plodík	KSČM	7 127	16.90	—	—
Magda Křivanová	ODS	4 542	10.77	—	—
David Kasal	Independent	4 466	10.56	—	—
Petr Řezníček	SNK ED	3 786	8.97	—	—
Emanuel Žďárský	Independent	2 953	7.00	—	—
Petr Lichtenberg	Svobodní	1 381	3.27	—	—
Marta Ledererová	Suverenity	1 083	2.56	—	—
Zdeněk Juračka	TOP 09, STAN	646	1.53	—	—

=== 2018 ===
2018 Czech Senate election in Chrudim
Candidate	Party	1st round		2nd round	
Candidate	Party	Votes	%	Votes	%
Jan Tecl	ODS, STAN, STO	7 740	15.44	13 435	63.89
Daniel Herman	KDU-ČSL	7 586	15.13	7 591	36.10
Miroslav Krčil	Independent	5 789	11.55	—	—
Lucie Orgoníková	ČSSD	4 985	9.94	—	—
Tomáš Dubský	Independent	4 906	9.78	—	—
Petr Novák	ANO 2011	3 711	7.40	—	—
Hynek Blaško	SPD	3 185	6.35	—	—
Jaroslav Hájek	KSČM	2 789	5.56	—	—
Vladimír Martinec	SNK ED, Freeholders	2 306	4.60	—	—
Pavel Svoboda	FOR Health	2 104	4.19	—	—
Emanuel Žďárský	OL	2 010	4.01	—	—
Roman Šemík	Pirates	1 915	3.82	—	—
Jiří Hynek	REAL	907	1.80	—	—
Augustin Karel Andrle Sylor	KČ	181	0.36	—	—

=== 2024 ===
2024 Czech Senate election in Chrudim
Candidate	Party	1st round		2nd round	
Candidate	Party	Votes	%	Votes	%
Jan Tecl	ODS, KDU-ČSL, STAN, TOP 09, STO	11 189	30.97	10 878	52.00
Vladimír Slávka	ANO 2011	10 663	29.51	10 041	47.99
Miroslav Krčil	SproK	7 358		—	—
Roman Málek	LES	3 855		—	—
Milan Chaloupecký	SPD, Tricolour	3 058		—	—
