= List of presidents of the Senate of the Czech Republic =

This is a complete list of the presidents of the Senate of the Czech Republic.

Name	Portrait	Entered office	Left office	Political party	Notes
Petr Pithart		18 December 1996	16 December 1998	KDU-ČSL	
Libuše Benešová		16 December 1998	23 November 2000	ODS	
Ivan Havlíček (acting)		23 November 2000	19 December 2000	ČSSD	
Petr Pithart		19 December 2000	15 December 2004	KDU-ČSL	
Přemysl Sobotka		15 December 2004	13 November 2010	ODS	
Milan Štěch		24 November 2010	1 October 2014	ČSSD	
Zdeněk Škromach (acting)		1 October 2014	19 November 2014	ČSSD	
Milan Štěch		19 November 2014	14 November 2018	ČSSD	
Jaroslav Kubera		14 November 2018	20 January 2020	ODS	
Jiří Růžička (acting)		20 January 2020	19 February 2020	TOP 09	
Miloš Vystrčil		19 February 2020	incumbent	ODS	

== See also ==
- Senate of the Czech Republic
