= 1996 President of the Senate of the Czech Republic election =

- 18 December 1996
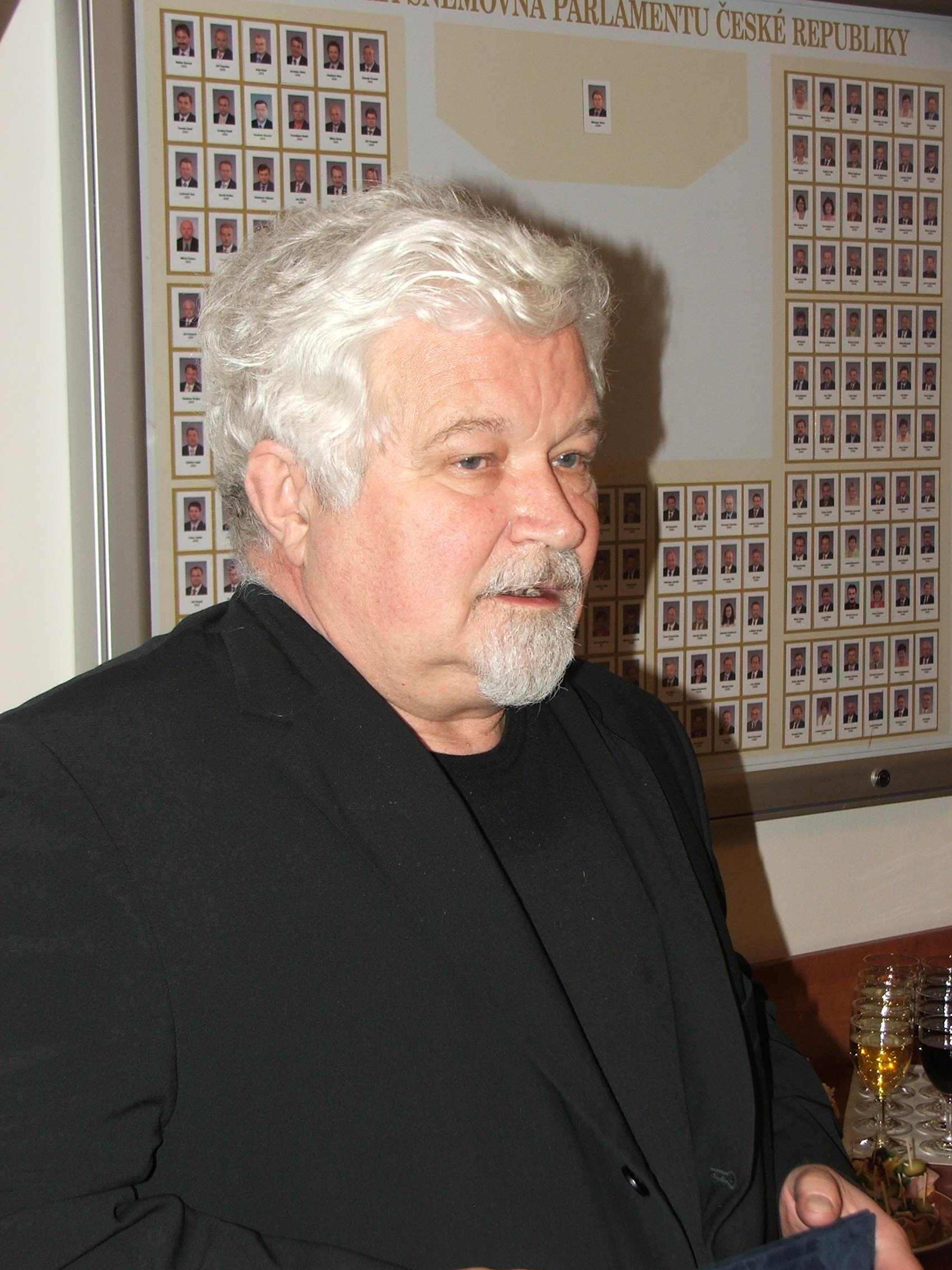
Candidate	Petr Pithart
Party	Christian and Democratic Union – Czechoslovak People's Party
Popular vote	41
Percentage	50.62%
Elected President
Petr Pithart
Christian and Democratic Union – Czechoslovak People's Party (KDU–ČSL)

An election of the President of the Senate of the Czech Republic was held on 18 December 1996. Petr Pithart was elected the first President of the Senate. Pithart was a candidate of the Christian and Democratic Union – Czechoslovak People's Party (KDU-CSL), and his election was opposed primarily by the Civic Democratic Party.

== Background ==
The first election of Senate was held in November 1996. The Civic Democratic Party (ODS) emerged as the strongest party with the Social Democrats second. The first meeting was held on 18 December 1996 to elect the President, presided over by Jan Musial. KDU-CSL, the third strongest party, nominated Petr Pithart for the position. KDU-CSL were part of the governing coalition with ODS and the Civic Democratic Alliance. Both parties suggested that the coalition should nominate a common candidate, but Pithart was unacceptable for both parties.

== Voting ==
The election was held on 19 December 1996. Pithart was the only nominee. Senator Václav Benda attacked Pithart's past before the voting started. He stated that Pithart had written a series of articles in 1979 in which he attacked some dissidents who were in prison and unable to defend themselves. Pithart needed 41 votes to be elected, but received only 39 votes in the first round. This triggered a debate over whether a second round should be held in the case of only one candidate, and it was decided to hold the second round. Pithart was narrowly elected with 41 votes.

Round	Pithart	Against/Invalid
1st	39	42
2nd	41	40

== Aftermath ==
Pithart became the first President of the senate. He stayed in the position until 1998 when he was replaced by Libuše Benešová.
