= Jan Veleba =

Jan Veleba may refer to:

- Jan Veleba (athlete)
- Jan Veleba (politician)
