= 2002 President of the Senate of the Czech Republic election =

- 4 December 2002
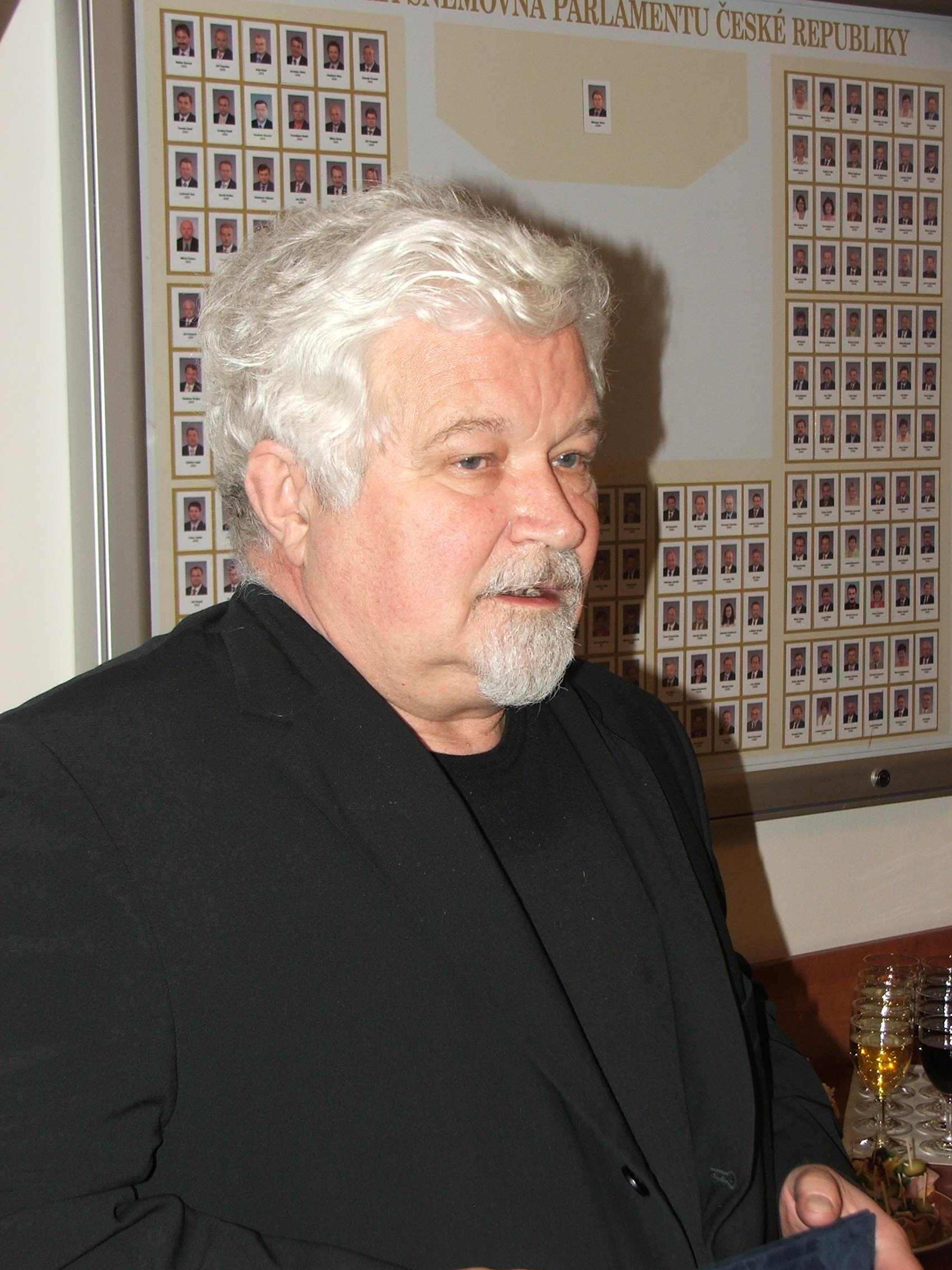
Candidate	Petr Pithart
Party	Christian and Democratic Union – Czechoslovak People's Party
Popular vote	50
Percentage	61.7%
President before election
Petr Pithart
Christian and Democratic Union – Czechoslovak People's Party
Elected President
Petr Pithart
Christian and Democratic Union – Czechoslovak People's Party

An election of the President of the Senate of the Czech Republic was held on 4 December 2002. Petr Pithart was re-elected as the President of the Senate.

== Background and voting ==
2002 Senate election was won by the Civic Democratic Party. Independent candidates made gains. Candidates of governing coalition were heavily defeated.

Christian and Democratic Union – Czechoslovak People's Party decided to nominate the incumbent President Petr Pithart. He was also supported by the Czech Social Democratic Party, Freedom Union – Democratic Union and Independents. The Civic Democratic Party decided to not support Pithart but also didn't nominate its own candidate.

Election was held on 4 December 2002. Pithart received 50 votes of 81 and was elected.
