= Adriaen de Vries =

Dutch sculptor (c. 1556 – 1626)

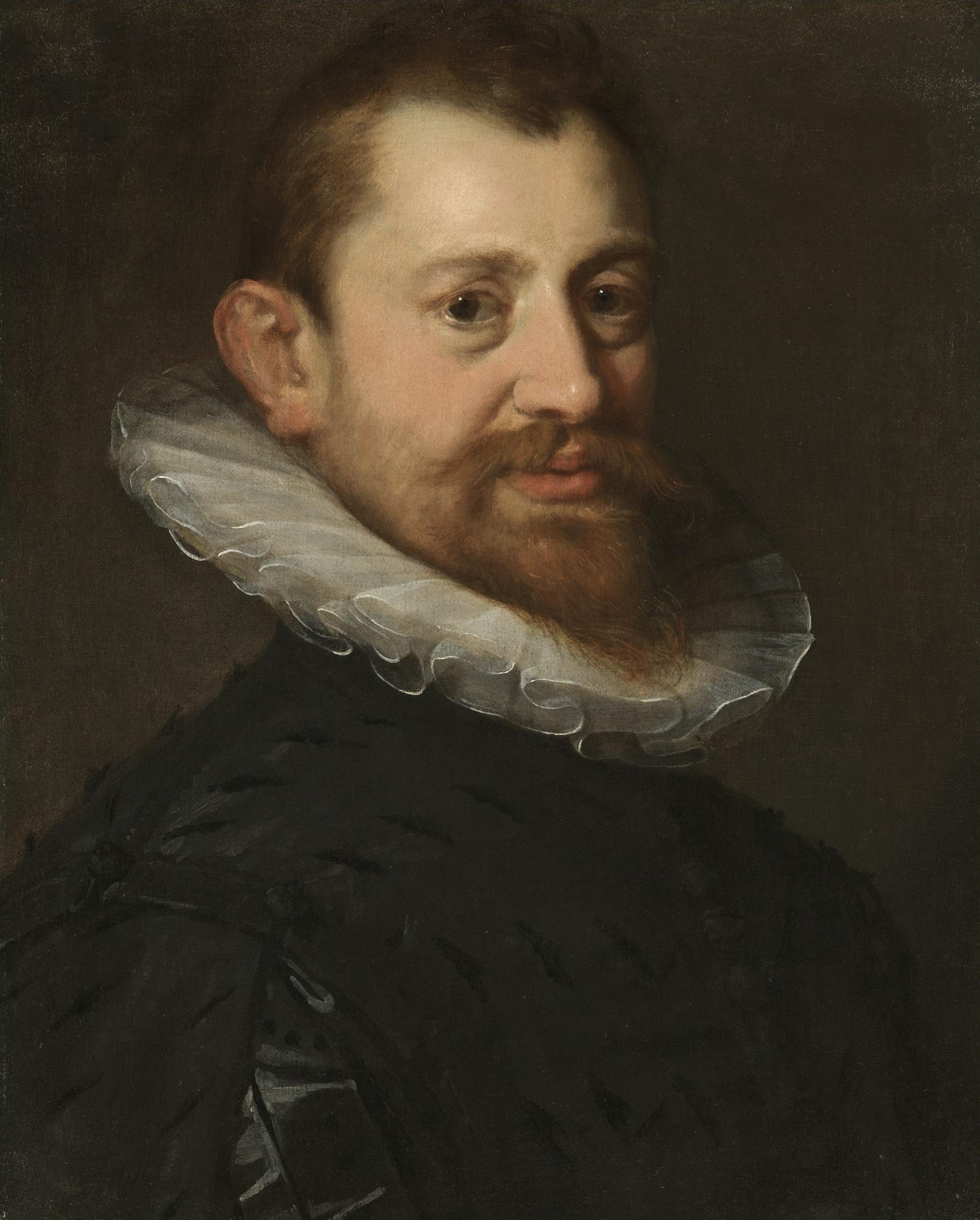
- Portrait by Hans von Aachen
- Born: Circa 1556; The Hague, Habsburg Netherlands
- Died: 1626; Prague, Kingdom of Bohemia
- Known for: Sculpting
- Style: Northern Mannerism

Adriaen de Vries (c. 1556 – 1626) was a Northern Mannerist sculptor born in the Netherlands but working in Central Europe, whose international style crossed the threshold to the Baroque; he excelled in refined modelling and bronze casting and in the manipulation of patina and became the most famous European sculptor of his generation. He also excelled in draughtsmanship.

Partly as a result of the disturbances of the Thirty Years' War, and also changes in style, Adriaen de Vries had no direct follower.

== Life ==
Born in The Hague to a patrician family, his early training is obscure; a recent suggestion suggests an apprenticeship with Willem Danielsz. van Tetrode, known in Italy as Guglielmo Fiammingo, a pupil of Benvenuto Cellini who had returned to the Netherlands. Another possibility is that he was apprenticed to a goldsmith, his brother-in-law Simon Adriaensz Rottermont. Both possibilities are suggestive in view of de Vries' virtuoso casting technique and refined finish.

=== Apprenticeship in Italy ===
He travelled to Florence, where, as early as 1581, he is documented working in the studio of the master Mannerist sculptor Giambologna, a Northerner like himself, and the greatest influence on his mature work. Three of the Virtues and some of the putti for Giambologna's Grimaldi Chapel, in San Francesco di Castelletto, Genoa (1579), have been attributed to Adriaen de Vries. In 1586, he was called to Milan to assist Pompeo, the son of the ailing Leone Leoni, whom he succeeded as master of one of Italy's largest bronze-casting studios; for Leoni de Vries provided three heroically scaled saints for Leoni's high altar at the basilica of San Lorenzo at the Escorial.

=== Commissions in Savoy and Germany ===
This led to his brief appointment as court sculptor to Philip II's son-in-law Charles Emmanuel I, Duke of Savoy in Turin. In 1589-94 he worked for the first time in Prague, making busts and reliefs for Emperor Rudolf II. These sculptures are now housed in Vienna and at the Victoria and Albert Museum, which possesses a bust of Rudolf in bas-relief. He left Prague in 1594 for a visit to study in Rome. On his return through Germany, he executed two fountains in 1596 for the city of Augsburg, the Mercury and Hercules and the Hydra fountains, which may still be seen in Maximilianstraße.

=== Return to Bohemia (after 1601) ===
De Vries returned in 1601 to Prague, where Rudolf made him Kammerbildhauer ("chamber sculptor", i.e., privileged artist). During his hypothetical stay in Rome in 1604, he had cast a statue of Christ at the column, a centrepiece for Adam von Hannewaldt's tomb monument in the Holy Trinity Church in Rothsürben (Żórawina), today in the National Museum in Warsaw. It was conceived as a part of a five figure group of the Flagellation of Christ. He remained in Prague after Rudolf's death in 1612, though the Imperial court returned to Vienna, until his own death in Prague in 1626.

During this late period he found a new patron in the Prince Karl of Liechtenstein and received sculpture commissions from several German sovereigns, such as from Ernst of Schaumburg for the resurrection group in Stadthagen mausoleum, today the only work of De Vries to be seen in its original situation; he was also commissioned to make a Neptune fountain for the gardens of the king of Denmark's royal palace, Frederiksborg (one of the statues from this fountain is now displayed in the Rijksmuseum).

== Works ==
The Rijksmuseum owns the only two sculptures by de Vries found in his native Netherlands, a bronze relief of Bacchus and Ariadne, and the recently purchased (2014) Bacchant. The artist was scarcely known there until the exhibition mounted by the Rijksmuseum, the Nationalmuseum, Stockholm, and the J. Paul Getty Museum in 1999. Fourteen sculptures, the largest collection of De Vries' work, are in Museum De Vries at Drottningholm Palace, opened in 2001. Their presence in Sweden is the result of the Sack of Prague in the last days of the Thirty Years' War, when the Swedes pillaged what remained of Rudolf's huge collections, and took a great many statues, in particular duke Albrecht von Wallenstein's garden statues, that used to adorn his palace on the Lesser Town (city quarter) of Prague. The originals, now to be found in Museum de Vries, are represented by bronze replicas at the Wallenstein Palace in Prague, now seat of the Czech senate. Another famous work by de Vries, also now at Drottningholm, was the Neptunus Fountain, made for Frederiksborg Palace in Denmark. These sculptures were also taken as prizes of war, during the Dano-Swedish War (1658–1660).

=== Gallery ===
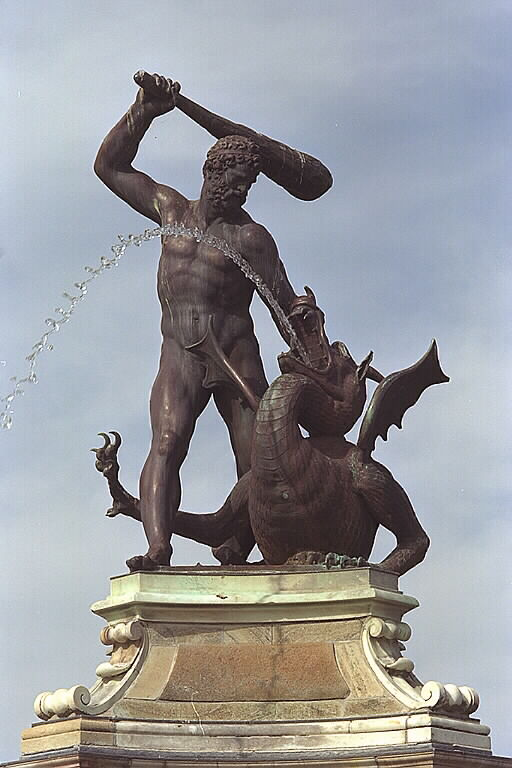
Hercules fountain, gardens of Drottningholm Palace

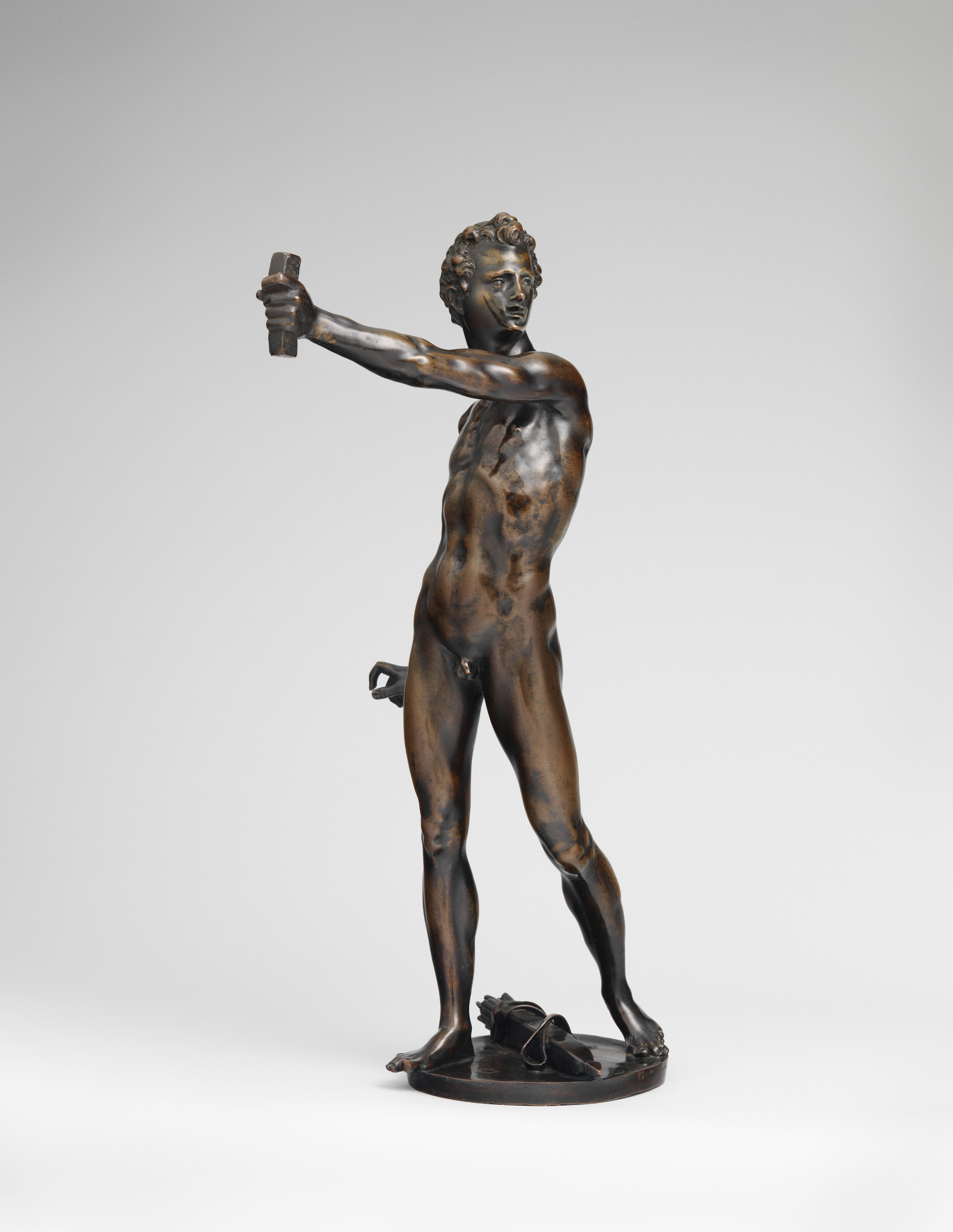
Apollo, c. 1594, Metropolitan Museum of Art

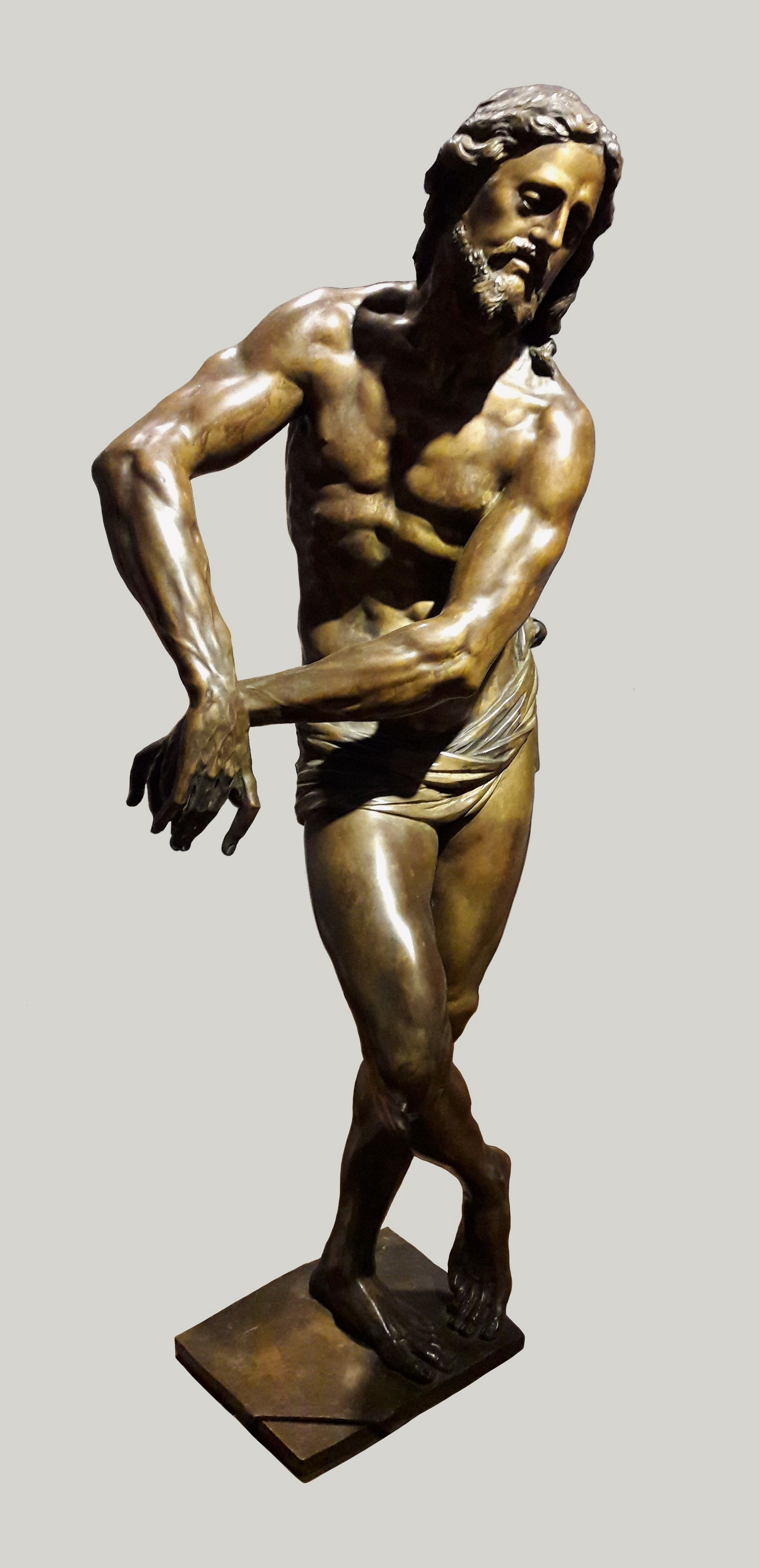
Christ at the Column, 1604, from Holy Trinity Church in Żórawina, National Museum in Warsaw

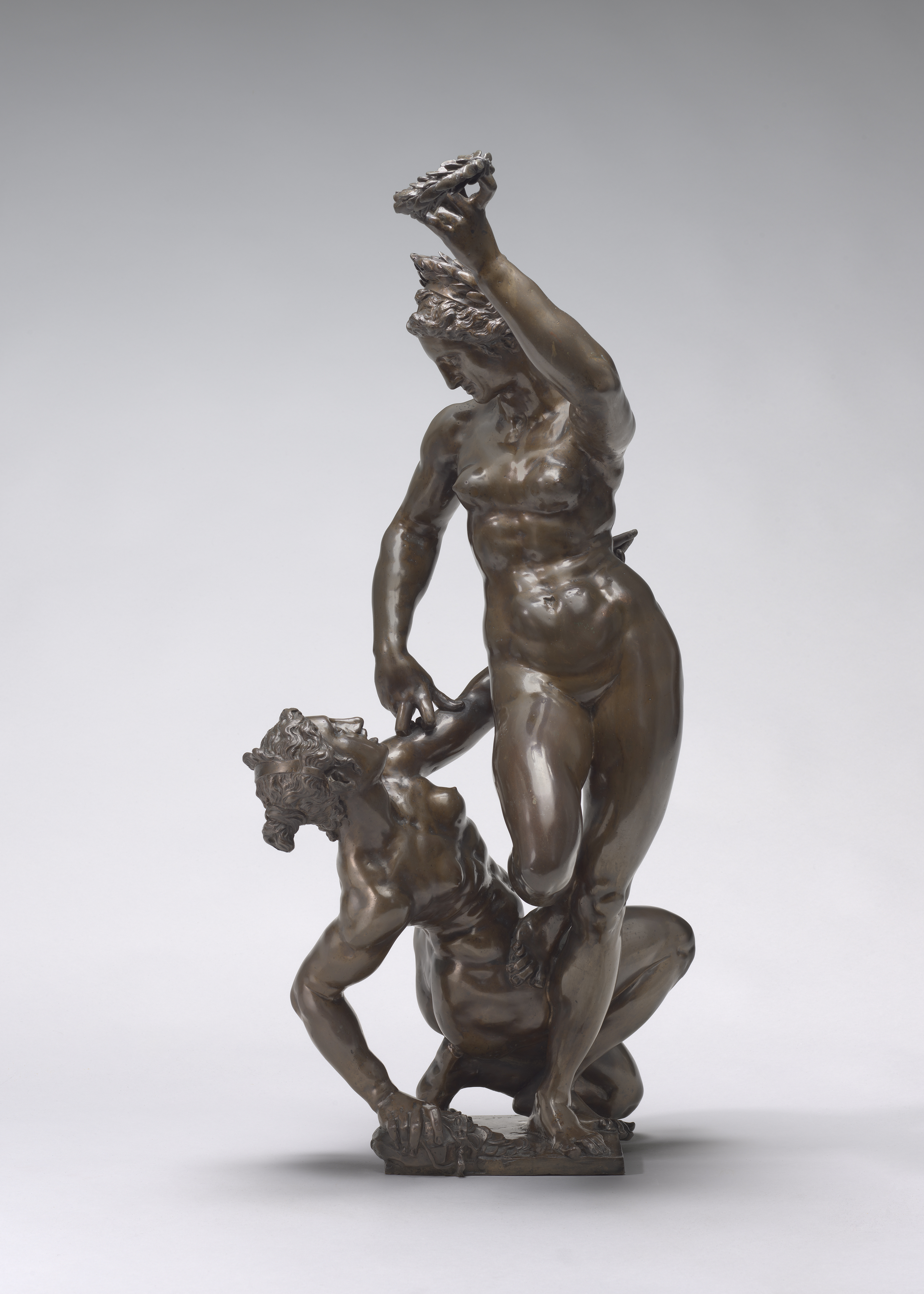
Empire Triumphant over Avarice, 1610, National Gallery of Art, Washington D.C.

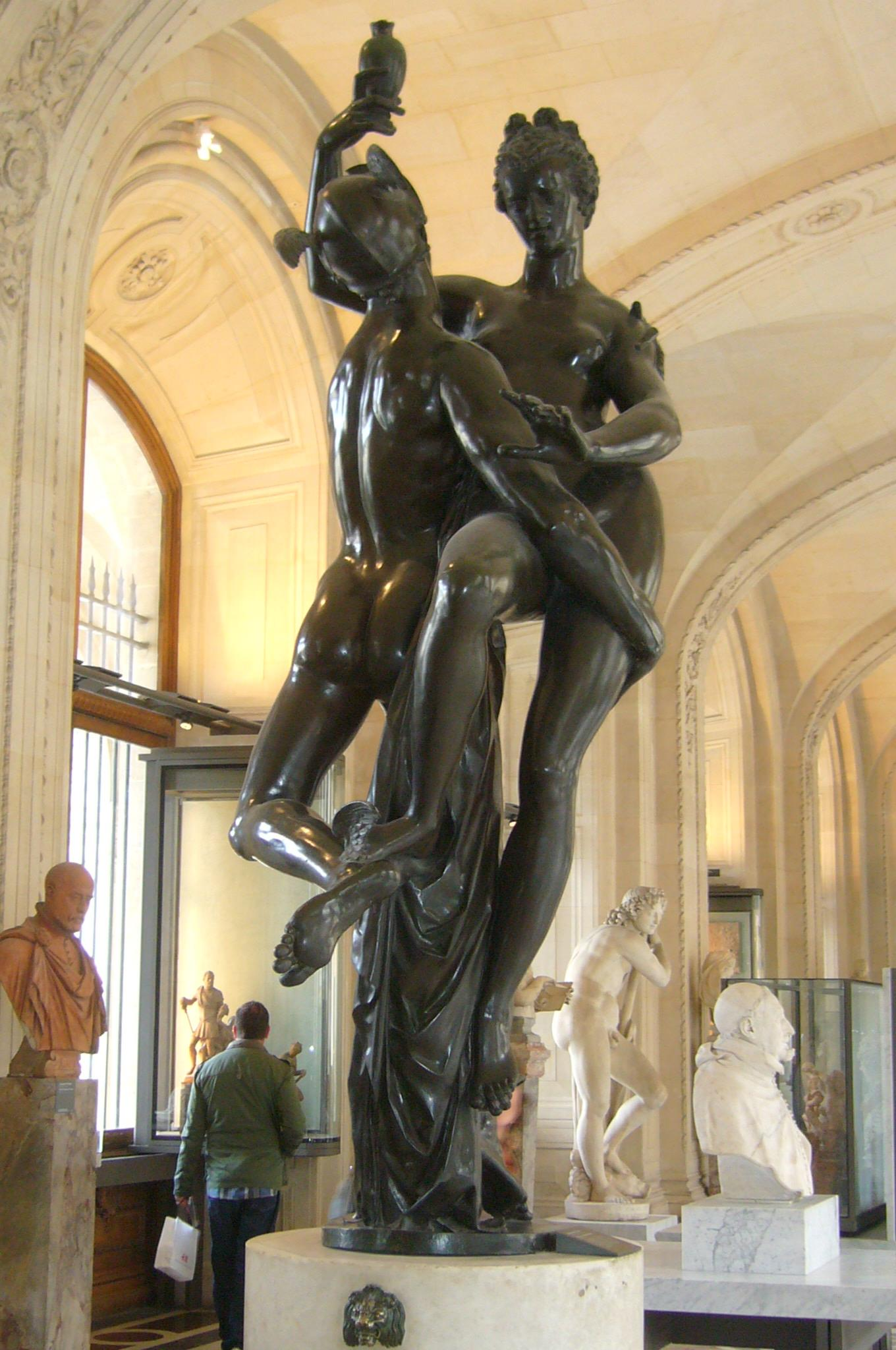
Mercury and Psyche, 1593, Musée du Louvre

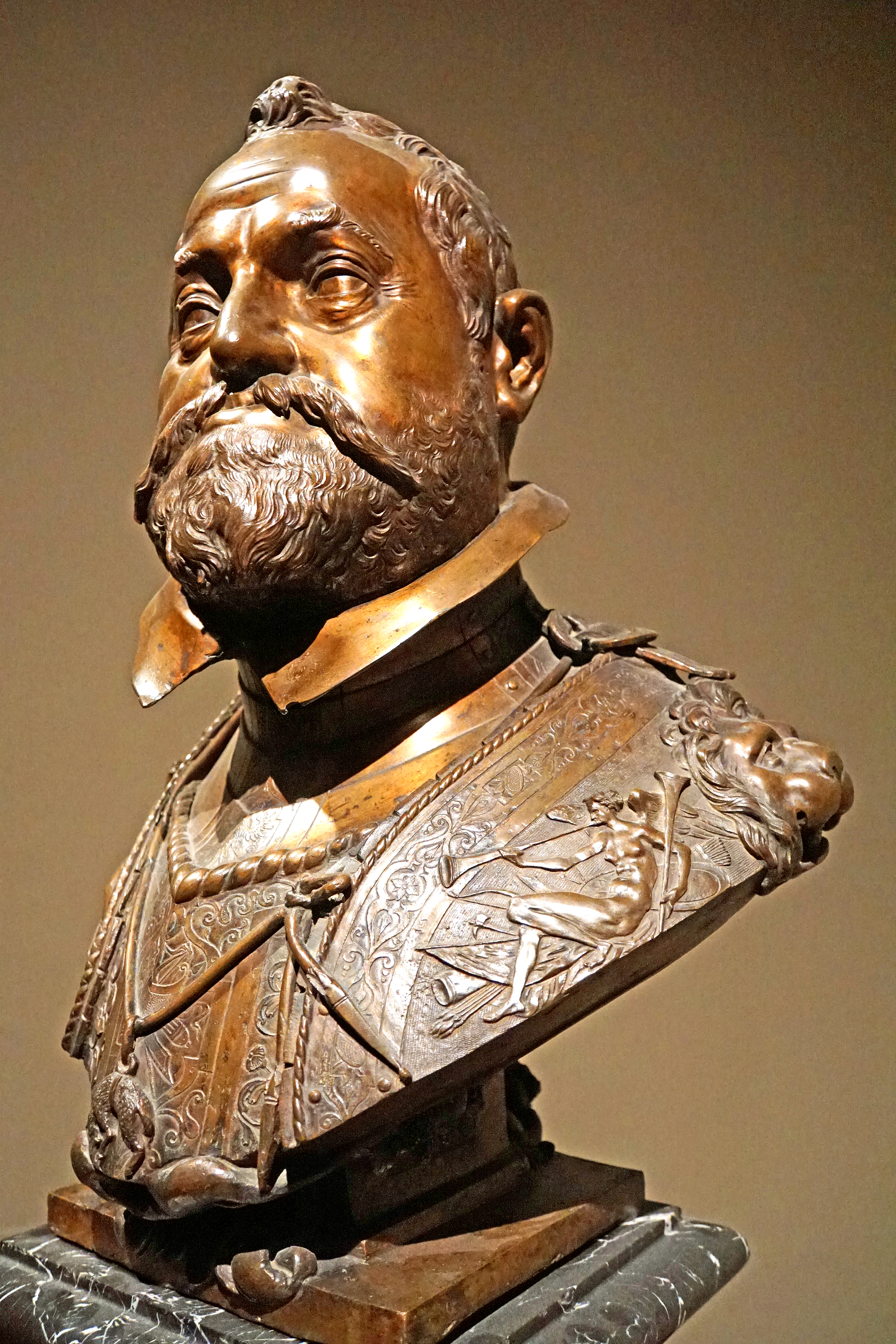
Bust of Emperor Rudolf II, 1607, Imperial Treasury, Vienna

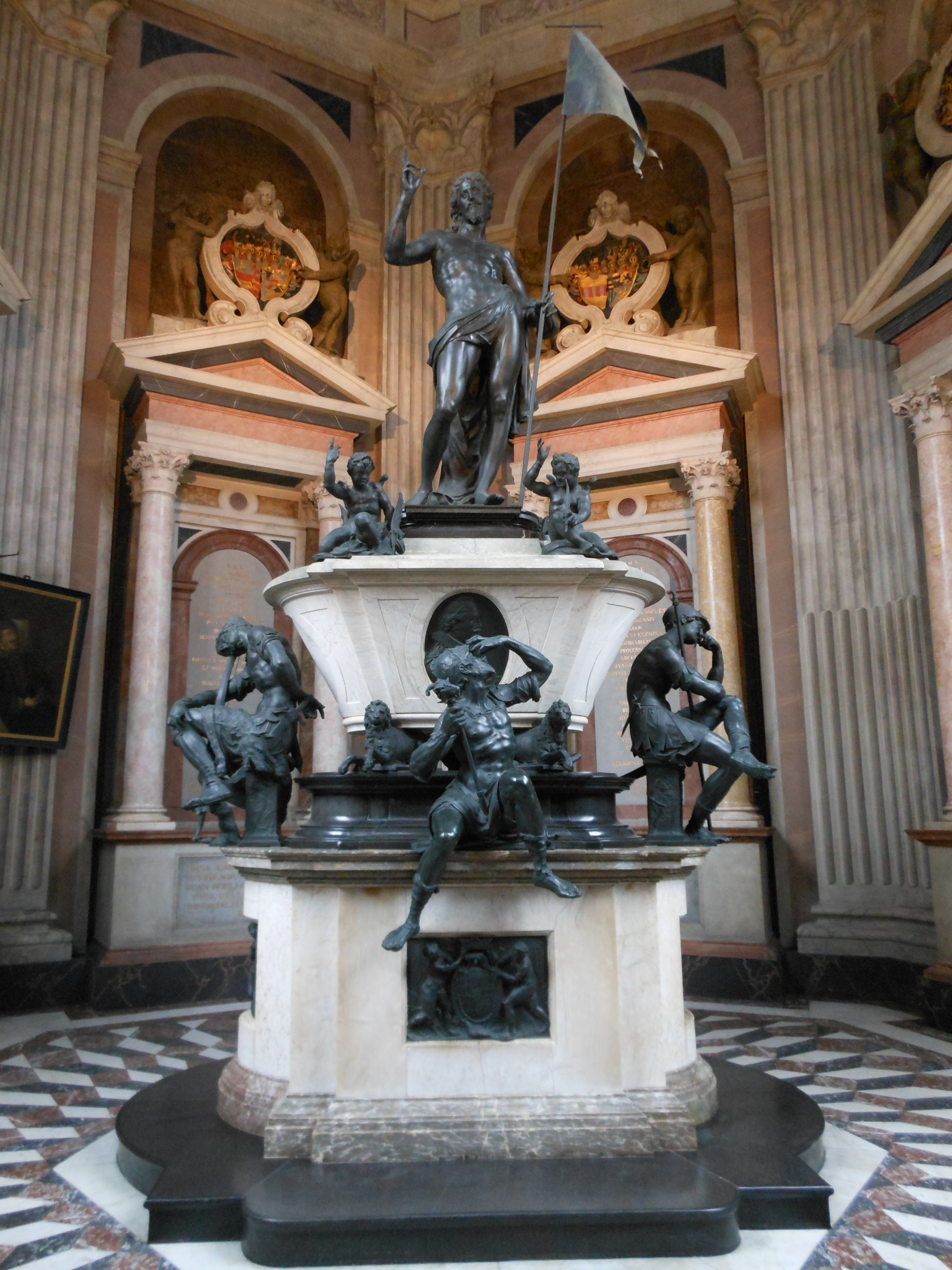
Resurrection monument (a cenotaph) in the Prince Ernst of Schaumburg's mausoleum, 1613–1620

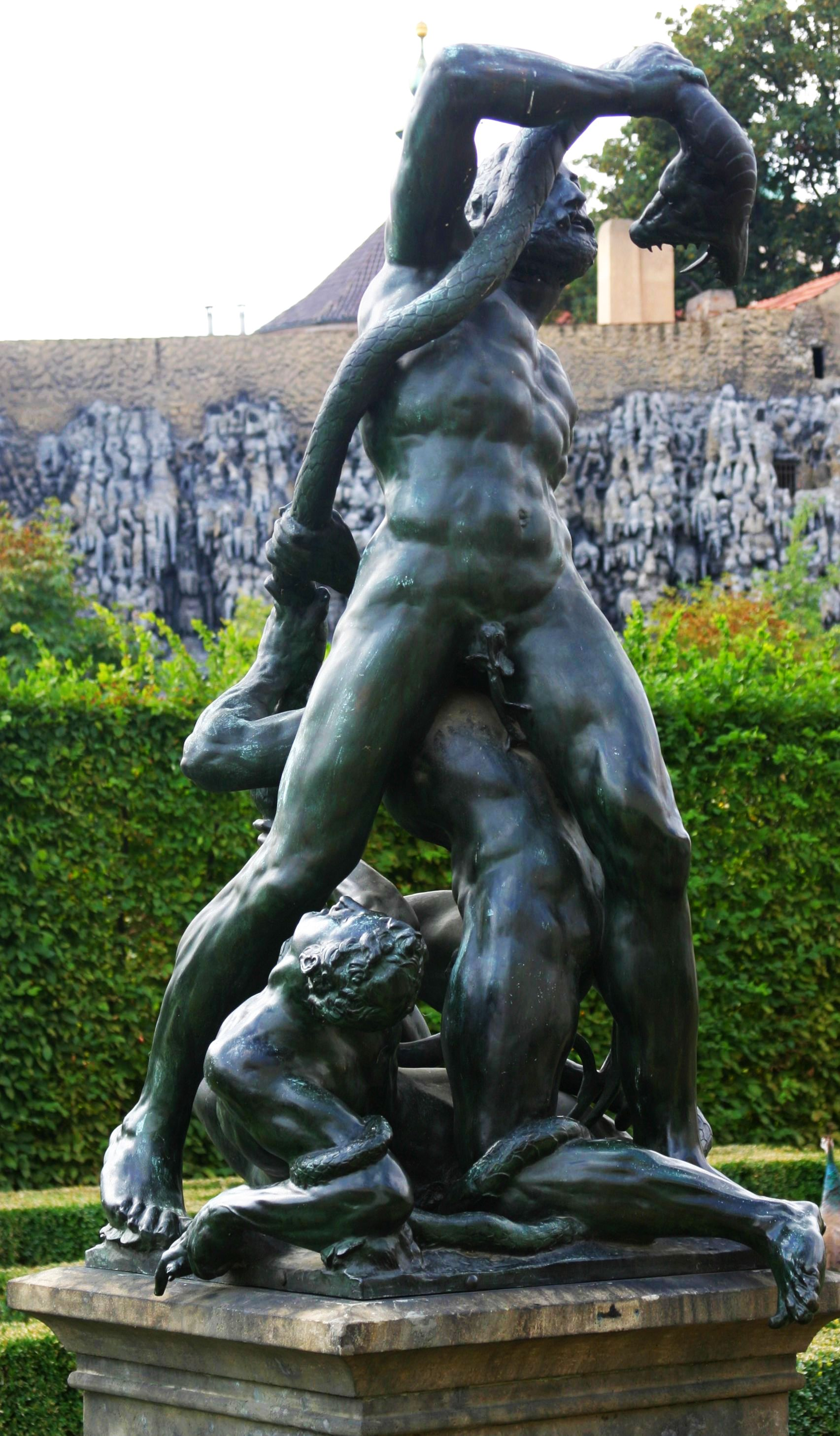
De Vries' reinterpretation of the Laocoön theme (1623), bronze replica in the Wallenstein Palace gardens, Prague
