= Luigi Baccio del Bianco =

Italian painter

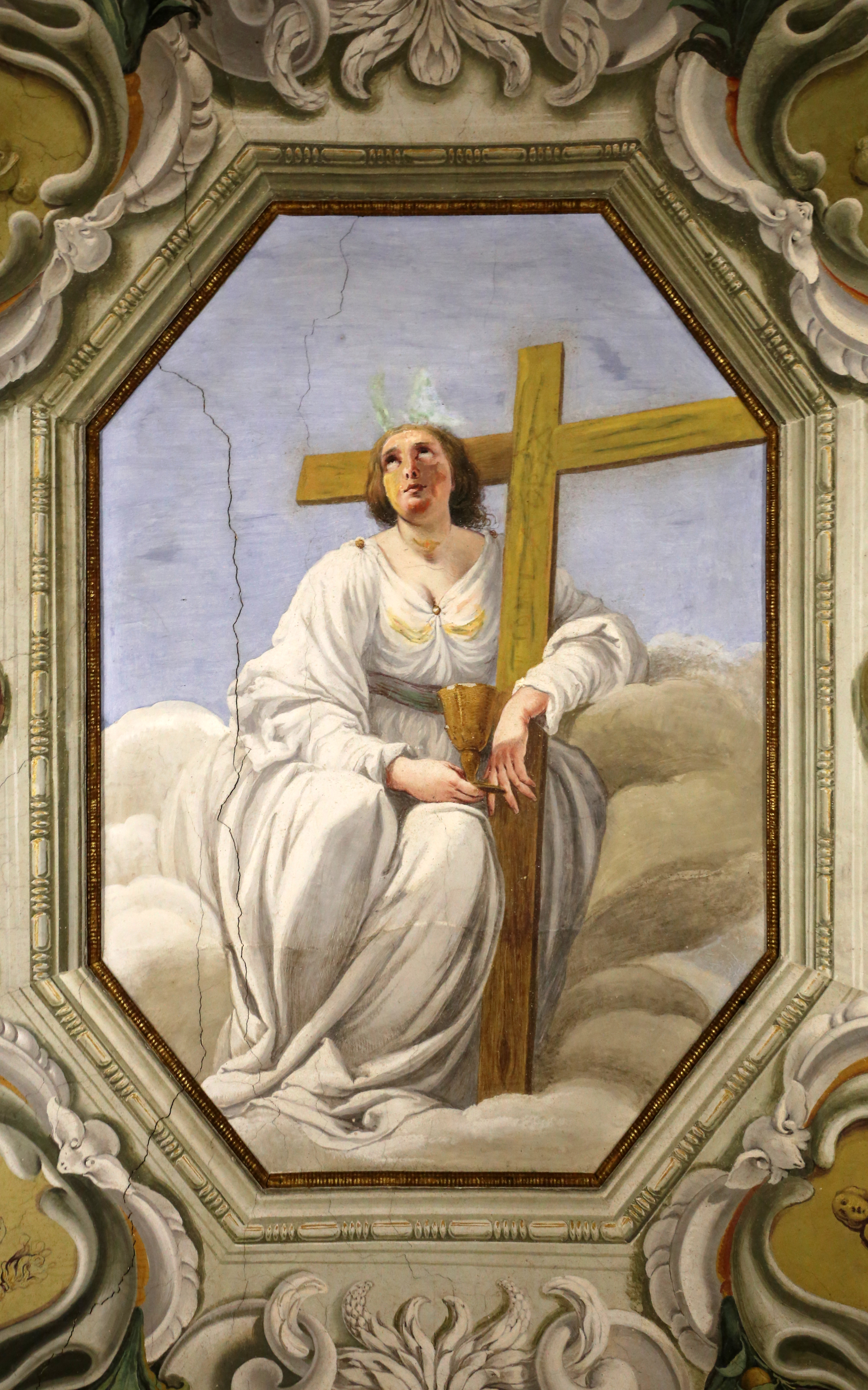
- Faith (c. 1640), Palazzo di San Clemente, Florence
- Born: October 31, 1604; Florence, Grand Duchy of Tuscany
- Died: July 1657 (aged 52); Madrid, Spain
- Education: Giovanni Bilivert
- Known for: Painting; Engineering; Architecture; Scenic design
- Movement: Baroque

Luigi Baccio del Bianco or Baccio del Bianco (31 October 1604 – July 1657) was an Italian architect, engineer, scenic designer and painter. In Spain he was known as Bartolomeo del Blanco, since Baccio is an Italian diminutive for Bartolommeo or Bartolomeo, while Bianco and Blanco are Italian-Spanish equivalents of "white". Accordingly, he shows up as such in certain sources.

== Life ==
He was born in Florence where his father, Cosimo del Bianco, sold cloth to the nobility for use in festivals, tournaments, and theatrical performances. He studied painting under Giovanni Bilivert from 1612 to 1620. Baccio's work and letters also show the influence exerted on the painter by Vincenzio Bocaccio of Rome, who came to Florence, delegated as one of the best students of the architect and painter Lodovico Cigoli. He also apprenticed under Giulio Parigi.

=== Bratislava - Vienna - Prague - Milan ===
In 1620 he visited Germania and travelled to the Hungary, where he assisted Giovanni de Galliano Pieroni (1586–1654) in construction of a fortress in Pressburg (now Bratislava). On his return he decorated several houses, and painted for churches and theatres. In 1622 he went to Vienna, and the same year both went on to Prague in Bohemia, where he performed extensive work in frescoes of the Wallenstein Palace: Audience hall, St Wenceslas chapel, Ovidius' corridor, Astronomical corridor and Sala terrena, some with help of assistants. He did not stay there permanently, as there is evidence he lived in Milan shortly thereafter and was back in Florence in 1625.

=== Milan - Florence ===
In 1636 he projected the St Ignatius church for Győr. Then he stayed in Florence and painted illusive frescoes (open doors and portraits) for The House Buonarroti (Casa Buonarroti). Then he decorated with frescoes the Palazzo di San Clemente in Florence and Torregalli castle in Tuscany. In danger of war in 1642 he turned back to projects of fortresses (Livorno, Prato, Pistoia etc.).

=== Madrid - Buen Retiro ===
In 1651 he was sent to Spain by Grand Duke Ferdinando II de' Medici to fulfill King Philip IV's request for designer for court performances. His work at the Spanish court included scenes and theatrical machinery for La fiera, el rayo y la piedra in 1652 and Andrómeda y Perseo in 1653 (both plays by Pedro Calderón de la Barca).

He died at Madrid in 1657.

== Gallery ==
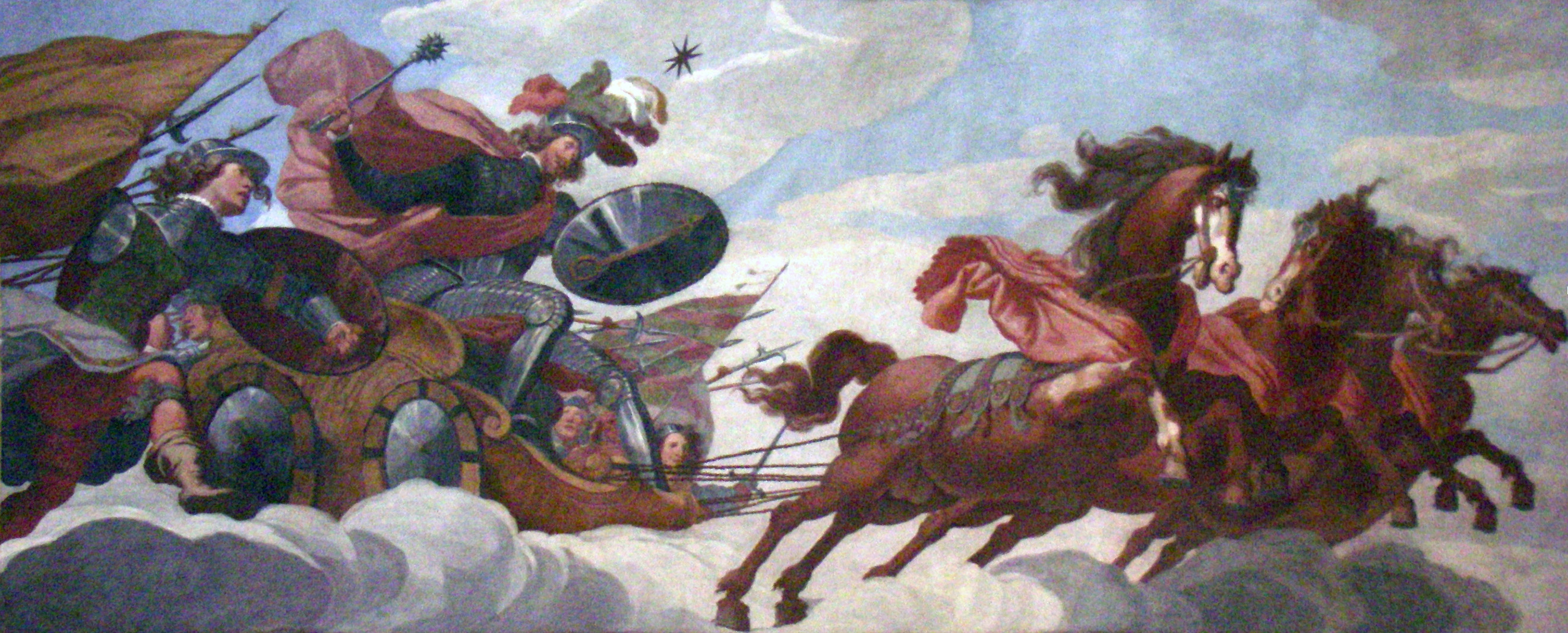
Prague, Wallenstein Palace, Audience hall, Albrecht Wallenstein as Mars (cropped)

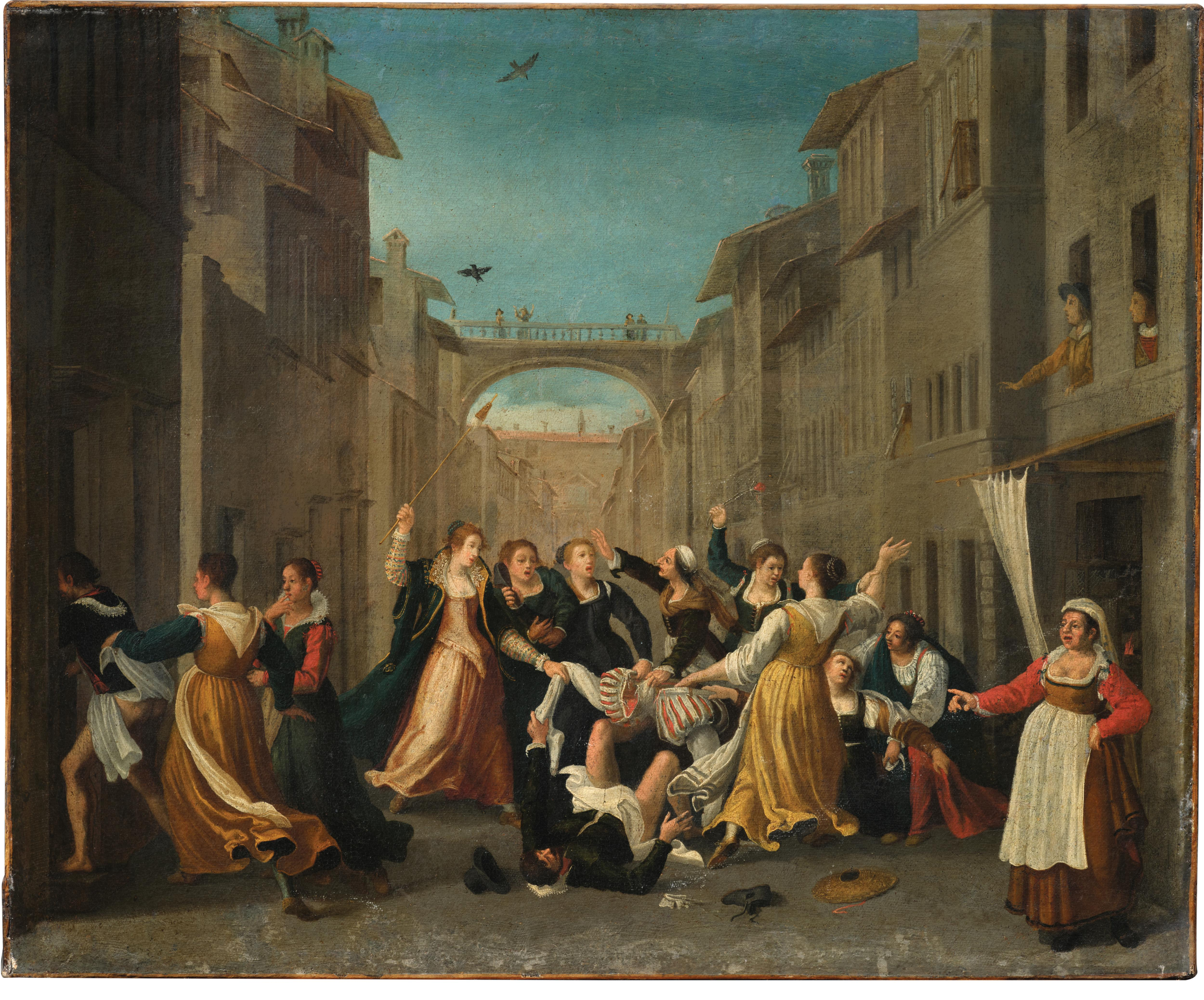
Der Kampf um die Hose, Dorotheum, Vienna

== See also ==
- Bartolomeo Bianco of Como, (contemporary to him Geneoese baroque architect, conflated with Luigi Baccio del Bianco)

== Bibliography ==
- "Science in Contact with Art: Astronomical Symbolics of the Wallenstein Palace in Prague", Alena Hadravová (Research Centre for the History of Science and Humanities of the Czech Academy of Sciences and Charles University), Petr Hadrava (Astronomical Institute of the Czech Academy of Sciences), published in: Science in contact at the beginning of scientific revolution, Ed. J. Zamrzlová, Acta historiae rerum naturalium necnon technicarum, New series, Vol. 8 (2004), pp. 173 – 210. ISBN 80-7037-133-1
