= Wallenstein Palace =

Baroque palace in Malá Strana, Prague, Czech Republic

Coordinates: 50°05′24″N 14°24′24″E

Waldstein Palace
- Valdštejnský palác
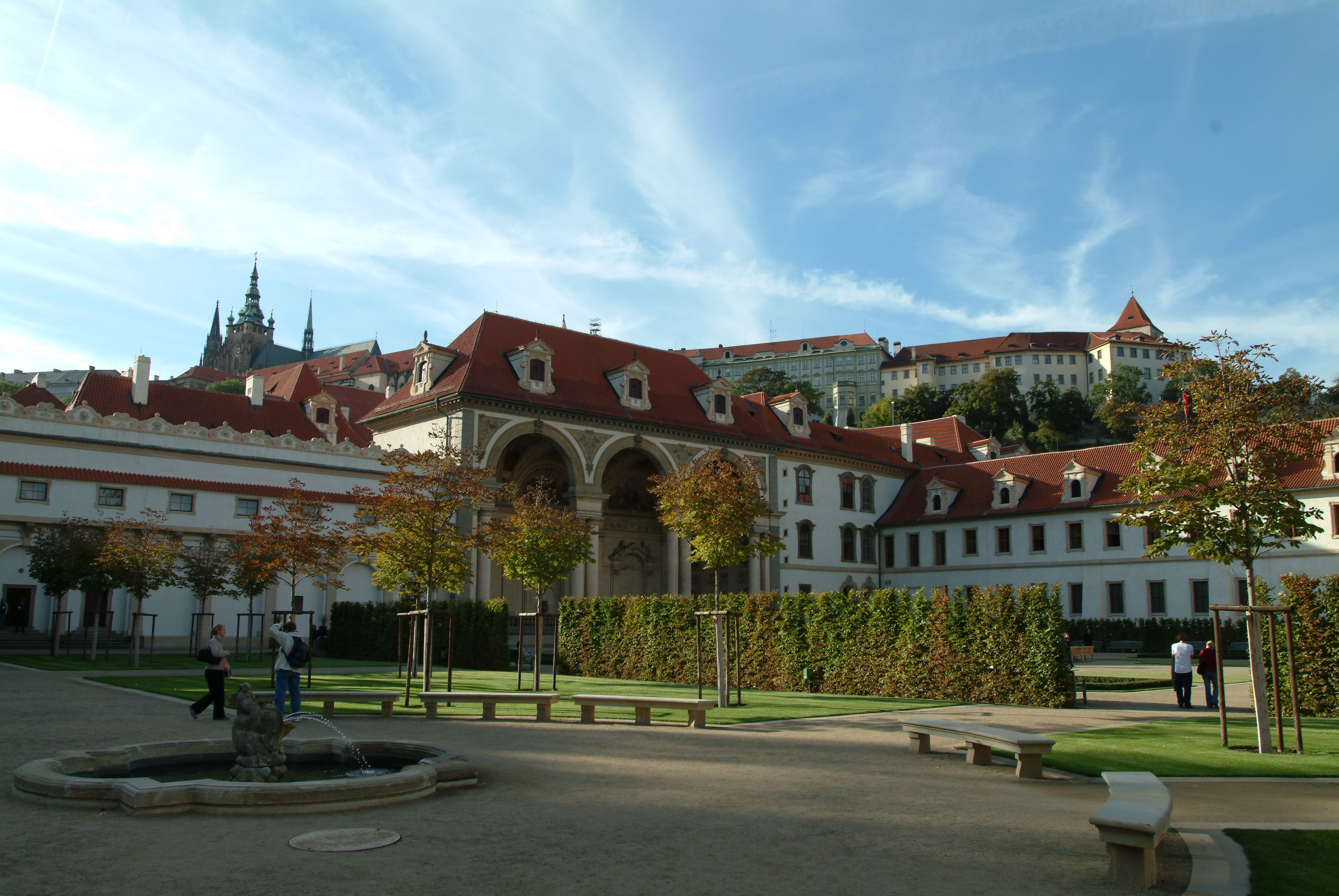
- The east facade of the palace and portion of the Waldstein Garden with Prague Castle in the background

General information
- Architectural style: Baroque
- Location: Prague, Czech Republic
- Construction started: 1623
- Client: Albrecht von Waldstein

National Cultural Monument of the Czech Republic
- Designated: October 15, 1992
- Reference no.: 38965/1-516

Waldstein Palace (Czech: Valdštejnský palác) is a Baroque palace in Malá Strana, Prague, that served as a residence for Imperial Generalissimo Albrecht von Waldstein and now houses the Senate of the Czech Republic.

== History ==
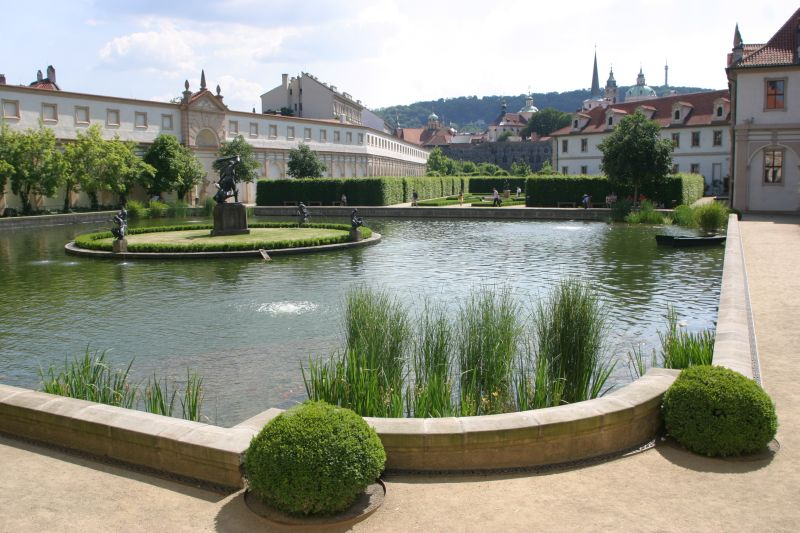
Gardens of the palace

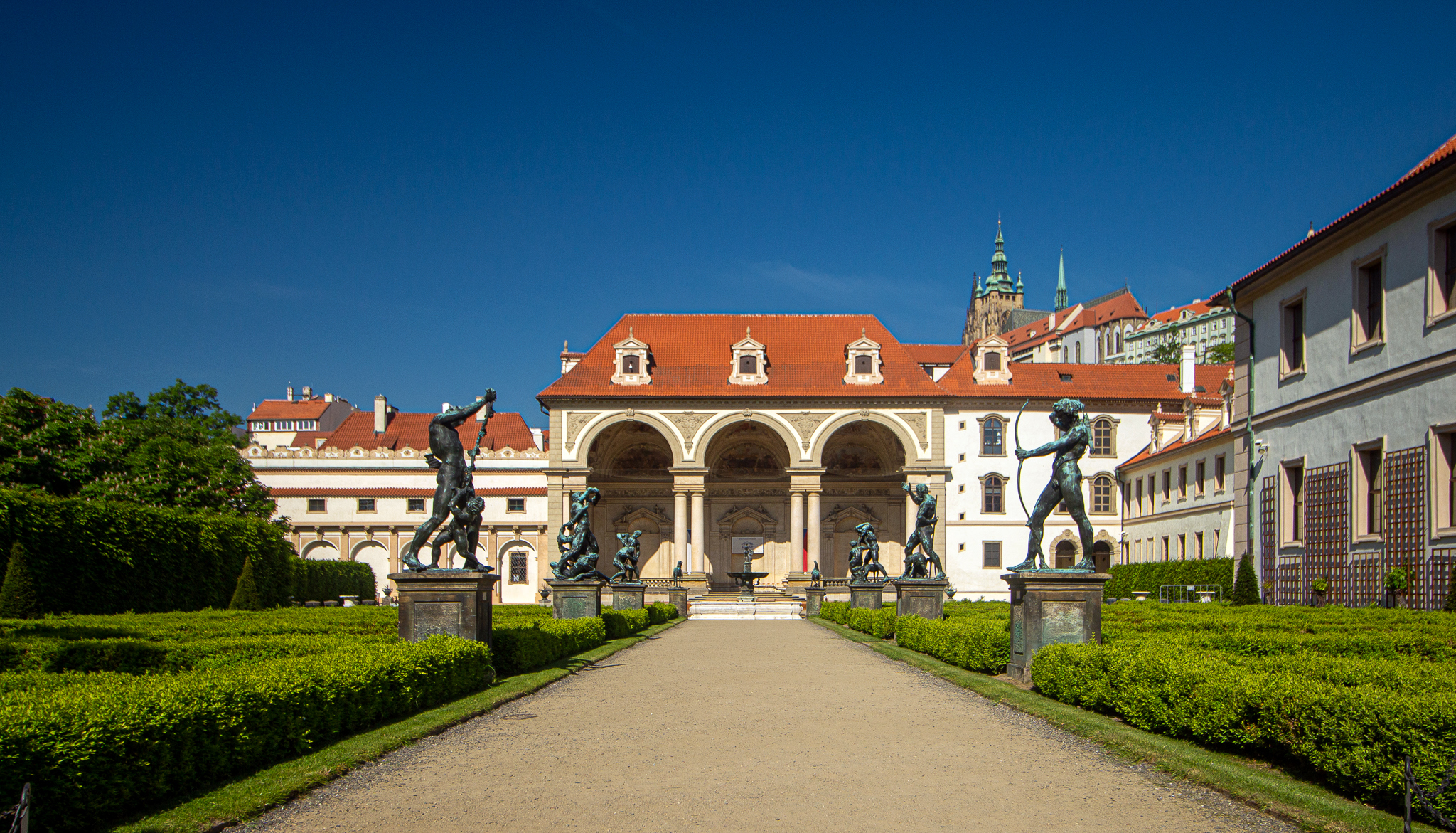
Garden frontage with sala terrena

The original Palace was built in years 1623-1630 by Albrecht von Wallenstein, Duke of Mecklenburg (1583-1634), who made his name and fortune as the Commander-in-Chief of the Imperial forces in the Thirty Years War. Emperor Ferdinand II feared Albrecht von Wallenstein's calculating mind, thus he had him assassinated in 1634 in the town of Eger (now Cheb). He lived in the palace for only a year before his death. His widow sold it to his nephew and it remained in the Wallenstein family until 1945. After the Second World War, the palace became Czechoslovak state property and was renovated to house government offices. Today, the Senate of the Czech Republic operates out of the main palace buildings. The Riding School is used as a branch of the National Gallery in Prague. The challenging restoration of the main building began in mid-1999. The most valuable parts of this building in historical and artistic terms are the Main Hall, the Knights' Hall, the Antechamber, the Audience Hall and the Mythological and Astronomical Corridors.

Albrecht of Wallenstein had traveled in Italy, and when the palace was built between 1623 and 1630, Italian architects and artisans were used including Andrea Spezza (likely the main architect), succeeded in 1628 by Niccolo Sebregondi. The interiors were decorated by the Florentine Baccio del Bianco (1604-1656), who completed the ceiling fresco in the Main Hall, figure paintings in St Wenceslas Chapel, and most important parts of the decoration of the Mythological Corridor during the first year of construction. The Florentine Giovanni de Galliano Pieroni (1586-1654), engineer and army colonel, played an important role in the construction. Pieroni's father Alessandro (1550-1607) had been an architect for the Medici. Pieroni studied the design of the new part to Wallenstein's Castle in Jičín and the church of St. Jacob there, and the garden, Sala Terrena, and Riding School are attributed to him. Pieroni also influences the astrological and astronomical decoration of the Mythological Corridor and other interiors. The total value of interior furnishings after his death was 70 000 gold pieces, while another 134 000 gold pieces was invested in jewels and tableware made from precious metals.

To make space for this palace, Wallenstein razed 26 houses, six gardens, and two brickworks at the site. Wallenstein Palace was built to rival Prague Castle. Four courtyards are created by the palace layout. Its complex includes period gardens, the Avenue of Sculptures, stables and the large Riding School. The monumental conception of the loggia with three arcades on doubled columns recalls the Baroque style. The Italian style garden includes an aviary, a grotto, and a fountain by Adrian de Vries (c.1545-1626). After years of neglect after the war, the gardens have been reconstructed. Wallenstein would have dined in the huge sala terrena (garden pavilion) that looks out over fountain and rows of bronze statues. The sala terrena and its rich stucco decoration were modeled after the portico of a Livornese church. Today, these are copies of the Netherlander sculptor Adriaen de Vries’ works. The originals were looted by the Swedish army in 1648, and they can be seen today at Drottningholm Palace. Immortal Beloved (film), a 1994 film about the life of Beethoven was filmed in the gardens.

== Description ==
=== Main wing ===
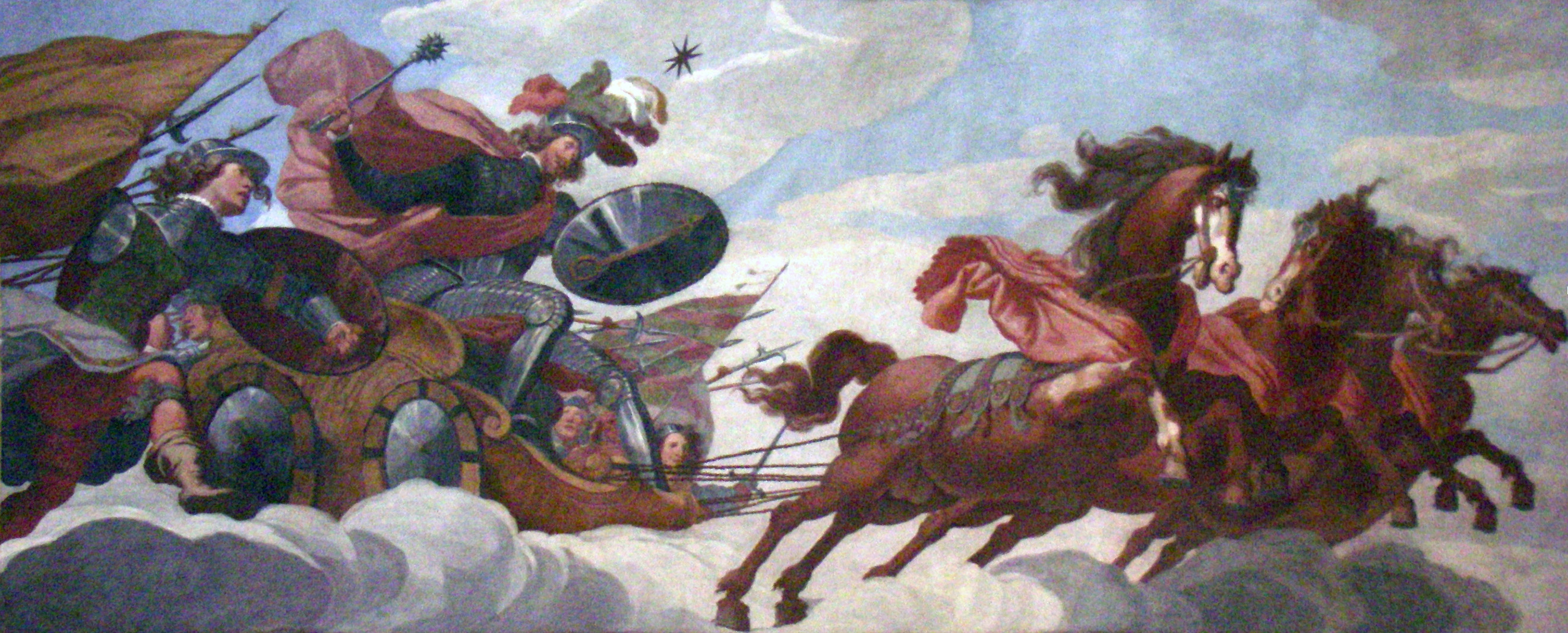
Albrecht Wallenstein as Mars (cropped)

The main wing of Wallenstein palace was largely a reconstruction of the Trcka residence that runs 60 meters along Valdstejnske namesti. The façade has three rows of identical windows which stream light into the Main Hall. It incorporates both late renaissance and Nordic mannerism which is expressed in the portals and Netherlandish dormer-windows. Initially, in keeping with the architectural style, the Main Hall was decorated with tapestries and furniture ordered from Italy and the Netherlands. Much of the original furnishings were looted either in 1648 by the Swedes or 1742 by the French. The west wing of the complex hosts the Main Hall, that rises to the height of two stories. The Duke is depicted by Baccio del Bianco, in the middle ceiling fresco as the god of war, Mars, riding in a war chariot drawn by a team of horses. In the painting, the Duke is holding the reins of four horses while Mars is usually seen only holding three horses. This is another example of Albrecht von Wallenstein's vanity. The stucco work depicting weapons, war trophies and musical instruments were probably made by Santino Galli and Domenico Canevalle. These are references to The Duke's career in the military. When it was built, it was the second largest hall after the Spanish hall of Prague Castle with an area of 288 meters squared and a height of 10.5 meters. This is original façade was altered in the mid nineteenth century to include marble portals from the Cerninsky palace and the entire hall was rebuilt as a barracks.

A key feature of the palace is the system of corridors that connects all parts of the palace. In many palaces of the period it was necessary to go from room to room to move around, but it was possible for the Duke of Wallenstein to walk from the main Audience hall to his private study and then around the gardens to the stables at the north end of the palace complex via the corridors. The Ovidius corridor is named after frescoes of Metamorphoses, the Astronomical corridor is depicted by allegories of four continents and zodiac emblems, all made by Baccio del Bianco.

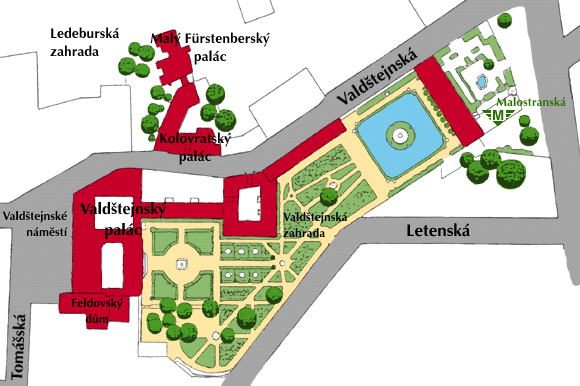
A map of Wallenstein Palace

Originally tile stoves placed in each room heated the palace. The tile in the Antechamber was used later to line the fireplace. Guests waited in the antechamber to be granted audience with the Duke. Due to an adaptation in the 19th century, it is a kind of Mirror Hall with two Venetian mirrors made in the 18th century on the Italian island of Murano. The only objects original to the room are a set of four chests used by the Duke to hold his wardrobe. They are Italian chests made around the turn of the 17th century.

=== Audience Chamber ===
The Audience Chamber is a small circular room adjoining the Antechamber and the Mythological Corridor. A door leading from the Audience Chamber to a staircase was preserved from the Trèkovský dùm, one of the original properties on the site. Several other salvaged architectural pieces were incorporated into the palace. Stuccowork and paintings depict Ovid's Four ages and portraits of the Four Periods of the Day. The Baroque stuccowork of the dome in the Audience Chamber is mirrored in the Mythological corridor. The mythological corridor also has murals depicting planet motifs and legends such as Mercury & Argus, Diana and Acteon, Perseus killing Medusa, Callisto metamorphosed into a bear, and the Rape of Europa. Ovid's Metamorphoses inspired Baccio del Bianco's frescoes in this corridor.

=== Chapel ===
The palace chapel is two stories high and richly decorated with scenes from the legend of St Wenceslas. Cabinet-maker and woodcarver Arnošt Jan Heidelberger constructed the chapel altar in 1630. Its construction marked the first Baroque monument of its kind in Prague and the beginning of the Baroque age in the Czech lands. Three oratories open on the western wall of the chapel. The Duke used the first floor for services while his wife sat on the second floor and servants were restricted to the third floor. Baccio del Bianco is responsible for the paintings in this chapel. St Eusebius's like a death is depicted in the first oratory. Following that, the Duchess's oratory was decorated with usual Marian iconography. Frescos of the Chapel were inspired by St Vitus cathedral in Prague Castle. Ernest Heidelberger is assumed to have created the sculpture work for the Chapel.
