= Willem Danielsz van Tetrode =

Dutch sculptor

Willem Danielsz. van Tetrode
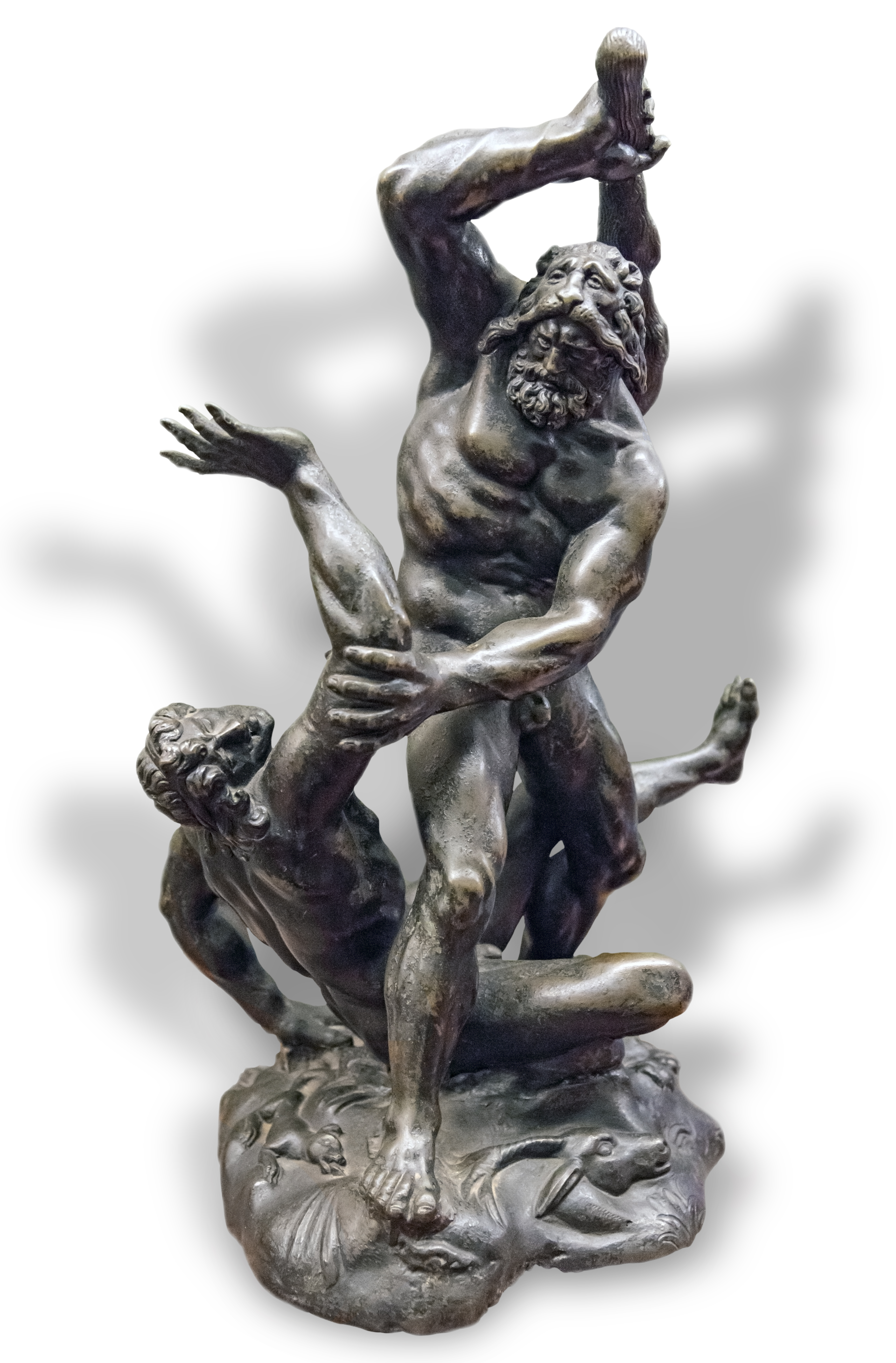
- Born: Before 1530; Delft, Habsburg Netherlands
- Died: After 1587
- Known for: Sculpting

Willem Danielsz. van Tetrode, known in Italy as Guglielmo Fiammingo (before c. 1530, Delft — after 1587), was a sixteenth-century sculptor of Dutch origin who served as a pupil of Benvenuto Cellini in Florence. On his return to Delft in the Netherlands in 1567–68, it has been suggested that he may have trained the young Adriaen de Vries and encouraged him to go to Florence.

== Life and work ==
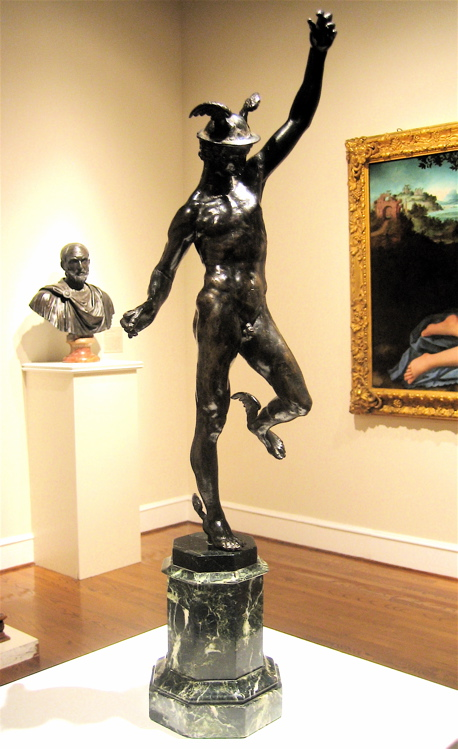
Mercury (1549–1550) in the Los Angeles County Museum of Art

Willem, as he still was, is documented at the court of François I by his late teens, which provides the most reasonable place for him to have met Benvenuto Cellini, who left the French court and returned to Florence in 1545. He is documented in the Florentine workshop of Cellini in 1549–50; he was among the sculptors who worked on the marble base for Cellini's Perseus with the Head of Medusa in Florence. In Rome a surviving letter of Guglielmo's records Cellini's distaste and contempt for restoring antique Roman sculpture. In about 1549 Guglielmo restored an antique fragmentary torso as a Ganymede for Cosimo I de' Medici.

In Rome he worked under the direction of Guglielmo della Porta, restoring antiquities for the Cortile del Belvedere and other Vatican projects. On his return to Florence in 1562, Guglielmo reminded Cosimo of his former work on the Ganymede, The work in question, executed under Cellini's direction and commonly attributed to him, shows uncommonly refined cutting; Anthony Radcliffe remarked "it must be asked to what extent the beautiful statue now in the Bargello is the product of the technical skill of Willem van Tetrode".

Giorgio Vasari records a writing cabinet adorned with bronze replicas of the antique Dioscuri, the Apollo Belvedere, the Farnese Hercules and the Venus de' Medici and at least sixteen other statuettes by Fiammingo; it was commissioned by Nicolò Orsini, conte di Pitigliano and completed in 1559, intended as a diplomatic gift for Philip II of Spain. The desk was eventually dismantled, and the bronzes are conserved in the Bargello (the bronzes identified by Anna Maria Massinelli in 1987 and exhibited at the Bargello in Florence in 1989, with the catalogue edited by Massinelli), six were included in a 2003 exhibition curated by Frits Scholten, "Willem van Tetrode (c. 1525-1580): Bronze Sculptures of the Renaissance", which was mounted by the Rijksmuseum; it travelled to the Frick Collection, New York, and brought the sculptor into some focus.

Three of the bronze fauns on Bartolommeo Ammanati's Fountain of Neptune that were long attributed to Guglielmo Fiammingo cannot be his, since their facture is documented as being begun in March 1571 and finished in June 1575, by which time, Anthony Radcliffe has pointed out, van Tetrode was back in Delft by 1566–67; there in 1568 he signed a contract for the new high altar in the Oude Kerk, which he finished in 1573. In 1574-75 he was in Cologne. It now appears that Tetrode was a seminal figure in introducing to the Netherlands the small-scale bronze sculpture, suited to a collector's study.

An engraving was published by Hendrick Goltzius of a design for a silver salver by Tetrode. Anthony Radcliffe explored possible connections between the two artists.

Until recently, little has been written in English of the enigmatic figure of Willem Tetrode/Guglielmo Fiammingo.
