= March 2010 Party of Civic Rights leadership election =

March 2010 SPO leadership election
- 6 March 2010
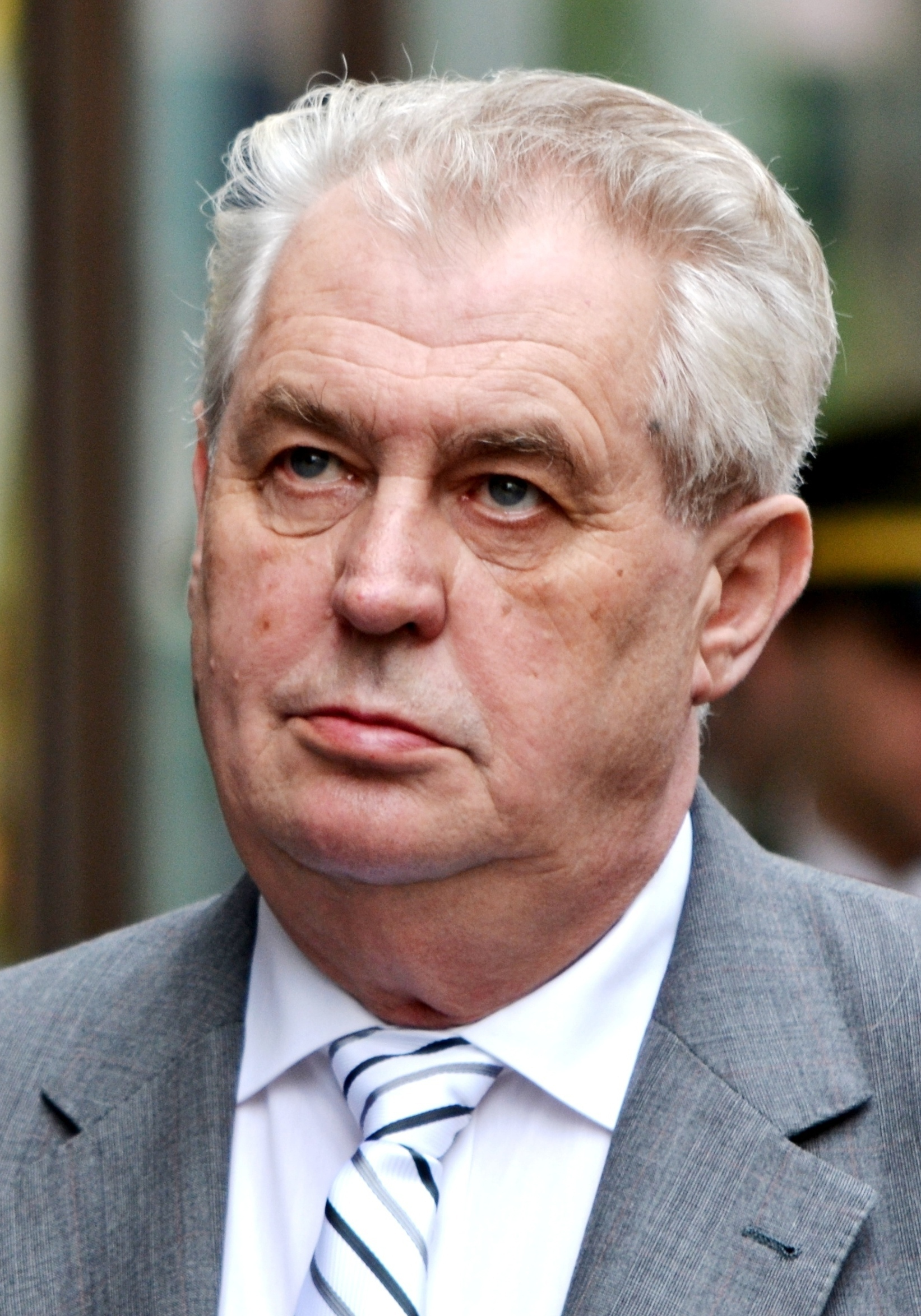
Candidate	Miloš Zeman
Electoral vote	245
Percentage	91.1%
Elected Leader of SPO
Miloš Zeman

The Party of Civic Rights (SPO) leadership election of March 2010 was held on 6 March 2010. Miloš Zeman became party's first leader.

== Background ==
Party of Civic Rights was founded in October 2009 by association of Miloš Zeman's friends. Miloš Zeman was expected to become party's leader. Zeman himself didn't confirm these speculations. Party's founders confirmed that Zeman is expected to become the new leader.

== Result ==
Candidate	Votes	%
Miloš Zeman	245	91.08%
Against	23	8.92%
Invalid	1	0.37%

Voting was held on 6 March 2010. Zeman was the only candidate. He received 245 votes of 269 and was elected.
