= Libuše Benešová =

Czech politician

President of the Senate
- In office 16 December 1998 – 23 November 2000
- Preceded by: Petr Pithart
- Succeeded by: Ivan Havlíček (acting)

Senator from Benešov
- In office 23 November 1996 – 23 November 2000
- Preceded by: Seat established
- Succeeded by: Helena Rögnerová

Personal details
- Born: 5 July 1948 (age 78) Benešov, Czechoslovakia
- Party: Civic Democratic Party
- Education: Charles University
- Occupation: politician

Libuše Benešová (born 5 July 1948) is a Czech politician who served as the President of the Senate from 1998 to 2000. Benešová was elected Senator from Benešov in the 1996 election, serving until 2000. After running for re-election as Senator for Benešov in 2000, she finished second behind Four-Coalition candidate Helena Rögnerová, who resultantly succeeded her.
