= Giovanni de Galliano Pieroni =

Italian mathematician and astrologer

Giovanni de Galliano Pieroni (1586–1654) was a military engineer specialized in erecting fortifications, architect, mathematician and astronomer who gained particular fame in his day as also as author of horoscopes. Early in his life, he became friendly with the astronomer, mathematician and physicist Galileo Galilei (1564-1642) – like Pieroni, Galileo also wrote on constructing fortifications, and the two shared interest in mathematics and astronomy. He was also a contemporary and friend of Johannes Kepler (1571-1630) while both spent time in Prague.

== Biography ==
=== Early life and education ===
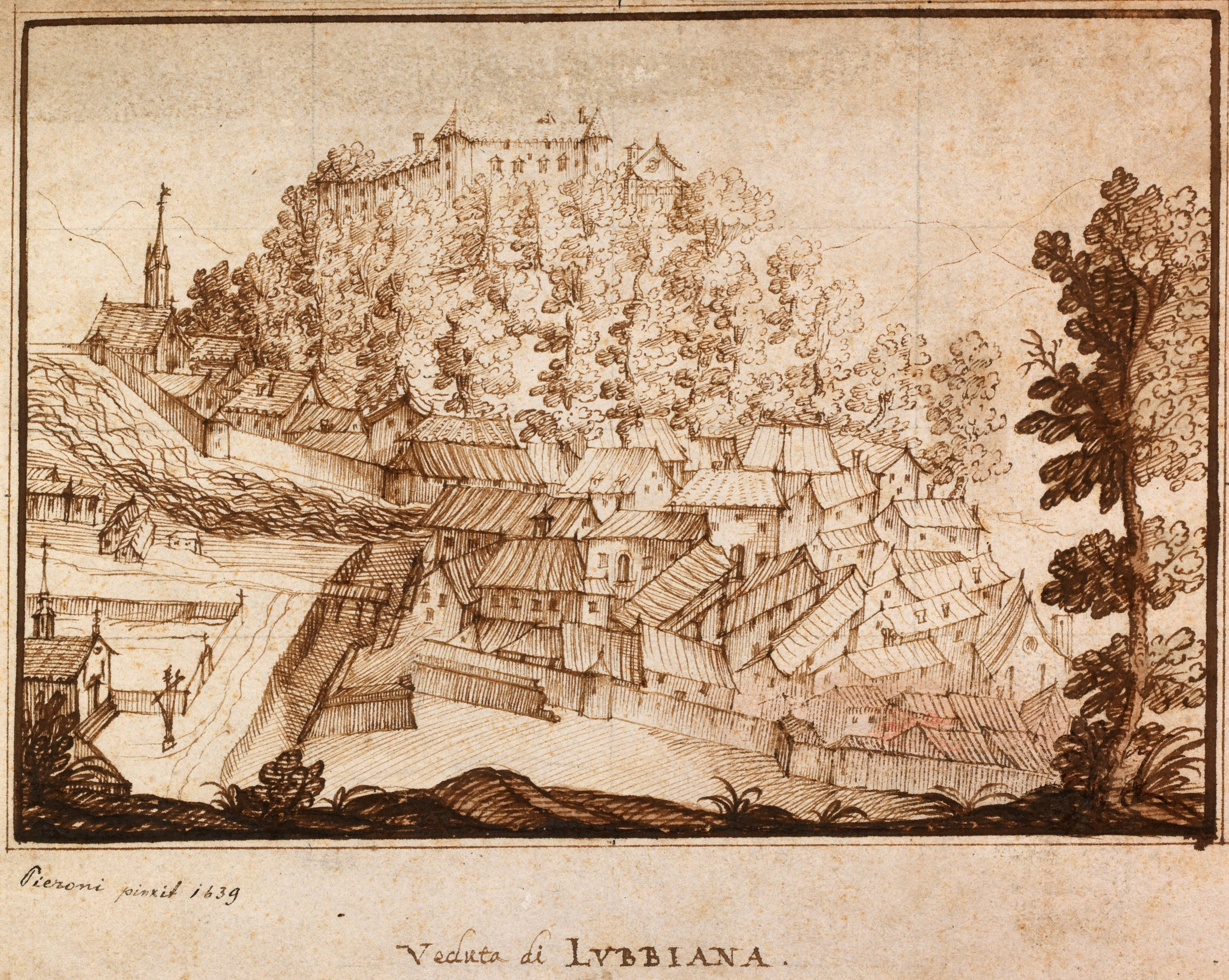
View of Ljubljana, drawn by Giovanni Pieroni. Pieroni travelled around the Habsburg monarchy as a military engineer, and left a series of drawing and sketches of Central European towns and fortresses.

Pieroni was born in Florence on 5 March 1586. His childhood and education was privileged because his father Alessandro Pieroni (1550-1607) was an architect at the court of the Medici. After studying law, he was awarded a doctorate in law in Pisa in 1608. He studied under Bernardo Buontalenti (1531-1608). During that time he befriended Galileo, who served then the Tuscan Grand Duke, Cosimo II di Medici. The two corresponded for many years, even after Pieroni left Florence.

=== Career ===
Pieroni spent a lot of time working for general Albrecht of Wallenstein (1583–1634), in Vienna and Prague, fixing up fortifications of castles and in that vein, of palace and park grounds, particularly the Wallenstein Palace, collaborating with great Baroque Italian artists and architects. His young assistant in both cities was Baccio del Bianco, who memorably described Pieroni as an "astrological architect".

From 1623 he worked on the rebuilding of the Bohemian town of Jičín, which Waldstein was turning into a second capital. In 1628 he designed the Jičín Jesuit college and submitted designs for the completion of the Waldstein palace there.

In 1635, Pieroni was granted Wallenstein' former estate Dubenec, first as administrator and since 1650 as possessor. Some time before 1637, Ferdinand II, Holy Roman Emperor, raised Pieroni to the nobility for his achievements. Since 1639, Pieroni documented the state of fortifications in Croatia and along the Military Frontier on behest of the Hofkriegsrat, the Imperial war council. Based on his studies, he wrote the treatise Trattato delle fortificazioni moderne.

After the end of the Thirty Years' War, Pieroni was in charge of the repair and expansion of Prague's fortifications under the city commanders Innocentio Conti and Jan van der Croon. He was assisted by the builders and architects Carlo Lurago and Santino Bossi. Van der Croon and Pieroni also took responsibility for constructing the defensive walls of Náchod castle for its owner Ottavio Piccolomini.

== Bibliography ==
- Science in Contact with Art: Astronomical Symbolics of the Wallenstein Palace in Prague, Alena Hadravová (Research Centre for the History of Science and Humanities of the Czech Academy of Sciences and Charles University), Petr Hadrava (Astronomical Institute of the Czech Academy of Sciences), published in: Science in contact at the beginning of scientific revolution, Ed. J. Zamrzlová, Acta historiae rerum naturalium necnon technicarum, New series, Vol. 8 (2004), pp. 173 – 210. ISBN 80-7037-133-1 html version with "Giovanni Pieroni" color-highlighted
