= Jan Veleba (politician) =

Czech politician (born 1947)

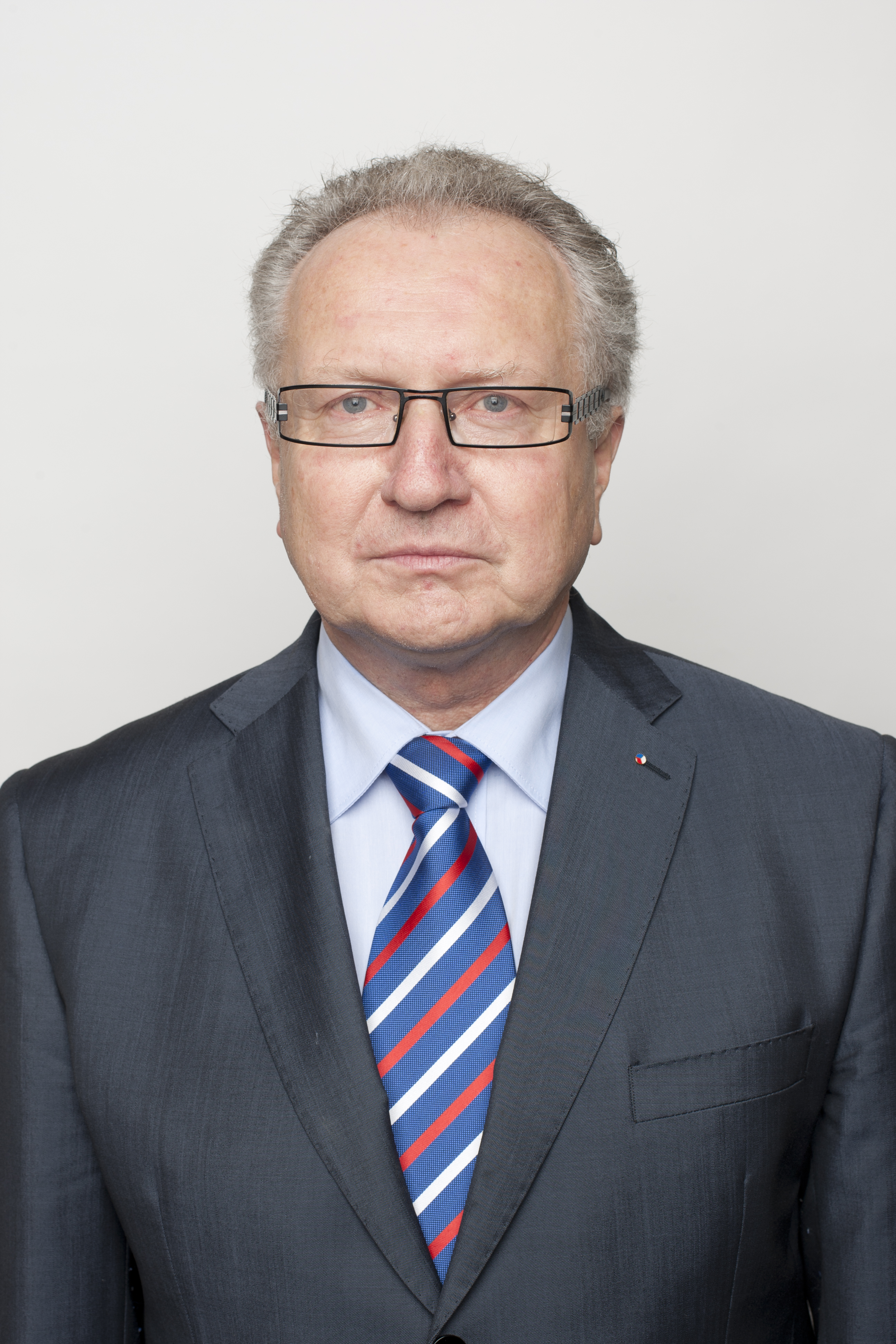

Leader of the Party of Civic Rights
- In office 29 March 2014 – 28 March 2018
- Preceded by: Zdeněk Štengl
- Succeeded by: Lubomír Nečas

Senator from Chrudim
- In office 20 October 2012 – 20 October 2018
- Preceded by: Petr Pithart
- Succeeded by: Jan Tecl

Personal details
- Born: 25 August 1947 (age 79) Nové Město na Moravě, Czechoslovakia (now Czech Republic)
- Party: Communist Party; Party for Life Security; Party of Civic Rights (since 2014)
- Education: Mendel University in Brno; Masaryk University (UJEP)

Jan Veleba (born 25 August 1947 in Nové Město na Moravě) is a Czech politician and agricultural functionary. He was a Senator of the Parliament of the Czech Republic since 2012 Czech Senate election. In March 2014 he was elected a new Chairman of the Party of Civic Rights after Zdeněk Štengl.
