= President of the Senate of the Czech Republic =

Political position

- Předseda Senátu České republiky

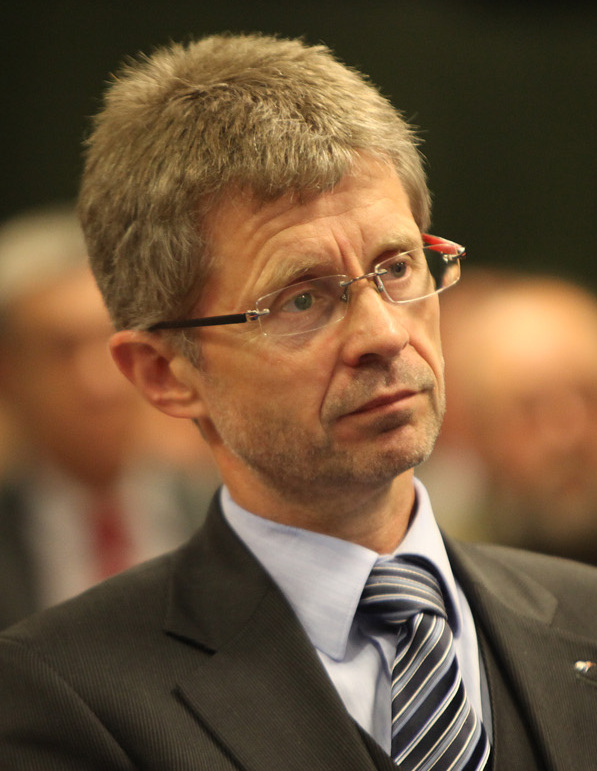
- Incumbent; Miloš Vystrčil since 19 February 2020
- Senate of the Czech Republic
- Style: Mr. President (Informal and within the Senate); The Honorable (Formal)
- Appointer: Senate of the Czech Republic
- Term length: At the pleasure of the Senate, and until another is elected or their term of office as a Senator expires
- Constituting instrument: Constitution of the Czech Republic
- Formation: 1 January 1993 (de iure)
- First holder: Petr Pithart

The president of the Senate of the Parliament of the Czech Republic (Czech: Předseda Senátu Parlamentu České republiky) is the presiding officer of the Senate, the upper house of the Parliament of the Czech Republic and also the second-highest-ranking official of the Czech Republic, after the president.

The position is provided for by Article 29 of the Constitution of the Czech Republic. The Senate elects one of its members as president at the start of each new term, or whenever the position is vacant.

As a custom, the strongest party in the Senate usually chooses the president.

== See also ==
- Senate of the Czech Republic
- List of presidents of the Senate of the Czech Republic
