= Petr Pithart =

Czech politician, lawyer and political scientist

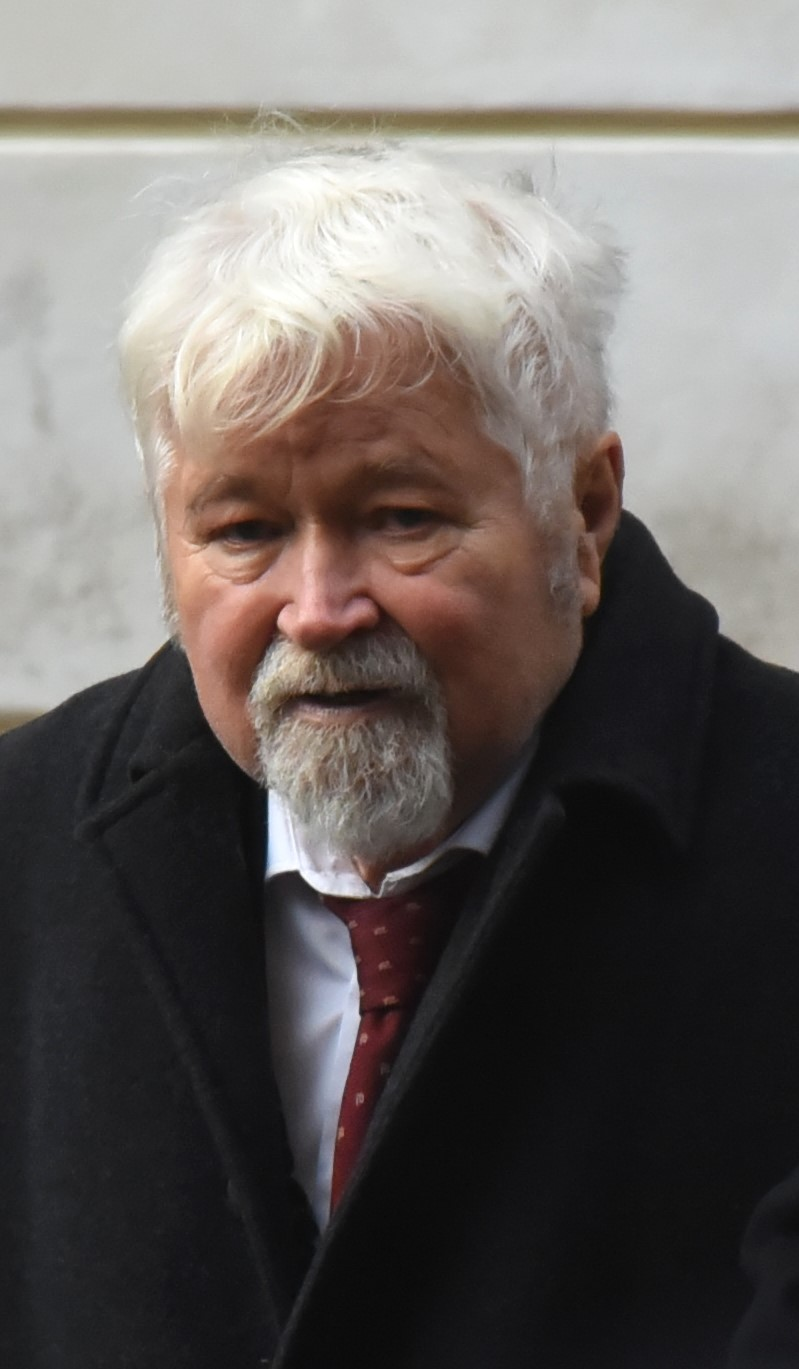
- Pithart in 2023

Prime Minister of the Czech Republic (Federal region)
- In office 6 February 1990 – 2 July 1992
- President: Václav Havel
- Preceded by: František Pitra
- Succeeded by: Václav Klaus

President of the Czech Senate
- In office 8 January 1996 – 16 November 1998
- Preceded by: Office established
- Succeeded by: Libuše Benešová
- In office 19 December 2000 – 15 December 2004
- Preceded by: Ivan Havlíček (acting)
- Succeeded by: Přemysl Sobotka

Senator from Chrudim
- In office 23 November 1996 – 28 October 2012
- Preceded by: Office established
- Succeeded by: Jan Veleba

Personal details
- Born: 2 January 1941 (age 85) Kladno, Protectorate of Bohemia and Moravia
- Party: KSČ (1959-68); OF (1989-91); OH (1991-92); KDU–ČSL (since 1998)
- Spouse: Drahomíra Hromádková
- Children: David; Klára
- Education: Charles University
- Occupation: Lawyer
- Website: pithart.cz

Petr Pithart (born 2 January 1941) is a Czech politician, lawyer and political scientist who served as Prime Minister of the Czech Republic (then a federal region of Czechoslovakia) from 6 February 1990 to 2 July 1992. He was also the Senator for Chrudim from 1996 to 2012 and served as President of the Senate from 8 January 1996 to 16 December 1998 and again from 19 December 2000 to 15 December 2004.

On 1 January 2018 Pithart received the Order of the White Double Cross state award (second class) from Slovak President Andrej Kiska.

== Political career ==
Pithart was a member of the Communist Party of Czechoslovakia from 1960, was active in the Prague Spring, and left the party after the Soviet invasion. He was later one of the most prominent dissidents against the communist regime, and was imprisoned for his activities, including being one of the first signatories of Charter 77. In 1989 he was one of the prominent leaders of the Civic Forum, founded at the start of the Velvet Revolution. Having participated in the negotiations leading to changes to the federal, Czech and Slovak governments, he was appointed Prime Minister of the Czech Socialist Republic.

Pithart is often characterised as a philosopher and thinker, rather than a tactical or charismatic leader. His 1990-92 Czech government was unable to deal with the growing power of federal Finance Minister Václav Klaus and his increasingly popular Civic Democratic Party, nor growing Slovak nationalism, which culminated in the dissolution of Czechoslovakia and defeat for Pithart's Civic Movement party.

Pithart was unsuccessful in his bid to become President of the Czech Republic at the 2003 election, losing to Václav Klaus.

In 1998 Pithart joined the Christian and Democratic Union - Czechoslovak People's Party. He was elected as senator in 1996, and re-elected in 2000 and 2006. He was the First Deputy Chairman of the Senate of the Parliament of the Czech Republic from 2004 to 2012. He retired in 2012.
