= Ivan Havlíček =

Czech physicist and politician (1945–2023)

Ivan Havlíček (2 February 1945 – 25 November 2023) was a Czech physicist, academic and politician. He served as a senator in 1996–2002. In 1996–2000, he was the deputy chairman of the Senate of the Czech Republic. He died on 25 November 2023, at the age of 78.
