= Senate of the Czech Republic =

Upper house of Czech Parliament

Coordinates: 50°05′24″N 14°24′19″E

Senate of the Parliament of the Czech Republic Senát Parlamentu České republiky

Type
- Type: Upper house of the Parliament of the Czech Republic

History
- Founded: 18 December 1996

Leadership
- President: Miloš Vystrčil, ODS since 19 February 2020
- Vice-President: Jiří Drahoš, STAN since 2 November 2022
- Ladislav Václavec, ANO since 30 October 2024
- Jiří Oberfalzer, ODS since 14 November 2018

Structure
- Seats: 81
- Political groups: Government (14): ANO (14) (Note: ANO (11); Independent (1); NEZ (1); Přísaha (1)); Opposition (67): ODS and TOP 09 (30) (Note: ODS (18); TOP 09 (7); Our Czechia (2); Tábor 2020 (1); ProMOST (1); Independent (1)); Mayors and Independents (18) (Note: STAN (14) (Note: Hana Žáková, Miroslav Balatka, Miroslav Plevný, Jan Sobotka, and Helena Pešatová are non-partisans, nominated by STAN.) (Note: David Smoljak is a member of STAN, nominated by a coalition of STAN, Pirates and TOP 09.); SLK (3) (Note: Zdeněk Linhart is non-partisan, nominated by STAN and SLK.); 24/7 (1)); KDU-ČSL (13) (Note: KDU-ČSL (12) (Note: Miluše Horská, Josef Klement, and Lumír Kantor are non-partisans, nominated by KDU-ČSL.); NMFM (1)); SEN 21 and Independents (5) (Note: SEN 21 (3); OK (1); Independent (1)); Non-attached (1) (Note: Independent (1))
- Committees: 10 Committees

Elections
- Voting system: Two-round system (Staggered elections)
- First election: 15–16 and 22–23 November 1996
- Last election: 9–10 and 16–17 October 2026
- Next election: 2028

Meeting place
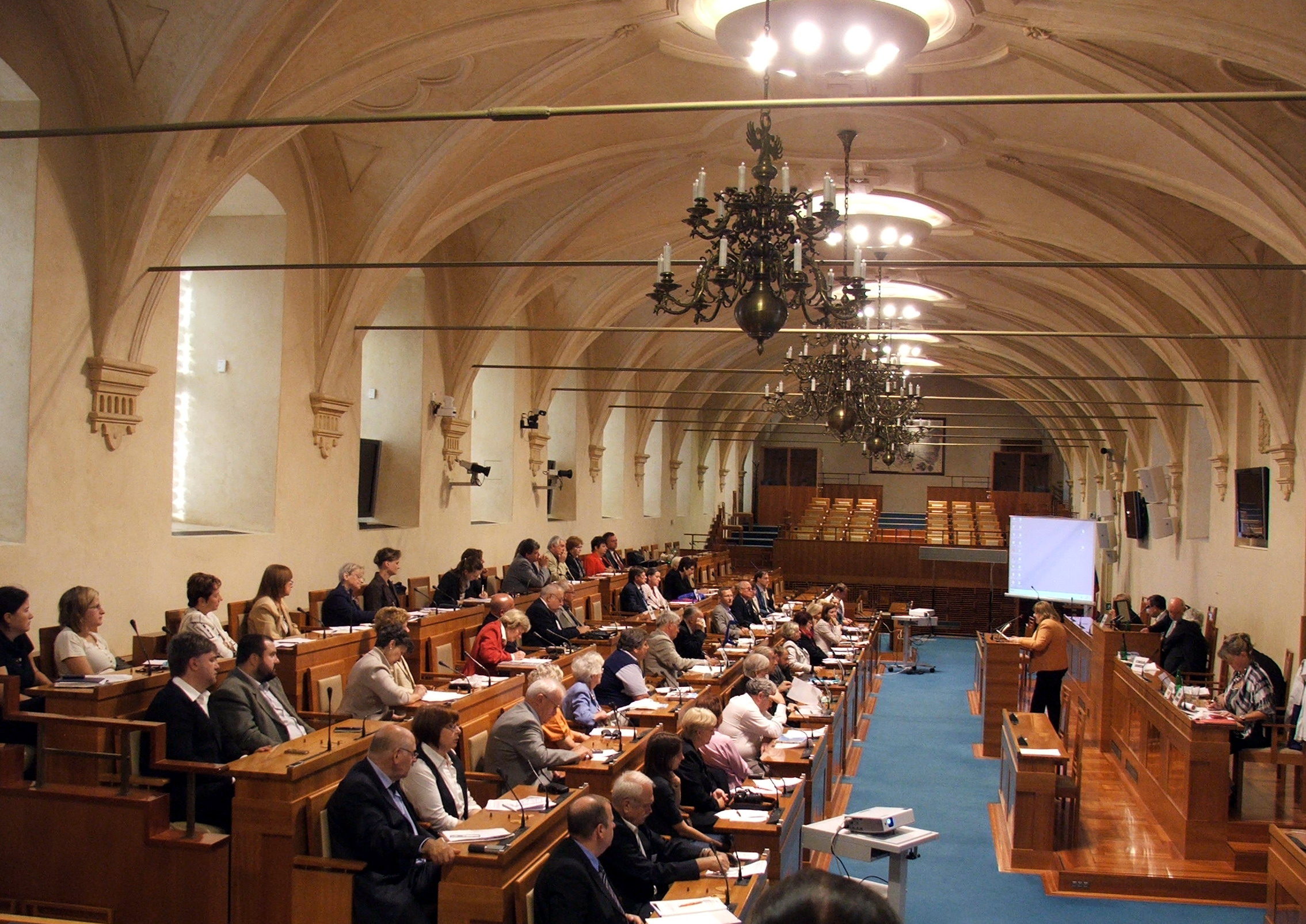
- Wallenstein Palace, Prague

Website
- www.senat.cz/index.php

The Senate (Czech: Senát Parlamentu České republiky, lit. 'Senate of the Parliament of the Czech Republic') is the upper house of the Parliament of the Czech Republic. The seat of the Senate is Wallenstein Palace in Prague.

== Structure ==
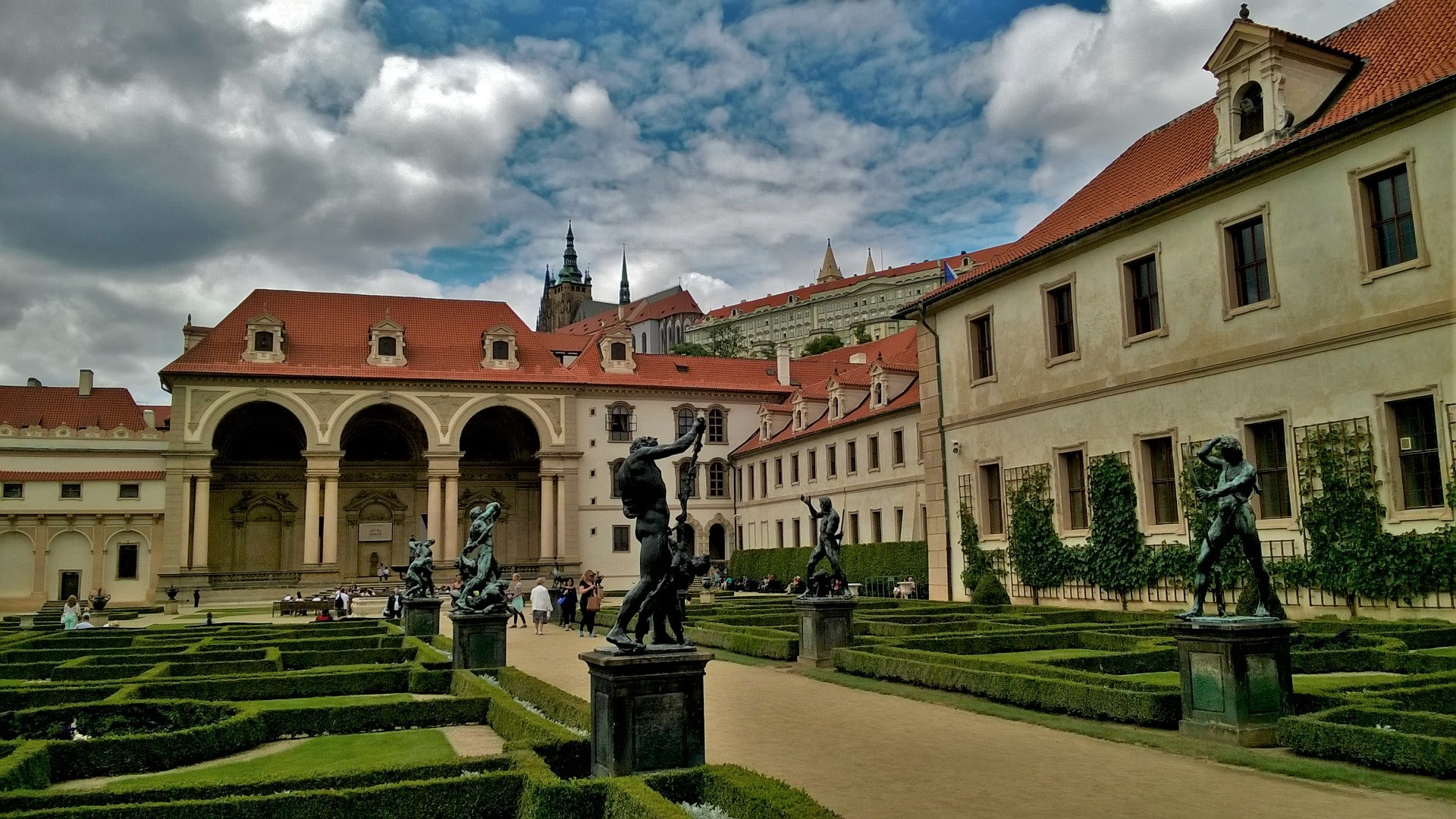
Wallenstein Palace in Prague, the main building of the Senate.

The Senate has 81 members, chosen in single-seat constituencies through the two-round system. If no candidate receives a majority of votes in the first round, there is a second round between the two highest-placed candidates. The term of office for Senators is six years, and elections are staggered so that a third of the seats are up for election every two years. A candidate for the Senate does not need to be on a political party's ticket (unlike in the Chamber of Deputies).

The Senate has one President and four Vice-presidents. Its members participate in specialised committees and commissions. The Senate Chancellery has been created to provide professional, organisational and technical services. The Senate occupies several historical palaces in centre of Prague, in Malá Strana quarter. In 2005 its budget was 561.2 million CZK.

== Powers ==
The Senate can delay a proposed law which was approved by the Chamber of Deputies but this veto can be overridden by a majority (i.e. at least 101 of all 200 members) of the Chamber of Deputies in a repeated vote. If the Senate proposes amendments, Chamber of deputies may approve it with a simple majority or override it with absolute majority. The Senate, however, cannot be overridden when it votes on electoral law, constitutional law and on international treaties.

The Senate decides on confirmation of judges of the Constitutional Court, proposed by the President. It often uses this power to block unacceptable nominants and may propose new laws. However, the Senate does not get to vote on the country's budget or on confidence in the government, unlike the Chamber of Deputies.

The President of the Senate is the second-highest official of the Czech Republic for ceremonial purposes, after the President of the Republic, but the position does not confer much political power.

== Controversy ==
The existence of the chamber has been criticised, including by prominent politicians of the country:

- Former Prime Minister and President Miloš Zeman of the Social Democracy party questioned the need for an upper chamber of government, citing the relatively small population of the Czech Republic and the very low turnout (15.4%) for the 2024 Senate election.
- Prime Minister Andrej Babiš of ANO has said, after the 2024 election, that the Senate was "unnecessary, costly and hampered the legislative process", and proposed to abolish it by asking its members to resign in return for an immediately effective state pension.

Supporters of the Senate argue that it provides protection against majority government coming to power in a "wave of populism".

Political scientist Jiří Pehe believes the abolition of the Senate to be "very unlikely", because the members "would have to agree to its own abolition and it would have to be done with a constitutional majority".

== History ==
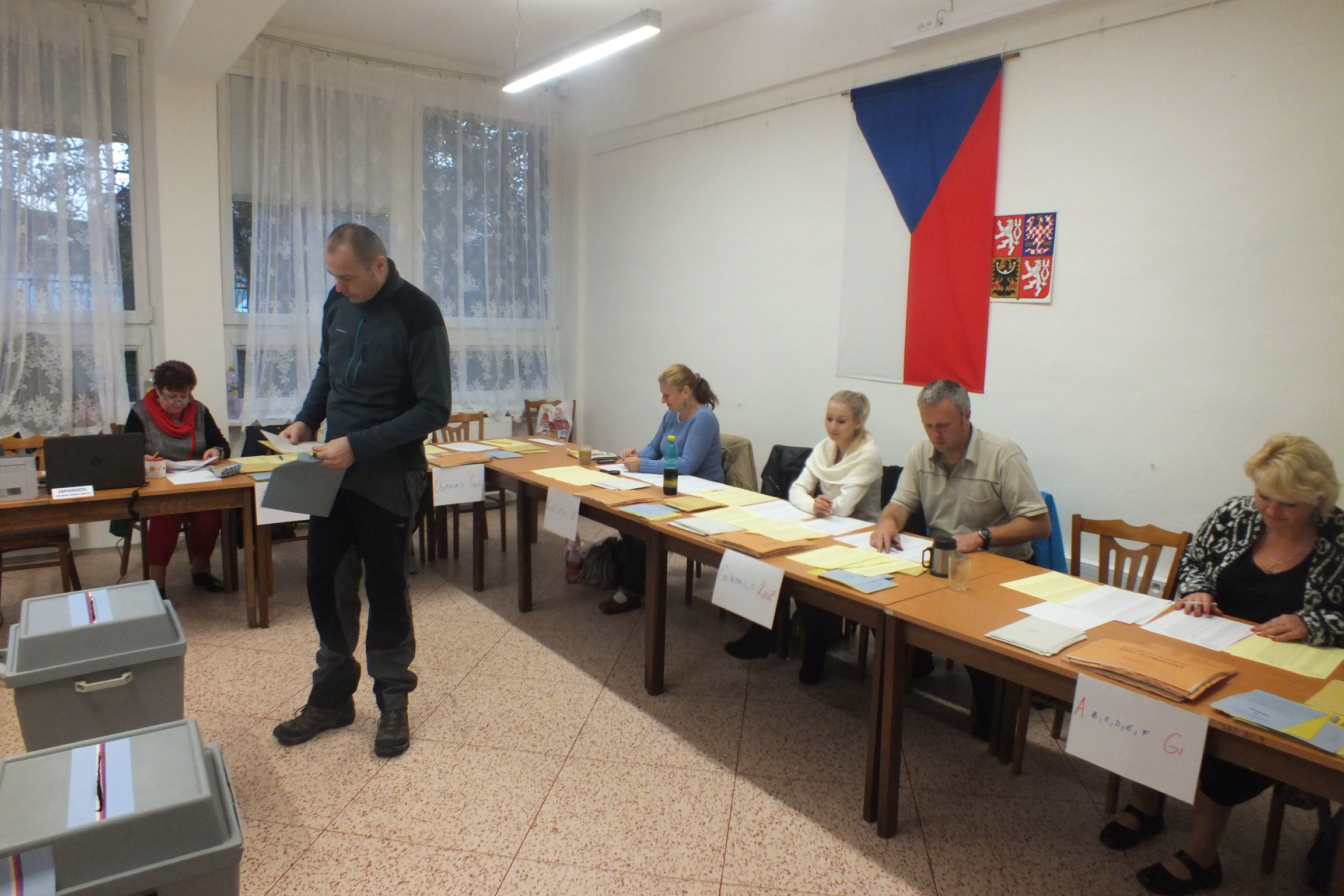
Polling station of the electoral district no. 70 in Olomouc during Czech Senate elections and the regional elections held in the Czech Republic on 7 October 2016

The Senate was established in constitutional law of the Czech National Council (ČNR) No. 1/1993 on 16 December 1992. The immediate reason for its creation was a need to find a place for members of the Federal Assembly, dissolved together with Czechoslovakia. Other reasons given were the positioning of the Senate as a safety device ("pojistka") correcting laws endorsed by lower chamber and as a power balancing tool against the dominance of a single party, especially regarding constitution and electoral law. Due to opposition by the Civic Democratic Alliance (who had members in the Czech National Council, which became the Chamber of Deputies under the new Constitution, but not in the Federal Assembly) and those politicians fearing dilution of power the Senate was not set up. The first elections were held in 1996, with voter turnout around 35% (much lower than turnout for the lower chamber). Further elections were held in accordance with the Constitution every two years after that.

== See also ==
- President of the Senate of the Czech Republic
- List of presidents of the Senate of the Czech Republic
