= Martin Kupka =

Czech politician (born 1975)

Martin Kupka MP
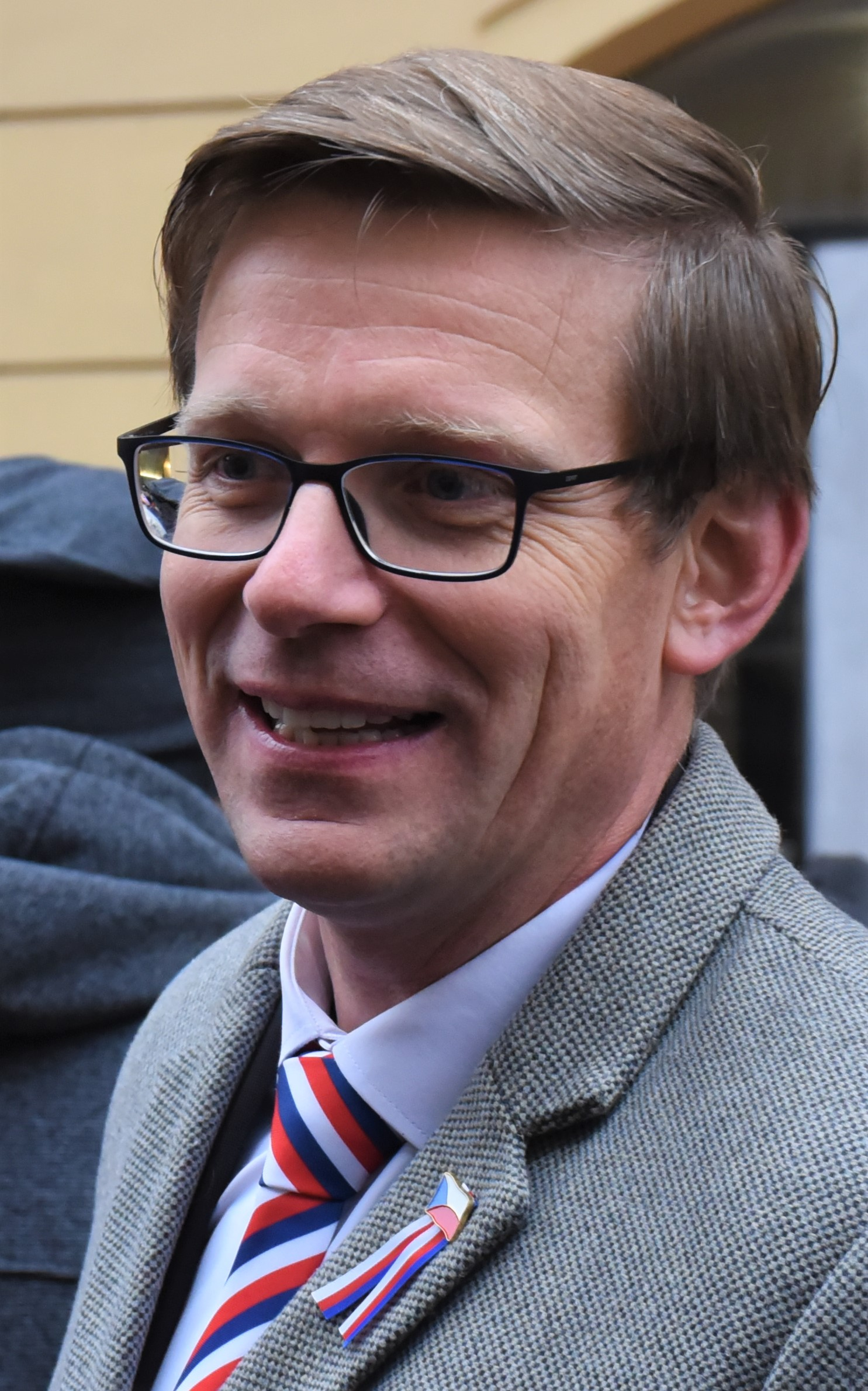
- Kupka in 2022

Leader of the Civic Democratic Party
- Incumbent
- Assumed office 17 January 2026
- Preceded by: Petr Fiala

Minister of Transport
- In office 17 December 2021 – 15 December 2025
- Prime Minister: Petr Fiala
- Preceded by: Karel Havlíček
- Succeeded by: Ivan Bednárik

Member of the Chamber of Deputies
- Incumbent
- Assumed office 26 October 2017 (Note: Kupka was not initially declared elected as an MP, but after a complaint to the Supreme Administrative Court, he was declared as an MP on 19 November 2017, replacing Petr Bendl.)

Mayor of Líbeznice
- In office 15 November 2010 – 20 December 2021

Personal details
- Born: 28 October 1975 (age 50) Jilemnice, Czechoslovakia
- Party: ODS
- Spouse: Dana Kupková
- Education: Charles University
- Website: https://www.martinkupka.eu/

Martin Kupka (born 28 October 1975) is a Czech politician, who has been a member of the Chamber of Deputies (MP) since 2017, and the leader of the Civic Democratic Party (ODS) since 2026. He served as Minister of Transport in the Cabinet of Petr Fiala from 2021 to 2025 and as mayor of Líbeznice from 2010 to 2021.

== Career ==
=== Mayor of Líbeznice (2010-2021) ===
Kupka joined the Civic Democratic Party (ODS) in 2008 and was elected to Líbeznice council with the second highest number of preferential votes from its candidate list. ODS and its allies won 13 out of the 15 seats on the council, and agreed to nominate Kupka for mayor. He was elected mayor in November 2010.

In October 2011, when the Central Bohemian Region approved a plan to expand Vodochody Airport, despite protests from municipalities and experts, Kupka called the decision "a betrayal". He also criticised a report by the EIA on the effects of possible expansion, saying that it did not address the concerns of the affected municipalities. In the meantime, the Central Bohemian Regional Council revised its position on the expansion, and the regional leadership issued a negative opinion on the plan in 2013, which Kupka welcomed on behalf of the initiative.

After his election, Kupka also worked to hasten the completion of the Líbeznice Bypass, but when the bypass was opened in July 2011, he acknowledged that traffic problems remained, as drivers continued to drive through the center of the village.

During the 2013 Czech parliamentary election, Kupka was placed 7th on the ODS candidate list for the Central Bohemian Region, having rejected the offer to be one of the party's lead candidates in the region. He was not elected.

In the 2014 Czech municipal elections, he retained his position on Líbeznice municipal council, heading the ODS list. As the party won the municipal elections with 72.48% of the vote and 11 seats, Kupka began a second term as mayor in November 2014.

=== ODS leadership (since 2014) ===
At the 24th Congress of the Civic Democratic Party on 18 January 2014, Kupka was elected vice-chair of the party after receiving 291 votes. He defended his post at the 27th ODS Congress in January 2016, receiving 343 votes from 463 delegates, then again at the 28th ODS Congress in January 2018, 29th Civic Democratic Congress in January 2020, and 30th Congress in April 2022.

=== 2016—2020: Regional and parliamentary elections ===
In the 2016 Czech regional elections, Kupka was the leader of the ODS list in the Central Bohemian Region and became a regional assembly member.

In the 2017 Czech parliamentary election, Kupka was included on the ODS list in the Central Bohemian Region. However, according to the announced results, with 4.87% votes counted, he missed out on being moved from 31st place to the top of the list by a difference of just 104 votes, and was therefore not elected. However, following a complaint from a voter to the Supreme Administrative Court, preferential votes for ODS candidates in approximately half the region were recounted, and at a hearing on 19 November 2017, the court declared Kupka as an MP instead of Petr Bendl. In the Chamber of Deputies, he served as vice-chair of the committee for public administration and regional development, with party colleagues Jakub Janda and Martin Baxa.

In the 2018 Czech municipal election, Kupka defended his position as a representative in the municipality of Líbeznice, again heading the ODS candidate list. In November, he became mayor of Líbeznice for a third term, before resigning in December 2021 to become Czech Minister of Transport.

In the 2020 Czech regional elections, Kupka was the ODS lead candidate in the Central Bohemian Region. He defended his mandate, with 13,434 preferential votes. On 16 November, Kupka was appointed 1st Deputy Governor for Road Infrastructure. He resigned from this position in January 2022 on becoming Minister of Transport of the Czech Republic.

=== Minister of Transport ===
In the 2021 Czech parliamentary election, Kupka ran for ODS as the third placed candidate on the Spolu coalition's list in the Central Bohemian Region, and eventually topped the list after receiving over 30,000 preference votes. In November, Kupka was nominated as Minister of Transport in Petr Fiala's cabinet, and appointed to the position the following month by President Miloš Zeman at Lány Castle.

=== Leader of the Civic Democratic Party ===
In 2025, Kupka announced his candidacy for the leadership of ODS, and was elected as the party's 5th leader on 17 January 2026.

== Personal life ==
Kupka is married to Dana Kupková and has two children. He spends his free time cycling and skiing.

An avid listener of classical music, Kupka organised the Winter Music Festival in Jilemnice under the banner of Musical Youth while he was student. He was also a presenter on Classic FM radio.

== Controversy ==
After Pavel Kodym ended his first term as head of the Office for Access to Transport Infrastructure, Kupka sent the government a proposal for his reappointment, with effect from 16 February 2023. This procedure was criticised by the lawyers of the anti-corruption movements Transparency International, Prague-based newspaper Oživení, and ANO MP Martin Kolovratník, and the trade union that had recently been established in the office.

== Notes ==
Political offices
Preceded by Karel Havlíček	Minister of Transport; 2021–2025	Succeeded by Ivan Bednárik
Party political offices
Preceded by Petr Fiala	Leader of the Civic Democratic Party; 2026–present	Incumbent
