= 1990 Civic Forum leadership election =

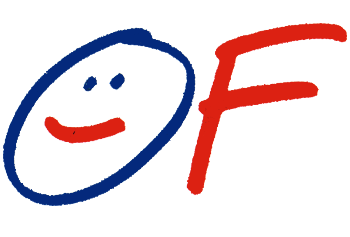
- 13 October 1990
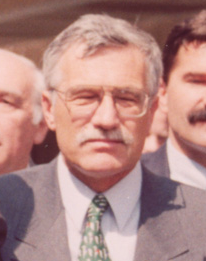

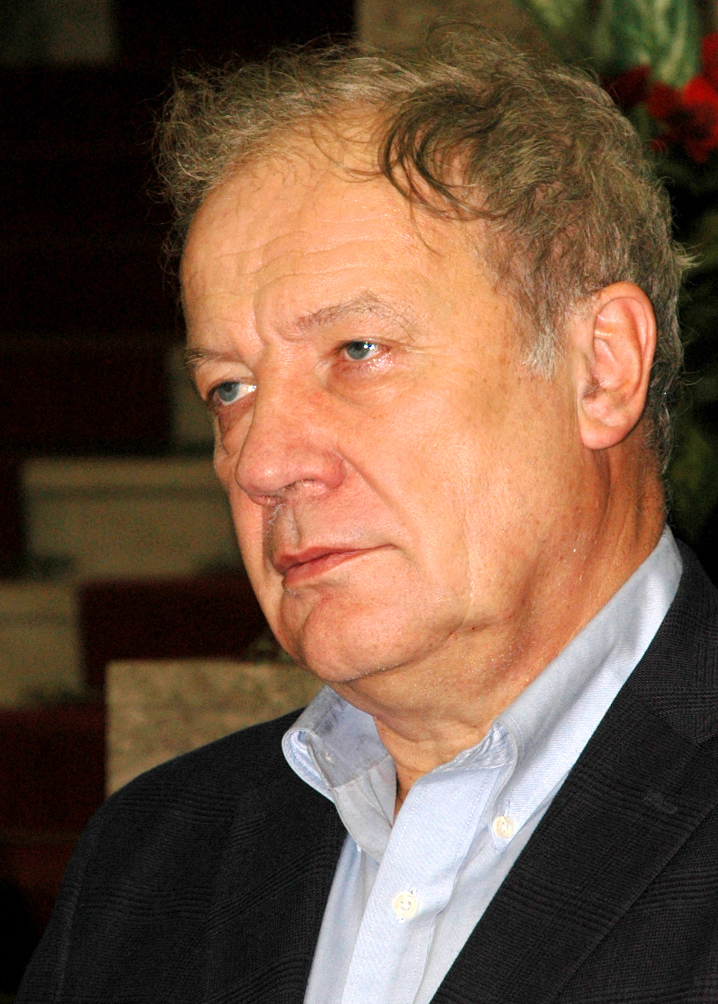
| Candidate | Václav Klaus | Martin Palouš |
| Party | MKDP | MOS |
| Electoral vote | 115 | 52 |
| Percentage | 68.9% | 31.1% |
Leader of Civic Forum before election
none
Elected Leader of Civic Forum
Václav Klaus

A leadership election for the Civic Forum party was held in Czechoslovakia on 13 October 1990. Václav Klaus was elected the leader of the party, defeating Martin Palouš. Election was held in Hostivař. Klaus received 115 votes while Palouš only 52.

== Background ==
Civic Forum was formed in 1989 as a syncretic political movement. Two major wings were formed in the party. Right-wing was represented by Václav Klaus and Miroslav Macek. Centrist wing was represented by Pavel Rychetský, Petr Pithart and Martin Palouš. People representing rightist wing within Civic Forum eventually formed Interparliamentary Club of the Democratic Right (MKDP). Centrists formed Interparliamentary Civic Association (MOS). MKDP wanted Civic Forum to become a right-wing political party while MOS wanted to prevent it.

Leadership election of Civic Forum was scheduled for 13 October 1990 in Hostivař. MKDP supported Václav Klaus for the position. Martin Palouš became a candidate of MOS. Palouš was considered front-runner but Klaus was building his support in regions. Pavel Rychetský also decided to run for the position of the leader. Palouš was endorsed by the Council of Civic Forum.

== Candidates ==
- Václav Klaus - Klaus was a leader of Interparliamentary Club of the Democratic Right (MKDP), a Conservative wing of the party. He also wanted Civic Forum to transform into a right-wing political party. Klaus had strong support from regions but his victory wasn't expected.
- Martin Palouš - Palouš represented Interparliamentary Civic Association (MOS), the Centrist wing of Civic Forum and wanted it to remain a revolutionary political movement. He was close to president Václav Havel.
- Pavel Rychetský - Rychetský withdrew from election before the voting started. He was also part of the centrist wing.

== Voting ==
| Candidate | Votes | |
|---|---|---|
| Václav Klaus | 115 | 68.86 |
| Martin Palouš | 52 | 31.14 |

Voting was held on 13 October 1990. Klaus was considered outsider in the election. Both candidates had their speech to address electors. Klaus talked about division of the movement in economical policy and stated that the future of OF should not be coming from view of limited group in the centre but should start from basis of the people below. Palouš' supporters argued that the new leader should come from people who resisted communist regime. When the vote occurred, Klaus decisively won the election when he received 115 votes to 52.

== Aftermath ==
Klaus' victory was viewed as a surprise. Klaus started to transform Civic Forum into a political party after his victory. This deepened conflicts with Liberal wing that transformed MOS into Liberal Club of the Civic Forum. Conflicts between both wings led to dissolution of Civic Forum in February 1991. It was split to Civic Democratic Party led by Václav Klaus and Civic Movement led by Jiří Dienstbier.
