= Liberal Club of the Civic Forum =

Liberal Club of the Civic Forum Liberální klub Občanského fóra
- Leader: Jiří Dienstbier
- Founded: 1990
- Dissolved: 1991
- Succeeded by: OH
- Ideology: Liberalism
- Political position: Centre
- National affiliation: Civic Forum

Liberal Club of the Civic Forum, or simply Liberal Club (Czech: Liberální klub Občanského fóra, LKOF) was a faction in the Civic Forum.

== History ==
In October 1990, Liberals within the Civic Forum formed the Interparliamentary Civic Association. The Association opposed right wing views within the Civic Forum called Interparliamentary Club of the Democratic Right (MKDP). In October 1990, Association supported Martin Palouš of the Civic Forum during the leadership election. Palouš was defeated by a MKDP candidate, Václav Klaus.

Association was replaced by the Liberal Club in December 1990. It was supported by 90 members of the Federal assembly. The club's goal was to prevent the Civic Forum from becoming a right-wing party. It wanted it to remain a revolutionary big tent movement. Conflicts within the Civic Forum led to its dissolution in February 1991. Liberal Club then became Civic Movement
