= Classic FM =

Classic FM may refer to a number classical music radio stations, including:

- ABC Classic, formerly ABC Classic FM, in Australia
- Classic FM (UK)
  - Classic FM TV, a defunct British TV channel owned by Classic FM
- Classic FM (Bulgaria)
- Classic FM, former name of Classic Praha, in the Czech Republic
- Classic FM (Netherlands), renamed Classicnl
- Classic FM, former name of Hot 1027, in South Africa
- Classic FM (United States), in Syracuse, Utica and Watertown, New York
- KBS Classic FM (KBS 1FM), run by the Korean Broadcasting System in South Korea
