= Young Civic Democrats =

Young Civic Democrats Mladí občanští demokraté
- Founded: 2016
- Headquarters: Prague
- Membership: 2,000
- Ideology: Liberal conservatism Economic liberalism Euroscepticism
- Mother party: Civic Democratic Party
- Website: http://mladi.ods.cz/

Young Civic Democrats (Czech: Mladí občanští demokraté, MOD) is a political platform within the Civic Democratic Party. It consists of young people. It is considered a competitor to the Young Conservatives. It had 2,000 members in January 2018 making it the largest youth wing in the Czech Republic. Its members are also members of the Civic Democratic Party.

== History ==
The platform was founded on 9 December 2016. The platform became a competition to the Young Conservatives (MK). Members of MOD started to compete with MK and defined against it. MOD participated on campaign for the 2017 legislative election. The platform aimed to support individual candidates of ODS and was very active on social media.

Young Civic Democrats supported Jiří Drahoš during 2018 presidential election.
