= Hrdý =

Hrdý (pronounced [ˈɦr̩diː]; feminine form Hrdá [ˈɦr̩daː]) is a Czech and Slovak surname. It is derived from the Czech and Slovak word hrdý meaning "proud."

Notable people with the surname include:

- Edita Hrdá (born 1963), Czech diplomat
- Michal Hrdý (1959–2003), Czech humorist, caricaturist, and illustrator
- Olinka Hrdy (1902–1987), American designer and muralist
- Sarah Blaffer Hrdy (born 1946), American anthropologist and primatologist
