= Young Conservatives =

Young Conservatives may refer to:

== Political parties ==
- Young Conservatives (Czech Republic), the youth wing of the Civic Democratic Party
- Young Conservatives (Denmark), the youth wing of the Conservative People's Party of Denmark
- Young Conservatives (UK), the youth wing of the United Kingdom's Conservative Party
- Young Conservatives of Texas, the nonpartisan conservative youth organization based in Texas
- European Young Conservatives, a grouping of conservative and centre-right parties in Europe
