= Interparliamentary Club of the Democratic Right =

Interparliamentary Club of the Democratic Right Meziparlamentní klub demokratické pravice
- Abbreviation: MKDP
- Leader: Václav Klaus
- Founded: September 1990
- Dissolved: 1991
- Succeeded by: ODS
- Headquarters: Prague, Czechoslovakia
- Ideology: Conservatism; Economic liberalism
- Political position: Right-wing
- National affiliation: Civic Forum

Interparliamentary Club of the Democratic Right (Czech: Meziparlamentní klub demokratické pravice, MKDP) was a faction of the Civic Forum. It represented political right within the movement. It transformed into the Civic Democratic Party after the dissolution of the Civic Forum.

== History ==
The club was formed in September 1990. Its foundation was initiated by Daniel Kroupa. It consisted of 33 members of Czech National Council and 33 members of Federal Assembly. Václav Klaus became its leader. The club announced its principles on 12 October 1990. It advocated Neoliberal economical politics. In December 1990 rival clubs within the Civic Forum were formed. The main rival of MKDP was the centrist Liberal Club led by Jiří Dienstbier. The third important club was the Club of Social Democrats led by Rudolf Battěk, which was the weakest and became an ally of the liberal club.

In October 1990, a leadership election of Civic Forum was held. Václav Klaus became a candidate of MKDP. He faced liberal candidate Martin Palouš. Palouš was considered a front-runner but Klaus defeated him by a large margin and became leader of the Civic Forum. Klaus then tried to transform the Civic Forum into a political party but conflicts between factions led to its dissolution in February 1991. MKDP then transformed into the Civic Democratic Party.

== Ideology ==
MKDP was considered a pro-market conservative wing. It was western-oriented and supported enacting social and economical reforms. Its basic principles included support of Neoliberal economics. It also called for "radical privatization". MKDP wanted the Civic Forum to become a conservative political party. Members of MKDP were considered conservatives.
