= 2026 Civic Democratic Party leadership election =

Czech political party election

- 18 January 2026
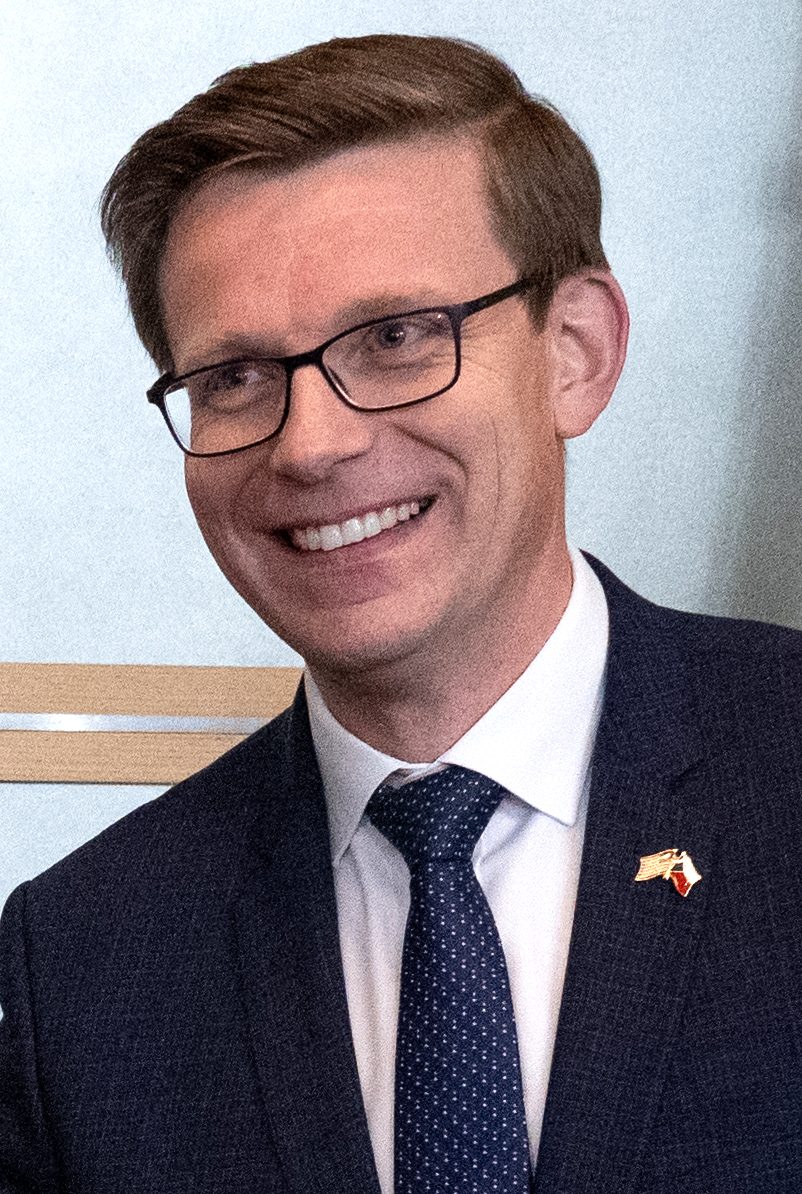

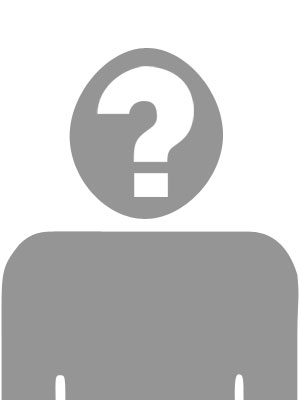
Candidate	Martin Kupka	Radim Ivan
Electoral vote	327	138
Percentage	64.4%	27.2%
Leader of the Civic Democratic Party before election
Petr Fiala
Elected Leader of the Civic Democratic Party
Martin Kupka

The Civic Democratic Party (ODS), a political party in the Czech Republic, held a leadership election on 17 January 2026. The incumbent leader Petr Fiala didn't seek reelection. Martin Kupka was elected the new leader.

== Background ==
Petr Fiala has been the leader of the Civic Democratic Party since 2014. The party formed an electoral alliance with KDU-ČSL and TOP 09 under the name Spolu. Spolu received 27.8% of votes in the 2021 Czech parliamentary election and finished first. As a result, Fiala became Prime Minister of the Czech Republic, and subsequently confirmed his candidacy. He led Spolu to the 2025 Czech parliamentary election but received 23.4% of votes and lost the election to ANO. Fiala stated that he will discuss next steps with his colleagues which will determine whether he will continue as party leader. Deputy leader of the party Martin Kupka then stated that leadership election that was scheduled for April 2026 would be held in January. Kupka was speculated as Fiala's potential successor. Kupka ruled out that he would be running against Fiala.

Fiala announced on 7 October 2025 that he won't be running in the upcoming leadership election for another term. The party's congress was scheduled for 17 and 18 January 2026. Leadership would be part of the congress. Martin Kupka and Martin Kuba were the most speculated candidates following Fiala's announcement. Kupka was viewed as a front-runner. Kuba stated that he needs to see discussion between party members first. On 11 October 2025, Kupka admitted he is considering running. He stated that he will make his decision in several weeks, no later than first half of November. On 23 October 2025, Kupka announced his candidacy. When Líbeznice municipal organisation of ODS gave him its nomination. On 24 October 2025, Radim Ivan announced candidacy. Jana Černochová confirmed she considers running but must discuss it with members of Prague organisation first. Novinky reported that members of South Bohemian organisation are trying to persuade Martin Kuba to run. On 27 November 2025, Kuba announced his departure from the party. On 2 December 2025, Eva Decroix announced on X (formerly Twitter), that she would not run. Kupka received nominations from 11 regional organisations, Ivan did not receive a single nomination.

== Candidates ==
- Radim Ivan, Deputy Mayor of Ostrava-Jih.
- Martin Kupka, Minister of Transport in the Cabinet of Petr Fiala and Deputy Leader of the party.

=== Speculative ===
- Jana Černochová, Minister of Defense in the Cabinet of Petr Fiala.
- Jan Lipavský, Secretary of Foreign Affairs in the Cabinet of Petr Fiala

=== Declined ===
- Petr Fiala, the incumbent leader decided to not seek re-election.
- Martin Kuba, Governor of South Bohemia Region.
- Eva Decroix, Minister of Justice in the Cabinet of Petr Fiala.

== Opinion polling ==
Poll	Martin Kuba	Martin Kupka	Eva Decroix	Jan Skopeček	Alexandr Vondra	Jana Černochová	Pavel Žáček
7 October 2025, CNN Prima News	53.3%	22.6%	8.6%	7.0%	4.2%	3.0%	1.3%

== Voting ==
Candidate	Vote	%
Martin Kupka	327	61.93%
Radim Ivan	138	26.14%
Against all	43	8.14%
Invalid	20	3.79%

Voting was held on 17 January 2026. 508 delegates cast valid votes. Kupka received 327 votes against Ivan's 138 votes and became the new leader.
