= Ivan Bednárik =

Czech-Slovak railway administrator (born 1975)

Minister of Transport
- Incumbent
- Assumed office 15 December 2025
- Prime Minister: Andrej Babiš
- Preceded by: Martin Kupka

Director General of Railways of the Slovak Republic
- In office 15 May 2025 – 12 December 2025
- Preceded by: Alexander Sako
- Succeeded by: Miroslav Garaj

Personal details
- Born: 16 January 1975 (age 51)
- Party: Independent (nominated by SPD) (2025–present)

Ivan Bednárik (born 16 January 1975) is a Slovak railway administrator, who has been the Czech Minister of Transport in the Third cabinet of Andrej Babiš since December 2025. He was director general of Railways of the Slovak Republic from May 2025 to December 2025. From 2020 to 2022, he was chairman and CEO of České dráhy. From 2014 to 2020, he was chairman and CEO of ČD Cargo.

== Personal life ==
Bednárik is a gun owner authorized to carry a firearm for protection. In his 2026 financial disclosure statement, he acknowledged owning firearms worth over 1.2 million CZK (€ 49,000). Bednárik hunts animals and is an active sport shooter in F-class, shooting at targets at distances of up to 1 km.
