= Vodochody =

- Municipality
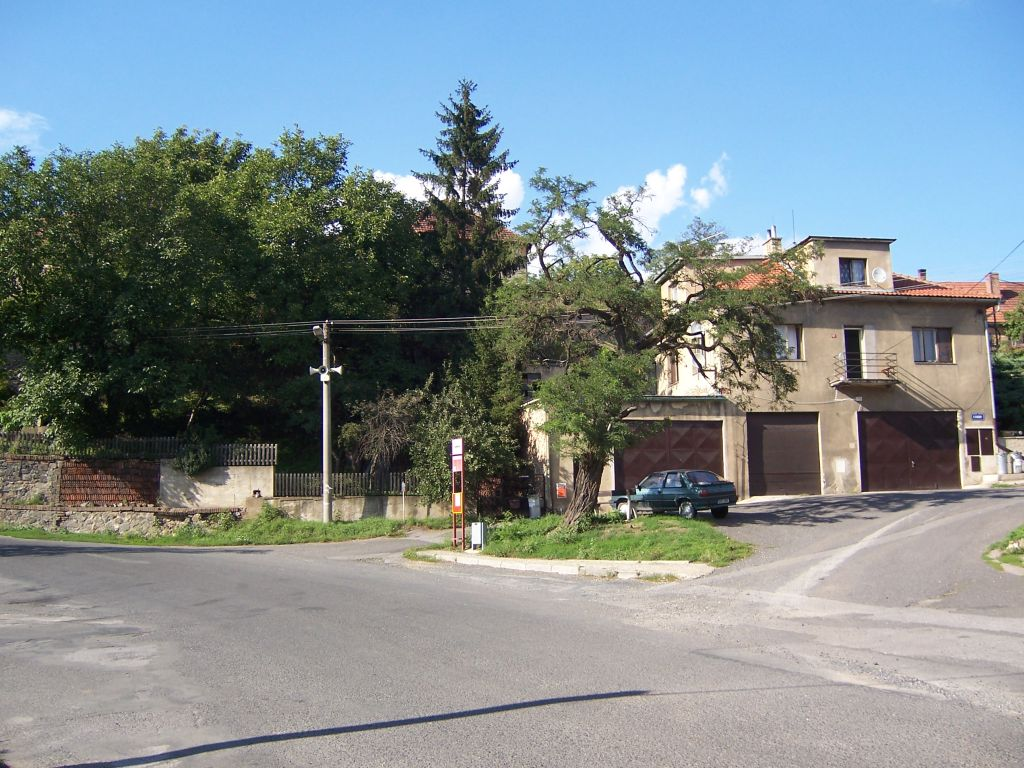
- Centre of Vodochody

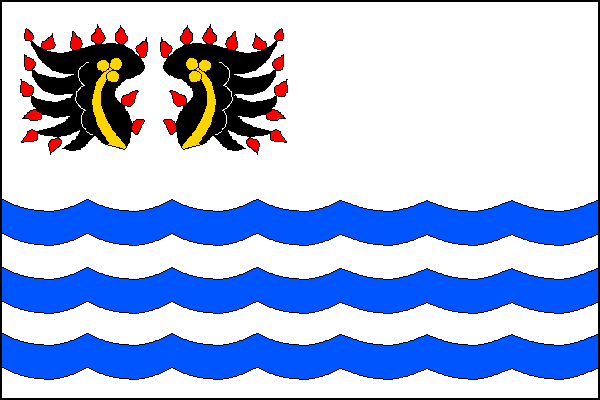
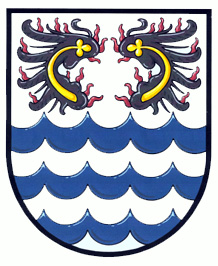
- Flag Coat of arms

- Location in the Czech Republic
- Coordinates: 50°12′25″N 14°23′52″E
- Country: Czech Republic
- Region: Central Bohemian
- District: Prague-East
- First mentioned: 1000

Area
  - Total: 4.96 km^{2} (1.92 sq mi)
- Elevation: 240 m (790 ft)

Population (2026-01-01)
  - Total: 849
  - Density: 171/km^{2} (443/sq mi)
- Time zone: UTC+1 (CET)
  - Summer (DST): UTC+2 (CEST)
- Postal code: 250 69
- Website: www.vodochody.cz

Vodochody is a municipality and village in Prague-East District in the Central Bohemian Region of the Czech Republic. It has about 800 inhabitants.

== Administrative division ==
Vodochody consists of two municipal parts (in brackets population according to the 2021 census):

- Vodochody (382)
- Hoštice (407)

== Etymology ==
The name is derived from the Czech words voda ('water') and chodit ('walk'). The name referred to a "village of people who walk on water", which probably meant "village of fishermen".

== Geography ==
Vodochody is located about 10 kilometres (6 mi) north of Prague. It lies in the Prague Plateau.

== History ==
The first written mention of Vodochody is from 1000.

== Demographics ==
Historical population

| Year | Pop. | ±% |
|---|---|---|
| 1869 | 452 | — |
| 1880 | 502 | +11.1% |
| 1890 | 559 | +11.4% |
| 1900 | 630 | +12.7% |
| 1910 | 626 | −0.6% |

| Year | Pop. | ±% |
|---|---|---|
| 1921 | 609 | −2.7% |
| 1930 | 685 | +12.5% |
| 1950 | 533 | −22.2% |
| 1961 | 554 | +3.9% |
| 1970 | 510 | −7.9% |

| Year | Pop. | ±% |
|---|---|---|
| 1980 | 457 | −10.4% |
| 1991 | 428 | −6.3% |
| 2001 | 449 | +4.9% |
| 2011 | 563 | +25.4% |
| 2021 | 789 | +40.1% |

Source: Censuses

== Transport ==
There is a small airport in the municipal territory, Vodochody Airport. It serves to the aircraft construction company Aero Vodochody, which is located in neighbouring Odolena Voda.

== Sights ==
There are no protected cultural monuments in the municipality.
