= Rudolf Battěk =

Czech sociologist, politician, and political dissident

Ing. Rudolf Battěk

Member of the Czech National Council
- In office March 1969 – September 1969

Member of the Federal Assembly, Speaker of the People's House of the Federal Assembly
- In office 1990–1992

Personal details
- Born: 2 November 1924 Bratislava, Czechoslovakia (present-day Slovakia)
- Died: 13 March 2013 (aged 88) Prague, Czech Republic
- Party: Club of committed non-partisans (KAN) (1968-1969); Czech Social Democratic Party (ČSSD) (1989-1990), Civic Forum (OF) (Club of Social Democrats of the Civic Forum) (1990-1991), Association of Social Democrats, Civic movement (OH) (1991-???), Democrats 92 (1992)
- Spouse: Dagmar Battěková (m. 1950)
- Children: 2
- Awards: Order of Tomáš Garrigue Masaryk III. class (1997)

Rudolf Battěk (2 November 1924–17 March 2013) was a Czech sociologist, politician, and political dissident during the Czechoslovak Communist era.

== Early life ==
Rudolf Battěk was born in Bratislava on 2 November 1924 to Czech parents. From 1934 his family lived in Banská Bystrica. Following the establishment of the independent Slovak state in March 1939, his family moved to Prague. During World War II, Battěk trained as a mechanical locksmith at ČKD Prague. Towards the end of the war, Battěk left his job and joined the anti-Nazi resistance, fighting in the Prague Uprising in 1945.

In 1950, Battěk married Dagmar (née Brzická), and returned to education. He finished his university studies in 1952 and began working as an economist. After he refused to participate in the parliamentary elections of 1958, he was penalised regarding work opportunities, and he returned to work as a locksmith. In 1965, after some rehabilitation, Battěk was accepted as an 'expert worker' to the sociological institute at the Czechoslovak Academy of Sciences (ČSAV).

== Dissident activities ==
Battěk was the founding vice-chair of the Club of Committed Non-Party Members (KAN) in May 1968, which promoted political plurality and advocated for human rights. Following the Warsaw Pact invasion of Czechoslovakia in September 1968, KAN was proscribed by the Czechoslovak National Front, under pressure from the Soviet Union. Battěk served as a representative in the Czech National Council until his removal and arrest in October 1969.

He was imprisoned on two occasions for subversive activities against the Communist regime, in 1972 and 1981. He was a signatory of Charter 77, which criticized the Communist regime for rejecting human rights. He also joined the Committee for the Defense of the Unjustly Prosecuted. In February 1980 he became a spokesperson for the Charter. He spent almost ten years imprisoned by Communist authorities during the 1970s and 1980s, longer than any other Chartist.

== Post-Communist political career ==
Battěk re-entered politics following the Velvet Revolution in 1989. He helped establish the Civic Forum (OF) and was a signatory to its founding proclamation. He joined the Czech Social Democratic Party (ČSSD), but was expelled from the party in June 1990, and became a member of the Association of Social Democrats. In 1993, the ČSSD leadership reversed its decision to expel Battěk and invited him to rejoin the party, but he declined, choosing to remain a member of the Association of Social Democrats. In 1996, Battěk ran for the Czech Senate as an independent from ward 8 in Prague, but was not elected.

In 1997, he was awarded the Order of Tomáš Garrigue Masaryk by President Václav Havel. He died on 17 March 2013, at the age of 88.

== Bibliography ==
- 'Spiritual values, independent activity and politics', Václav Havel and others, Dispute about freedom and power. Kolín nad Rýnem, Exile Publisher INDEX, 1980.
- Essays from the Island. Kolín nad Rýnem, Exile publisher INDEX, 1982.
- 'Spiritual Values, independent initiatives and politics', Paul Wilson (Trans). Václav Havel et al., The Power of the Powerless. London, Hutchinson, 1985.
- Ladies and Gentlemen. Firstly in Samizdat, then Prague, Inverze, 1992.
- Counting Days and Nights Strědokluky, Zdeněk Susa, 2001.
- Like Little Red Riding Hood. Prague: Gallery, 2002.
- Diary 1989. eds. Tomáš Vilímek, Micheala Tučková, Marek Suk. Prague, Ústav pro soudobé dějiny AV ČR. 2020.
