= Classic Praha =

Czech classical music radio station

Classic Praha is a classical music radio station in the Czech Republic. Formerly known as Classic FM, a controlling stake of the operation was bought by Seznam.cz in 2018. Current Chairman of the Civic Democratic Party, Martin Kupka, used to work as a presenter of the station.
