= Civic Democratic Party =

Czech political party

Civic Democratic Party Občanská demokratická strana
- Abbreviation: ODS
- Leader: Martin Kupka
- Deputy Leaders: Tomáš Portlík; Alexandr Vondra; Karel Haas; Pavel Drobil; Martin Červíček
- Chamber of Deputies Leader: Marek Benda
- Senate Leader: Zdeněk Nytra
- MEP Leader: Veronika Vrecionová
- Founder: Václav Klaus
- Founded: 21 April 1991; 35 years ago
- Preceded by: Civic Forum
- Headquarters: Truhlářská 9, Prague
- Think tank: CEVRO; Right Riverbank
- Youth wing: Young Conservatives; Young Civic Democrats
- Membership (2026): ▼10,606
- Ideology: Conservatism
- Political position: Centre-right
- National affiliation: Spolu (2020–2026)
- European affiliation: European Conservatives and Reformists Party
- European Parliament group: European Conservatives and Reformists Group
- International affiliation: International Democracy Union
- Colours: Blue
- Chamber of Deputies: 27 / 200
- Senate: 20 / 81
- European Parliament: 3 / 21
- Regional Councils: 76 / 675
- Regional Governors: 0 / 13
- Local Councils: 2,294 / 61,780
- Prague City Assembly: 9 / 65

Party flag

Website
- ods.cz

The Civic Democratic Party (Czech: Občanská demokratická strana, ODS) is a conservative political party in the Czech Republic. The party sits on the centre-right of the political spectrum. It holds 26 seats in the Chamber of Deputies, and is the second-strongest party by number of seats following the 2025 election. ODS is the only political party in the Czech Republic that has maintained an uninterrupted representation in the Chamber of Deputies since the country's independence. The party is currently led by MP Martin Kupka, who has been leader since 2026.

Founded in 1991 by Václav Klaus as the pro–free market wing of the Civic Forum, and modeled on the British Conservative Party, ODS won the 1992 parliamentary election, and has remained in government for most of the Czech Republic's independence. In every parliamentary election excluding the 2013 election, ODS emerged as one of the two strongest parties. Klaus served as the first prime minister of the Czech Republic after the partition of Czechoslovakia, from 1993 to 1997. Mirek Topolánek, who succeeded him as leader in December 2002, served as prime minister from 2006 to 2009. In the 2010 election, the party lost 28 seats, finishing second, but was able to form a centre-right government with Petr Nečas as prime minister. In the 2013 parliamentary election, the party suffered a heavy defeat after a corruption scandal, and was reduced to 16 seats in the Chamber of Deputies. ODS then remained in opposition until 2021. The party's seat share recovered in the 2017 election, in which they secured 25 seats and became the second largest party. After the 2021 election ODS returned to government as part of the Spolu alliance with TOP 09 and KDU-ČSL.

ODS is a member of the International Democracy Union, and co-founded the soft Eurosceptic European Conservatives and Reformists Party and the European Conservatives and Reformists group in the European Parliament, along with the UK Conservative Party.

== History ==
=== Formation ===
ODS was founded in 1991 as one of two successors to the Civic Forum, a big tent movement that consisted of two major wings. The strongest of the two wings was the Interparliamentary Club of the Democratic Right, which was transformed into the Civic Democratic Party when Civic Forum split. ODS comprised followers of Václav Klaus, and had a more pro–free market orientation than the centrist Civic Movement. An agreement was reached to split the party at the Civic Forum Assembly on 23 February 1991. This was followed on 21 April by the formal declaration of a new party, with Klaus elected as its first leader. The party agreed to continue in a coalition government with the Civic Movement, but this collapsed in July 1991.

The Civic Democrats, who called for a closer Czechoslovak federation, began to organize in Slovakia. Ahead of the 1992 election, ODS ruled out an electoral alliance with the Liberal Democrats, but agreed to an alliance with Václav Benda's Christian Democratic Party (KDS) to boost its appeal to conservatives. ODS won the election, winning 66 seats (and KDS another ten), and formed a centre-right coalition with the Civic Democratic Alliance (ODA) and KDU-ČSL, with Klaus as prime minister.

=== Dominant party (1992–1998) ===
In December 1997, allegations that ODS was receiving illegal donations and maintaining a secret slush fund caused ODA and KDU-ČSL to withdraw from the coalition, and the government collapsed. Josef Tošovský was appointed caretaker, pending new elections in June 1998. Despite the scandal, Klaus was re-elected party leader. In January 1998, some legislators opposed to Klaus, led by Jan Ruml and Ivan Pilip, left the party in the so-called 'Sarajevo Assassination', forming the Freedom Union (US).

=== First Opposition ===
At the elections, ODS dropped again to 63 seats, while the Freedom Union won 19. Due to the split, US refused to support ODS, preventing them from getting a majority; the US leadership also refused to support the Czech Social Democratic Party (ČSSD). As a result, on 9 July 1998, ODS and ČSSD signed the Opposition Agreement, in which ODS pledged to provide confidence and maintain a ČSSD government under Miloš Zeman. This agreement was then superseded by the more explicit 'Patent of Tolerance' in January 2000.

=== Return to government (2006–2013) ===
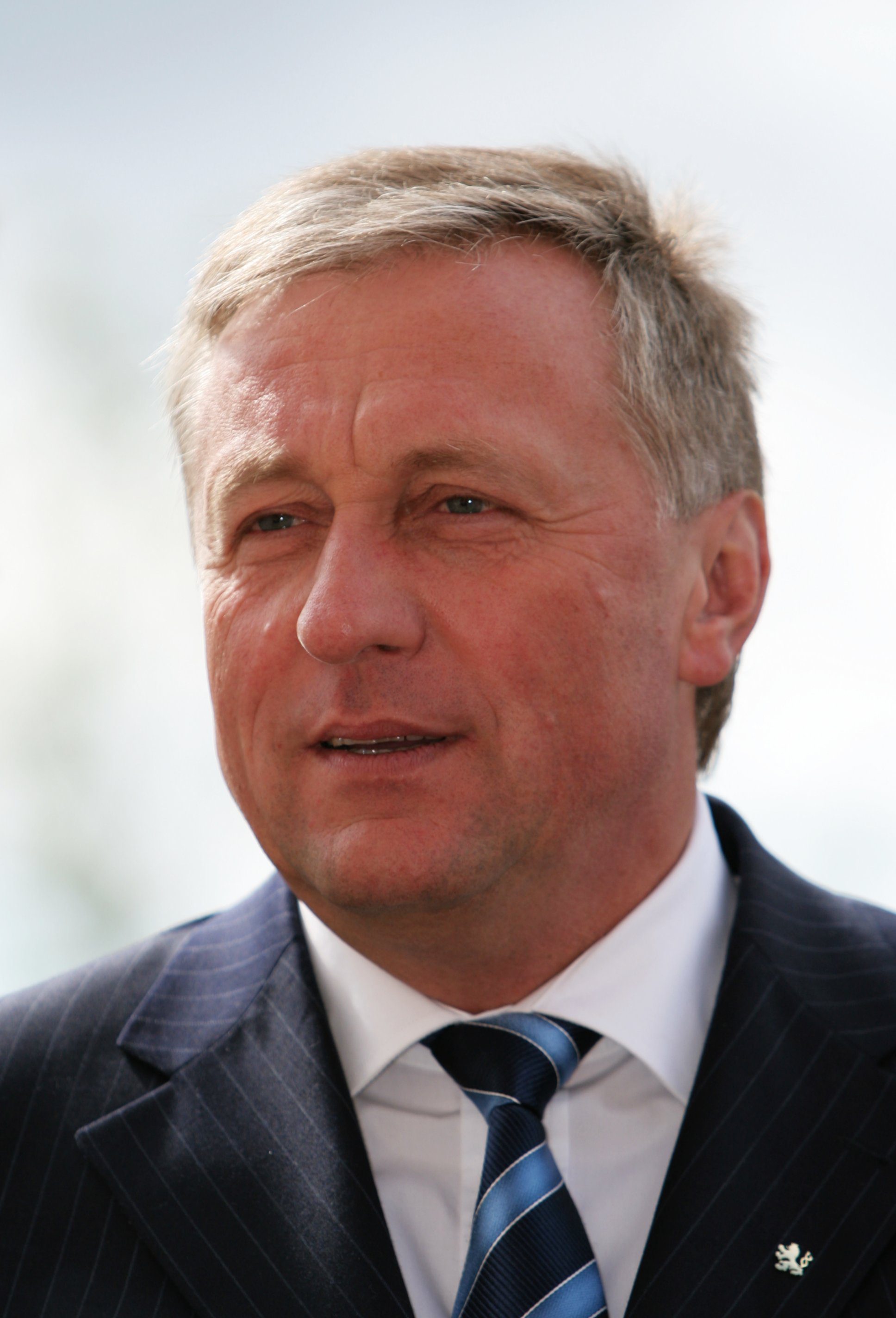
Leader of the Civic Democrats from 2002 until 2010, Mirek Topolánek, led the party to an election victory in 2006 and became the party's first prime minister since 1997.

In the 2006 parliamentary election, ODS again became the largest party in the Chamber of Deputies with 81 seats. ODS initially attempted to make a deal with ČSSD, but talks with the Social Democrat leader Jiří Paroubek were unsuccessful. Mirek Topolánek then presented his first minority cabinet, consisting of Civic Democrats and independents. It was appointed on 4 September 2006 but lost a vote of confidence in the Chamber of Deputies on 3 October 2006.

ODS then formed a second government in coalition with KDU-ČSL and the Green Party (SZ). One of the plans of this cabinet was a reform of public finances. Topolánek also raised the possibility of placing United States missile defences in the Czech Republic, which met with public resistance.

The party suffered heavy losses in regional and Senate elections in 2008, losing all 12 regional governorships it had previously held. However, a year later, ODS won the European Parliament election, keeping all 9 seats and increasing its vote-share from previous elections.

ODS led the government during the Czech Presidency of the Council of the European Union in 2009, dealing with issues such as a gas crisis in Ukraine, conflict in Gaza, and the ongoing economic crisis. There were some controversies during this period, such as Entropa, but other aspects of the Czech presidency, such as the resolution of the gas crisis, were positively evaluated by experts.

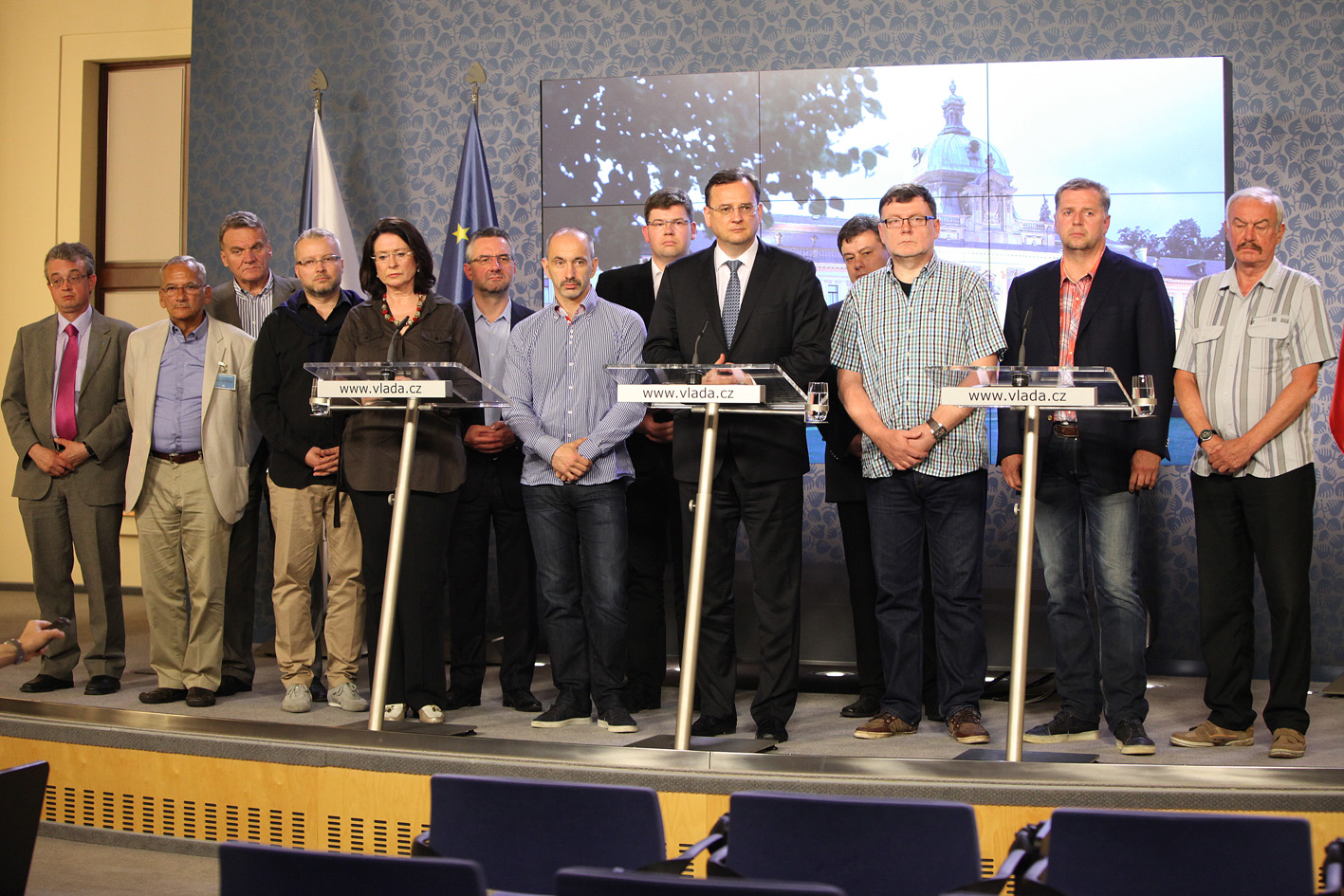
ODS chairman announces government resignation.

ODS nominated Přemysl Sobotka for president of the Czech Republic in the 2013 presidential election, after he won the party's presidential primary in 2012. Sobotka received 2.46% of the vote and did not qualify for the second round. Sobotka's poor result was seen as a reflection of the government's unpopularity and Sobotka's lack of support from within the party. ODS endorsed Karel Schwarzenberg of TOP 09 in the second round, who eventually lost out to Miloš Zeman.

=== Second Opposition (2013–2017) ===
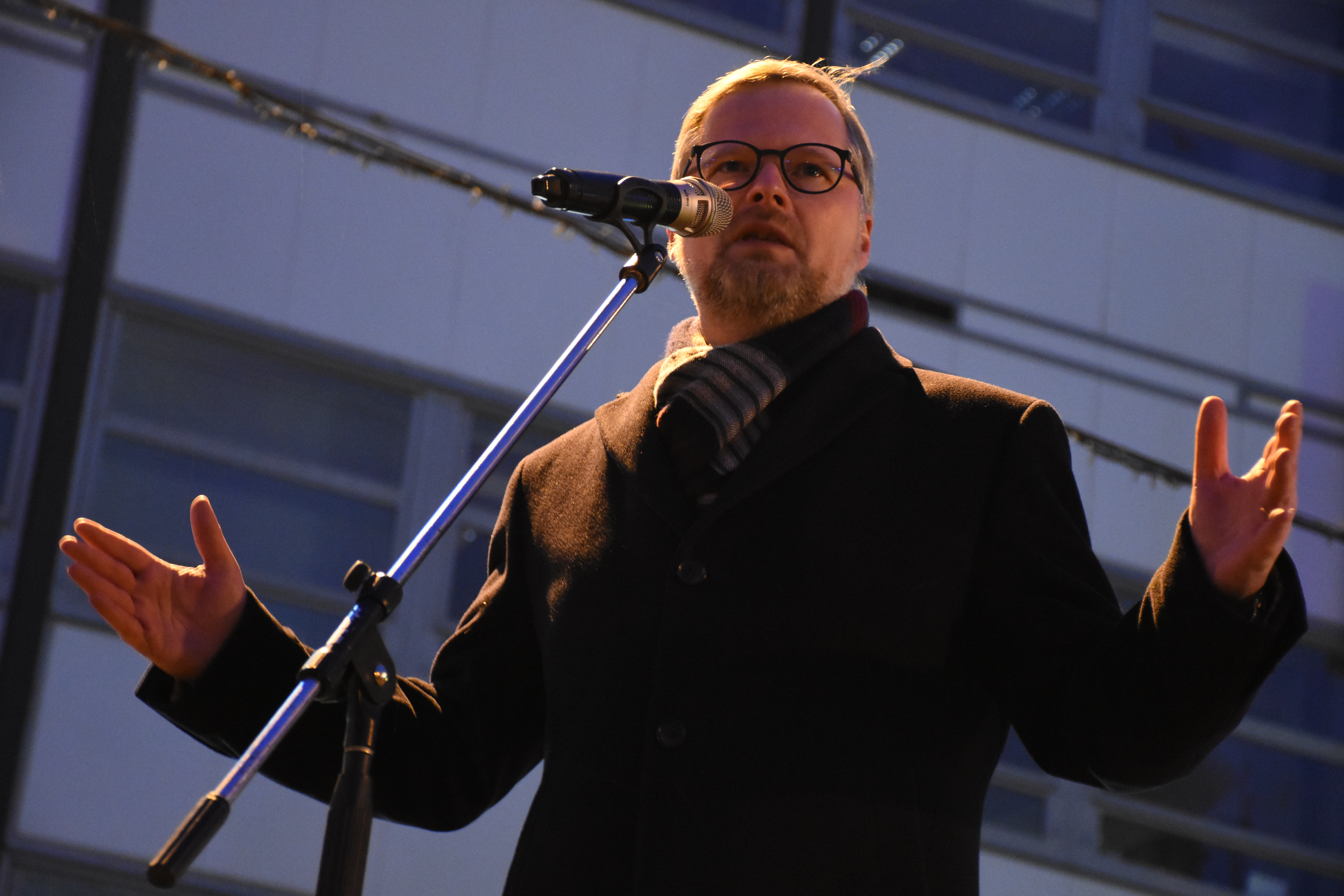
Former party leader Petr Fiala

After the resignation of the cabinet of Petr Nečas, ODS nominated Miroslava Němcová for the role of prime minister, arguing that she would be able to form a coalition and survive a vote of confidence in the Chamber of Deputies. However, President Zeman refused to appoint her, and instead appointed a technocratic cabinet led by Jiří Rusnok. The opposition subsequently called for a dissolution of parliament and early elections, a step which had only recently been made possible by a constitutional amendment. The motion of dissolution passed with 147 out of 200 votes (of 120 required), supported by all parties except ODS, whose deputies left the chamber, including their former coalition partners Public Affairs and TOP 09. President Zeman then called early elections for 25–26 October 2013. ODS suffered heavy losses, finishing 5th with 16 seats. The party also suffered poor results in the European parliament elections and Senate and municipal elections in 2014.

In December 2015, opinion polls showed ODS with 8.6% support nationwide. Some polling agencies and political commentators expressed the opinion that ODS was on the path to become the main centre-right party again.

On 16 January 2016, Fiala was re-elected as ODS leader. At the 2016 regional and Senate elections, ODS received about 10% of votes and its candidates won seats in all regions. Six candidates nominated by ODS qualified for the second round of the Senate elections, where four of them were eventually elected. Fiala said that ODS had returned to being the major Czech right-wing party.

=== Opposition and cooperation with TOP 09 and KDU-ČSL (2017–2021) ===
ODS agreed to participate in the 2017 parliamentary election together with the Freeholder Party, under the label of ODS with the support of Freeholders. This agreement meant that the Freeholders would take 40 places on ODS candidate lists. In February 2017, ODS started a campaign called "We are creating a program", in which ODS leaders toured the Czech regions discussing priorities with supporters and potential voters. On 19 April 2017, ODS introduced its tax program, with plans to lower taxes in order to increase the income of Czech citizens. ODS also called for lower spending on social benefits and subsidies. Chief Whip Zbyněk Stanjura argued that many people were taking advantage of social benefits even though they did not deserve them. These plans resembled ODS policies set out in their 2006 parliamentary election manifesto. The tours concluded with the "Strong program for a strong Czech Republic" conference on 22 April, where ODS presented their election manifesto and candidates.

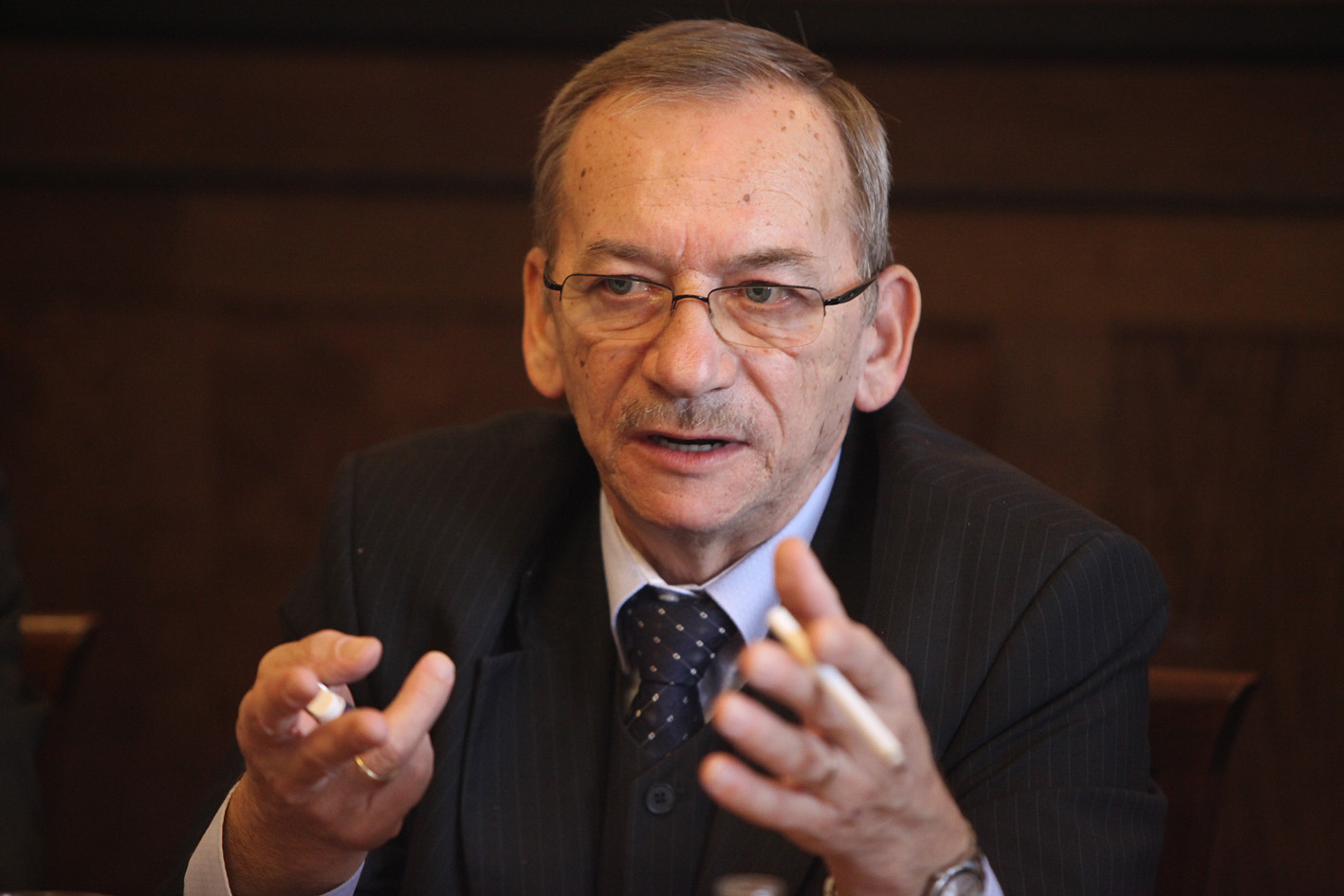
Jaroslav Kubera, ODS leader of the Senate (2018–2020)

Following the 2017 Czech government crisis, ODS rose in the polls, approaching ČSSD. A poll by TNS Kantar suggested that ODS would become the second strongest party, surpassing ČSSD and KSČM. ODS launched its 2017 election campaign on 29 May, inspired by the British Conservative Party's campaign for the 2017 general election.

ODS received 11% in the 2017 parliamentary election, becoming the second largest political party in the Czech parliament. The party then won the 2018 Senate election, confirming its position as the main Czech right-wing party.

ODS, KDU-ČSL and TOP 09 formed an alliance of conservative opposition parties in late 2020, known as the "Three Coalition", before launching their slogan and program on 9 December 2020, announcing that they would run under the name Spolu ("together") in the 2021 parliamentary election. The alliance announced that Petr Fiala would be their candidate for prime minister.

Spolu ran in the 2021 parliamentary election with Fiala as leader. Opinion polls suggested that ANO 2011 would win the election, but in an electoral upset, Spolu won the highest number of votes, and opposition parties took a majority of seats in parliament. The opposition parties signed a memorandum agreeing to nominate Fiala as the new prime minister.

=== Return to power (2021–2025) ===
ODS formed a coalition government with the Mayors and Independents (STAN), KDU-ČSL, TOP 09, and the Czech Pirate Party after the election. Petr Fiala became the new prime minister. ODS held six seats in Fiala's Cabinet. The ODS-led coalition was defeated in the 2025 election by ANO.

On 27 November 2025, Governor of South Bohemia Region Martin Kuba announced his departure from the party. Senator Zbyněk Sýkora announced his departure from the party on 1 December 2025.

=== Third opposition (2026–present) ===
On 17 January 2026, Martin Kupka won the ODS leadership election with 327 out of 508 votes, defeating Radim Ivan.

== Ideology ==
ODS is variously described as conservative, liberal-conservative, and conservative-liberal. The party was a key driver of economic liberalism in the first two decades of the Czech Republic, and is Eurosceptic. There are also multiple ideological factions in the party, including the national conservative faction, the national liberal faction, the progressive faction, the neoconservative faction and the Christian socially conservative faction (former Christian Democratic Party).

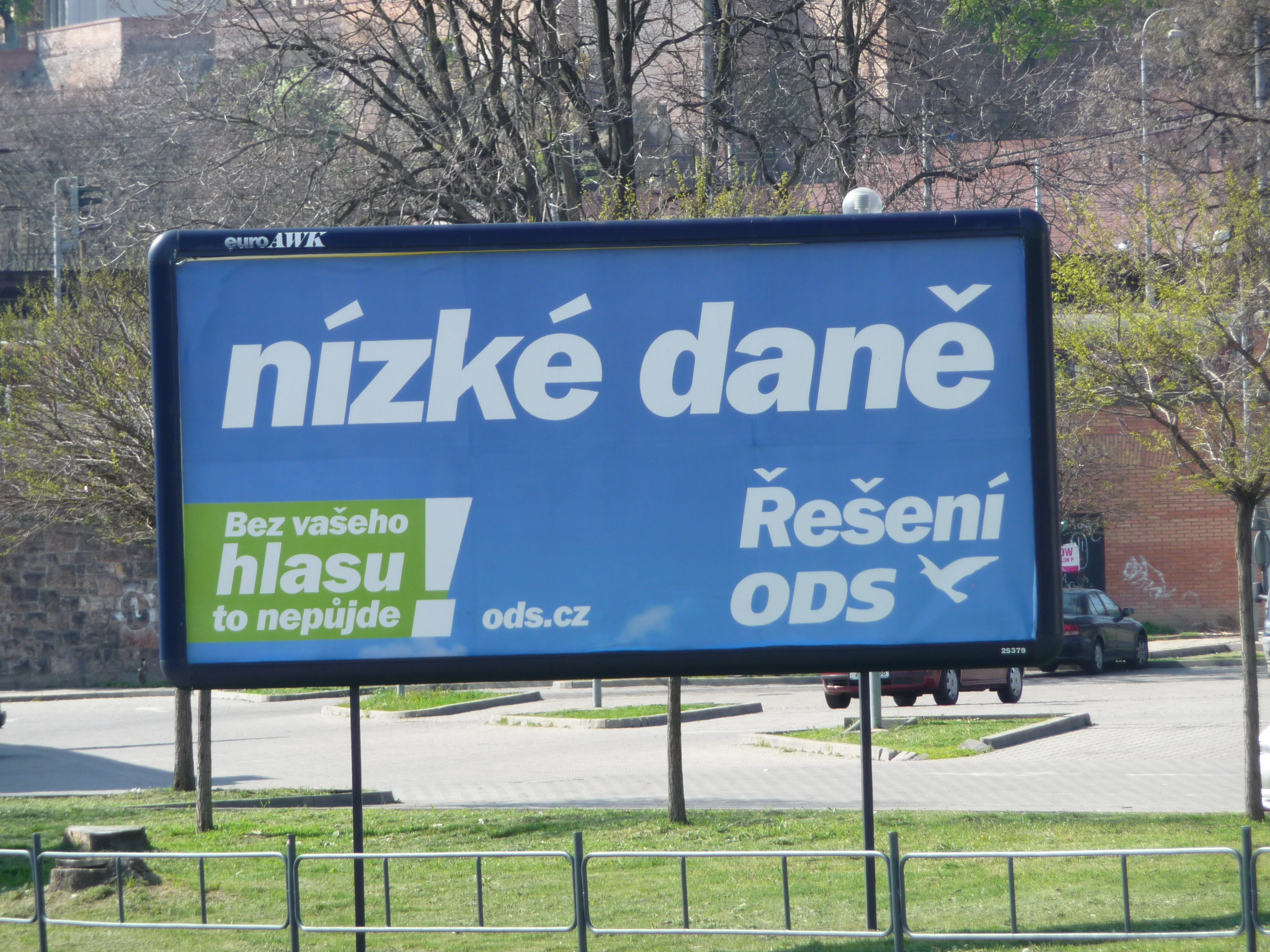
Pre-election billboard with the inscription "Low taxes – ODS solution" in 2010

The party's ideas are very close to those of the British Conservative Party, Swedish Moderate Party, and other liberal-conservative parties in Europe. The party's program states "low taxes, public finances and future without debts, support for families with children, addressable social system, reducing bureaucracy, better conditions for business, a safe state with the transatlantic links. No tricks and populism."

Many prominent ODS politicians have stated their opposition to "political correctness", and have called for tougher measures to combat radical Islam, which they liken to Nazism.

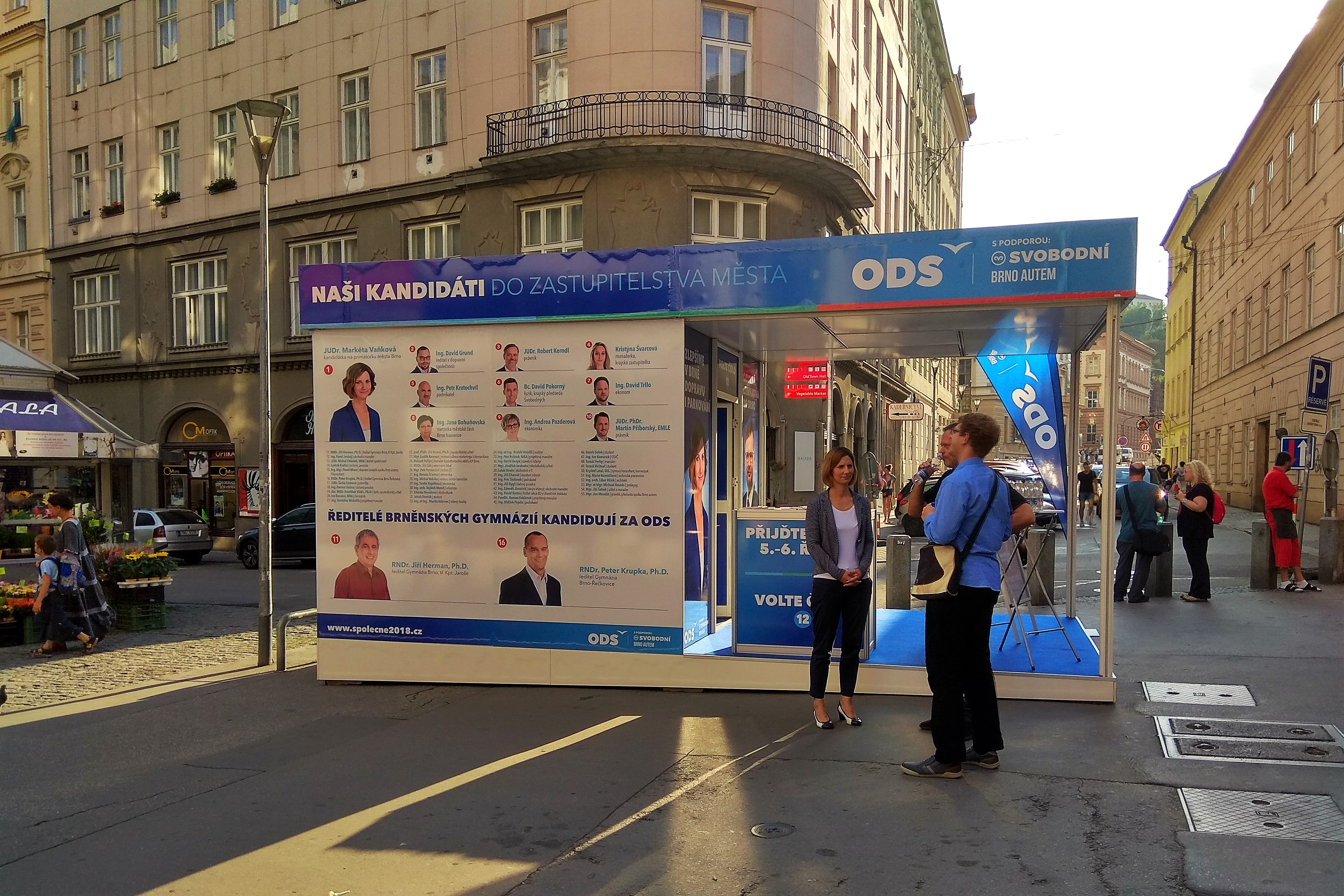
Pre-election meeting in Brno in 2018

Although ODS was in power when the Treaty of Lisbon was ratified in the Czech Republic, the party supports maintaining Czech sovereignty and integrity against the European Union, calls for a fundamental reform of the EU, and strongly opposes any federalisation of the European Union. Following the EU referendum in the United Kingdom, which resulted in Brexit, ODS leader Petr Fiala said the Czech Republic "should reconsider its priorities and strategy in the European Union" and if the EU Treaties were to be re-opened, negotiate new conditions for the country such as an opt-out from asylum rules as well as from the obligation to adopt the euro. The party is a member of the national-conservative European Conservatives and Reformists Group.

ODS is opposed to compulsory EU migrant quotas, arguing that all individual nations should have the right to determine their own immigration policies. The party says that forcing nations to take in migrants without sufficient vetting or orderly processing and integration poses a threat to national security, social cohesion and native European culture.

ODS also supports the right of citizens to own and carry firearms, unlike some of the other parties they are based on, especially the British Conservatives, which reject the idea that anyone has a right to own and carry firearms and other weapons. This makes ODS much more similar to the United States Republican Party in this matter. However, ODS still supports gun control measures (including background checks, licenses and registration). ODS, especially Defence Minister Jana Černochová, was among the main supporters of an amendment to the Czech constitution guaranteeing the right to keep and bear arms for the purposes of national security, although it was Social Democrat Milan Chovanec who originally proposed this. The amendment failed in the Senate, but a similar bill passed in 2021.

== Symbols ==
=== Name ===
Václav Klaus stated that the party's name emphasises that ODS is based on the idea of civic freedoms, and also that it is a Civic Party, which differentiates it from other parties that existed prior to 1991. The adjective 'Democratic' means that ODS should protect parliamentary democracy.

Besides its official name, ODS is sometimes called the "Blue Party", and its members are sometimes informally known as "the Blues" or "the Blue Birds", due to the party's association with the color blue.

=== Logo ===
The first logo, created by Aleš Krejča, was introduced on 4 June 1991, having been chosen from over 250 entries in a public competition.

A new logo, created by Petr Šejdl, was introduced in 1992, including the silhouette of a bird in blue. In 1994 the bird's tail was shortened, and in 1998 the font was changed following the "Sarajevo betrayal" of autumn 1997, in which ODS members used allegations of bribery to precipitate the resignation of Václav Klaus' government while he was on a trip to Sarajevo. The party used this version until 2015, with modifications for individual election campaigns.

ODS introduced a new logo at a party congress in Prague in 2015, designed by Libor Jelínek. The design of the bird was updated to fly upwards rather than to the left.

Party logo, 1991–1992

Party symbol, 1994–2015

Current logo, since 2015

== Organisation ==
=== Party structure ===
The highest body of ODS is the party congress, which meets every year and elects the leadership every two years. Between party congresses, the party is led by the Executive Council, which meets every month, and the Republic Assembly. Between council meetings, the party is led by a panel consisting of the party leader, deputy leaders and chief whips of the ODS parliamentary party.

The party is structured according to the subdivisions of the Czech Republic, consisting of local associations, which group to become areas, which are then organised into regional branches.

=== Membership ===
| Year | Members | Ref. | Year | Members | Ref. | Year | Members | Ref. | Year | Members | Ref. |
|---|---|---|---|---|---|---|---|---|---|---|---|
| 1991 | 18,500 | | 2001 | 18,280 | | 2011 | 27,648 | | 2021 | 12,500 | |
| 1992 | 23,000 | | 2002 | 20,412 | | 2012 | 24,507 | | 2022 | 12,049 | |
| 1993 | | | 2003 | 21,641 | | 2013 | 21,578 | | 2023 | 11,543 | |
| 1994 | | | 2004 | 23,138 | | 2014 | 17,944 | | 2024 | 11,070 | |
| 1995 | 21,803 | | 2005 | | | 2015 | 14,771 | | 2025 | 10,720 | |
| 1996 | | | 2006 | | | 2016 | 14,123 | | 2026 | 10,606 | |
| 1997 | | | 2007 | | | 2017 | 14,005 | | | | |
| 1998 | 16,000 | | 2008 | | | 2018 | 14,123 | | | | |
| 1999 | 19,300 | | 2009 | 34,000 | | 2019 | 13,600 | | | | |
| 2000 | 17,000 | | 2010 | 31,011 | | 2020 | 13,550 | | | | |

ODS had 18,500 members in 1991. The number of members grew with the party's influence and rose to over 23,000, before decreasing to 16,000 during the political crisis of 1998. Party membership then began rising again, reaching a peak in 2010 of 31,011. The member base started to decline rapidly after 2010, down to 17,994 members ahead of the 2013 election. ODS had 14,771 members in May 2015.

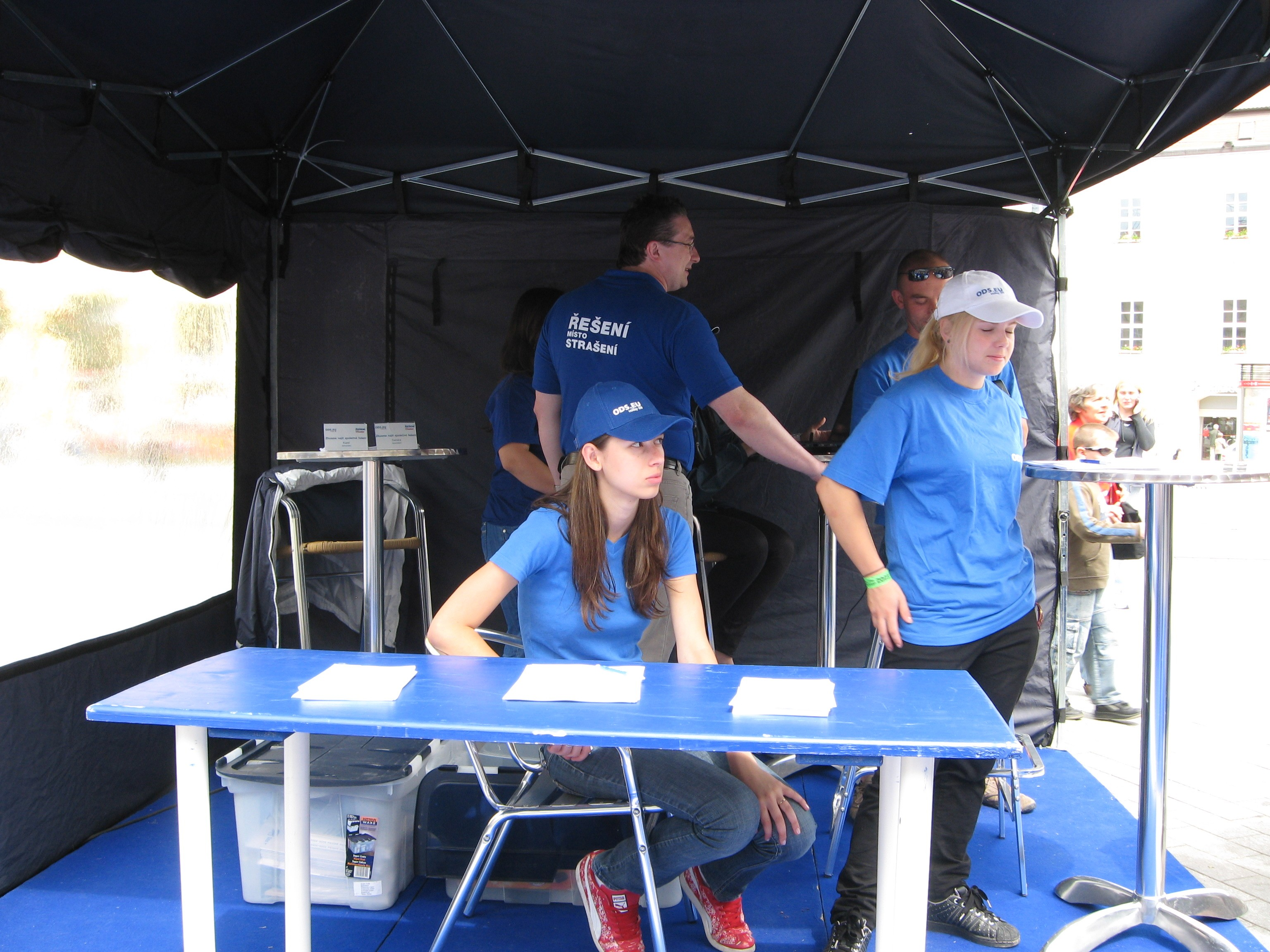
Blue Team kiosk during an election campaign in Brno

The party runs a membership organisation known as Supporters of ODS, a looser form of involvement designed for people who do not want join ODS but sympathize with its program. This replaced the organisation known as the Blue Team.

=== Young Conservatives ===
The party's youth wing is the Young Conservatives (Czech: Mladí konzervativci, MK), open to young people from 15 to 35 years old. The founding congress of MK was held on 8 December 1991, following preparations by the Charter of Young Conservatives, a group of students at the Brno University of Technology and the Všehrd Law Students' Association at the Faculty of Law of Charles University. The Young Conservatives organize various events, including meetings with local and national politicians, election campaigns, and international events.

=== CEVRO Liberal Conservative Academy ===
The CEVRO Liberal Conservative Academy (Czech: CEVRO Liberálně konzervativní akademie) is a think-tank affiliated with ODS, established in 1999, which aims to promote political education and liberal-conservative thinking. In 2005, CEVRO established a private university known as the CEVRO Institute. CEVRO runs four newspapers: CEVRO Revue, The Week in European Politics, The Week in Czech Politics and Fortnightly.

=== International organisations ===
ODS joined the European Democrat Union (EDU) in 1992, as one of the first member parties from the former Eastern Bloc. Václav Klaus became a vice-president of the EDU. ODS remained in the EDU until it became part of the European People's Party (EPP) in 2002; ODS refused to join EPP due to ideological differences, and instead joined the European Democrats.

ODS joined the International Democracy Union (IDU) in 2001. ODS leaders have served as vice-presidents of the IDU.

In July 2006, the Civic Democratic Party signed an agreement with the British Conservative Party to leave the European People's Party–European Democrats (EPP-ED) group in the European Parliament, and form the Movement for European Reform in 2009. On 22 June 2009, it was announced that ODS would join the newly formed European Conservatives and Reformists (ECR) parliamentary group, an anti-federalist and Eurosceptic group. ODS was also one of the founding members of the European Conservatives and Reformists Party (ECR Party), a conservative and Eurosceptic European political party promoting conservative and economically liberal principles. Other contemporary members of the ECR party included the Conservative Party, Law and Justice, and Freedom and Solidarity.

=== Current ===
| Position | Name | Photo | Since |
|---|---|---|---|
| Chairman | Martin Kupka | | 17 January 2026 |
| 1st vice-chairman | Tomáš Portlík | | 17 January 2026 |
| Vice-chairman | Alexandr Vondra | | 18 January 2014 |
| Vice-chairman | Karel Haas | | 18 January 2026 |
| Vice-chairman | Pavel Drobil | | 18 January 2026 |
| Vice-chairman | Martin Červíček | | 18 January 2026 |
| Chairman of Deputies Caucus | Marek Benda | | 13 December 2021 |
| Chairman of Senate Caucus | Zdeněk Nytra | | 19 October 2020 |
| Chairman of EP Caucus | Veronika Vrecionová | | 5 June 2023 |

=== Leaders ===
| No. | Name | Photo | Since | Until |
|---|---|---|---|---|
| 1 | Václav Klaus | | 21 April 1991 | 15 December 2002 |
| 2 | Mirek Topolánek | | 15 December 2002 | 13 April 2010 |
| 3 | Petr Nečas | | 20 June 2010 | 17 July 2013 |
| 4 | Petr Fiala | | 18 January 2014 | 17 January 2026 |
| 5 | Martin Kupka | | 17 January 2026 | Incumbent |

Note: Only properly elected leaders are included.

== Election results ==
=== Czechoslovakia elections ===
==== Chamber of People ====
| Election | Leader | Coalition | | | Seats | +/– | Position | Status |
| Election | Leader | Parties | Votes | % | Seats | +/– | Position | Status |
|---|---|---|---|---|---|---|---|---|
| 1992 | Václav Klaus | ODS–KDS | 2,200,937 | 23.0 | 48 / 150 | New | 1st | Coalition |

==== Chamber of Nations ====
| Election | Leader | Coalition | | | Seats | +/– | Position | Status |
| Election | Leader | Parties | Votes | % | Seats | +/– | Position | Status |
|---|---|---|---|---|---|---|---|---|
| 1992 | Václav Klaus | ODS–KDS | 2,168,421 | 22.6 | 37 / 150 | New | 1st | Coalition |

==== Czech National Council ====
| Election | Leader | Coalition | | | Seats | +/– | Position | Status |
| Election | Leader | Parties | Votes | % | Seats | +/– | Position | Status |
|---|---|---|---|---|---|---|---|---|
| 1992 | Václav Klaus | ODS–KDS | 1,924,483 | 29.7 | 66 / 200 | ▲33 | ▲1st | Coalition |

==== Slovak National Council ====
| Election | Leader | Coalition | | | Seats | +/– | Position | Status |
| Election | Leader | Parties | Votes | % | Seats | +/– | Position | Status |
|---|---|---|---|---|---|---|---|---|
| 1992 | Ľudovít Kaník | DS–ODS | 102,058 | 3.31 | 0 / 150 | 0 | ▲8th | No seats |

=== Czech Republic elections ===
==== Chamber of Deputies ====
| Election | Leader | Votes | % | Seats | +/– | Rank | Government |
|---|---|---|---|---|---|---|---|
| 1996 | Václav Klaus | 1,794,560 | 29.6 | 68 / 200 | ▲2 | 1st | Coalition |
| 1998 | Václav Klaus | 1,656,011 | 27.7 | 63 / 200 | ▼5 | ▼2nd | Opposition with other arrangements |
| 2002 | Václav Klaus | 1,166,975 | 24.5 | 58 / 200 | ▼5 | 2nd | Opposition |
| 2006 | Mirek Topolánek | 1,892,475 | 35.3 | 81 / 200 | ▲23 | ▲1st | Minority (2006–2007) |
| 2006 | Mirek Topolánek | 1,892,475 | 35.3 | 81 / 200 | ▲23 | ▲1st | Coalition (2007–2009) |
| 2006 | Mirek Topolánek | 1,892,475 | 35.3 | 81 / 200 | ▲23 | ▲1st | Coalition (2009–2010) |
| 2010 | Petr Nečas | 1,057,792 | 20.2 | 53 / 200 | ▼28 | ▼2nd | Coalition |
| 2013 | Miroslava Němcová | 384,174 | 7.7 | 16 / 200 | ▼37 | ▼5th | Opposition |
| 2017 | Petr Fiala (Note: With participation of the Freeholder Party of the Czech Republic candidates on the party list.) | 572,962 | 11.3 | 25 / 200 | ▲9 | ▲2nd | Opposition |
| 2021 | Petr Fiala | 1,493,701 | 27.8 | 34 / 200 | ▲9 | 2nd | Coalition |
| 2021 | Part of SPOLU coalition, which won 71 seats in total | | | | | | |
| 2025 | Petr Fiala | 1,313,346 | 23.4 | 27 / 200 | ▼6 | 2nd | Opposition |
| 2025 | Part of SPOLU coalition, which won 52 seats in total | | | | | | |

==== Senate ====
| Election | Cand. | First round | | | | Second round | | | Seats | Total seats | +/– |
| Election | Cand. | Votes | % | Runners-up | Place | Votes | % | Place | Seats | Total seats | +/– |
|---|---|---|---|---|---|---|---|---|---|---|---|
| 1996 | 81 | 1,006,036 | 36.5 | 76 / 81 | 1st | 1,134,044 | 49.2 | 1st | 32 / 81 | 32 / 81 | ▲32 |
| 1998 | 27 | 266,377 | 27.7 | 22 / 27 | 1st | 210,156 | 39.1 | 1st | 9 / 27 | 26 / 81 | ▼6 |
| 2000 | 27 | 203,039 | 23.6 | 18 / 27 | 1st | 166,133 | 29.5 | 1st | 8 / 27 | 22 / 81 | ▼4 |
| 2002 | 27 | 165,794 | 24.9 | 19 / 27 | 1st | 284,537 | 34.6 | 1st | 9 / 27 | 26 / 81 | ▲2 |
| 2004 | 27 | 241,120 | 33.3 | 25 / 27 | 1st | 257,861 | 53.8 | 1st | 19 / 27 | 37 / 81 | ▲15 |
| 2006 | 27 | 354,273 | 33.3 | 26 / 27 | 1st | 289,568 | 50.4 | 1st | 14 / 27 | 41 / 81 | ▲4 |
| 2008 | 27 | 252,827 | 24.1 | 20 / 27 | 2nd | 266,731 | 32.4 | 2nd | 3 / 27 | 35 / 81 | ▼6 |
| 2010 | 27 | 266,311 | 23.1 | 19 / 27 | 2nd | 225,708 | 33.1 | 2nd | 8 / 27 | 25 / 81 | ▼10 |
| 2012 | 27 | 151,950 | 17.3 | 10 / 27 | 3rd | 117,990 | 22.9 | 2nd | 6 / 27 | 15 / 81 | ▼10 |
| 2014 | 25 (Note: One of its candidates was elected in coalition with Koruna Česká (party).) | 118,268 | 11.5 | 7 / 27 | 3rd | 53,149 | 11.2 | 4th | 2 / 27 | 14 / 81 | ▼1 |
| 2016 | 24 (Note: Including Zdeněk Nytra who ran as independent.) | 107,785 | 12.2 | 6 / 27 | 3rd | 48,609 | 11.5 | 4th | 4 / 27 | 10 / 81 | ▼4 |
| 2018 | 19 (Note: Including Jaroslav Zeman and Jan Tecl.) | 163,630 | 15.0 | 11 / 27 | 1st | 116,736 | 27.8 | 1st | 10 / 27 | 16 / 81 | ▲6 |
| 2020 | 17 | 140,293 | 14.1 | 10 / 27 | 1st | 82,377 | 18.2 | 2nd | 5 / 27 | 18 / 81 | ▲2 |
| 2022 | 17 | 151,908 | 13.7 | 9 / 27 | 2nd | 111,071 | 23.2 | 2nd | 8 / 27 | 23 / 81 | ▲5 |
| 2024 | 16 | 125,449 | 15.8 | 9 / 27 | 2nd | 92,424 | 23.7 | 2nd | 5 / 27 | 18 / 81 | ▼5 |
| 2026 | 14 | 163,226 | 14.14 | 9 / 27 | 3rd | 104,827 | 22.15 | 3rd | 7 / 27 | 20 / 81 | ▲2 |

=== Presidential ===
==== Indirect elections ====
| Election | Candidate | First round | | | Second round | | | Third round | | |
| Election | Candidate | Votes | % | Result | Votes | % | Result | Votes | % | Result |
|---|---|---|---|---|---|---|---|---|---|---|
| 1993 | Endorsed Václav Havel | 109 | 63.4 | Won | — | | | | | |
| 1998 | Endorsed Václav Havel | 130 | 70.7 | Runner-up | 146 | 52.3 | Won | — | | |
| 2003 | Václav Klaus | 123 | 45.6 | Runner-up | 109 | 55.1 | Runner-up | 113 | 55.9 | First place |
| 2003 | Václav Klaus | 121 | 44.0 | Runner-up | 118 | 61.5 | Runner-up | 127 | 66.1 | Won |
| 2003 | Václav Klaus | 147 | 53.5 | Runner-up | 139 | 51.9 | Runner-up | 142 | 53.4 | First place |
| 2008 | Václav Klaus | 139 | 50.2 | Runner-up | 142 | 51.3 | Runner-up | 141 | 56.0 | First place |
| 2008 | Václav Klaus | 141 | 50.9 | Runner-up | 141 | 52.8 | Runner-up | 141 | 56.0 | Won |

==== Direct elections ====
| Election | Candidate | First round | | | Second round | | |
| Election | Candidate | Votes | % | Result | Votes | % | Result |
|---|---|---|---|---|---|---|---|
| 2013 | Přemysl Sobotka | 126,846 | 2.46 | Eliminated | supported Karel Schwarzenberg | | |
| 2018 | Mirek Topolánek | 221,689 | 4.30 | Eliminated | supported Jiří Drahoš | | |
| 2023 (Note: The SPOLU coalition supported 3 independent candidates for this election.) | Petr Pavel | 1,975,056 | 35.40 | Runner-up | 3,358,926 | 58.33 | Won |
| 2023 | Danuše Nerudová | 777,080 | 13.93 | Eliminated | supported Petr Pavel | | |
| 2023 | Pavel Fischer | 376,705 | 6.75 | Eliminated | supported Petr Pavel | | |

=== European Parliament ===
| Election | List leader | Votes | % | Seats | +/– | EP Group |
|---|---|---|---|---|---|---|
| 2004 | Jan Zahradil | 700,942 | 30.05 (#1) | 9 / 24 | New | EPP-ED |
| 2009 | Jan Zahradil | 741,946 | 31.45 (#1) | 9 / 22 | Steady | ECR |
| 2014 | Jan Zahradil | 116,389 | 7.68 (#6) | 2 / 21 | ▼7 | ECR |
| 2019 | Jan Zahradil | 344,885 | 14.55 (#2) | 4 / 21 | ▲2 | ECR |
| 2024 (Note: Run as party of the SPOLU coalition.) | Alexandr Vondra | 661,250 | 22.27 (#2) | 3 / 21 | ▼1 | ECR |

=== Regional councils ===
| Election | Vote | % | Seats | +/– | Position | Governors | Coalitions |
|---|---|---|---|---|---|---|---|
| 2000 | 559,301 | 23.8 | 185 / 675 | ▲185 | ▲1st | 8 / 13 | 8 / 13 |
| 2004 | 769,848 | 36.4 | 291 / 675 | ▲106 | 1st | 12 / 13 | 12 / 13 |
| 2008 | 687,005 | 23.6 | 180 / 675 | ▼111 | ▼2nd | 0 / 13 | 4 / 13 |
| 2012 | 324,081 | 12.3 | 102 / 675 | ▼78 | ▼3rd | 0 / 13 | 0 / 13 |
| 2016 | 239,836 | 9.5 | 76 / 675 | ▼26 | ▼4th | 0 / 13 | 10 / 13 |
| 2020 (Note: 53 seats and 192,946 votes which is 6.96% if counting only regions where ODS ran by itself.) | 411,825 | 14.9 | 99 / 675 | ▲23 | ▲2nd | 4 / 13 | 13 / 13 |
| 2024 (Note: 54 seats and 140,544 votes which is 5.90% if counting only regions where ODS ran by itself.) | 450,854 | 18.9 | 106 / 675 | ▲7 | 2nd | 1 / 13 | 4 / 13 |

=== Local elections ===
| Election | Vote | % | Position | Seats |
|---|---|---|---|---|
| 1994 | 3,787,264 | 29.56 | 1st | 7,289 / 62,160 |
| 1998 | 1,895,984 | 24.16 | 1st | 5,697 / 62,920 |
| 2002 | 2,036,021 | 25.21 | 1st | 5,715 / 62,494 |
| 2006 | 3,935,395 | 36.2 | 1st | 7,033 / 62,426 |
| 2010 | 1,694,396 | 18.78 | 2nd | 5,112 / 62,178 |
| 2014 | 893,065 | 9.01 | 3rd | 2,398 / 62,300 |
| 2018 | 2,465,930 | 11.1 | 2nd | 2,845 / 61,892 |
| 2022 | 12,977,999 | 12.1 | 2nd | 2,294 / 61,780 |

== Elected representatives ==
Civic Democratic Party has 23 members of the Chamber of Deputies.

- Ivan Adamec
- Jan Bauer
- Martin Baxa
- Petr Beitl
- Marek Benda
- Petr Bendl
- Stanislav Blaha
- Pavel Blažek
- Jana Černochová
- Petr Fiala
- Jakub Janda
- Martin Kupka
- Karel Krejza
- Jaroslav Martinů
- Ilona Mauritzová
- Vojtěch Munzar
- Jan Skopeček
- Zbyněk Stanjura
- Bohuslav Svoboda
- Jiří Ventruba
- Jan Zahradník
- Pavel Žáček

Civic Democratic Party has 13 Senators in the Czech Senate.

- Martin Červíček
- Tomáš Goláň
- Tomáš Jirsa
- Vladimíra Ludková
- Ladislav Med
- Jakub Navařík
- Zdeněk Nytra
- Jiří Oberfalzer
- Petr Paták
- Jarmila Smotlachová
- Zbyněk Sýkora
- Jan Tecl
- Miloš Vystrčil

Civic Democratic Party has 3 MEPs.

- Evžen Tošenovský
- Veronika Vrecionová
- Alexandr Vondra
