= Martin Palouš =

H.E. Martin Palouš
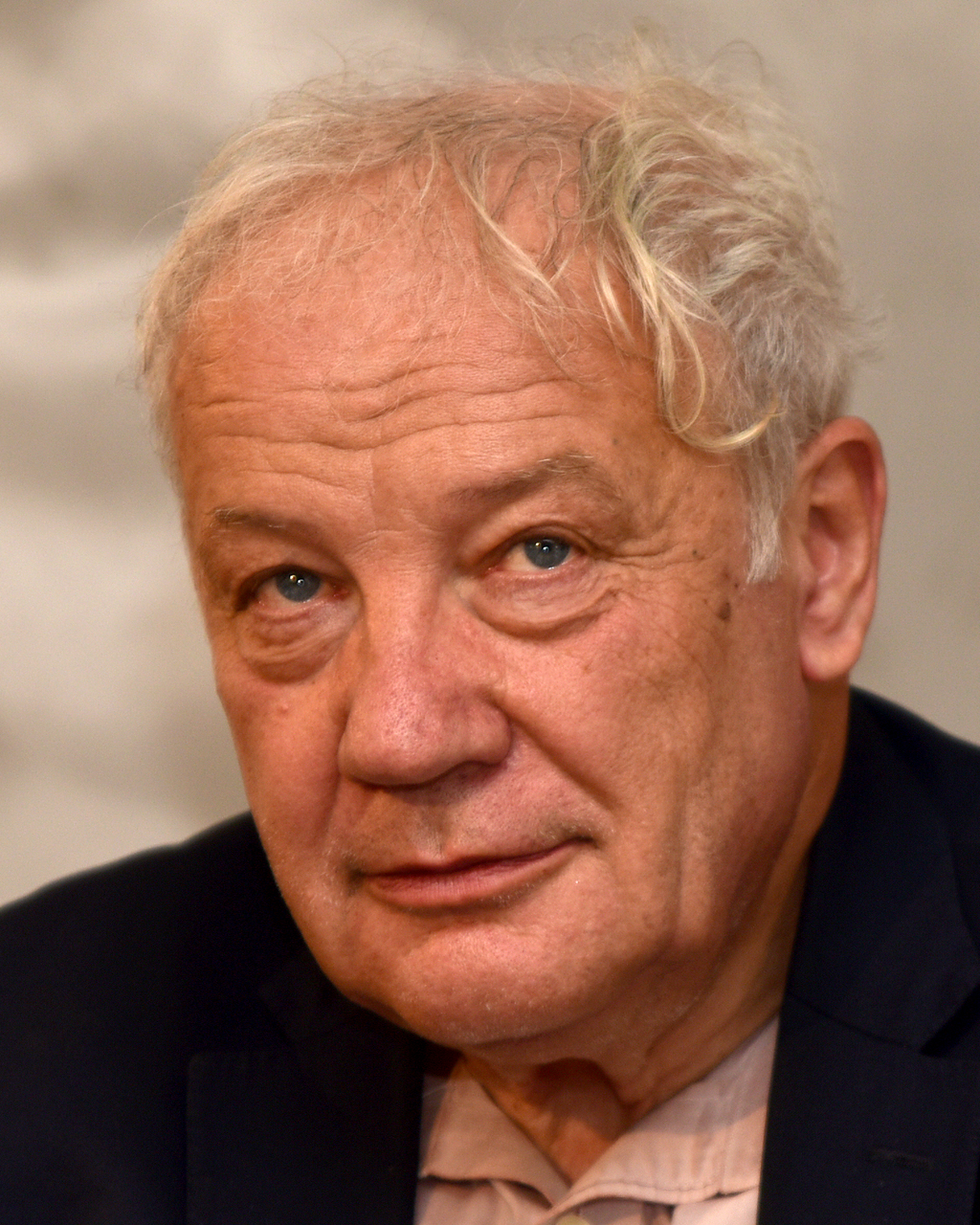
- Palouš in 2019

Permanent Representative to the UN for the Czech Republic
- In office 11 September 2006 – 2011
- Preceded by: Hynek Kmoníček
- Succeeded by: Edita Hrdá

Ambassador to the United States for the Czech Republic
- In office 2001–2005
- Preceded by: Alexandr Vondra
- Succeeded by: Petr Kolář

Personal details
- Born: 14 October 1950 (age 75) Prague, Czechoslovakia
- Spouse: Pavla Paloušová
- Children: 2

Martin Palouš (born 14 October 1950 in Prague, Czechoslovakia) is the ex-Permanent Representative to the United Nations for the Czech Republic. He presented his credentials to UN Secretary-General Kofi Annan on 11 September 2006. Palouš is married to Pavla Paloušová and they have two children.

== Education ==
Palouš has a Doctorate of Natural Sciences degree in chemistry from Charles University in Prague. He has also studied philosophy, social sciences, and law. Currently, he just finished completing his doctoral thesis in 2010 in international law at Masaryk University in Brno.

== Career ==
Palouš (right) accepts an honorary key to Miami-Dade County, presented to him by Miami-Dade Mayor Alex Penelas in November 1999

Palouš was the Czech Republic Ambassador to the United States prior to taking office at the United Nations. His other diplomatic and political appointments include the Czech Republic's Deputy Minister of Foreign Affairs, Deputy Minister of Foreign Affairs at the Ministry of Foreign Affairs of Czechoslovakia. He was also a founding member of the Civic Forum. He was elected to the Federal Assembly in 1990 and was then a member of its Foreign Affairs Committee. He unsuccessfully ran for leadership of Civic Forum but lost to Václav Klaus.

Being one of the first signers of Charter 77, he served as spokesman for the human rights group. Palouš has also had an active academic career, holding a number of teaching positions, and also lectured at Northwestern University in the United States from 1993 to 1994. Today, he lectures International Relations courses at Florida International University.

Palouš is a member of Prague Society for International Cooperation, an NGO whose main goals are networking and the development of a new generation of responsible, well-informed leaders and thinkers.

== See also ==
- List of current permanent representatives to the United Nations
