= Vodochody Airport =

Prague/Vodochody Airport Letiště Vodochody
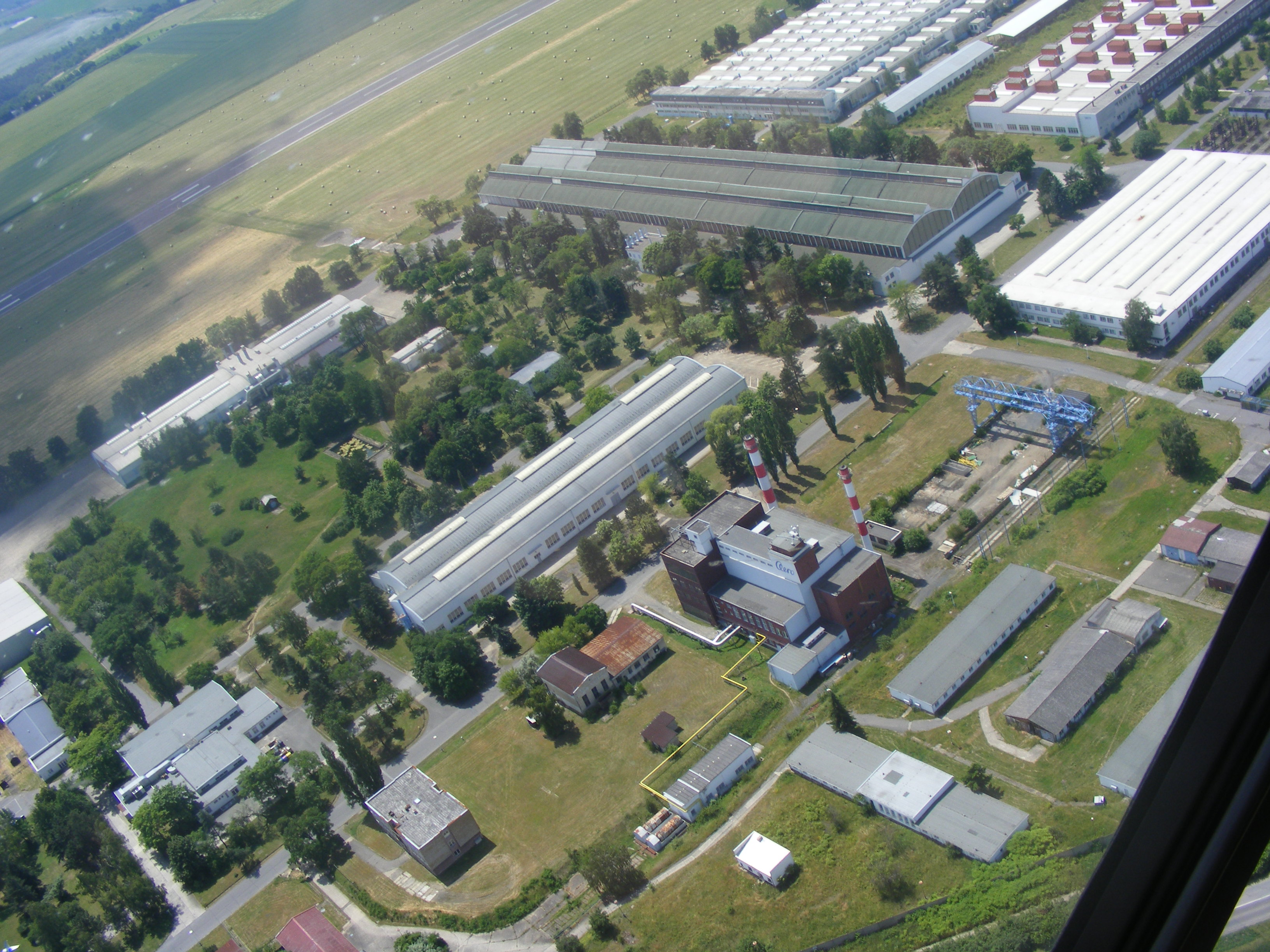
- Aero Vodochody factory with airport from the air
- IATA: VOD; ICAO: LKVO

Summary
- Airport type: Private
- Operator: Aero Vodochody
- Serves: Prague
- Location: Vodochody
- Opened: 1942
- Hub for: Aero Vodochody
- Elevation AMSL: 919 ft / 280 m
- Coordinates: 50°12′59″N 014°23′42″E
- Website: vodochody-airport.cz/en/

Map
- Location of the airport in Czech Republic

Runways
Direction	Length		Surface
Direction	m	ft	Surface
10/28	2,500	8,202	Asphaltic concrete
Emer	1,400	4,593	Dirt
- Source: Czech AIP at EUROCONTROL

Vodochody Airport (Czech: Letiště Vodochody) (IATA: VOD, ICAO: LKVO), also known as Aero Airport, is a private general aviation airport located in Vodochody in the Czech Republic. It is also the home to Aero Vodochody, a Czech aerospace company. The airport at an elevation of 919 ft/280m above sea level has an asphalt main runway 2500m long and an emergency strip 1400m long. LKVO is located 15 km North-West from the Capital of Prague.

== Services provided ==
- Operating hours: Hx / H24. This is non-specific, adaptable 24/7 by demand.
- Handling, Transport, Catering services.
- Accommodations at Clarion Congress Hotel in Prague.
- Passengers to be transferred directly from the plane to the car and vice versa.
- Passenger lounge and crew rest area at the apron.
- JET A1, Avgas 100 LL available.

== Details ==
- IFR/VFR Day&Night traffic allowed. Aerodrome Operating Minima: DH 300 ft, VIS 1000 m.
- Icao 3C aircraft category / Firefighting category 3 – Cat. 6 or higher ON REQUEST.
- Runway: 10/28 tora=2500m, toda=2560m, lda=2500m, asda=2500m.
- Tower, Approach, Radar services, Meteorology, Aro.
- The SID is not designed, expect a radar vectoring for departure.
- Training and test flights can be provided in reserved airspace up to FL660.
- Paintshop is available in the Aero factory.
