= Civic Forum =

Civic Forum Občanské fórum
- Chairman: Václav Klaus
- Founder: Václav Havel
- Founded: 19 November 1989
- Dissolved: 23 February 1991 (11 May 1992)
- Succeeded by: Civic Democratic Party; Civic Movement
- Headquarters: Prague, Czechoslovakia
- Newspaper: Občanský deník
- Ideology: Liberal democracy
- Political position: Big tent

The Civic Forum (Czech: Občanské fórum, OF) was a political movement in the Czech part of Czechoslovakia, established during the Velvet Revolution in 1989. The corresponding movement in Slovakia was called Public Against Violence (Slovak: Verejnosť proti násiliu – VPN).

The Civic Forum's purpose was to unify the dissident forces in Czechoslovakia and to overthrow the Communist regime. In this, they succeeded when the Communists gave up power in November 1989 after only 10 days of protests. Playwright Václav Havel, its leader and founder, was elected president on 29 December 1989. Although the Forum did not have a clear political strategy beyond the June 1990 elections, it campaigned successfully in March and April 1990 during the first free elections in Czechoslovakia since 1946. Those elections garnered Civic Forum 36 percent of the vote, the highest that a Czechoslovak party ever obtained in a free election. This netted it 68 seats in the Chamber of Deputies; combined with Public Against Violence's 19 seats, it commanded a strong majority.

The Civic Forum had a very loose structure, and most of its (self-appointed) leaders came from Prague-based members of the Charter 77 dissident movement. In December 1989, Jan Urban became the Forum's chairman after Havel's election as president. Urban served until June 1990, when he resigned, stating he did not want a rift between the organization and the president. On 16 October 1990, Václav Klaus was elected its new chairman. Klaus's policies were opposed by other leading figures within the Forum and party unity soon vanished.

At the Civic Forum congress in January 1991, the movement divided. The more right wing members, led by Klaus, declared that they would form an independent party, the Civic Democratic Party (Občanská demokratická strana), with a clearer program advocating a free market. The party elected Klaus as its chairman in February 1991. The more centrist members of Civic Forum, led by federal minister of foreign affairs Jiří Dienstbier, formed the Civic Movement (Občanské hnutí). Klaus stated that the two parties would rule as a coalition until the 1992 elections. However, by July 1991 Klaus declared the inter-party cooperation over. The Civic Democratic Party was victorious in the elections of 1992 while the Civic Movement failed to reach the 5% threshold to enter parliament and eventually disappeared.

== Ideologic platforms ==
- Interparliamentary Club of the Democratic Right - rightist wing in the party. It was led by Václav Klaus. It transformed into the Civic Democratic Party.
- Liberal Club of the Civic Forum - centrist wing of the party. Opposition to Klaus. It transformed into Civic Movement
- Social Democratic Club of Civic Forum - Social democratic wing led by Rudolf Battěk. It became Association of Social Democrats.

== Election results ==
=== Federal Assembly ===
==== House of the People ====
Year	Vote	Vote %	Seats	Place	Position
1990	3,851,172	36,2	68 / 150	1st	Majority Government

==== House of Nations ====
Year	Vote	Vote %	Seats	Places	Position
1990	3,613,513	34,0	50 / 150	1st	Majority Government

=== Czech National Council ===
Year	Vote	Vote %	Seats	Place	Cabinet
1990	3,569,201	49,50	124 / 200	1st	Pithart I, Pithart II
