= Líbeznice =

- Municipality
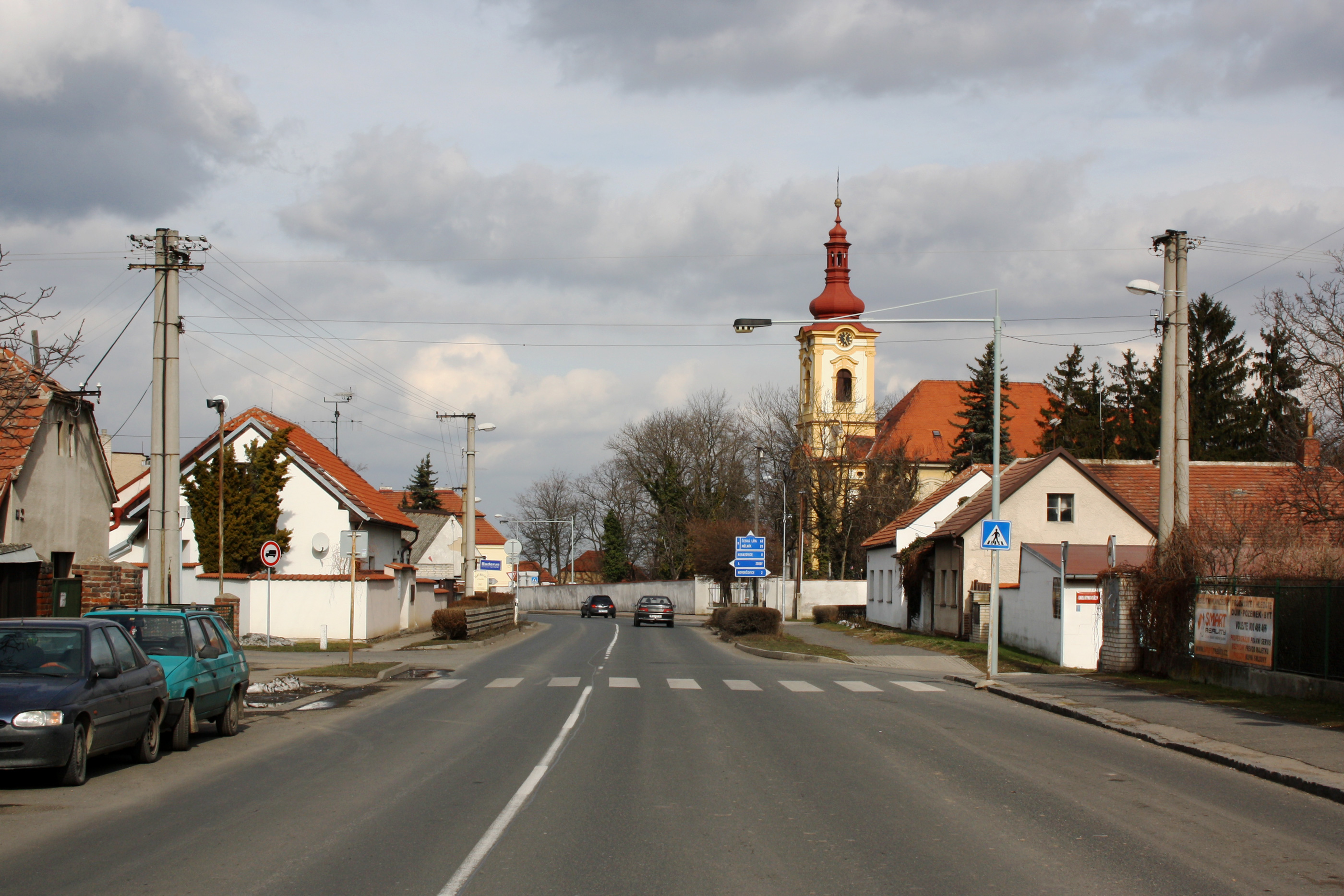
- Mělnická street

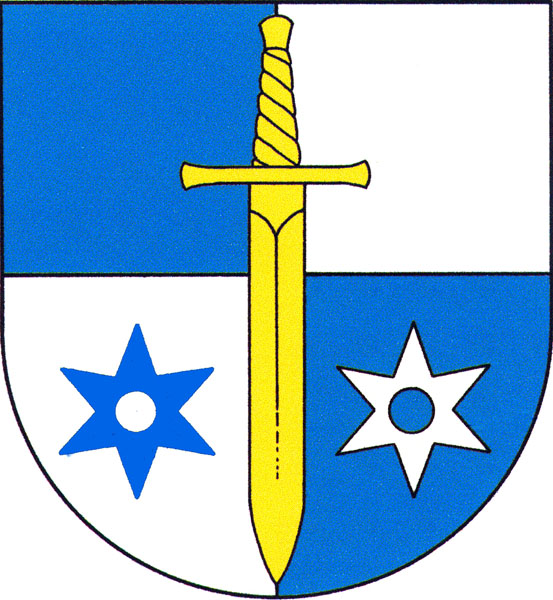
- Flag Coat of arms

- Location in the Czech Republic
- Coordinates: 50°11′31″N 14°29′37″E
- Country: Czech Republic
- Region: Central Bohemian
- District: Prague-East
- First mentioned: 1236

Area
  - Total: 5.99 km^{2} (2.31 sq mi)
- Elevation: 203 m (666 ft)

Population (2026-01-01)
  - Total: 3,303
  - Density: 551/km^{2} (1,430/sq mi)
- Time zone: UTC+1 (CET)
  - Summer (DST): UTC+2 (CEST)
- Postal code: 250 65
- Website: www.libeznice.cz

Líbeznice (Czech pronunciation: [ˈliːbɛzɲɪtsɛ]) is a municipality and village in Prague-East District in the Central Bohemian Region of the Czech Republic. It has about 3,300 inhabitants.

== Etymology ==
The name is derived from the surname Líbezný, meaning "the village of Líbezný's people". The word líbezný, from which the surname arose, means 'lovely' in Czech.

== Geography ==
Líbeznice is located about 9 kilometres (6 mi) north of Prague. It lies in a flat agricultural landscape in the Central Elbe Table. The highest point is at 229 m (751 ft) above sea level.

== History ==
The first written mention of Líbeznice is in a document from 1236 issued by King Wenceslaus I. In 1294, the village was divided between the Vyšehrad Chapter and Metropolitan Chapter at Saint Vitus in Prague, which lasted for more than 100 years. Among the next notable owners of Líbeznice was King George of Poděbrady and Old Town of Prague. From 1652 until the establishment of a sovereign municipality in 1848 (with a short break in the 1660s), the village was a property of the Nostitz family.

== Demographics ==
Historical population

Year	Pop.	±%
1869	1,061	—
1880	1,318	+24.2%
1890	1,302	−1.2%
1900	1,228	−5.7%
1910	1,197	−2.5%

Year	Pop.	±%
1921	1,120	−6.4%
1930	1,388	+23.9%
1950	1,256	−9.5%
1961	1,339	+6.6%
1970	1,304	−2.6%

Year	Pop.	±%
1980	1,246	−4.4%
1991	1,200	−3.7%
2001	1,316	+9.7%
2011	2,207	+67.7%
2021	3,214	+45.6%

Source: Censuses

== Transport ==
The I/9 road (which connects the D8 motorway with Česká Lípa and the Czech–German border) runs through the municipality.

== Education ==
In the municipality is a primary school.

== Sights ==
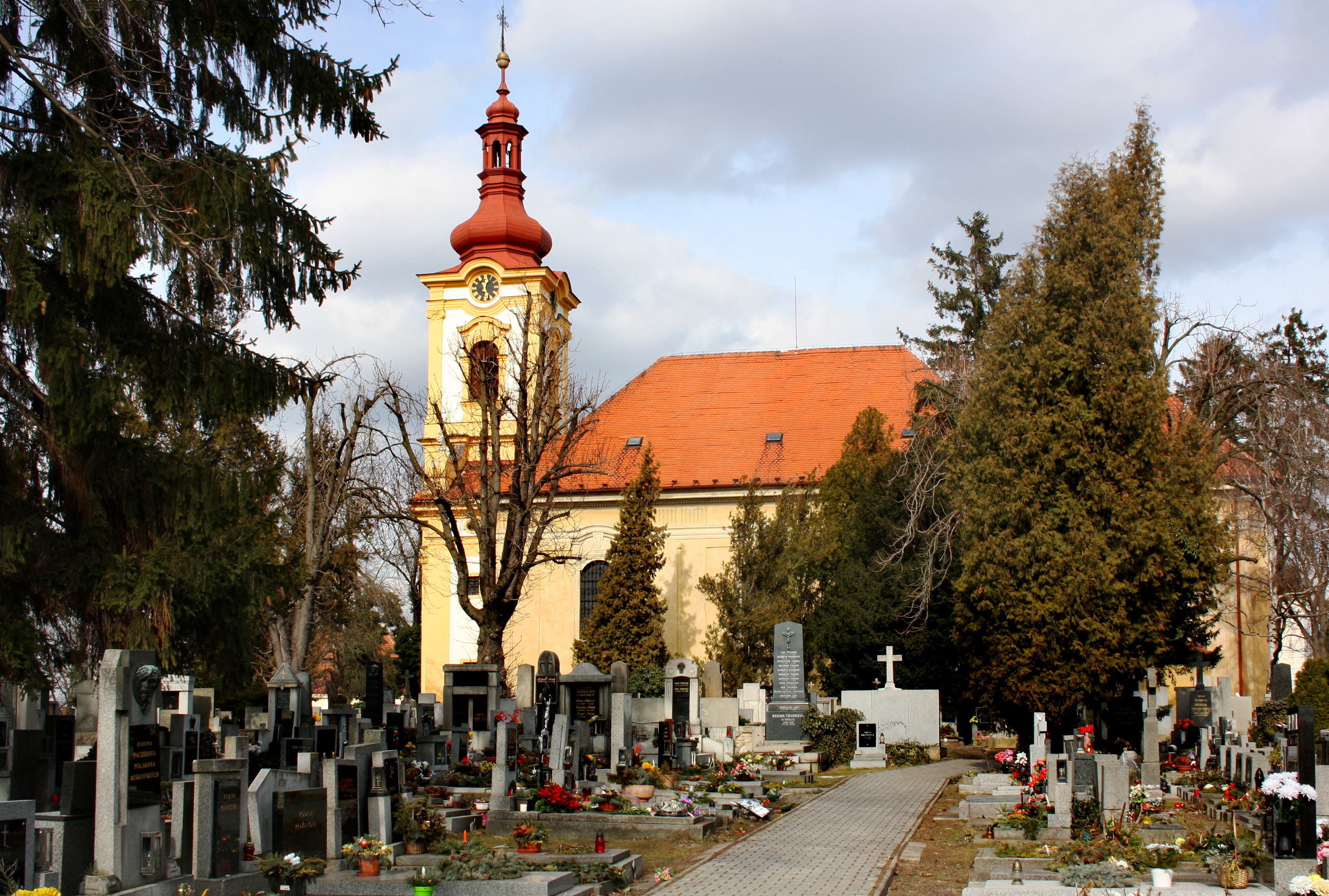
Church of Saint Martin

The main landmark of Líbeznice is the Church of Saint Martin. It was built in the late Baroque style in 1788–1795.

== Notable people ==
- Ondřej Hutník (born 1983), kickboxer
