= Jiří Ventruba =

Czech politician (1950–2021)

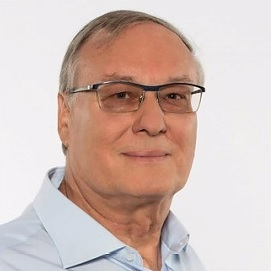
Jiří Ventruba, 2017

Jiří Ventruba (2 February 1950 – 9 March 2021) was a Czech neurosurgeon and politician.

== Biography ==
He was born in Brno, Czechoslovakia. He was a member of the Chamber of Deputies of the Czech Republic from 2017 until his death on 9 March 2021, in Prague from COVID-19 during the COVID-19 pandemic in Czech Republic.
