= Ministry of Transport (Czech Republic) =

Government ministry of the Czech Republic

Ministry of Transport Czech Republic
- Ministerstvo dopravy České republiky

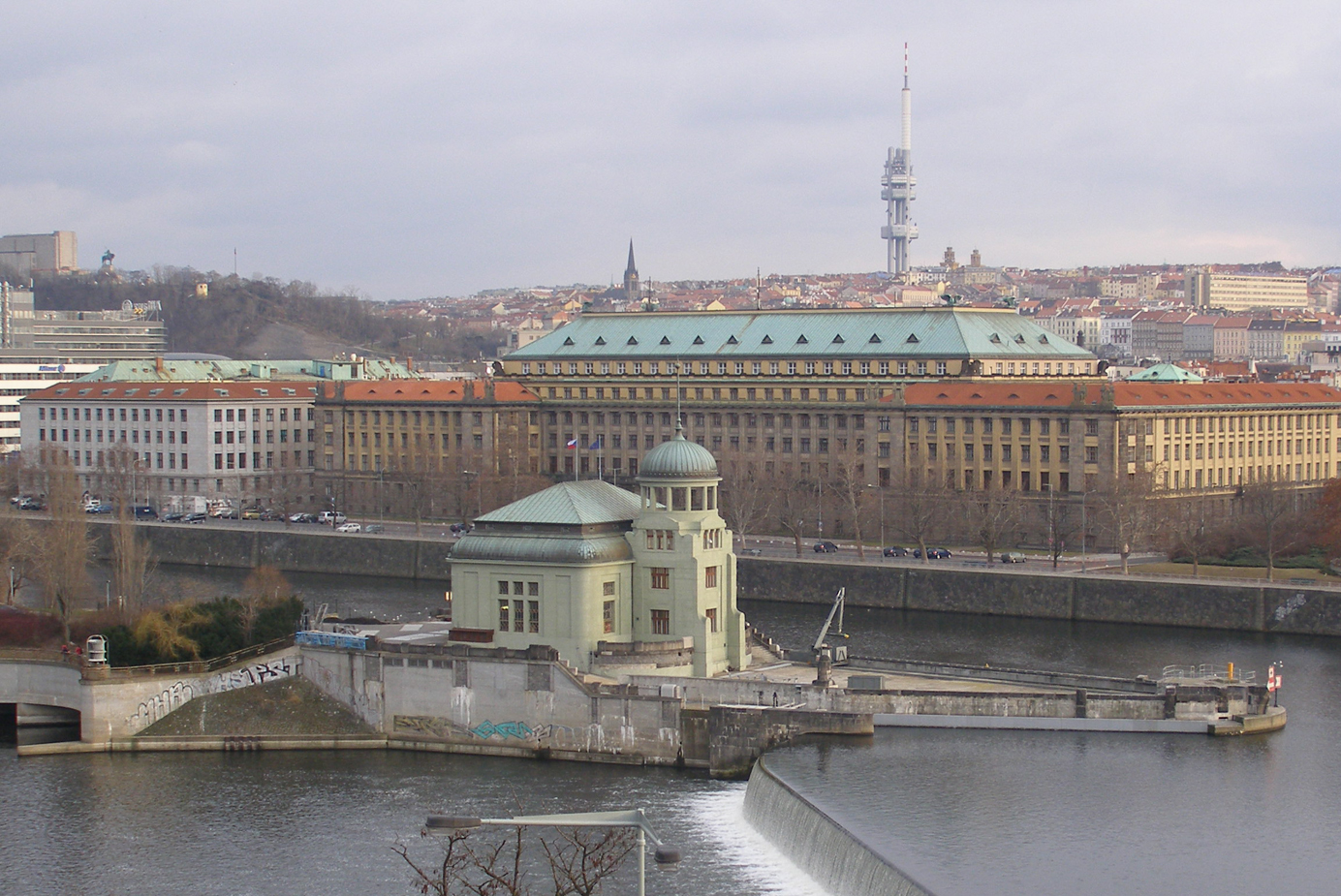
- Ministry of Transport (background)

Agency overview
- Formed: 1969
- Headquarters: Nábřeží Ludvíka Svobody 12/1222, 110 15 Prague 1 (New Town); 50°5′36.07″N 14°26′3.72″E
- Agency executive: Ivan Bednárik, Minister of Transport
- Website: md.gov.cz

The Ministry of Transport of the Czech Republic (Czech: Ministerstvo dopravy České republiky) is a government ministry, which was established in 1969.

Its head office is in Prague 1, in New Town.
