= Edita Hrdá =

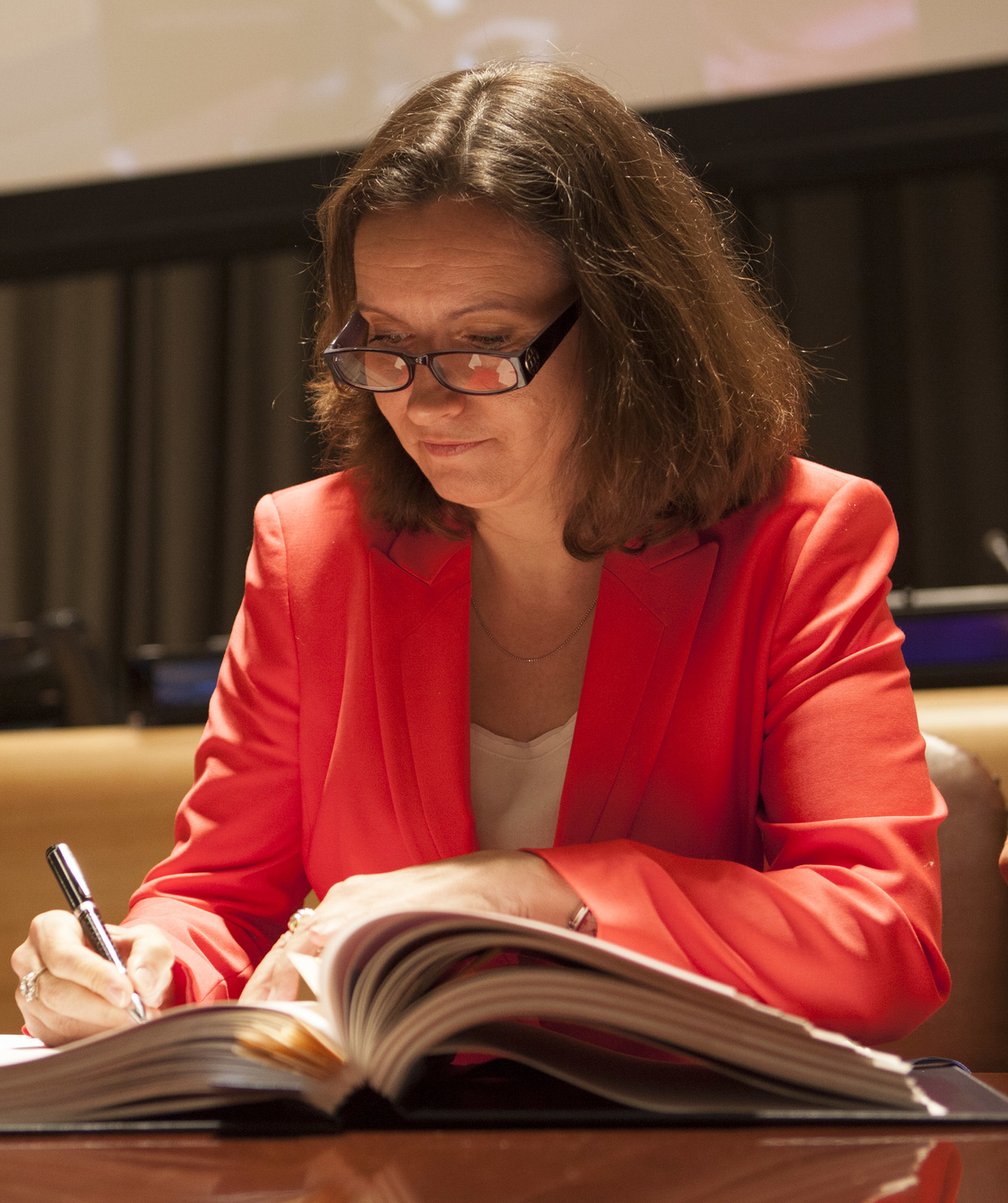
- Edita Hrdá in 2013

Ambassador of the Czech Republic to the United Nations in New York
- In office 2011–2015
- Preceded by: Martin Palouš
- Succeeded by: Marie Chatardová

9th permanent representative of the Czech Republic to the European Union
- Incumbent
- Assumed office 1 October 2020
- Preceded by: Jakub Dürr

Personal details
- Born: 30 December 1963 (age 62) Prague, Czechoslovakia
- Education: Prague University of Economics and Business
- Profession: Diplomat

Edita Hrdá (born 30 December 1963) is a Czech diplomat, Senior Director of the European External Action Service for the Americas from 2015 to 2020 and a permanent representative of the Czech Republic to the European Union from 2020.

== Biography ==
Hrdá graduated from the Faculty of International Relations of the University of Economics in Prague in 1986. Subsequently, she worked as a translator and an interpreter of German and Spanish languages. She studied in a diplomatic academy, initially in Madrid, then in Vienna, from 1991.

From 2011 to 2015, she served as a permanent representative of the Czech Republic to the United Nations. In October 2020, she became the permanent representative of the Czech Republic to the European Union, thus replacing Jakub Dürr in the position.
