= Young Conservatives (Czech Republic) =

Youth wing of the Civic Democratic Party

Young Conservatives Mladí konzervativci
- Chairman: David Vančík
- 1st Vice Chairman: Jan Hroudný
- Founded: 8 December 1991
- Headquarters: 17. listopadu 1126/43, Olomouc
- Membership: 700
- Ideology: Conservatism; Economic liberalism Liberal conservatism Euroscepticism
- Colours
- Mother party: Civic Democratic Party
- National affiliation: Civic Democratic Party
- International affiliation: International Young Democrat Union (IYDU)
- European affiliation: European Young Conservatives (EYC); European Democrat Students (EDS); Democrat Youth Community of Europe (DEMYC)
- Website: www.konzervativci.cz

The Young Conservatives (Czech: Mladí konzervativci, MK CZ) is a right-wing political youth organisation in the Czech Republic. It is the youth wing of the centre-right Civic Democratic Party (ODS), and shares that party's conservative and economical liberal ideology.

MK is open to young people within the ages of 15 to 35. The current chair of the Young Conservatives is David Vančík, since 2019.

== History ==
The founding congress was held on 8 December 1991, following preparations through the Charter of Young Conservatives by a group of students at the Brno University of Technology and the "Všehrd" Law Students' Association at the Faculty of Law of Charles University in Prague. David Částek was elected as first leader of the Young Conservatives.

Notable ODS politicians who started as members of Young Conservatives include Jan Zahradil, Jiří Pospíšil, Petr Sokol, Martin Baxa, Petr Gandalovič, Ivan Langer, Martin Novotný, and Pavel Drobil. Former Young Conservatives leader Petr Mach went on to found the Party of Free Citizens.

== Ideology ==
The original ideological course of the Young Conservatives was set out in the Charter of Young Conservatives, following basic conservative principles: democracy, nationhood, rule of law, liberty, free market, tradition, private ownership, family, and morality. Through its history, the Young Conservatives have closely cooperated with the Civic Democratic Party (ODS). The organization defines its approach towards the European Union as "Eurorealistic" or Euroskeptic.

== Leaders ==
	Name	Years
1st	David Částek	1991 – 1993
2nd	Michal Špaňár	1993 – 1997
3rd	Petr Mach	1997
4th	David Rýc	1997 – 2001
5th	Petr Sokol	2001 – 2007
6th	Jiří Klindera	2007 – 2008
7th	Jiří Fremr	2008 – 2017
8th	Milan Vyskočil	2017 – 2019
9th	David Vančík	2019 –

== International Affiliation ==
- European Young Conservatives
- European Democrat Students
- International Young Democrat Union
- Democrat Youth Community of Europe
