= Civic Movement =

Civic Movement Občanské hnutí
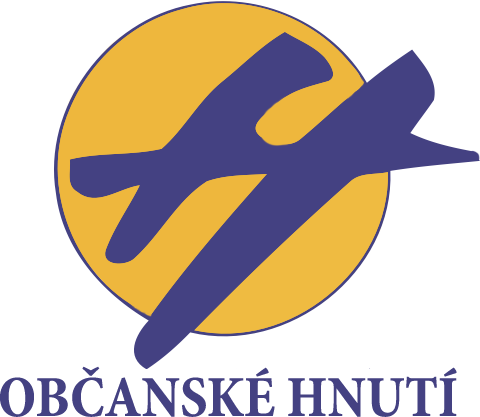
- Leader: Jiří Dienstbier
- Founded: 27 April 1991
- Dissolved: December 1995
- Preceded by: Civic Forum
- Merged into: Free Democrats – Liberal National Social Party
- Ideology: Liberalism; Social liberalism
- Political position: Centre to centre-left
- European affiliation: ELDR (affiliate)
- International affiliation: Liberal International

The Civic Movement (Czech: Občanské hnutí, OH) was a liberal political party based in the Czech Republic, which existed from 1991 to 1995. The party was established after the break-up of Civic Forum by the social liberal left wing of Civic Forum, while the conservative wing established the Civic Democratic Party. Foreign Minister Jiří Dienstbier was elected leader of the Civic Movement. The party participated in the 1992 legislative election but failed to reach the required 5% threshold and was left without parliamentary representation.

The party then renamed itself as the Free Democrats (Svobodní demokraté, SD), modelled on the Free Democratic Party of Germany, as the party tried to position itself as a more clearcut liberal party. The party joined the Liberal International and was admitted as an affiliate to the European Liberal Democrats and Reformists (ELDR) in 1994.

In December 1995 the Free Democrats merged with the Liberal National Social Party (successor to the former bloc party Czechoslovak Socialist Party) and formed the Free Democrats – Liberal National Social Party (SD-LSNS), which was again, however, unsuccessful in the 1996 legislative election. Some former members of OH established the Party for the Open Society in 1998.

== Election results ==
=== Chamber of Deputies ===
Year	Vote	Vote %	Seats	Place	Notes	Position
1990	...	...	44 / 200	1st	Split from Civic Forum in 1991	Majority Government
1992	297,406	4.6	0 / 200	9th		extra-parliamentary
1996	124,165	2.05	0 / 200	9th	as Free Democrats – Liberal National Social Party	extra-parliamentary
