= Senate district 20 – Prague 4 =

Electoral district in the Czech Republic

Coordinates: 50°02′25″N 14°26′50″E

20 – Prague 4
- inline Senate district of the Czech Republic

- The Prague-4 district on a map
- Senator: Jiří Drahoš; Mayors and Independents
- Region: Capital City of Prague
- District: Prague
- Electorate: 89458
- Area: 21.1 km²
- Last election: 2024
- Next election: 2030

Senate district 20 – Prague 4 is an electoral district of the Senate of the Czech Republic, which is entirely located in the Capital City of Prague. Since 2018, former presidential candidate and former president of the Czech Academy of Sciences, Jiří Drahoš has been a senator for the district.

== Senators ==
Year	Senator	Party
1996 (Note: Election for shortened four-year term)	Zdeněk Klausner	ODS
2000	Josef Zieleniec	4KOALICE
2004	František Příhoda	ODS
2006	Tomáš Töpfer	ODS
2012	Eva Syková	ČSSD
2018	Jiří Drahoš	STAN
2024	Jiří Drahoš	STAN

== Election results ==
=== 1996 ===
1996 Czech Senate election in Prague 4
Candidate	Party	1st round		2nd round	
Candidate	Party	Votes	%	Votes	%
Zdeněk Klausner	ODS	22 505	48,63	21 791	53,80
Dagmar Burešová	KDU-ČSL	9 924	21,44	18 710	46,20
Vladimír Kočandrle	ČSSD	9 199	19,88	—	—
Petr Zajíček	KSČM	2 750	5,94	—	—
Petr Čunderlík	NEZ	700	1,51	—	—
Richard Nemčok	NEI	540	1,17	—	—
Přemysl Vachalovský	PB	443	0,96	—	—
Vavřinec Bodenlos	ČSNS	220	0,48	—	—

=== 2000 ===
2000 Czech Senate election in Prague 4
Candidate	Party	1st round	
Candidate	Party	Votes	%
Josef Zieleniec	4KOALICE	17 591	52,11
Zdeněk Klausner	ODS	8 794	26,05
Miroslav Prokeš	KSČM	3 565	10,56
Světlana Navarová	ČSSD	3 149	9,32
Rudolf Mazáč	PB	656	1,94

=== 2004 ===
2004 Czech Senate by-election in Prague 4
Candidate	Party	1st round		2nd round	
Candidate	Party	Votes	%	Votes	%
František Příhoda	ODS	6 663	37,82	8 078	60,12
Erazim Kohák	ČSSD	3 547	20,13	5 358	39,87
Tomáš Ježek	"LIRA"	2 859	16,22	—	—
Jan Vávra	ED	2 176	12,35	—	—
Karel Skoupil	KSČM	2 023	11,48	—	—
Vladimír Němec	SZR	251	1,42	—	—
Petr Švec	NSJ	97	0,55	—	—

=== 2006 ===
2006 Czech Senate election in Prague 4
Candidate	Party	1st round		2nd round	
Candidate	Party	Votes	%	Votes	%
Tomáš Töpfer	ODS	20 143	49,61	18 669	73,07
Richard Hindls	ČSSD	7 204	17,74	6 877	26,92
Václav Krása	KDU-ČSL	5 919	14,57	—	—
Petr Štěpánek	SZ	4 432	10,91	—	—
Karel Skoupil	KSČM	2 903	7,15	—	—

=== 2012 ===
2012 Czech Senate election in Prague 4
Candidate	Party	1st round		2nd round	
Candidate	Party	Votes	%	Votes	%
Eva Syková	ČSSD	7 055	24,72	12 243	52,50
Tomáš Töpfer	ODS	6 756	23,67	11 076	47,49
Petr Štěpánek	SZ, KDU-ČSL	6 492	22,75	—	—
Karel Skoupil	KSČM	3 196	11,20	—	—
Ladislav Kunert	TOP 09, STAN	2 438	8,54	—	—
Jan Nádvorník	Svobodní	1 241	4,34	—	—
Miloslav Kramný	Sovereignty	799	2,80	—	—
Karel Kolář	PP	386	1,35	—	—
Jaromír Novotný	NÁR.SOC.	168	0,58	—	—

=== 2018 ===
2018 Czech Senate election in Prague 4
Candidate	Party	1st round	
Candidate	Party	Votes	%
Jiří Drahoš	STAN, KDU-ČSL, TOP 09, Greens	20 595	52,65
Eva Syková	ANO 2011	5 110	13,06
Martin Dvořák	ODS	4 868	12,44
Miroslava Skovajsová	ČSSD	3 058	7,81
Benjamin Miloslav Kuras	REAL	2 801	7,16
Jiří Kocman	SPD	1 251	3,19
Karel Skoupil	KSČM	1 169	2,98
Rudolf Karel Mazáč	Enough is enough!	258	0,65

=== 2024 ===
2024 Czech Senate election in Prague 4
Candidate	Party	1st round		2nd round	
Candidate	Party	Votes	%	Votes	%
Jiří Drahoš	STAN, KDU-ČSL, TOP 09, ODS, Pirates	12 130	48,21	11 896	74,26
Josef Svoboda	ANO 2011	4 267	16,96	4 123	25,73
Petr Štěpánek	Greens	3 690	14,66	—	—
Markéta Šichtařová	Svobodní	3 532	14,04	—	—
Filip Outrata	SOCDEM	689	2,73	—	—
Pavel Sehnal	APB	546	2,17	—	—
Vladimíra Vítová	ANS	216	0,85	—	—
Jiří Folajtár	JaSaN	86	0,34	—	—
