= Arnika (NGO) =

Czech environmental non-governmental organization

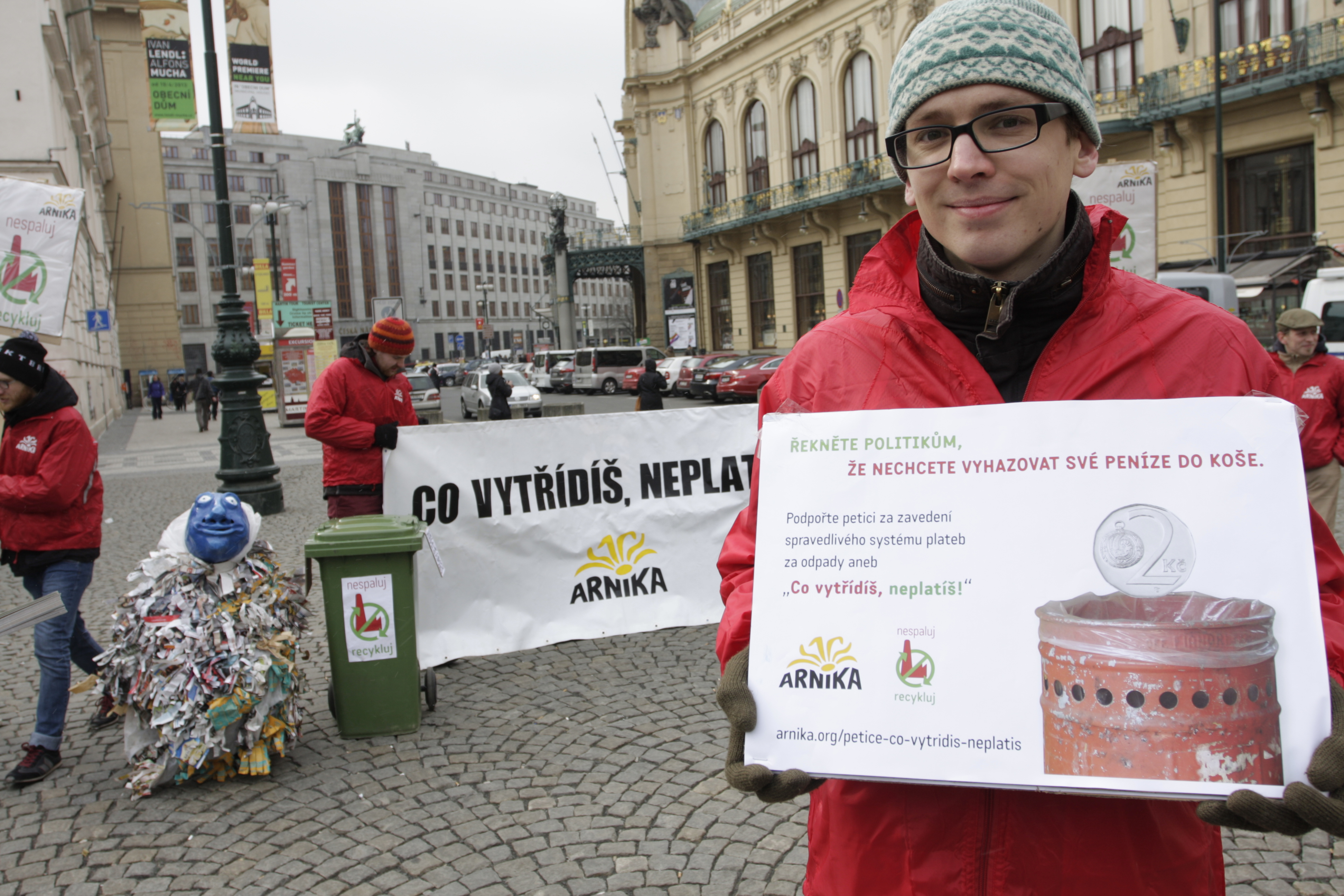
- Petition activity 'You don't pay for what you separate' in Prague, 2013
- Founded: 29 September 2001
- Type: Non-governmental organization
- Purpose: public participation, biodiversity protection, and eliminating toxic substances and waste
- Location: Prague, Czech Republic
- Region served: Global
- Method: advocacy, research, direct action
- Website: arnika.org/en/

Arnika is a Czech non-governmental organization (NGO) established on 29 September 2001, and officially registered as a civic association. It focuses on public participation, biodiversity protection, and eliminating toxic substances and waste.

Engaging in national and international networks, Arnika collaborated with entities like the International Pollutants Elimination Network, International Rivers, European Rivers Network, European Environmental Bureau, and European ECO Forum. At the national level, Arnika associated with Green Circle, Climate Coalition, Czech Forum for Development Cooperation, and DEMAS. It also collaborated with Wageningen University and the University of Ostrava.

== Programs and focus ==
Arnika's activities encompass a range of environmental issues, including river protection, biodiversity protection, urban environment, waste reduction, recycling and the elimination of persistent organic pollutants (POPs). The organization is recognized as a consumer protection entity. As of 2022, Arnika operates through two main programs: the Center for Citizen Support and the Toxics and Waste Programme. There was also a Nature Conservation Programme in Arnika previously.

The work of the Toxics and Waste Programme encompassed controversies related to various waste incinerators, with a specific emphasis on waste incineration residues, especially concerning dioxins in fly ash.

== History ==
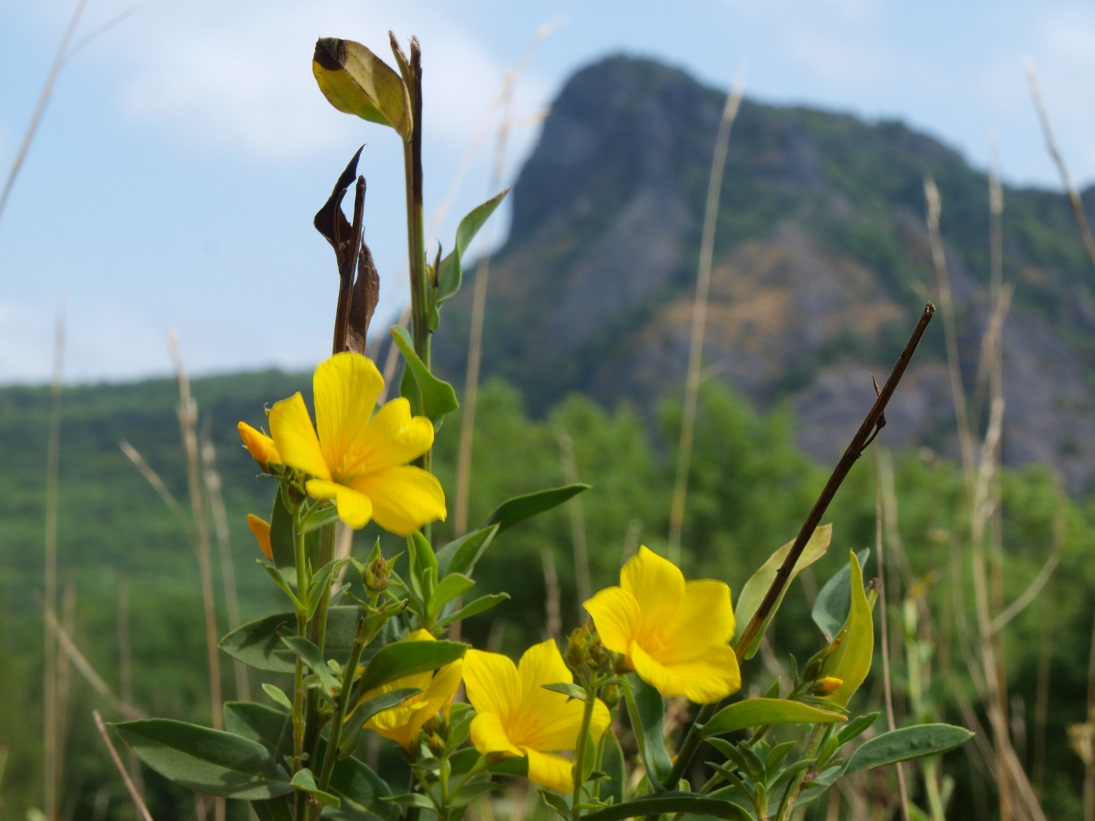
A yellow flax, an endangered species, was relocated before being buried under the Radovesická výsypka (a disposal site for waste soil).

Arnika, founded on 29 September 2001, by environmentalists Jindřich Petrlík, Martin Skalský, Vlastimil Karlík, and Lenka Mašková, originated after their departure from the Czech NGO Děti Země. Subsequently, Petrlik, Skalsky, and Karlík assumed leadership as chairmen of Arnika. Notably, Team Bořena, established in 1979, joined Arnika in 2001. The team relocated endangered plant species from an area with waste soil from an open-pit brown coal mine in the 1980s.

=== Toxic chemicals, waste, and plastics ===
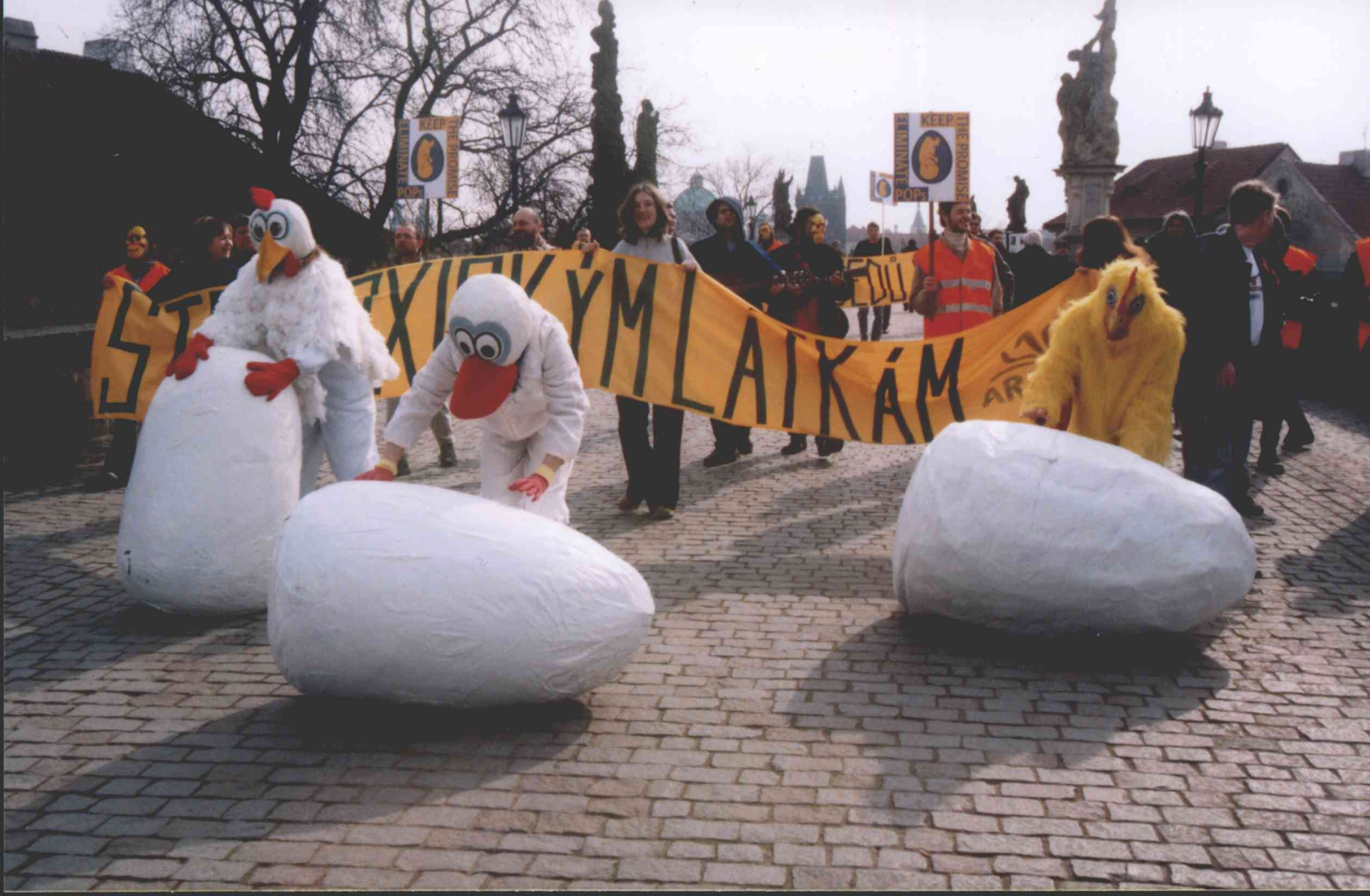
Arnika's happening associated with the submission of the petition 'For a Toxics Free Future' to the Parliament of the Czech Republic in March 2005.

Arnika led the Toxics-Free Future campaign between 2001-2004, contributing to the establishment of a Pollutant Release and Transfer Register (PRTR) in the Czech Republic and the ratification of the Stockholm Convention. Since 2005, Arnika has been compiling rankings of industrial sources emitting various substances, encouraging emission reduction efforts. Arnika also addressed sites contaminated with toxic chemicals, particularly focusing on the chlorine chemical plant Spolana Neratovice post the 2002 floods.

=== Nature protection ===
Since its establishment in 2001, Arnika has consistently opposed the construction of new dams on the Elbe near Děčín, emphasizing the protection of ecosystems in Natura 2000 species sites and the preservation of migratory fish, such as salmon. In 2005, the organization filed a complaint with the European Commission, leading to a warning about the Czech government's insufficient designation of Special Protection Areas (SPA). In 2015, Arnika joined the European network for the protection of tree avenues and collaborated with the University of Ostrava on a LIFE project to expand the habitat for the endangered hermit beetle within the Natura 2000 network since 2017.

=== Public participation and urban planning ===
Arnika raised concern over Prague potentially losing its UNESCO World Heritage status and pushed for restricting the height of buildings planned by developers on the Pankrác Plain in 2008. In the years 2012–2019, Arnika heavily criticized the Metropolitan Plan for Prague, opposing market-driven changes to the city's land-use plan. The focus of collaborative efforts with Wageningen University in 2008 was Urban water management in Prague.

=== Jan Skalický ===
In 2019, Jan Skalický, the former head of the Directorate of Waterways, accused Arnika of being financially supported by competing railway carriers. Jan Hodovský, author of the Environmental Impact Assessment (EIA) documentation on dams on the Elbe in 2011, made similar claims about Arnika's funding from German railways. Arnika demanded an apology from Hodovský, who later modified his statement, acknowledging that environmentalists were financed from the state budget of Germany at that time.

== International activity ==
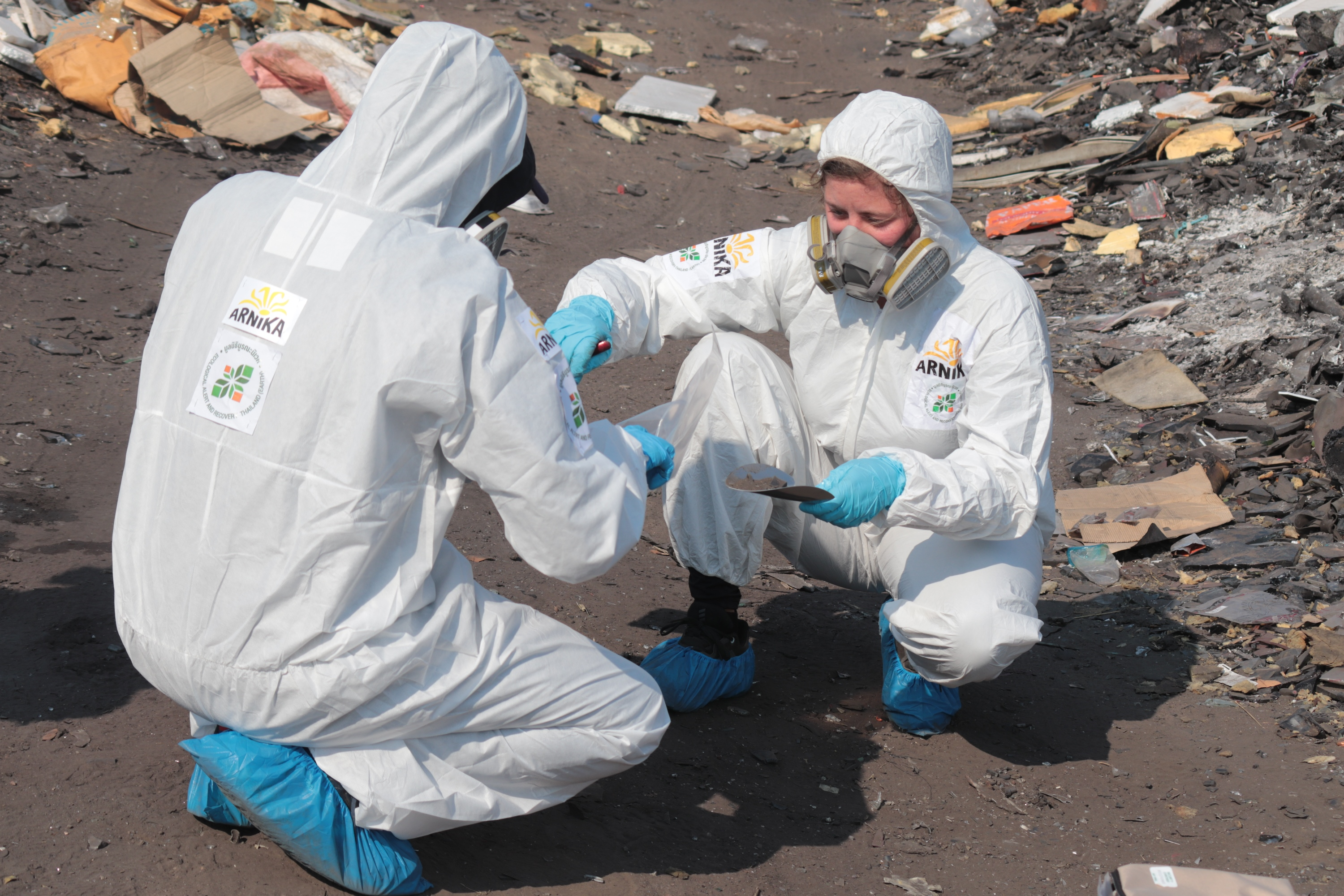
Arnika and EARTH took samples at an e-waste dumpsite in Kalasin Province, Thailand, in February 2022.

Arnika, expanding its environmental endeavors beyond the Czech Republic, has engaged in projects across Africa, Central and Southeast Asia, and Central and Eastern Europe. In collaboration with IPEN and the Basel Action Network, Arnika highlighted dioxin contamination at an e-waste site in Agbogbloshie in 2019.

Conducting studies on global toxic pollution from plastics recycled from e-waste, Arnika collaborated with IPEN. Arnika's Toxics and Waste Programme acts as the Regional Hub for Central, Eastern & Western Europe for the International Pollutants Elimination Network, and it was the sole member of the Health Care Without Harm network in the Czech Republic, in 2018.

In 2018, the organization organized an international conference in Ostrava, focusing on combatting air pollution, recognized within the Aarhus Convention framework. Since 2018, Arnika has also been addressing air pollution issues in Ukraine.
