= Jindřich Petrlík =

Czech environmentalist

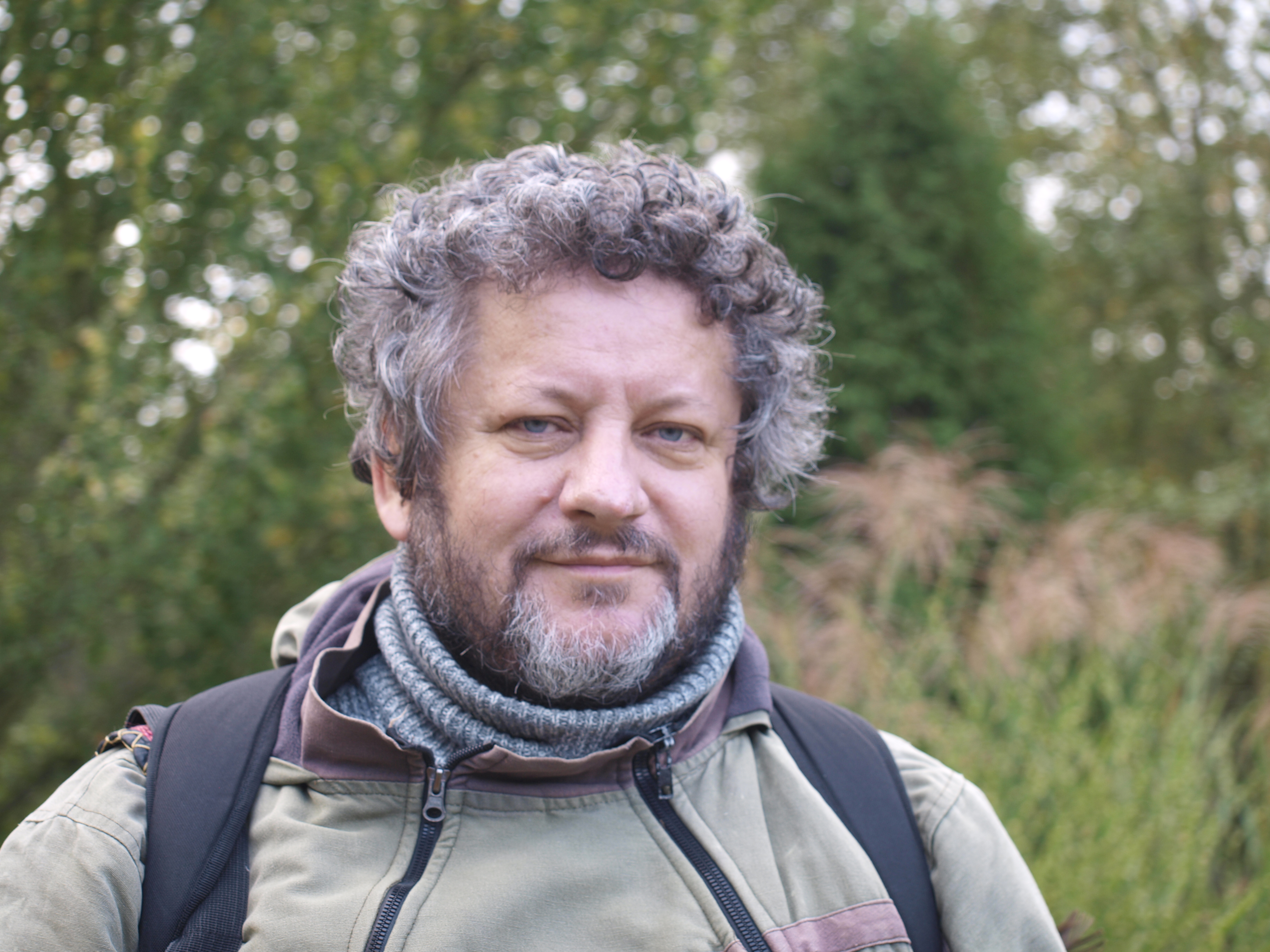
Jindřich Petrlík in 2014

Jindřich Petrlík (born 19 November 1961 Teplice) is a Czech scientist and environmentalist. He is a co-founder and board member of the Czech NGO Arnika, program manager of its Toxics and Waste Programme.

== Life ==
Petrlík was born on 19 November 1961 Teplice, Czechoslovakia. He grew up in Bílina. He studied physical geography at the Faculty of Natural sciences of the Masaryk University in Brno.

== Activity in the civil society organizations ==
In 1979 he founded civil society initiative called Team Bořena, an informal association of students focused on archaeology, history and environmental protection. In September 1989, he founded Děti Země (Children of the Earth) with a group of other activists in Prague as an independent civic initiative for the environmental protection. On 29 September 2001, together with five other former members of the Children of the Earth, he laid the foundations of the new NGO Arnika.

He chaired Děti Země in 1993–2001 and Arnika in 2004–2007 and 2011–2018.

== Professional career ==
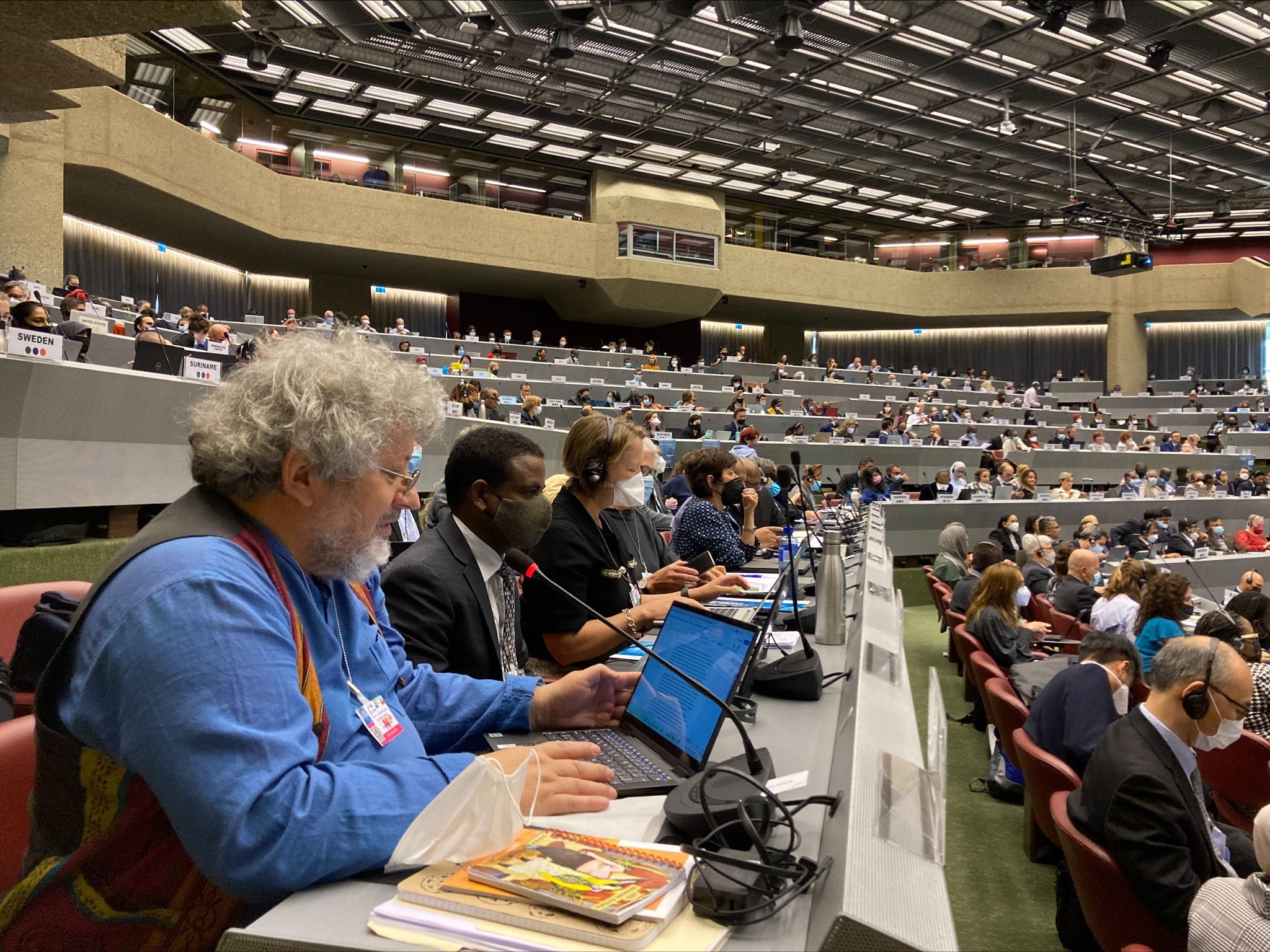
Petrlík presenting IPEN's view on POPs waste at Conference of Parties to the Stockholm Convention in 2022

Before anchoring in the non-profit sector he worked as a scientist, civil servant and journalist. In 2004, he became the director of the Arnika - Toxics and Waste Programme.

In the Arnika Association and the IPEN network, he focused on the monitoring of dioxins and other persistent organic pollutants and the assessment of environmental contamination by these substances in exposed locations. He also tracked brominated flame retardants and dioxins in toys and other consumer goods.

=== International activities ===
He is in the leadership of IPEN's working group for dioxin, PCB and waste since 2001. In 2005, he began to represent IPEN in the Stockholm Convention's expert group for the assessment of the best available technologies (BAT/BEP Expert Group) and from 2015 also in the "Small Intersessional Working Group" for the issue of waste containing persistent organic substances of the Basel Convention. He was also involved in the preparation of the Minamata Convention (on mercury) best available technology documents.
