= Children of the earth =

Children of the earth and similar phrases may refer to:

- Torchwood: Children of Earth, the third installment of the British science fiction series Torchwood
  - Torchwood: Children of Earth (soundtrack)
- Children of This Earth, a 1930 novel
- Earth's Children, a series of historical fiction novels by Jean M. Auel
- Děti Země, also known as Children of the Earth (COE), a Czech non-governmental organization
- Jerusalem cricket, a North American insect with a name in Spanish that translates as "child of the earth"
