= 2004 Czech Senate by-elections =

By-elections for Prague 4 and Znojmo District Senate seats were held in the Czech Republic in October 2004. Elections were held after incumbent senators became members of European parliament.

== Prague 4 ==
2004 Czech senate by-election
- 8–18 October
- Turnout: First Round: 20.0% Second Round: 15.2%

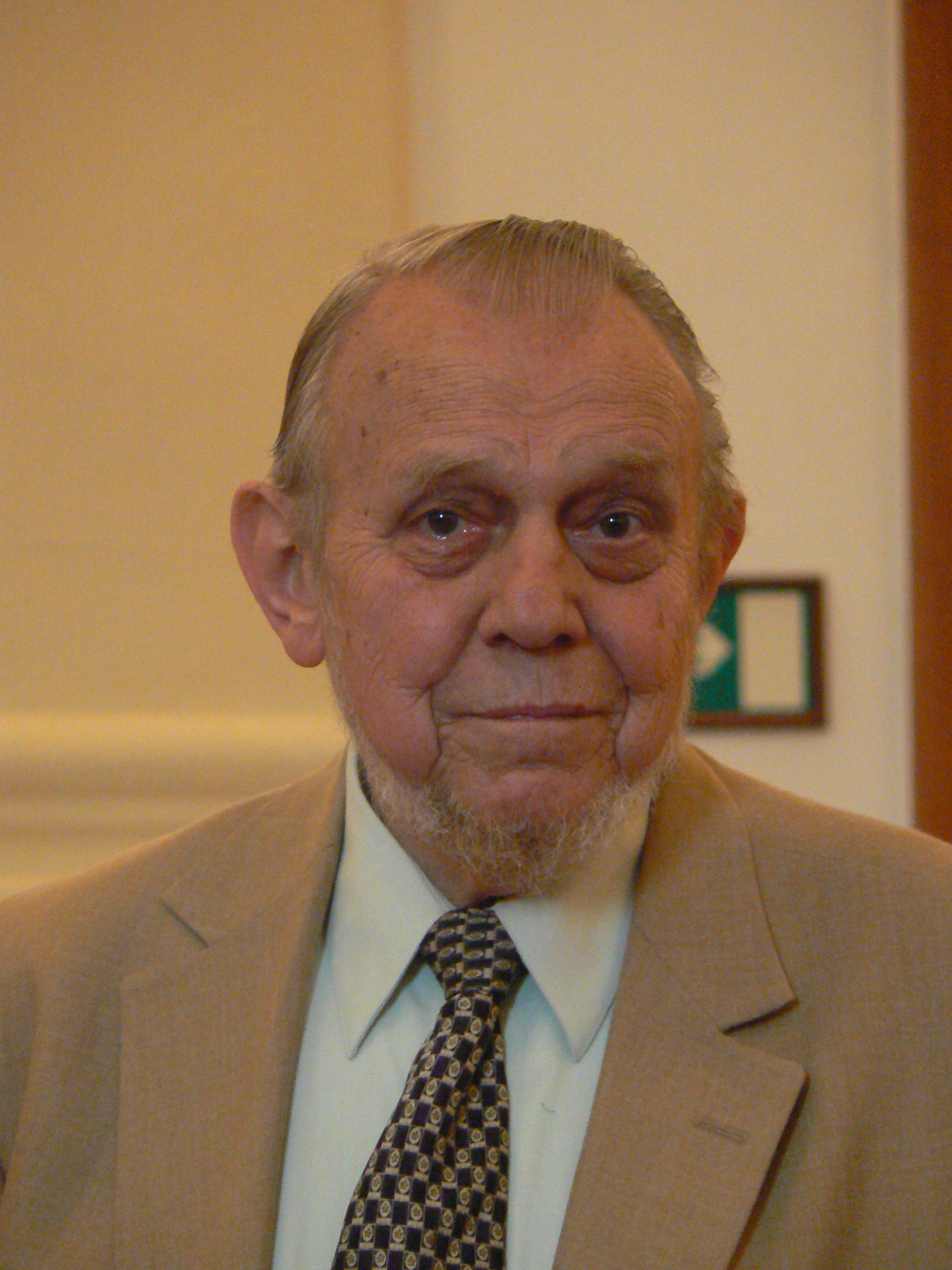
	First party	Second party
Candidate	František Příhoda	Erazim Kohák
Party	ODS	ČSSD
Popular vote	8,078	5,358
Percentage	60.1%	39.9%

Election in Prague 4 was won by František Příhoda who defeated Erazim Kohák by landslide. Příhoda's victory was generally expected.

Candidate	Party	First round		Second round	
Candidate	Party	Votes	%	Votes	%
František Příhoda	Civic Democratic Party	6,663	37.82	8,078	60.12
Erazim Kohák	Czech Social Democratic Party	3,547	20.13	5,358	39.87
Tomáš Ježek	Liberal Reform Party	2,859	16.22		
Jan Vávra	SNK European Democrats	2,176	12.35		
Karel Skoupil	Communist Party of Bohemia and Moravia	2,023	11.48		
Vladimír Němec	Party of Common Sense	251	1.42		
Petr Švec	National Unity	97	0.55		
Overall		17,738	100	13,491	100

== Znojmo ==
2004 Czech senate by-election
- 8–18 October
- Turnout: First Round: 19.5% Second Round: 14.0%

	First party	Second party
Candidate	Milan Špaček	Jaroslav Pařík
Party	Christian and Democratic Union – Czechoslovak People's Party	ODS
Popular vote	6,734	5,896
Percentage	53.3%	46.7%

Znojmo election was unexpectedly won by Milan Špaček. He faced Jaroslav Pařík who was considered front-runner due to his results in the first round.

Candidate	Party	First round		Second round	
Candidate	Party	Votes	%	Votes	%
Milan Špaček	Christian and Democratic Union – Czechoslovak People's Party	4,995	28.37	6,734	53.31
Jaroslav Pařík	Civic Democratic Party	5,161	29.32	5,896	46.68
Augustin Forman	Communist Party of Bohemia and Moravia	4,735	26.90		
Jindřich Laky	Czech Social Democratic Party	1,656	9.40		
Anna Gigimovová	Freedom Union – Democratic Union	1,054	5.98		
Overall		17,680	100	12,630	100
