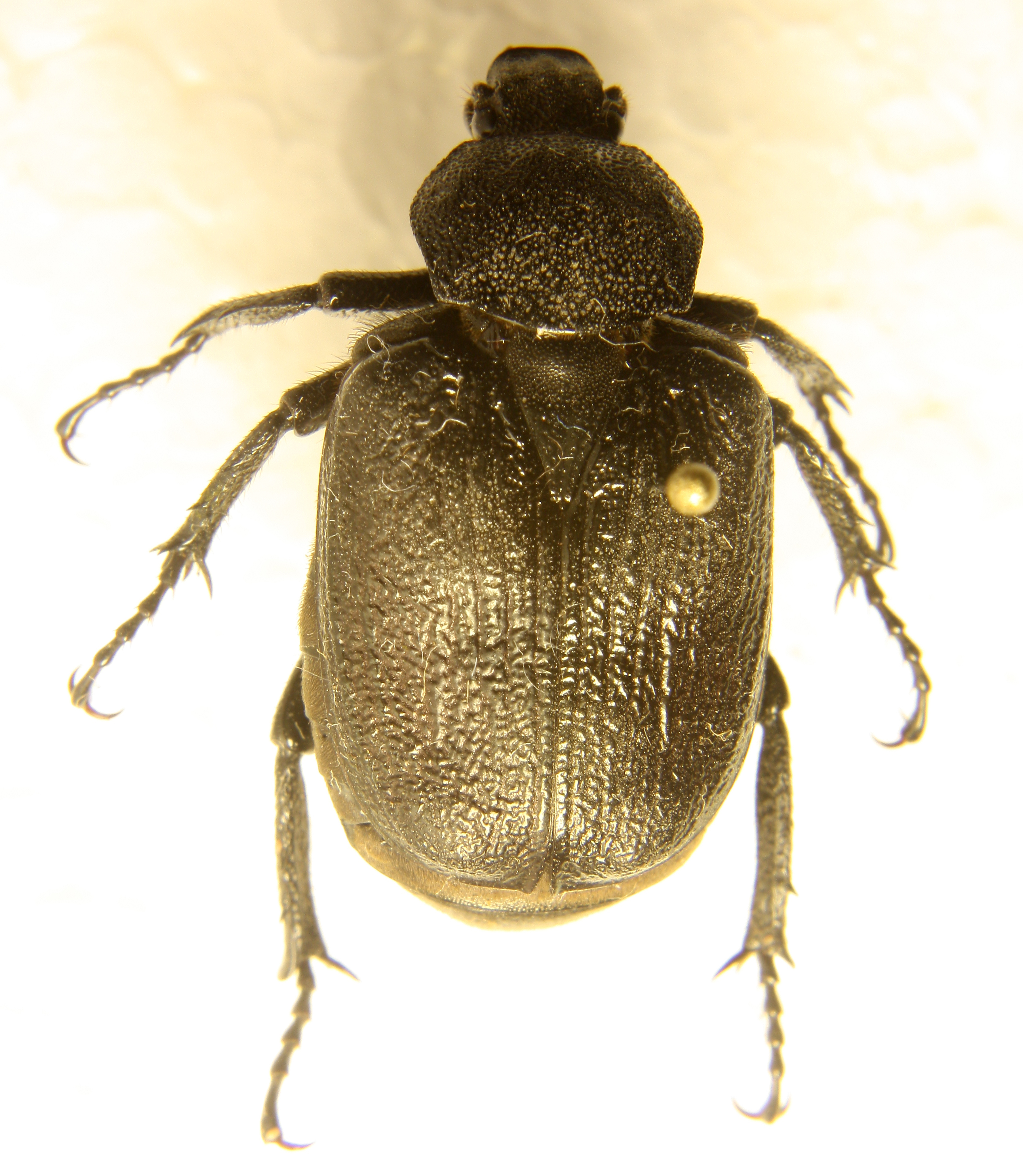

Scientific classification
- Domain: Eukaryota
- Kingdom: Animalia
- Phylum: Arthropoda
- Class: Insecta
- Order: Coleoptera
- Suborder: Polyphaga
- Infraorder: Scarabaeiformia
- Family: Scarabaeidae
- Genus: Osmoderma
- Species: O. scabrum

Binomial name
- Osmoderma scabrum (Palisot de Beauvois, 1805)

Synonyms
- Osmoderma beauvoisii Kirby, 1837; Osmoderma caviceps Kirby, 1837; Osmoderma delicatula Bainbridge, 1841; Osmoderma gracilipes Casey, 1915; Osmoderma lacustrina Casey, 1915; Trichius foveatus Casey, 1915; Trichius rugosus Casey, 1915

= Osmoderma scabrum =

Species of beetle

Osmoderma scabrum, or the rough hermit beetle, is a species in the family Scarabaeidae ("scarab beetles"), in the order Coleoptera ("beetles"). Occurring in eastern North America from Quebec south to Tennessee, it is 14-20 mm long and black, sometimes with a metallic sheen. Adults are nocturnally active and may be found at sap flows or under bark.

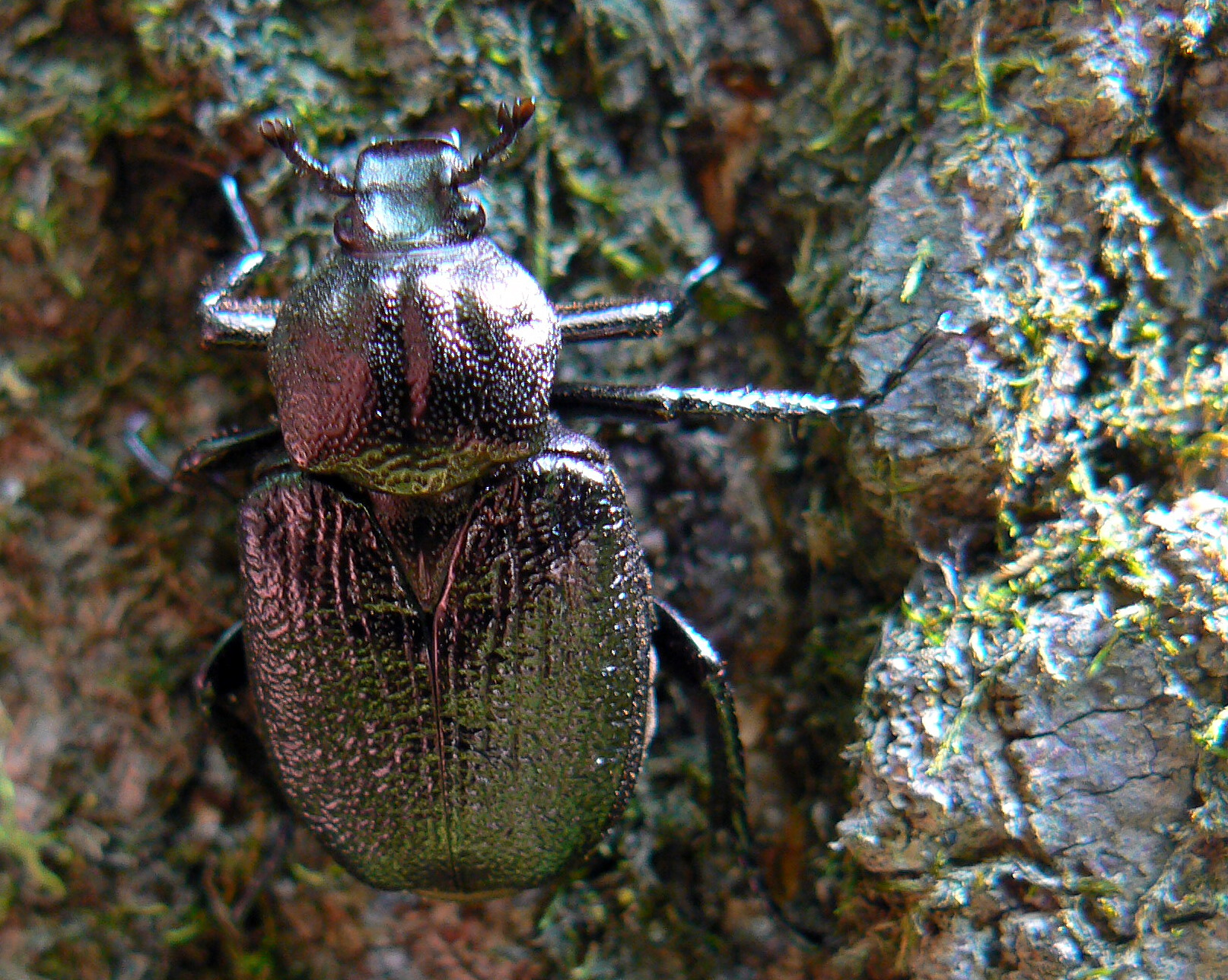
