= Martin Skalský =

Environmentalist

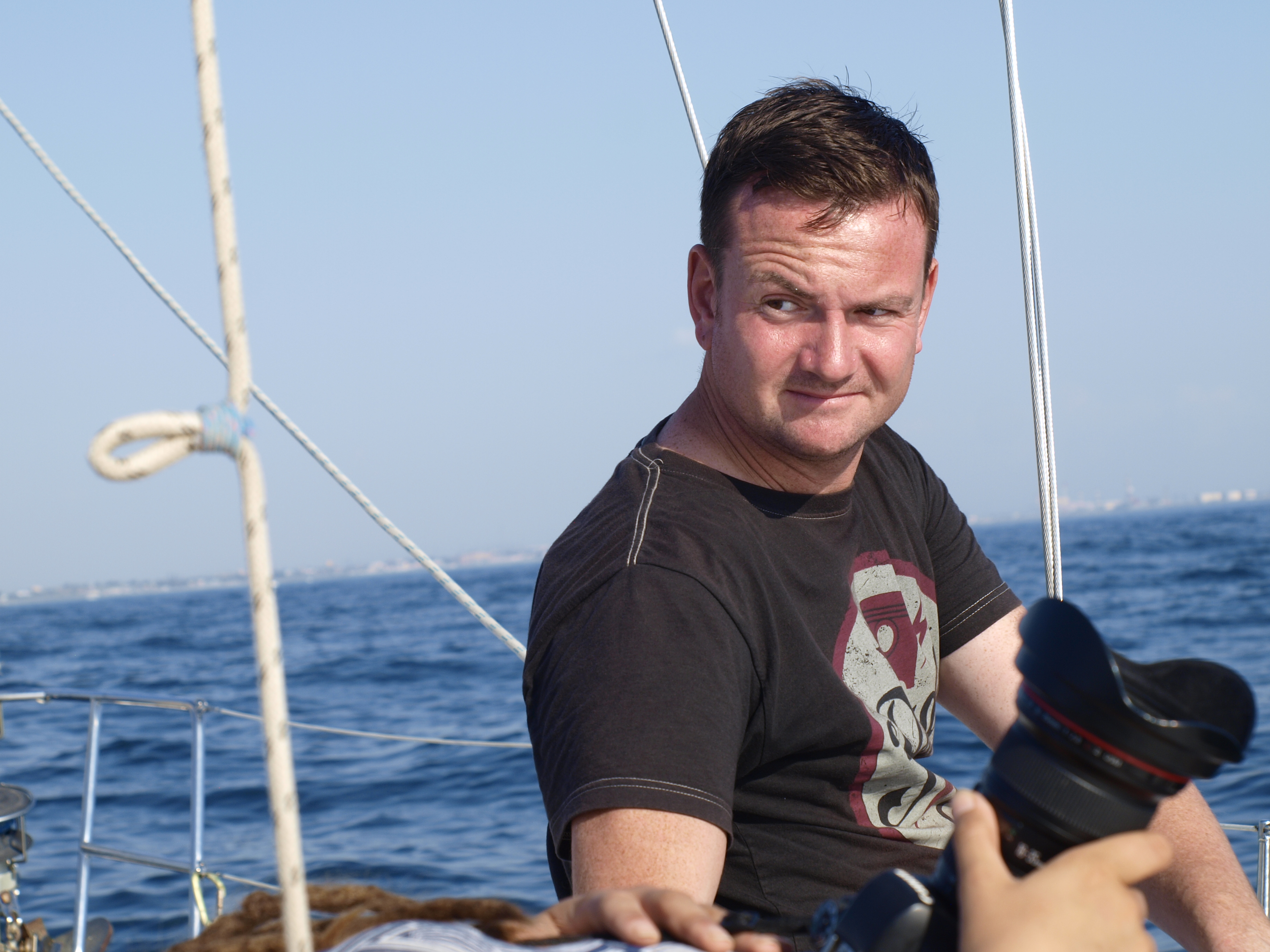
Martin Skalský on a research mission in Mangystau Region, Kazakhstan in 2016

Martin Skalský (born 9 April 1977) is a Czech environmentalist and documentarian. He is a co-founder and chairman of the Czech NGO Arnika, head of its Center for Citizen Support programme. He also worked in other civil society organizations.

== Life ==
He was born in 1977 in Prague and has lived in Prague 6 since 1983. Since 1993, he has been involved in environmental protection and worked in non-governmental organizations. He explained why he did so at the age of sixteen in an interview for Czech Radio.

== Activity in civil society organizations ==
In the years 1998–2003, in the cultural and social association Dobročinný spolek Medáků in Střešovice, he strove to save the historic enclave of old Střešovice in Prague 6. The association achieved the declaration of old Střešovice an urban monument zone. In 2001, he became one of co-founders of new environmental non-governmental organization Arnika. From 2007 to June 2013, he was a member of the executive board of the AutoMat association. In the years 2018–2023 he was the chairman of Arnika.

=== International activities ===
In 2003, he completed a long-term internship as a consultant for public participation in decision-making for the international CEE Bankwatch Network in Azerbaijan,. where he focused mainly on mapping the problems associated with the planned Baku-Tbilisi-Ceyhan oil pipeline, and wrote the script for documentary film Zdroj ("Source") in cooperation with Martin Mareček.

Since 2004, he has also participated in international projects of the Arnika. He has represented non-governmental organizations at the Aarhus Convention meetings since 2014.
