= Zdroj =

- Directed by: Martin Mareček
- Written by: Martin Mareček, Martin Skalský
- Produced by: Barbora Fabiánová, Vratislav Slajer
- Cinematography: Jiří Málek
- Distributed by: Bionaut Films
- Release date: April 29, 2005
- Running time: 77 min
- Languages: Czech, Azerbaijani

Zdroj (Source) is a 2005 Czech documentary directed by Martin Mareček and written by Martin Mareček and Martin Skalský. The film explores the civil rights abuses by the Ilham Aliyev regime of Azerbaijan during the construction of the Baku–Tbilisi–Ceyhan pipeline, such as eminent domain violations in appropriating land for the pipeline's route, and criticism of the government leading to arrest.

Zdroj won the Audience Award for the best film, the Special Jury Award and twenty international awards at the International Human Rights Documentary Film Festival One World.
