= Yuyun Ismawati =

Indonesian environmental engineer (born 1964)

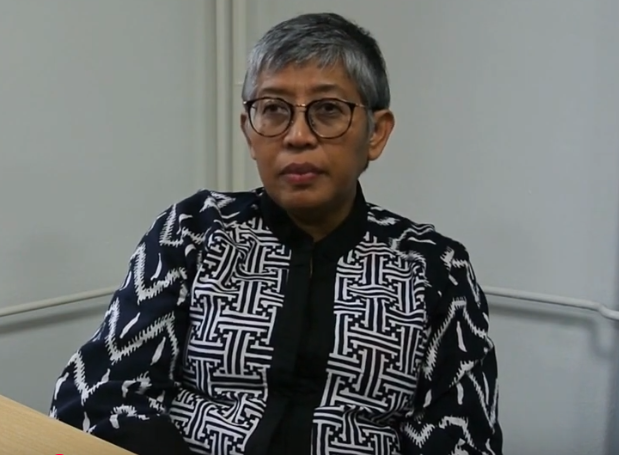
- Ismawati in 2022
- Born: 1964 (age 61–62)
- Occupation: Environmental engineer
- Awards: Goldman Environmental Prize (2009)

Yuyun Ismawati (born 1964) is an Indonesian environmental engineer. She has worked on design of city and rural water supply systems, and later on designing systems for safe waste management. She was awarded the Goldman Environmental Prize in 2009.

She is a co-founder and Senior Advisor of the Nexus3 Foundation, the leading Indonesian public interest organization working to protect people, especially vulnerable populations, from the impacts of development on public health and the environment and towards a future of justice and toxics-free, sustainable living. Yuyun has broad and rich experience in urban environmental management issues, environmental health and sanitation, as well as climate and toxics issues.

She is co-chair of the International Pollutants Elimination Network.
