= Mariann Lloyd-Smith =

Australian environmentalist

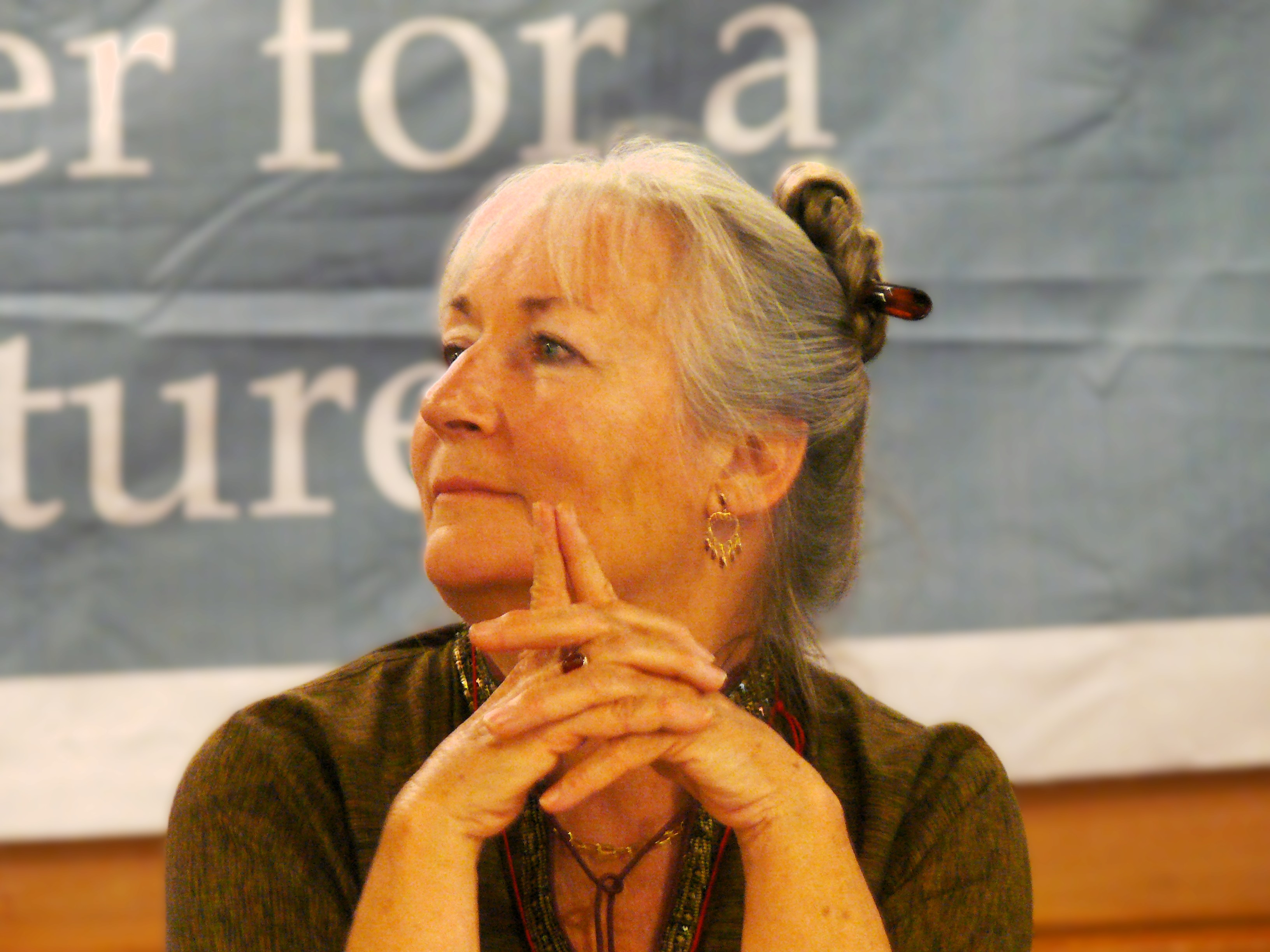
Mariann Lloyd-Smith at IPEN meeting in 2008.

Mariann Lloyd-Smith is an Australian scientist and environmentalist known for her work on chemical safety and waste management. She is a founder of the National Toxics Network (NTN) and has worked extensively with international organizations, including the International Pollutants Elimination Network (IPEN), to address toxic pollution and its impact on communities.

== Life ==
Lloyd-Smith's background includes legal training, and she obtained a PhD from the University of Technology Sydney (UTS) Law Faculty. Her father was in the military and spent the later years of his career dismantling World War II chemical warfare stockpiles in the Pacific. In the early 1990s, she moved with her partner to Canberra and co-founded the National Toxics Network (NTN).

== Activity in civil society organizations ==
Lloyd-Smith has been actively involved in chemical policy and environmental advocacy for over three decades. As a senior advisor to both IPEN and NTN, she has contributed to policy discussions on hazardous waste, persistent organic pollutants (POPs), and chemical safety regulations. Her work includes supporting communities affected by industrial pollution and chemical contamination. She has also played a role in the establishment of Australia's National Pollutant Inventory, aimed at improving public access to information about chemical emissions. She is also a co-author of the study Toxic Disputes and the Rise of Environmental Justice in Australia, which examines environmental justice movements in the country. In 2011, she has also contributed to assessments of toxic pollution incidents, such as the Orica chemical leak in New South Wales, Australia, as an adviser to the federal Labor government's National Chemicals Notifications and Assessment Scheme.

== International activities ==
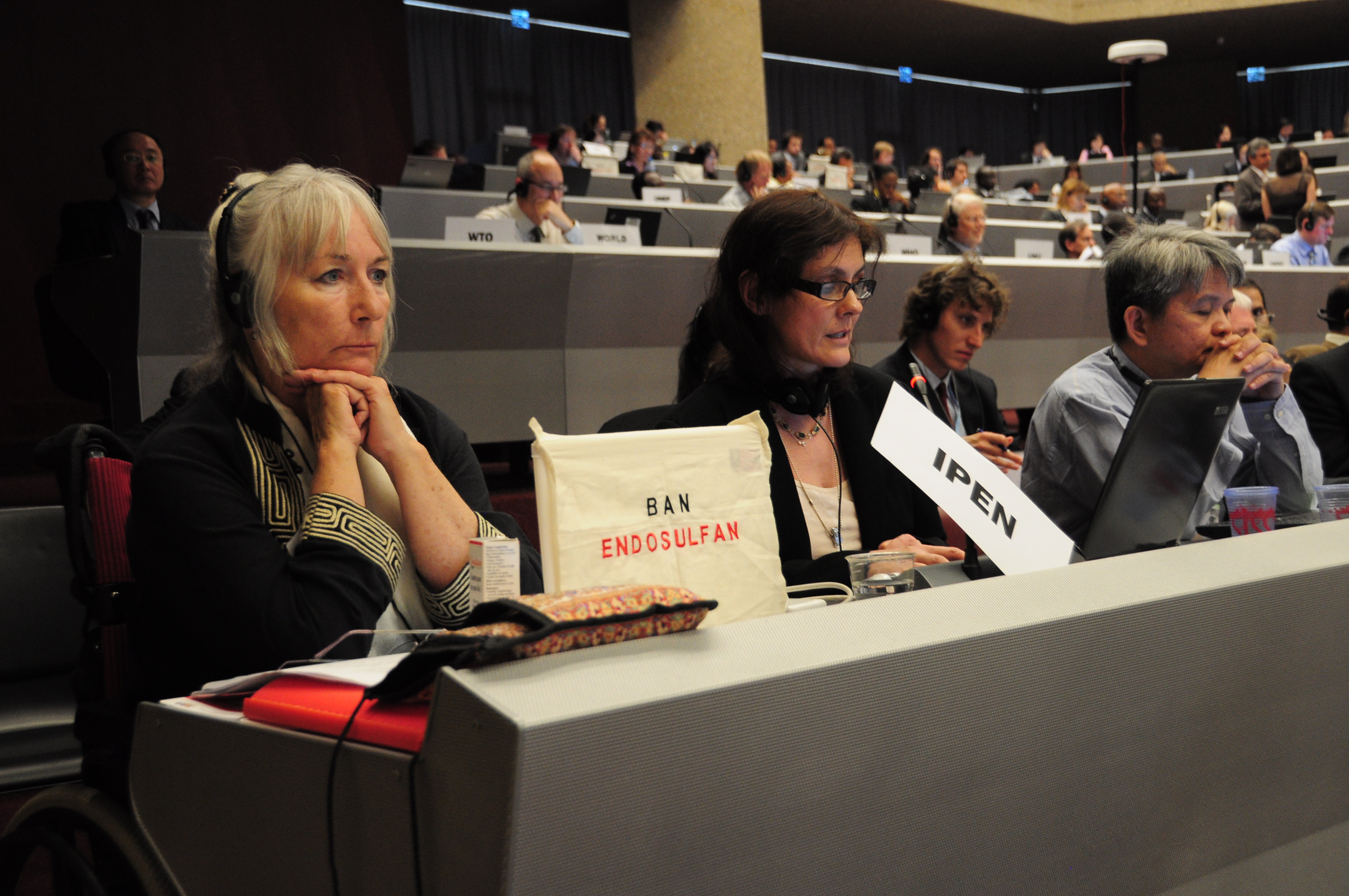
IPEN Co-chairs Mariann Lloyd-Smith and Olga Speranskaya at the Stockholm Convention meeting in 2011.

Lloyd-Smith has participated in global negotiations related to chemical safety, including those under the Stockholm Convention on Persistent Organic Pollutants, the Basel and Rotterdam Conventions, and the Strategic Approach to International Chemicals Management (SAICM). She has served as a member of the UN Expert Group on Climate Change and Chemicals and has been involved in developing chemical safety policies at the OECD and UNEP.

n her international advocacy work, she has assisted communities in addressing contamination from industrial facilities, including cases of hazardous waste incineration and unconventional gas extraction. She served as IPEN Co-chair from 2006 to 2011.

Lloyd-Smith's contributions to chemical policy and advocacy have had a lasting impact on environmental health regulations, particularly in relation to the control of toxic substances. In 2017, she received the “Gender Pioneers for a Future Detoxified” award from the Secretariat of the Basel, Rotterdam, and Stockholm Conventions for her work.
