= Osmoderma subplanatum =

Scientific classification
- Kingdom: Animalia
- Phylum: Arthropoda
- Clade: Pancrustacea
- Class: Insecta
- Order: Coleoptera
- Suborder: Polyphaga
- Infraorder: Scarabaeiformia
- Family: Scarabaeidae
- Genus: Osmoderma
- Species: O. subplanatum

Binomial name
- Osmoderma subplanatum CASEY, 1915

Synonyms
- Osmoderma montana Wickham, 1920

Species of beetle

Osmoderma subplanata, Franklin to the Fort, Missoula, MT, USA

Osmoderma subplanatum is a species of scarab beetle in the family Scarabaeidae. It is found in North America.
