= Anwar Fazal =

Malaysian environmental activist

Anwar Fazal (born 15 July 1941 in the village of Malaysia) is a leading civil society activist in multiverse issues including consumer, health, environment, urban governance, heritage and peace. In 1982, he was awarded the Right Livelihood Award for "fighting for the rights of consumers and helping them to do the same."

In 1978, he became the first person from the Third World to become president of the International Organization of Consumers Unions (IOCU). In the following years he became a crucial figure in the international consumer movement, founding several global networks, which he called “a new wave of the consumer movement.” These included the International Baby Food Action Network (IBFAN), founded in 1979; the Health Action International (HAI), created in 1981; and the Pesticide Action Network (PAN), formed in 1982.

== Honors, recognition ==
- Conferred the Right Livelihood Award for his work in promoting and protecting the public interest in 1982.
- Awarded the title "Activist of the Year" in 1983 by Ralph Nader's magazine, Multinational Monitor, and elected to the "Environmental Hall of Fame" by Mother Earth News.
- In 1988, he was presented with the "Global 500" Award by the United Nations Environment Programme (UNEP) for his work on consumers and the environment.
- Awarded the International Health Award in 1995 by the La Leche League for his work in promoting the welfare of mothers and children world over.
- Awarded an Honorary Doctorate in Law from Universiti Kebangsaan Malaysia (the National University) in Kuala Lumpur in 1997 and Honorary Doctorate in Philosophy from Universiti Sains Malaysia in Penang in 1999.
- Conferred Gandhi, King, Ikeda Community Builders Prize by the Martin Luther King Jr. International Chapel, Morehouse College in Atlanta, Georgia, USA on 21 October 2006
- Currently serves on the jury of the Goldman Environmental Prize, among the largest awards for grassroots environmental activists.
- Awarded Langkawi Environmental Award 2007 by the Malaysian government on 5 June 2008 in conjunction with World Environment Day.
- Anwar Fazal was appointed Director of the Right Livelihood College located at Universiti Sains Malaysia in Penang, which brings together all the Recipients of the Right Livelihood Award. He concurrently holds the position of Professor at the USM Center for Public Policy and International Studies (CenPris).
- Anwar was awarded the 2013 International Tower Person Award for Consumer Education by Technische Universität Berlin, Germany .
- Anwar Fazal was given the honour to deliver the 150th Mahatma Gandhi Anniversary Lecture at the Chulalongkorn University's Indian Studies Centre in Bangkok on 19 July 2019.
- Anwar Fazal is also known by the soubriquet Father of the Malaysian NGO Movement.
