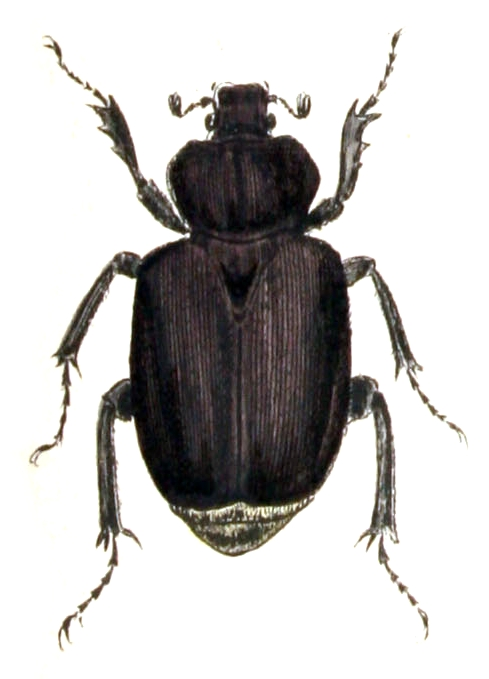
- Osmoderma eremita

Scientific classification
- Kingdom: Animalia
- Phylum: Arthropoda
- Clade: Pancrustacea
- Class: Insecta
- Order: Coleoptera
- Suborder: Polyphaga
- Infraorder: Scarabaeiformia
- Family: Scarabaeidae
- Subfamily: Cetoniinae
- Tribe: Osmodermatini; Schenkling, 1922
- Genus: Osmoderma; Le Peletier de Saint-Fargeau & Audinet-Serville, 1828

Species
- About 14, see text

Synonyms
- Osmodermatina; Osmodernum Burmeister & Schaum, 1840; Gymnodus Kirby, 1827; Trichius (Gymnodi) Kirby, 1827; Trichius (Gymnodus) Kirby, 1827

= Osmoderma =

Genus of beetles

Osmodermatini is a tribe of scarab beetles in the family Scarabaeidae with a Holarctic distribution. The tribe contains only one genus, Osmoderma, containing the Osmoderma eremita species complex that is widespread in Europe.

== Species ==
Osmoderma contains the following species:

- Osmoderma barnabita Motschulsky, 1845
- Osmoderma brevipenne Pic, 1904
- Osmoderma caeleste (Gusakov, 2002)
- Osmoderma cristinae Sparacio, 1994
- Osmoderma dallieri Pic, 1945
- Osmoderma davidis Fairmaire, 1887
- Osmoderma eremicola (Knoch, 1801)
- Osmoderma eremita (Scopoli, 1763) – hermit beetle
- Osmoderma italicum Sparacio, 2000
- Osmoderma lassallei Baraud & Tauzin, 1991
- Osmoderma opicum Lewis, 1887
- Osmoderma richteri Medvedev, 1953
- Osmoderma scabrum (Palisot de Beauvois, 1807)
- Osmoderma subplanatum Casey, 1915
