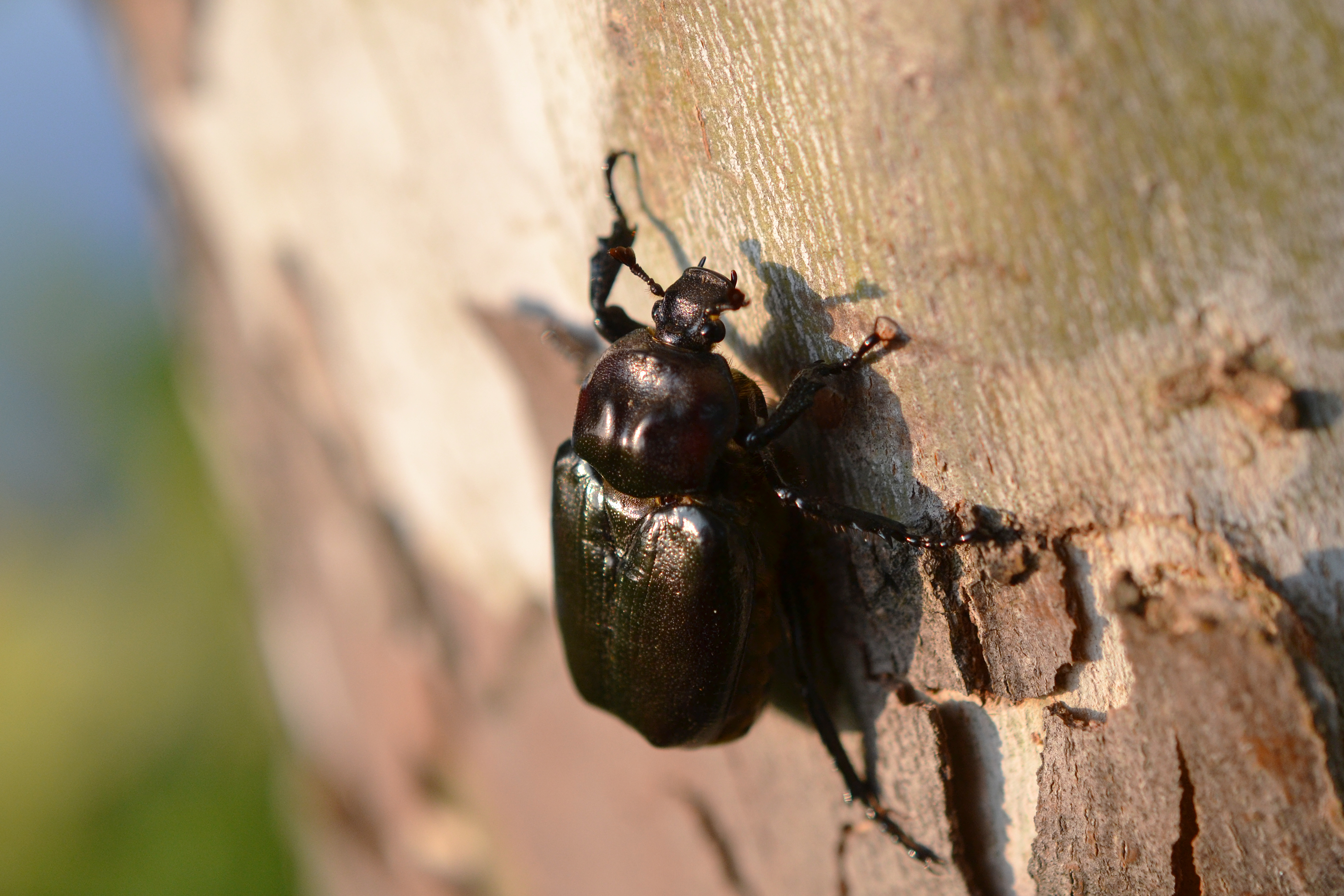

Scientific classification
- Kingdom: Animalia
- Phylum: Arthropoda
- Class: Insecta
- Order: Coleoptera
- Suborder: Polyphaga
- Infraorder: Scarabaeiformia
- Family: Scarabaeidae
- Genus: Osmoderma
- Species: O. eremicola

Binomial name
- Osmoderma eremicola (Knoch, 1801)

= Osmoderma eremicola =

Species of beetle

Osmoderma eremicola, also known as the hermit beetle or hermit flower beetle, is a species of scarab beetle in the family Scarabaeidae. It is found in North America. Large (21–32 mm), shiny, and dark brown, it can be found in wooded areas around tree trunks, and is said to give off a "leathery odor." It occurs from southern Canada through the U.S. Midwest and east to Georgia.

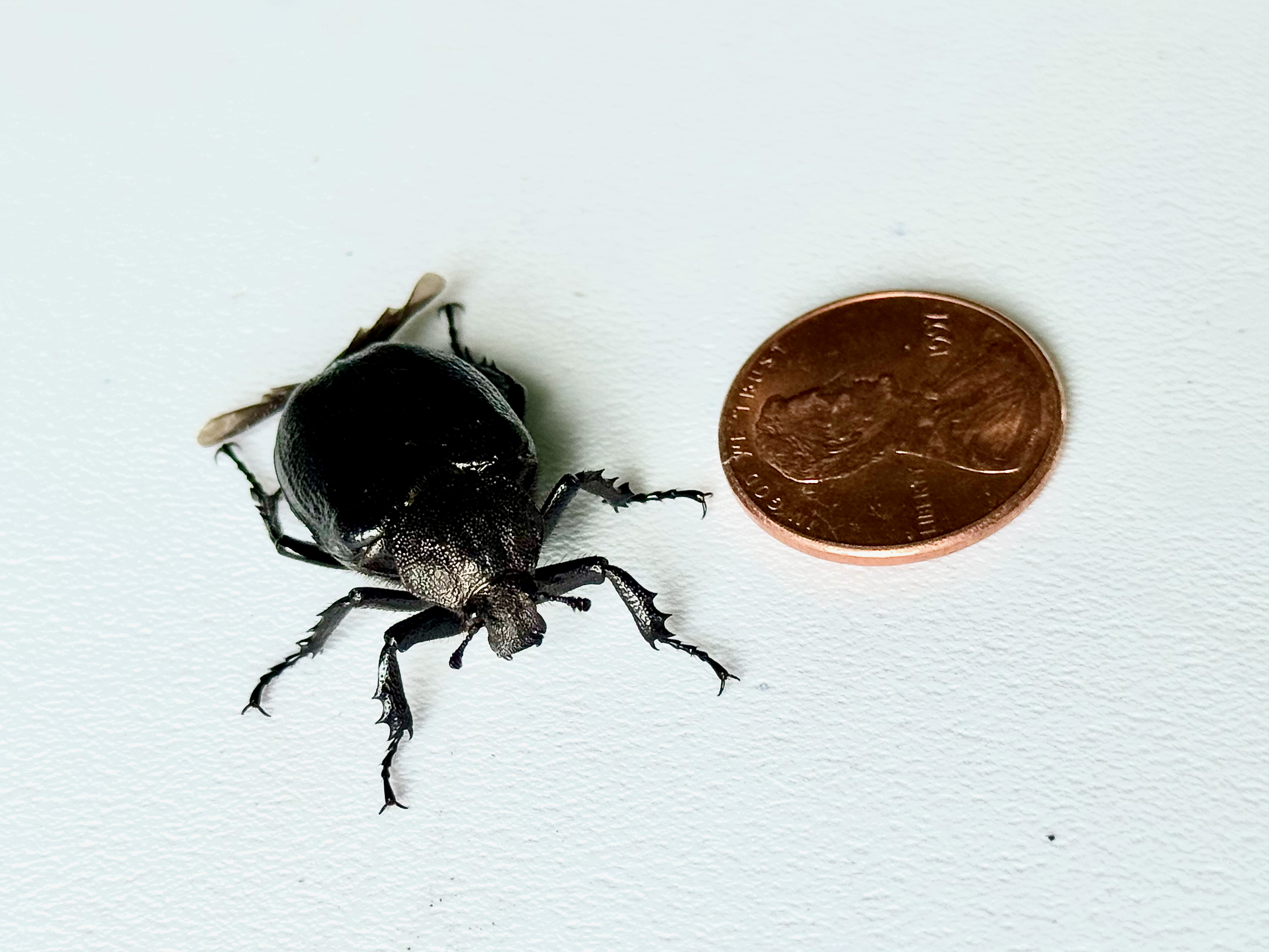
A hermit flower beetle (Osmoderma eremicola) next to a US penny, observed in western Massachusetts.
