= Olga Speranskaya =

Russian scientist and environmentalist

Dr. Olga Speranskaya PhD
- Ольга Сперанская
- Citizenship: Russian
- Education: Russian Academy of Sciences Institute of Water Problems; Moscow State University
- Awards: Goldman Environmental Prize (2009); Champion of the Earth (2011)
- Scientific career
- Fields: Environmental physics Geophysics
- Website: twitter.com/OlgaSperansk

Olga Speranskaya (Russian: Ольга Сперанская) is a Russian scientist and environmentalist. She has been the Director of the Chemical Safety Program at the Eco-Accord Center for Environment and Sustainable Development in Moscow since 1997 and holds a master's degree in Geophysics from Moscow State University, and a doctorate in Environmental physics from the Russian Academy of Sciences. From 2010 to 2018, she was a co-chair of the International POPs Elimination Network. Speranskaya has led many campaigns against the use of organic pollutants, fought to ban the burial and transport of hazardous chemicals, and provided information to government decision-makers for policy changes in many different countries.

Speranskaya's environmental activism started in the 1990s when the Financial Times printed her essay outlining the toxic environmental issues due to the Soviet Union breaking up. When the Soviet Union dissolved in 1991, thousands of tons of obsolete chemicals and pesticides such as DDT, which had been banned in the West, were left behind, scattered throughout Eastern Europe, the Caucasus and Central Asia. Improper storage and subsequent abandonment allowed them to leach into groundwater and become consumed by humans and animals, leading to birth defects and health issues. Compounding the problem is the fact that the stockpiles have been left in poor agricultural communities where farmers gather the chemicals to use on their crops and gardens, and in some parts of Asia, they are used to make fruit stay fresh longer, sold in open markets by women and children, and stored together with food products.

She stated that the problem had grown to such an extent that the authorities needed a heavy push to clean up these sites. Speranskaya pressured Moscow for years through her work at the Eco-Accord Center, an independent environmental watchdog, demanding it secure the stockpiles of chemicals and clean up the enormous mess left by the Soviets. She has also educated many people about the dangers the chemicals pose, and has united dozens of NGOs and activist groups to form an advocacy network. She said "The people in a town or village didn't understand the link between birth defects or health problems and the chemical landfill just in their backyard. There was no information out there. We started with information dissemination because we understood that we needed to build this information bridge to the people. The biggest result was that people started ... demanding action."

Her activities were influential in the ratification of the Stockholm Convention on Persistent Organic Pollutants by at least 128 countries, and a majority of former Soviet states; it was signed by then-president Vladimir Putin at the time, but the Russian Federation has yet to ratify it. Through the applied pressure of the NGOs she united, nine of twelve countries in the region participate in the Convention's global meetings.

In 2015, she attended a United Nations Environment Programme International Conference on Chemicals Management that had over 800 delegates from industry, civil society, and ministers. The conference resulted in the agreement to adopt risk reduction activities to manage toxic chemical exposure to people and the environment. She felt encouraged about the agreement, but was unsure if it could be implemented as the proposed project needed 100 million USD in funding but at the time only had 27 million available.

Speranskaya says Russian companies are still apathetic about the environment, and government regulation is weak, but she stays hopeful. "The environment is beyond any political issues," she says. "We need to continue working — to fight this legacy and to not allow the authorities to make it even bigger."

== Recognition ==
As a result of her environmental work, Speranskaya was a recipient of the Goldman Environmental Prize in 2009, and was named one of the Champions of the Earth by the United Nations Environment Programme in 2011.
