= Miroslav Šuta =

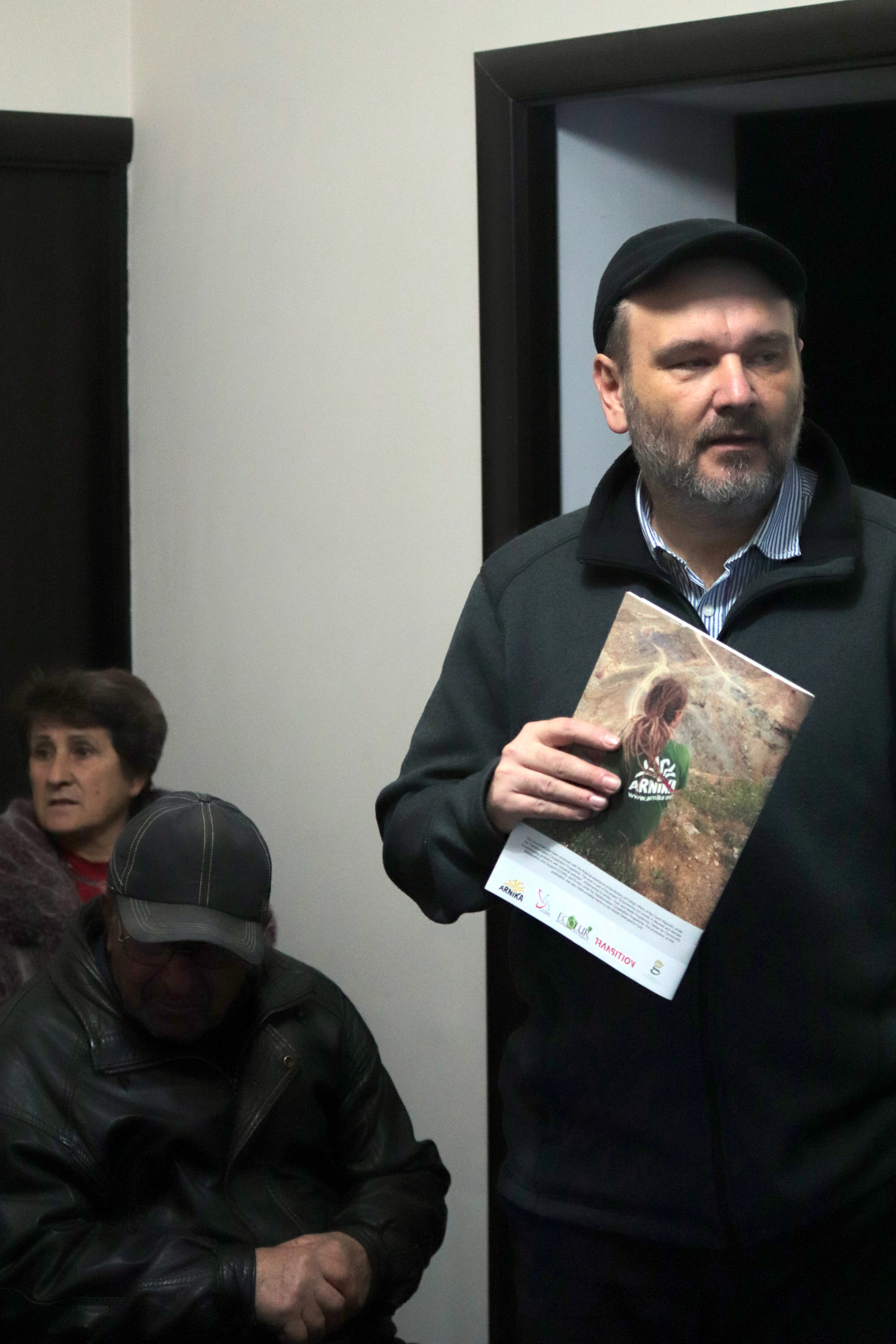
Image of Miroslav Suta Armenie

Miroslav Šuta (born 1969 in Chomutov, Czechoslovakia) is a Czech environmental expert and non-fiction writer.

== Activities in civil society organizations ==
He has been a member of the National committee for chemical safety since 1997 and several working groups of European Environmental Bureau (EEB). He came to the attention of the public between 2000 and 2002, when he was the coordinator of the Greenpeace Czech campaign against toxic substances, which succeeded in ending the sale of PVC toys containing phthalates.

He published articles in several Czech magazines, for example Respekt, Literární noviny, Sedmá generace (Seventh Generation), Odpady (Waste) or EKO - ekologie a společnost (ECO - ecology and society). He also works with Czech TV and Czech radio.

== Bibliography ==
- 1996 – The effects of car exhaust gases on human health (Czech and Slovak Traffic Club, ISBN 80-901339-4-0)
- 2007 – Biotechnology, environment and sustainable development (Společnost pro trvale udržitelný život, ISBN 978-80-902635-1-2)
- 2008 – Chemicals in environment and health (Ekologický institut Veronica, Brno, ISBN 978-80-87308-00-4)
