= Pesticide Action Network =

- Logo of PAN International
- Formation: May 1982; 44 years ago
- Founded at: Penang, Malaysia
- Type: International NGO, Nonprofit
- Purpose: Pesticide regulation
- Location: Berkeley, Brussels, Dakar, Penang, Santiago
- Key people: Anwar Fazal
- Website: https://pan-international.org

Pesticide Action Network (PAN) is an international coalition of more than 600 NGOs in 90 countries which advocates for less hazardous alternatives to pesticides. It was founded in May 1982 with its first meeting in Penang, Malaysia.

== Origins ==
The origins of PAN have been linked to the start of the "global anti-toxics movement". In 1981 journalist David Weir of The Center for Investigative Reporting, published the book The Circle of Poison focusing on pesticides, followed a year later by A Growing Problem: Pesticides and the Third World Poor by David Bull of Oxfam. In 1982, Anwar Fazal, a Malaysian activist who at the time was the first person from a developing country to head the International Organization of Consumers Unions (IOCU; later known as Consumers International), organized a meeting in Penang, Malaysia to explore the possibility of an international network of activists focusing on pesticide regulation. The meeting included Weir and Bull, that represented their respective organisations, as part of 14 participants from consumer and environmental organisations in developed nations, as well as 25 participants from developing nations. It was hosted by the IOCU and the Friends of the Earth, Malaysia. They decided to call "for a halt to the indiscriminate sale and misuse of hazardous chemical pesticides throughout the world" and proposed a model that would be based on an international communication network with regional nodes. By the mid-1990s, PAN operated as a decrentalised regional network with offices covering Africa, Asia-Pacific, Europe, Latin America and North America.

== Activity ==
Within two years of its founding, PAN organised several international meetings and engaged in negotiations with the UN’s Food and Agriculture Organization on the development of the International Code of Conduct on the Distribution and Use of Pesticides that was approved in 1985.

PAN lobbied international institutions to regulate pesticide trade by drawing on the concept of "prior informed consent". PAN led a civil society campaign that gained the support of the chemical industry in the early 1990s, after their initial opposition. This concept, was adopted by the Rotterdam Convention on Prior Informed Consent and the Cartagena Protocol on Biosafety. Prior to the Rotterdam Convention’s entry into force, an interim Chemical Review Committee was established and the Pesticide Action Network coalition participated as representatives of non-governmental organizations, alongside representatives from intergovernmental organizations (such as the World Health Organization) and several industry associations.

PAN has lobbied for the regulation of persistent organic pollutants (POPs). On 5 June 1985 it launched the international “Dirty Dozen” campaign, with actions that included protests at plants manufacturing chemicals on the list such as the Dow plant in New Zealand that produced the herbicide 2,4,5-T. In 1987, it called for the insecticide chlordimeform to be removed from the US market due to being a potential human carcinogen. Starting in 1995, PAN participated with other NGOs to the intergovernmental forums on persistent organic pollutants. This activity culminated with the Stockholm Convention on Persistent Organic Pollutants signed in 2001. To follow PANs activity on POPs, it spun off a new organisation known as the International POPs Elimination Network (IPEN). IPEN became one of the most prominent nongovernmental organisations in negotiations over the Stockholm Convention. During the late 1990s, PAN was involved in efforts to reduce the use of methyl bromide, which caused ozone depletion.

In 2000, Genetically Engineered Food Alert was launched by multiple organizations, including Pesticide Action Network North America, to lobby the FDA, Congress and companies to ban or stop using GMOs. On 18 September 2000, Genetically Engineered Food Alert announced it had identified StarLink, a GMO not approved for human consumption, in some Taco Bell-branded taco shells, leading to the StarLink corn recall.
