= Děti Země =

Czech non-profit organization

- Founded: 1989
- Headquarters: Plzeň

Děti Země (Children of the Earth – COE) is a Czech citizens' association for environmental protection.

COE was founded in September 1989, shortly before the Velvet revolution in Czechoslovakia, as an unofficial initiative of several ecological activists in Prague. Czech environmentalists Jindřich Petrlík, Miroslav Patrik, Ivo Šilhavý, Jiří Macas and Tomáš Fajkus were among founders of the association.

In the last two decades Dětí Země lobbied for ozone layer protection, sustainable transport and air quality, among other issues. Major focus of Děti Země since 2001 were environmental aspects of building new highways, in particular through České středohoří mountains. Their headquarters also moved to Plzeň.

Members of the Honorary Board are Jiří Dědeček, Erazim Kohák, Vladimír Merta, Zdeněk Thoma, Jaroslav Pavlíček and Jan Vodňanský. Ivan Dejmal, ex-dissident (Charta 77) and the first Czech Minister of Environment was a longtime supporter of COE.

== Bibliography (part) ==
- M. Patrik (editor): Dopravní politika v Evropě z pohledu nevládních organizací (sborník), Praha 1992 (ISBN 80-901355-0-1) (in Czech)
- J. Růžička:Cesty k udržitelné dopravě ve městech, Brno 1993, (ISBN 80-901339-1-6) (in Czech)
- R. Jungk: Atomový stát. Od pokroku k nelidskosti (The Nuclear State), Praha 1994 (ISBN 80-901355-5-2)(in Czech)
- M. Šuta: Účinky výfukových plynů z automobilů na lidské zdraví, 2008 (ISBN 80-86678-10-5) (in Czech)
