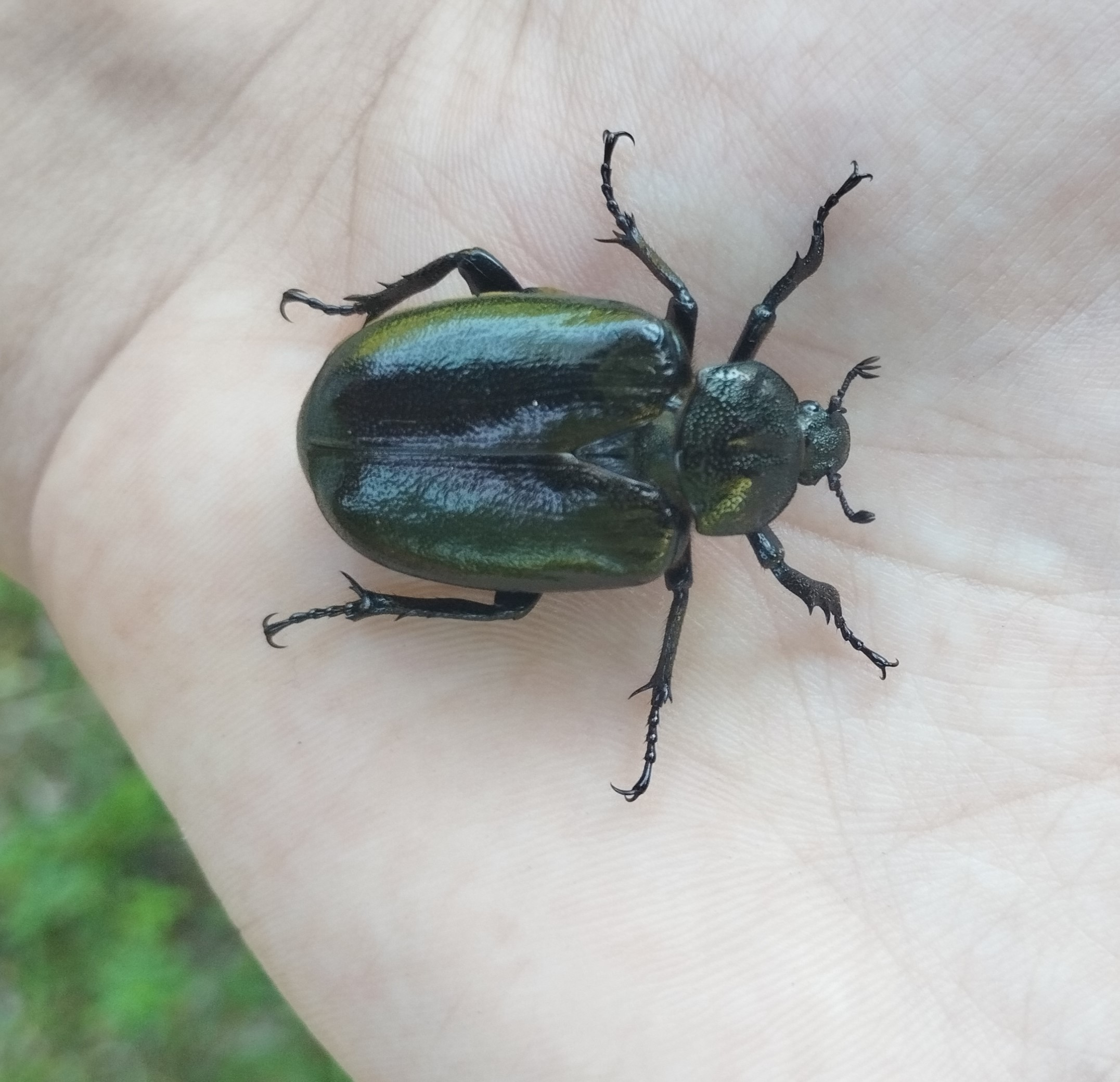

Conservation status
- Near Threatened (IUCN 3.1)

Scientific classification
- Kingdom: Animalia
- Phylum: Arthropoda
- Class: Insecta
- Order: Coleoptera
- Suborder: Polyphaga
- Infraorder: Scarabaeiformia
- Family: Scarabaeidae
- Genus: Osmoderma
- Species: O. barnabita

Binomial name
- Osmoderma barnabita Motschulsky, 1845

= Osmoderma barnabita =

Species of beetle

Osmoderma barnabita is a species of the subfamily Cetoniinae found throughout in central Europe, eastern Europe, and western Russia.

== Distribution ==
Osmoderma barnabita is recorded in Albania, Austria, Belarus, Bosnia and Herzegovina, Bulgaria, Croatia, Czechia, Estonia, Finland, Germany, mainland Greece, Hungary, Latvia, Lithuania, Moldova, Montenegro, North Macedonia, Poland, Romania, Russian Federation (Central European Russia, East European Russia), Serbia, Slovakia, Slovenia, and Ukraine.

== Conservation status ==
As of June 5, 2009, Osmoderma barnabita is near-threatened.
