= International Pollutants Elimination Network =

Global NGO network fighting various types of pollutants

Logo

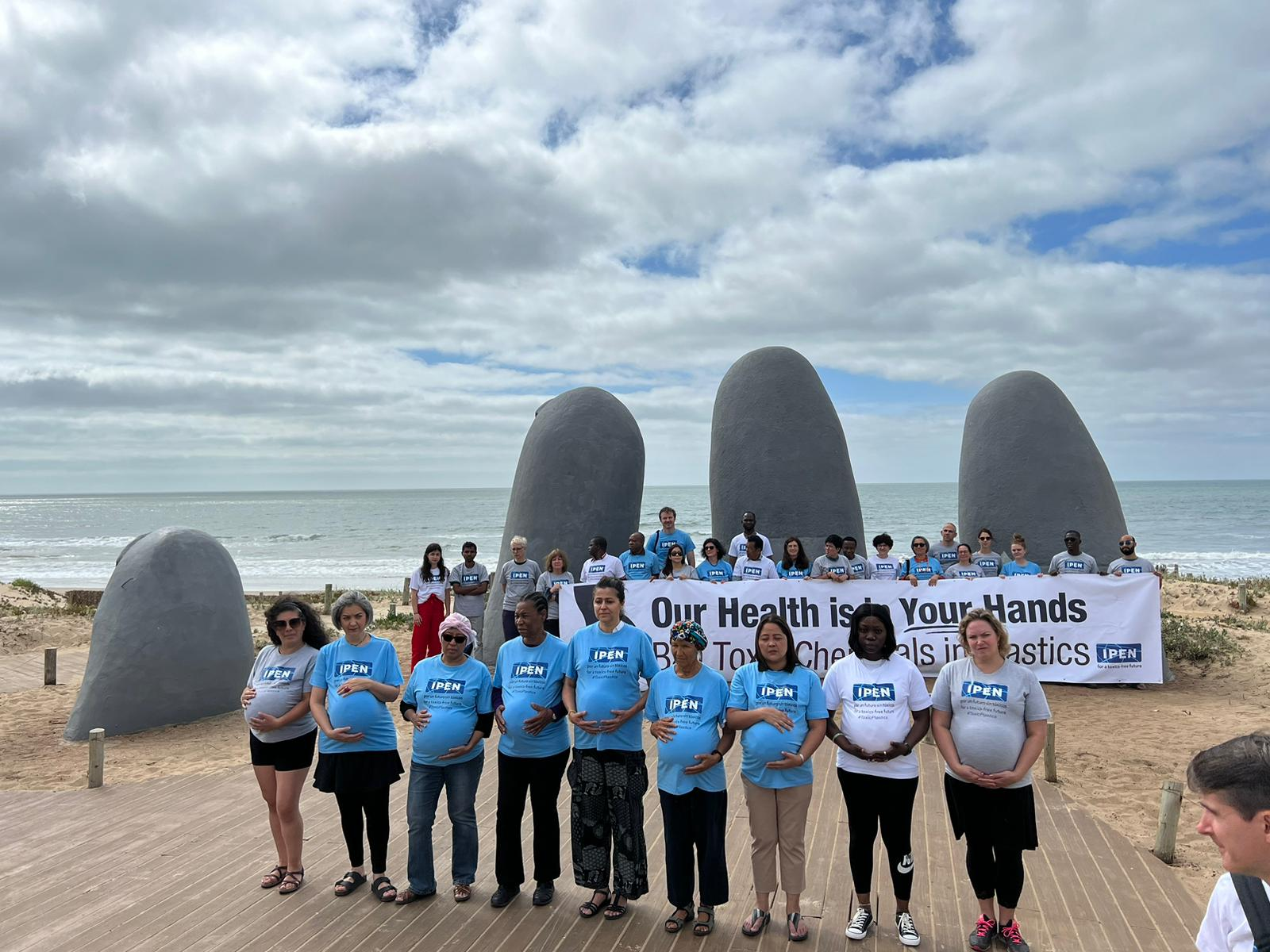
IPEN's action during the negotiations for a plastics treaty (Uruguay, 2022)

The International Pollutants Elimination Network (IPEN) (formerly International POPs Elimination Network) is a global network of NGOs dedicated to the common aim of eliminating pollutants, such as lead in paint, mercury and lead in the environment, persistent organic pollutants (POPs), endocrine disrupting chemicals, and other toxics.

IPEN was established by a number of environmental NGOs, including Pesticide Action Network (PAN) and Physicians for Social Responsibility in 1998. It became one of the most prominent NGOs in negotiations over the Stockholm Convention and has continued to play an important role in subsequent chemicals-related international negotiations.

IPEN is composed of public interest non-governmental organizations who support a common platform for the global elimination of POPs via the Stockholm Convention, work to influence the implementation of the Rotterdam and Basel conventions, as well as the Minamata Convention on Mercury.

IPEN's more than 550 public interest non-governmental organizations in over 120 countries work together for the elimination of toxic pollutants, on an expedited yet socially equitable basis. This mission includes achieving a world in which all chemicals are produced and used in ways that eliminate significant adverse effects on human health and the environment, and where POPs and chemicals of equivalent concern no longer pollute local and global environments.

IPEN is co-chaired by Yuyun Ismawati and Pamela K. Miller. Former co-chairs were Sharyle Patton (1998–2004), Romeo F. Quijano (1998–2006), Jack Weinberg (2001–2005), Jamidu Katima (2006–2010), Mariann Lloyd-Smith (2006–2011), Emmanuel Calonzo (2011–2015), Olga Speranskaya (2010–2018), and Tadesse Amera (2018-2024).

IPEN is coordinated via Hubs in eight regions: Anglophone Africa; Francophone Africa; Central, Western & (sections of) Eastern Europe (CEWE); a portion of Eastern Europe, the Caucasus & Central Asia (EECCA); Latin America; Middle East & North Africa (MENA); South Asia; and Southeast Asia. Centre de Recherche et d’Education Pour le Développement (CREPD) based in Yaoundé, Cameroon is the Regional Hub for Fancophone Africa. Arnika Toxics and Waste Programme based in Prague, Czech Republic is the Regional Hub for Central, Eastern & Western Europe. Association of Environmental Education for Future Generations, based in Tunisia and headed by Semia Gharbi, is the Regional Hub for MENA.

== See also ==
- Center for International Environmental Law (CIEL)
- Arnika (NGO)
- POP Air Pollution Protocol
