= National Unity (Czech Republic) =

National Unity (Národní sjednocení, NSJ) is a tiny Czech nationalist party which held its founding convention on 3 June 2002 in Zákupy. The party leader is Martin Čejka.

It fielded candidates in the municipal elections in 2002 in 13 cities, picking up a total of 17,744 votes. The following year, the party took part in the campaign against the Czech Republic's entry into the European Union. The party boycotts EU elections but participates in regional elections and senate elections. In present, National Unity have only 3 active members.

The name Národní sjednocení was also used by political party set up in 1934 in Czechoslovakia.
