= European Environmental Bureau =

Citizens' organizations network

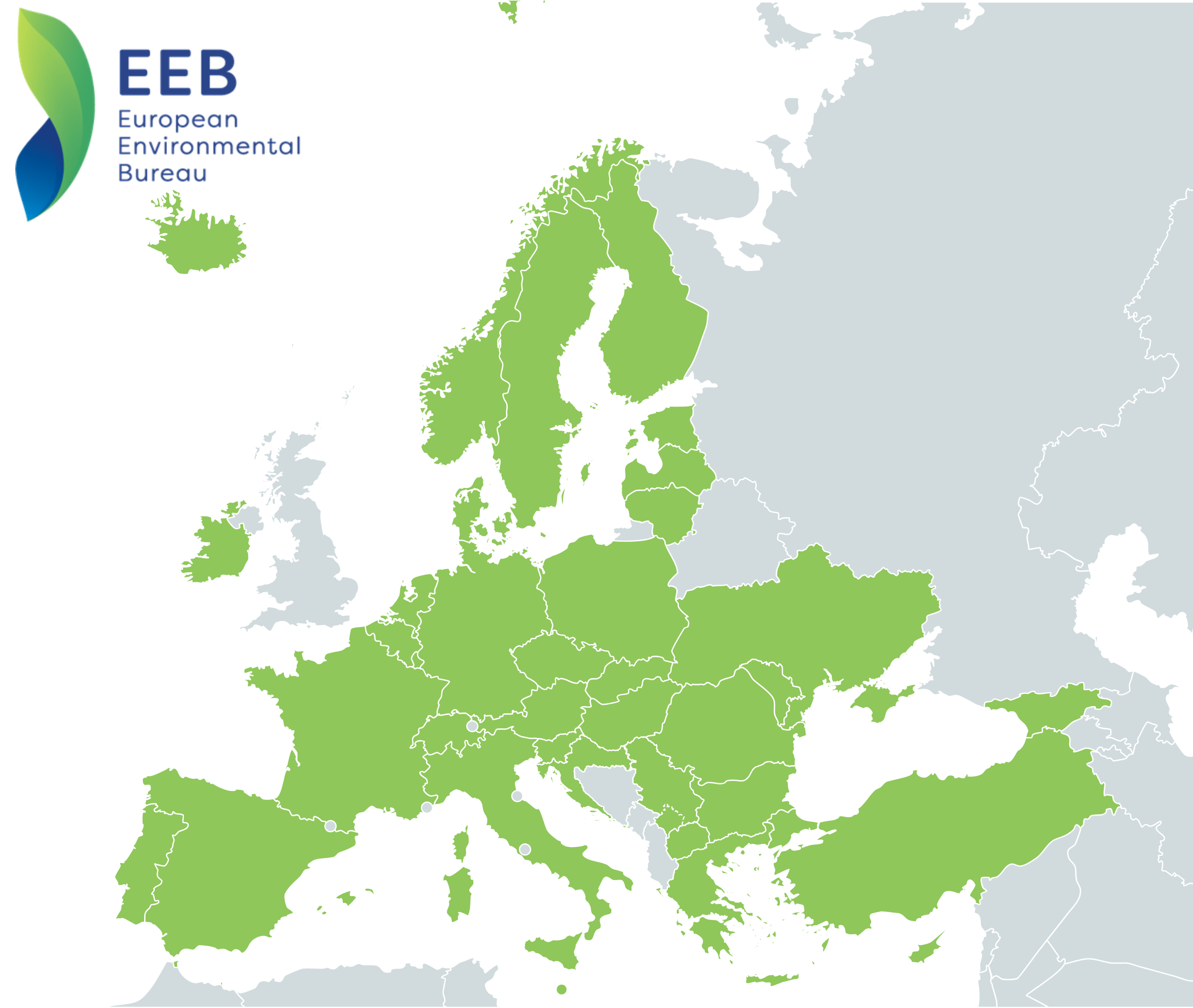
- Abbreviation: EEB
- Formation: 1974
- Type: NGO
- Headquarters: Rue des Deux Eglises, 14-16, 1000 Brussels, Belgium
- Region served: Europe
- Members: over 180 organizations
- Official language: English
- Secretary General: Patrick ten Brink (since July 2022)
- Main organ: Executive Committee
- Website: https://www.eeb.org/

The European Environmental Bureau (EEB) is a network of around 180 environmental citizens' organisations based in more than 40 countries, representing local, national, European, and international groups in European Union Member States and some accession and neighbouring countries. It plays a prominent role in defending and promoting environmental interests and legislation at the different EU institutions.

== History ==
Before the first Environmental Action Plan was adopted by the European Community, environmental NGOs from Europe met in the United Kingdom together with the European Commission, the UNECE, the UNEP, and the IUCN. During the meeting, the creation of a federation of non-governmental organizations within the European Community was proposed, which later became an information clearinghouse for the EC countries.

In order to give its members a central location to follow and respond to the developing environmental policy of the EU, the EEB headquarters was established in Brussels in 1974.

In 1998, the EEB led the issue group on public participation of the pan-European coalition of environmental citizens' organizations, later named the European ECO Forum, which was closely involved in the negotiating phase of the UNECE Aarhus Convention.

By 2013, it was considered one of the seven core environmental organizations in Europe, together with Friends of the Earth Europe (FFoE), Greenpeace International, the World Wide Fund for Nature (WWF), the Climate Network Europe (CAN-E), the European Federation for Transport and Environment (T&E), and BirdLife International.

EU political institutions had a large role in the formation and maintenance of Brussels-based umbrella and federation-type groups representing EU civil society through direct funding relationships (estimated at around 80 percent in 2005) from the Union budget, and by virtue of an early preference of the Commission for engaging only with EU-level groups.

== Activities ==
The EEB has an information service, runs working groups with its members, produces position papers on topics that are, or EEB feels should be, on the EU agenda, and represents its members in discussions with the European Commission, the European Parliament and the Council of the EU. It closely coordinates EU-oriented activities with members at national level, and also closely follows the EU enlargement process and some pan-European issues such as follow-up to the Aarhus Convention (the UNECE 'Convention on Access to Information, Public Participation in Decision-making and Access to Justice in Environmental Matters').

The organisation has consultative status at, and relations with: the Council of Europe, the European Commission, the European Parliament, the Economic and Social Committee of the European Union, the OECD (Organisation for Economic Co-operation and Development), and the United Nation Commission on Sustainable Development (CSD).

== Membership network ==
Environmental organizations in candidate countries (those applying to join the EU) may regard the EEB as their main partner with a European focus. The EEB's experience, relationships and position can be of value to these states in determining their own role in processes related to EU enlargement and the environment.

== Campaigns ==
In November 2004, working with the Ban Mercury Working Group, EEB launched the Zero Mercury campaign, whose ultimate goal is to achieve zero emissions, demand and supply of mercury, from all sources we can control, to reduce global environmental mercury levels to a minimum. An international Zero Mercury Working Group was created in 2005 to follow up developments at European and global level.

Since the beginning of 2011, EEB has been coordinating the Coolproducts campaign aiming at unleashing the energy savings potential of energy-related products.
