= Erazim Kohák =

Czech philosopher and writer (1933–2020)

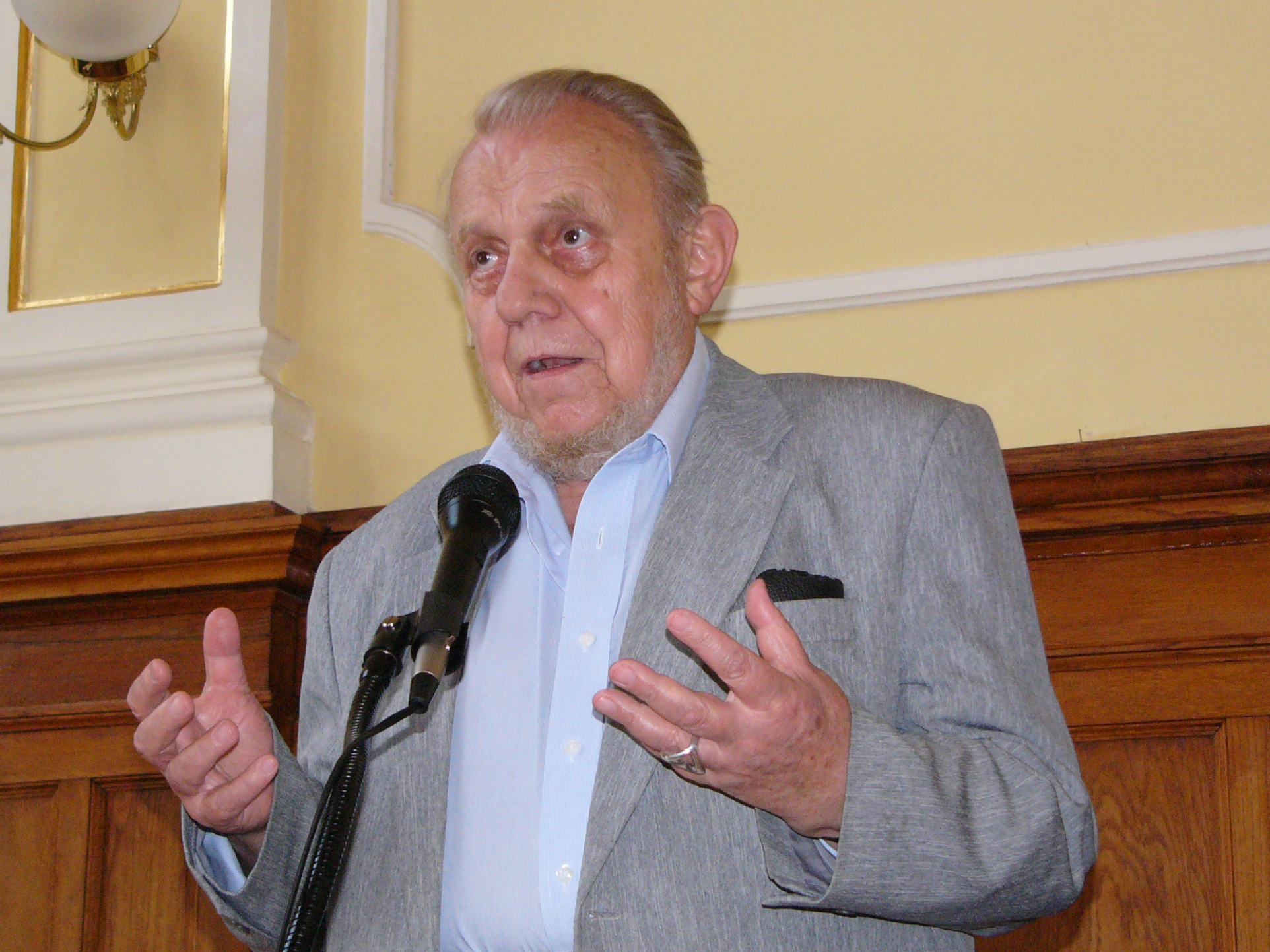
- Erazim Kohák in 2007
- Born: Erazim V. Kohák; 21 May 1933; Prague, Czechoslovakia
- Died: 8 February 2020 (aged 86); Prague, Czech Republic
- Occupations: Philosopher, writer
- Organizations: Děti Země; Společnost pro trvale udržitelný život
- Known for: Environmental ethics, phenomenology

Academic background
- Education: Colgate University (B.A., 1954); Yale University (M.A., 1957; Ph.D., 1958)

Academic work
- Doctoral students: Don Ihde

Erazim V. Kohák (21 May 1933 – 8 February 2020) was a Czech philosopher and writer. His early education was in Prague. After communists took over Czechoslovakia in 1948, his family escaped to the United States. He died in 2020 at the age of 86.

== Academic life ==
Kohák was born in Prague in 1933. He studied at Colgate University, earning a B.A. in 1954, and then studied philosophy, theology and religious studies at Yale University (M.A. in 1957, PhD in 1958). He also worked at Gustavus Adolphus College and Boston University (Professor in 1977). After the Velvet revolution in 1989, he returned to Czechoslovakia to become a professor at Charles University in Prague. From 2006, he was a senior research fellow in the Centre of Global Studies in the Institute of Philosophy at the Czech Academy of Sciences in Prague.

== Other activities ==
He supported several non-governmental ecological organizations and was a member of the honorary board of Děti Země (Children of the Earth) and Společnost pro trvale udržitelný život (Society for Sustainable Living).

== Views ==
Kohak has said in 2007 for BBC: "We have nothing to fear from a Russia in the ascendant".

== Bibliography ==
- Na vlastní kůži (The Time at Firsthand). With Heda Kovály. Toronto, 68 Publishers, 1973
  A dialogue about Communism and democracy with the widow of a prominent Communist executed in the Slánský trial (in Czech)
- The Victors and the Vanquished. With Heda Kovály. New York, Horizon Press, 1973.
  An English mutation of the above, rewritten for Western reader (in English)
- Národ v nás (The nation we bear within). Toronto, 68 Publishers, 1978
  An examination of the meaning, if any, of Czech and Czechoslovak national identity against the background of the Communist “normalization“ (in Czech)
- Idea and Experience: Husserl‘s Project of Phenomenology in Ideen I. Chicago, University of Chicago Press, 1978, 1982.
  An interpretation of Husserl‘s phenomenology stressing its critical and realistic thrust (in English)
- The Embers and the Stars: Philosophical Inquiry into the Moral Sense of Nature. Chicago, University of Chicago Press, 1984, 1987
  A philosophical essay based on life in a forest clearing, focusing on ecophenomenology (in English)
- Krize rozumu a přirozený svět (The Crisis of Reason and the Natural World).
  Smuggled into Czechoslovakia and 'published' there as samizdat in Václav Havel‘s series Edice Expedice, an examination of Jan Patočka‘s earlier writings (in Czech)
- Jan Patočka: His Thought and Writings. Chicago, University of Chicago Press, 1989
  A philosophical biography of Jan Patočka supplemented by translations of selected writings (in English)
- Dopisy přes oceán, aneb Čertování s Míšou (Letters across the ocean) Praha, State Pedagogical Publishers, 1992
  A collection of twenty quarter-hour philosophical reflections broadcast by Radio Free Europe in 1980-83 (in Czech)
- Jan Patočka: filosofický životopis (Jan Patočka, a philosophical life). Praha, Nakladatelství H+H, 1993
  Josef Moural‘s translation of the first part of Jan Patočka: His Thought and Writings (in Czech)
- P.S. Psové (Dogs: an afterthought). Praha, Nakladatelství ISV, 1993, 1996, 2001
  A collection of fifteen quarter-hour philosophical reflections broadcast by Czechoslovak Radio in 1992 (in Czech)
- Pražské přednášky: Život v pravdě a (post)moderní skepse (Prague lectures: Life in truth and (post)modern scepticism). Praha, Ježek, 1992, 1994, 1999
  Lectures at Charles University, given without warning upon my return in 1990, examining various modes of scepticism and responses to it (in Czech)
- Člověk, dobro a zlo (Of humans, good and evil). Praha, Ježek, 1993, 1999.
  Lectures in examining various conceptions of good and evil, concluding with ecological conception as fundamental in our time. Much needed rewriting in progress (in Czech)
- Hesla Erazima Koháka (EK‘s short answers).Praha, Nakladatelství Pokorný, 1993.
  A collection of columns presenting philosophy in short answers to young people (in Czech)
- Průvodce po demokracii (A Guide through Democracy). Praha, Sociologické nakladatelství, 1997, 1994, 1999
  A repeatedly reprinted beginner‘s introduction to the philosophy and practice of democracy, based on the conception of T.G.Masaryk, also tr. into Bulgarian (in Czech)
- Pravda a pestrost (Truth and Variety) Praha, Zdeněk Susa, 1997
  An essay pamphlet on the relation of life in truth and life in freedom (in Czech)
- Zelená svatozář: kapitoly z ekologické etiky (The Green Halo: Chapters from Environmental Ethics)
  Praha, Sociologické nakladatelství, 1998, 1999, 2002
  A broadly based introduction to problems and alternatives in environmental ethics (in Czech)
- Hesla mladých svišťů (Prairie Dog Homilies) Praha, Kalich, 1998, 1999, 2002, 2004
  A light-hearted catechism for young people, widely used in both Protestant and Catholic churches (in Czech)
- The Green Halo: Bird‘s Eye View of Ecological Ethics. Chicago, Open Court, 2000
  An English mutation of Zelená svatozář, rewritten for western readers (in English)
- Erazim Kohák: Poutník po hvězdách (EK, pilgrim among the stars). With R. Šantora and J. Zajíc. Praha: Portál, 2001
  Conversations about philosophy and theology in an autobiographical frame (in Czech)
- Orbis bene vivendi. (World of Welfare) Praha, Junák, 2001
  A collection of journal articles dealing with philosophy and ethics (in Czech)
- Dary noci (Gifts of the Night). Praha, Bonaventura, 2003
  A bibliophile edition of themes from ¨The Embers and the Stars revised and rewritten in Czech (in Czech)
- Zorným úhlem filosofa (From a Philosopher‘s Perspective). Ed. Marie Skýbová. Praha, Ježek, 2004
  A selection of journal articles on philosophy, theology, ecology and public affairs (in Czech)
- Svoboda, svědomí, soužití: kapitoly z mezilidské etiky (Freedom, conscience, coexistence: lectures in human ethics). Praha, Sociologické nakladatelství, 2004
  A systematic examination of philosophical options in the ethics of interhuman dealings. (in Czech)
