= Cabinet of Stanislav Gross =

Government of the Czech Republic from 2004 to 2005

Stanislav Gross' cabinet
- 6th Cabinet of Czech Republic
- 4 August 2004 - 25 April 2005
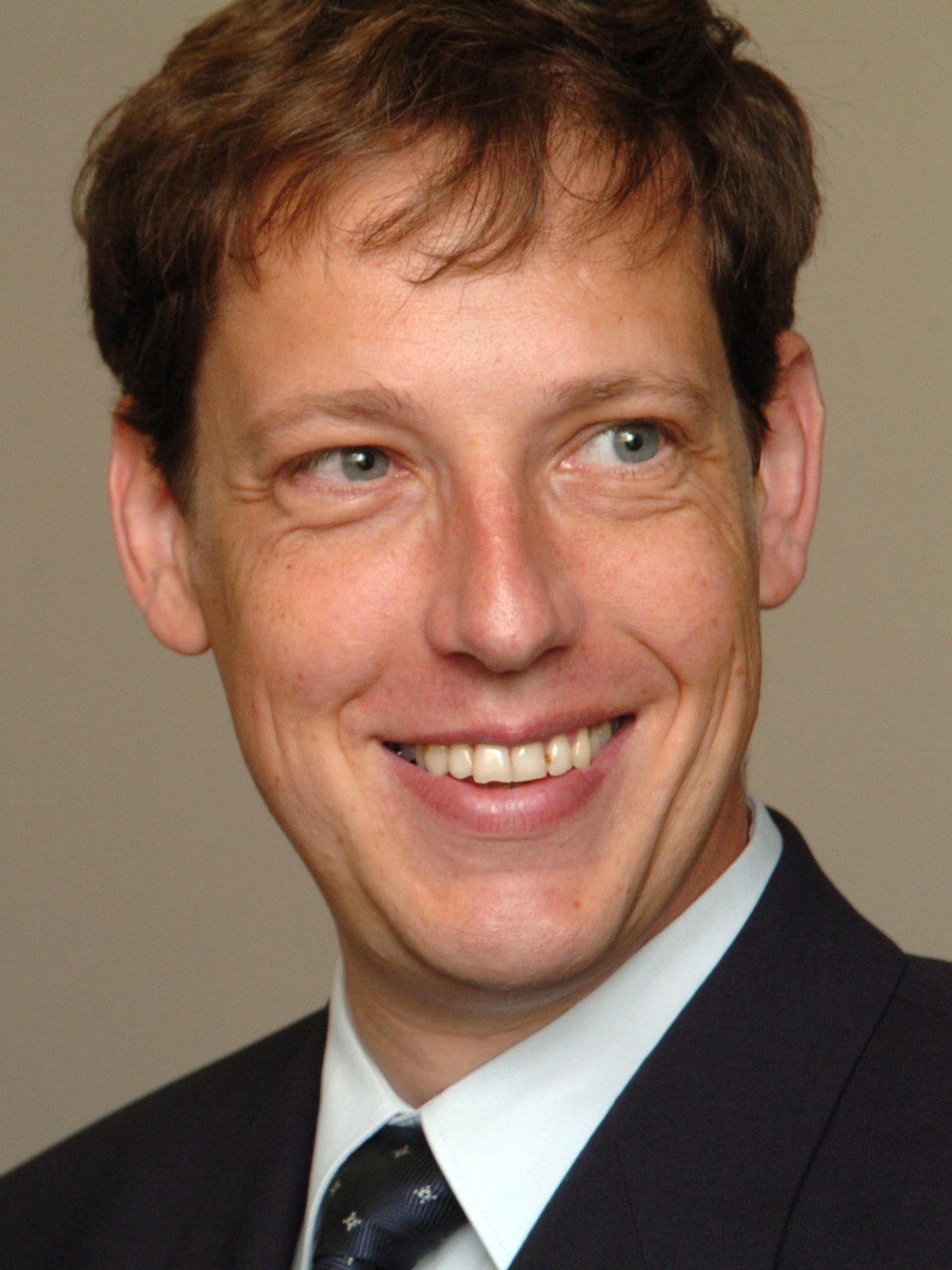
- Date formed: 4 August 2004
- Date dissolved: 25 April 2005

People and organisations
- Head of state: Václav Klaus
- Head of government: Stanislav Gross
- No. of ministers: 18
- Member party: ČSSD; KDU-ČSL; US-DEU
- Status in legislature: Majority government (Coalition)
- Opposition party: ODS; KSČM
- Opposition leader: Mirek Topolánek

History
- Incoming formation: 2004
- Outgoing formation: 2005
- Outgoing election: 2002 Czech legislative election
- Legislature term: 2002-2006
- Predecessor: Cabinet of Vladimír Špidla
- Successor: Cabinet of Jiří Paroubek

Stanislav Gross' Cabinet was formed by coalition of the Czech Social Democratic Party (ČSSD), the Christian and Democratic Union - Czechoslovak People's Party (KDU-ČSL) and the Freedom Union - Democratic Union (US-DEU). Stanislav Gross had to resign due to a scandal related to unclear origins of the loan to buy his flat. Gross' cabinet was replaced by Jiří Paroubek's cabinet

== Government ministers ==
Portfolio	Minister	Political party
Prime minister	Stanislav Gross	ČSSD
Deputy Prime minister and Minister of Labour and social affairs	Zdeněk Škromach	ČSSD
Deputy Prime minister and Minister of Justice	Pavel Němec	US-DEU
Deputy Prime minister and Minister of Transportation	Milan Šimonovský	KDU-ČSL
Deputy Prime minister for Economics	Martin Jahn	ČSSD
Minister of Finance	Bohuslav Sobotka	ČSSD
Minister of Regional development	Jiří Paroubek	ČSSD
Minister of the Environment	Libor Ambrozek	KDU-ČSL
Minister of Interior	František Bublan	ČSSD
Minister of Informatics	Vladimír Mlynář	US-DEU
Minister of Industry and Trade	Milan Urban	ČSSD
Minister of Health	Milada Emmerová	ČSSD
Minister of Agriculture	Jaroslav Palas	ČSSD
Minister of Culture	Pavel Dostál	ČSSD
Minister of Defence	Karel Kühnl	US-DEU
Minister of Foreign Affairs	Cyril Svoboda	KDU-ČSL
Minister of Education, Youth and Physical training	Petra Buzková	ČSSD
Minister without Portfolio (chairman of the legislative council)	Jaroslav Bureš	ČSSD
