= 2006 Czech Social Democratic Party leadership election =

2006 ČSSD leadership election
- 13 May 2006
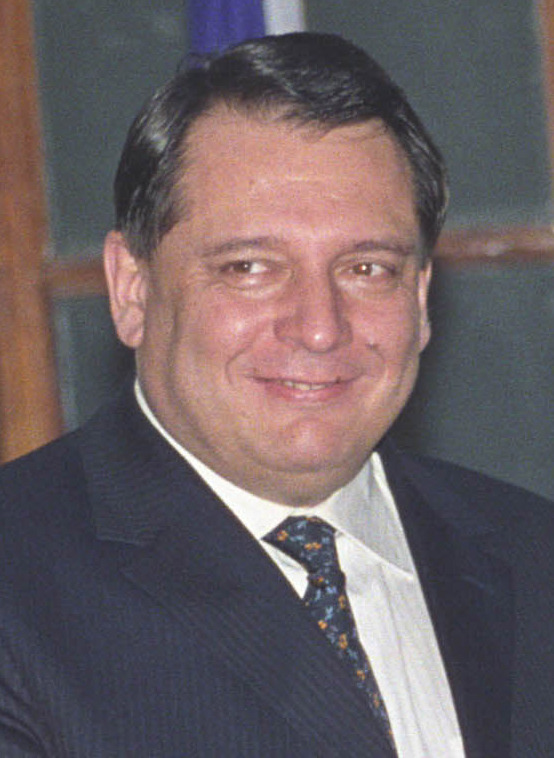
Candidate	Jiří Paroubek
Electoral vote	479
Percentage	92%
Leader of ČSSD before election
Bohuslav Sobotka (acting)
Elected Leader of ČSSD
Jiří Paroubek

The Czech Social Democratic Party (ČSSD) leadership election of 2006 was held on 13 May 2006. Czech Prime Minister and Jiří Paroubek was elected new leader of the party. Paroubek stated that he feels obliged by the result and that he plans to win next legislative election.
