= Dana Bérová =

Czech businesswoman and former government minister

Minister of Informatics
- In office 25 April 2005 – 4 September 2006
- Prime Minister: Jiří Paroubek
- Preceded by: Vladimír Mlynář
- Succeeded by: Ivan Langer

Personal details
- Born: 25 April 1967 (age 59) Czechoslovakia
- Education: University of Economics, Prague

Dana Bérová (born 25 April 1967) is a Czech businesswoman and investor. From 2005 to 2006 she served as Minister of Informatics in Jiří Paroubek's cabinet and was the first woman to hold this position. From 2009 to 2011, Bérová featured as one of five potential investors in television show Den D, the Czech version of Dragons' Den.

Family

Her former husband is Jan Dobrovský, a businessman, journalist, and philanthropist, with whom she has a son, Kryštof. With her partner she has another son, David.

== Career ==
=== Career until 2003 ===
She graduated in Automated Control Systems from the University of Economics in Prague. From 1987 to 1989, she also pursued interdisciplinary studies at the Faculty of Journalism of Charles University. Earlier in her career, she worked as a manager, media and television specialist, and consultant. She was also an editor at Czechoslovak Television and later Czech Television. From 1994 to 1997, she served as economic director of the Schwarzenberg Property Administration. Between 2000 and 2002, she was the program director of the regional television station TV3. She is a co-owner of the company Sanu Babu s.r.o., which imports goods primarily from India and Nepal.

=== Career after 2003 ===
She worked at the Ministry of Informatics from 2003 to 2006 and became Minister on 25 April 2005, replacing Vladimír Mlynář. Prior to that, as Director of the e-Government section and Deputy Minister of Informatics, she was responsible for projects involving the use of information technologies in public administration (such as the Public Administration Portal) and for international cooperation, particularly with the European Union.

After leaving the ministry, she unsuccessfully applied for the position of Director of Czech Post.

In January 2007, she became Director of Business Development at the analytical and advisory firm Gartner, specializing in communication and information technologies.

In 2009, 2010, and 2011, she appeared on the Czech Television program Den D as one of five potential investors whom participants attempted to persuade to invest in their business ventures.

As of 2023, she was a co-owner of the Golf Park Svatý Jan resort near Slapy and several other business companies.

== Xixoio ==
Since April 2021, she has been a member of the supervisory board of the company Xixoio. In December 2023, police initiated criminal proceedings in connection with the Xixoio case against two individuals and one company for fraud causing damages of at least CZK 353 million, with 2,931 clients registered as victims. The accused face up to 10 years in prison.
