= Opinion polling for the 2010 Czech parliamentary election =

Opinion polling for the 2010 Czech parliamentary election started immediately after the 2006 parliamentary election.

== Opinion polls ==
Date	Polling Firm	ČSSD	ODS	TOP 09	KSČM	VV	KDU-ČSL	SZ	SPO	Others
28-29 May 2010	Election	22.1	20.2	16.7	11.3	10.9	4.4	2.4	4.3	7.7
Exit poll	SC&C	20.0	20.0	17.0	11.0	11.0	5.0	3.0	4.0	9.0
7–12 May 2010	Factum Invenio	26.3	22.9	10.9	13.1	12.6	5.5	2.5	2.6	3.6
3–10 May 2010	CVVM	30.5	19.0	14.0	13.0	11.5	3.5	4.5	2.0	2.0
28 April–4 May 2010	Sanep	29.9	22.3	10.1	12.9	9.8	4.7	2.8	5.5	2.0
2 Apr - 1 May 2010	Median	26.2	19.0	10.7	13.3	7.6	7.5	3.5	6.8	5.3
23–28 April 2010	Factum Invenio	27.5	21.7	11.1	13.9	11.0	5.2	2.9	3.2	3.5
13–28 April 2010	Médea Research	30.4	18.7	13.7	10.0	12.0	4.4	4.9	3.7	2.2
7–13 April 2010	Sanep	29.0	20.1	13.4	13.0	8.5	5.6	3.6	5.2	1.6
5–12 April 2010	CVVM	30.0	22.5	11.5	13.0	9.0	4.0	4.0	3.0	3.0
1–10 April 2010	STEM	27.8	18.6	9.3	9.9	8.1	4.9	3.2	3.1	15.2
3 - 9 Apr 2010	Factum Invenio	29.5	22.3	11.6	13.9	8.9	5.5	2.6	2.7	3.0
2 Mar - 30 Apr 2010	Median	27.0	21.2	7.5	16.8	4.3	7.4	4.8	—N/a	11.0
1 - 8 Mar 2010	CVVM	32.0	25.5	10.0	12.0	7.0	4.5	4.5	3.0	1.5
27 Feb - 8 Mar 2010	STEM	27.9	20.0	7.7	11.3	6.2	4.8	3.8	3.6	14.7
26 Feb - 3 Mar 2010	Factum Invenio	27.4	23.0	11.8	14.4	7.8	6.2	4.7	—N/a	4.7
1 - 8 Feb 2010	CVVM	33.0	20.5	12.5	14.5	6.0	5.0	5.0	2.0	1.5
1–8 February 2010	STEM	28.6	23.2	9.1	11.7	4.7	4.3	2.7	2.0	13.7
29 Jan - 3 Feb 2010	Factum Invenio	31.0	25.1	11.3	13.5	—N/a	6.2	2.2	—N/a	5.5
4 Jan - 2 Feb 2010	Median	32.0	27.8	9.3	12.8	2.4	7.4	4.3	—N/a	4.0
22 - 27 Jan 2010	Factum Invenio	31.8	25.5	11.4	13.3	4.6	6.6	2.0	—N/a	4.8
11–18 January 2010	CVVM	28.0	25.5	13.0	12.0	4.0	7.0	6.0	1.5	3.0
2–11 January 2010	STEM	28.7	20.9	8.4	10.9	3.9	4.2	4.0	—N/a	19.0
1 - 9 Dec 2009	STEM	28.7	22.5	8.3	10.9	2.9	5.7	3.8	—N/a	17.2
30 Nov - 7 Dec 2009	CVVM	34.0	24.0	13.5	12.5	4.5	4.0	4.5	—N/a	3.0
5 - 11 Nov 2009	Factum Invenio	29.1	26.7	11.6	12.9	3.8	5.5	3.6	—N/a	6.8
31 Oct - 11 Nov 2009	STEM	25.4	23.3	8.4	12.3	1.8	5.1	3.5	—N/a	20.2
12 - 19 Oct 2009	STEM	26.2	25.2	8.7	11.6	2.2	4.1	3.2	—N/a	18.9
5 - 12 Oct 2009	CVVM	32.0	26.0	14.0	15.0	1.5	5.5	4.0	—N/a	2.0
25 - 30 Sept 2009	Factum Invenio	27.2	27.5	10.4	15.2	2.4	7.3	3.5	—N/a	6.5
21 - 28 Sept 2009	CVVM	32.0	28.5	12.5	12.0	3.0	6.0	3.0	—N/a	3.0
18 - 25 Sept 2009	STEM	27.4	23.2	9.2	10.6	—N/a	4.2	4.6	—N/a	20.8
31 Aug - 7 Sep 2009	CVVM	29.5	29.5	13.0	15.5	1.0	5.5	4.5	—N/a	1.5
28 Aug - 2 Sep 2009	Factum Invenio	32.6	27.2	11.9	13.8	3.5	4.6	3.0	—N/a	3.4
10 - 20 Aug 2009	STEM	29.0	24.1	6.8	11.2	—N/a	5.7	2.7	—N/a	20.5
3 - 10 Aug 2009	CVVM	33.0	31.0	9.5	13.5	1.5	5.0	3.0	—N/a	3.5
31 Jul - 5 Aug 2009	Factum Invenio	29.5	27.9	11.4	13.4	3.4	6.6	2.9	—N/a	4.9
17 - 22 Jul 2009	Factum Invenio	29.2	31.8	5.2	13.6	—N/a	5.2	3.7	—N/a	8.8
8 - 15 Jun 2009	CVVM	30.0	35.0	2.0	16.0	—N/a	6.5	5.5	—N/a	5.0
8 - 15 Jun 2009	STEM	28.2	28.3	—N/a	12.8	—N/a	6.2	2.7	—N/a	21.8
5–12 May 2009	STEM	32.4	23.7	—N/a	10.9	—N/a	5.9	5.3	—N/a	21.8
4–11 May 2009	CVVM	38.0	29.0	—N/a	15.0	—N/a	6.5	7.0	—N/a	4.5
1 - 6 Apr 2009	STEM	35.1	27.5	—N/a	10.5	—N/a	4.4	5.6	—N/a	17.0
30 Mar - 6 Apr 2009	CVVM	37.5	28.0	—N/a	15.5	—N/a	7.0	7.0	—N/a	5.0
2 - 9 Mar 2009	STEM	35.3	27.8	—N/a	11.0	—N/a	6.0	5.3	—N/a	14.6
2 - 9 Mar 2009	CVVM	36.0	31.5	—N/a	16.0	—N/a	5.0	7.0	—N/a	4.5
22 - 27 Feb 2008	Factum Invenio	37.3	30.7	—N/a	16.2	—N/a	6.0	8.3	—N/a	1.5
2 - 9 Feb 2009	CVVM	38.5	29.0	—N/a	15.5	—N/a	7.0	6.0	—N/a	4.0
31 Jan - 6 Feb 2009	STEM	35.2	25.5	—N/a	11.8	—N/a	6.8	5.1	—N/a	15.6
12 - 19 Jan 2009	CVVM	41.0	29.0	—N/a	14.0	—N/a	5.5	7.0	—N/a	3.5
2 - 9 Jan 2009	STEM	37.7	22.5	—N/a	9.9	—N/a	6.5	5.8	—N/a	17.6
11 - 16 Jan 2008	Factum Invenio	38.0	27.8	—N/a	17.5	—N/a	6.4	7.6	—N/a	2,7
2 - 3 Jun 2006	2006 Election	32.3	35.3	—N/a	12.8	—N/a	7.2	6.3	—N/a	6.1

== Seats ==
Date	Polling Firm	ČSSD	ODS	TOP 09	KSČM	VV	KDU-ČSL	SZ	SPO
28-29 May 2010	Election	56	53	41	26	24	0	0	0
7–12 May 2010	Factum Invenio	62	55	21	28	26	8	0	0
28 April–4 May 2010	Sanep	66	49	22	29	22	0	0	12
23–28 April 2010	Factum Invenio	66	51	22	30	23	8	0	0
13–28 April 2010	Médea Research	74	44	31	24	27	0	0	0
3–9 April 2010	Factum Invenio	70	53	23	30	16	8	0	0
1–10 April 2010	STEM	78	48	24	14	10	0	0	0
27 February - 8 March 2010	STEM	75	56	17	29	11	12	0	0
1–8 February 2010	STEM	77	68	19	31	0	5	0	0
2–11 January 2010	STEM	83	59	20	32	0	6	0	0

== Preferred prime minister polling ==
Date	Polling Firm	Mirek Topolánek	Jiří Paroubek	Petr Nečas	Karel Schwarzenberg	Radek John	Miloš Zeman	Vojtěch Filip	Ondřej Liška	Cyril Svoboda
4 May 2010	Médea Research	N/A	13.0	13.0	16.0	22.0	N/A	N/A	N/A	N/A
22 April 2010	SANEP	N/A	26.3	24.7	39.2	43.3	29.4	15.5	11.3	19.7
16 April 2010	Factum Invenio	N/A	14.6	12.2	8.4	5.2	N/A	5.4	N/A	N/A
14 April 2010	Median	N/A	20.0	30.6	30.8	N/A	N/A	N/A	N/A	N/A
27 March 2010	Median	N/A	35.0	53.0	N/A	N/A	N/A	N/A	N/A	N/A
10 August 2009	Median	19.2	17.4	N/A	5.7	N/A	N/A	7.4	3.2	N/A

== Other surveys ==
Date	Polling Firm	ČSSD	ODS	TOP 09	KSČM	VV	KDU-ČSL	SZ	SPO	Others
21 May 2010	iDnes Virtual Election	4.3	23.1	33.0	1.7	11.3	3.1	6.5	3.3	
28–29 April	Student Election	5.3	17.6	26.6	3.0	12.1	1.7	5.3	3.1	25.3
