= Cabinet of Jiří Paroubek =

Jiří Paroubek's cabinet
- 7th Cabinet of Czech Republic
- 25 April 2005 - 4 September 2006
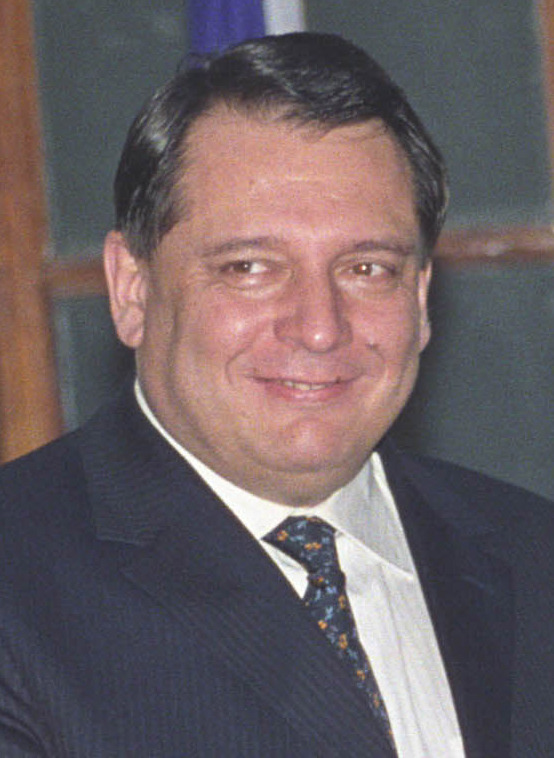
- Date formed: 25 April 2005
- Date dissolved: 4 September 2006

People and organisations
- Head of state: Václav Klaus
- Head of government: Jiří Paroubek
- No. of ministers: 18
- Member party: ČSSD; KDU-ČSL; US-DEU
- Status in legislature: Majority government (Coalition)
- Opposition party: ODS; KSČM
- Opposition leader: Mirek Topolánek

History
- Outgoing election: 2002 Czech legislative election
- Legislature term: 2002-2006
- Incoming formation: 2005
- Outgoing formation: 2006
- Predecessor: Cabinet of Stanislav Gross
- Successor: First Cabinet of Mirek Topolánek

The Government of the Czech Republic from April 25, 2005 to September 4, 2006 was formed by coalition of the Czech Social Democratic Party (ČSSD), the Christian and Democratic Union - Czechoslovak People's Party (KDU-ČSL) and the Freedom Union - Democratic Union (US-DEU). Three members of the cabinet were women.

Portfolio	Minister	Political party
Prime minister	Jiří Paroubek	ČSSD
Deputy Prime minister and Minister of Finance	Bohuslav Sobotka	ČSSD
Deputy Prime minister and Minister of Labour and social affairs	Zdeněk Škromach	ČSSD
Deputy Prime minister and Minister of Justice	Pavel Němec	US-DEU
Deputy Prime minister and Minister of Transportation	Milan Šimonovský	KDU-ČSL
Deputy Prime minister for Economics	Martin Jahn	ČSSD
Deputy Prime minister for Economics	Jiří Havel	ČSSD
Minister of Regional development	Radko Martínek	ČSSD
Minister of the Environment	Libor Ambrozek	KDU-ČSL
Minister of Interior	František Bublan	ČSSD
Minister of Informatics	Dana Bérová	US-DEU
Minister of Industry and Trade	Milan Urban	ČSSD
Minister of Health	Milada Emmerová	ČSSD
Minister of Health	David Rath	ČSSD
Minister of Agriculture	Petr Zgarba	ČSSD
Minister of Agriculture	Jan Mládek	ČSSD
Minister of Culture	Pavel Dostál	ČSSD
Minister of Culture	Vítězslav Jandák	ČSSD
Minister of Defence	Karel Kühnl	US-DEU
Minister of Foreign Affairs	Cyril Svoboda	KDU-ČSL
Minister of Education, Youth and Physical training	Petra Buzková	ČSSD
Minister without Portfolio (Chairman of the legislative council)	Pavel Zářecký	ČSSD
