= 2009 Czech Social Democratic Party leadership election =

2009 ČSSD leadership election
- 21 March 2009
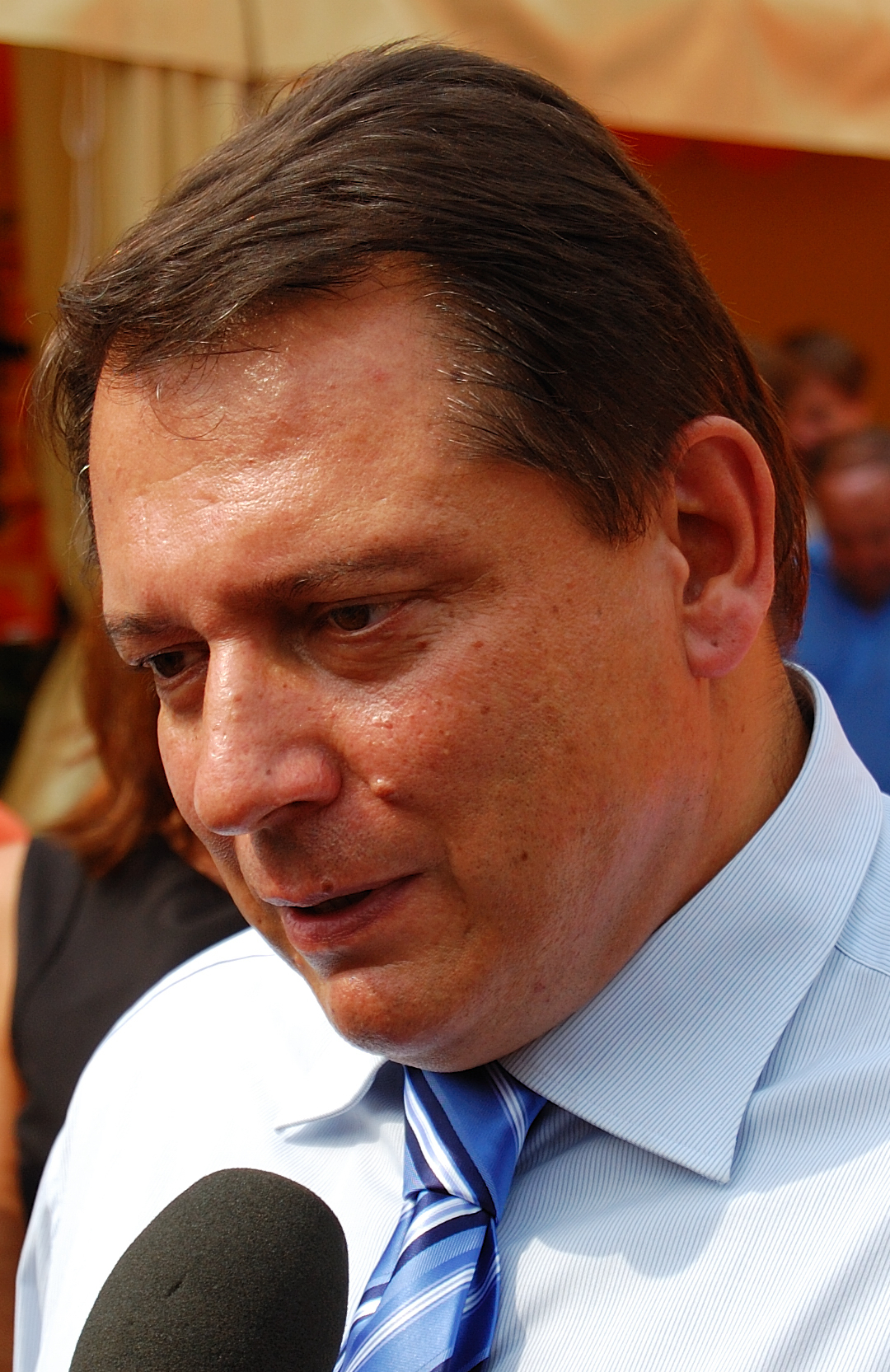
Candidate	Jiří Paroubek
Electoral vote	410
Percentage	74%
Leader of ČSSD before election
Jiří Paroubek
Elected Leader of ČSSD
Jiří Paroubek

The Czech Social Democratic Party (ČSSD) leadership election of 2007 was held on 21 March 2009. Jiří Paroubek was reelected as party's leader when he received 74%. Paroubek was the only candidate.
