= 2017 Czech Social Democratic Party leadership election =

2017 ČSSD leadership election
- 10 March 2017
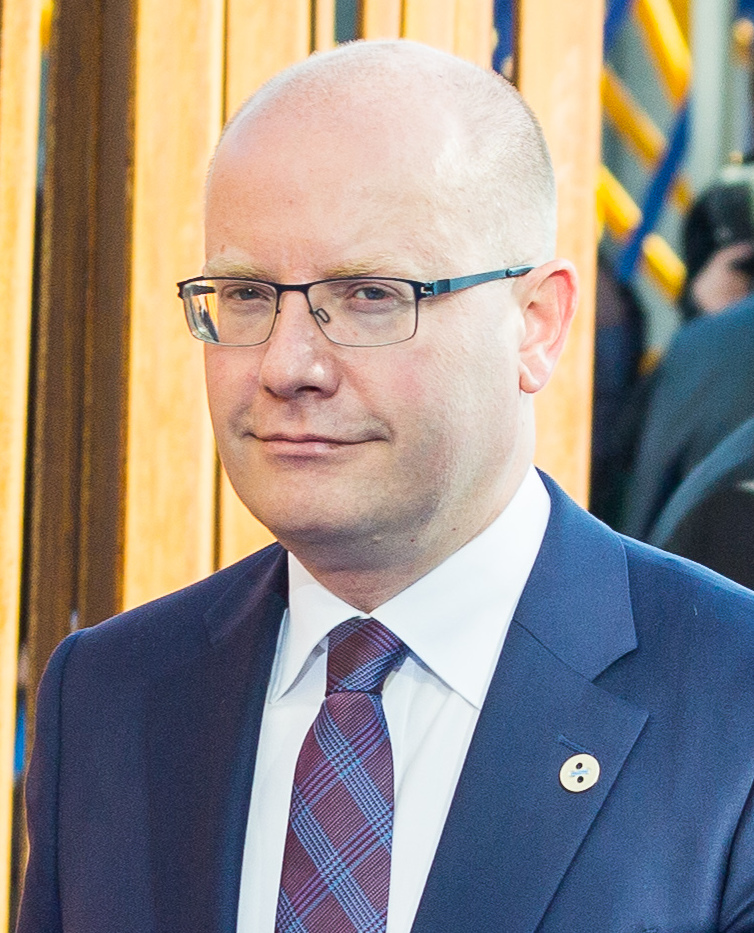
Candidate	Bohuslav Sobotka
Electoral vote	460
Percentage	69.6%
Leader of ČSSD before election
Bohuslav Sobotka
Elected Leader of ČSSD
Bohuslav Sobotka

The Czech Social Democratic Party (ČSSD) held a leadership election on 10 March 2017, prior to the October 2017 legislative elections. The incumbent leader and Prime Minister of the Czech Republic Bohuslav Sobotka was the only candidate.

== Background ==
According to Hospodářské Noviny, Sobotka said that he would seek another term as the leader of ČSSD only if the party remained as the strongest party in the 2016 regional and Senate elections. These words were later said to be misinterpreted. When ČSSD was defeated in both elections, speculation began that South Bohemia Governor Jiří Zimola would run against Sobotka, due to his performance in the regional elections and his criticism of Sobotka and comments that Sobotka should reconsider his candidacy. Zimola also said he believed that Sobotka could remain Prime Minister until the 2017 elections, even if ČSSD was led by someone else. Zimola later said that he would not run for the party leadership as he did not want to divide the party. Sobotka was endorsed by 12 regional organisations of the party, but the South Bohemian organisation refused to support Sobotka's candidacy.

== Result ==
Bohuskav Sobotka was reelected with 67% of the votes from the 681 delegates, but the result was interpreted as an indication of his low support within the party, though Sobotka himself stated that he believed he had a strong mandate.

Bohuslav Sobotka	Against
460	201
