= 2013 Czech Social Democratic Party leadership election =

2013 ČSSD leadership election
- 15 March 2013
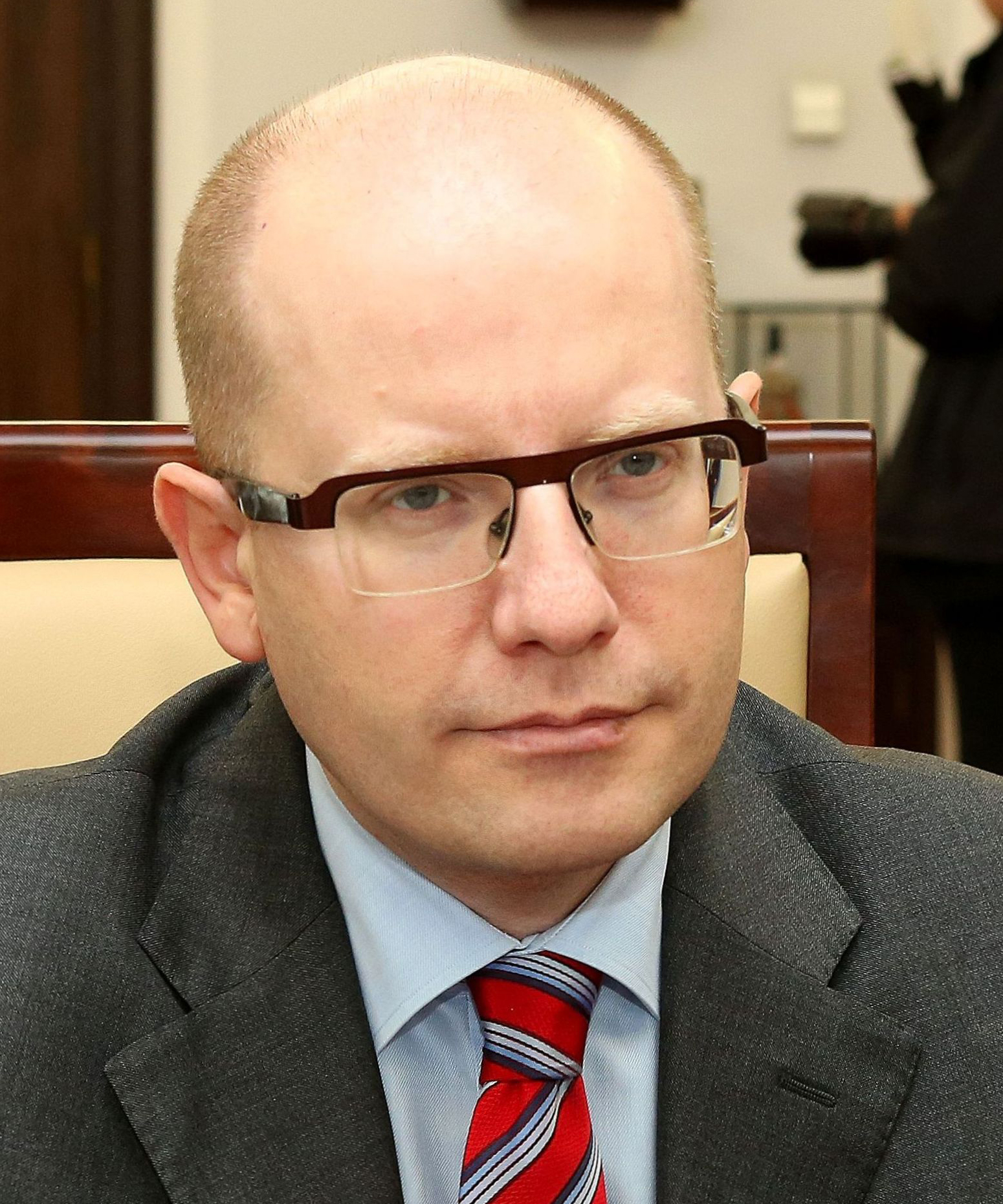
Candidate	Bohuslav Sobotka
Electoral vote	507
Percentage	84%
Leader of ČSSD before election
Bohuslav Sobotka
Elected Leader of ČSSD
Bohuslav Sobotka

The Czech Social Democratic Party (ČSSD) leadership election of 2015 was held in March 2013. The incumbent leader Bohuslav Sobotka was elected for another term. Sobotka received 84% of votes.

== Voting ==
Bohuslav Sobotka	Against
606 (87.7%)	85
