= 2011 Czech Social Democratic Party leadership election =

2011 ČSSD leadership election
- 18 March 2011
- Turnout: 97,4%
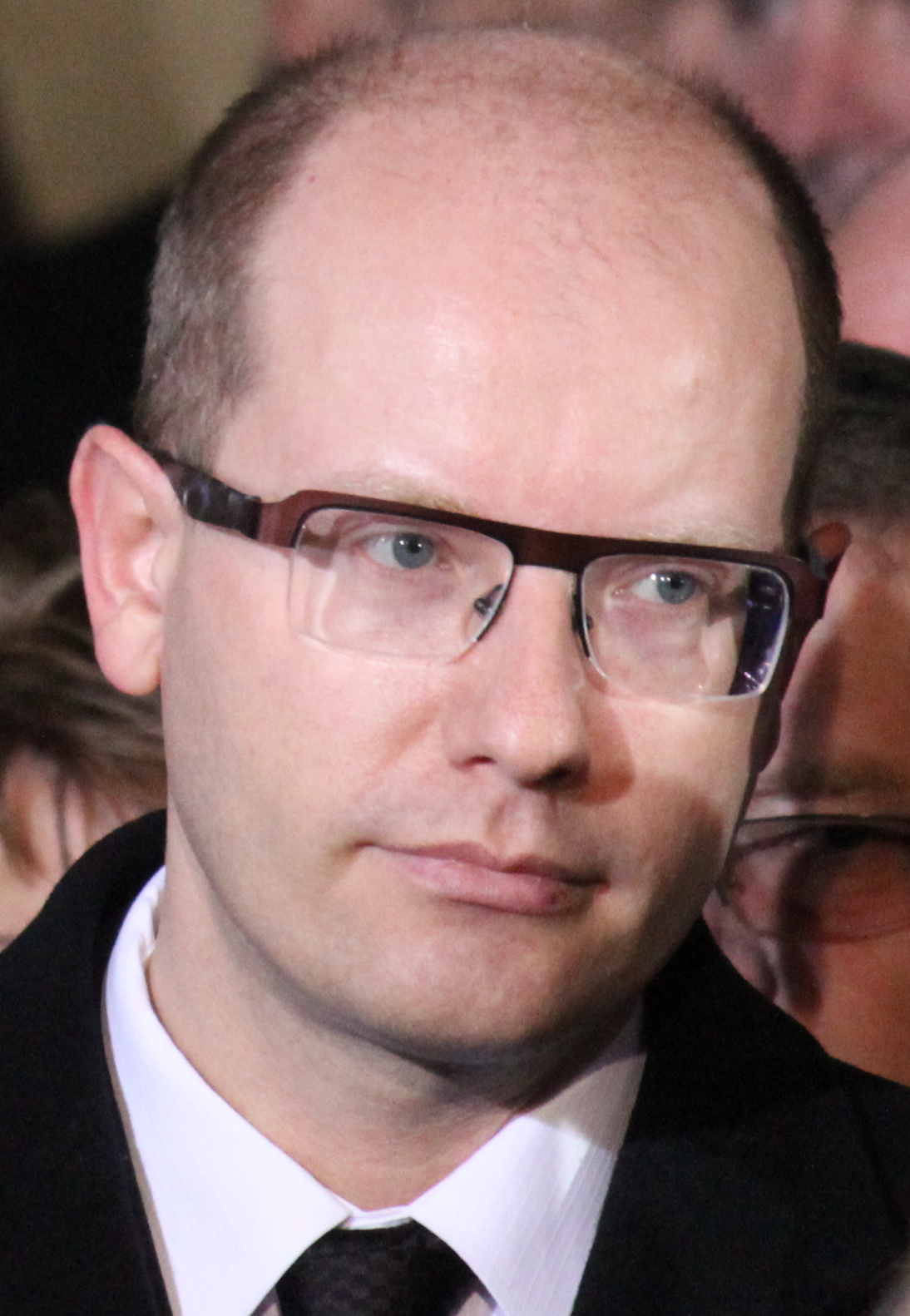

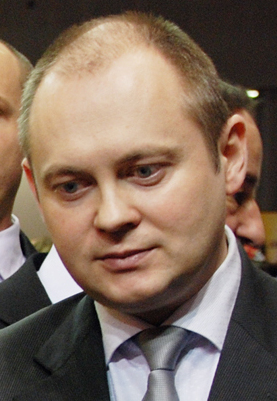
| Candidate | Bohuslav Sobotka | Michal Hašek |
| Electoral vote | 294 | 258 |
| Percentage | 53.3% | 46.7% |
Leader of ČSSD before election
Bohuslav Sobotka (acting)
Elected Leader of ČSSD
Bohuslav Sobotka

The Czech Social Democratic Party (ČSSD) leadership election of 2011 happened as a result of 2010 Czech legislative election which led to the resignation of incumbent leader Jiří Paroubek. The leadership election was considered a duel between Bohuslav Sobotka and Michal Hašek who were main candidates. They were both endorsed by 7 Regional organisations of party. Other candidates included Vladimír Dryml. Out of 609 delegates, only 593 delegates (97,4%) voted.

Bohuslav Sobotka won in second round when he received 304 votes while Hašek received 258. Sobotka became the leader of ČSSD. Hašek then became the Vice Chairman of the party.

== Opinion Polls ==
| Agency | Date | Sample | Bohuslav Sobotka | Michal Hašek | Jiří Paroubek | Not Decided |
|---|---|---|---|---|---|---|
| Millward Brown | 11–15 March | 568 People | 24% | 16% | 16% | 39% |
| Millward Brown | 11–15 March | Voters of ČSSD | 35% | 19% | 33% | - |

== Results ==
| Candidate | 1st Round | | 2nd Round | |
|---|---|---|---|---|
| Bohuslav Sobotka | 298 | 49.91% | 304 | 53.3% |
| Michal Hašek | 291 | 48.74% | 258 | 46.7% |
