= 2015 Czech Social Democratic Party leadership election =

2015 ČSSD leadership election
- 13 March 2015
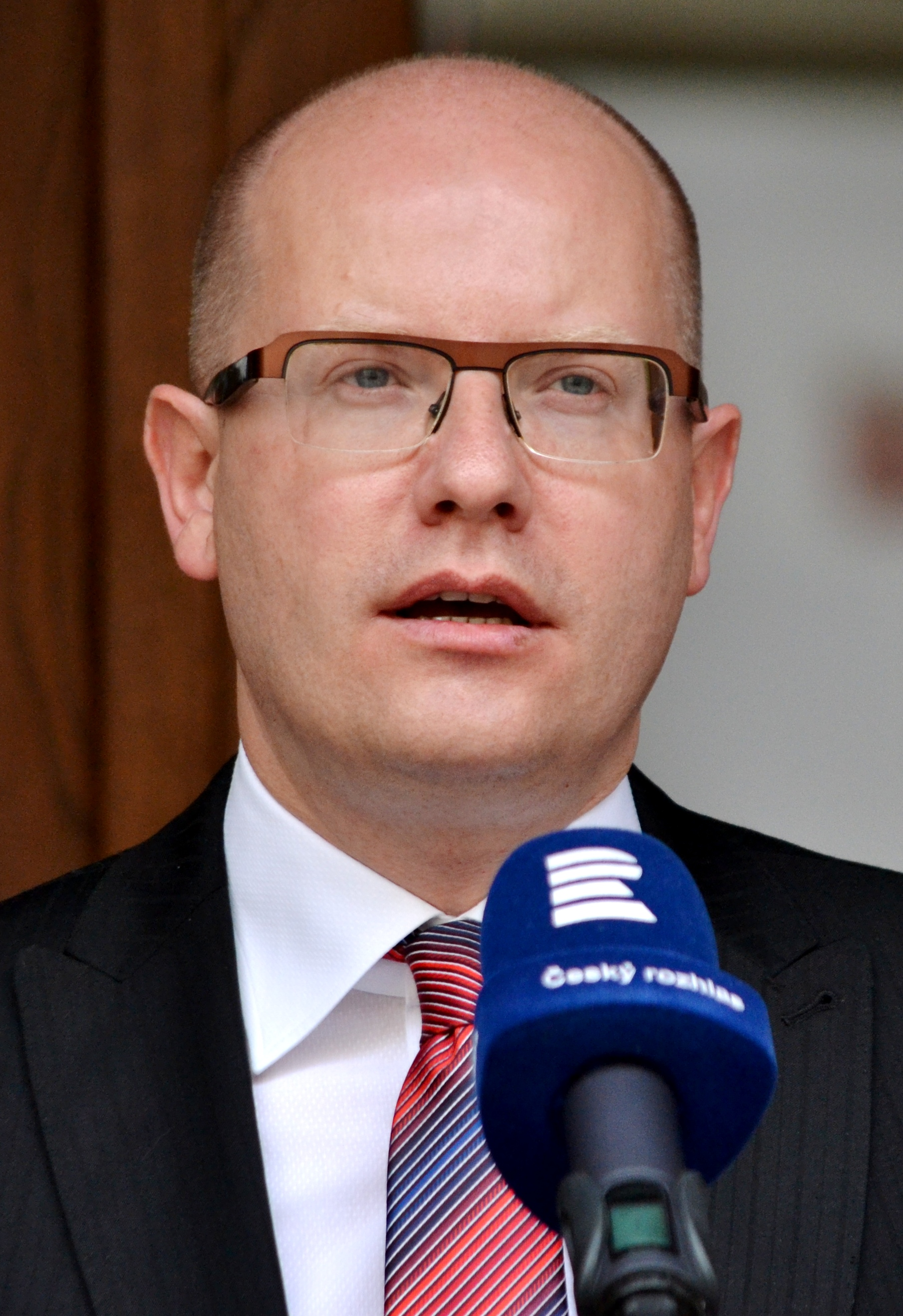
| Candidate | Bohuslav Sobotka |
| Electoral vote | 606 |
| Percentage | 87.7% |
Leader of ČSSD before election
Bohuslav Sobotka
Elected Leader of ČSSD
Bohuslav Sobotka

The Czech Social Democratic Party (ČSSD) leadership election of 2015 was held in March 2015. The incumbent leader and Prime Minister Bohuslav Sobotka was re-elected for another term. Sobotka was the only candidate. He received over 85% votes from delegates. 706 delegates were allowed to vote.

== Voting ==
| Bohuslav Sobotka | Against |
|---|---|
| 606 (87.7%) | 85 |
