= Martin Jahn =

Czech economist and politician

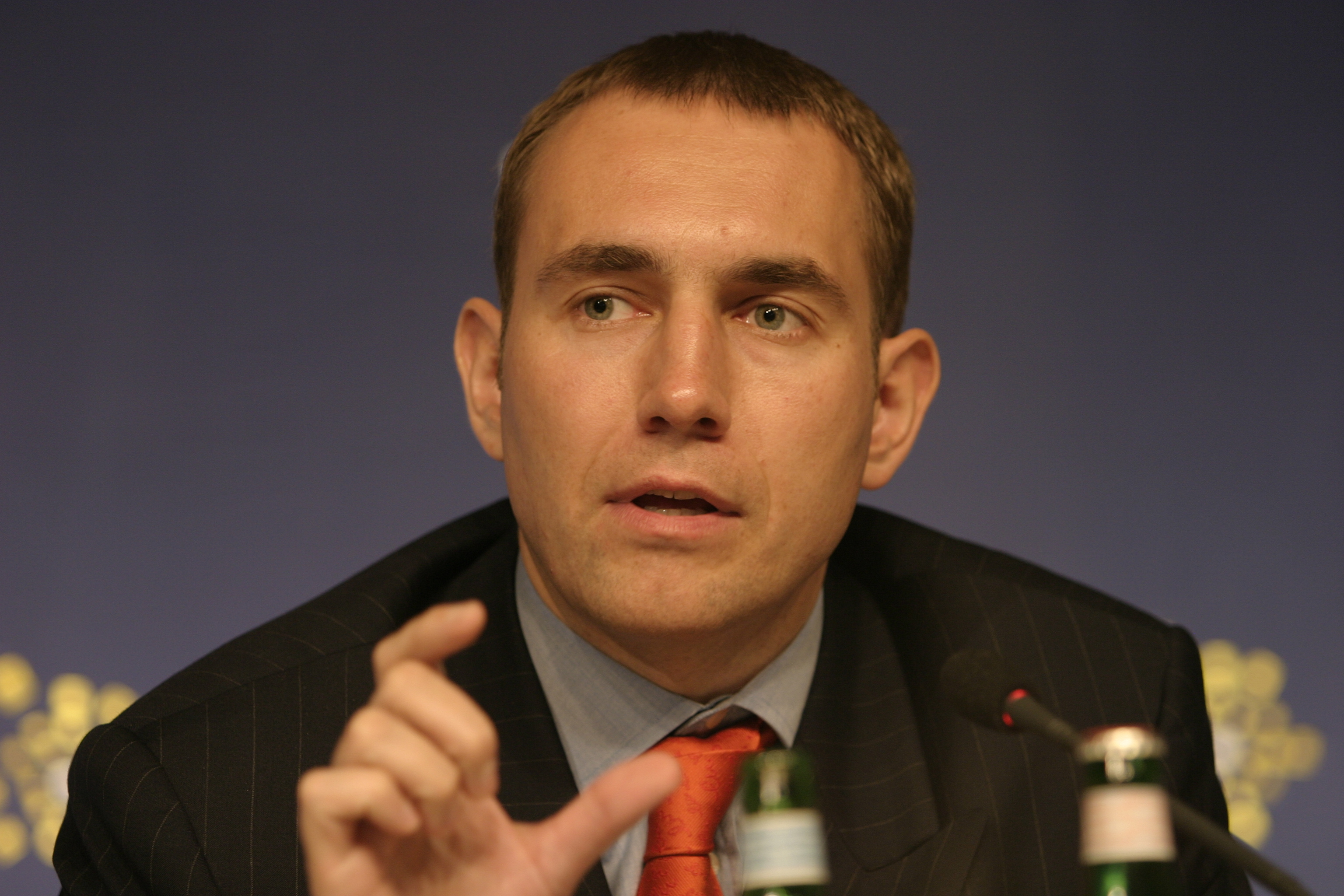

Deputy Prime minister for Economics
- In office 4 August 2004 – 31 December 2005
- Prime Minister: Stanislav Gross; Jiří Paroubek
- Preceded by: Established
- Succeeded by: Jiří Havel

Personal details
- Born: 21 January 1970 (age 56) Prague, Czechoslovakia
- Party: Independent (nominated by ČSSD) (2004-2005)
- Education: Prague University of Economics and Business
- Profession: Economist, top manager

Martin Jahn (born 21 January 1970) is a Czech economist, politician and top manager. He served as Deputy Prime Minister of the Czech Republic for Economic Policy from August 2004 to December 2005. Since 2006 he has been working in top management positions for Volkswagen Group in various countries.

== Career ==
He graduated from the Faculty of International Relations at the University of Economics, Prague and joined CzechInvest, a governmental agency supporting foreign companies to invest in the Czech Republic. In 1997, he started managing the organisation's office in Chicago, where he studied at DePaul University and received an MBA. In 1999, he became the CEO of CzechInvest. During his time at CzechInvest, the agency had attracted some of the major foreign direct investments, such as the new automotive plant TPCA in Kolin or several IT and shared service centers, such as IBM in Brno and DHL in Prague. Under his leadership, CzechInvest was awarded the European investment promotion agency award.

In the summer of 2004, Jahn was appointed as Deputy Prime Minister for economic policy in the government of Stanislav Gross. After Gross' resignation, Jahn remained in Jiří Paroubek's government at the same position. In May 2005, he proposed a new economic agenda, by which he claimed the Czech Republic could catch up with western countries of the European Union in eight years. The agenda included the liberalisation of the public finance sector and tax policy, and the introduction of fees at universities. In his government function he also served as a chairman of the Council for human resources development and the government council for the support of research, development and innovations. He modernized the government support system, including accelerated depreciation for company investments into R&D.

In 2006, Martin Jahn joined Volkswagen Group. After being the Škoda Auto Board Member for HR Management from 2006 to 2008, he was appointed Managing Director of Volkswagen Group NSC (national sales company) in Moscow, Russia where he was responsible for Group Brand Sales. From 2010 to 2016, he was the Managing Director of Volkswagen Group Fleet International in Wolfsburg, Germany where his key responsibility was to manage the Volkswagen Group's global corporate sales. In 2016, he moved to Changchun, China to take over as Executive Vice President for Sales & Marketing and Managing Director of the Volkswagen Brand at FAW-VW. With Martin Jahn as Vice President, FAW-VW has built a firm position in China's SUV market and successfully introduced and developed the Volkswagen brand's Jetta while promoting numerous business digitisation initiatives.

== Personal life ==
Jahn was made a member of the French Ordre National du Mérite. As well as his native Czech, he also speaks English, German, Russian and French. He is married to his wife Karolina since 1991 and together they have 4 daughters.
