= Cabinet of Vladimír Špidla =

Vladimír Špidla's cabinet
- 5th Cabinet of Czech Republic
- 15 July 2002 - 4 August 2004
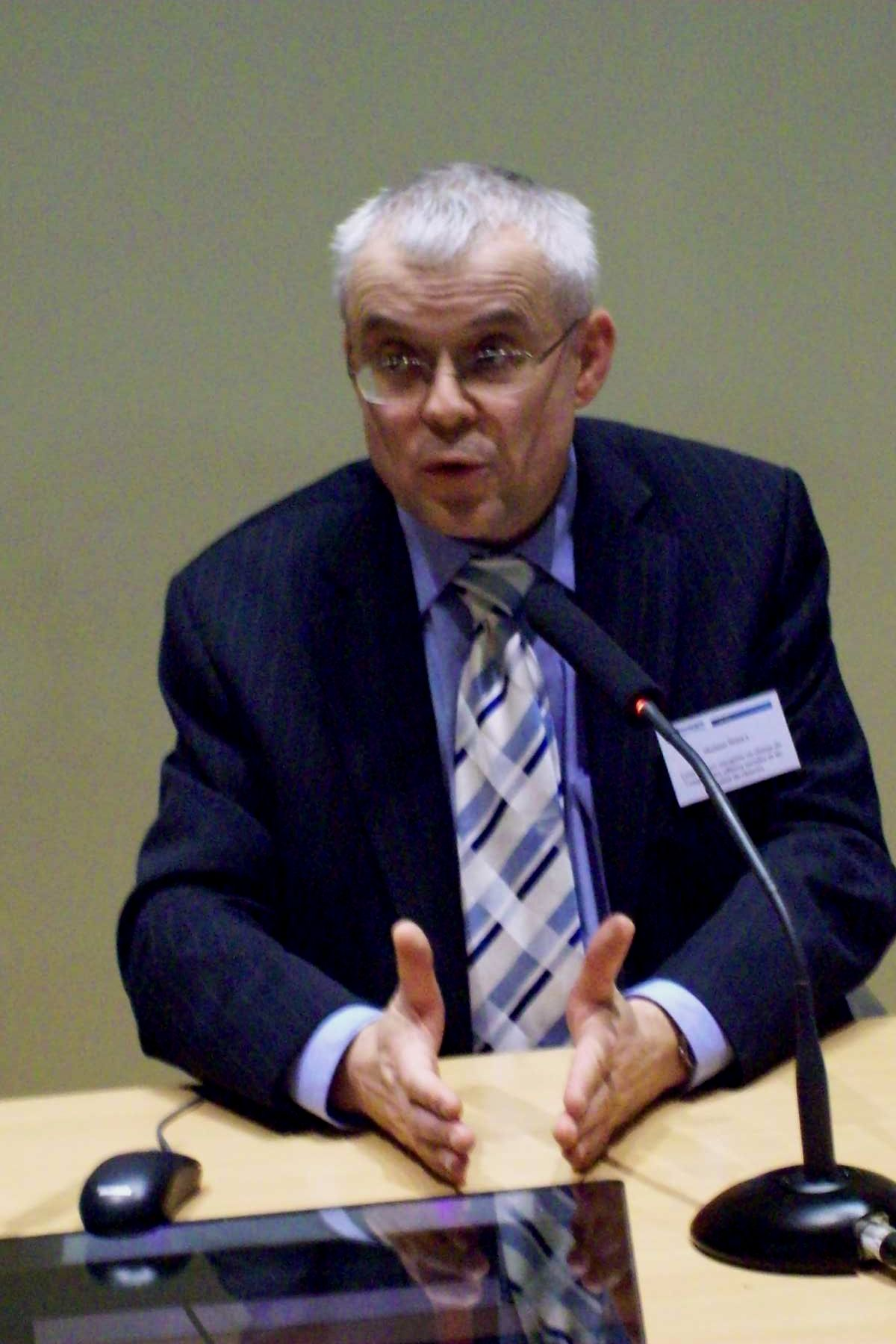
- Date formed: 15 July 2002
- Date dissolved: 4 August 2004

People and organisations
- Head of state: Václav Havel; Václav Klaus
- Head of government: Vladimír Špidla
- No. of ministers: 18
- Member party: ČSSD; KDU-ČSL; US-DEU
- Status in legislature: Majority government (Coalition)
- Opposition party: ODS; KSČM
- Opposition leader: Václav Klaus; Mirek Topolánek

History
- Incoming formation: 2002
- Outgoing formation: 2004
- Outgoing election: 2002 Czech legislative election
- Legislature term: 2002-2006
- Predecessor: Miloš Zeman's Cabinet
- Successor: Stanislav Gross' Cabinet

The Government of the Czech Republic from 15 July 2002 to 4 August 2004 was formed after 2002 legislative election. It was a coalition government of the Czech Social Democratic Party (ČSSD), the Christian and Democratic Union - Czechoslovak People's Party (KDU-ČSL) and the Freedom Union - Democratic Union (US-DEU).

Portfolio	Minister	Political party
Prime Minister	Vladimír Špidla	ČSSD
Deputy Prime Minister, Minister of Interior	Stanislav Gross	ČSSD
Deputy Prime Minister, Minister of Foreign Affairs	Cyril Svoboda	KDU-ČSL
Deputy Prime Minister	Pavel Rychetský	ČSSD
Deputy Prime Minister	Bohuslav Sobotka	ČSSD
Minister for Science and Research, Human rights and resources	Petr Mareš	US-DEU
Minister of Finance	Bohuslav Sobotka	ČSSD
Minister of Labour and social affairs	Zdeněk Škromach	ČSSD
Minister of Justice	Pavel Rychetský; Vladimír Špidla (acting); Karel Čermák; Vladimír Špidla (acting)	ČSSD
Minister of Transportation	Milan Šimonovský	KDU-ČSL
Minister of Regional development	Pavel Němec	US-DEU
Minister of the Environment	Libor Ambrozek	KDU-ČSL
Minister of Informatics	Vladimír Mlynář	US-DEU
Minister of Industry and Trade	Jiří Rusnok; Milan Urban	ČSSD
Minister of Health	Marie Součková; Jozef Kubinyi	ČSSD
Minister of Agriculture	Jaroslav Palas	ČSSD
Minister of Culture	Pavel Dostál	ČSSD
Minister of Defence	Jaroslav Tvrdík; Miroslav Kostelka	ČSSD
Minister of Education, Youth and Physical training	Petra Buzková	ČSSD
