= 2015 Czech vote of no confidence =

Czech Republic Government vote of No Confidence
26 May 2015
- Czech Constitution Provides That For Calling Off By The Vote of No Confidence To The Government Is Eligible 101 Votes in Chamber of Deputies.

Results
Choice	Votes	%
Yes	47	30.92%
No	105	69.08%
Valid votes	152	100.00%
Invalid or blank votes	0	0.00%
Total votes	152	100.00%
Registered voters/turnout	Members of Parliament	152%
- For calling on a vote of no confidence is necessary 52 signatures.

The Parliament of the Czech Republic vote of no confidence in the current Czech Republic government of the Prime Minister Bohuslav Sobotka was held on Tuesday 26 May 2015.

The vote was initiated because of opposition concerns about conflicts of interest on the part of Finance Minister Andrej Babiš.

The vote of no confidence was called by the three opposition political parties - ODS, TOP 09 and Úsvit (Dawn) on 21 May 2015 as step against Finance Minister of the Czech Republic Andrej Babiš.

== Result ==
The vote of no confidence to the Government was unsuccessful as only 47 legislators supported no confidence when 101 were needed. 105 Members of Parliament voted against no confidence and 32 MP's abstained. 16 legislators did not attend the meeting of the Chamber of Deputies.
