= Telnice (Brno-Country District) =

- Municipality
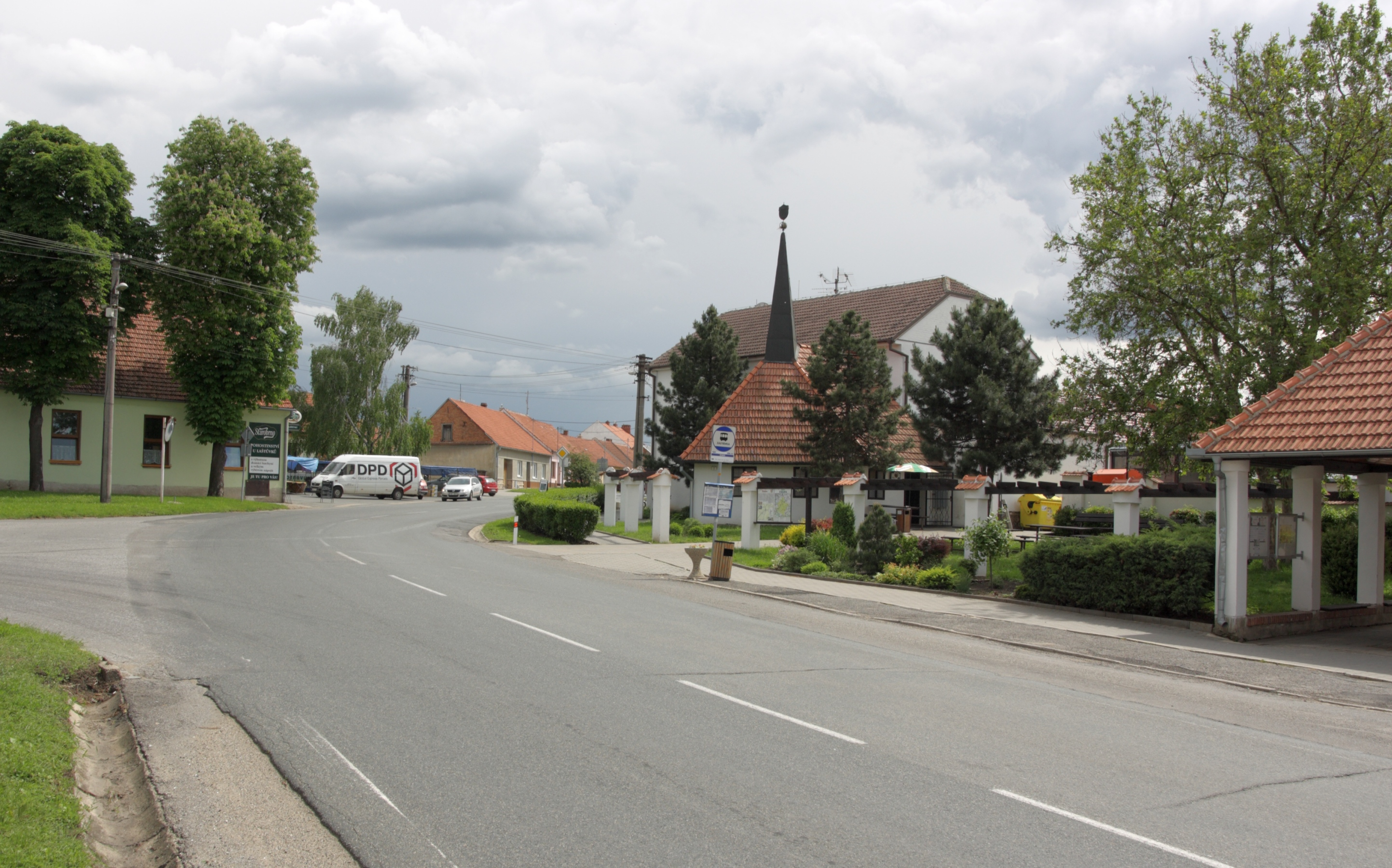
- The square Masarykovo náměstí

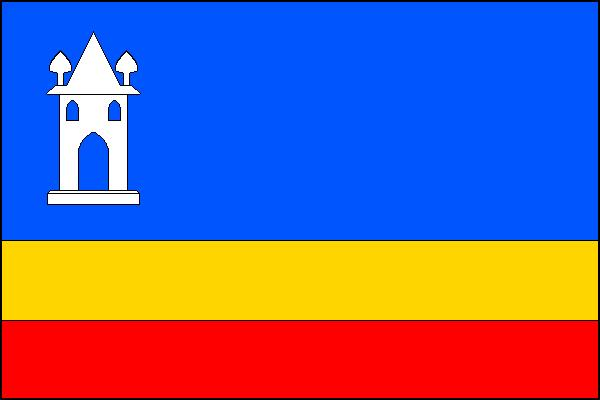
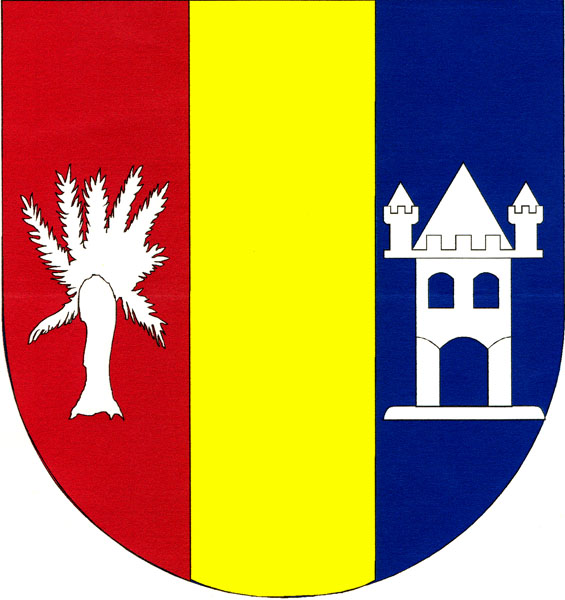
- Flag Coat of arms

- Location in the Czech Republic
- Coordinates: 49°6′7″N 16°43′4″E
- Country: Czech Republic
- Region: South Moravian
- District: Brno-Country
- First mentioned: 1244

Area
  - Total: 6.10 km^{2} (2.36 sq mi)
- Elevation: 195 m (640 ft)

Population (2026-01-01)
  - Total: 1,642
  - Density: 269/km^{2} (697/sq mi)
- Time zone: UTC+1 (CET)
  - Summer (DST): UTC+2 (CEST)
- Postal code: 664 59
- Website: www.telnice.cz

Telnice (German: Telnitz) is a municipality and village in Brno-Country District in the South Moravian Region of the Czech Republic. It has about 1,600 inhabitants.

== Geography ==
Telnice is located about 12 kilometres (7 mi) southeast of Brno. It lies in the Dyje–Svratka Valley. The Říčka River flows through the municipality.

== History ==
The first written mention of Telnice is from 1244.

Telnice was a battlefield of the Battle of Austerlitz on 2 December 1805. Austrians under Michael von Kienmayer and Russians under Dmitry Dokhturov and Friedrich Wilhelm von Buxhoeveden wrested the village from the French 3rd Line Infantry Regiment, lost it to a counterattack, and finally recaptured it. After the battle went against the allies farther north, they evacuated Telnice and retreated, suffering heavy losses in men and artillery pieces.

== Demographics ==
Historical population

Year	Pop.	±%
1869	619	—
1880	673	+8.7%
1890	737	+9.5%
1900	801	+8.7%
1910	824	+2.9%

Year	Pop.	±%
1921	888	+7.8%
1930	1,190	+34.0%
1950	1,200	+0.8%
1961	1,379	+14.9%
1970	1,343	−2.6%

Year	Pop.	±%
1980	1,305	−2.8%
1991	1,227	−6.0%
2001	1,263	+2.9%
2011	1,473	+16.6%
2021	1,642	+11.5%

Source: Censuses

== Transport ==
The municipality is served by the Sokolnice-Telnice train station, located on the railway line heading from Křenovice to Skalice nad Svitavou via Brno.

== Sights ==
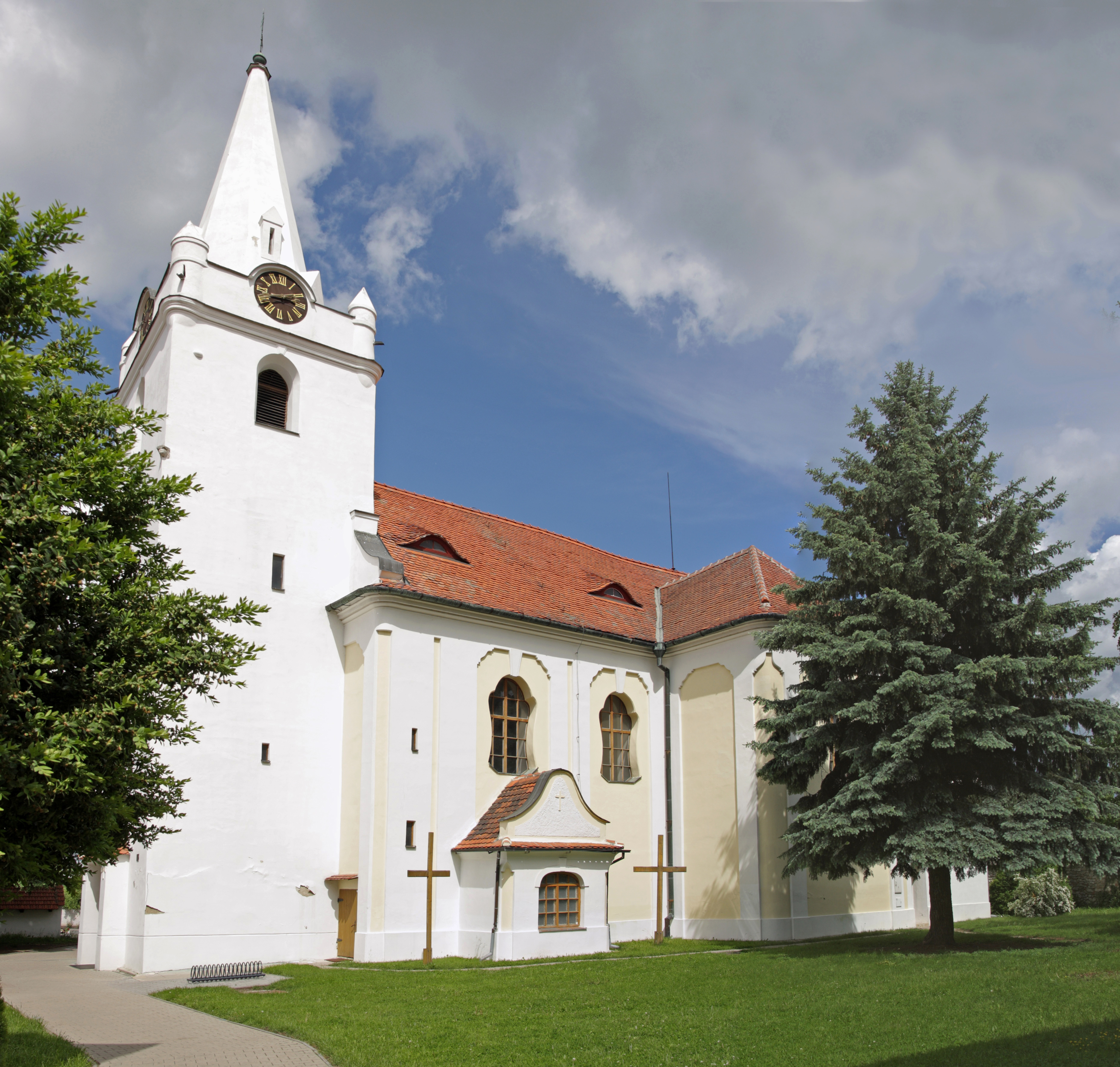
Church of Saint John the Baptist

The main landmark of Telnice is the Church of Saint John the Baptist. It was built in the Baroque style in 1726–1734 and has a Romanesque tower.

== Notable people ==
- Bohuslav Sobotka (born 1971), politician, prime minister of the Czech Republic in 2014–2017
