= Milada Emmerová =

Czech doctor and politician (born 1944)

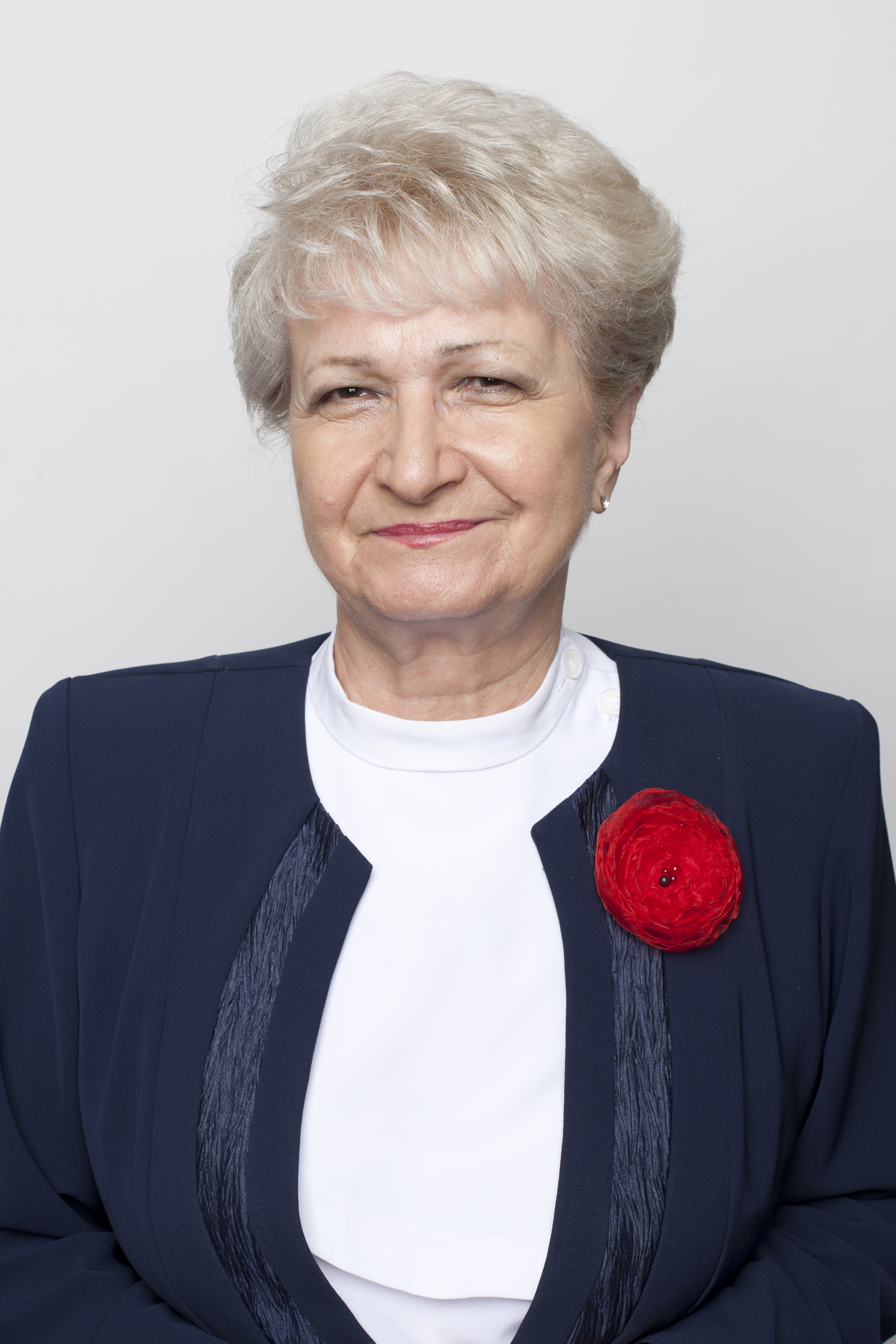

9th Minister of Health
- In office 4 August 2004 – 12 October 2005
- Prime Minister: Jiří Paroubek; Stanislav Gross
- Preceded by: Jozef Kubinyi
- Succeeded by: David Rath

2nd Governor of the Plzeň Region
- In office 14 November 2008 – 9 September 2010
- Preceded by: Petr Zimmermann
- Succeeded by: Milan Chovanec

Personal details
- Born: 4 November 1944 (age 81) Plzeň, Bohemia and Moravia (now Czech Republic)
- Party: ČSSD
- Education: Charles University
- Occupation: politician, doctor

Milada Emmerová (born 4 November 1944) is a Czech doctor, politician, former Minister of Health for the Czech Republic from 2004 to 2005, and the second Governor of the Plzeň Region from 2008 until 2010. As of April 2023, she is a member of the Czech Social Democratic Party (ČSSD) and a senator of Senate of the Parliament of the Czech Republic since 2012.

== Personal life ==
Born in Plzeň, Emmerová was married (1966–1982) to Jiří Emmer, and had two children Jiří Emmer (born 1967), who became a doctor, and Helena Emmerová (born 1979). She later divorced Jiří Emmer.

== Medical career ==
Emmerová completed her medical degree at Charles University in 1967. She practiced internal medicine in Plzeň rising to the rank of supervising physician in 1978. In the 1990s she became a consultant and lectured throughout the country. Since 2000 she has been a member of the New York Academy of Sciences. As of 2006 she remained on the faculty of the teaching hospital in Plzeň. In June 2006 she was appointed to the board of the Czech Universal Health Insurance Company (VZP).

== Political career ==
Originally a member of the Communist Party of Czechoslovakia (KSČ), she joined the Czech Social Democratic Party (ČSSD) in 1994. Elected in the Czech election of 1996 and 1998 to the Chamber of Deputies, she served on the Health committee, first as a member and then starting after her reelection in 2002, as chairwoman. In 2004 in the government of Stanislav Gross, she was appointed as Minister of Health, succeeding Jozef Kubinyi. When Gross resigned, she was reappointed by Jiří Paroubek. In a 2004 by-election she ran for the Senate from Plzeň, but lost to the ODS candidate. During her tenure as Minister of Health she created hospital ombudsmen to expedite the handling of patient complaints. However, during her tenure health care costs continued to rise dramatically. She was removed as Minister of Health on 12 August 2005.

In 2008 she was elected to the regional assembly for the Plzeň Region (Zastupitelstvo Plzeňského kraje) and later as governor of that region. In the 2010 by-elections for parliament, she was elected to the Chamber of Deputies and resigned as governor. She served from 29 May 2010 to the end of the term on 20 October 2012. In 2012 she again ran for the Senate as a ČSSD candidate and was elected for a six-year term. She is the vice-chair of the Senate's Committee on Health and Social Policy.

Government offices
Preceded by Jozef Kubinyi	Minister of Health of the Czech Republic; 2004–2005	Succeeded by David Rath
