= František Bublan =

Czech dissident (born 1951)

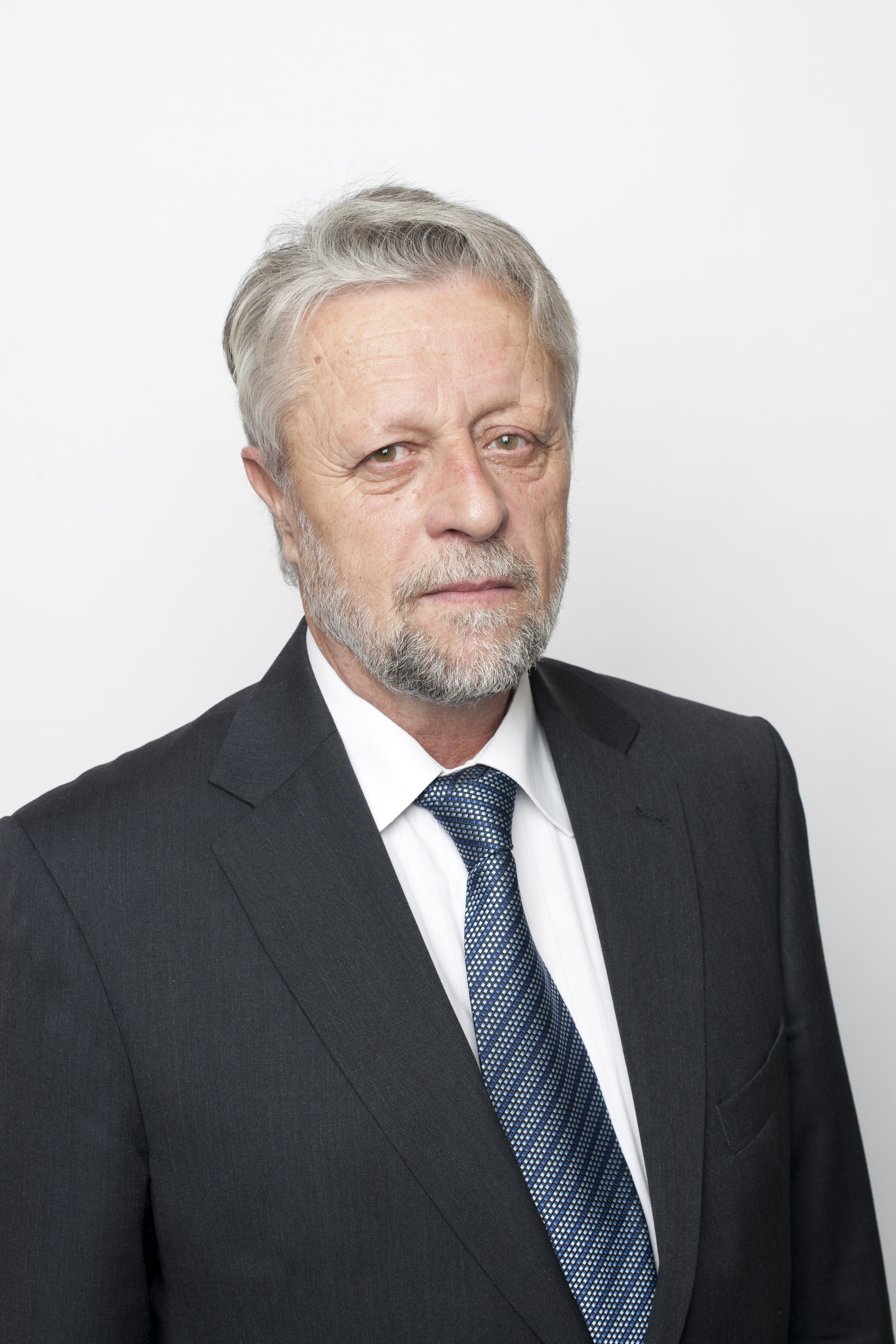
- František Bublan in 2012

6th Minister of the Interior
- In office 4 August 2004 – 4 September 2006
- Prime Minister: Stanislav Gross; Jiří Paroubek
- Preceded by: Stanislav Gross
- Succeeded by: Ivan Langer

4th Senator from Třebíč
- In office 20 October 2012 – 20 October 2018
- Preceded by: Vítězslav Jonáš
- Succeeded by: Hana Žáková

Member of the Chamber of Deputies
- In office 3 June 2006 – 20 October 2012

Personal details
- Born: January 13, 1951 (age 75) Třebíč, Czechoslovakia
- Party: Independent (nominated by Social Democratic Party) (2004–2018)

František Bublan (born 13 January 1951 in Třebíč) is a former Czech dissident, who was in 2004 named Minister of the Interior for Stanislav Gross's Social Democratic Party government. After Stanislav Gross was forced to leave the government, Bublan remained in the government of Jiří Paroubek.

He studied at Charles University, faculty of Catholic Theology. He briefly worked as a cleric, but after signing Charter 77, he had to work in menial jobs.

Government offices
Preceded by Stanislav Gross	Minister of the Interior of the Czech Republic; 2004–2006	Succeeded by Ivan Langer
