= CEVRO =

Czech think tank

- Founded: August 1999
- Founder: Ivan Langer
- Type: association
- Purpose: Political education and transmission of Liberal conservative ideas to public
- Location: Prague, Czech Republic
- Employees: 12
- Website: http://www.cevro.cz (in Czech)

CEVRO is a think-tank affiliated with the Civic Democratic Party (ODS), a political party in the Czech Republic. It was established in 1999 by Ivan Langer.

According to Ivan Langer, the main goal of CEVRO is to improve political culture, education in social sciences and support of democracy and freedom around the world.

== CEVRO Institute ==
On September 15, 2005, CEVRO established its own private university, the CEVRO Institute, providing social science education at BA and MA levels and several professional post-graduate programs. It is focused on education and research in the area of social sciences and public policy. Educational programmes include political science, international relations, law, economics, and public administration.

== Management ==
- Management Board
  - Ivan Langer, Chairman
  - Jiří Frgal
  - Ladislav Mrklas
  - Jan Zahradil
- Supervisory Board
  - Oldřich Vlasák, Chairman
  - Roman Brncal
  - Jaroslav Salivar
- Executive Team
  - Director: Jiří Kozák
  - Project Manager: Anežka Fuchsová
  - Project Manager - Coordinator of the Liberal-Conservative Academy: Lucie Buchtíková
  - Coordinator of the Liberal-Conservative Academy: Daniel Bielczyk
  - Political Marketing Coordinator: Marek Buchta
  - Project Manager: Lukáš Rieger
  - Project Manager: Petra Jišová
  - Project Egypt: Mohamed Saad

== Activities ==
=== Political education ===
The academy's political education activities consist of three programmes:

- education of ODS members, with an aim of improving the expertise, good governance and communication preparedness within the party.
- Women and Politics, a programme aimed at increasing the participation of women in Czech politics.
- the Liberal Conservative Academy, a one-year interdisciplinary study program of economics, international relations, political science, political marketing, law, communications and public presentations. Graduates receive a Liberal Conservative Academy Diploma.

=== Democracy Assistance ===
CEVRO participates in programmes to support democracy abroad, including the transition of Egypt to democracy, and annual trips to Prague for democracy activists from countries such as Belarus, Cuba and Burma.
