= Ivan Langer =

Czech politician

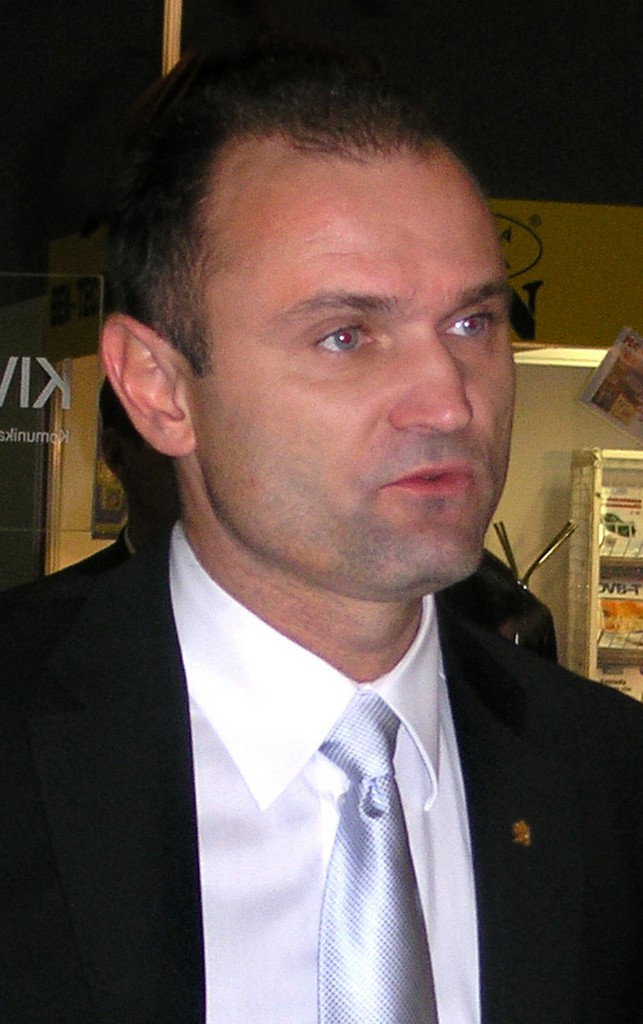

Minister of the Interior
- In office 2006 – 8 May 2009
- Prime Minister: Mirek Topolánek
- Preceded by: František Bublan
- Succeeded by: Martin Pecina

Personal details
- Born: January 1, 1967 (age 59) Olomouc, Czechoslovakia
- Party: Civic Democratic Party
- Education: Palacký University, Olomouc

Ivan Langer (born 1 January 1967 in Olomouc) is a former Czech politician. He has been a member of the Civic Democratic Party (ODS) since 1991. From 1996 to 2010 he was a member of the Chamber of Deputies (in 1996-2006 a vice-chairman), serving as Minister of Informatics and Minister of the Interior.

== Early life and education ==
Langer graduated from the Medical Faculty of Palacky University in Olomouc and the Law Faculty at Charles University in Prague.

== Political career ==
In 1989 he was a student at Palacky University, and a member of the State Student Strike Committee. He joined ODS in 1991. From 1996 to 2010 he was a member of the Chamber of Deputies of the Czech Republic, and from 1998 to 2006 he was a vice-chairman of the Chamber. From 2006 to 2007 he was the Minister of Informatics, and from 2006 to 2009 he was the Minister of the Interior.

As a politician Ivan Langer focused on public administration and drug policy, co-authoring the book Rational Drug Policy.

Langer now serves as the chairman of the board of several institutions: the CEVRO think tank, which he founded, the private CEVRO Institute, Safe Olomouc Foundation, the Olomouc Fortress Museum, the Policemen and Firemen Foundation, and Children's Road Safety Foundation. From 1999 he was a founding member of the Palacky University board. His term ended in 2013.

== Personal life ==
Langer is married to Markéta Langerová. They have three children.
