= 2006 Czech parliamentary election =

- 2–3 June 2006

All 200 seats in the Chamber of Deputies 101 seats needed for a majority
- Turnout: 64.42% (▲6.47pp)
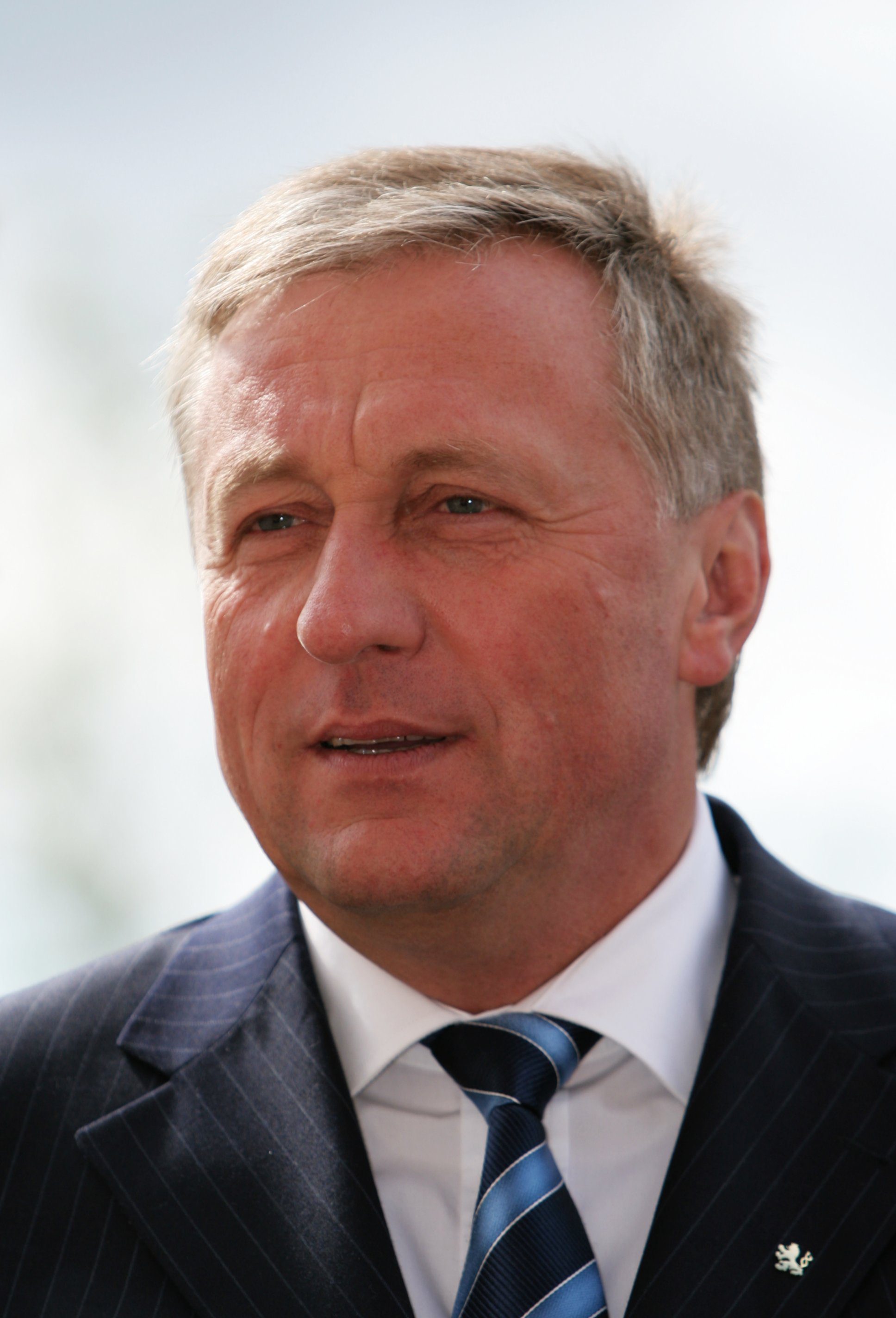

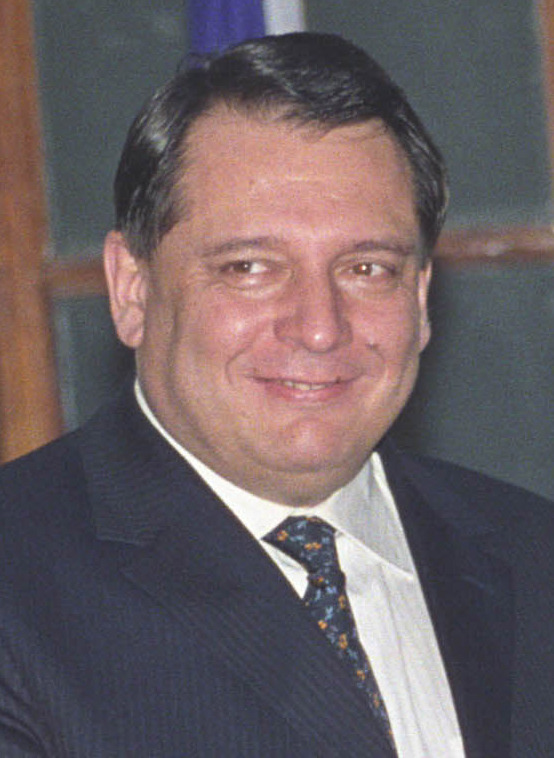

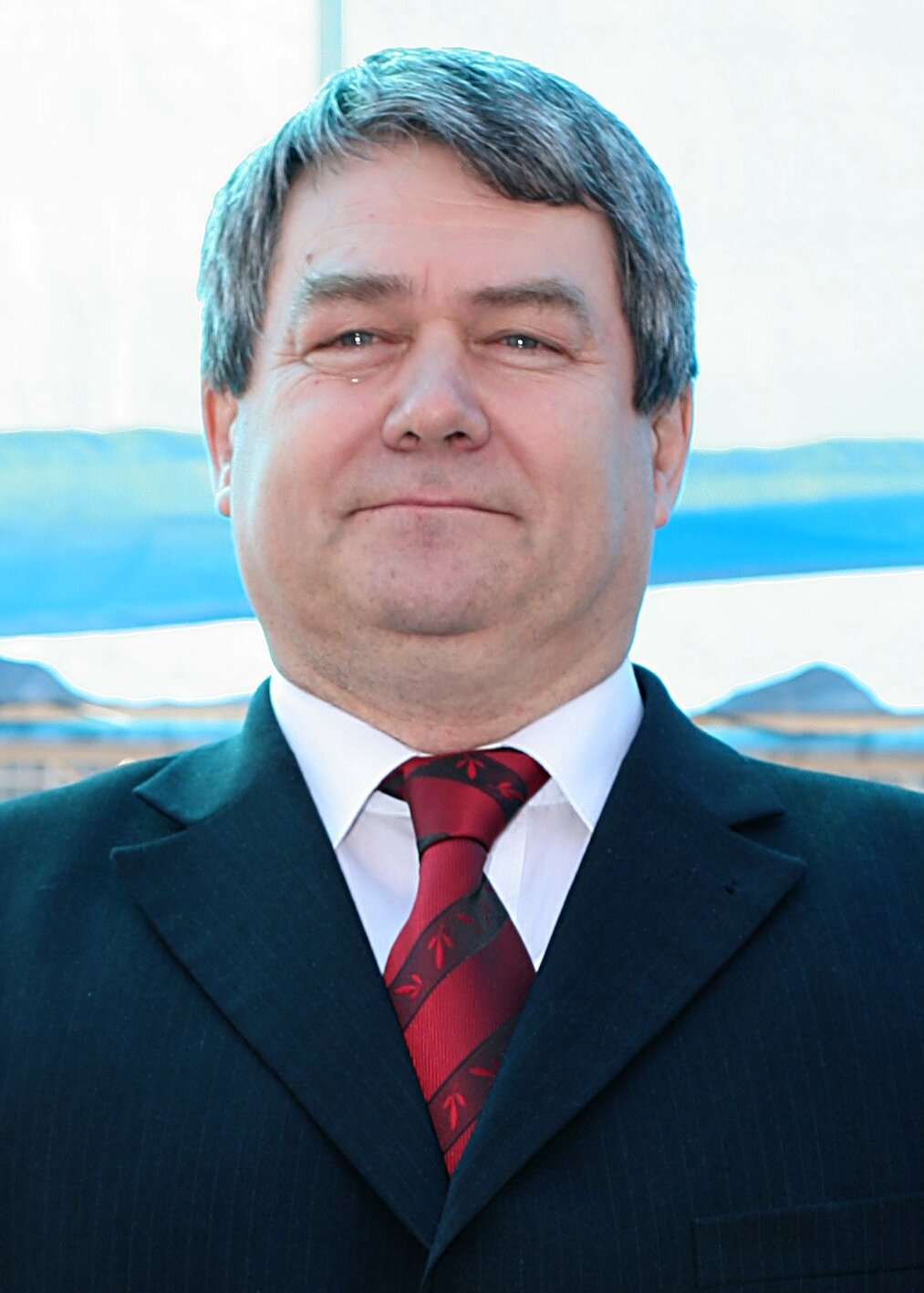

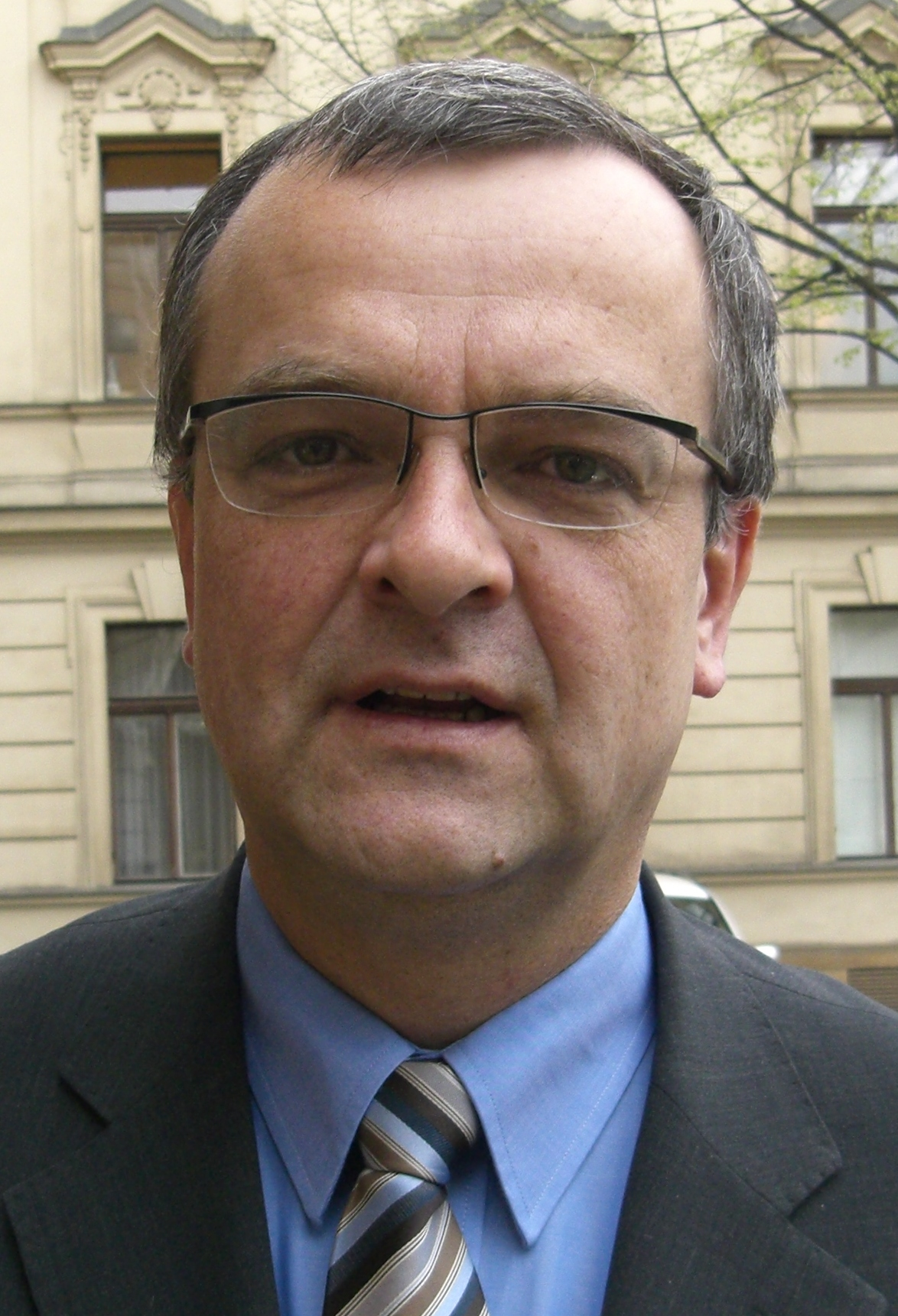

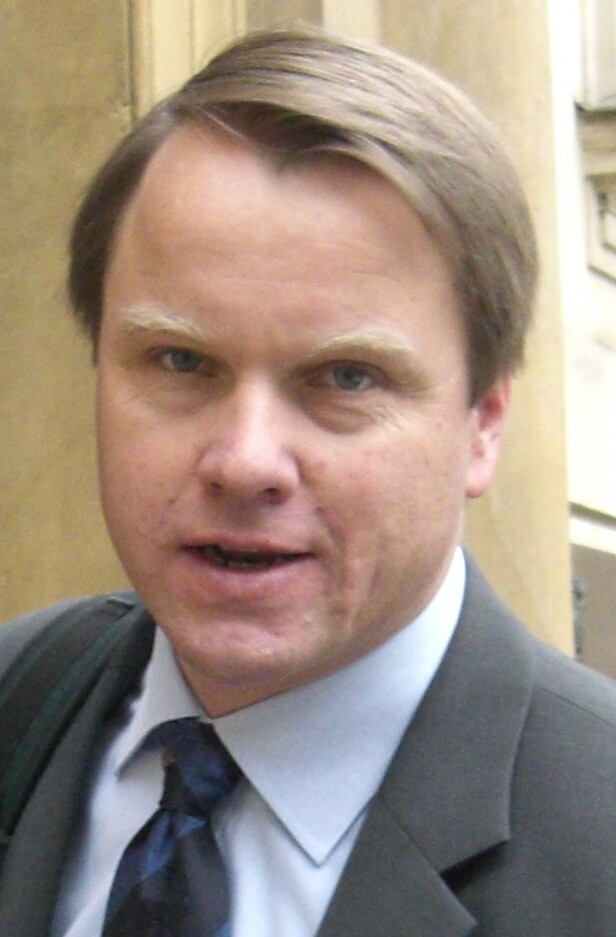
	First party	Second party	Third party
Leader	Mirek Topolánek	Jiří Paroubek	Vojtěch Filip
Party	ODS	ČSSD	KSČM
Last election	24.48%, 58 seats	30.21%, 70 seats	18.51%, 41 seats
Seats won	81	74	26
Seat change	▲23	▲4	▼15
Popular vote	1,892,475	1,728,827	685,328
Percentage	35.38%	32.32%	12.81%
	Fourth party	Fifth party
Leader	Miroslav Kalousek	Martin Bursík
Party	KDU-ČSL	Greens
Last election	14.28%, 31 seats	2.37%, 0 seats
Seats won	13	6
Seat change	▼18	▲6
Popular vote	386,706	336,487
Percentage	7.23%	6.29%
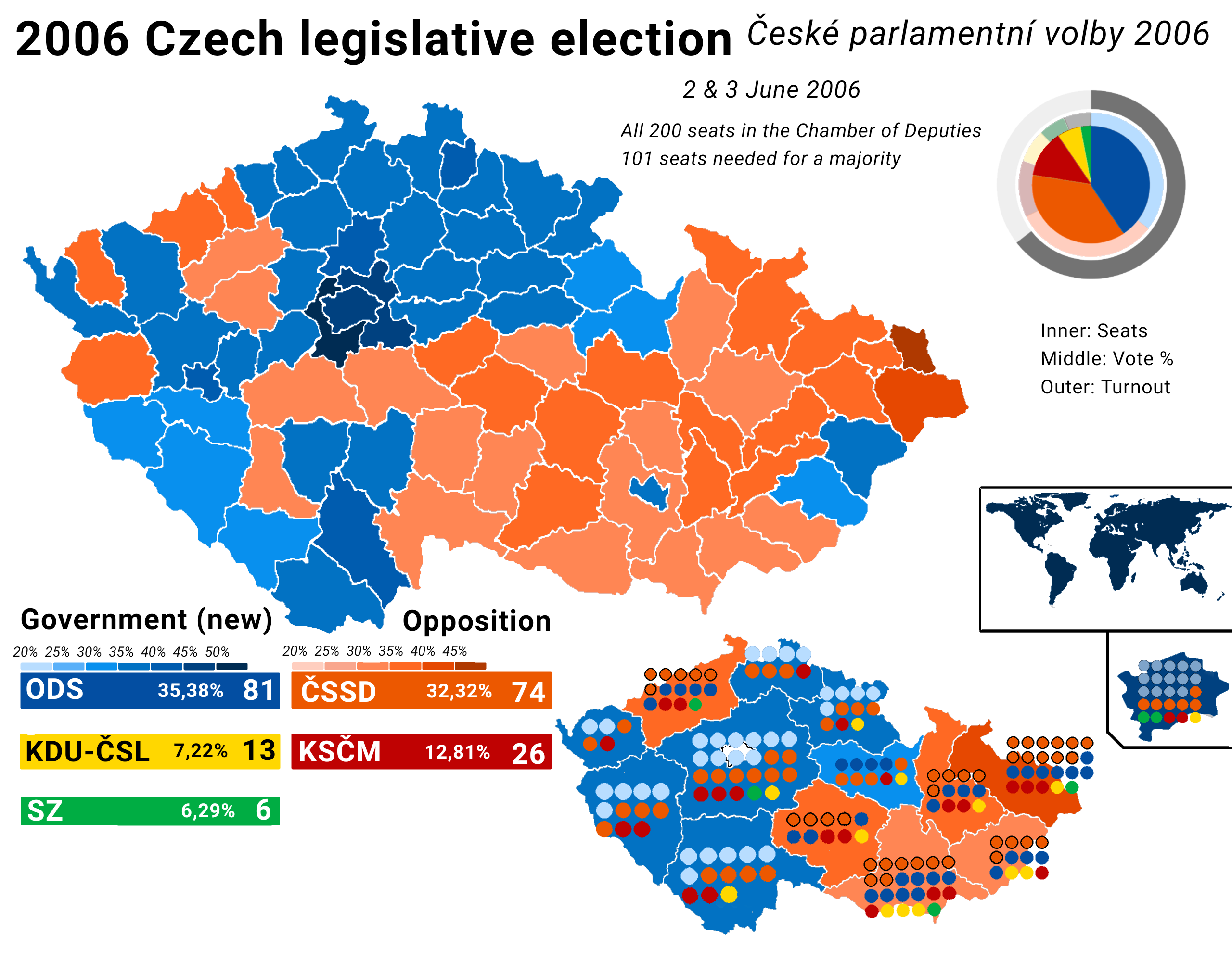
Prime Minister before election
Jiří Paroubek
ČSSD
Prime Minister after election
Mirek Topolánek
ODS

Parliamentary elections were held in the Czech Republic on 2 and 3 June 2006 to elect the members of the Chamber of Deputies.

A major scandal broke out a few days before the elections when a classified report by Jan Kubice, the head of the anti-organised crime unit, was leaked to the media, accusing the ruling Social Democratic Party (ČSSD) of corruption and interference in police investigations. The Civic Democratic Party (ODS) and the Social Democratic Party, the two largest parties, obtained their highest percentage of votes ever. Turnout increased from the previous parliamentary elections in 2002.

The elections produced an evenly balanced result. One potential coalition – the Civic Democratic Party, Christian Democrats (KDU-ČSL) and Greens – won exactly half of the 200 seats, while the Social Democratic Party and the Communists (KSČM) held the other half, meaning that either coalition would struggle to pass legislation.

Following the elections, 230 days passed without a new government being formed. Eventually, a coalition government formed of the Civic Democratic Party, KDU-ČSL and the Greens passed a confidence vote on 19 January 2007, when two Social Democrat deputies abstained.

== Campaign ==
Several weeks before the elections, police officer Jan Kubice, head of the squad for investigating organised crime, suggested that senior figures from the police and the government were trying to cover up their cooperation with organised crime. He was summoned before a parliament commission a few days before the election where he presented a document; the contents of the document were leaked immediately.

The document suggested that former Prime Minister Stanislav Gross had connections with the criminal underground and hinted that Prime Minister Jiří Paroubek dealt with the mafia. It also contained information about minor officials, some of whom had already been imprisoned for bribery.

Paroubek and the others denied these claims and accused the opposition Civic Democratic Party of trying to manufacture a scandal to help them in the elections. After the elections, Paroubek said that the allegations cost his party, the Social Democratic Party, victory and that democracy was in as much danger as in 1948, when the Communists seized power. He raised the possibility of challenging the election result, though this did not happen.

=== Campaign finances ===
Party	ČSSD	ODS	KDU-ČSL	KSČM	SZ	US-DEU
Money Spent	120,000,000 Kč	80,000,000 KČ	43,000,000 Kč	22,000,000 Kč	13,000,000 Kč	11,000,000 Kč

== Electoral system ==
The Chamber of Deputies consists of 200 members elected for a four-year term. Seats were allocated by proportional representation between those lists that gained over 5% of the national total of valid votes cast.

Party lists were presented in 14 regions, with votes cast for a list, although voters were allowed up to two preference votes for candidates on that list.

The Czech Republic has a parliamentary system of government, with ministers being responsible to the Chamber of Deputies. The Chamber is the most powerful organ of the state with power to override vetoes by the President and the Senate.

== Opinion polls ==
Date	Polling Firm	ODS	ČSSD	KSČM	KDU-ČSL	SZ	US-DEU	NEZDEM	SNK-ED	NEZ	Others
2-3 Jun 2006	Election	35.3	32.3	12.8	7.2	6.3	0.3	0.7	2.1	0.6	2.4
25–26 May 2006	SC&C	30.8	24.2	12.1	5.8	8.6	—N/a	—N/a	—N/a	—N/a	
22 May 2006	Median	19.0	20.0	12.2	6.0	8.9	—N/a	—N/a	—N/a	—N/a	
18–24 May 2006	Factum Invenio	27.8	28.5	17.3	9.0	8.6	1.1	—N/a	1.5	—N/a	3.0
19 May 2006	CVVM	32.0	28.0	15.5	5.5	10.5	0.5	1.0	2.5	2.0	2.5
12 May 2006	Factum Invenio	29.0	22.8	16.7	11.3	9.8	—N/a	—N/a	—N/a	—N/a	—N/a
9. May 2006	STEM	26.7	25.2	13.0	5.4	7.1	0.3	0.2	0.9	0.4	—N/a
19 April 2006	STEM	26.8	21.3	13.3	4.9	10.6	0.5	—N/a	1.1	0.5	—N/a
18 April 2006	Factum Invenio	29.5	23.6	18.1	12.3	10.0	—N/a	—N/a	—N/a	—N/a	—N/a
13 April 2006	SC&C	24.0	15.0	11.0	4.0	10.0	—N/a	—N/a	—N/a	—N/a	35.0
3 April 2006	Factum Invenio	29.3	25.3	17.6	9.9	10.5	2.2	0.6	0.8	1.7	2.1
24 March 2006	CVVM	25.5	21.0	12.5	6.5	10.0	—N/a	—N/a	—N/a	—N/a	24.5
17 March 2006	STEM	26.7	21.8	12.4	6.1	9.4	0.3	0.1	1.0	0.8	21.6
16 February 2006	STEM	28.6	24.5	15.3	6.4	5.6	0.3	0.2	0.5	1.0	15.6
2 February 2006	CVVM	36.0	35.0	14.5	8.0	3.0	1.0	—N/a	—N/a	1.0	1.5
18 January 2006	STEM	28.6	27.2	13.2	6.7	3.4	0.5	0.3	1.0	0.8	18.3

== Results ==
The election produced a deadlock, leaving all the coalitions which were considered likely before the election (ODS-KDU-ČSL-Greens; ČSSD-KSČM; ČSSD-KDU-ČSL-Greens) with less than the 101 votes required to pass legislation or to pass a confidence vote for the new cabinet in the Chamber of Deputies (100, 100 and 93 votes, respectively). Remaining possibilities included a grand coalition of the Civic Democratic Party and the Social Democratic Party, which would command a large majority, totalling 155 seats against 45; a minority cabinet of either of the 100-vote coalitions, which would have negotiate with the opposition to get the majority required for a confidence vote or to pass any legislation; or fresh elections.

On 26 June, the Civic Democratic Party, KDU-ČSL and the Greens announced that they had agreed on a coalition.

Party	Votes	%	Seats	+/–
Civic Democratic Party	1,892,475	35.38	81	+23
Czech Social Democratic Party	1,728,827	32.32	74	+4
Communist Party of Bohemia and Moravia	685,328	12.81	26	–15
KDU-ČSL	386,706	7.23	13	–10
Green Party	336,487	6.29	6	+6
SNK European Democrats	111,724	2.09	0	0
Independent Democrats	36,708	0.69	0	New
Independents	33,030	0.62	0	New
Party of Common Sense	24,828	0.46	0	0
Right Bloc	20,382	0.38	0	0
Freedom Union – Democratic Union	16,457	0.31	0	–8
Law and Justice	12,756	0.24	0	New
Moravané	12,552	0.23	0	New
Equal Opportunities Party	10,879	0.20	0	New
National Party	9,341	0.17	0	New
Coalition for the Czech Republic (KAN–SP-DEU-HNPD)	8,140	0.15	0	0
Koruna Česká	7,293	0.14	0	New
Balbín's Poetic Party	6,897	0.13	0	0
4 VIZE	3,109	0.06	0	New
Czech National Socialist Party	1,387	0.03	0	New
Helax-Ostrava se bavi	1,375	0.03	0	New
Humanist Party	857	0.02	0	New
Folklore and Society	574	0.01	0	New
Czech Right	395	0.01	0	0
Liberal Reform Party	253	0.00	0	New
National Unity	216	0.00	0	New
Total	5,348,976	100.00	200	0
Valid votes	5,348,976	99.64		
Invalid/blank votes	19,519	0.36		
Total votes	5,368,495	100.00		
Registered voters/turnout	8,333,305	64.42		
Source: Nohlen & Stöver

=== Vote share by district ===
ODS

ČSSD

KSČM

KDU-ČSL

SZ

=== By region ===
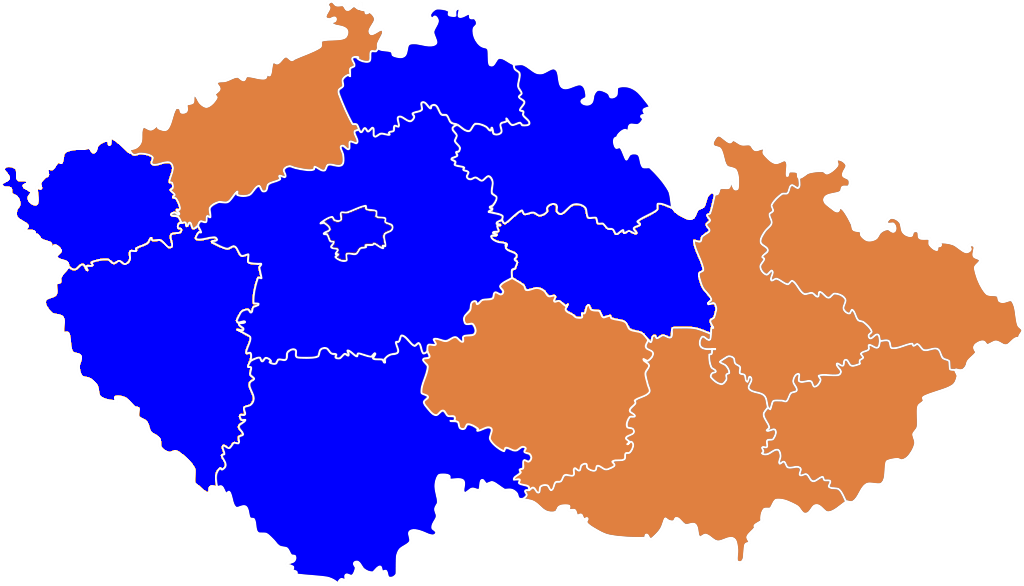
Winning parties by region

==== Prague ====
Party	Votes	%	Seats
Civic Democratic Party	317,224	48.32	14
Czech Social Democratic Party	152,962	23.30	6
Green Party	60,384	9.20	2
Communist Party of Bohemia and Moravia	51,925	7.91	2
KDU-ČSL	31,820	4.85	1
SNK European Democrats	23,386	3.56	0
Other parties	18,794	2.86	0
Total	656,495	100.00	25

==== Central Bohemian Region ====
Party	Votes	%	Seats
Civic Democratic Party	243,012	39.19	10
Czech Social Democratic Party	190,607	30.74	8
Communist Party of Bohemia and Moravia	79,964	12.90	3
Green Party	37,219	6.00	1
KDU-ČSL	30,207	4.87	1
SNK European Democrats	13,055	2.11	0
Other parties	25,983	4.19	0
Total	620,047	100.00	23

==== South Bohemian Region ====
Party	Votes	%	Seats
Civic Democratic Party	123,804	36.69	6
Czech Social Democratic Party	102,833	30.48	4
Communist Party of Bohemia and Moravia	45,099	13.37	2
KDU-ČSL	27,630	8.19	1
Green Party	19,924	5.91	0
Other parties	18,097	5.36	0
Total	337,387	100.00	13

==== Plzeň Region ====
Party	Votes	%	Seats
Civic Democratic Party	105,391	36.46	5
Czech Social Democratic Party	91,606	31.69	4
Communist Party of Bohemia and Moravia	40,578	14.04	2
Green Party	17,090	5.91	0
KDU-ČSL	16,338	5.65	0
Other parties	18,046	6.24	0
Total	289,049	100.00	11

==== Karlovy Vary Region ====
Party	Votes	%	Seats
Civic Democratic Party	49,189	35.87	2
Czech Social Democratic Party	44,887	32.74	2
Communist Party of Bohemia and Moravia	20,323	14.82	1
Green Party	9,206	6.71	0
KDU-ČSL	4,723	3.44	0
Other parties	8,789	6.41	0
Total	137,117	100.00	5

==== Ústí nad Labem Region ====
Party	Votes	%	Seats
Czech Social Democratic Party	132,895	35.46	6
Civic Democratic Party	130,365	34.79	5
Communist Party of Bohemia and Moravia	60,175	16.06	2
Green Party	22,616	6.04	1
KDU-ČSL	8,365	2.23	0
Other parties	20,320	5.42	0
Total	374,736	100.00	14

==== Liberec Region ====
Party	Votes	%	Seats
Civic Democratic Party	83,647	38.81	4
Czech Social Democratic Party	63,181	29.32	3
Communist Party of Bohemia and Moravia	24,823	11.52	1
Green Party	20,646	9.58	0
KDU-ČSL	9,131	4.24	0
Other parties	14,082	6.53	0
Total	215,510	100.00	8

==== Hradec Králové Region ====
Party	Votes	%	Seats
Civic Democratic Party	111,466	37.67	5
Czech Social Democratic Party	89,204	30.14	4
Communist Party of Bohemia and Moravia	34,093	11.52	1
KDU-ČSL	19,893	6.72	1
Green Party	19,819	6.70	0
SNK European Democrats	9,126	3.08	0
Other parties	12,330	4.17	0
Total	295,931	100.00	11

==== Pardubice Region ====
Party	Votes	%	Seats
Civic Democratic Party	91,113	33.26	4
Czech Social Democratic Party	90,268	32.95	4
Communist Party of Bohemia and Moravia	33,956	12.40	1
KDU-ČSL	24,023	8.77	1
Green Party	17,148	6.26	0
SNK European Democrats	6,641	2.42	0
Other parties	10,772	3.93	0
Total	273,921	100.00	10

==== Vysočina Region ====
Party	Votes	%	Seats
Czech Social Democratic Party	97,568	35.35	4
Civic Democratic Party	76,393	27.68	3
Communist Party of Bohemia and Moravia	40,480	14.67	2
KDU-ČSL	33,587	12.17	1
Green Party	13,514	4.90	0
SNK European Democrats	5,525	2.00	0
Other parties	8,930	3.24	0
Total	275,997	100.00	10

==== South Moravian Region ====
Party	Votes	%	Seats
Czech Social Democratic Party	200,619	32.95	8
Civic Democratic Party	186,779	30.68	8
Communist Party of Bohemia and Moravia	83,687	13.75	3
KDU-ČSL	67,865	11.15	3
Green Party	37,771	6.20	1
Other parties	32,083	5.27	0
Total	608,804	100.00	23

==== Olomouc Region ====
Party	Votes	%	Seats
Czech Social Democratic Party	118,334	35.45	5
Civic Democratic Party	101,151	30.30	4
Communist Party of Bohemia and Moravia	49,026	14.69	2
KDU-ČSL	27,609	8.27	1
Green Party	18,398	5.51	0
Other parties	19,331	5.79	0
Total	333,849	100.00	12

==== Zlín Region ====
Party	Votes	%	Seats
Czech Social Democratic Party	106,481	33.28	5
Civic Democratic Party	101,376	31.69	4
KDU-ČSL	41,663	13.02	2
Communist Party of Bohemia and Moravia	35,998	11.25	1
Green Party	16,224	5.07	0
Other parties	18,191	5.69	0
Total	319,933	100.00	12

==== Moravian-Silesian Region ====
Party	Votes	%	Seats
Czech Social Democratic Party	247,382	40.54	11
Civic Democratic Party	171,565	28.12	7
Communist Party of Bohemia and Moravia	85,201	13.96	3
KDU-ČSL	43,852	7.19	1
Green Party	26,528	4.35	1
Other parties	35,672	5.85	0
Total	610,200	100.00	23
