= Bohuslav Sobotka =

Czech former politician

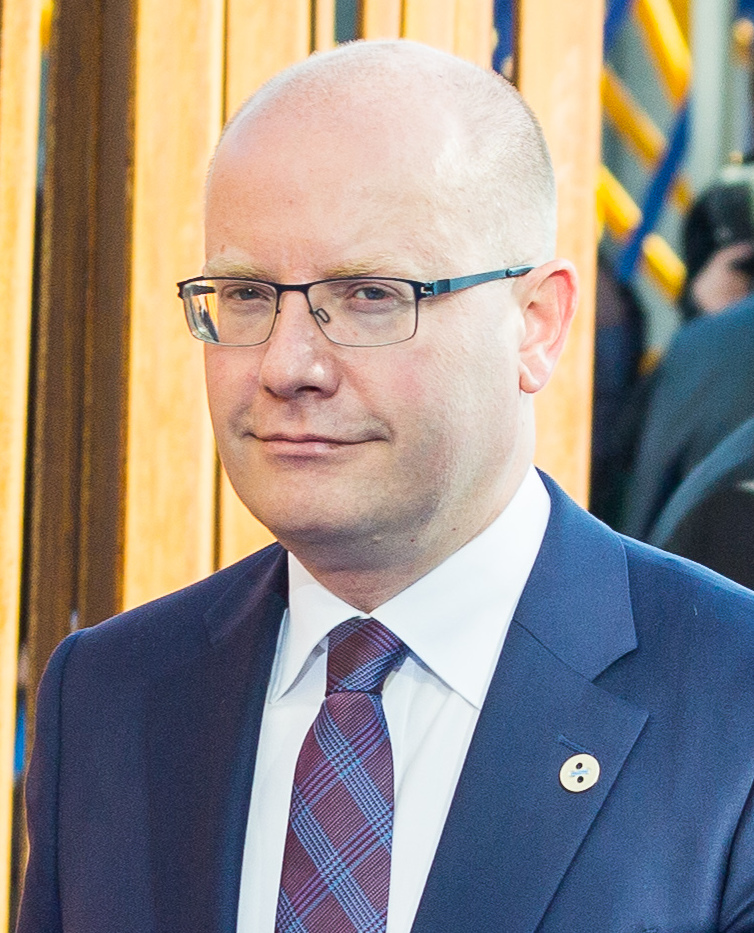
- Sobotka in 2017

Prime Minister of the Czech Republic
- In office 17 January 2014 – 6 December 2017
- President: Miloš Zeman
- Deputy: Andrej Babiš (2014–17); Pavel Bělobrádek; Richard Brabec
- Preceded by: Jiří Rusnok
- Succeeded by: Andrej Babiš

Leader of the Social Democratic Party
- In office 29 May 2010 – 15 June 2017; Acting: 29 May 2010 – 21 March 2011
- Preceded by: Jiří Paroubek
- Succeeded by: Milan Chovanec
- In office 26 April 2005 – 13 May 2006; Acting
- Preceded by: Stanislav Gross
- Succeeded by: Jiří Paroubek

Minister of Industry and Trade Acting
- In office 1 March 2017 – 4 April 2017
- Prime Minister: Himself
- Preceded by: Jan Mládek
- Succeeded by: Jiří Havlíček

Minister of Finance
- In office 12 July 2002 – 4 September 2006
- Prime Minister: Vladimír Špidla; Stanislav Gross; Jiří Paroubek
- Preceded by: Jiří Rusnok
- Succeeded by: Vlastimil Tlustý

Member of the Chamber of Deputies
- In office 1 June 1996 – 31 March 2018

Personal details
- Born: 23 October 1971 (age 55) Telnice, Czechoslovakia
- Party: Social Democratic Party
- Spouse: Olga Pekárková (m. 2003; div. 2018)
- Children: 2
- Education: Masaryk University
- Website: Official website

Bohuslav Sobotka (Czech pronunciation: [ˈboɦuslaf ˈsobotka]; born 23 October 1971) is a Czech politician and lawyer who served as the prime minister of the Czech Republic from January 2014 to December 2017 and leader of the Czech Social Democratic Party (ČSSD) from 2010 until his resignation in June 2017. He was a member of the Chamber of Deputies (MP) from 1996 to 2018. Sobotka also served as Minister of Finance from 2002 to 2006.

Elected as an MP in 1996, Sobotka was appointed Finance Minister in the Cabinet of Vladimír Špidla in 2002, and reappointed in the cabinets of Social Democratic Prime Ministers Stanislav Gross and Jiří Paroubek. He also served two stints as Deputy Prime Minister. After the 2006 legislative election, Sobotka became an opposition MP. In 2011, he was elected leader of the Social Democrats and thus Leader of the Opposition to the Cabinet of Petr Nečas.

Following his party's victory in the 2013 Czech legislative election, Sobotka was appointed prime minister on 17 January 2014 by President Miloš Zeman, to head a center-left coalition government consisting of ČSSD, ANO 2011 and KDU-ČSL. His government introduced a series of measures to tackle tax evasion, such as electronic registration of sales and a VAT control system, strengthened relations with China, enacted police reforms, repealed the Civil Service Act, and introduced a smoking ban. He also clashed frequently with President Miloš Zeman regarding the Russian intervention in Ukraine and resulting sanctions, domestic policy, and a government crisis in May 2017 which saw Sobotka resign, then withdraw his resignation. Sobotka was the first prime minister in 15 years and the third in the history of the Czech Republic to finish his full term.

On 14 June 2017, resigned as leader of ČSSD due to low opinion polling prior to the 2017 legislative election, but opted to stay on as prime minister. He was re-elected in the South Moravian Region, and in December 2017 was succeeded as Prime Minister by Andrej Babiš. On 31 March 2018, Sobotka retired from the Chamber of Deputies citing personal reasons.

== Early life ==
Sobotka was born in Telnice, but soon moved with his family to Slavkov u Brna. He received a Master's degree in Law at Masaryk University.

== Early political career ==
After the fall of communism he helped rebuild the Czech Social Democratic Party (ČSSD), and also co-founded the Young Social Democrats, a youth wing of ČSSD.

He was first elected to the Chamber of Deputies in the 1996 legislative election.

== Minister of Finance ==
When the Cabinet of Vladimír Špidla was formed in 2002, Sobotka was appointed Finance Minister, and he was subsequently reappointed in the cabinets of Social Democrat Prime Ministers Stanislav Gross and Jiří Paroubek. As finance minister, Sobotka formed an advisory body of economists, which later became the Czech Government's National Economic Council. When Jiří Paroubek became prime minister in 2005, Sobotka reduced his restrictions which led to an increase in the deficit. He was also a Deputy Prime Minister from 2003 to 2004 and 2005 to 2006.

After the 2006 legislative election, Sobotka sat as an opposition MP, and was shadow finance minister in the Social Democrat shadow cabinet. His party won the legislative election in 2010 but failed to form a governing coalition and remained in opposition. Sobotka then served as interim leader of ČSSD after the resignation of Jiří Paroubek following the election.

Sobotka was elected leader of the party on 18 March 2011, defeating Michal Hašek, who became the first deputy leader. He thus became the Leader of the Opposition to the Cabinet of Petr Nečas.

== Prime Minister (2014–2017) ==
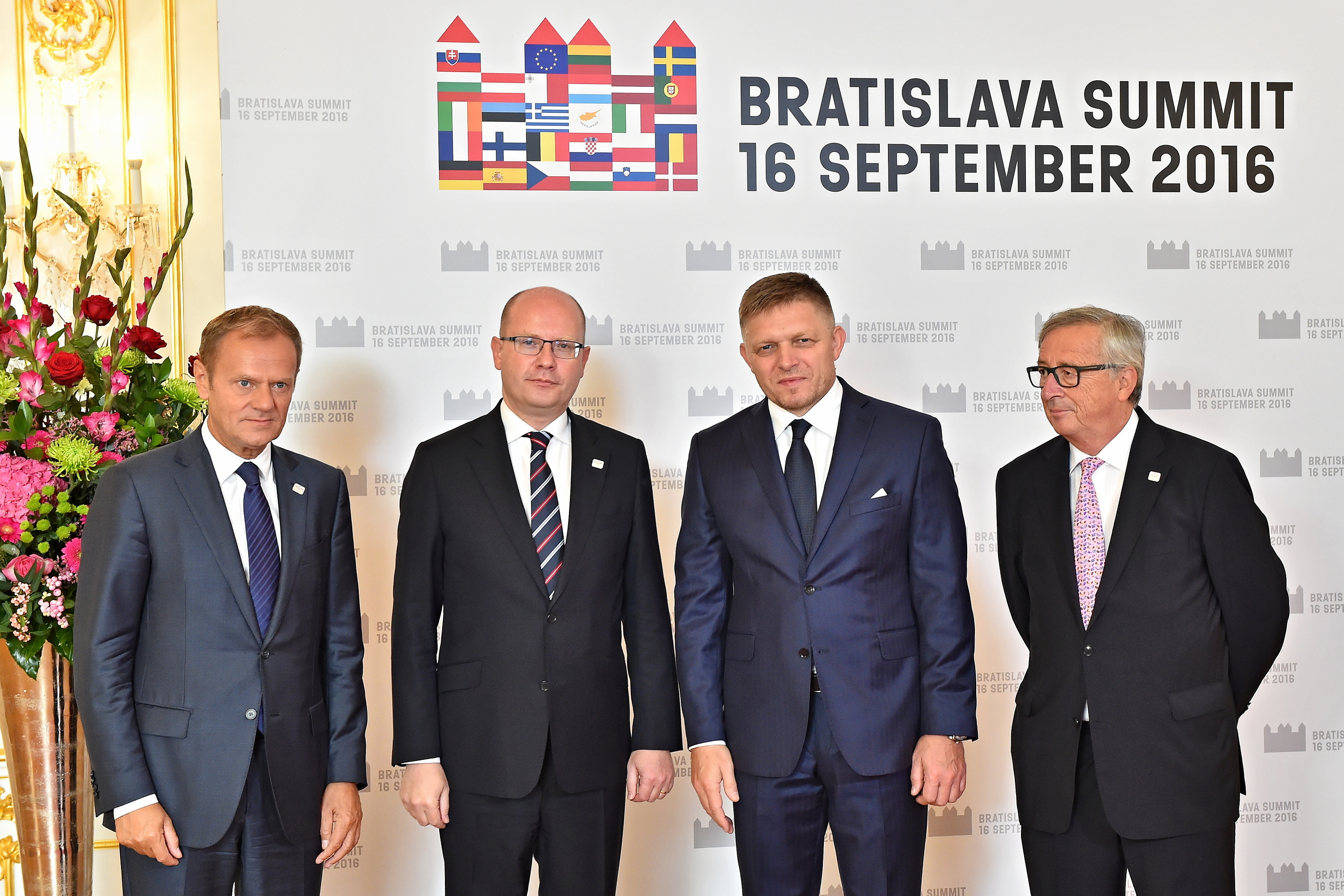
Sobotka with Slovak Prime Minister Robert Fico, President of the European Council Donald Tusk and President of the European Commission Jean-Claude Juncker in Bratislava, 16 September 2016

Sobotka led his party in the 2013 Czech legislative election, which they won with 20.45% of the vote. He was designated as prime minister on 17 January 2014, and appointed as the 11th Prime Minister of the Czech Republic with his cabinet by President Miloš Zeman on 29 January 2014. His cabinet consisted of members of the coalition government comprising ČSSD, ANO 2011, and KDU-ČSL. Sobotka's government coalition had 111 seats out of 200 in the Chamber of Deputies, and his ČSSD had 50 seats.

As Prime Minister, Bohuslav Sobotka maintained a relatively positive stance on the Czech Republic's membership in the European Union. He stated that "membership of the Czech Republic in the European Union is a benefit", and that membership provides better security measures and economic stability. However, in early 2016, Sobotka said there would be a national debate on the country's place in the European Union in the case of British withdrawal.

On 26 May 2015, Sobotka's coalition government faced its first attempted overthrow, when the opposition called for a vote of no-confidence in the government because of Finance Minister Andrej Babiš. The attempt was not supported by the Chamber of Deputies.

In December 2016, Sobotka called for higher corporate taxes, stating: "The way taxation is set up right now it only obliges the big and rich players, who export their profits out of the Czech Republic. Annually, these sums amount to 200 to 300 billion Czech koruna."

Sobotka's government introduced a series of measures to tackle tax evasion (including electronic registration of sales and a VAT control system), strengthened relations with China, enacted police reforms, repealed the Civil Service Act, and introduced a smoking ban. He also frequently clashed with President Miloš Zeman regarding Russian intervention in Ukraine and the resulting sanctions, as well as domestic policy.

On 2 May 2017, Sobotka sparked a government crisis by announcing that he would resign because he could not bear responsibility for Finance Minister Andrej Babiš. Sobotka stated that Babiš had failed to clear up questions surrounding financial transactions connected to his business activity. Sobotka changed his mind on 5 May 2017, and instead decided to fire Babiš from his cabinet.

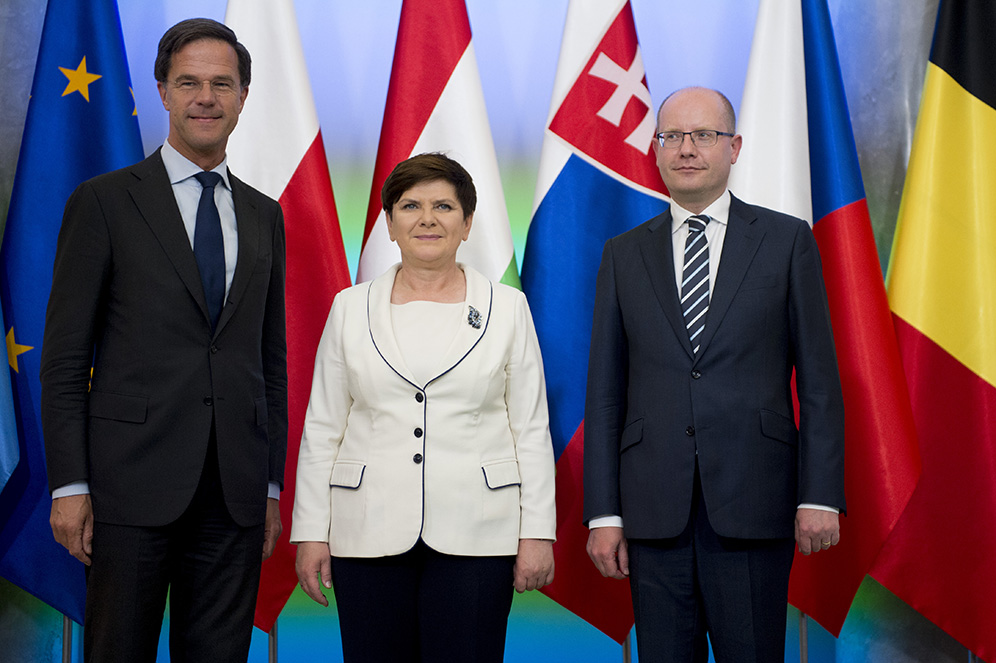
Sobotka with Polish Prime Minister Beata Szydło and Dutch Prime Minister Mark Rutte in Warsaw, 19 June 2017

On 14 June 2017, Sobotka announced his resignation as leader of ČSSD due to low opinion polling, some of which showed his party with support of 10%. He said that "the party has to undergo deeper changes so that it will be able to address people better and mobilize its supporters and members" ahead of the 2017 legislative election. However, he opted to stay on as prime minister. After his resignation, Minister of Interior Milan Chovanec became acting leader of ČSSD, while Minister of Foreign Affairs Lubomír Zaorálek became the party's candidate for Prime Minister. However, Sobotka decided to compete in the election as the party leader in the South Moravian Region, where he was re-elected. In December 2017, he was succeeded as Prime Minister by Andrej Babiš. He was the first prime minister in 15 years and the third in the history of the Czech Republic to finish his full term.

== Post-premiership ==
Sobotka returned to his hometown of Vyškov in January 2018 and stated that he planned to restart his political career. Members of the local ČSSD stated they did not intend for him to run in the upcoming municipal election. On 22 March 2018, Sobotka announced that he would resign as a member of the Chamber of Deputies, effective 1 April 2018, citing personal reasons.

== Personal life ==
Sobotka was married to Olga Sobotková between 2003 and 2018, with whom he has two sons.

Political offices
Preceded by Jiří Rusnok	Minister of Finance; 2002–2006	Succeeded by Vlastimil Tlustý
Preceded by Jiří Rusnok	Prime Minister of the Czech Republic; 2014–2017	Succeeded by Andrej Babiš
Party political offices
Preceded by Stanislav Gross	Leader of the Social Democratic Party; Acting; 2005–2006	Succeeded by Jiří Paroubek
Preceded by Jiří Paroubek	Leader of the Social Democratic Party; Acting: 2010–2011; 2010–2017	Succeeded by Milan Chovanec
