= Jiří Paroubek =

Prime Minister of the Czech Republic (2005–2006)

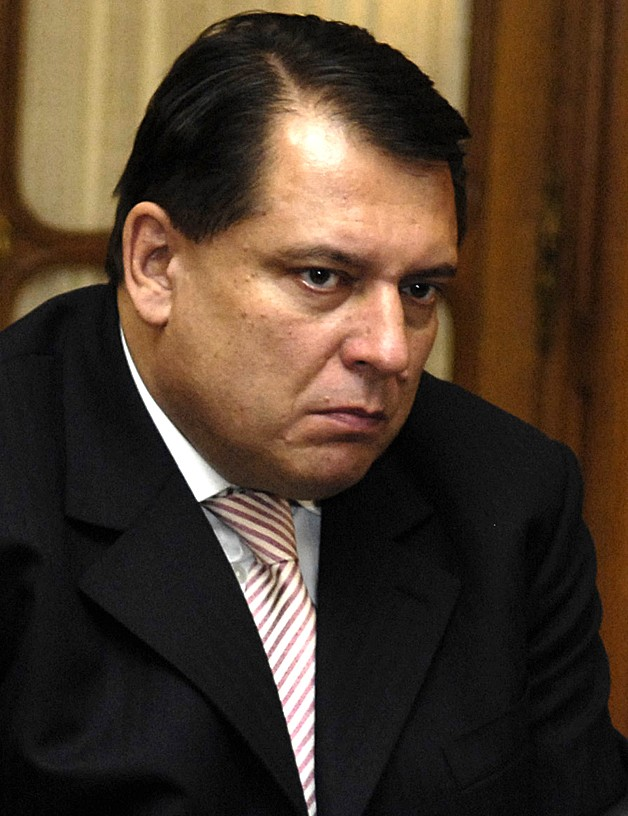
- Paroubek in 2007

Prime Minister of the Czech Republic
- In office 25 April 2005 – 16 August 2006
- President: Václav Klaus
- Preceded by: Stanislav Gross
- Succeeded by: Mirek Topolánek

Minister for Regional Development
- In office 4 August 2004 – 25 April 2005
- Prime Minister: Stanislav Gross
- Preceded by: Pavel Němec
- Succeeded by: Radko Martínek

Member of the Chamber of Deputies
- In office 3 June 2006 – 28 August 2013

Leader of the Czech Social Democratic Party
- In office 13 May 2006 – 7 June 2010
- Preceded by: Bohuslav Sobotka (acting)
- Succeeded by: Bohuslav Sobotka

Leader of Czech Sovereignty of Social Democracy
- Incumbent
- Assumed office 17 February 2024
- Preceded by: Jana Volfová

Personal details
- Born: 21 August 1952 (age 74) Olomouc, Czechoslovakia
- Party: Czech Sovereignty of Social Democracy (2024–present)
- Other political affiliations: ČSS (1970–1986); Czech Social Democratic Party (1989–2011); NÁR.SOC./LEV 21 (2011–2016)
- Spouse(s): Zuzana Zajíčková (m. 1979; div. 2007) Petra Kováčová (m. 2007; div. 2021) Gabriela Kalábková (m. 2023)
- Children: 2
- Education: University of Economics, Prague

Jiří Paroubek (Czech pronunciation: [ˈjɪr̝iː ˈparoubɛk]; born 21 August 1952) is a Czech politician who served as Prime Minister of the Czech Republic from April 2005 to September 2006. He was also the leader of the Czech Social Democratic Party from 2006 until his resignation following the 2010 parliamentary election.

== Early life and career ==
Paroubek was born in Olomouc and attended Jan Neruda Grammar School. He entered politics in 1970 at the age of 18, joining the Czechoslovak Socialist Party, a member party of the Czechoslovak National Front. He reached the lower levels of the party hierarchy before leaving the party in 1986.

Paroubek spent his one-year military service as an army food services supervisor in the southern Bohemian city of Prachatice. After graduating in 1976, Paroubek worked as a manager for several state companies including 'Restaurants and Canteens' (Czech: Restaurace a jídelny).

In 1979, as an executive committee member of the Czechoslovak Socialist Party, one of the puppet parties of the Communist regime, he attracted the attention of the communist state secret police (StB). He met agents three times in meetings where he allegedly expressed loyalty to the communist government and disagreement with opposition groups such as Charter 77. He was assigned the code name Roko, after his pet parakeet, but never actually signed a cooperation agreement with the secret police, and after 1982 the cooperation ceased, as Paroubek "did not have enough potential and contacts".

Following the Velvet Revolution in November 1989, Paroubek joined the re-established Social Democratic Party (ČSSD), and was given an executive post by chairman Jiří Horák. In 1993 he stood for chairmanship of the party but was defeated by Miloš Zeman. In 2000, he placed fourth in elections to the Senate of the Czech Republic in the Prague 8 district. Paroubek held senior positions in the Prague municipal government for over 14 years.

== Prime Ministership ==
In August 2004 Paroubek was appointed Minister of Regional Development in the government of Stanislav Gross. After a government crisis in early 2005 related to Gross's personal financial affairs, Paroubek succeeded him to become the 6th Prime Minister of the Czech Republic on 25 April 2005. On 13 May 2005, Paroubek's government passed a vote of confidence in the chamber of deputies, with all 101 coalition-party members supporting the government and the 98 opposition members and one independent voting against. Paroubek's government, which was little changed from Gross's, led the country until the parliamentary elections of June 2006.

On 30 July 2005, the CzechTek free techno party was broken up by around 1,000 riot police using tear gas and water cannons, claiming the event participants had damaged private property. The police actions left around 80 people and several police officers injured, leading to public protests in front of the Czech interior ministry. Paroubek had spoken in favour of the action beforehand and subsequently defended it, stating that the participants were "not dancing children but dangerous people", but was criticised for the raid by President Václav Klaus. Opposition parties and the media condemned the government, with some drawing comparisons between the actions of Paroubek's government and crackdowns against students by the communist government in 1989.

== Role in the Czech parliamentary election, 2006 ==
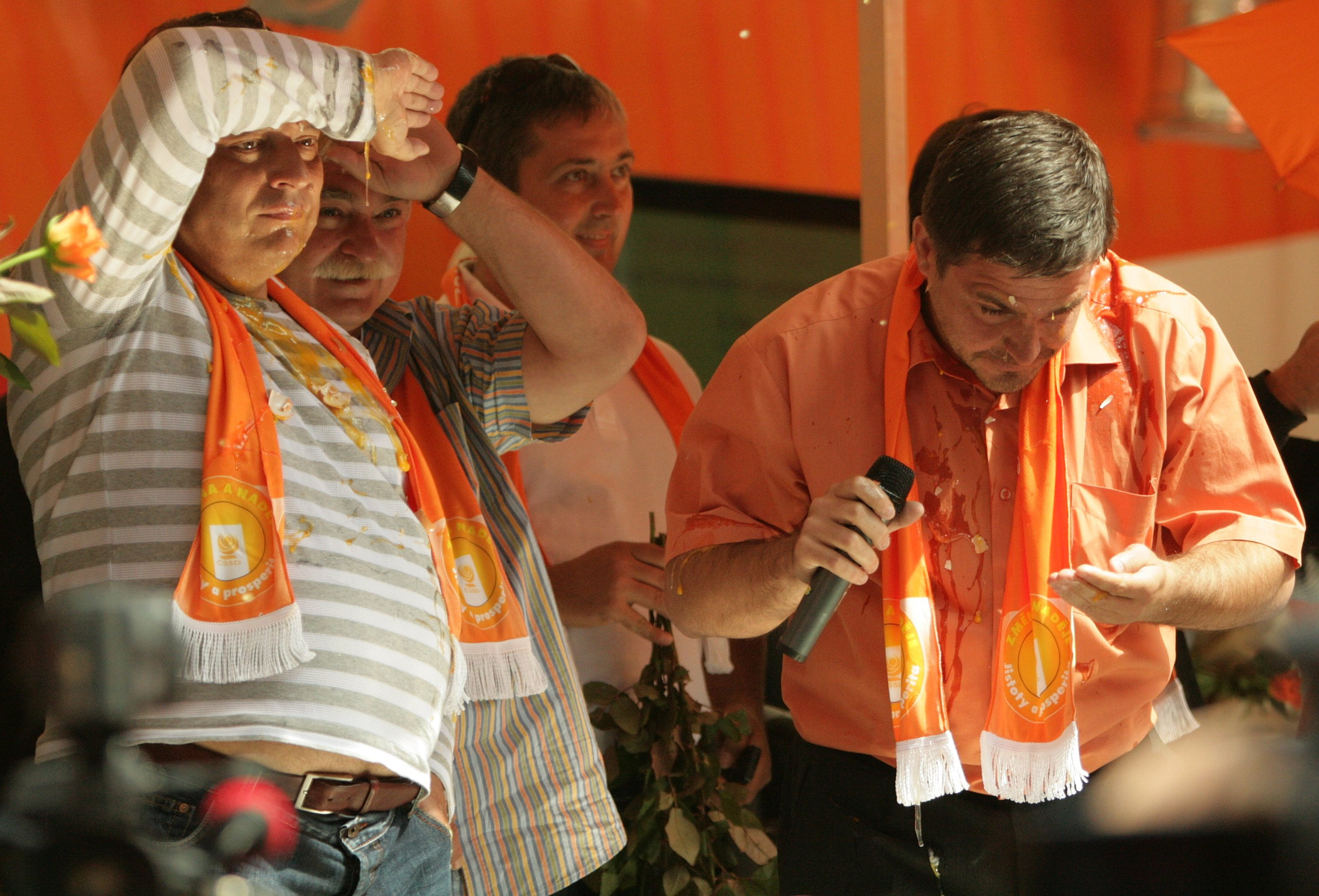
Jiří Paroubek attacked with eggs at a rally for European parliament elections 2009, Prague

Paroubek was selected as the election leader for the 2006 elections and at a ČSSD party congress in mid-May was elected uncontested as the new chairman with 90% of the vote. The election campaign was highly combative due to deep animosity between ČSSD, the conservative Civic Democratic Party (ODS), and their respective party leaders.

In May 2006, a report by Jan Kubice, head of the Czech Police's organized crime unit, was released. The so-called "Kubice Report" accused Paroubek of having links with the criminal underworld, as well as participating in a murder cover-up, attempts to derail police investigations and attempting to criminalise investigating officers. The report was initially classified and was presented to the proper commission of the Chamber of Deputies of the Czech Parliament, but was made public four days before election day. Paroubek responded by accusing the opposition ODS of conspiracy and "putschist" tactics, and vowed to punish those responsible if elected. After the election Paroubek stated that "ODS did not abhor breaking many laws and did it on purpose four days before the elections to avoid establishing of this evident and repeated breaking of legal order. (...) I feel a duty to announce that democracy in this country incurred a hard intervention comparable maybe only with February 1948. Only with the difference that a blue totalitarianism looms." Paroubek later publicly apologized for these comments.

Although opinion polling put support for ČSSD at around 10% when Stanislav Gross resigned as Prime Minister, the party eventually received 32.3% in the elections and finished runner-up to ODS.

On 9 September Paroubek released a document claiming it showed that the ODS planned to discredit him. Paroubek refused to name the source of this paper.

== Post Prime Ministership ==
After the 2006 elections, Paroubek remained as leader of ČSSD in opposition, and stayed in this post until his resignation immediately after the result of the 2010 parliamentary election was announced on 29 May 2010. Although the Social Democrats became the largest party in the Chamber of Deputies after the election, they were unable to form a governing coalition and Paroubek subsequently resigned as leader of the party.

On 9 October 2008, an official launch party was held for Paroubek's book The Czech Republic, Europe and the world through the eyes of a social democrat (Czech: Česko, Evropa a svět očima sociálního demokrata) in the Monarch restaurant in Prague. Shortly after the end of the event there was an altercation between two of the guests, businessman Bohumír Ďuričko and Václav Kočka jr., the son of a carousel operator. Kočka was killed in the incident. Ďuričko was convicted of the murder and sentenced to 12.5 years in prison. Jiří Paroubek initially distanced himself from the incident and claimed he did not know Ďuričko and had not invited him to the event. However, relations between Paroubek and Ďuričko had been publicly known since at least 2005, when Paroubek had planned to spend the holidays with Ďuričko's family, but cancelled the plans when it became known that Ďuričko was a communist secret service agent.

On 7 October 2011, Paroubek left ČSSD and in the same month founded a new party called National Socialists – 21st Century Left. Following the party's failure to win any seats in the Chamber of Deputies in the 2013 election, Paroubek announced his resignation from the party and retirement from politics in November 2014.

In 2017, Paroubek repeatedly attempted to rejoin the Social Democratic Party. However, his bids were vetoed by local and regional party representatives. In June 2018, Paroubek wanted to stand as a Social Democrat candidate in the 2018 Senate elections. However, his nomination was blocked by the party committee. He subsequently stood as an independent candidate.

In February 2018, Paroubek stated that he plans to run in the next Czech presidential election. He decided to run in the 2018 Senate election in Ostrava. He sought the nomination of ČSSD but subsequently ran as an independent. He received 7% of the vote and finished in 7th place, failing to win the seat.

On 23 February 2023, Paroubek launched the initiative Nespokojení (Dissatisfied), with the aim of connecting parties on the left of the political spectrum before the 2024 European Parliament elections and 2025 Czech parliamentary election. However, he subsequently joined extraparliamentary party Czech Sovereignty of Social Democracy, becoming chairman of the party in February 2024. He led the party into the 2024 European Parliament election, where the party received 0.25% and failed to win any seats, and into the 2025 Czech parliamentary election where the party received 0.18%, again failing to win any seats.

== See also ==
- Jiří Paroubek's Cabinet

Political offices
Preceded by Pavel Němec	Minister of Regional Development; 2004–2005	Succeeded by Radko Martínek
Preceded by Stanislav Gross	Prime Minister of the Czech Republic; 2005–2006	Succeeded by Mirek Topolánek
Party political offices
Preceded by Bohuslav Sobotka; Acting	Chairman of the Social Democratic Party; 2006–2010	Succeeded by Bohuslav Sobotka
