= 2004 Communist Party of Bohemia and Moravia leadership election =

- 15 May 2004
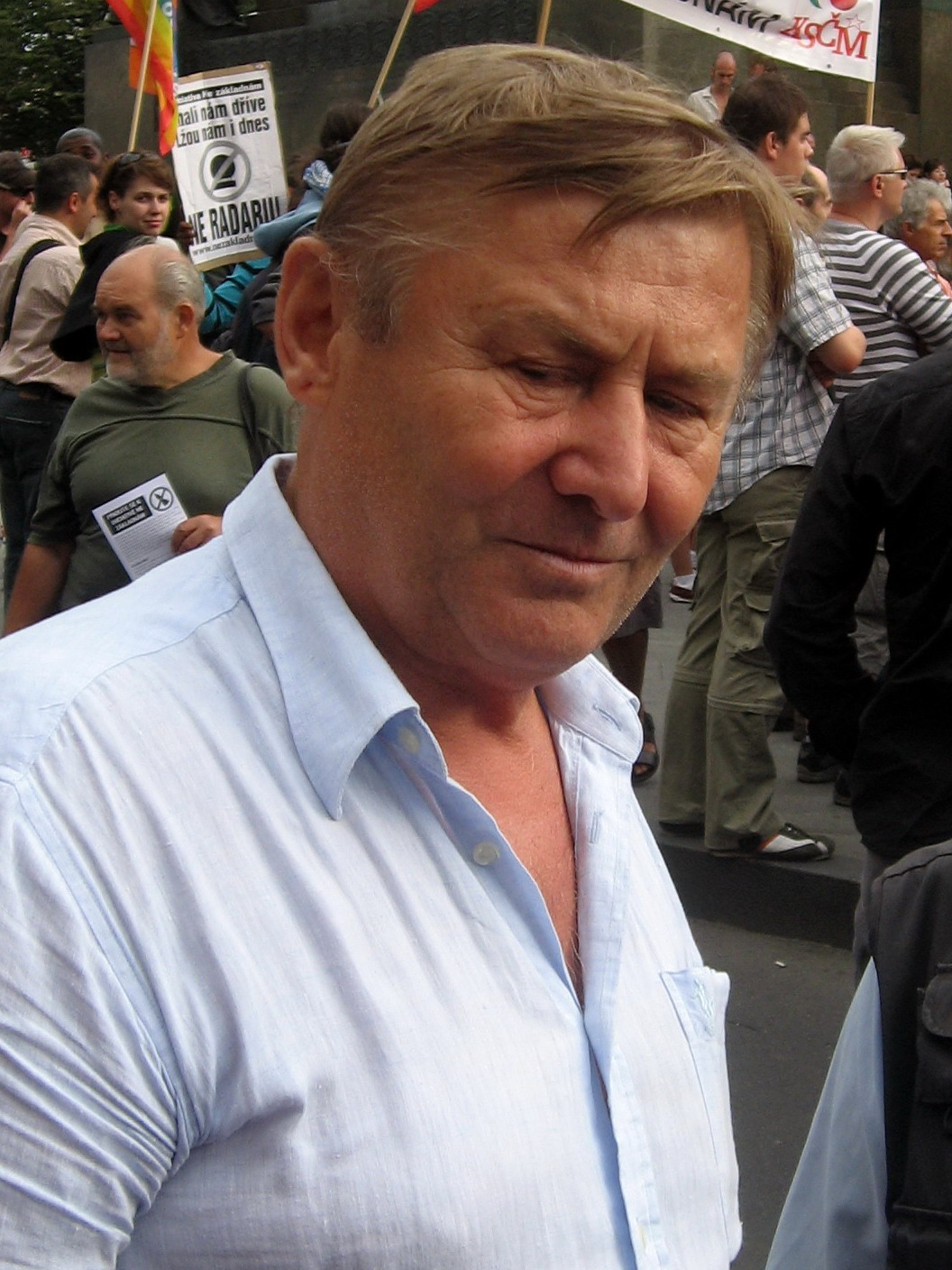

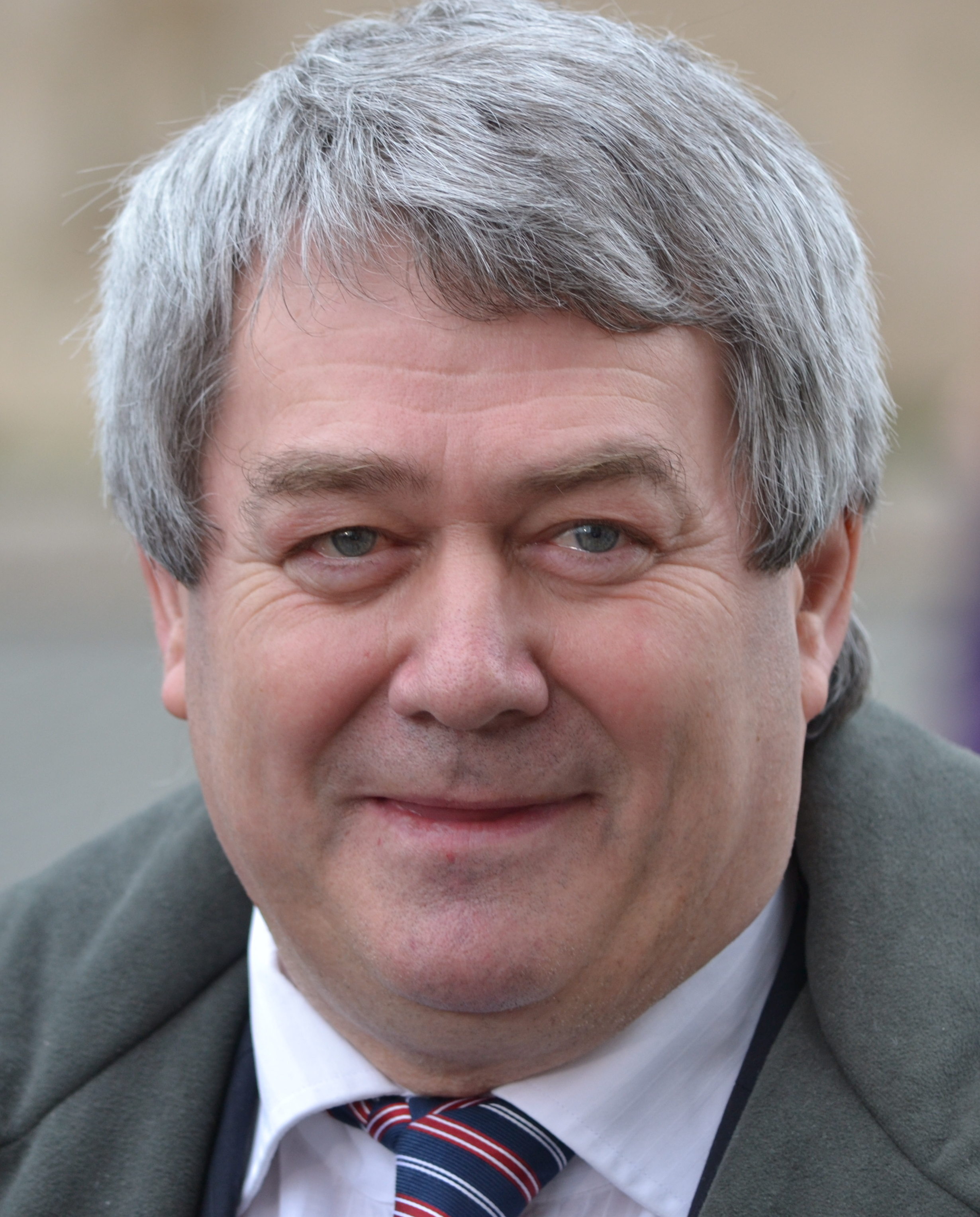
Candidate	Miroslav Grebeníček	Vojtěch Filip
Electoral vote	187	157
Percentage	54.4%	45.6%
Leader of KSČM before election
Miroslav Grebeníček
Elected Leader of KSČM
Miroslav Grebeníček

The Communist Party of Bohemia and Moravia (KSČM) held a leadership election on 15 May 2004. The incumbent leader Miroslav Grebeníček narrowly defeated Vojtěch Filip.

== Result ==
Candidate	1st Round		2nd Round	
Miroslav Grebeníček	159	46.09%	187	54.36%
Vojtěch Filip	139	40.29%	157	45.64%
Miloslav Ransdorf	25	7.25%		
Václav Exner	22	6.38%		

Grebeníček was considered front-runner of the election. His victory was considered certain due to good electoral performances of the party, but his victory in the first round was surprisingly narrow and it was speculated that he might lose in the second round, but won and remained the leader of KSČM.
