= 2018 Communist Party of Bohemia and Moravia leadership election =

- 21 April 2018
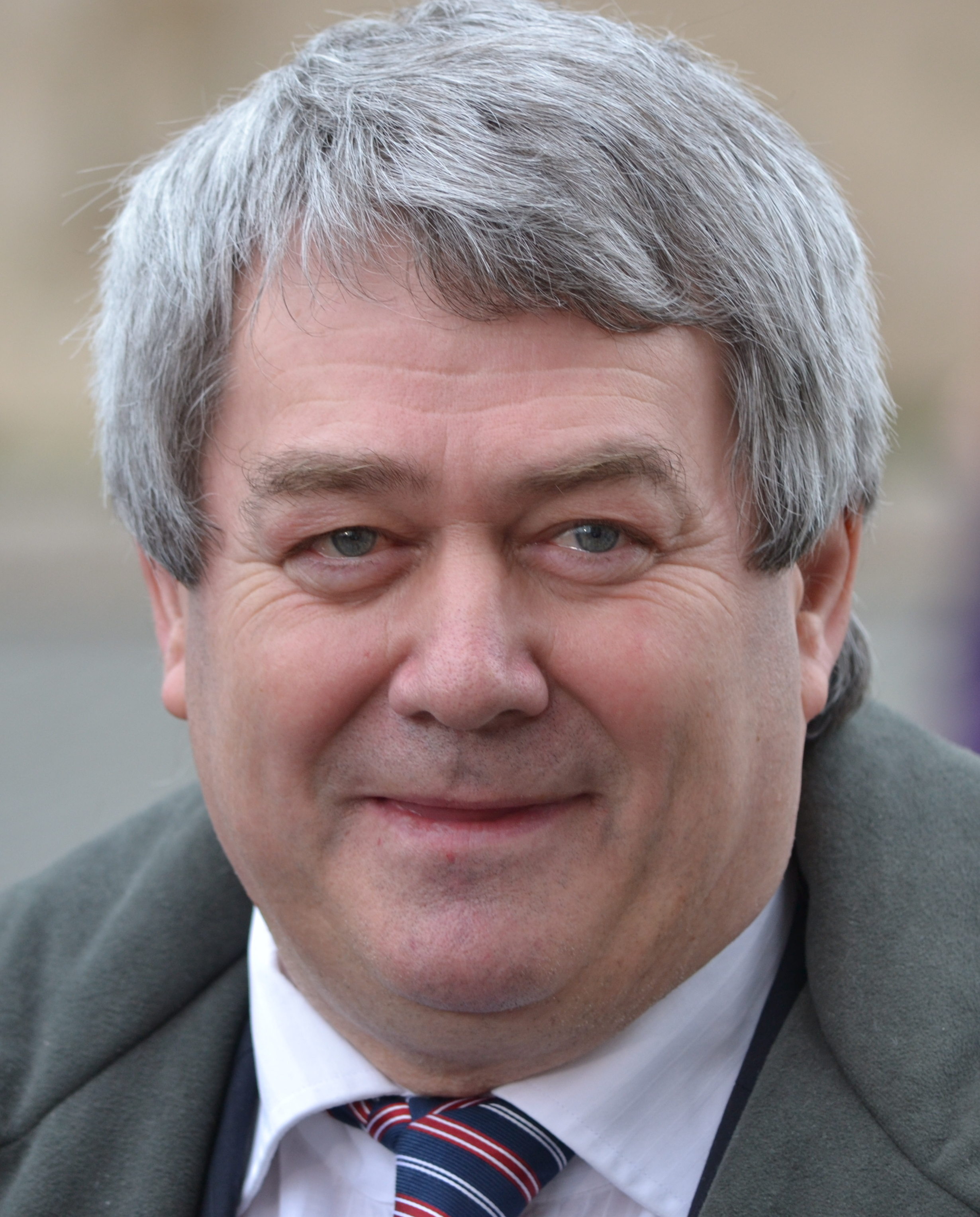

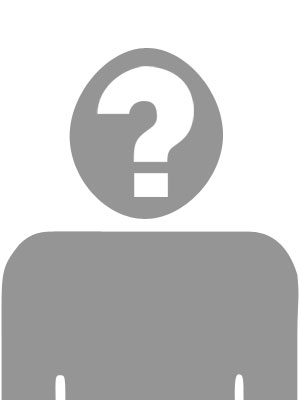
Candidate	Vojtěch Filip	Josef Skála
Electoral vote	165	143
Percentage	53.6%	46.4%
Leader of KSČM before election
Vojtěch Filip
Elected Leader of KSČM
Vojtěch Filip

The Communist Party of Bohemia and Moravia (KSČM) held a leadership election on 21 April 2018. Snap election was held as a result of party's losses in 2017 legislative election. Josef Skála was first major candidate to announce his candidacy. The incumbent leader Vojtěch Filip decided to run for another term. MEP Kateřina Konečná became third major candidate. Filip and Skála eventually advanced to second round.

Filip won the election and was elected for another four years.

== Background ==
KSČM received only 8% in 2017 legislative election and was reduced to 15 seats. Josef Skála the leader of inner-party's opposition called for the resignation of the incumbent leader Vojtěch Filip. It was announced that snap election would be held in April 2018. Filip decided to not seek reelection. Skála announced he will run if he receives support in regions.

In November 2017, conflict within the party started. Radical wing represented by Skála attacked moderate wing led by Jiří Dolejš. Skála called Dolejš's wing Bourgeoisie opportunists. Dolejš believes that KSČM should modernise party's image.

The incumbent leader Vojtěch Filip eventually decided to seek another term as the leader and announced his candidacy on 27 February 2018. He secured large number of nominations from party's organisations. His candidacy was criticised by many members of the party due to his responsibility for 2017 election result. His main rival Skála was on the other hand criticised for his radical stances. MEP Kateřina Konečná was speculated as a possible third candidate due to her youth and moderate stances. Kateřina Konečná announced her candidacy on 27 March 2018. MPs Leo Luzar and Zdeněk Ondráček also received nominations for the position of leader.

Parlamentní Listy reported on 20 April 2018, that Luzar and Ondráček won't run but will instead support Konečná. 10 people were nominated for the position of leader. Filip, Skála and Konečná are considered only candidates with a real chance to win the position. Filip is considered the front-runner a he received highest number of nominations.

=== Candidates ===
- Oldřich Duchoň
- Vojtěch Filip, the incumbent leader. He previously stated that he won't run but changed his mind. He himself mentioned that he could run if he gets support from regions.
- Stanislav Grospič, former Deputy leader of the party.
- Ivan Hrůza
- Martin Juroška
- Kateřina Konečná, MEP. She was speculated as a possible candidate since March 2018. She announced her candidacy on 27 March 2018.
- Leo Luzar, MP.
- Zdeněk Ondráček, MP.
- Daniel Pawlas
- Josef Skála, Filip's main opponent in the party. He plans to run for the position. He is considered an orthodox communist.

=== Declined ===
- Jiří Dolejš, Vice-Chairman. Speculated to be a candidate.
- Filip Zachariáš, Chairman of Vyškov KSČM. He was speculated as a possible rival for Skála.

== Opinion polls ==
Date	Agency	Josef Skála	Kateřina Konečná	Vojtěch Filip	Zdeněk Ondráček	Leo Luzar	Stanislav Grospič	Oldřich Duchoň	Daniel Pawlas	Martin Juroška	Ivan Hrůza	Undecided
17 Apr 2018	Phoenix Research	18%	16%	15%	9%	5%	5%	5%	4%	1%	1%	21%

== Voting ==
Leo Luzar and Zdeněk Ondráček withdrawn from election early on 21 April 2018 and supported Kateřina Konečná. Stanslav Grospič also withdrawn from election. 315 delegates are allowed to vote. Ivan Hrůza withdrawn from election during his nomination speech and endorsed Skála. Vojtěch Filip and Josef Skála advanced to second round. Filip received 110 votes while Skála 105. Kateřnia Konečná came third with 79 votes. Filip won the second round, with 165 votes to Skála's 143.

Candidate	1st Round		2nd Round	
Vojtěch Filip	110	36.18%	165	53.57%
Josef Skála	105	34.54%	143	46.43%
Kateřina Konečná	79	25.99%		
Martin Juroška	7	2.30%		
Oldřich Duchoň	2	0.66%		
Daniel Pawlas	1	0.33%		
