= 2021 Communist Party of Bohemia and Moravia leadership election =

- 23 October 2021
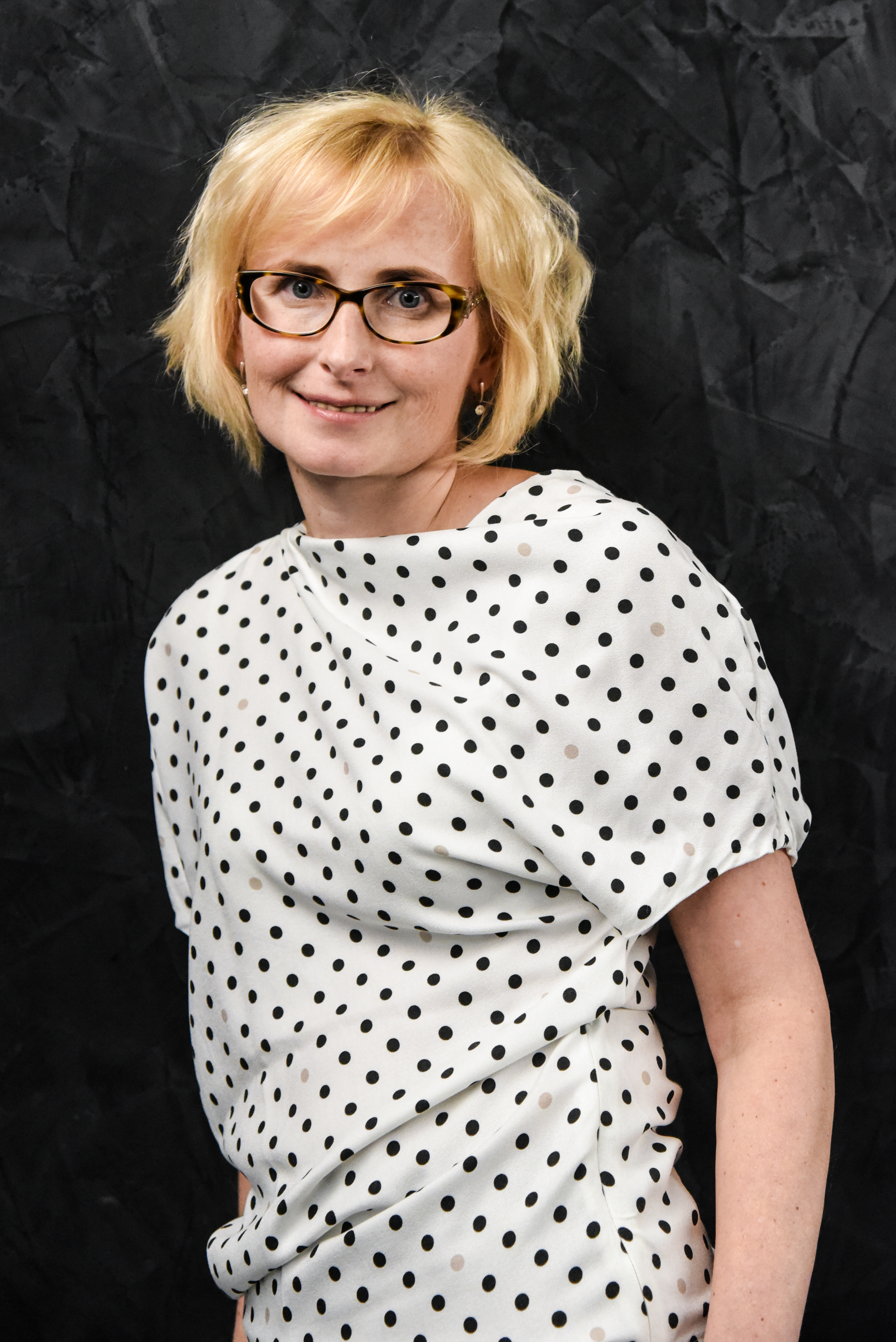

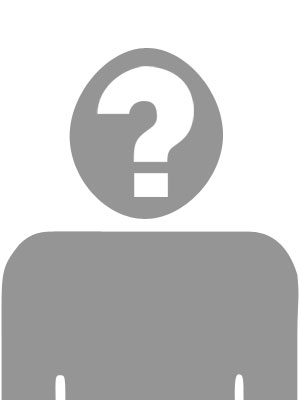

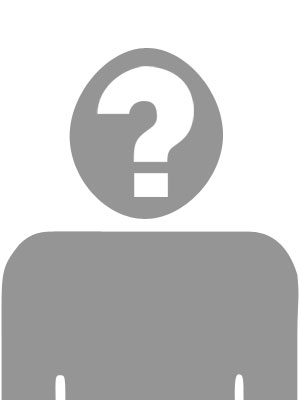

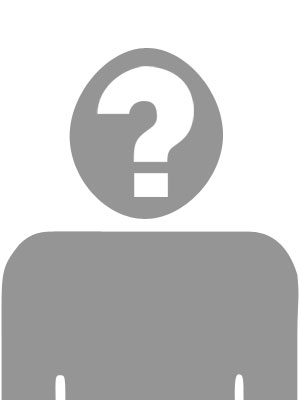
Candidate	Kateřina Konečná	Josef Skála
Electoral vote	175	70
Percentage	55.73	22.29
Candidate	Hana Aulická Jírovcová	Jan Zámarský
Electoral vote	63	6
Percentage	20.06	1.91
Leader of KSČM before election
Vojtěch Filip
Elected Leader of KSČM
Kateřina Konečná

The Communist Party of Bohemia and Moravia (KSČM) held a leadership election on 23 October 2021. MEP Kateřina Konečná was elected the new leader.

== Background ==
KSČM received only 8% in 2017 legislative election and was reduced to 15 seats. Party's support in opinion polls was reduced since then and party's members became worried that party might not enter parliament during next legislative election. In October 2019 party's opponents of incumbent leader Vojtěch Filip started to focus on Ústí region Governor Oldřich Bubeníček as a potential candidate for leader. Bubeníček was endorsed by Josef Skála who ran against Filip during previous elections. Bubeníček stated that he doesn't plan to run, as he believes that party should be run by someone younger.

Petr Šimůnek announced his candidacy on 5 October 2019.

Olomouc regional organisation held a Conference on 1 February 2020. It gave nomination to Kateřina Konečná and Vojtěch Filip. On 7 February 2020 Filip stated that he is yet to decide if he runs for another term.

MEP Kateřina Konečná confirmed her Candidacy on 2 March 2020. Election was postponed on 13 March 2020 due to 2020 coronavirus outbreak in the Czech Republic. New date was announced for 28 November 2020. 10 Candidates were running at the time while Zdeněk Ondráček was reported to plan announcing his Candidacy in November 2020.

KSČM suffered heavy losses during 2020 Czech regional elections which led Filip to offer his resignation to the party committee. It will decided on 14 November 2020 if it accepts it. Despite this Filip didn't rule out his candidacy to the position of leader. Filip's reelection was deemed unlikely due to party's poor election results. There were 11 candidates applied to the election including Filip, Konečná, Ondráček or Aulická Jírovcová.

Filip announced on 9 October 2020 that he won't be running for reelection. The party had to delay its congress on 6 November 2020 due to second wave of Covid-19 pandemic. As a result Filip led the party to 2021 Czech legislative election. It received only 3.6% of votes and lost all of its seats in the Chamber of Deputies. MEP Kateřina Konečná reconfirmed her candidacy following party's defeat. Election of the new leader was moved to 23 October 2021. Hana Aulická Jírovcová, Kateřina Konečná, Josef Skála and Jan Zámarský were the only candidates who eventually decided to apply candidacy. Aulická Jírovcová was endorsed by outgoing leader Filip.

== Candidates ==
- Hana Aulická Jírovcová
- Kateřina Konečná, MEP.
- Josef Skála
- Jan Zámarský.

=== Withdrawn ===
- Stanislav Grospič, MP.
- Leo Luzar, MP.
- Zdeněk Ondráček, MP.
- Petr Šimůnek
- Martin Říha, Chairman of Brno City committee.
- Miloslava Vostrá, MP.

=== Declined ===
- Oldřich Bubeníček, governor of Ústí region.
- Vojtěch Filip, the incumbent leader. He announced on 9 October 2020 that he won't run for another term.

== Voting ==
Voting was held on 23 October 2021. Konečná was elected in first round by large margin. She received 175 votes while her main opponent Skála received 75 votes, Aulická Jírovcová received 63 votes and Zámarský 6.

Candidate	Votes	%
Kateřina Konečná	175	54.86%
Josef Skála	75	23.51%
Hana Aulická Jírovcová	63	19.75%
Jan Zámarský	6	1.88%
