= 2022 Communist Party of Bohemia and Moravia leadership election =

- 14 May 2022
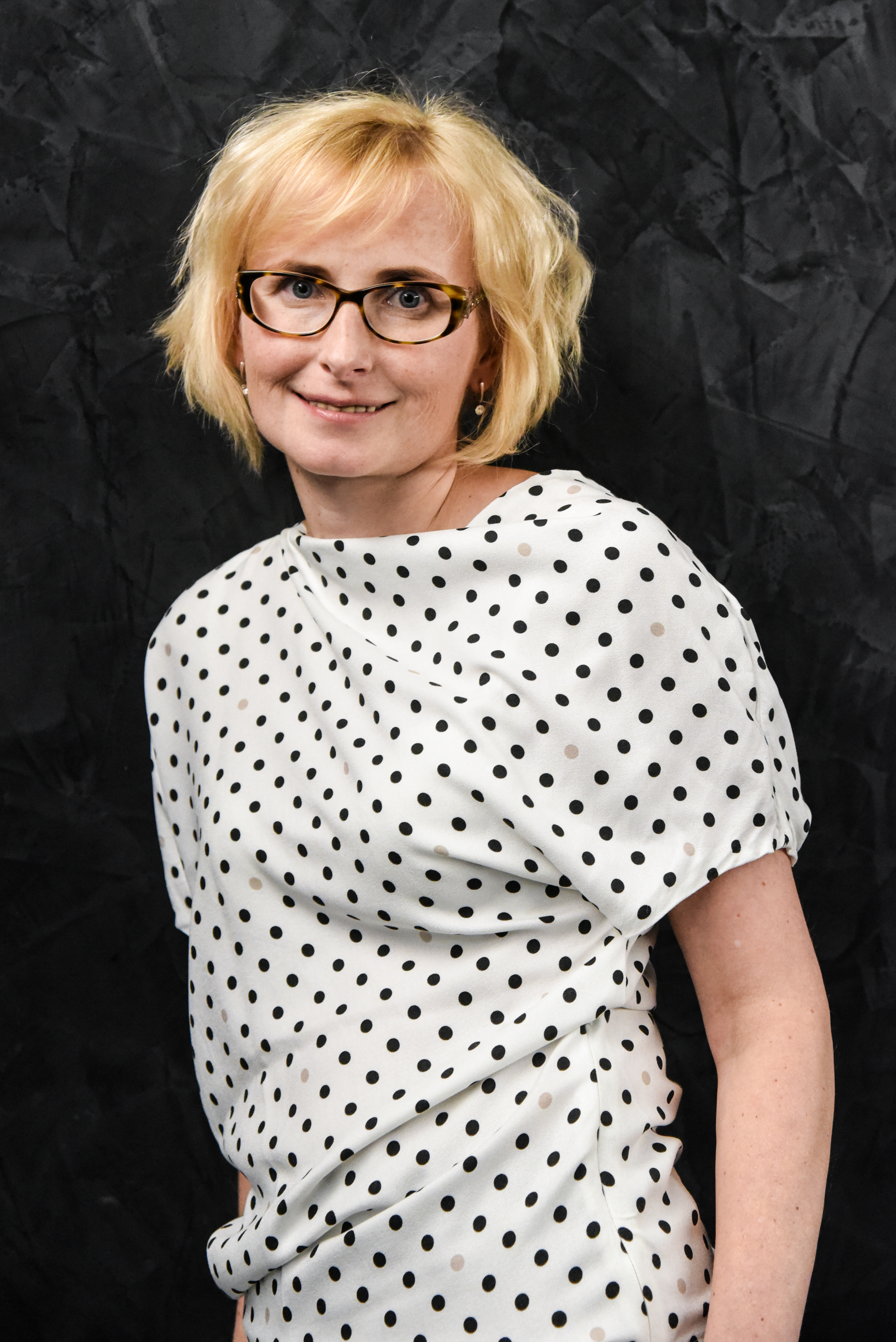
| Candidate | Kateřina Konečná |
| Electoral vote | 254 |
| Percentage | 88.8 |
Leader of KSČM before election
Kateřina Konečná
Elected Leader of KSČM
Kateřina Konečná

The Communist Party of Bohemia and Moravia (KSČM) held a leadership election on 14 May 2022. MEP Kateřina Konečná was reelected as the leader of KSČM.

== Candidates ==
- Kateřina Konečná, the incumbent leader.
- Josef Skála, party's presidential nominee for Czech upcoming presidential election
- Milan Krajča, deputy leader of party.

== Voting ==
Konečná's rivals Skála and Krajča withdrawn from election before voting started. Konečná received 254 of 286 votes and won the election.

| Candidate | Votes | % |
|---|---|---|
| Kateřina Konečná | 254 | 88.8% |
