= 1993 Communist Party of Bohemia and Moravia leadership election =

- 26 June 1993
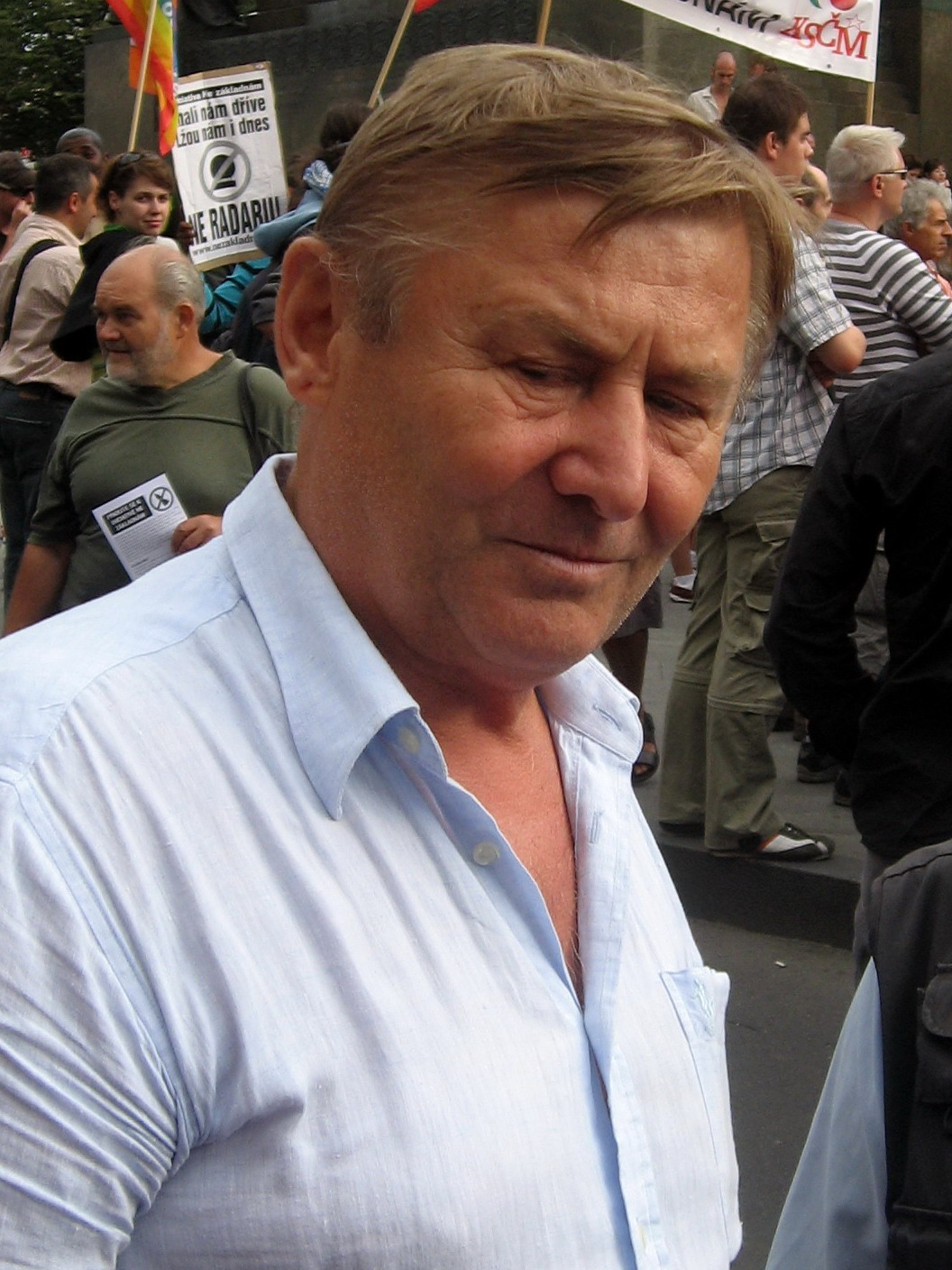

Candidate	Miroslav Grebeníček	Tomáš Bleier
Electoral vote	186	113
Percentage	62.2%	37.8%
Leader of KSČM before election
Jiří Svoboda
Elected Leader of KSČM
Miroslav Grebeníček

The Communist Party of Bohemia and Moravia (KSČM) held a leadership election on 26 June 1993. Miroslav Grebeníček was elected new leader of the party. The incumbent leader Jiří Svoboda did not run. Grebeníček was a candidate of Conservative wing who was against reforms. His main rival was Tomáš Bleier.

== Election ==
The election was held at a time of dispute about future of the party. It was held on 26 June 1993 in Prostějov. There were originally 11 candidates - Tomáš Bleier, Miroslav Grebeníček, Zdeněk Klanica, Vlastislav Kuchař, Jiří Machalík, Jiří Maštálka, Jaroslav Ortman, Miloslav Ransdorf, Vladimír Řezáč, Jaroslav Soural and Marie Stiborová. Machalík withdrew prior to the vote about the name of the party. When delegates voted for a name Communist Party of Bohemia and Moravia, other candidates, including Stiborová and Ortman also withdrew from the election. Only 4 candidates remained in the election - Bleier, Grebeníček, Klanica and Ransdorf. Grebeníček won the first round, receiving 170 of 356 votes. Bleier also advanced to the second round with 70 votes. Ransdorf had 33 votes and Klanica 13. 70 votes were invalid. Randorf endorsed Grebeníček in the second round. Grebeníček wa elected in the second round when he received 186 votes while Bleier only 113.

Candidate	1st Round		2nd Round	
Miroslav Grebeníček	170	47.75%	186	62.21%
Tomáš Bleier	70	19.66%	113	37.79%
Miloslav Ransdorf	33	9.27%		
Zdeněk Klanica	13	3.65%		

== Aftermath ==
Election ended internal conflicts of the party. Grebeníček's leadership banned reformist wings within the party. Many members were expelled from KSČM. Grebeníček remained party's leader until 2005. KSČM became a major party under his leadership.
