= 1999 Communist Party of Bohemia and Moravia leadership election =

- 4 November 1999
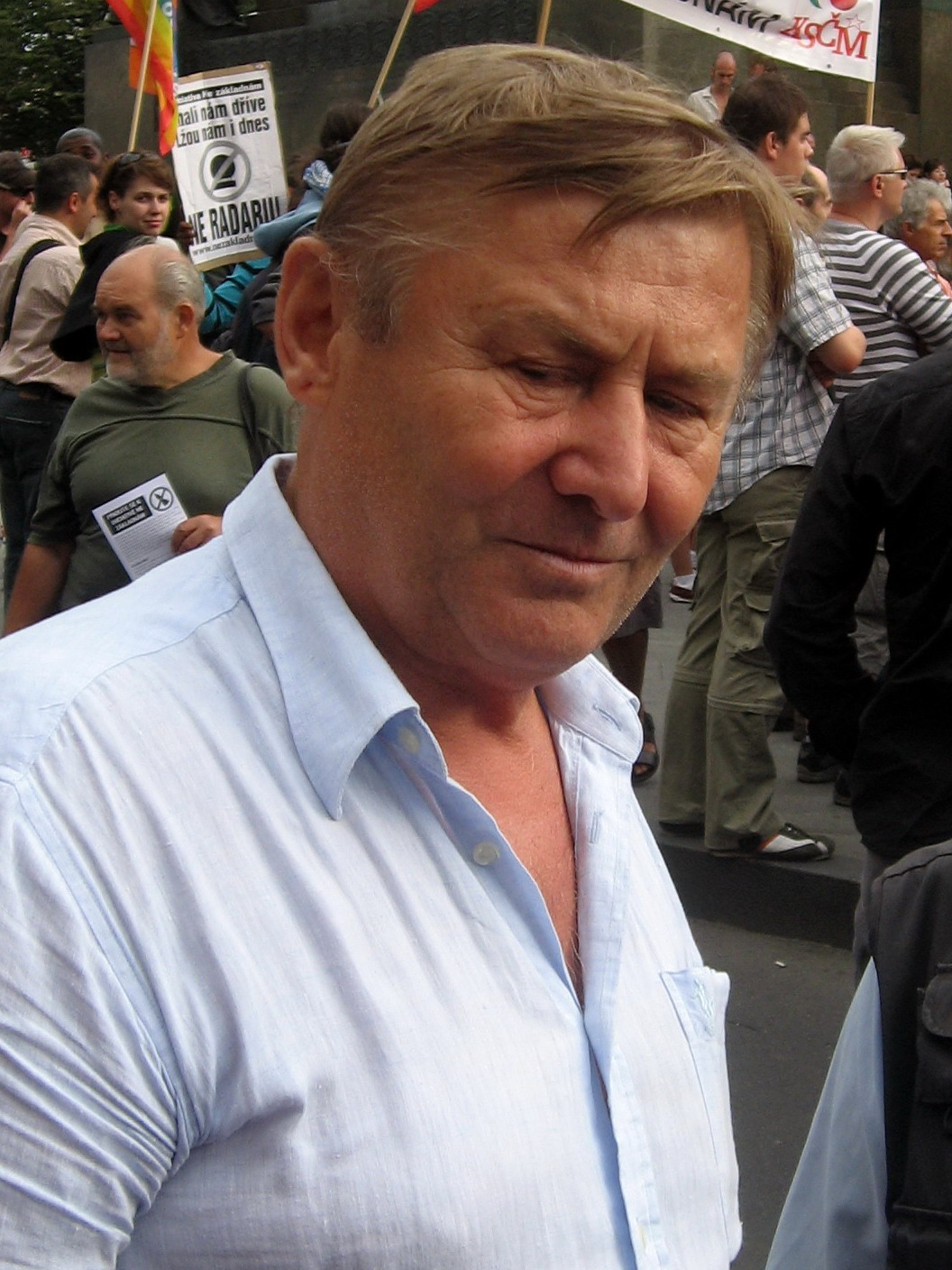

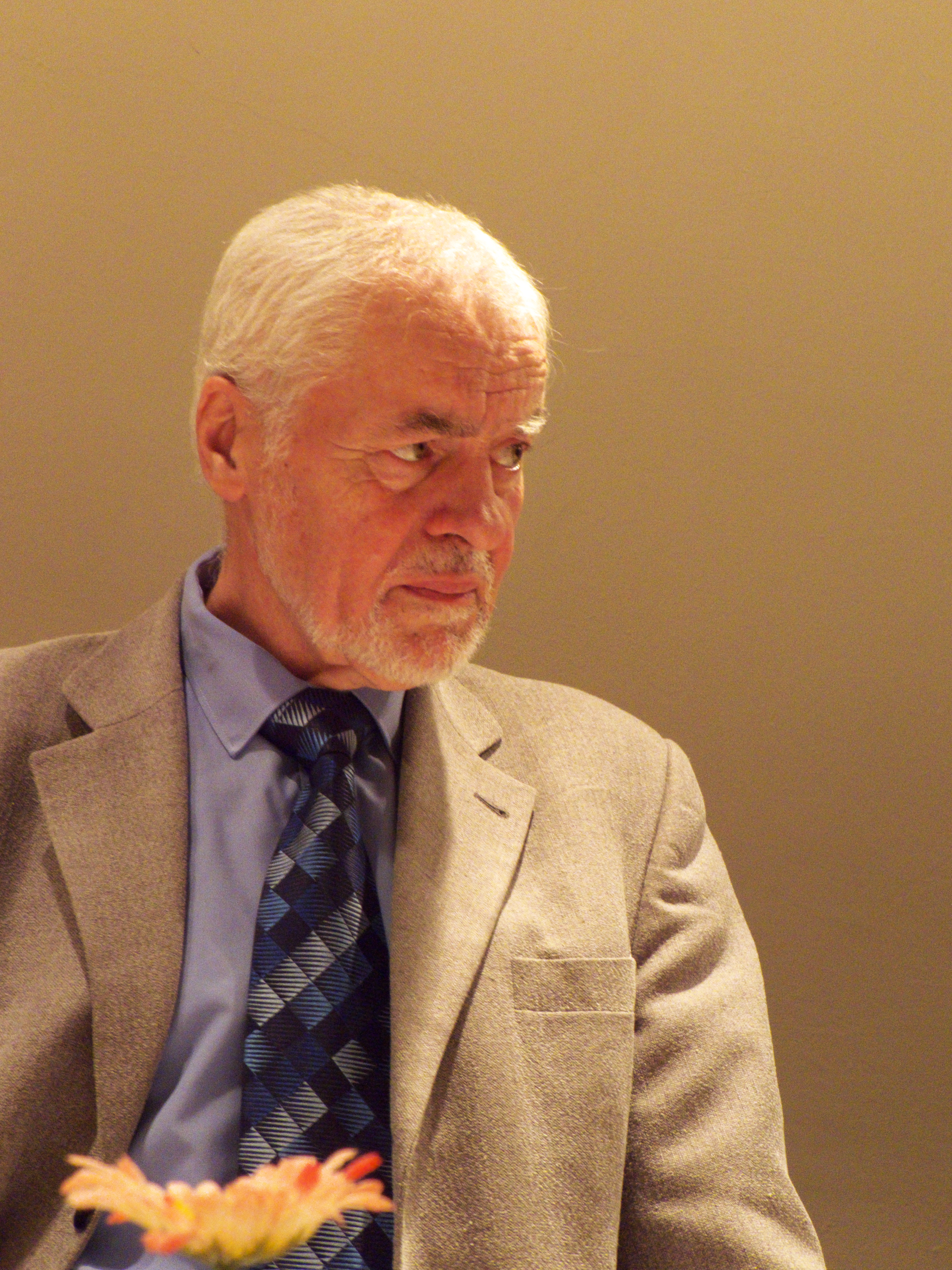

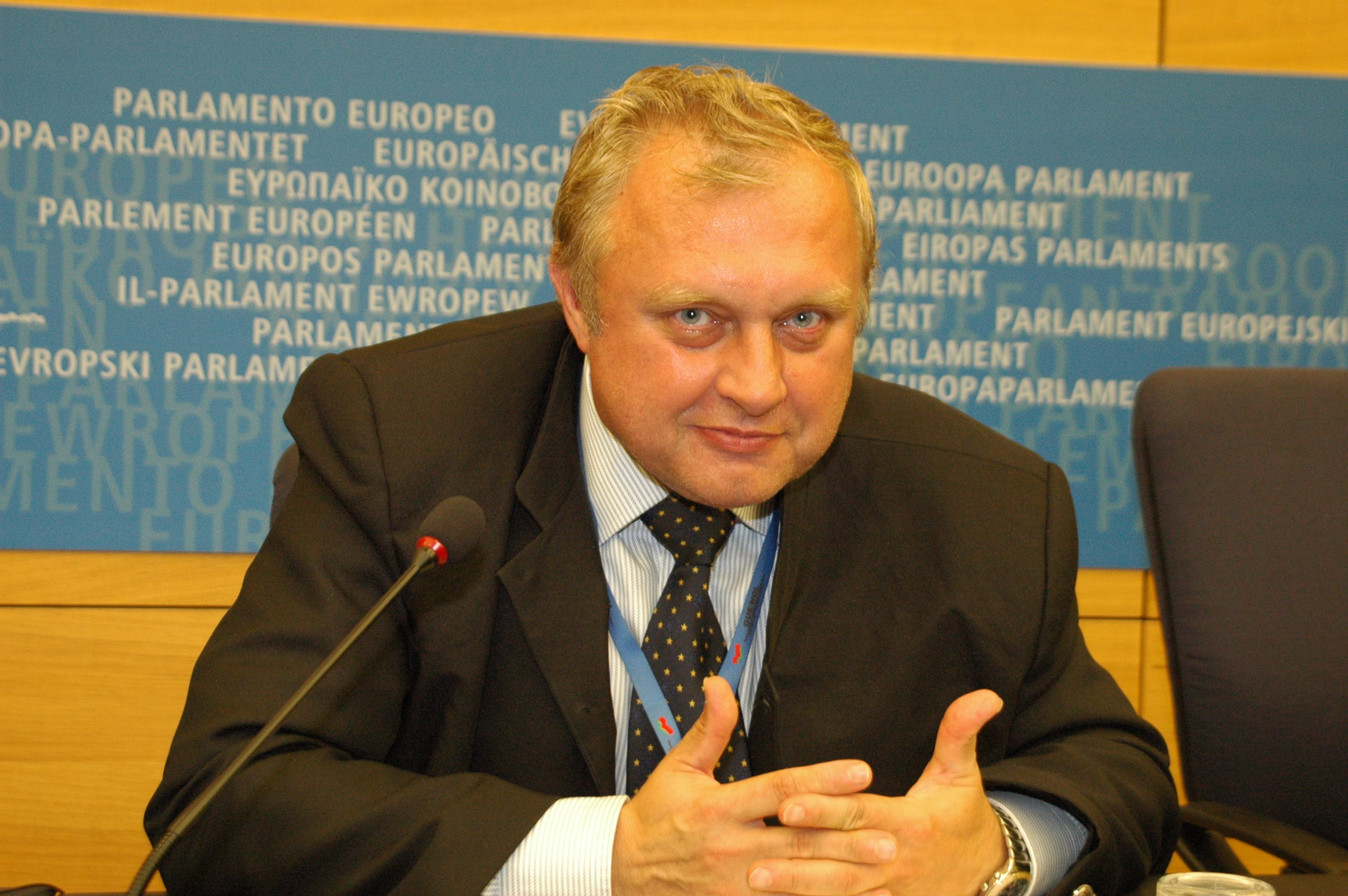
Candidate	Miroslav Grebeníček	Václav Exner	Miloslav Ransdorf
Electoral vote	186	62	15
Percentage	70.70%	23.6%	5.7%
Leader of KSČM before election
Miroslav Grebeníček
Elected Leader of KSČM
Miroslav Grebeníček

The Communist Party of Bohemia and Moravia (KSČM) held a leadership election on 5 November 1999. Miroslav Grebeníček was elected for another term as the leader. Grebeníček received over 70% and defeated his rivals Václav Exner and Miloslav Ransdorf. Grebeníček stated that Exner was a candidate of Conservatives who like past.
