= 2005 Communist Party of Bohemia and Moravia leadership election =

- 1 October 2005
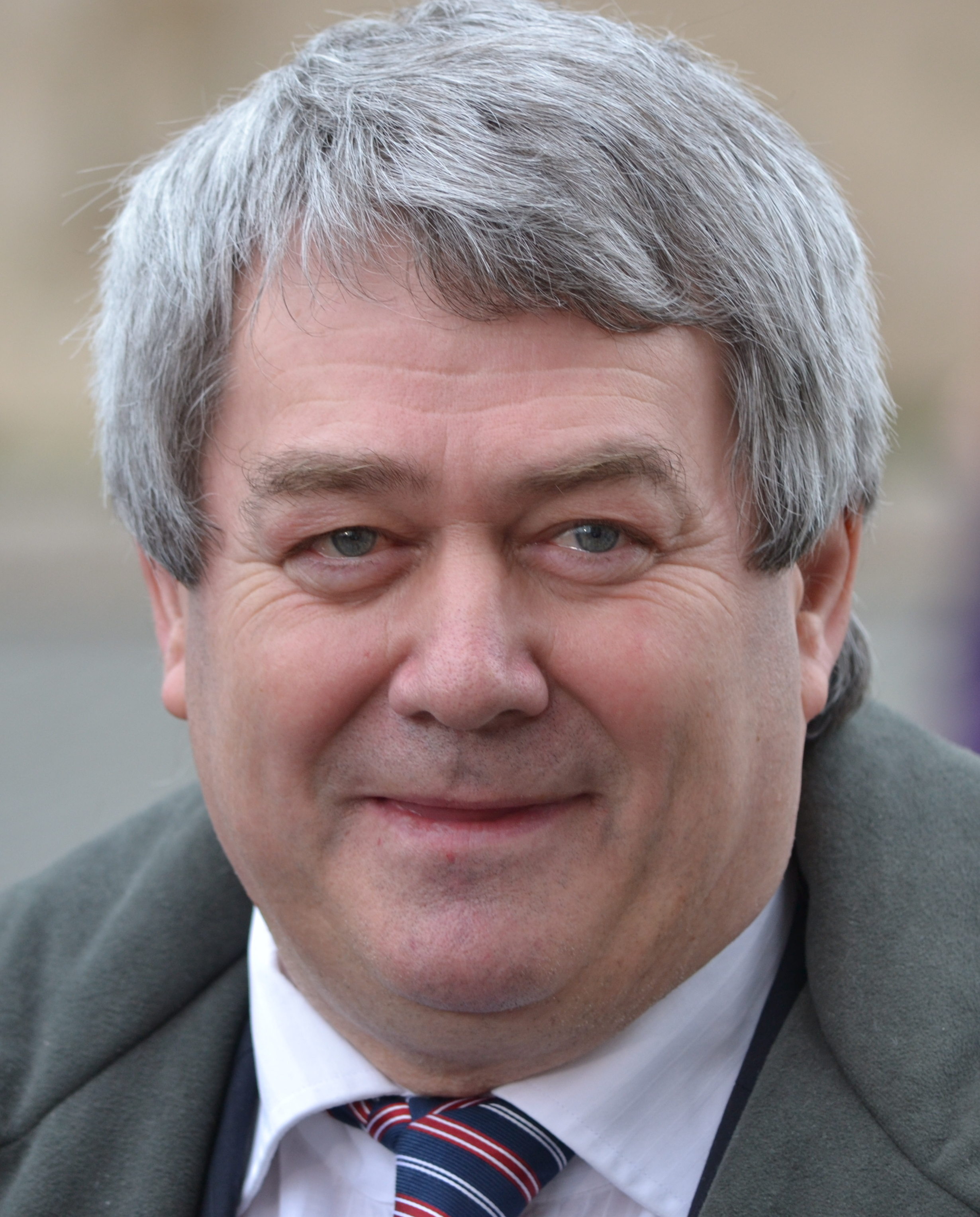

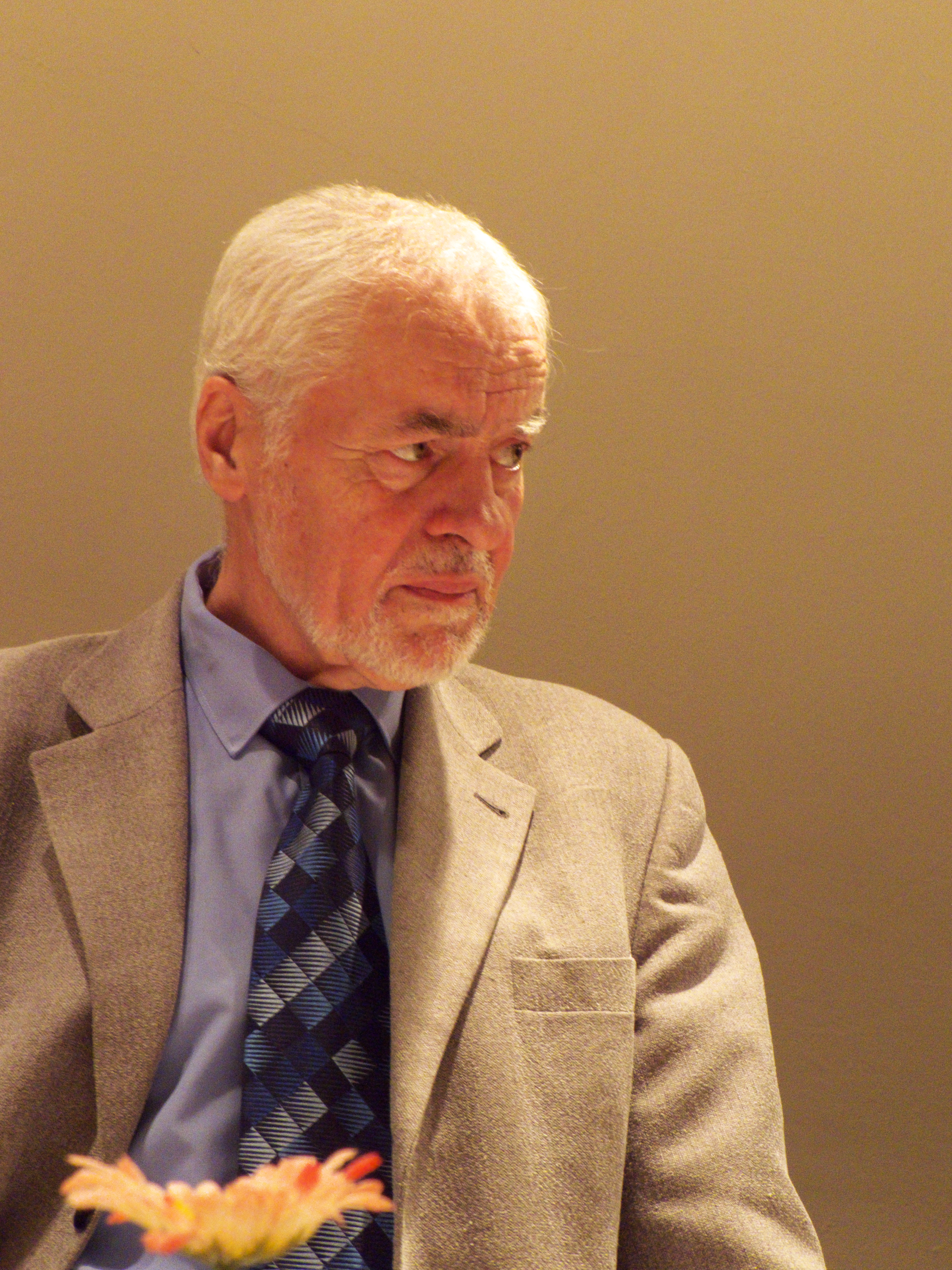
Candidate	Vojtěch Filip	Václav Exner
Electoral vote	63	20
Percentage	75.9	24.1%
Leader of KSČM before election
Miroslav Grebeníček
Elected Leader of KSČM
Vojtěch Filip

The Communist Party of Bohemia and Moravia (KSČM) held a leadership election on 1 October 2005. It was held following the resignation of the incumbent leader Miroslav Grebeníček. Vojtěch Filip defeated Václav Exner and became the new leader of KSČM. Filip was considered the candidate who is more similar to Grebeníček.
