= 2008 Communist Party of Bohemia and Moravia leadership election =

- 17 May 2008
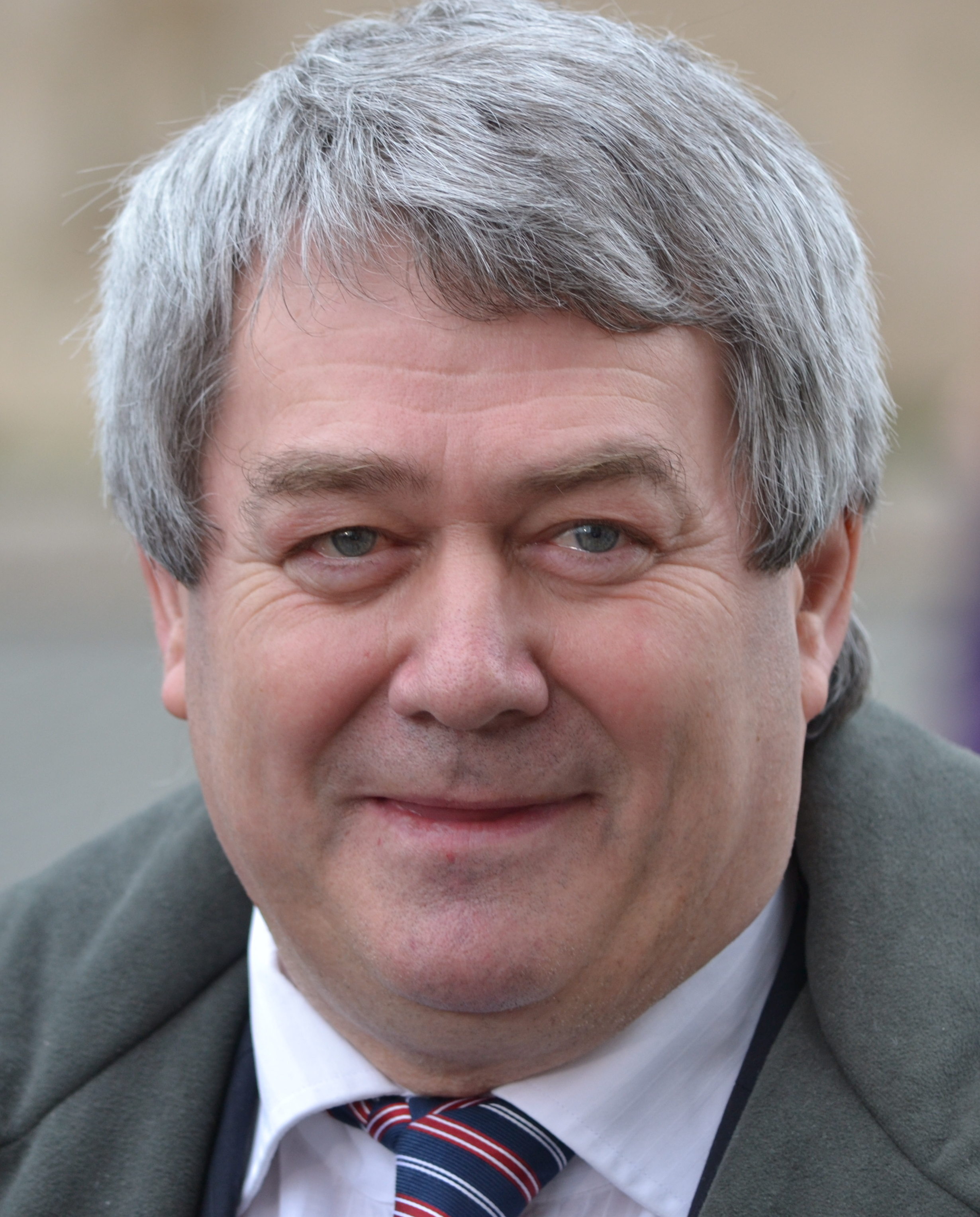

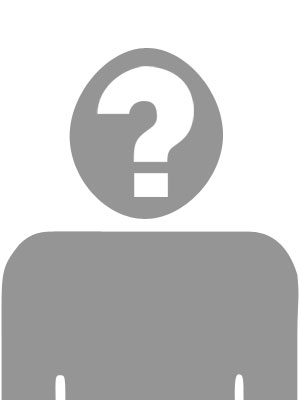

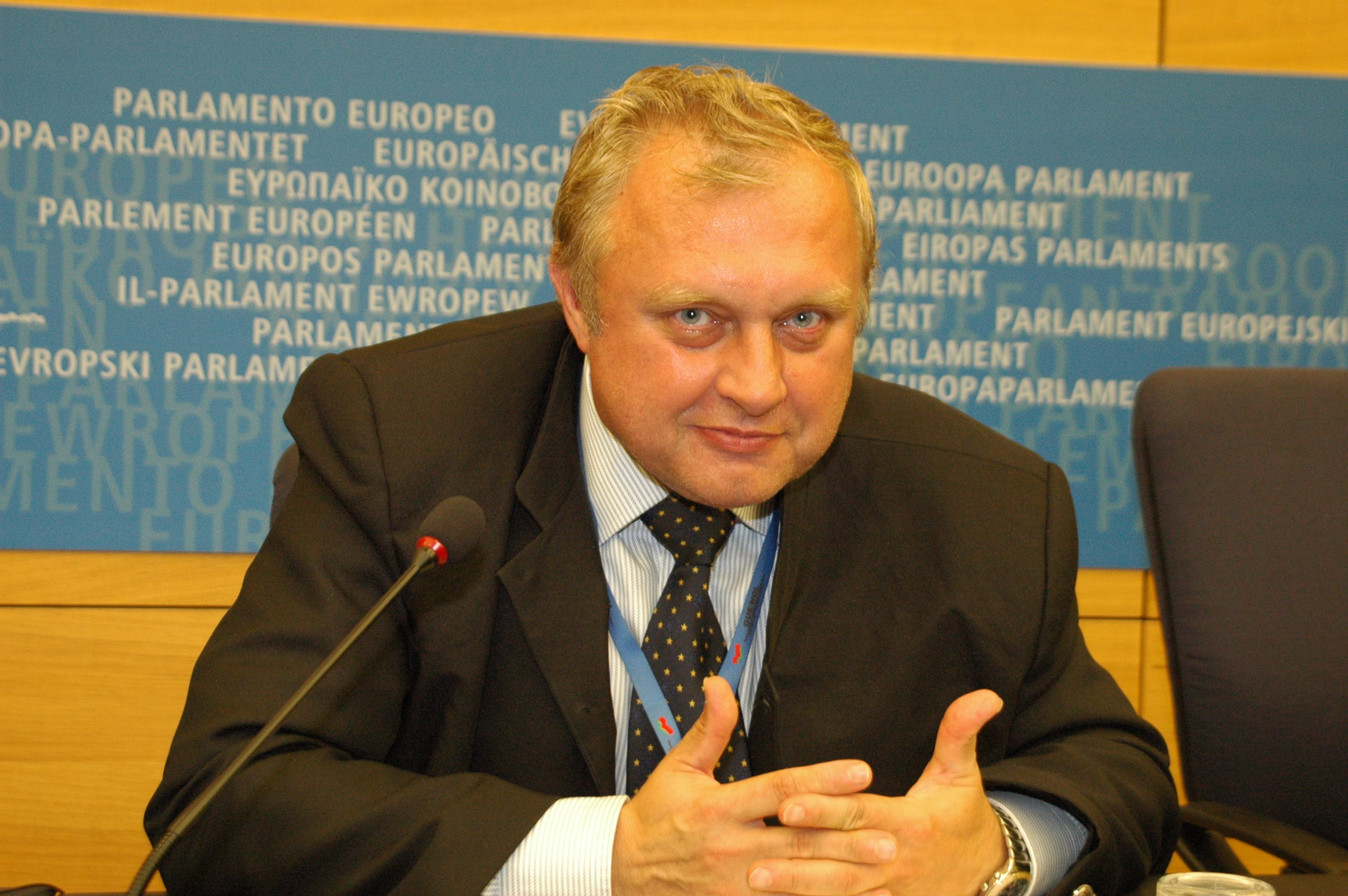

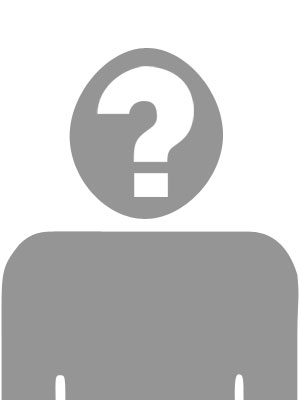
Candidate	Vojtěch Filip	Stanislav Grospič	Miloslav Ransdorf
Electoral vote	276	70	22
Percentage	64.5%	25.6%	8.1%
Candidate	Soňa Marková
Electoral vote	5
Percentage	1.8%
Leader of KSČM before election
Vojtěch Filip
Elected Leader of KSČM
Vojtěch Filip

The Communist Party of Bohemia and Moravia (KSČM) held a leadership election on 17 May 2008. Zhe incumbent leader Vojtěch Filip was reelected.

Filip's rivals were MP Stanislav Grospič, MEP Miloslav Ransdorf and MP Soňa Marková. Grospič was the strongest rival of Filip. Ransdorf didn't take his poor result well. He stated that KSČM is like "Trabant - it will serve but won't excite.

== Result ==
Candidate	Votes	%
Vojtěch Filip	176	64.47%
Stanislav Grospič	70	25.64%
Miloslav Ransdorf	22	8.09%
Soňa Marková	5	1.83%
