= Endorsements in the 2023 Czech presidential election =

This is a list of notable individuals and organizations who voiced their endorsement for the office of the Czech president, including those who subsequently retracted or withheld their endorsement of any candidate during the 2023 Czech presidential election.

== Andrej Babiš ==
=== Political ===
==== First round ====
- Václav Klaus, former Prime Minister and former President of the Czech Republic (2003–2013) stated that Babiš is the only candidate whom can people thoughtfully vote for.
- Vojtěch Filip, former leader of the Communist Party of Bohemia and Moravia
- Miloš Zeman, the incumbent President (2013-Since).

Parties

- ANO 2011
- Czech Sovereignty
- DOMOV

==== Second round ====
- Jan Sedláček, deputy leader of National Democracy and leader of National Youth
- Petr Hannig, leader of Party of Common Sense

Parties

- Alliance of National Forces
- Communist Party of Bohemia and Moravia
- Law, Respect, Expertise
- Tricolour Citizens' Movement

=== Non-political ===
- Gabriela Chocholoušová Petirová, opera singer.
- Agáta Hanychová, model.
- David Pet, musician.
- Petr Robejšek, political scientist and former politician.
- Laky Royal, barber.
- Roman Skamene, actor.
- Josef Váňa, steeplechase jockey.

== Jaroslav Bašta ==
=== Political ===
- Adam B. Bartoš, leader of National Democracy
- Ladislav Jakl
- Vojtěch Filip, former leader of the Communist Party of Bohemia and Moravia
- Josef Skála, political scientist and planned candidate for the Communist Party of Bohemia and Moravia.
- Tomáš Vandas, leader of Workers' Party of Social Justice

Parties

- Freedom and Direct Democracy
- Alliance of National Forces
- Akce D.O.S.T.
- Czech National Social Party
- Hnutí PES
- Manifest.cz
- Tricolour Citizens' Movement
- Zachraňme náš stát

=== Non-political ===
- Petr Hájek, journalist.
- Václav Hrabák, publicist.
- Otto Jarolímek, businessman.
- Zdeněk Koudelka, constitutional lawyer.
- Pepa Nos, songwriter.
- Monika Pilloni, publicist.

== Karel Diviš ==
=== Non-political ===
- Jiří Babica, chef.

== Pavel Fischer ==
=== Political ===
- Marek Benda, MP.
- Hayato Okamura, Senator.
- Pavel Novotný, Mayor of Praha-Řeporyje.
- Miloš Vystrčil, President of the Senate.
- Karel Schwarzenberg, former Minister of Foreign Affairs and candidate in 2013 election.

Parties

- Civic Democratic Party
- KDU-ČSL
- TOP 09
- Club of Committed Non-Party Members
- SNK European Democrats

=== Non-political ===
- Lukáš Langmajer, actor.
- Josef Polášek, actor.

== Marek Hilšer ==
=== Political ===
- Jiří Drahoš, Senator and 2018 presidential candidate initially endorsed Hilšer's candidacy.
- Klára Long Slámová, withdrawn candidate.
- David Smoljak, Senator.
- Adéla Šípová, Senator.

Parties

- Club of Committed Non-Party Members

=== Non-political ===
- Gabriela Svárovská, member of Association for International Questions.
- Martin Vadas, documentarist.
- Michaela Weissová, director of Home for Trees.

== Danuše Nerudová ==
=== Political ===
- Jan Grolich, South Moravian governor.
- Daniel Herman, former Minister of Culture.
- Miroslav Kalousek, former Minister of Finance.
- Josef Středula, withdrawn candidate

Parties

- Civic Democratic Party
- KDU-ČSL
- TOP 09
- Club of Committed Non-Party Members
- SNK European Democrats

=== Non-political ===
- Sergei Barracuda, rapper.
- Anna Geislerová, actress.
- Ladislav Gerendáš, actor.
- Lukáš Hejlík, blogger.
- Petra Jirglová, blogger.
- Jan Musil, moderator.
- Tomáš Sedláček, economist.
- Anatol Svahilec, slam poet.
- Nikol Štíbrová, actress.
- Veronika Žilková, actress.

== Petr Pavel ==
=== Political ===
==== First round ====
- Jiří Drahoš, Senator and 2018 presidential candidate eventually endorsed Pavel in January 2023.
- Petr Kolář, diplomat.
- Tomáš Macura, mayor of Ostrava
- Olga Sommerová, documentary film director and former MP.
- Ivo Vondrák, deputy leader of ANO 2011
- Vladimír Votápek, diplomat and analyst.

Parties

- Civic Democratic Party
- KDU-ČSL
- TOP 09
- SNK European Democrats

==== Second round ====
- Petr Fiala, incumbent Prime Minister
- Markéta Pekarová Adamová, incumbent President of the Chamber of Deputies
- Vít Rakušan, incumbent First Deputy Prime Minister and Minister of the Interior
- Marian Jurečka, incumbent Deputy Prime Minister and Minister of Labour and Social Affairs
- Michal Horáček, candidate in 2018
- Miroslav Kalousek, former Minister of Finance
- Mirek Topolánek, former Prime Minister
- Jiří Rusnok, former Prime Minister
- Danuše Nerudová
- Pavel Fischer
- Marek Hilšer
- Karel Diviš

Parties

- Czech Social Democratic Party
- Green Party
- Hlas
- Mayors and Independents
- Mayors for the Liberec Region
- Volt Czech Republic

=== Non-political ===
- Zlata Adamovská, actress.
- Tomáš Halík, Priest and University professor.
- Radek Banga, singer.
- Petr Čtvrtníček, actor and comedian.
- Jitka Čvančarová, actress.
- Martin Dejdar, actor.
- Kristýna Frejová, actress.
- Eva Holubová, actress.
- Vavřinec Hradilek slalom canoeist.
- Jan Hřebejk, film director.
- Jaroslav Hutka, musician, composer, songwriter, and democracy and human rights activist.
- Daniela Kolářová, actress.
- Taťána Kuchařová, dancer, model and beauty queen who won the title of Miss World 2006.
- Janek Ledecký, singer.
- Václav Marhoul, film director.
- Ondřej Pavelka, actor.
- Dagmar Pecková, operatic mezzo-soprano.
- Tomáš Plekanec, ice hockey player.
- Vladimír Polívka, actor.
- Liběna Rochová, fashion designer.
- Eduard Stehlík, historian and writer.
- Zdeněk Svěrák actor, humorist, playwright and scriptwriter.
- Lucie Šafářová, tennis player.
- Milan Šteindler, actor.
- Dominik Hašek, former ice hockey player.
- Jiří Procházka, mixed martial artist.
- Lukáš Vácha, footballer.
- Michal Šlesingr, former biathlete.
- Eva Puskarčíková, former biathlete.
- Jessica Jislová, biathlete.

== Josef Středula (withdrawn) ==
=== Political ===
- Vojtěch Filip, former leader of the Communist Party of Bohemia and Moravia

Parties

- Czech Social Democratic Party

=== Non-political ===
- Tomáš Enge, car racer.
- Pavel Šaradín, political scientist.

== Tomáš Zima ==
=== Political ===
- Vojtěch Filip, former leader of the Communist Party of Bohemia and Moravia

=== Non-political ===
- Jiří Malúš, businessman.
