= 2016 Communist Party of Bohemia and Moravia leadership election =

- 14 May 2016
- Turnout: 89.8%
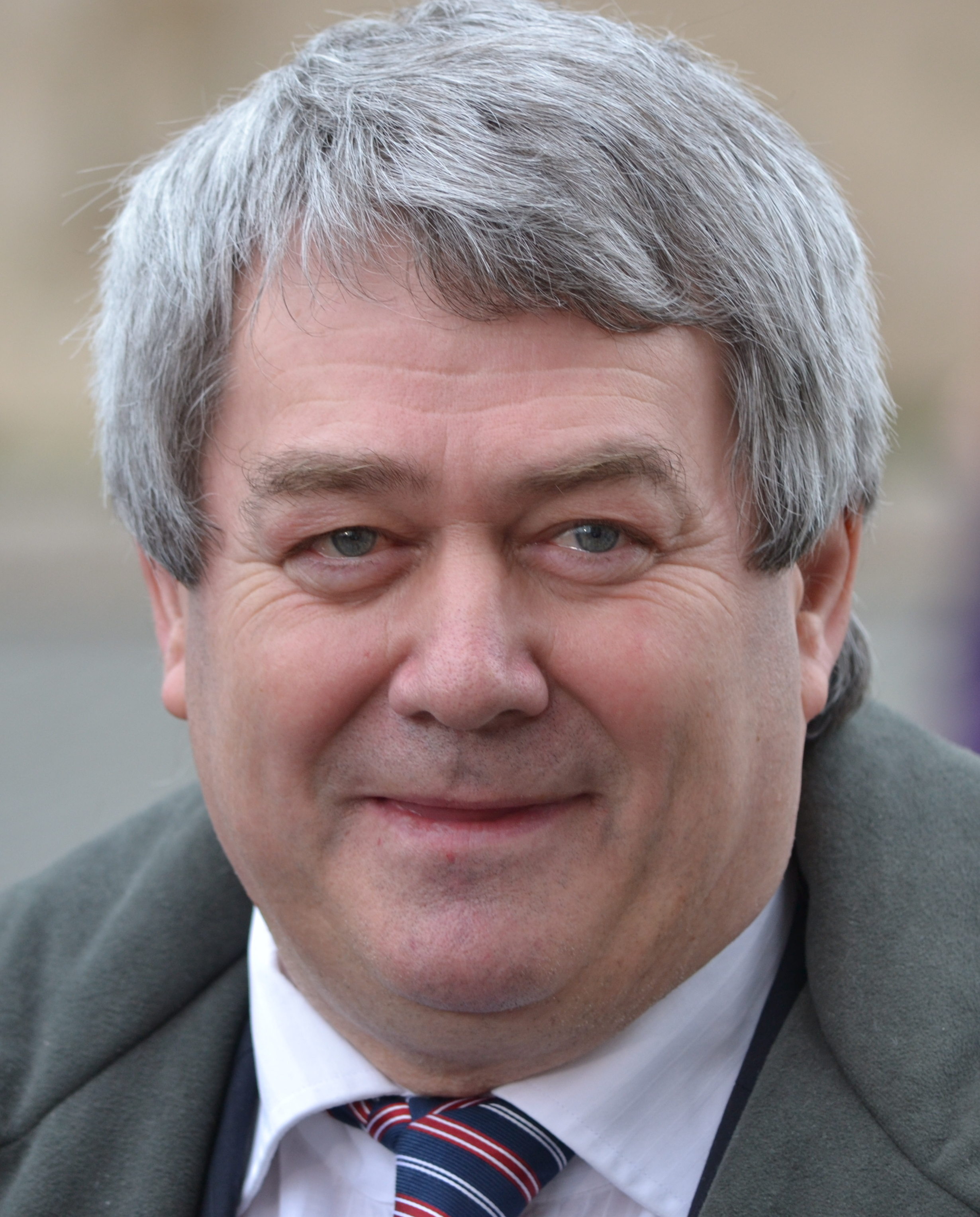

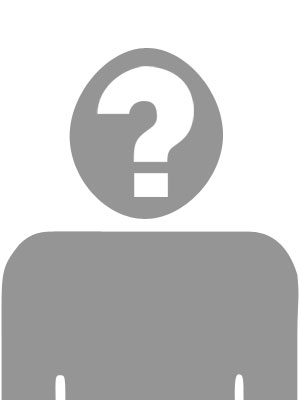
Candidate	Vojtěch Filip	Josef Skála
Electoral vote	203	155
Percentage	56.7%	43.3%
Leader of KSČM before election
Vojtěch Filip
Elected Leader of KSČM
Vojtěch Filip

The Communist Party of Bohemia and Moravia (KSČM) held a leadership election in May 2016. Incumbent Vojtěch Filip sought re-election. Other candidates included Josef Skála and Ivan Hrůza. Hrůza suspended his candidature before the voting started and endorsed Skála. Skála was considered the candidate of radical members of KSČM.

Filip won the election and was elected for another four years. Skála's candidature was called a revolution attempt of orthodox communists.

== Result ==
Candidate	Votes	%
Vojtěch Filip	203	56.70%
Josef Skála	155	43.30%
