= 2026 ANO 2011 leadership election =

Czech party leadership election

- 24 January 2026
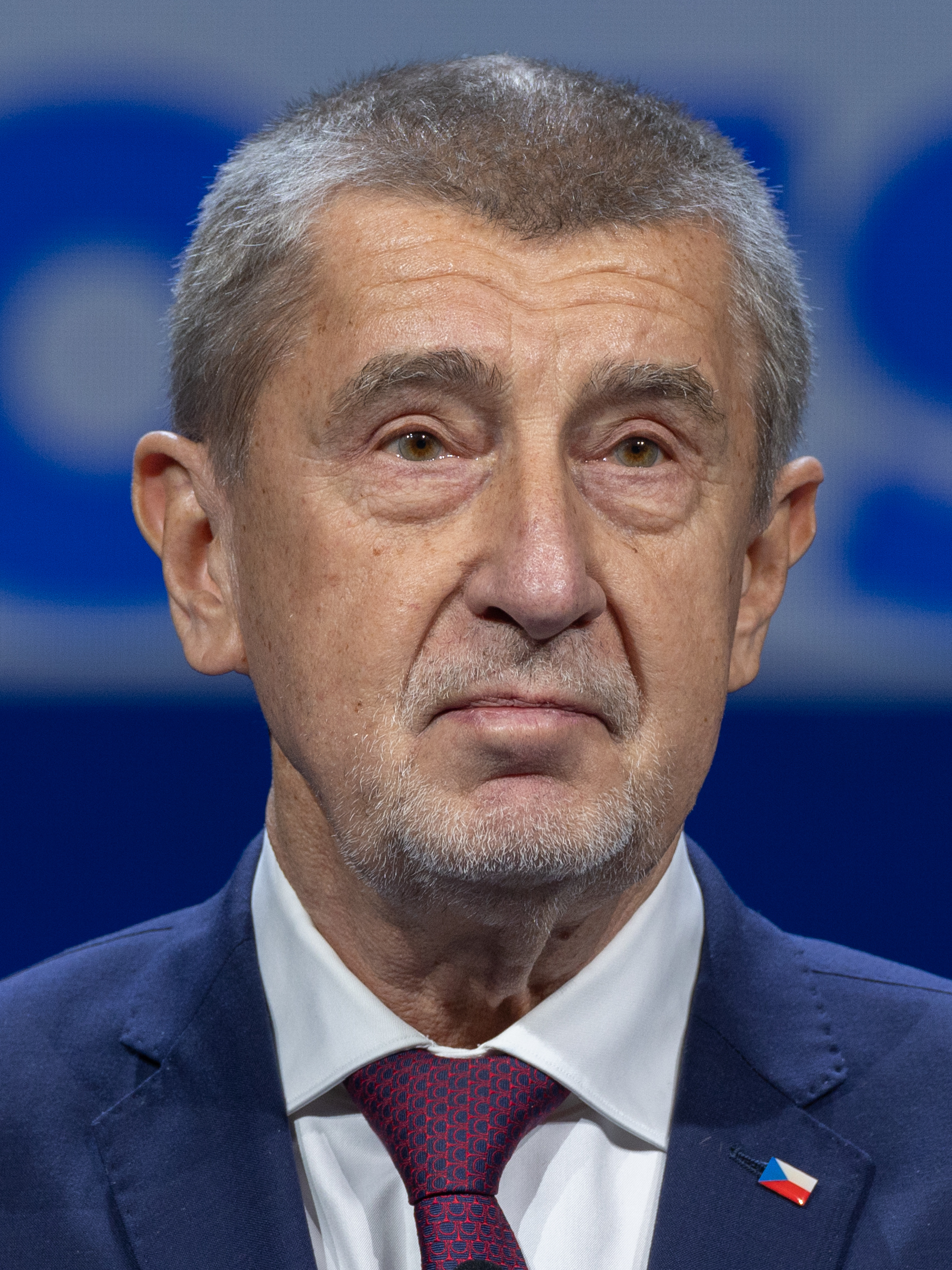
| Candidate | Andrej Babiš |
| Electoral vote | 196 |
| Percentage | 94% |
leader of ANO 2011 before election
Andrej Babiš
Elected leader of ANO 2011
Andrej Babiš

The leadership election for ANO 2011 was held on 24 January 2026. The incumbent leader Andrej Babiš won unopposed.

== Background ==
Andrej Babiš led the party since establishment of the party in 2011. Under his leadership the party won 2025 parliamentary election and Babiš became Prime Minister of the Czech Republic again.

Babiš decided to run for another term.

== Candidates ==
- Andrej Babiš, Prime Minister of the Czech Republic and incumbent leader.

== Voting ==
209 delegates were allowed to vote. Babiš was the only candidate, he received 196 votes and thus was reelected.

Result
| Candidate | Votes | % |
|---|---|---|
| Andrej Babiš | 196 | 93.8% |
| Abstained | 11 | 5.3% |
| Against | 2 | 0.9% |
