= ANO 2011 =

Political party in the Czech Republic

- Leader: Andrej Babiš
- Deputy Leaders: Karel Havlíček; Richard Brabec; Alena Schillerová; Radek Vondráček
- Chamber of Deputies Leader: Taťána Malá
- Senate Leader: Jana Mračková Vildumetzová
- European Parliament Leader: Klára Dostálová
- Founder: Andrej Babiš
- Founded: 11 May 2012; 14 years ago
- Headquarters: Babická 2329/2, Prague
- Think tank: Institute for Politics and Society
- Youth wing: Young ANO
- Membership (2026): 3,087
- Ideology: Right-wing populism
- Political position: Right-wing to far-right
- European affiliation: Patriots.eu (since 2024) (Note: The party was formerly part of the ALDE Party (2014–2024).)
- European Parliament group: Patriots for Europe (since 2024) (Note: The party was formerly part of Renew Europe (2019–2024) and ALDE Group (2014–2019).)
- Colours: Indigo
- Slogan: Ano, bude líp ('Yes, things will get better')
- Chamber of Deputies: 76 / 200
- Senate: 11 / 81
- European Parliament: 7 / 21
- Regional councils: 292 / 675
- Governors of the regions: 8 / 13
- Local councils: 1,692 / 61,892
- Prague City Assembly: 14 / 65

Website
- anobudelip.cz

ANO (Note: Akce Nespokojených Občanů (lit. 'Action of Dissatisfied Citizens')) (lit. 'Yes'), registered as ANO 2011, is a right-wing populist political party in the Czech Republic led by businessman and current Prime Minister Andrej Babiš. Formed in 2011, the party finished second in the first elections it contested in 2013, entering government as a junior partner to the Czech Social Democratic Party (ČSSD) led by Prime Minister Bohuslav Sobotka. After large gains in the 2017 election, these two parties switched places, with Babiš becoming prime minister in an ANO-led government with the Social Democrats as the junior partner, plus external support from the Communist Party of Bohemia and Moravia, a post-revolution first for the country. ANO was narrowly defeated in the 2021 election by the Spolu coalition and went into opposition for the first time. The party has performed consistently strongly in Czech elections since 2013, winning every European Parliament election it has entered, and participating in regional and municipal administrations around the country.

The party's ideological character is contested by political scientists, although it is widely considered to be populist in nature. After being formed predominantly as an anti-corruption vehicle, the party has at different times been considered centrist, liberal, conservative, right-wing, social democratic, or centre-left, by different commentators, leading to a further characterisation as a syncretic or catch-all party. Since the 2024 European Parliament election, the party has positioned itself to the right, co-founding Patriots for Europe, a group in the European Parliament that is made up of Eurosceptic parties that primarily adhere to right-wing populism and national conservatism.

In December 2025, ANO formed a majority coalition government in the Czech Republic with Freedom and Direct Democracy and Motorists for Themselves.

== History ==
=== Foundation ===
The party's founding was preceded by interventions from leader and founder Andrej Babiš commenting on systemic corruption in the Czech political system. It was established as an association in November 2011 under the name Action of Dissatisfied Citizens (Czech: Akce nespokojených občanů), and formally registered as a political party in the Czech Republic under the name ANO 2011 on 11 May 2012. In the 2013 parliamentary election held on 25 and 26 October, ANO won 18.7% of the vote and 47 seats in the Chamber of Deputies, finishing in second place behind the Social Democrats.

=== First government participation (2014–2017) ===
On 29 January 2014, the Cabinet of Social Democrat Prime Minister Bohuslav Sobotka was sworn in, with ANO and the Christian and Democratic Union – Czechoslovak People's Party (KDU-ČSL) as junior coalition partners. On 24–25 May 2014, ANO came first in the 2014 European Parliament election, winning 16.13% of votes and four seats. The party joined the Alliance of Liberals and Democrats for Europe (ALDE) group in the European Parliament. On 10 September 2014, ANO member Věra Jourová was named European Commissioner for Justice, Consumers and Gender Equality in the Juncker Commission. On 21 November 2014, ANO was granted full membership of the Alliance of Liberals and Democrats for Europe Party (ALDE Party) at a congress in Lisbon.

In the 2014 senate and municipal elections held on 10–11 October 2014, ANO won four seats in the Senate, and was the largest party in 8 of the 10 biggest cities in the Czech Republic, including Prague. The party took mayoral offices in the three largest cities (Prague, Brno and Ostrava), and Adriana Krnáčová became the first female mayor of Prague. However, many of the municipal coalitions involving ANO subsequently dissolved due to disagreements within the party.

In the run-up to the 2016 Czech regional elections, Babiš started Babiš's Cafe, a television show consisting of interviews with Babiš by Pavla Charvátová, as well as viewers' questions. Two parties split from ANO citing a lack of democracy and discussion within the party: Change for People and PRO 2016 (English: FOR 2016), the latter of which was joined by numerous local councillors and mayors from ANO. Some of those leaving attributed their departure to conflicts related to candidate selection, alleging that the main criterion for candidates to regional councils was loyalty, rather than ability. ANO also lost one MP in July 2016 when Kristýna Zelienková left the party.

ANO won the 2016 regional elections and the first round of the 2016 senate election. The party came first in nine regions and second in the other four regions; its victory in South Bohemia was particularly unexpected. ANO emerged from the election with five governors, one of whom, the Karlovy Vary Governor Jana Vildumetzová, became chair of the Association of Regions. Three ANO candidates were elected in the second round of the senate election, considered a disappointing result for the party. On 11 October 2017, MEP Pavel Telička announced his departure from the party. Another MEP, Petr Ježek, left ANO on 23 January 2018.

=== Minority government (2017–2021) ===
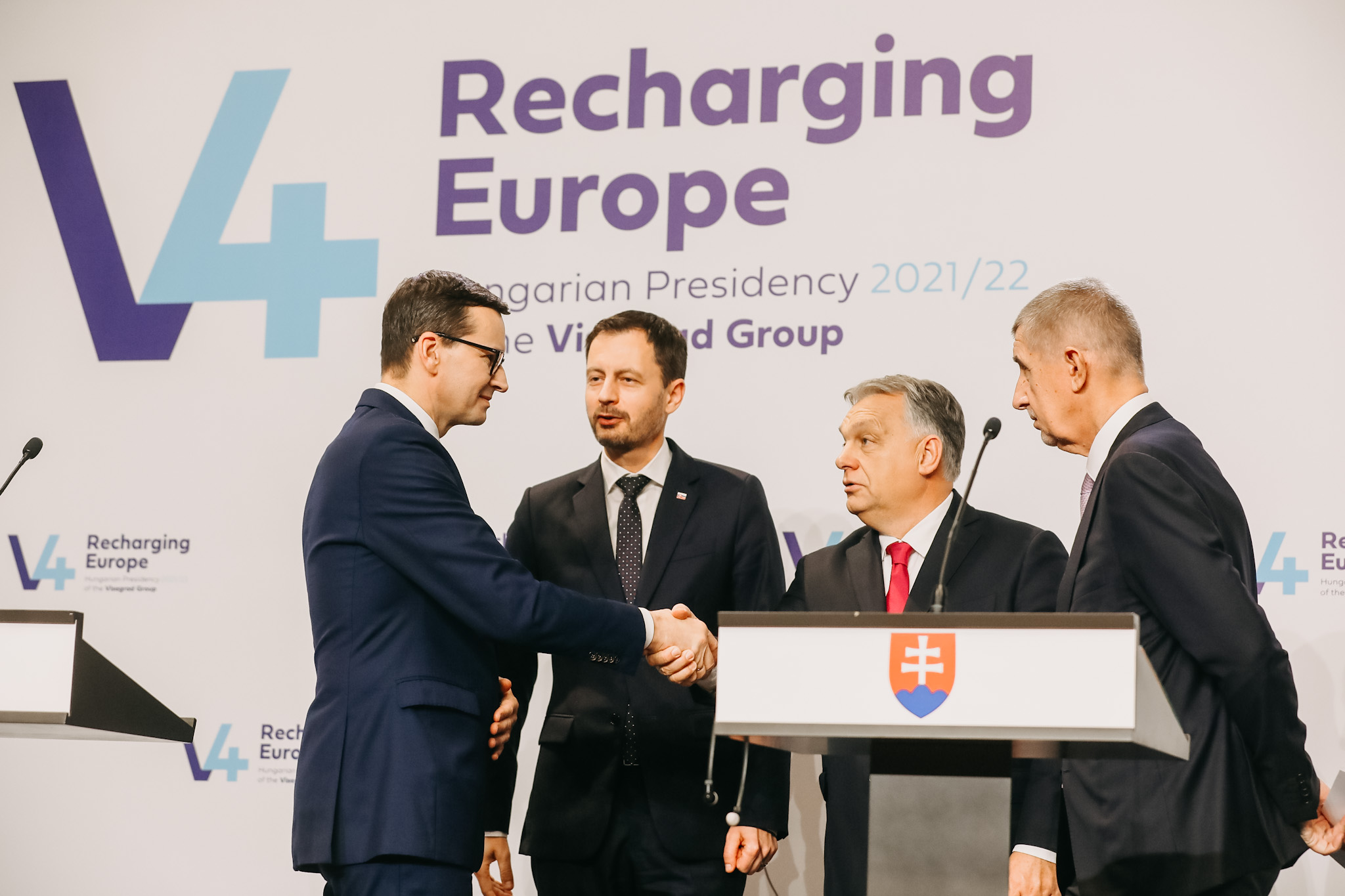
Prime Minister Andrej Babiš meeting with the leaders of the Visegrád Group countries in Budapest in November 2021

On 20–21 October 2017, ANO won the 2017 Czech parliamentary election with 29.6% of the vote. ANO formed the short-lived first Babiš government with independent ministers on 13 December 2017, failing a vote of confidence on 16 January 2018. On 12 July 2018 the second Babiš government was formed, with the Social Democrats participating as the junior coalition partner. The cabinet received external support from the Communist Party of Bohemia and Moravia.

In the 2018 Czech municipal elections, the party again came first, but lost its mayoral offices of Prague and Brno to the Czech Pirate Party and the Civic Democratic Party (ODS), respectively. In May 2019, ANO came first in the 2019 European Parliament election with 21.2% of the vote, returning six MEPs. In the 2020 Cezch regional elections, the party lost two governors' offices, but joined various regional coalitions, forming a cordon sanitaire against the Communist Party and the far-right Freedom and Direct Democracy.

=== Opposition (2021–2025) ===
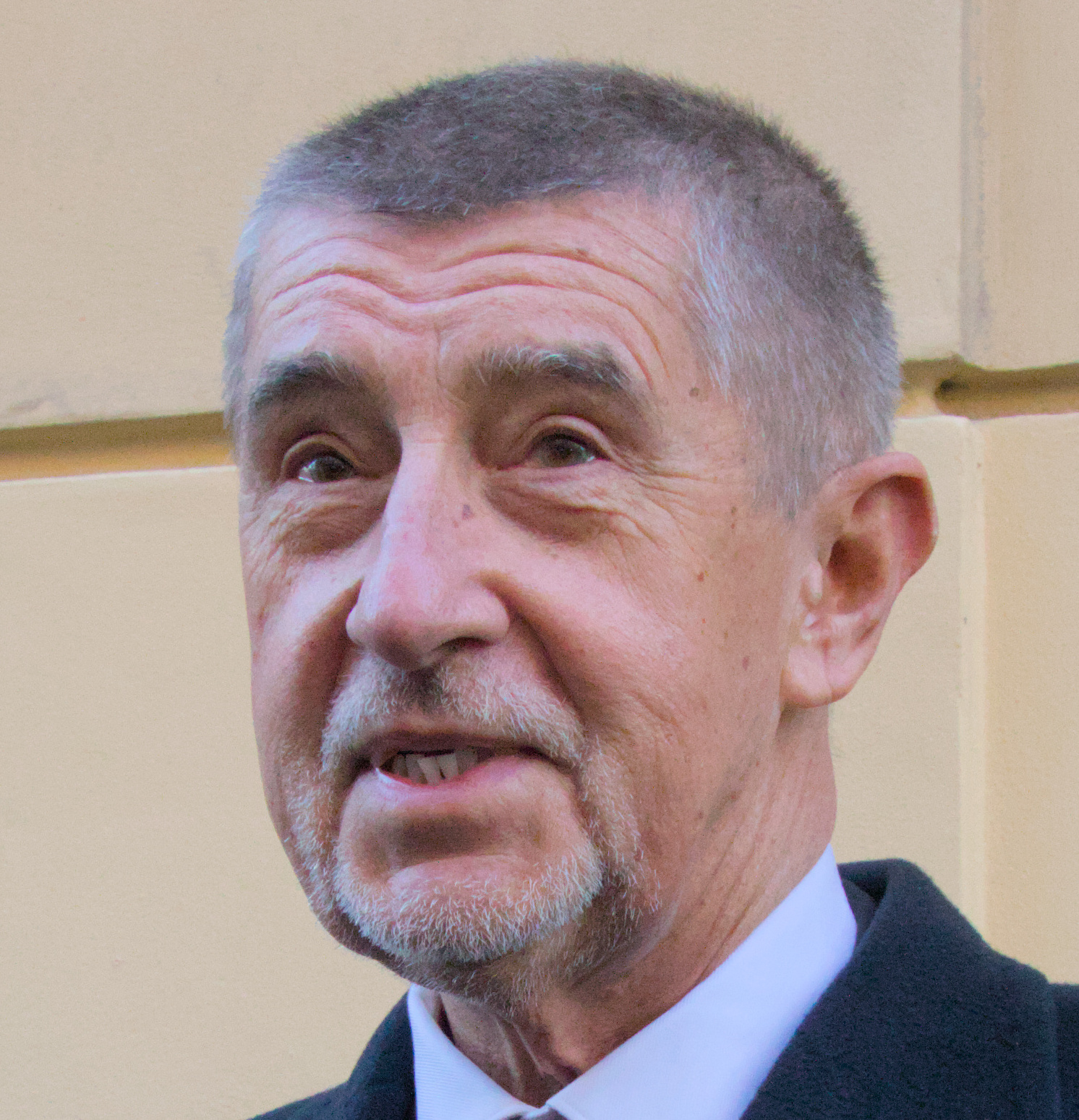
ANO founder and leader Andrej Babiš in November 2023

ANO went into the 2021 Czech parliamentary election leading in opinion polls, but finished second behind the Spolu coalition, though with a higher number of seats. Following the 2024 European Parliament election on 21 June 2024, the party unilaterally withdrew from both the Alliance of Liberals and Democrats for Europe Party and Renew Europe group. On 30 June 2024, Babiš launched the Patriots for Europe, along with Prime Minister of Hungary and Fidesz party leader Viktor Orbán and Freedom Party of Austria leader Herbert Kickl. Patriots for Europe reached the criteria for becoming a European Parliament group on 8 July. ANO won the 2025 Czech parliamentary election and subsequently entered negotiations to form a government with Freedom and Direct Democracy and Motorists for Themselves.

=== Coalition government (2025–present) ===
ANO negotiated a coalition with the far-right Freedom and Direct Democracy (SPD) and the national-conservative Motorists for Themselves (AUTO). The government was sworn in on 15 December 2025.

On 24 January 2026, Babiš was re-elected unopposed as ANO leader, with 196 out of 209 votes (94%).

In the 2026 Czech Senate election, 13 ANO candidates advanced to the second round of voting, but none of them were elected to the Senate. Babiš described the result as "catastrophic". On 27 October 2026, MP David Pražák announced his departure from the party on Facebook after being a member for eleven years.

== Ideology and platform ==
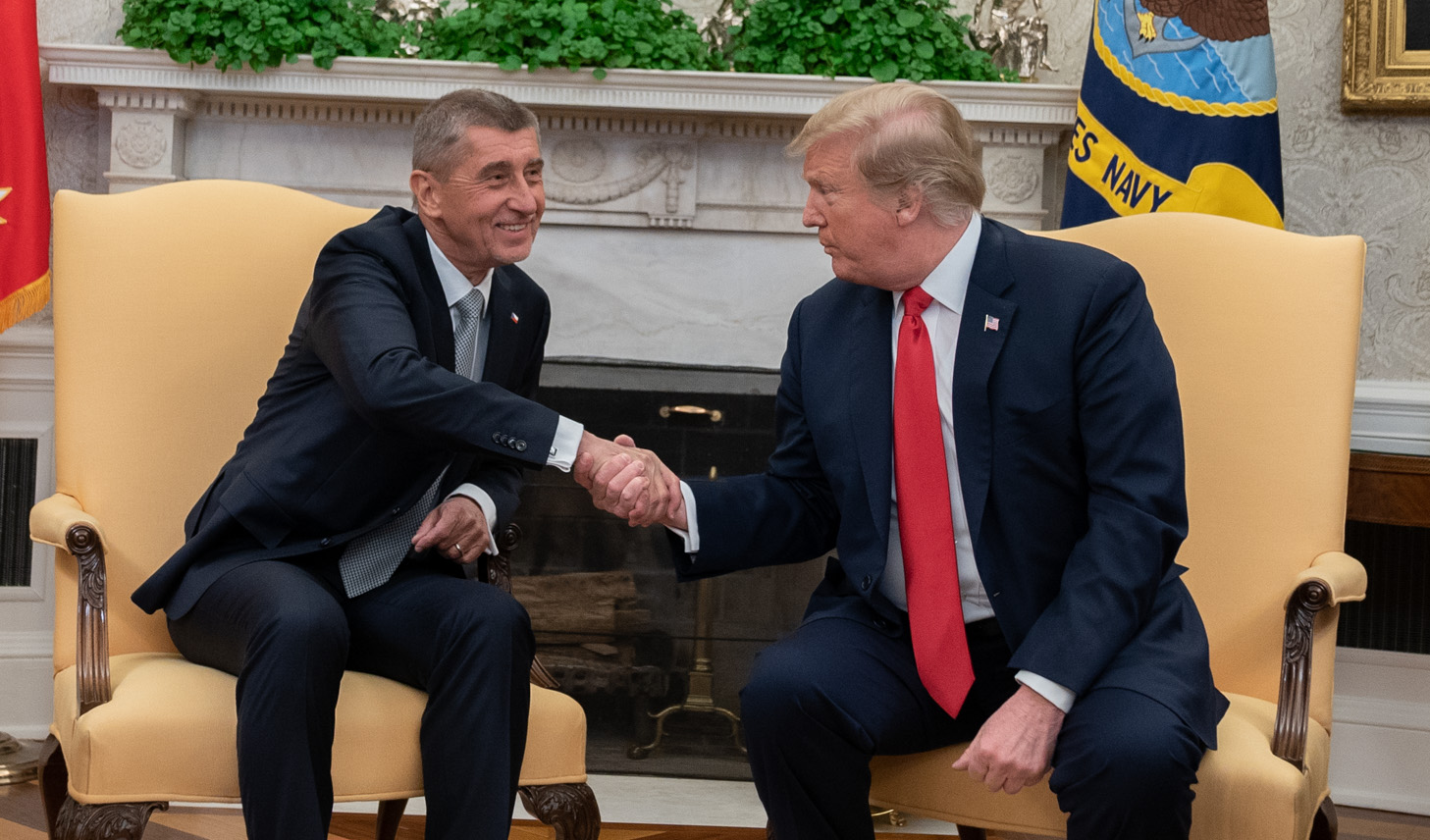
Andrej Babiš visiting Donald Trump at the White House in March 2019

ANO's political position is debated among politicians and political scientists. Political scientists historically placed ANO in the centre, or centre-right, while in latter years the party focused on left-leaning voters and promoted policies described as centre-left, or even left-wing, until 2024. Bne IntelliNews evaluated ANO as taking a right-wing direction after it left Alliance of Liberals and Democrats for Europe Party (ALDE Party) and Renew Europe in 2024, while others have described the party as conservative, centre-right populist, and right-wing populist. Babiš himself stated in an interview in 2014 that ANO was "a right-wing party with social empathy".

ANO's ideology was widely described as simply populist until 2023. ANO 2011 has also been characterised as technocratic, techno-populist, syncretic, and a big tent or catch-all party. Given its former membership in the ALDE Party and Renew Europe, which mostly comprise liberal parties, ANO has also historically been described as liberal, conservative-liberal, centre-right liberal, liberal-conservative, and liberal-populist. Ideologically, the party had similarities with the Christian and Democratic Union – Czechoslovak People's Party (KDU-ČSL), as well as the now-defunct Public Affairs. Additionally, ANO, or more specifically Babiš, has been compared to Silvio Berlusconi from Forza Italia or US president Donald Trump.

Multiple candidates that were elected for the party have left ANO since 2014, asserting that it is no longer a liberal party. After the 2017 Czech parliamentary election, ANO formed a minority government with support from the Communist Party of Bohemia and Moravia (KSČM), ending the cordon sanitaire against them. Following the 2021 Czech parliamentary election, Euronews speculated that ANO may try to position itself as a left-wing populist opposition party in order to absorb votes from the Czech Social Democratic Party, KSČM, and Přísaha, all of which remained outside of parliament after failing to cross the required 5% threshold. KSČM also endorsed Babiš in the 2023 Czech presidential election. ANO has gradually shifted to the right. In early 2023, many from the party leadership signalled the party's shift towards conservatism, both socially and fiscally, as Babiš was cooperating with Hungarian prime minister Viktor Orbán and the Conservative Political Action Conference (CPAC). The agenda for the party's 2023 conference specifically stated Babiš to be a "conservative leader". The ANO leadership has also criticised the centre-right Civic Democratic Party (ODS), claiming that it is no longer right-wing but is instead in the "progressive camp" with the Czech Pirate Party.

=== Domestic policy ===
ANO generally opposes economic liberalism. In some spheres, such as tax policy, Babiš introduced centre-left elements to the movement's politics, including the abolition of the partial tax exemption for self-employed persons and restoration of the partial tax exemption for employed pensioners. He also introduced a proposal to increase school teacher wages by 2.5%, as opposed to his ministry's original proposal for a 1% increase. In the area of healthcare, Babiš has criticised public health insurance companies for their level of spending.

=== Foreign policy ===
Babiš speaking at the 2025 Patriots.eu summit
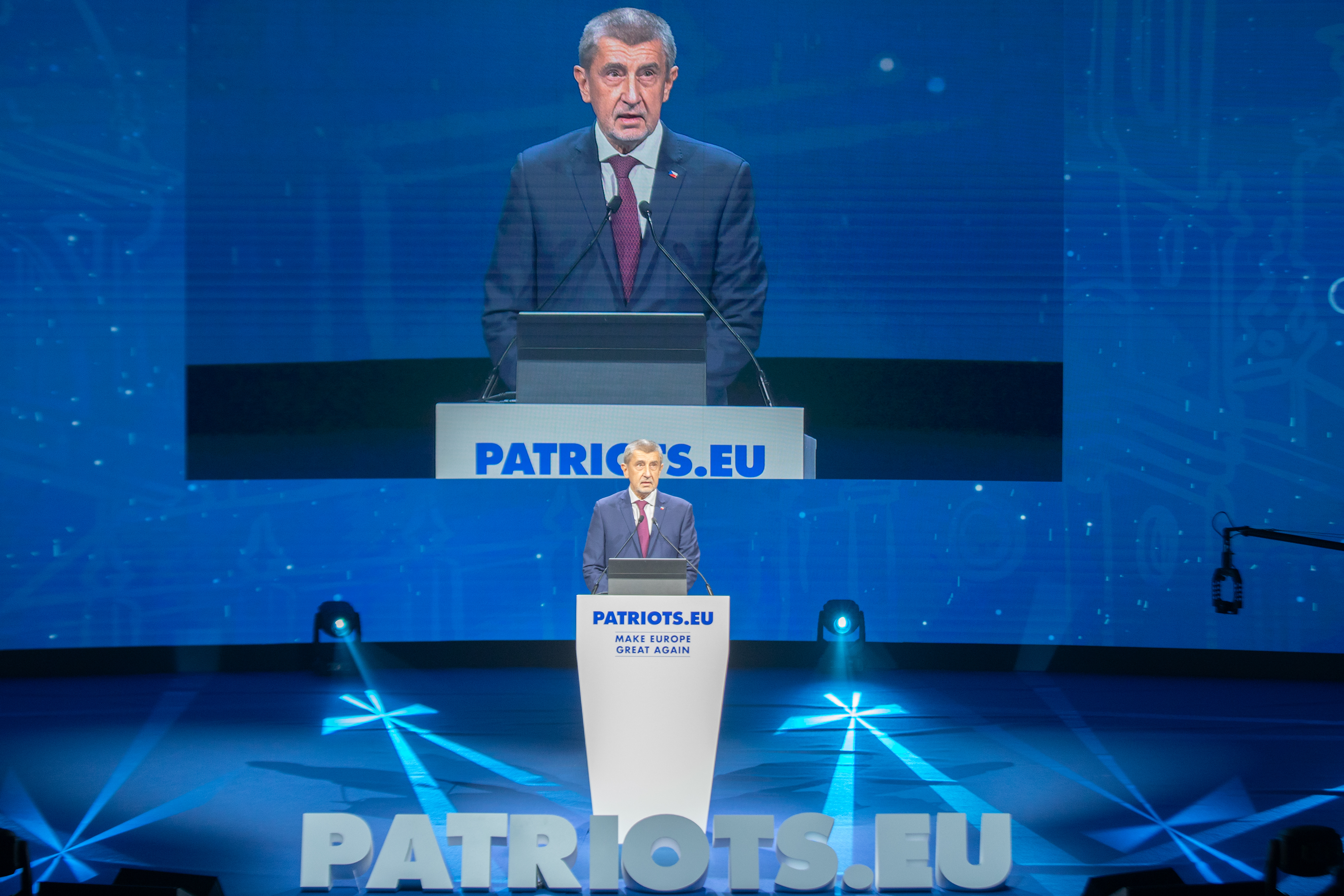
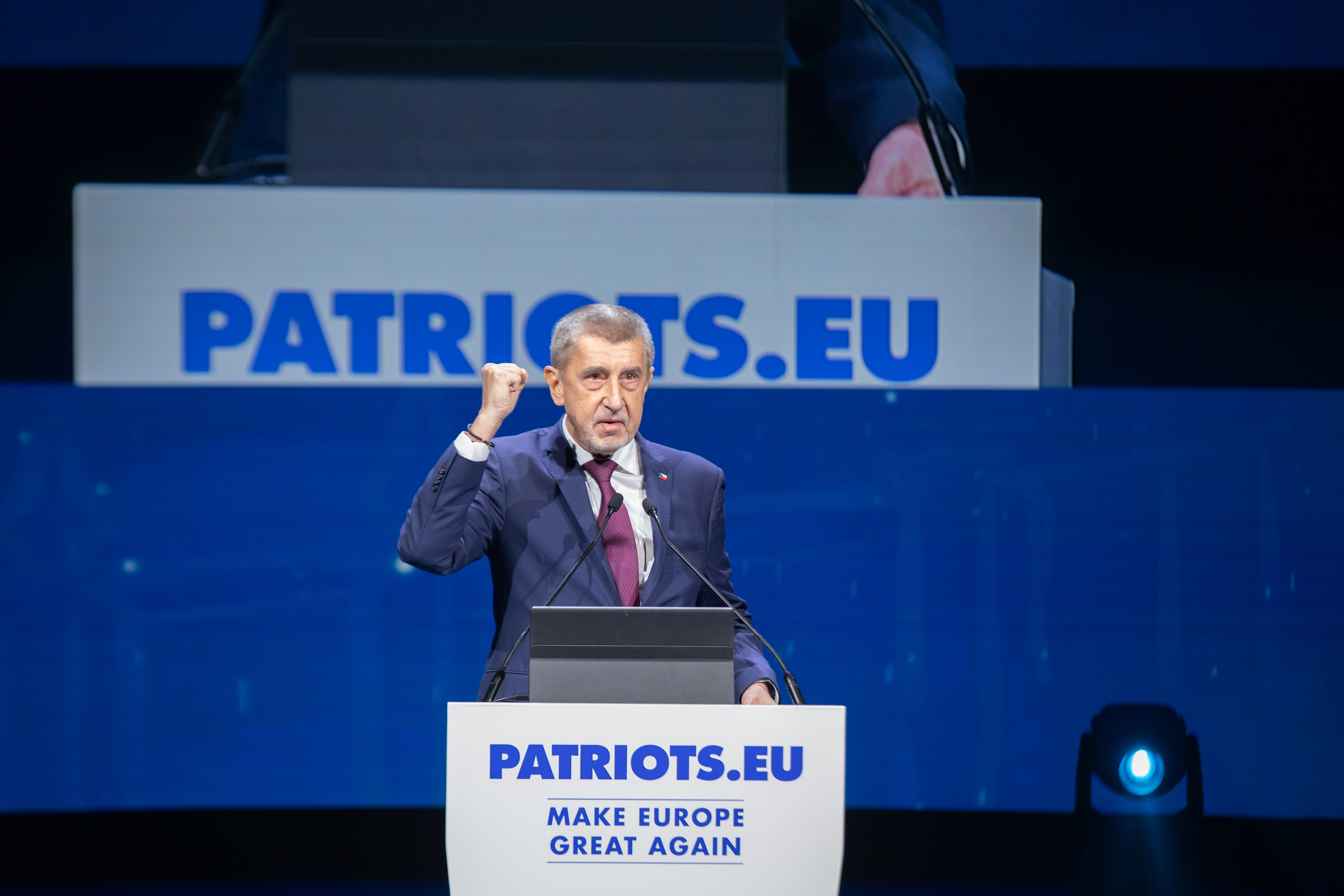

ANO is generally described as a Eurosceptic or a soft Eurosceptic party. Daniel Kaiser of Echo24 called the party's stance towards the EU "Euro-opportunism". Babiš stated that ANO opposes the Czech Republic's adoption of the Euro, further European integration, immigration quotas, and "Brussels bureaucracy". Babiš stated later that he was open to adopting the euro once the Czech Republic had a balanced budget. He also argued in favour of closer ties with Germany and said the Czech Republic was already ready to sign the Fiscal Compact treaty at the time of the interview in 2014.

Although ANO initially supported military aid to Ukraine following the 2022 Russian invasion of Ukraine, by June 2022, Babiš was calling for an end to Czech military aid, stating that the objective of preventing a Russian takeover of the entirety of Ukraine had been achieved. During his 2023 Czech presidential election campaign, Babiš advocated for negotiations between Russia and Ukraine to end the Russo-Ukrainian War, criticising his opponent's absolute support for Ukraine. Babiš has also opposed potential Ukrainian EU membership, describing it as a "complete catastrophe".

In 2026, Babiš confirmed that the ammunition initiative for Ukraine would continue, having previously criticised the scheme as opaque and called for it to be audited or scrapped.

== Organization ==
=== Structure ===
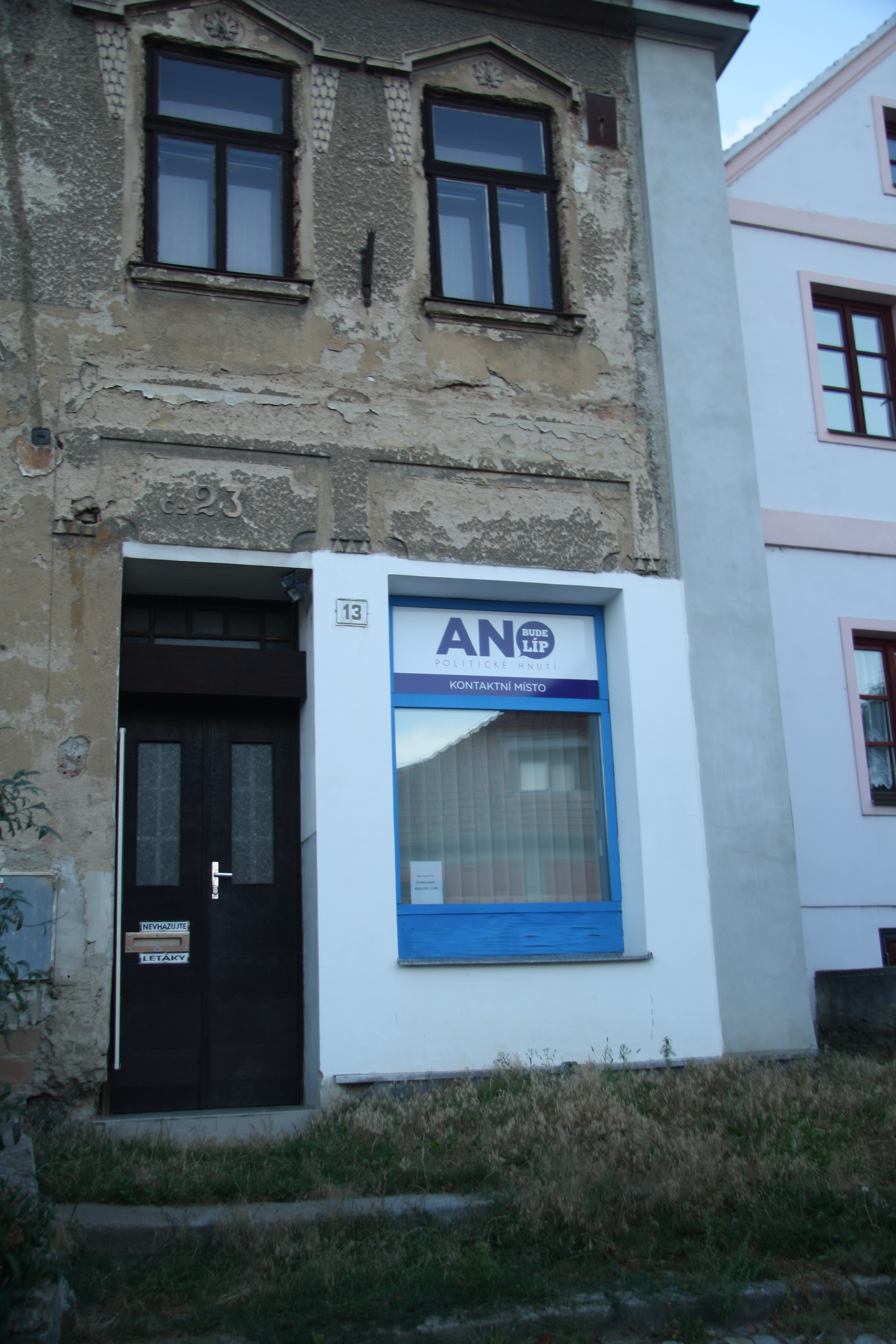
ANO 2011 headquarters in Třebíč, Třebíč District

ANO has a highly centralised organisational structure. The strongest position is that of the chair, who acts independently when representing the party. The highest body of ANO is its National Assembly, which meets at least once every two years. Other national offices include membership of the Party Committee and the Bureau. The Bureau is led by the chair. Regional assemblies can elect their own chairs; however, they must be approved by the Bureau before they can take office. The Bureau also approves all candidates for elections. For these reasons, and considering Babiš's businesses, it has been described as a business-firm party.

=== Associated organizations ===
The Institute for Politics and Society, founded in October 2014, is a think tank affiliated with ANO. In March 2015, journalist Jan Macháček became the chairman of the institute.

=== Youth wing ===
Young ANO, the party's youth wing, was established on 1 May 2015, with Kateřina Reiblová as the inaugural leader. She resigned in July 2015, with Babiš stating that she was disgusted by the media. She was replaced by Tomáš Krátký, who was elected as chair during the organisation's first convention.

=== European affiliation ===
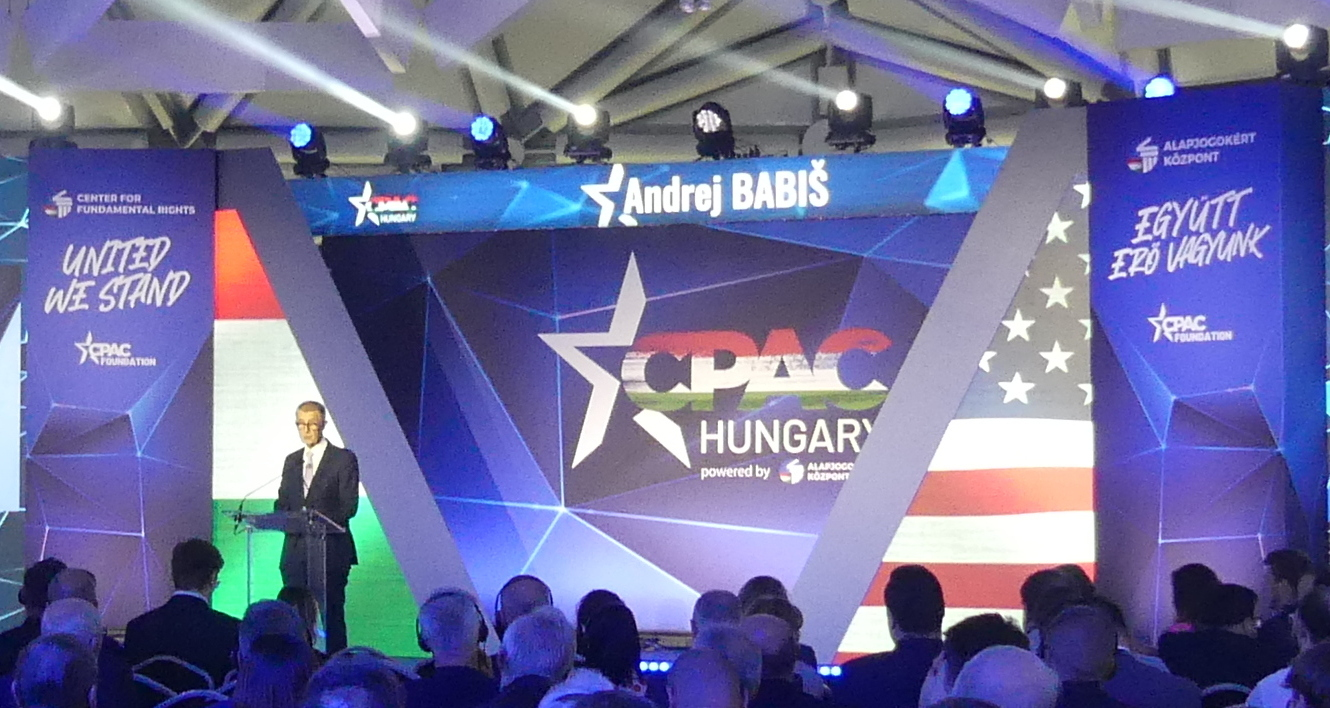
ANO leader, Andrej Babiš, speaking at the 2023 Conservative Political Action Conference (CPAC) in Hungary

ANO joined the Alliance of Liberals and Democrats for Europe (ALDE) group in June 2014, and the Alliance of Liberals and Democrats for Europe Party (ALDE party) in November 2014. ANO was described variously as "a headache" and a "thorn in the side" for the liberal group. Other members of these groups criticised Babiš and questioned his commitment to the ethos of these organisations due to Babiš being invited to, attending, and speaking at the Conservative Political Action Conference (CPAC) in Budapest, Hungary, in May 2023.

During the 2023 Slovak parliamentary election, Babiš expressed support for Robert Fico's Smer–SD and Peter Pellegrini's Hlas-SD in Slovakia, over ALDE member Progressive Slovakia. In June 2024, ANO unilaterally resigned from both the ALDE party and its affiliated Renew Europe group in the European Parliament. On 30 June 2024, ANO, the Freedom Party of Austria and Hungarian party Fidesz launched the new group Patriots for Europe, which was officially formed on 8 July, replacing the Identity and Democracy group at the European political level.

== Election results ==
=== Chamber of Deputies ===
Election	Leader	Votes	%	Seats	+/–	Position	Status
2013	Andrej Babiš	927,240	18.65	47 / 200	New	▲2nd	Coalition
2017	Andrej Babiš	1,500,113	29.64	78 / 200	▲31	▲1st	Minority (2017–2018)
2017	Andrej Babiš	1,500,113	29.64	78 / 200	▲31	▲1st	Coalition (2018–2021)
2021	Andrej Babiš	1,458,140	27.13	72 / 200	▼6	▼2nd	Opposition
2025	Andrej Babiš	1,940,507	34.52	80 / 200	▲8	▲1st	Coalition

=== Senate ===
Election	Candidates	First round				Second round			Seats	Total seats	+/–
Election	Candidates	Votes	%	Runners-up	Place	Votes	%	Place	Seats	Total seats	+/–
2012	7	14,503	1.65	0 / 27	7th	—N/a			0 / 27	0 / 81	Steady
2014	26	180,136	17.55	9 / 27	2nd	71,739	15.14	3rd	4 / 27	4 / 81	▲4
2016	27	154,594	17.54	14 / 27	1st	92,051	21.71	1st	3 / 27	7 / 81	▲3
2018	22	147,477	13.54	10 / 27	2nd	57,500	13.75	2nd	1 / 27	7 / 81	Steady
2020	18	115,202	11.55	9 / 27	3rd	39,473	8.74	4th	1 / 27	5 / 81	▼2
2022	22	244,516	21.98	19 / 27	1st	244,516	31.12	1st	3 / 27	5 / 81	Steady
2024	23	224,350	28.27	19 / 27	1st	157,287	40.27	1st	8 / 27	12 / 81	▲7
2026	24	259,202	22.45	13 / 27	1st	102,148	21.58	3rd	0 / 27	11 / 81	▼1

=== Presidency ===
Election	Candidate	First round			Second round		
Election	Candidate	Votes	%	Result	Votes	%	Result
2023	Andrej Babiš	1,952,213	34.99	Runner-up	2,400,271	41.67	Lost

=== European Parliament ===
Election	List leader	Votes	%	Seats	+/−	EP Group
2014	Pavel Telička	244,501	16.13 (#1)	4 / 22	New	ALDE
2019	Dita Charanzová	502,343	21.18 (#1)	6 / 21	▲2	RE
2024	Klára Dostálová	776,158	26.12 (#1)	7 / 21	▲1	PfE

=== Regional councils ===
Election	Vote	%	Seats
2016	533,061	21.05	176 / 675
2020	604,441	21.83	178 / 675
2024	842,947	35.38	292 / 675

=== Local ===
Election	%	Councillors
2014	14.6	1,600
2018	14.9	1,692
2022		1,748
2026	14.3	1,650

=== Prague City Assembly ===
Election	Leader	Votes	%	Seats	+/–	Position	Status
2014	Adriana Krnáčová	4,574,610	22.1	17 / 65	New	▲1st	Coalition
2018	Petr Stuchlík	3,893,968	15.4	12 / 65	▼5	▼5th	Opposition
2022	Patrik Nacher	4,559,782	19.3	14 / 65	▲2	▲2nd	Opposition
2026	Jan Hušbauer	3,530,200	14.4	11 / 65	▼3	▼4th	Opposition

== See also ==
- List of political parties in the Czech Republic
