= Kateřina Konečná =

Member of the European Parliament for the Czech Republic (2004; since 2014)

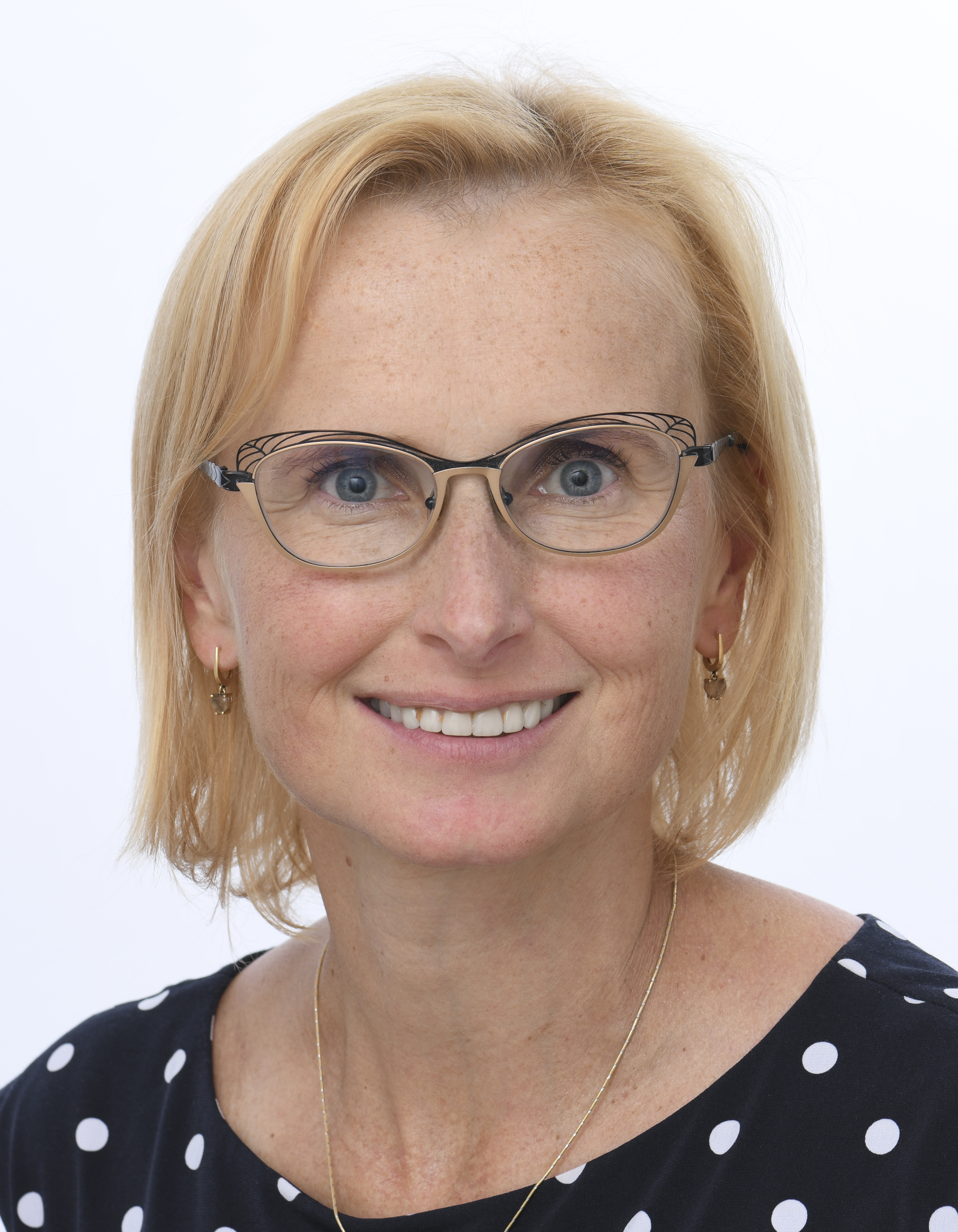
- Official portrait, 2024

Leader of the Communist Party of Bohemia and Moravia
- In office 23 October 2021 – 30 May 2026
- Preceded by: Vojtěch Filip
- Succeeded by: Roman Roun

Member of the European Parliament for the Czech Republic
- Incumbent
- Assumed office 1 July 2014
- In office 1 May 2004 – 19 July 2004

Member of the Chamber of Deputies of the Czech Republic
- In office 26 October 2013 – 30 June 2014
- In office 15 June 2002 – 28 August 2013

Personal details
- Born: 20 January 1981 (age 45) Nový Jičín, Czechoslovakia
- Party: Patriots for Europe (since 2026)
- Other political affiliations: Communist Party of Bohemia and Moravia (2005–2026); Stačilo! (2024–2026)
- Spouse: Zdenek Trefil (m. 2008)
- Children: 1
- Education: Masaryk University, University of Finance and Administration
- Occupation: Lawyer • Politician
- Website: http://www.konecna.cz/

Kateřina Konečná (born 20 January 1981) is a Czech politician who was the leader of the Communist Party of Bohemia and Moravia (KSČM) from 23 October 2021 to 30 May 2026. She has been a Member of the European Parliament since 2014, sitting for the majority of that time with The Left political group. On 21 October 2026, Konečná announced that she had joined the far-right Patriots for Europe group in the European Parliament.

== Early life and education ==
Konečná was born in Nový Jičín in 1981. She comes from a communist family, and was introduced to politics when she was young by her parents. Her father, Karel Konečný, worked as secretary for agriculture in Nový Jičín before 1989. Konečná graduated from Masaryk University's Department of Economics and Administration in 2003. In 2009 she received a degree in engineering from the University of Finance and Administration. In 2013, Konečná obtained a law degree from Masaryk University.

== Political career ==
In 2000, Konečná was a member of the five-member committee founding the Young Democrats party. In the 2002 Czech parliamentary election, she was elected to the Chamber of Deputies as a non-party candidate for the Moravian-Silesian Region electoral district, becoming the youngest member of parliament. In 2005, she joined KSČM and was re-elected in the 2006 elections. Konečná held the post of vice-chairman of the foreign affairs committee and was also vice-chairman of the environment committee. Within KSČM, she managed the department of the environment and the cross-cutting department of youth.

Konečná stood unsuccessfully for KSČM in the 2006 Czech municipal elections, for the Starý Jičín municipal council, but was elected to the Nový Jičín city council in the 2010 elections. She defended her seat in 2014, 2018, and 2022. Before the 10th KSČM congress in Nymburk on 21 April 2018, Konečná unsuccessfully challenged Vojtěch Filip as leader of the party. Konečná held the post of vice-president until April 2021, when she resigned and was replaced by Milan Krajča. On 23 October 2021, Konečná was elected the first chairwoman of the Communist Party of Bohemia and Moravia, replacing the long-time chairman Vojtěch Filip. In October 2025, Konečná resigned after the Stačilo! alliance failed to meet the 5% threshold in the 2025 parliamentary election. On 30 May 2026, she was replaced by Roman Roun.

In the European Parliament, Konečná sat with the left-wing GUE/NGL group first in 2004 and again in 2014, remaining there until her fourth mandate in 2024, when she left the group to sit with the non-attached members. In October 2026, Konečná announced that she had joined the far-right Patriots for Europe group. Her decision triggered significant internal backlash within the Communist Party. Vice-chair Milan Krajča openly condemned the move, stating that the decision had not been discussed with the party leadership. Krajča described the alignment with a right-wing and anti-communist political group as a fundamental political mistake, noting the group's ideological contradictions with KSČM's positions on international policy. The head of the Prague Regional Committee, Petra Prokšanová, stated that no communist should join a political group which supports 'the genocide of the Palestinian people or the destabilization of socialist Cuba'. On the other hand, Konečná's move was welcomed by the vice-chair of Patriots for Europe, ANO 2011 MEP Klára Dostálová. She stated that Konečná had long been defending the interests of Czech citizens in the European Parliament, adding that the Patriots were "focused on common sense rather than ideology". Konečná left KSČM in November 2026.

== Member of the European Parliament ==
In 2004, shortly after the Czech Republic joined the EU and before the subsequent European Parliament elections, Konečná became a "temporary MEP" before the elected Czech MEPs took up their mandate. From 2004 to 2014, she was also included in the Czech delegation to the Parliamentary Assembly of the Council of Europe (PACE). In the 2014 European Parliament elections, Konečná headed the KSČM list and was elected with 28,154 preferential votes. She was re-elected to the parliament in May 2019, and again in June 2024 as lead candidate for the Stačilo! alliance.

Konečná is a member of the Committee on the Internal Market and Consumer Protection, the Committee on Transport and Tourism and the Delegation to the Euronest Parliamentary Assembly. She is also a substitute member of the Committee on the Environment, Public Health and Food Safety, as well as the Delegation to the EU-Serbia Stabilisation and Association Parliamentary Committee.

=== Views on Russia ===
Konečná argues that Russia is not a dangerous state and that Putin only wants to bring peace to Europe, also stating that Putin was "defending his country" with the invasion of Ukraine, the "collective west" started the war, and that Russia is a victim of the war. She has also called for the Czech Republic to withdraw from NATO.

=== Azerbaijani relations ===
Since 2014, Konečná has been a member of the Delegation to the EU-Armenia Parliamentary Partnership Committee, EU-Azerbaijan Parliamentary Cooperation Committee and the EU-Georgia Parliamentary Association Committee. Konečná is mentioned in the Transparency International report revealing the details of the Azerbaijan Laundromat money-laundering scandal. The report noted that she took a pro-Azerbaijan approach in the European Parliament when MEPs criticised Azerbaijan's human rights record in a joint motion for a resolution, titled "Persecution of Human Rights defenders in Azerbaijan".

In 2013, when Konečná was a member of the Czech Republic-Azerbaijan friendship group, she was among the supporters of the resolution "on the 21st anniversary of the Azerbaijan massacre". The resolution was widely criticised on the grounds that it was "biased and did not contribute to the fair relations of the Czech Republic with the region of the South Caucasus". As a member of PACE, Konečná voted against the motion of resolution on political prisoners in Azerbaijan, which was not adopted.

=== Iran relations ===
Since 2022, Konečná is reported to have met with representatives of the Iranian government for undisclosed reasons.

== Personal life ==
Konečná married businessman Zdeněk Trefil on 17 August 2008. She gave birth to a son named Šimon on 22 October 2015. In October 2025, Konečná disclosed in an interview for Rytmus života that she had been diagnosed with multiple sclerosis twenty years earlier.
