= Miroslav Grebeníček =

Czech politician

Miroslav Grebeníček Member of Parliament
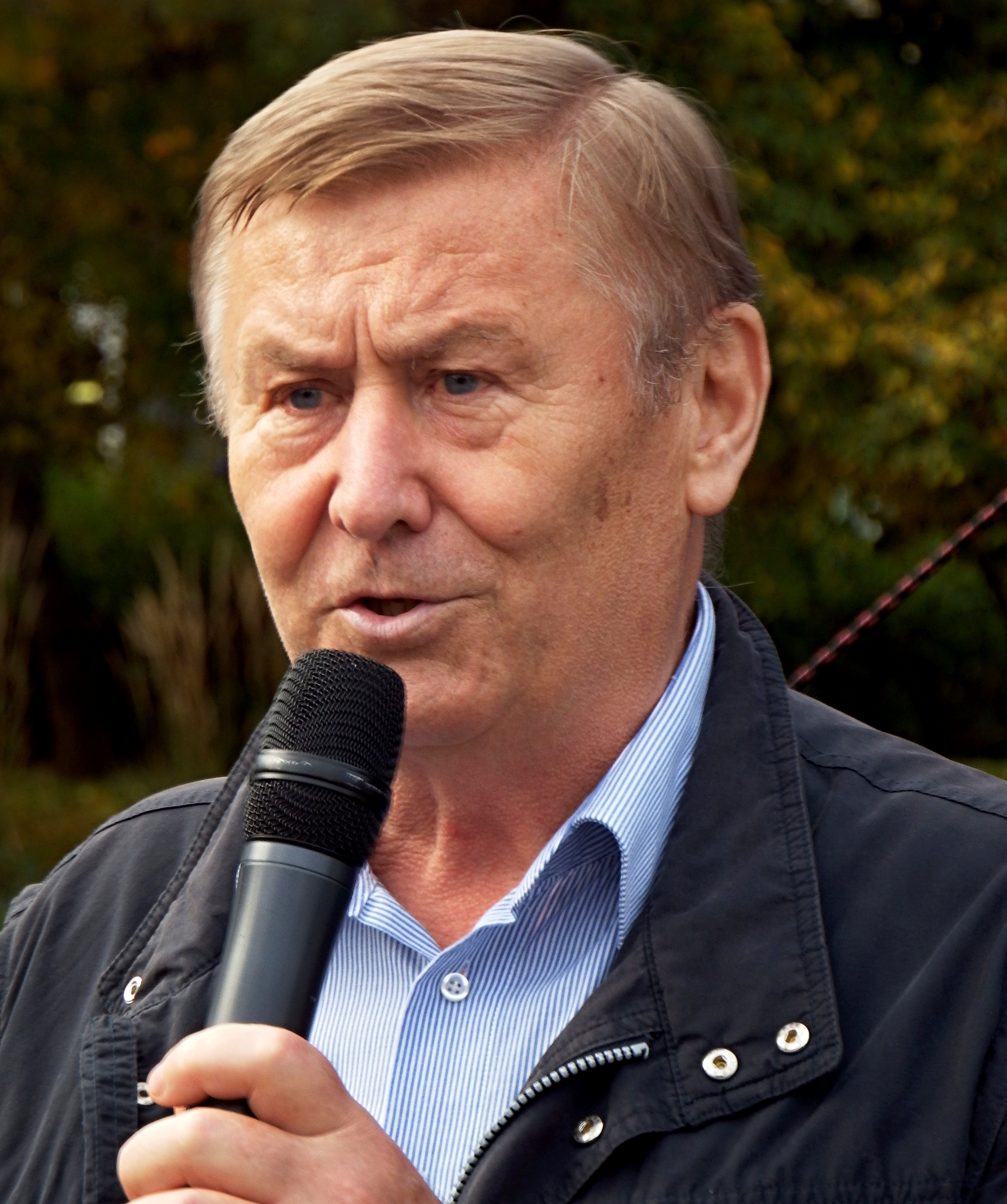

Leader of the Communist Party of Bohemia and Moravia
- In office 26 June 1993 – 1 October 2005
- Preceded by: Jiří Svoboda
- Succeeded by: Vojtěch Filip

Personal details
- Born: 21 March 1947 (age 79) Staré Město, Czechoslovakia
- Party: KSČ (1975–1990); KSČM (1990–present)
- Education: Masaryk University (UJEP)

Miroslav Grebeníček (born 21 March 1947 in Staré Město) is a Czech politician who was leader of the Communist Party of Bohemia and Moravia (KSČM) from 1993 to 2005. He was a member of the Chamber of Deputies from 1993 to 2021, with only six months absence in 2013.
