= Miloslav Ransdorf =

Czech politician

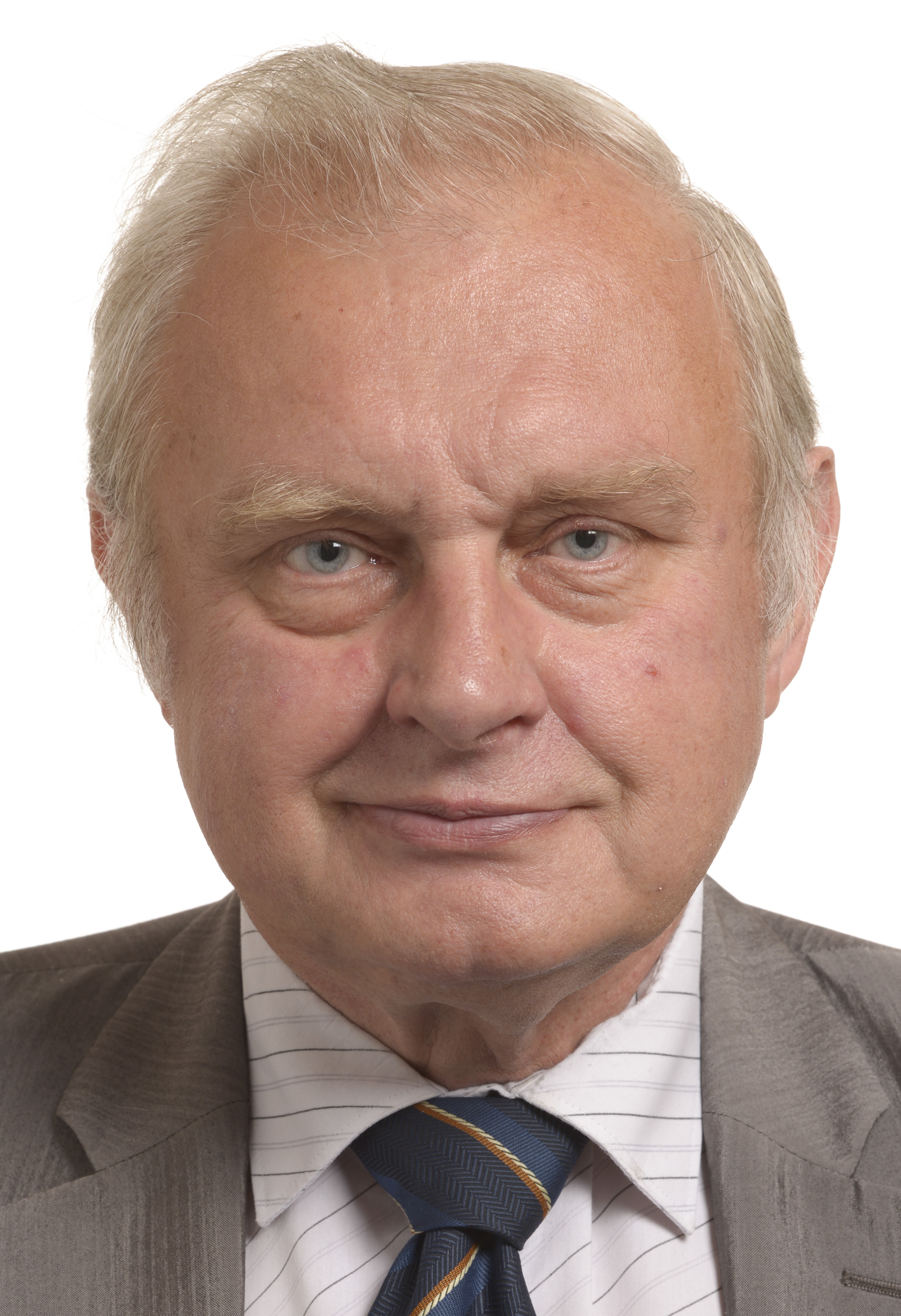

Member of the European Parliament for Czech Republic
- In office 1 May 2004 – 22 January 2016

Personal details
- Born: 15 February 1953 Rakovník, Czechoslovakia
- Died: 22 January 2016 (aged 62) Prague, Czech Republic
- Party: Communist Party of Bohemia and Moravia
- Occupation: politician

Miloslav Ransdorf (15 February 1953 – 22 January 2016) was a Czech politician and Member of the European Parliament for the Communist Party of Bohemia and Moravia, part of the European United Left–Nordic Green Left party group in the European Parliament.

== Life ==
He upheld atheist viewpoints. He died in office at Prague on 22 January 2016 of a stroke.

== Controversies ==
In 2013, Ransdorf was videotaped by Dutch newsblog Geenstijl, checking in at the European Parliament to claim 304 euro daily expenses fee and immediately leaving. When confronted, Ransdorf became engaged in a physical altercation with the reporter.

In 2015, Ransdorf was detained in Zürich, Switzerland, with three men from Slovakia, after attempting to withdraw 350 million euros at the Zurich Cantonal Bank with false IDs.

Ransdorf was involved in four car accidents, which led to speculation about drunk driving.
