= Josef Skála =

Czech politician

Vice-Chairman of Communist Party of Bohemia and Moravia
- In office 31 October 2009 – 26 June 2010
- In office 14 May 2016 – 21 April 2018

Personal details
- Born: 27 May 1952 (age 74) Czechoslovakia (now the Czech Republic)
- Party: Communist Party of Bohemia and Moravia (1990–present); Communist Party of Czechoslovakia (1970–1990)
- Education: Charles University

Josef Skála (born 27 May 1952) is a Czech communist politician, journalist, and university lecturer. He served as vice-chairman of the Communist Party of Bohemia and Moravia from 2009 to 2010 and from 2016 to 2018. Since 2018, he has been a signatory of the left-wing Restart platform. Since October 2021, he is one of the leaders of the Kudy z krize ("Where to go from the crisis") platform. He was also a prospective candidate for the Communist Party of Bohemia and Moravia in the 2023 Czech presidential election, but withdrew as he failed to gather enough signatures.

== Life ==
Josef Skála joined the Communist Party at the age of 18. He studied journalism at Charles University in Prague, graduating in 1975. In his memoirs from the 1970s, he wrote that "I welcomed the international aid of the USSR and other socialist countries in August 1968 with enthusiasm and relief. I welcomed the Soviet troops at dawn on August 21 at the Ruzyně Airport... I tried to help the Soviet soldiers even in seemingly insignificant matters of their daily life here. Soon after the entry of the troops, immediately after the parents managed to establish contact, I started working as a writer of articles, reports and notes for the Vltava radio station."

In 1978, he worked as an employee of the city committee of the Communist Party of Czechoslovakia in Prague (MV KSČ Prague). In 1980, he defended his candidate's dissertation "Social Consciousness and Contemporary Ideological Struggle" at the University of Political Affairs of the Communist Party of Czechoslovakia (Department of Marxism–Leninism). His supervisor was the Marxist philosopher Ladislav Hrzal. He then lectured on philosophy at Charles University and held senior positions in the Socialist Youth Union. In 1986, at a meeting of the Central Committee of the SSM, he was elected to the position of permanent representative of the Czechoslovak Headquarters of SSM undergraduates in the International Union of Students, replacing Miroslav Štěpán. He held the position until the dissolution of the SSM in 1990. Under Vasil Mohorita he was a member of the presidency of the Central Committee of the SSM, and the presidency of the World Peace Council, an international organization of left-wing youth.
