= Vojtěch Filip =

Czech politician

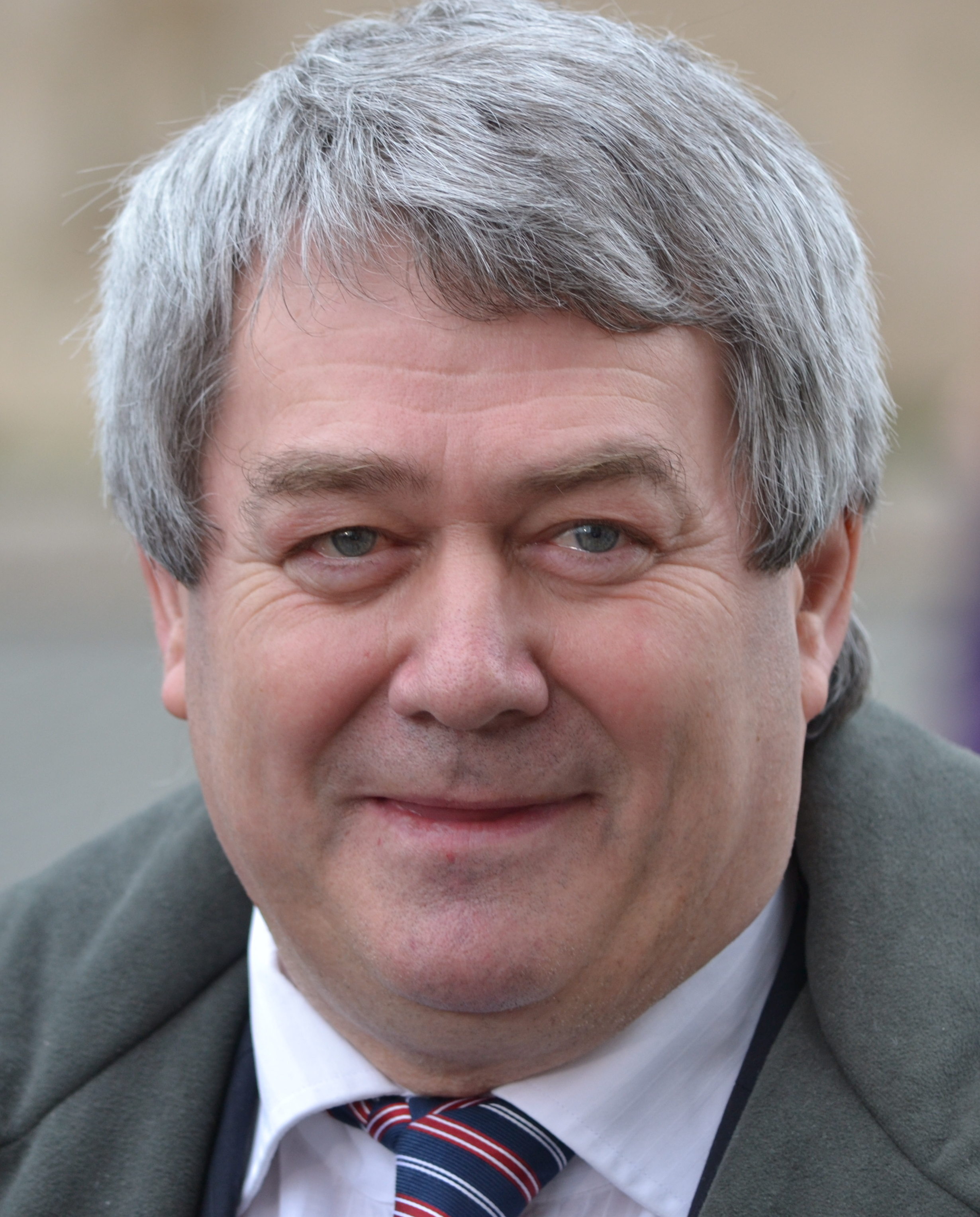
- Filip in 2013

1st Deputy President of the Chamber of Deputies
- In office 27 June 2018 – 21 October 2021
- Preceded by: Jan Hamáček
- Succeeded by: Věra Kovářová

Deputy President of the Chamber of Deputies
- In office 16 July 2002 – 15 June 2006
- In office 14 August 2006 – 3 June 2010
- In office 27 November 2013 – 26 October 2017
- In office 24 November 2017 – 27 June 2018

Member of the Chamber of Deputies
- In office 1 June 1996 – 21 October 2021

Leader of the Communist Party of Bohemia and Moravia
- In office 1 October 2005 – 9 October 2021
- Preceded by: Miroslav Grebeníček
- Succeeded by: Kateřina Konečná

Personal details
- Born: 13 January 1955 (age 71) Jedovary, Czechoslovakia
- Party: KSČ (1983–1990); KSČM (1990–present)
- Education: Masaryk University (UJEP)

Vojtěch Filip (Czech pronunciation: [ˈvojcɛx ˈfɪlɪp]; born 13 January 1955) is a Czech politician and former leader of the Communist Party of Bohemia and Moravia (KSČM).

== Early life and legal career ==
Filip was born in 1955, in Jedovary near České Budějovice. After graduating from the gymnasium in Trhové Sviny, he studied law at the University of Jan Evangelista Purkyně in Brno (now Masaryk University).

Before entering military service, Filip worked as a lawyer at the former national firm Sfinx Budweis. He returned to work there in September 1979 after completing his military service in Prague, and continued working there until 1990. In 1993 Filip started his own law firm.

== Political activities ==
Filip worked for the Socialist Union of Youth (Czech: Socialistický svaz mládeže; SSM) from 1970 to 1986. He joined the Communist Party of Czechoslovakia (KSČ) in 1983, and from 1990 was a member of the Communist Party of Bohemia and Moravia (KSČM), where he worked in the Central Auditing Commission and was later the chairman of the IP KSČM in České Budějovice and the UV KSCM. From 1996, he was a member of the party's Central Executive Committee. He also worked as Chairman of the Commission for Legislation and Human Rights of UV KSČM.

Filip was politically active at a local level from 1984, when he was elected in a by-election for Members of the Municipal National Committee in České Budějovice. His mandate as a Member of the Municipal National Committee ended in November 1990, and he later ran successfully for České Budějovice City Council on the KSČM list in 1994, and was re-elected in 1998 and in repeated elections in 1999.

From 1990, he was also politically active at the national level. He was a member of the House budget plan of the people, and between June 1992 and December 1992 the Secretary of the Constitutional and Legal Committee House of the people. In 1996 he was elected to the Chamber of Deputies for the KSČM. At the same time, he was elected President of the Club Members in the PS KSČM Senate. In his second term, he worked in the Committee for Defense and Security. After elections in 2002 and 2006 he was elected twice as vice-president of the Chamber of Deputies.

After the poor performance of the Communist Party of Bohemia and Moravia (KSČM) in the 2021 Czech legislative election, in which the party failed to meet the 5% voting threshold and was thus disqualified from parliament for the first time in its history, Filip resigned as leader of the party.

== Personal life ==
He married Ludmila in 1979, and they have two children, son Robin (born 1982) and daughter Darina (born 1985). His wife is a doctor, who acquired her own private practice in 1993. Filip's hobbies include music (particularly rock), nature, fishing and travelling.

== Controversies ==
In November 2014, Filip travelled to Moscow at the invitation of Sergei Zheleznyak. The Czech Parliament distanced themselves from Filip's trip and the statements he made while in Russia. Consequently, a vigorous debate took place about the financing of the trip, and Filip was criticized by the Parliament, who accused him of undermining Czech foreign policy interests and providing the Kremlin with useful propaganda.

== Bibliography ==
- Životopisy Filip Vojtěch JUDr.
