= Alexander Černý =

Czech politician

Member of the Chamber of Deputies of the Czech Republic
- In office 15 June 2002 – 21 October 2021

Personal details
- Born: 21 May 1953 (age 71); Olomouc, Czechoslovakia
- Political party: Communist Party of Bohemia and Moravia
- Occupation: Politician

Alexander Černý (born 21 May 1953) is a Czech politician. He was a member of the Chamber of Deputies of the Czech Republic from 2002 to 2021 and a councilor of the Olomouc Region from 2000 to 2020. He is a member of the Communist Party of Bohemia and Moravia (KSČM).

== Political career ==
Since 1990, he has been a professional employee of the KSČM. He has been actively involved in local politics for an extended period. In the municipal elections of 1994, 1998, 2002, and 2010, he was elected as a councilor of the city of Olomouc representing KSČM. As of 1998, he was mentioned professionally as the chairman of the local KSČM organization. He is also a member of the Central Committee of KSČM and the executive committee of the Central Committee of KSČM.

He also served at the regional level. In the regional elections of 2000, 2004, 2008, and 2012, he was elected to the Olomouc Regional Council representing KSČM. In the 2016 elections, he led the KSČM candidate list in the Olomouc Region and retained his position as a regional councilor. He ran again in the 2020 elections but was not successful.

In the 2002 elections, he was elected to the Chamber of Deputies representing KSČM (from the Olomouc Region electoral district). He served as a member of the parliamentary committee for defense and security and held the position of the 1st deputy chairman of the KSČM parliamentary group. He successfully defended his parliamentary mandate in the 2006 elections. He became the deputy chairman of the defense committee and continued as the 1st deputy chairman of the KSČM parliamentary group. He was re-elected to the Chamber of Deputies in the 2010 elections. He has been the deputy chairman of the committee for defense and security (since 2011, chairman of the separate defense committee) and the 1st deputy chairman of the Communist parliamentary group.

In the Chamber of Deputies elections in 2013, he ran as the leader of KSČM in the Olomouc Region and was elected as a member of parliament. Within the KSČM shadow cabinet, he oversees the defense portfolio.

Similarly, in the 2017 elections to the Chamber of Deputies, he led KSČM in the Olomouc Region. He received 1,822 preferential votes and successfully defended his parliamentary mandate.

However, in the 2021 elections to the Chamber of Deputies, he did not run as a candidate.
