= Miroslav Tetter =

Czech politician and academic (1938–2021)

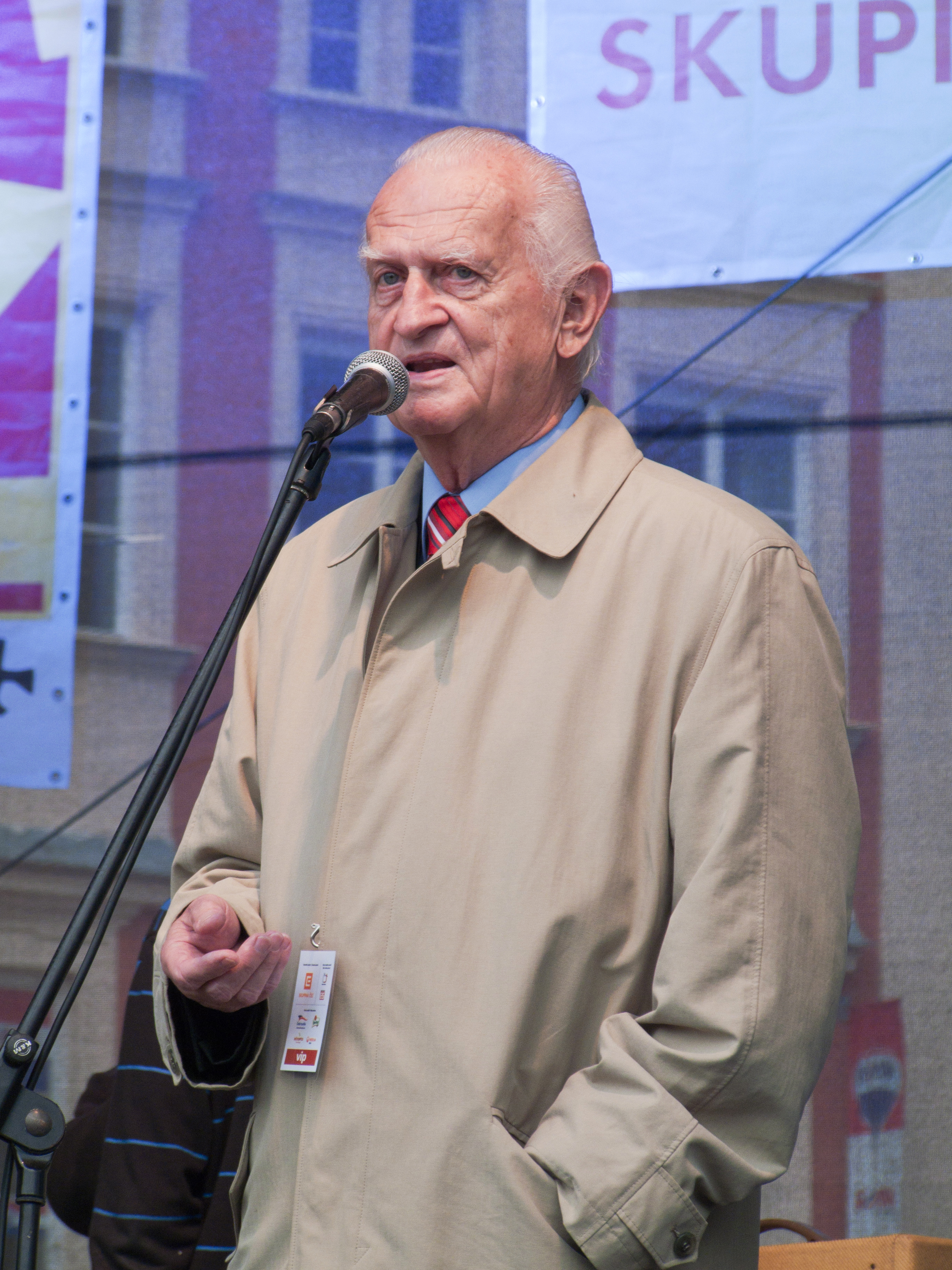
- Tetter in 2010

Member of the South Bohemian Regional Council
- In office 12 November 2000 – 6 November 2008

Mayor of České Budějovice
- In office 24 June 2010 – 23 November 2010
- Preceded by: Juraj Thoma
- Succeeded by: Juraj Thoma
- In office 1998 – 2 November 2006
- Preceded by: Miroslav Beneš
- Succeeded by: Juraj Thoma

Personal details
- Born: 3 April 1938 Vsetín, Czechoslovakia
- Died: 11 August 2021 (aged 83)
- Party: KAN; KDU-ČSL

Miroslav Tetter (3 April 1938 – 11 August 2021) was a Czech politician and academic. He was a representative of the South Bohemian Region from 2000 to 2008 and Mayor of České Budějovice from 1998 to 2006 and again in 2010. In his earlier political career he served in the České Budějovice City Council.

== Biography ==
Tetter was born in Vsetín. From 1957 to 1962, he studied at the Faculty of Science of Masaryk University. Tetter also graduated from the Czech University of Life Sciences Prague. He taught at the agricultural school in České Budějovice. Tetter then became Vice-Rector of Science and head of the ecology department at the Faculty of Agriculture of University of South Bohemia in České Budějovice.

In 1990, Tetter was elected to the České Budějovice City Council as a member of the Club of Committed Non-Party Members (KAN). In 1994, he was re-elected as part of the coalition between KDU-ČSL, KAN, and the Christian Democratic Party (KDS). He was re-elected in 1998, 2002, and 2006, before being defeated in 2010. Tetter served as Mayor of the city from 1998 to 2006. In 1996 and 2006, he unsuccessfully ran for the Senate in the district of České Budějovice. He was elected Mayor of České Budějovice again in 2010, serving from 24 June to 23 November.

In the 2000 regional election, Tetter was elected to the South Bohemian Regional Council as part of the Four-Coalition. He was re-elected in 2004, returning the highest number of votes from any candidate on the list.

Tetter died in České Budějovice on 11 August 2021 at the age of 83.
