= Jiří Havlíček =

Czech politician

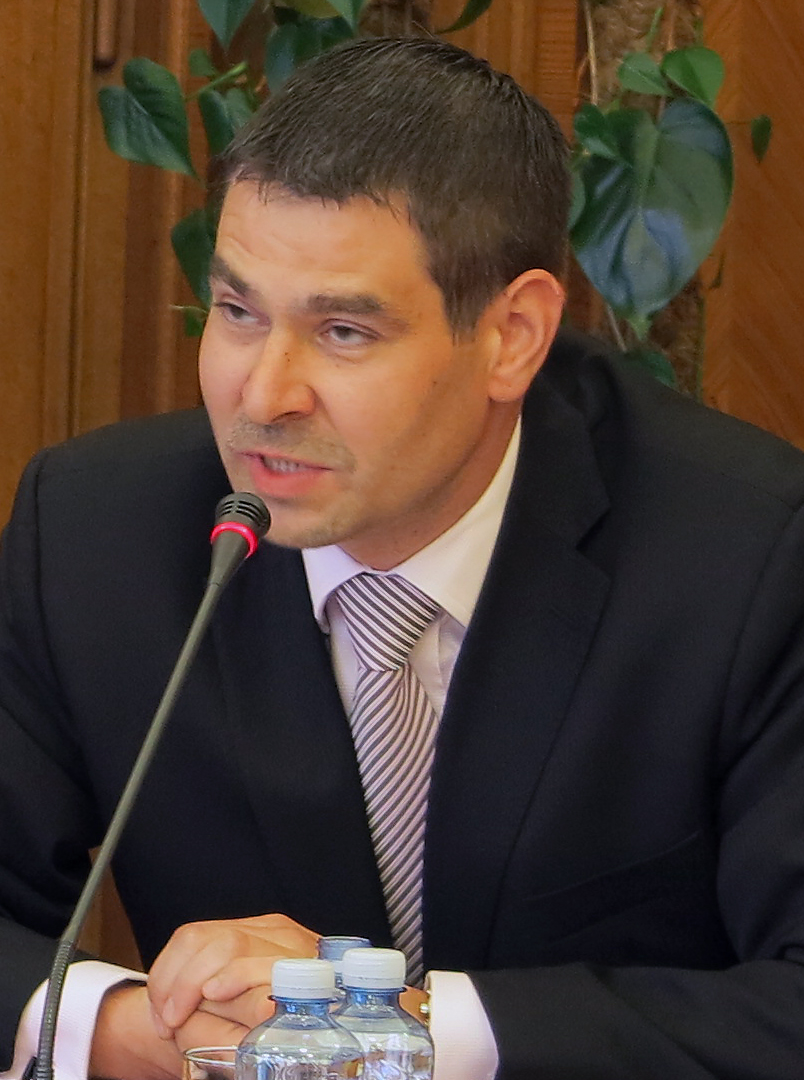
- Jiří Havlíček in 2014

Minister of Industry and Trade
- In office 4 April 2017 – 13 December 2017
- Prime Minister: Bohuslav Sobotka
- Preceded by: Bohuslav Sobotka (Acting)
- Succeeded by: Tomáš Hüner

Personal details
- Born: 16 May 1976 (age 50) Ledeč nad Sázavou, Czechoslovakia
- Party: Social Democratic Party (since 1998)
- Children: One daughter
- Education: Prague University of Economics and Business

Jiří Havlíček (born 16 May 1976) is a Czech economist who served as Minister of Industry and Trade of the Czech Republic from April until December 2017 in Cabinet of Bohuslav Sobotka.

== Early life ==
Havlíček was born on 16 May 1976. In 2012, Havlíček received MBA honour at LIGS University, which is not accredited by any agency recognized by the United States Department of Education or any of the Czech accreditation commissions in the field of marketing and communication.

== Political career ==
Between 2006 and 2010, Havlíček was the chief manager/central secretary of Chamber of Deputies of the Czech Republic.

In the 1998 and 2002 Czech municipal elections, Havlíček became a candidate for the ČSSD in the City Council of Čáslav, but was not elected. He became a city representative only after the 2006 Czech municipal elections.

Havlíček defended his mandate in the 2010 Czech municipal elections, but resigned as deputy mayor and became a Minister of Foreign Affairs of the Czech Republic. He was also a city representative in the 2014 and 2018 Czech municipal elections.

On 11 February 2014, Havlíček was appointed Deputy Minister of Industry and Trade of the Czech Republic and head of the Office of the Ministry, managing the administrative section.

In 2017, following Jan Mládek's dismissal as Minister of Industry and Trade of the Czech Republic, prime minister Bohuslav Sobotka requested Havlíček to president Miloš Zeman for the vacant post. Zeman met Havlíček on 27 March and subsequently gave this position on 4 April. Havlíček remained in the position of Minister of Industry and Trade of the Czech Republic until 13 December 2017, after which he was replaced by Tomáš Hüner Havlíček left the deputy position at the end of May 2019.

== Personal life ==
Havlíček is divorced. He has a daughter named Aneta.
