= Opinion polling for the 2006 Czech parliamentary election =

Opinion polling for the 2006 Czech parliamentary election started immediately after the 2002 parliamentary election.

== Opinion polls ==
Date	Polling Firm	ODS	ČSSD	KSČM	KDU-ČSL	SZ	US-DEU	NEZDEM	SNK-ED	NEZ	Others
2-3 Jun 2006	Election	35.3	32.3	12.8	7.2	6.3	0.3	0.7	2.1	0.6	2.4
25–26 May 2006	SC&C	30.8	24.2	12.1	5.8	8.6	—	—	—	—	
22 May 2006	Median	19.0	20.0	12.2	6.0	8.9	—	—	—	—	
18–24 May 2006	Factum Invenio	27.8	28.5	17.3	9.0	8.6	1.1	—	1.5	—	3.0
19. May 2006	CVVM	32.0	28.0	15.5	5.5	10.5	0.5	1.0	2.5	2.0	2.5
12 May 2006	Factum Invenio	29.0	22.8	16.7	11.3	9.8	—	—	—	—	—
9. May 2006	STEM	26.7	25.2	13.0	5.4	7.1	0.3	0.2	0.9	0.4	—
19 April 2006	STEM	26.8	21.3	13.3	4.9	10.6	0.5	—	1.1	0.5	—
18 April 2006	Factum Invenio	29.5	23.6	18.1	12.3	10.0	—	—	—	—	—
13 April 2006	SC&C	24.0	15.0	11.0	4.0	10.0	—	—	—	—	35.0
3 April 2006	Factum Invenio	29.3	25.3	17.6	9.9	10.5	2.2	0.6	0.8	1.7	2.1
24 March 2006	CVVM	25.5	21.0	12.5	6.5	10.0	—	—	—	—	24.5
17 March 2006	STEM	26.7	21.8	12.4	6.1	9.4	0.3	0.1	1.0	0.8	21.6
16 February 2006	STEM	28.6	24.5	15.3	6.4	5.6	0.3	0.2	0.5	1.0	15.6
2 February 2006	CVVM	36.0	35.0	14.5	8.0	3.0	1.0	—	—	1.0	1.5
18 January 2006	STEM	28.6	27.2	13.2	6.7	3.4	0.5	0.3	1.0	0.8	18.3
19 December 2005	STEM	31.0	25.9	14.2	5.6	3.1	1.0	0.3	1.0	0.9	16.3
1 December 2005	CVVM	33.5	31.5	16.5	10.5	4.5	0.5	—	—	2.0	1.5
21 November 2005	STEM	30.5	25.6	13.6	6.3	2.5	0.7	0.2	1.0	0.3	18.8
1 November 2005	CVVM	37.0	28.5	18.5	9.5	3.0	1.0	—	—	1.5	1.0
19 Oct 2005	STEM	32.3	24.5	15.5	8.4	3.1	1.2	0.3	1.2	1.2	12.3
22 Sep 2005	CVVM	37.5	29.7	16.0	8.0	4.0	1.0	—	1.5	1.0	1.0
19 Sep 2005	STEM	32.8	21.1	13.5	7.3	2.9	0.5	—	1.2	1.6	19.1
28 Jul 2005	CVVM	37.5	24.0	18.0	10.5	3.5	1.0	—	2.0	2.0	1.5
21 Jul 2005	STEM	31.7	20.9	16.6	6.8	3.2	1.0	—	1.6	1.4	16.8
15 Jun 2005	STEM	31.8	15.0	18.0	6.4	3.2	1.0	—	1.6	2.3	20.7
8 Jun 2005	CVVM	40.0	21.0	19.0	9.5	3.5	2.0	—	1.0	2.0	2.0
17 May 2005	STEM	29.4	11.4	16.4	6.2	2.8	1.1	—	1.3	1.3	30.1
18 Apr 2005	STEM	33.6	11.9	17.6	8.3	3.4	2.2	—	1.6	1.7	19.7
16 Mar 2005	STEM	35.5	13.3	17.9	9.4	2.7	2.1	—	1.5	2.0	15.6
4 Mar 2005	CVVM	41.0	19.5	20.0	11.0	3.0	1.5	—	—	2.0	2.0
16 Feb 2005	STEM	35.0	14.0	15.9	8.4	3.4	0.7	—	1.7	2.5	18.4
11 Feb 2005	CVVM	41.0	18.5	19.0	13.0	2.5	1.0	—	1.5	2.5	1.0
21 Jan 2005	STEM	35.9	13.9	17.0	9.0	2.1	1.2	—	1.1	2.3	17.5
17 Dec 2004	STEM	34.1	15.6	16.1	8.1	3.4	1.2	—	2.7	1.7	17.1
15 Dec 2004	CVVM	43.0	15.0	19.5	11.5	3.5	2.0	0.5	1.0	3.0	1.0
30 Nov 2004	STEM	33.8	13.5	16.9	9.0	3.3	0.9	—	2.8	1.4	18.4
25 Nov 2004	CVVM	43.0	16.0	19.0	11.0	3.5	1.0	0.5	2.0	3.0	1.0
12-13 Nov 2004	Senate election (2nd round)	53.8	5.2	13.6	11.4	2.8	5.0	—	1.5	3.4	3.3
5-6 Nov 2004	Senate election (1st round)	33.3	12.5	17.4	13.5	1.0	3.6	—	2.8	5.0	10.9
5-6 Nov 2004	Regional election	36.4	14.0	19.7	10.7	0.6	1.2	—	0.6	2.5	
31 Oct 2004	CVVM	37.5	25.0	19.0	10.5	2.5	0.5	—	0.5	2.5	1.5
27 Oct 2004	STEM	28.2	18.3	16.6	7.4	3.4	1.2	—	2.6	1.1	21.2
29 Sep 2004	CVVM	41.5	19.5	18.5	10.0	3.5	1.0	—	0.5	4.0	1.5
23 Sep 2004	STEM	31.6	16.3	15.5	7.6	2.5	1.1	—	2.1	1.2	22.1
30 Jul 2004	STEM	33.5	13.6	19.1	8.1	3.5	1.0	—	1.7	3.1	16.4
12 Jul 2004	CVVM	40.5	15.0	20.5	10.0	3.0	1.0	—	3.0	3.0	4.0
18 Jun 2004	STEM	32.1	14.1	16.7	8.3	4.7	1.7	—	2.3	2.9	17.2
11-12 Jun 2004	EP Election	30.0	8.8	20.3	9.6	3.2	1.7	8.5	11.0		
7 Jun 2004	STEM	34.6	16.5	17.6	7.9	2.1	1.7	—	3.5	—	15.8
6 Jun 2004	CVVM	39.5	17.0	18.5	12.0	3.0	2.0	—	2.5	2.0	3.5
30 Apr 2004	CVVM	43.0	17.0	20.5	8.5	2.5	2.5	—	2.5	3.5	2.5
1 Apr 2004	STEM	35.4	17.1	19.6	8.9	1.8	2.6	—	1.6	—	13.0
31 Mar 2004	CVVM	44.0	18.0	19.5	11.0	2.0	2.5	—	—	2.0	1.0
31 Mar 2004	STEM	33.7	16.0	16.6	9.1	2.0	2.8	—	2.5	—	17.3
25 Deb 2004	CVVM	43.0	19.0	22.5	9.5	1.0	3.0	—	—	1.0	1.0
28 Jan 2004	CVVM	40.0	21.5	19.0	11.0	2.0	2.5	—	—	2.0	2.0
23 Jan 2004	STEM	33.9	16.5	19.8	8.4	1.8	2.6	—	1.5	—	15.5
22 Dec 2003	STEM	35.0	15.5	17.8	8.9	1.3	3.1	—	1.6	—	16.8
17 Dec 2003	CVVM	41.0	18.5	21.0	9.0	3.0	3.0	—	—	3.0	1.5
26 Nov 2003	STEM	31.9	19.6	18.1	9.0	1.4	4.0	—	2.2	—	14.8
26 Nov 2003	CVVM	41.0	20.5	20.0	10.5	2.0	3.0	—	—	2.0	1.0
29 Oct 2003	STEM	32.6	16.6	18.5	6.7	1.3	3.5	—	1.7	—	19.1
22 Oct 2003	CVVM	29.0	14.5	13.5	10.0	1.5	3.5	—	—	1.5	27.5
24 Sep 2003	CVVM	37.5	22.0	19.0	10.0	2.0	4.0	—	—	1.5	4.0
22 Sep 2003	STEM	32.0	17.2	16.0	7.9	1.4	2.6	—	1.5	—	21.4
16 Jul 2003	CVVM	38.5	21.0	15.5	11.5	2.0	4.0	—	—	1.5	6.0
2 Jul 2003	STEM	33.7	17.6	15.6	7.7	1.7	3.4	—	2.1	—	18.2
6 Jun 2003	CVVM	41.5	19.5	19.0	9.5	1.5	4.0	—	—	2.0	3.0
23 May 2003	STEM	29.4	18.4	14.2	7.5	1.1	2.4	—	1.2	—	25.8
25 Apr 2003	CVVM	38.0	27.0	17.0	7.5	3.0	3.0	—	—	1.5	3.0
18 Apr 2003	STEM	32.0	20.6	15.4	9.0	2.7					
19 Mar 2003	CVVM	38.0	25.0	18.0	10.0	1.0	4.0	—	—	1.0	3.0
19 Feb 2003	CVVM	31.0	27.5	17.5	10.0	2.5	2.0	—	—	2.5	7.0
22 Jan 2003	CVVM	30.0	31.0	17.0	10.0	0.5	3.5	—	0.5	3.5	4.0
16 Dec 2002	STEM	25.6	27.2	14.6	7.9	1.8	3.7	—	2.3	—	16.9
11 Dec 2002	CVVM	28.0	30.0	18.0	8.0	2.5	3.5	—	—	3.5	5.5
4 Nov 2002	CVVM	26.5	36.0	15.5	10.0	1.5	6.0	—	—	1.0	3.5
10 Oct 2002	CVVM	21.5	41.0	17.0	10.0	2.0	4.0	—	—	1.5	3.0
14-15 Jun 2002	Previous Election	24.5	30.2	18.5	14.3	2.4	w.KDU-ČSL	—	—	—	10.1

=== Coalitions ===
Date	Polling Firm	Centre-right Coalition ODS+ KDU-ČSL+SZ	Left Wing Coalition ČSSD+KSČM
2-3 Jun 2006	Election	48.8	45.1
25–26 May 2006	SC&C	45.2	36.3
22 May 2006	Median	33.9	32.2
18–24 May 2006	Factum Invenio	45.4	45.8
19. May 2006	CVVM	48.0	43.5
12 May 2016	Factum Invenio	50.1	39.5
9. May 2006	STEM	39.2	38.2
19 April 2006	STEM	42.3	34.6
18 April 2006	Factum Invenio	51.8	41.7
13 April 2006	SC&C	38.0	26.0
3 April 2006	Factum Invenio	49.7	42.9
24 March 2006	CVVM	42.0	33.5
17 March 2006	STEM	42.2	34.2
16 February 2006	STEM	40.6	39.8
2 February 2006	CVVM	47.0	49.5
18 January 2006	STEM	38.7	40.4
19 December 2005	STEM	39.9	40.1
1 December 2005	CVVM	48.5	48.0
21 November 2005	STEM	38.8	39.2
1 November 2005	CVVM	49.5	47.0
19 Oct 2005	STEM	43.8	45.0
22 Sep 2005	CVVM	49.5	45.7
19 Sep 2005	STEM	43.0	34.6
28 Jul 2005	CVVM	51.5	42.0
21 Jul 2005	STEM	41.7	37.5
15 Jun 2005	STEM	41.4	33.0
8 Jun 2005	CVVM	53.0	40.0
17 May 2005	STEM	38.4	27.8
18 Apr 2005	STEM	45.3	29.5
16 Mar 2005	STEM	47.6	31.2
4 Mar 2005	CVVM	52.0	39.5
16 Feb 2005	STEM	46.8	29.9
11 Feb 2005	CVVM	56.5	37.5
21 Jan 2005	STEM	47.0	30.9
17 Dec 2004	STEM	45.6	31.7
15 Dec 2004	CVVM	58.0	34.5
30 Nov 2004	STEM	46.1	30.4
25 Nov 2004	CVVM	57.5	35.0
12-13 Nov 2004	Senate election (2nd round)	68.0	18.8
5-6 Nov 2004	Senate election (1st round)	47.8	29.9
5-6 Nov 2004	Regional election	47.8	33.7
31 Oct 2004	CVVM	50.5	44.0
27 Oct 2004	STEM	39.0	34.9
29 Sep 2004	CVVM	55.0	38.0
23 Sep 2004	STEM	41.7	31.8
30 Jul 2004	STEM	45.1	32.7
12 Jul 2004	CVVM	53.5	35.5
18 Jun 2004	STEM	45.1	30.8
11-12 Jun 2004	EP Election	42.8	29.1
7 Jun 2004	STEM	44.6	34.1
6 Jun 2004	CVVM	54.5	35.5
30 Apr 2004	CVVM	54.0	37.5
1 Apr 2004	STEM	46.1	36.7
31 Mar 2004	CVVM	57.0	37.5
31 Mar 2004	STEM	44.8	32.6
25 Deb 2004	CVVM	53.5	41.5
28 Jan 2004	CVVM	53.0	40.5
23 Jan 2004	STEM	44.1	36.3
22 Dec 2003	STEM	45.2	33.3
17 Dec 2003	CVVM	53.0	39.5
26 Nov 2003	STEM	42.3	37.7
26 Nov 2003	CVVM	53.5	40.5
29 Oct 2003	STEM	41.0	35.1
22 Oct 2003	CVVM	40.5	28.0
24 Sep 2003	CVVM	49.5	41.0
22 Sep 2003	STEM	41.3	33.2
16 Jul 2003	CVVM	52.0	36.5
2 Jul 2003	STEM	43.1	33.2
6 Jun 2003	CVVM	52.5	38.5
23 May 2003	STEM	47.0	32.6
25 Apr 2003	CVVM	48.5	44.0
18 Apr 2003	STEM	43.7	36.0
19 Mar 2003	CVVM	49.0	43.0
19 Feb 2003	CVVM	43.5	45
22 Jan 2003	CVVM	40.5	48.0
16 Dec 2002	STEM	35.3	41.8
11 Dec 2002	CVVM	38.0	48.0
4 Nov 2002	CVVM	38.0	51.5
10 Oct 2002	CVVM	33.5	58.0
14-15 Jun 2002	Previous Election	41.2	48.7

== Seats ==
Date	Polling Firm	ODS	ČSSD	KSČM	KDU-ČSL	SZ	US-DEU
2-3 Jun 2006	Election	81	74	26	13	6	0
28 May 2006	Factum Invenio	61	63	38	19	19	0
16 May 2006	STEM	74	66	35	8	17	0
12 May 2006	Factum Invenio	65	51	37	25	22	0
28 Apr 2006	Factum Invenio	65	56	38	25	16	0
18 Apr 2006	STEM	76	64	25	13	22	0
18 Apr 2006	Factum Invenio	63	50	39	26	22	0
4 Apr 2006	Factum Invenio	64	55	38	21	22	0
20 Mar 2006	Factum Invenio	65	58	39	19	19	0
6 Mar 2006	Factum Invenio	68	53	42	20	17	0
26 Jan 2006	Factum Invenio	70	60	45	25	0	0
7 Dec 2005	Factum Invenio	69	64	42	25	0	0
3 Nov 2005	Factum Invenio	64	62	47	27	0	0
20 Sep 2005	Factum Invenio	76	51	52	21	0	0
30 Jun 2005	Factum Invenio	77	52	44	27	0	0
31 May 2005	Factum Invenio	71	39	60	30	0	0
28 Apr 2005	Factum Invenio	82	33	60	25	0	0
10 Mar 2005	Factum Invenio	77	43	57	23	0	0
14-15 Jun 2002	Previous Election	58	70	41	23	0	8

=== Coalitions ===
Date	Polling Firm	Centre-right Coalition ODS+ KDU-ČSL+SZ	Left Wing Coalition ČSSD+KSČM
2-3 Jun 2006	Election	100	100
28 May 2006	Factum Invenio	99	101
16 May 2006	STEM	99	101
12 May 2006	Factum Invenio	112	88
28 Apr 2006	Factum Invenio	106	94
18 Apr 2006	STEM	111	89
18 Apr 2006	Factum Invenio	111	89
4 Apr 2006	Factum Invenio	107	93
20 Mar 2006	Factum Invenio	103	97
6 Mar 2006	Factum Invenio	105	95
26 Jan 2006	Factum Invenio	95	105
7 Dec 2005	Factum Invenio	94	106
3 Nov 2005	Factum Invenio	81	109
20 Sep 2005	Factum Invenio	97	103
30 Jun 2005	Factum Invenio	104	96
31 May 2005	Factum Invenio	101	99
28 Apr 2005	Factum Invenio	107	93
10 Mar 2005	Factum Invenio	100	100
14-15 Jun 2002	Previous Election	89	111

== Leadership polls ==
Date	Polling Firm	Jiří Paroubek ČSSD	Mirek Topolánek ODS	Vojtěch Filip KSČM	Miroslav Kalousek KDU-ČSL
3–9 June 2006	Factum Invenio	25.0	33.0	—	—
24 Oct 2005	Median	41.0	28.5	6.0	4.2
