= Young Communists (Czech Republic) =

Young Communists Mladí komunisté
- Chairman: Petra Prokšanová
- Headquarters: Prague
- Ideology: Communism; Socialism
- Mother party: Communist Party of Bohemia and Moravia
- Website: http://mladi.kscm.cz

Young Communists (Czech: Mladí komunisté) is a communist youth organization in the Czech Republic, and is a branch of the Communist Party of Bohemia and Moravia. Youth organization is directed by the Youth Commission of the Central Committee of the Communist Party of Bohemia and Moravia. Organization cooperates with the Communist Youth Union, more far-left organization.
