= 2026 Communist Party of Bohemia and Moravia leadership election =

- 30 May 2026
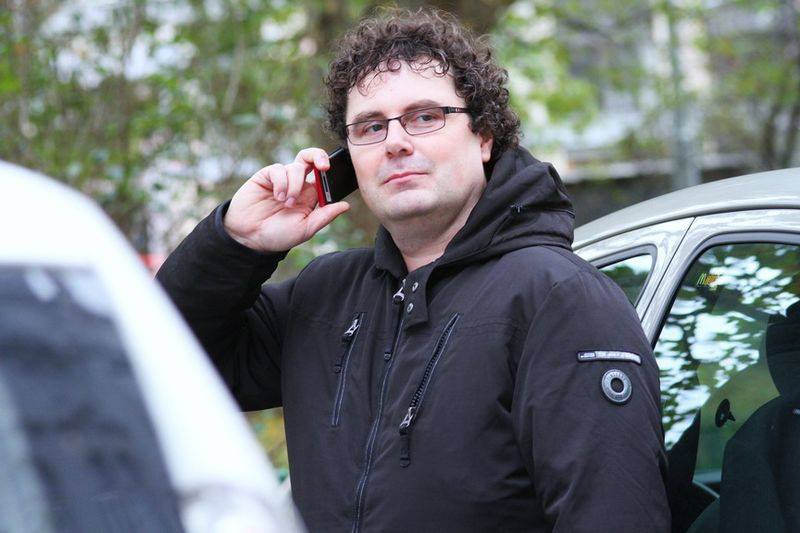

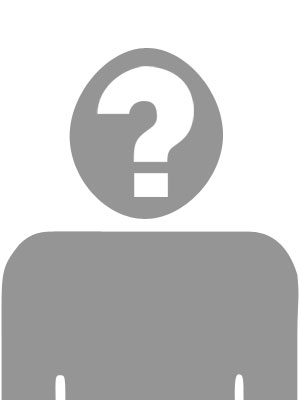
Candidate	Roman Roun	Milan Krajča
Electoral vote	94	82
Percentage	53.41	46.59
Leader of KSČM before election
Kateřina Konečná
Elected Leader of KSČM
Roman Roun

The Communist Party of Bohemia and Moravia (KSČM) held a leadership election on 30 May 2026. The party's spokesperson Roman Roun was elected as the new leader of KSČM.

== Background ==
Incumbent leader Kateřina Konečná resigned after the Stačilo! alliance failed to meet the 5% threshold in the 2025 parliamentary election. In January 2026, she announced her decision to not run for re-election.

== Candidates ==
- Roman Roun, party's spokesperson.
- Milan Krajča, deputy leader of party.
- Leo Luzar, former MP.
- Petra Prokšanová, chair of the party's Prague organization.
- Petr Bureš, operator of the TV Bureš channel on YouTube.

== Voting ==
According to Roun, he received 94 and Krajča 82 votes.

Candidate	Votes	%
Roman Roun	94	53.41%
Milan Krajča	82	46.59%
