= Haló noviny =

Czech newspaper

- Type: Daily newspaper
- Owner(s): Futura, a.s.
- Editor: Petr Kojzar
- Founded: 1991; 35 years ago
- Ceased publication: 2022; 4 years ago
- Political alignment: Communism
- Headquarters: Prague
- Price: 12 Kč
- Website: halonoviny.cz

Haló noviny (meaning Hello Newspaper in English) was a daily newspaper published in the Czech Republic. It had close ties to the Communist Party of Bohemia and Moravia as the newspapers publisher, Futura a.s., is owned in majority by the party. The newspaper ceased production in April 2022 after the Communist Party of Bohemia and Moravia suffered financial issues related to the 2020 Czech Senate election.

Haló noviny was replaced by the weekly newspaper Naše Pravda (meaning Our Truth in English) in April 2022.

== History and profile ==
Haló noviny was founded in 1991. It was one of the few newspapers in the Czech Republic not to be foreign-owned during its existence. It was considered to hold a radical left-wing stance and outlets such as Czech television and Czech radio refused to use it as a source.

The newspaper's title was based on historical newspapers with similar titles, such as the ones published as regional newspapers in Prague from 1929, associated with the journalist Julius Fučík. The tabloid style was derived from a 1970s Brno edition of a similar name.

The central KSČM commission decided to cease publishing the newspaper after suffering financial issues, brought on by the party failing to reach the 5% electoral threshold for the senate in the 2020 Czech Senate election. On April 28, 2022, the last issue of the newspaper was published. It was replaced by the weekly newspaper Naše Pravda.

== See also ==
- List of newspapers in the Czech Republic
