= 2004 Czech regional elections =

Elections in Czechia

← 2000	5–7 November 2004	2008 →

675 seats
- Turnout: 29.6%
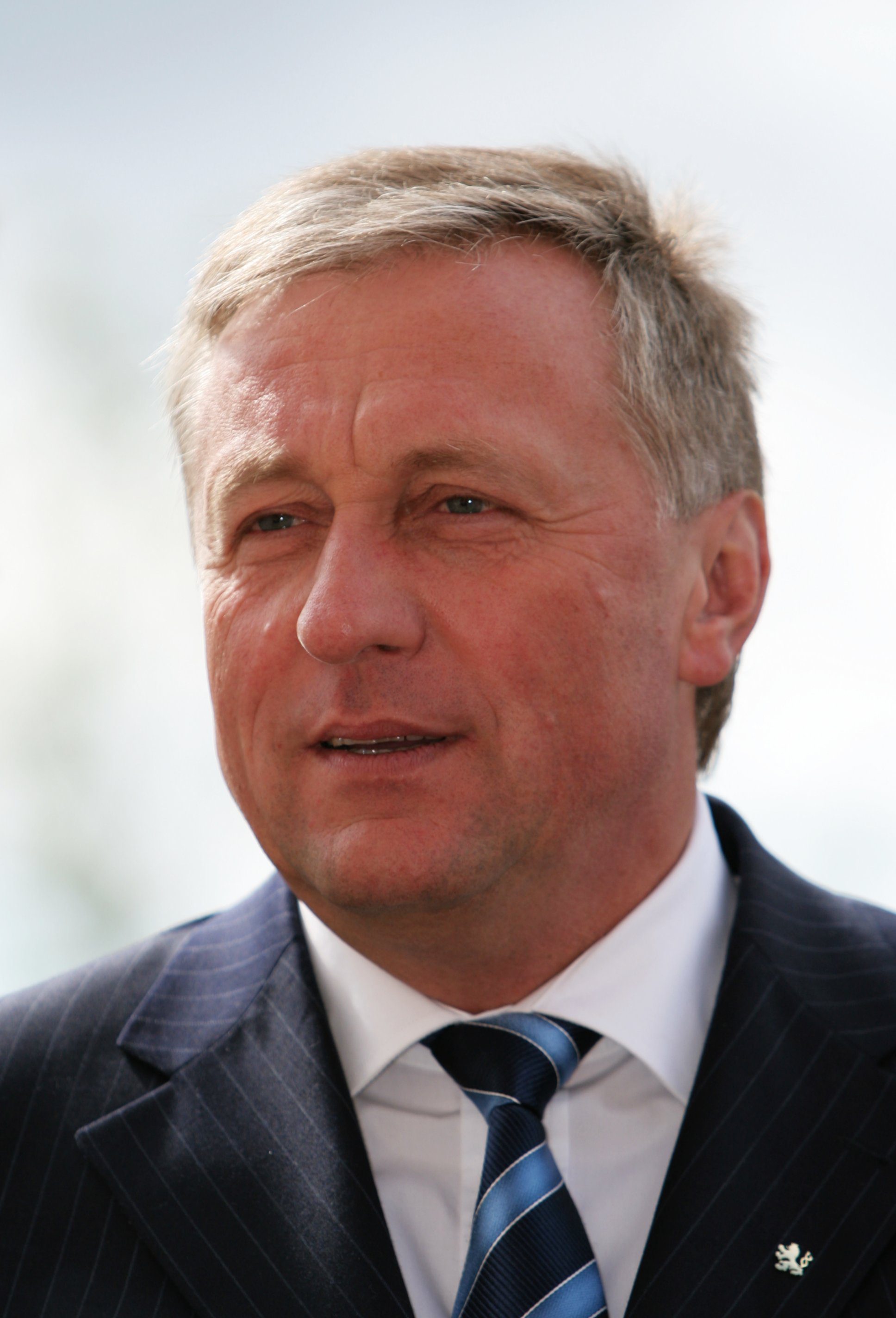

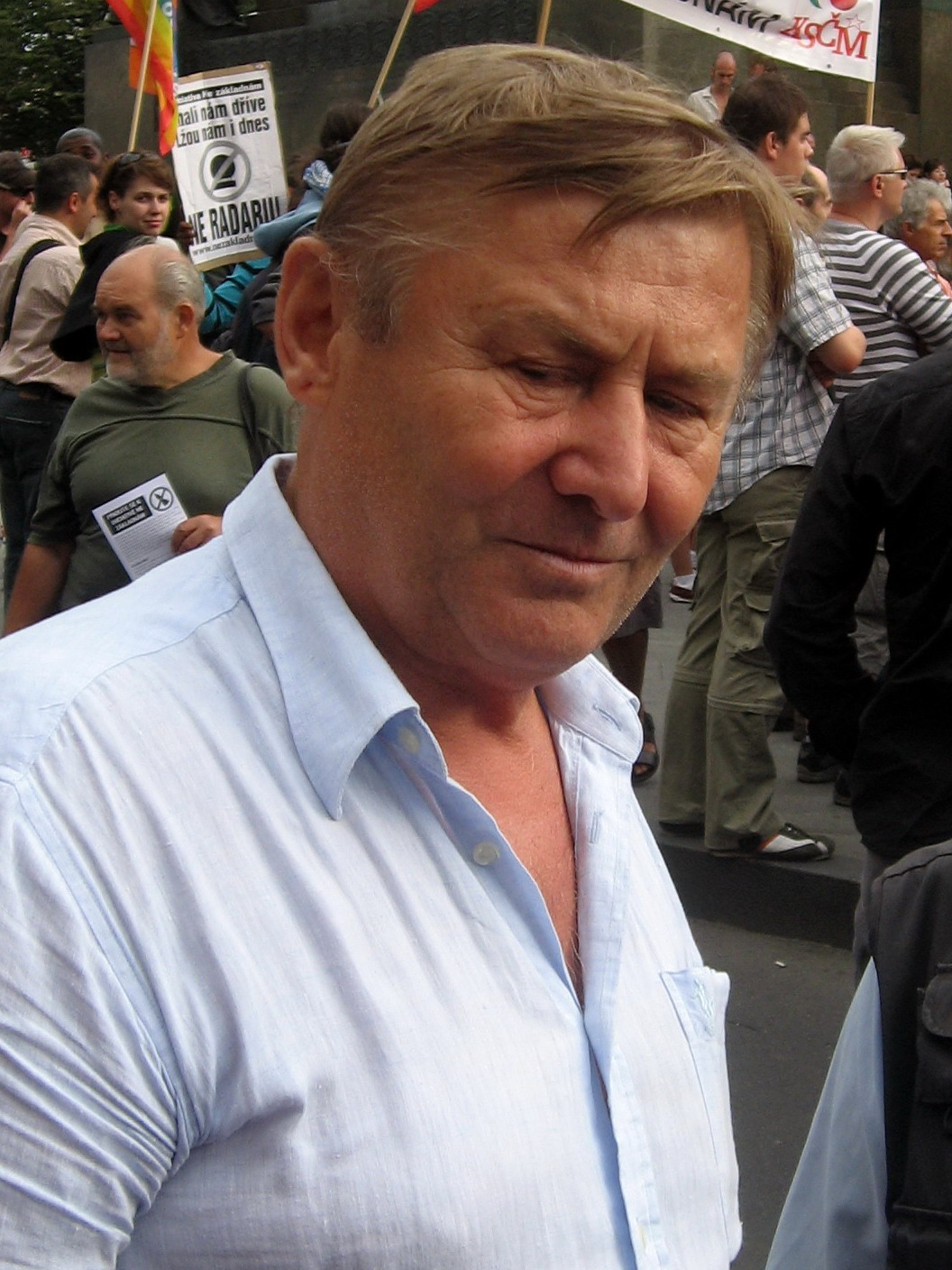

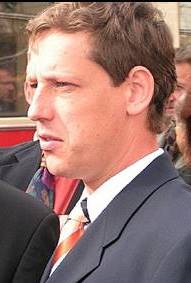

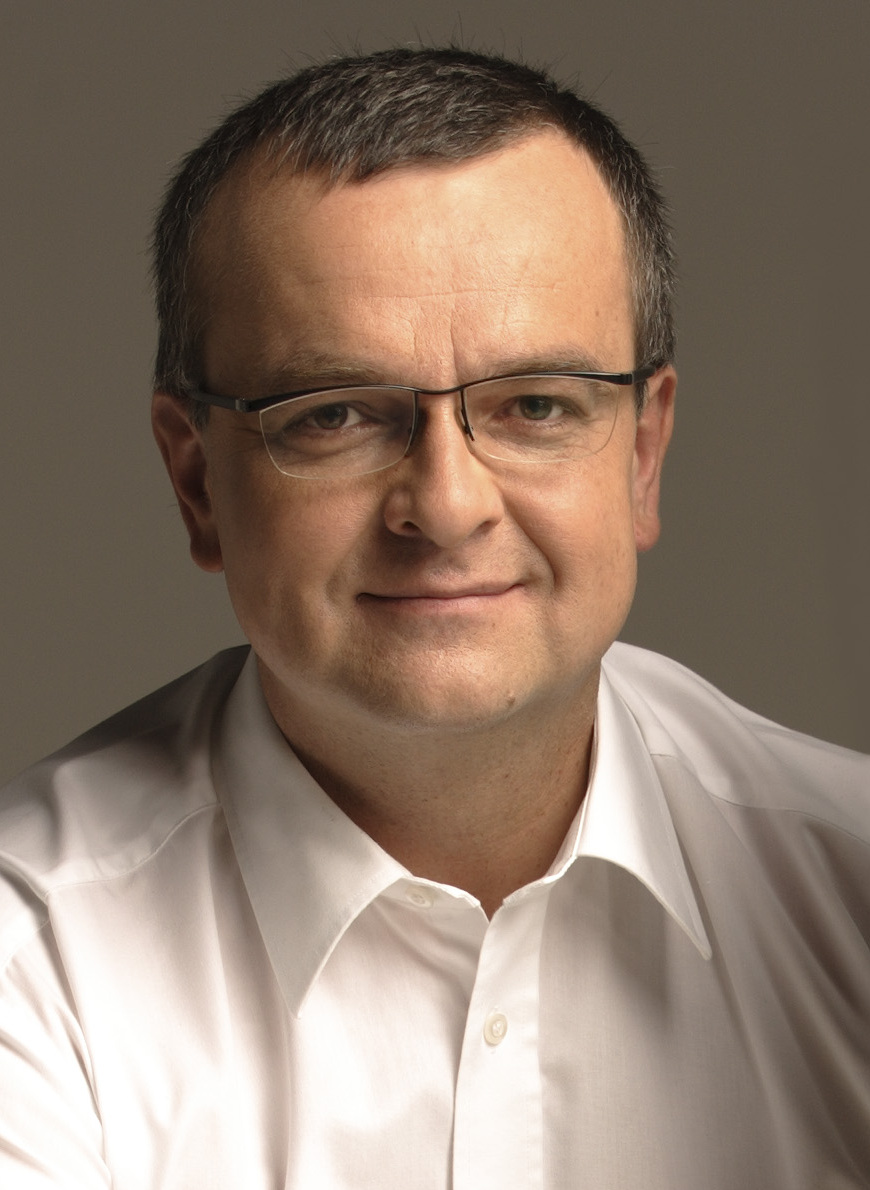
	First party	Second party	Third party
Leader	Mirek Topolánek	Miroslav Grebeníček	Stanislav Gross
Party	ODS	KSČM	ČSSD
Seats won	291	157	105
Popular vote	769,848	416,807	297,083
Percentage	36.4%	19.7	14.0%
	Fourth party
Leader	Miroslav Kalousek
Party	Christian and Democratic Union – Czechoslovak People's Party
Seats won	72
Popular vote	226,016
Percentage	10.7%
Chairman of Regional Association before election
Evžen Tošenovský
ODS
Elected Chairman of Regional Association
Evžen Tošenovský
ODS

Regional elections were held in the Czech Republic to elect the Regional Councils of 13 regions (all except Prague) on 5–6 November 2004. They were won by Civic Democratic Party (ODS), whilst the ruling Czech Social Democratic Party (ČSSD) was heavily defeated, finishing third.

== Results ==
Party	Votes	%	Seats
Civic Democratic Party	769,848	36.36	291
Communist Party of Bohemia and Moravia	416,807	19.68	157
Czech Social Democratic Party	297,083	14.03	105
Christian and Democratic Union – Czechoslovak People's Party	226,016	10.67	72
Coalition for Pardubice region	29,384	1.38	12
Association of Independent Candidates	69,591	3.28	11
Party for the Open Society	16,739	0.79	7
Coalition for Central Bohemian region	18,380	0.86	4
European Democrats	14,056	0.66	3
SNK European Democrats	13,699	0.63	3
European Democrats and Independent Mayors for region	8,117	0.38	3
Others	32,595	1.54	4

== Opinion polls ==
Date	Polling Firm	ODS	ČSSD	KSČM	KDU-ČSL	SNK ED	NEZ	SZ	US-DEU	Others
24 Oct 2004	CVVM	35.0	24.0	15.5	11.5		3.0		1.5	
22 Oct 2004	Factum Invenio	11.7	9.3	8.0	6.5	4.1	3.5	2.1	1.3	
