= Communist Youth Union =

Communist Youth Union Komunistický svaz mládeže
- Flag
- Founded: 1990
- Headquarters: Politických vězňů 9, Prague
- Ideology: Communism; Marxism-Leninism; Anti-capitalism
- Position: Far-left
- Colours
- International affiliation: World Federation of Democratic Youth
- Website: www.ksm.cz

The Communist Youth Union (Czech: Komunistický svaz mládeže) is a youth organization, unofficially cooperated with the Communist Party of Bohemia and Moravia. It was founded in 1990. The Czech Ministry of Interior dissolved KSM in 2006 due to its radical stances. It was reestablished in 2010.

The Communist Youth Union is the only WFDY member organization in the Czech Republic.
