= 1994 Czech municipal elections =

Elections in the Czech Republic

← 1990	18–19 November 1994	1998 →
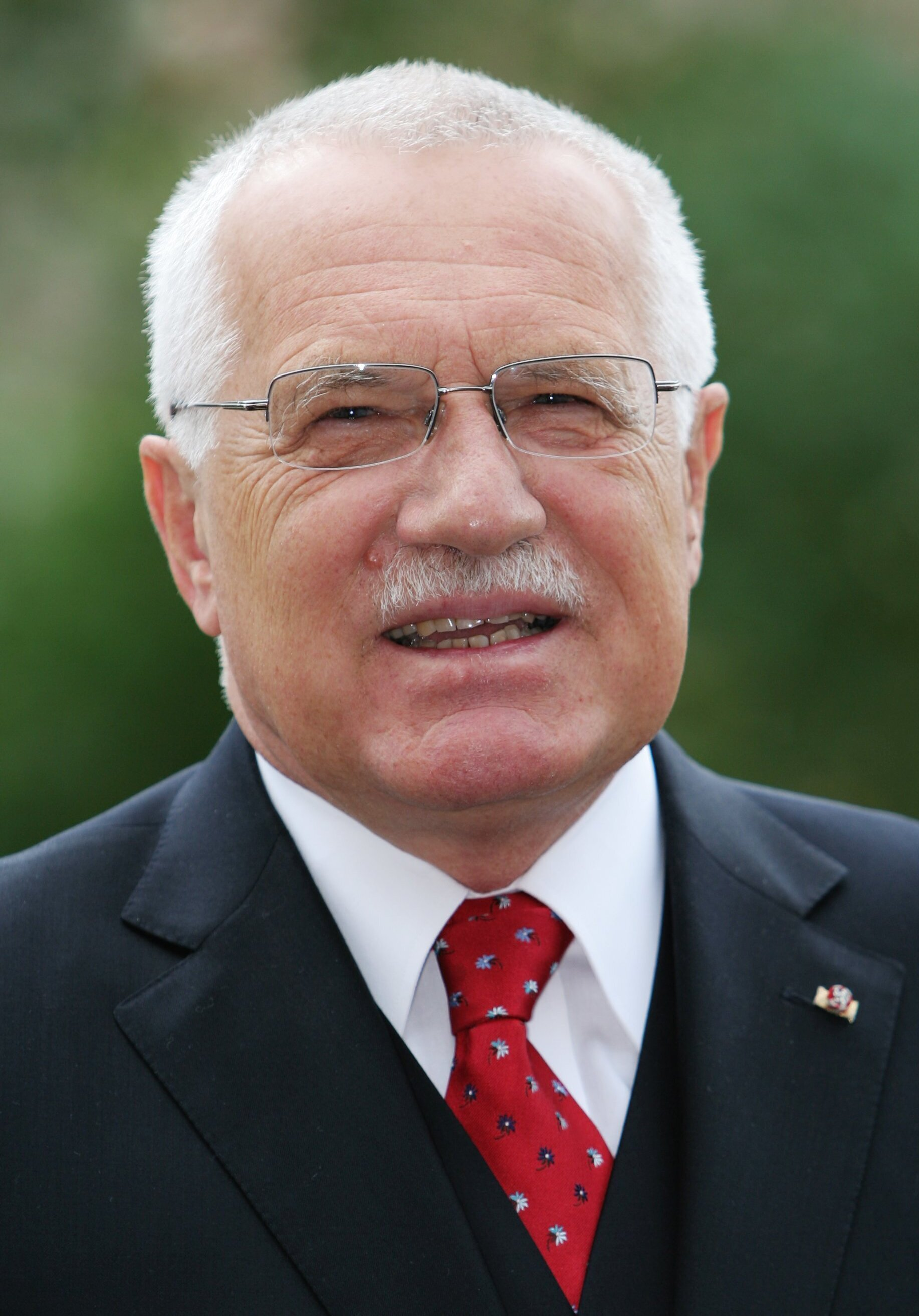

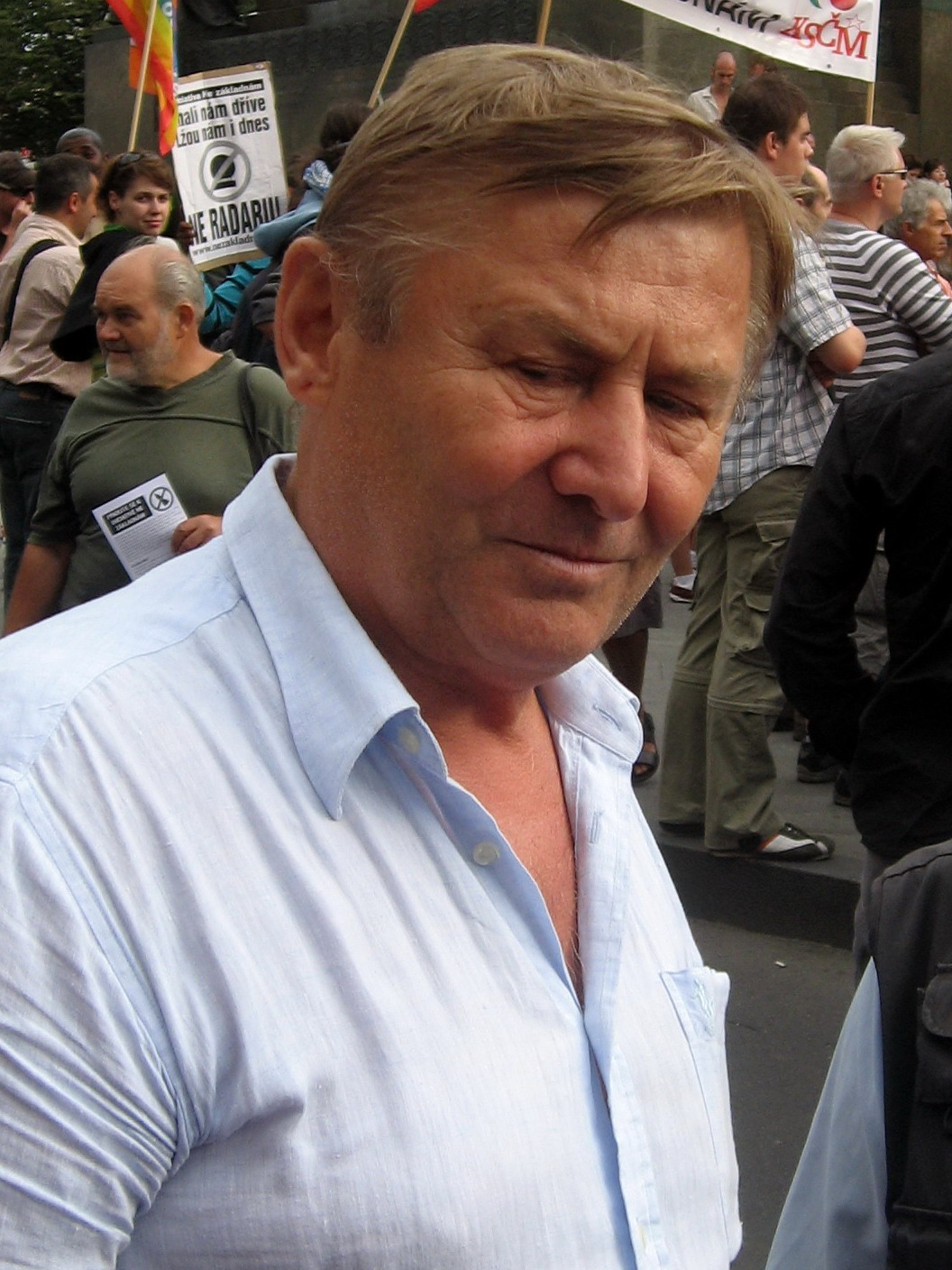

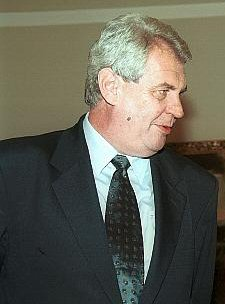

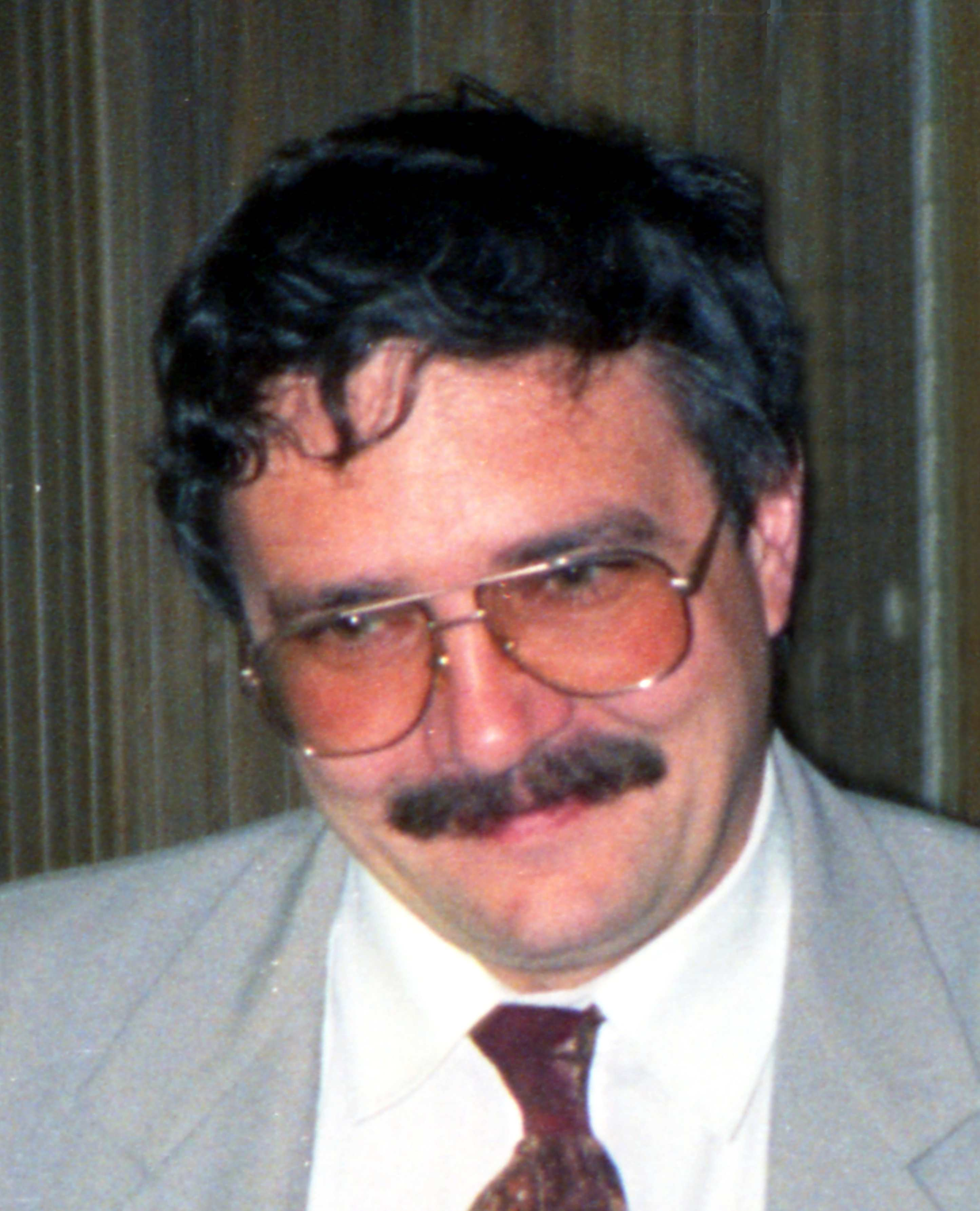
Party	ODS	KSČM
Popular vote	37,872,640	17,413,545
Percentage	29.6%	13.6%
Party	ČSSD	Lidovci
Popular vote	10,935,889	9,260,542
Percentage	8.5%	8.2

Municipal elections were held in the Czech Republic on 18 and 19 November 1994. Voter turnout was 60.68%.

== Results ==
Party	Votes	%	Seats
Civic Democratic Party	37,872,640	29.56	7,289
Communist Party of Bohemia and Moravia	17,413,545	13.59	5,837
Czech Social Democratic Party	10,935,889	8.54	1,628
Christian and Democratic Union – Czechoslovak People's Party	9,260,542	7.23	7,616
Civic Democratic Alliance	8,973,999	7.00	615
