= 2006 Czech municipal elections =

- 20–21 October 2006

All 62,426 seats in municipal councils
- Turnout: 46.38%
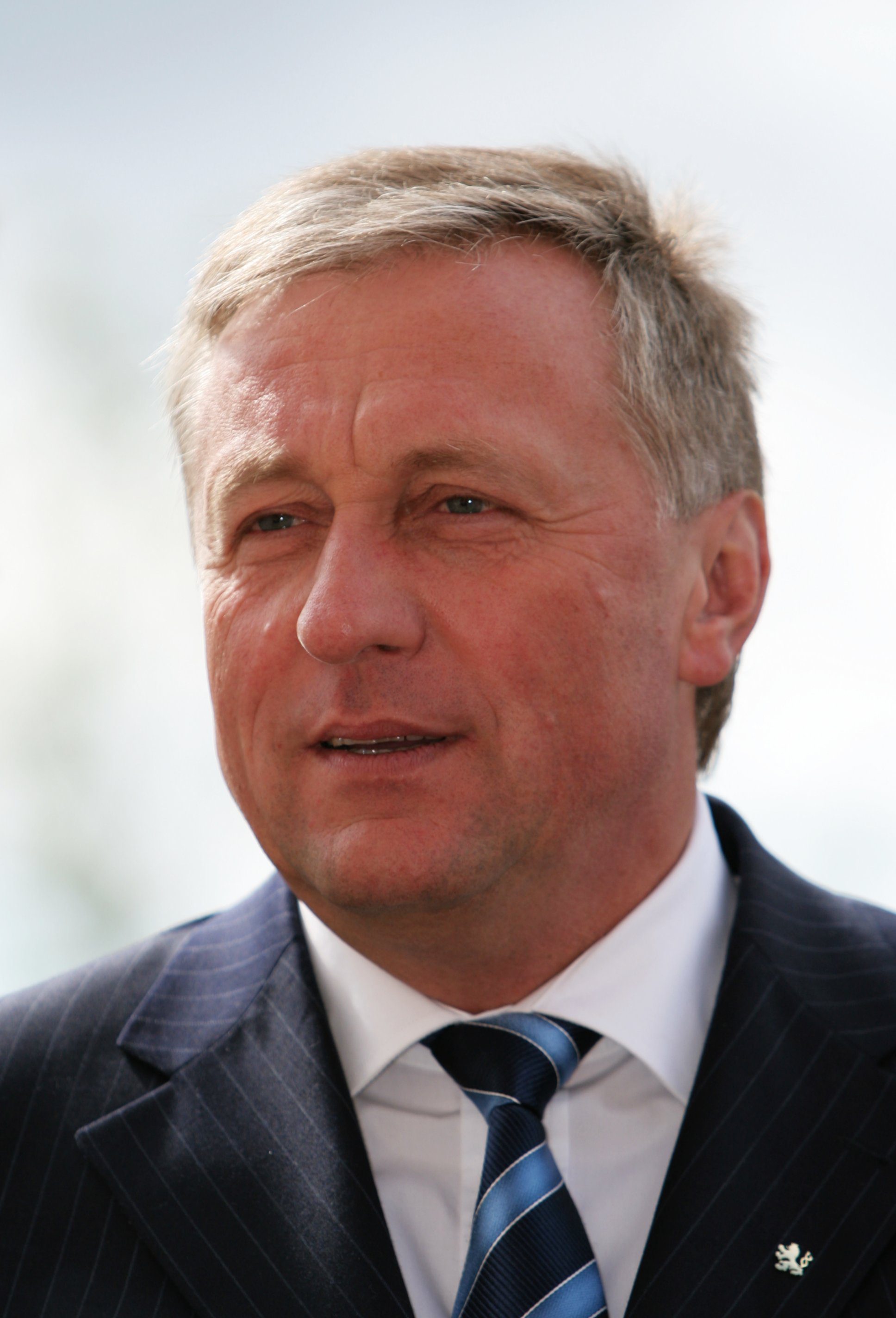

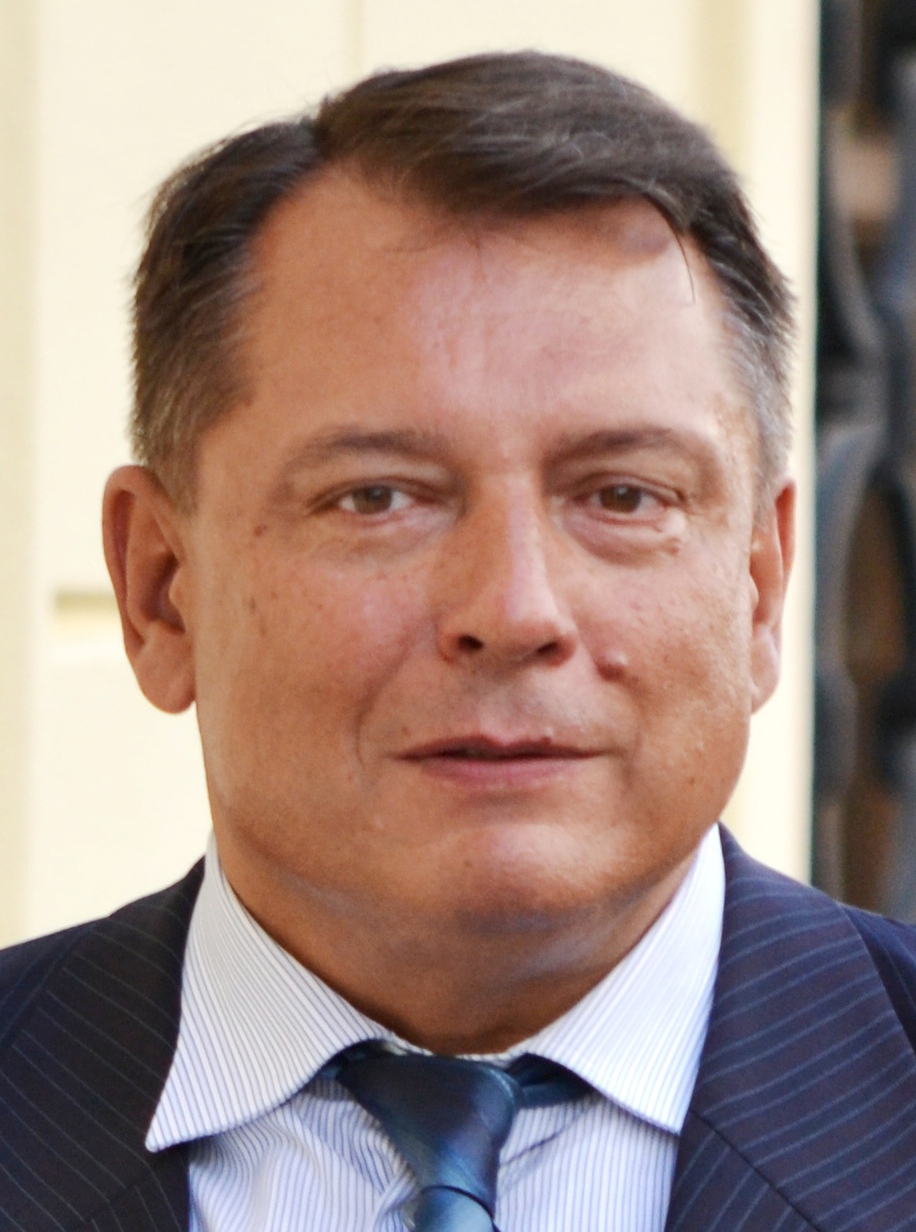

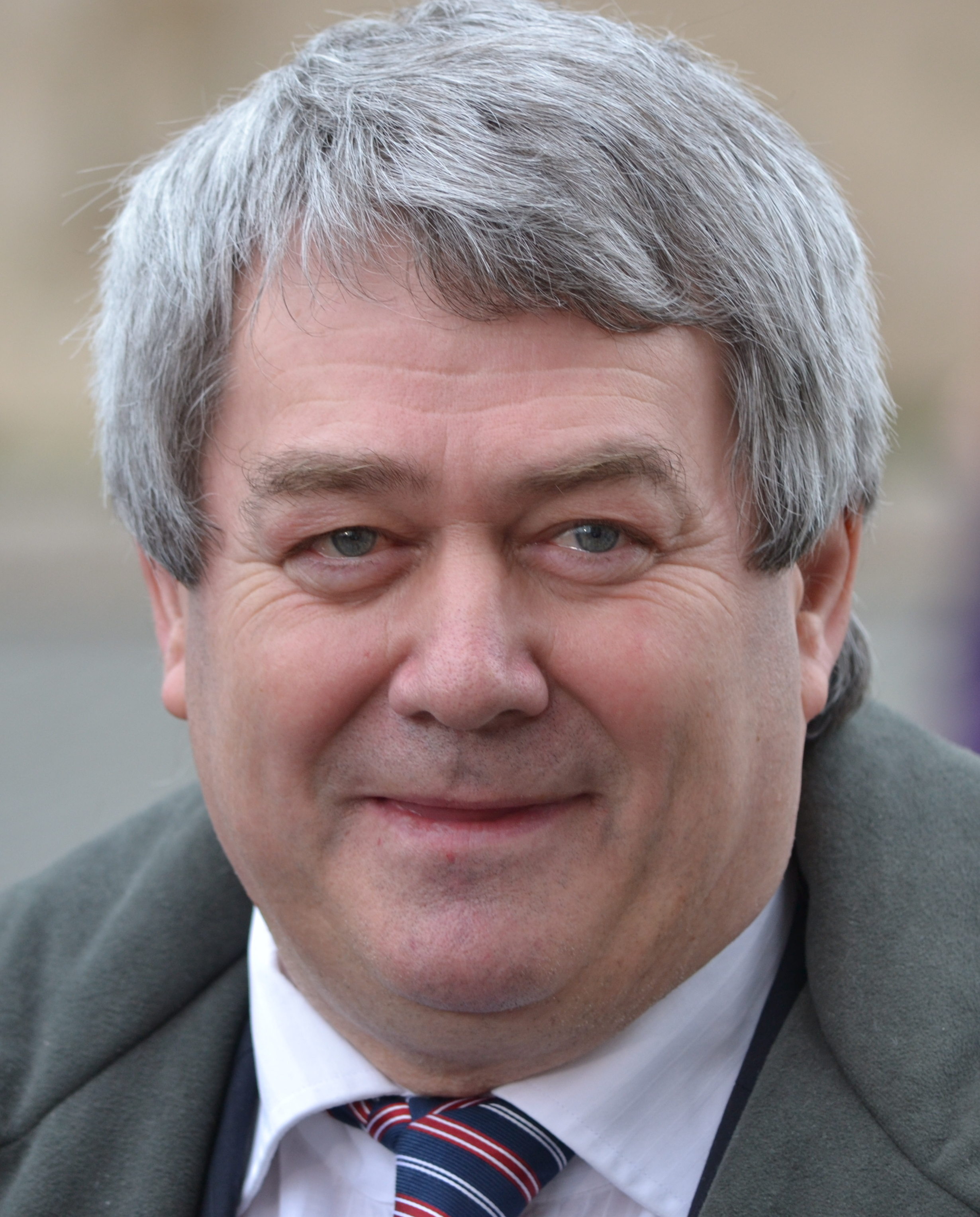

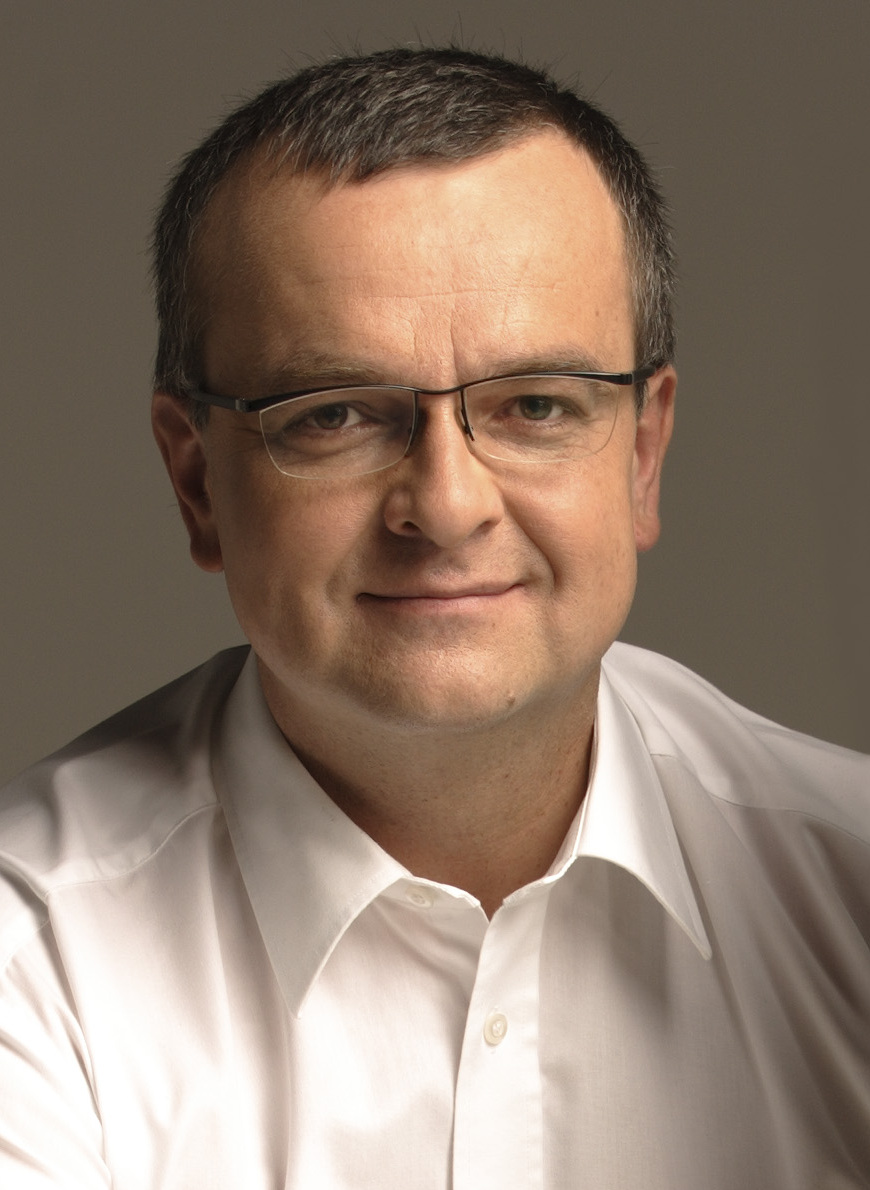

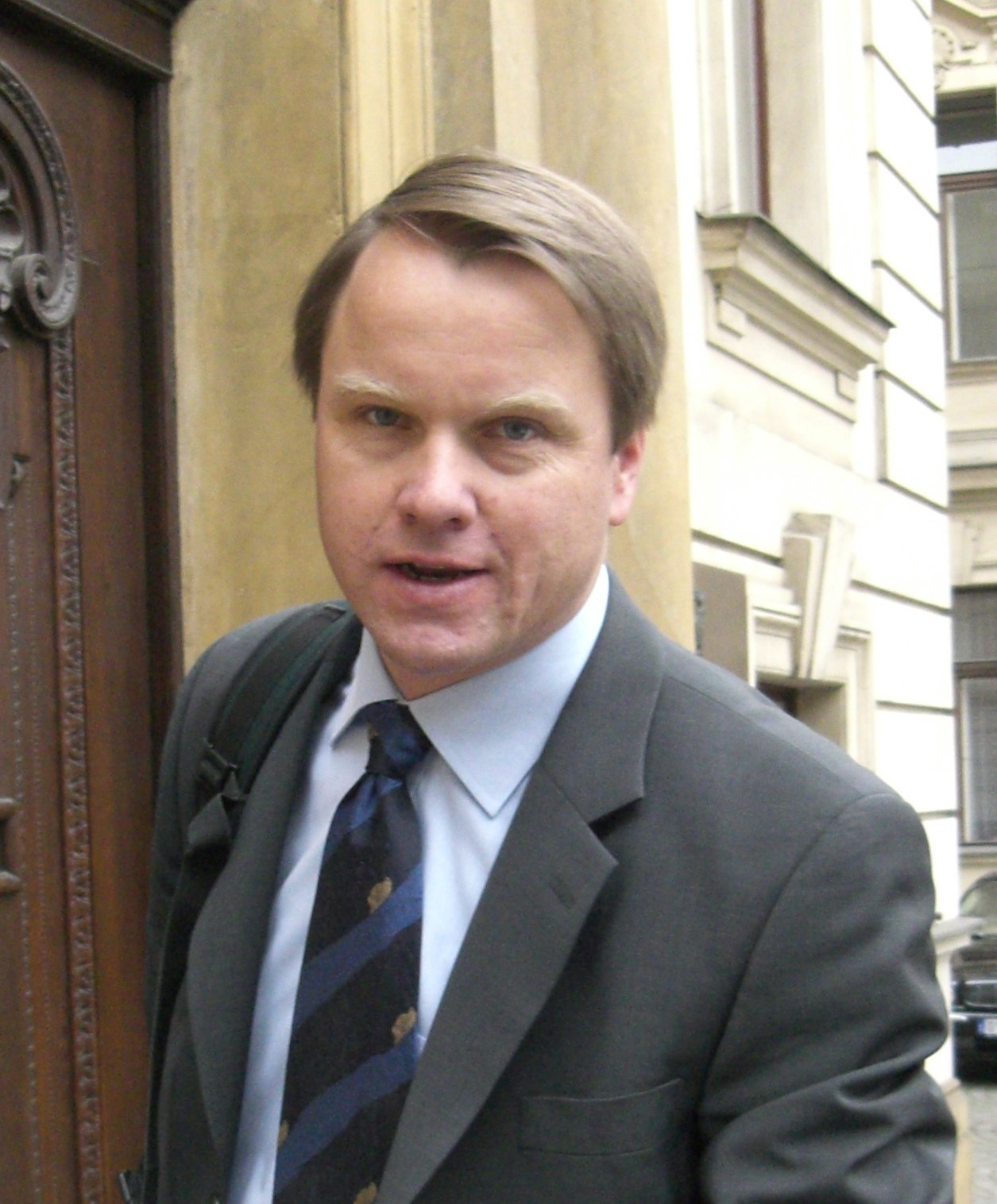

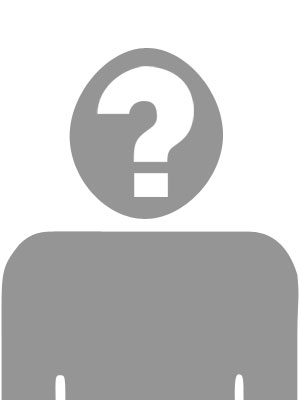
	First party	Second party	Third party
Leader	Mirek Topolánek	Jiří Paroubek	Vojtěch Filip
Party	ODS	ČSSD	KSČM
Seats won	7,033	4,332	4,268
Popular vote	39,353,957	18,079,942	11,730,243
Percentage	36.2%	16.6%	10.8%
	Fourth party	Fifth party	Sixth party
Leader	Miroslav Kalousek	Martin Bursík	Josef Zieleniec
Party	KDU-ČSL	Greens	SNK ED
Seats won	5,049	408	1,284
Popular vote	6,263,980	5,475,862	3,858,734
Percentage	5,8%	5.0%	3.6%

Municipal elections were held in the Czech Republic on 20 October and 21 October 2006. The Civic Democratic Party received 35% of the vote, winning more seats than any other party.

== Results ==
Party	Votes	%	Seats
Civic Democratic Party	39,353,957	36.20	7,033
Czech Social Democratic Party	18,079,942	16.63	4,332
Communist Party of Bohemia and Moravia	11,730,243	10.79	4,268
KDU-ČSL	6,263,980	5.76	5,049
Green Party	5,475,862	5.04	408
SNK European Democrats	3,858,734	3.55	1,284
Vote for the City	1,097,815	1.01	185
Other parties	22,837,144	21.01	39,867
Total	108,697,677	100.00	62,426
