= 2008 Czech regional elections =

- 17–18 October 2008

675 seats on 13 Regional Councils
- Turnout: 40.3%
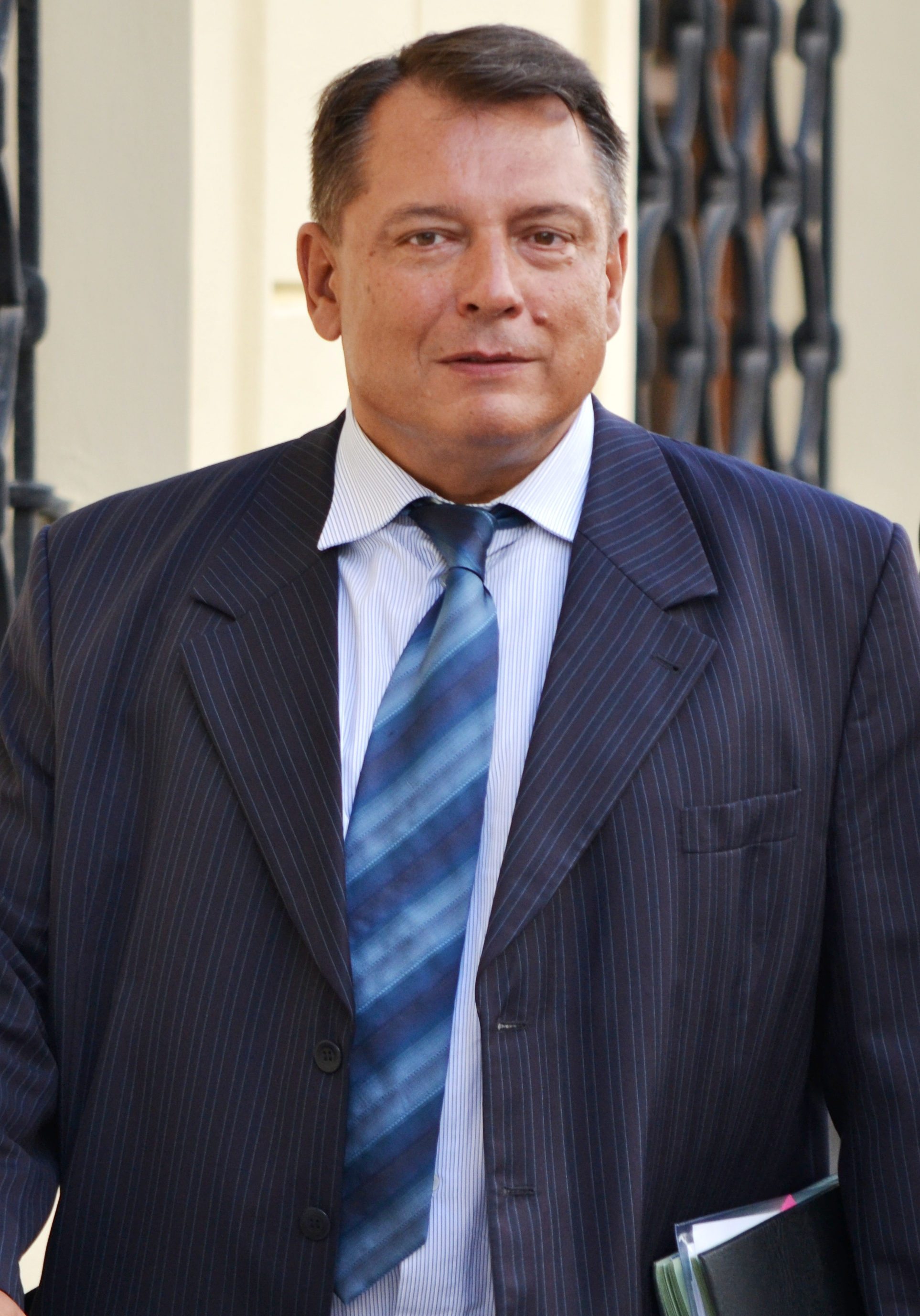

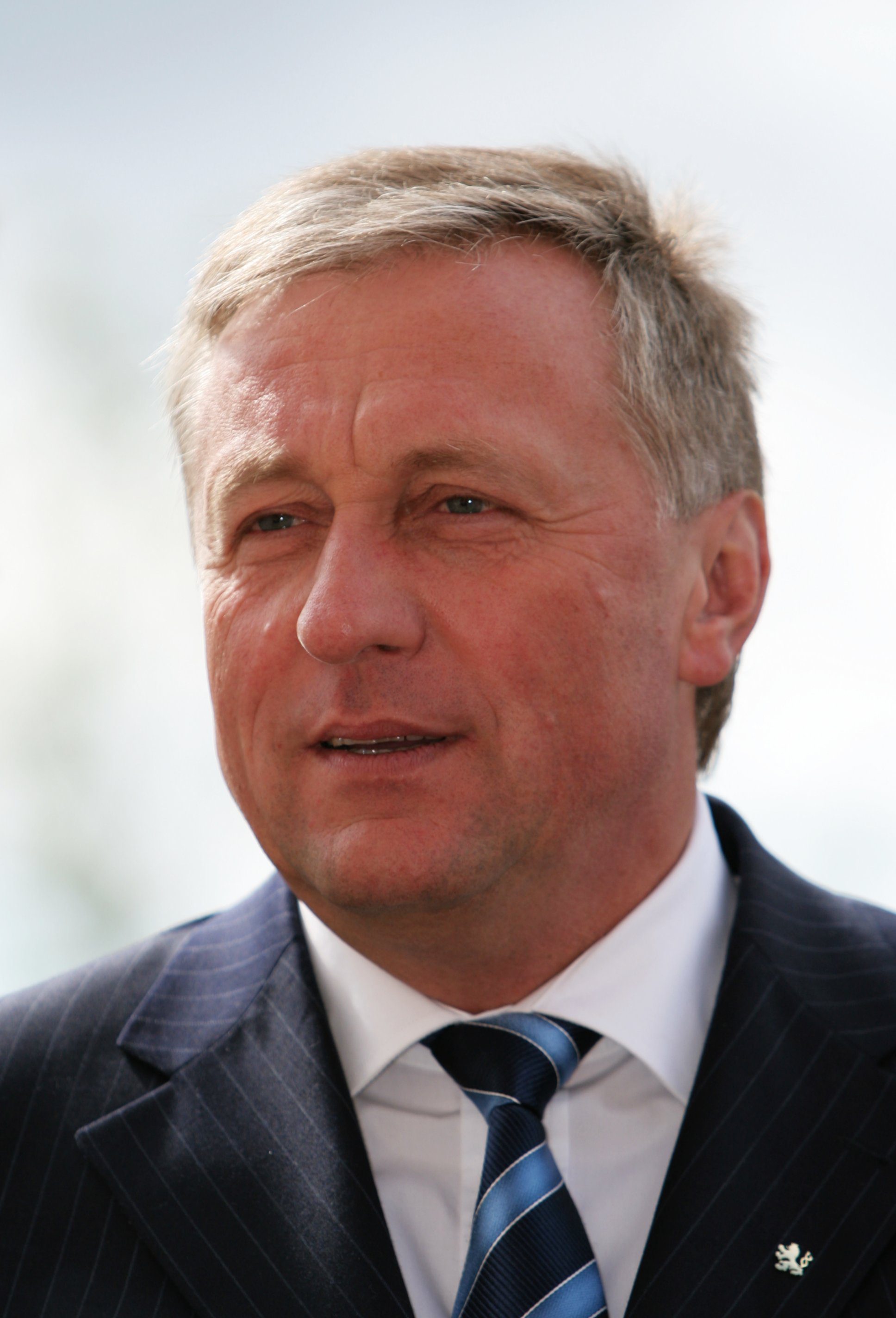
	First party	Second party
Leader	Jiří Paroubek	Mirek Topolánek
Party	ČSSD	ODS
Seats won	280	180
Popular vote	1,044,719	687,005
Percentage	35.85%	23.57%
Chairman of Regional Association before election
Evžen Tošenovský
ODS
Elected Chairman of Regional Association
Michal Hašek
ČSSD

Regional elections were held in the Czech Republic to elect the Regional Councils in 13 regions (all except Prague) on 17 and 18 October 2008. The elections were won by the opposition Czech Social Democratic Party (ČSSD), which won in every region.

== Results ==
Party	Votes	%	Seats
Czech Social Democratic Party	1,044,719	35.85	280
Civic Democratic Party	687,005	23.57	180
Communist Party of Bohemia and Moravia	438,024	15.03	114
Christian and Democratic Union – Czechoslovak People's Party	193,911	6.65	56
Green Party	92,057	3.15	0
SNK European Democrats	36,719	1.26	6
Independent Mayors for Region	35,584	1.22	7
NorthBohemians.cz	31,910	1.09	8
Others	353,713	12.14	130
Total	2,913,642	100	675
