= Communist Party of Bohemia and Moravia =

Communist Party of Bohemia and Moravia Komunistická strana Čech a Moravy
- Abbreviation: KSČM
- Chair: Roman Roun
- First Deputy Leader: Petr Šimůnek
- Deputy Leader: Milan Krajča
- Founded: 31 March 1990
- Preceded by: Communist Party of Czechoslovakia
- Headquarters: Politických vězňů 1531/9, Prague
- Newspaper: Naše pravda
- Think tank: Institute of the Czech Left
- Youth wing: Young Communists; Communist Youth Union
- Membership (2025): 16,843
- Ideology: Communism; Anti-capitalism; Euroscepticism; Social conservatism National conservatism
- Political position: Left-wing to far-left
- National affiliation: Communist Party of Czechoslovakia (1990–1992); Left Bloc (1992–1994); Stačilo! (since 2023)
- European affiliation: Party of the European Left (observer)
- European Parliament group: The Left (2004–2024); Non-Inscrits (2024–2026)
- International affiliation: IMCWP; World Anti-Imperialist Platform (disputed)
- Colours: Red
- Slogan: S lidmi pro lidi! ('With the people for the people!')
- Chamber of Deputies: 0 / 200
- Senate: 0 / 81
- European Parliament: 0 / 21
- Regional councils: 32 / 675
- Local councils: 94 / 61,677

Party flag

Website
- kscm.cz
- Politics of the Czech Republic; Political parties; Elections; A: The party is also described as left-conservative, given its more conservative stances on sociocultural issues.

The Communist Party of Bohemia and Moravia (Czech: Komunistická strana Čech a Moravy, KSČM) is a communist party in the Czech Republic. It is variously described as left-wing, or far-left, on the political spectrum. It is one of the few former ruling parties in post-Communist Central Eastern Europe which has not dropped the word Communist from its name, although it has changed its party program to adhere to laws adopted after 1989. It is an observer of the Party of the European Left, and was previously a member party of The Left group in the European Parliament.

For most of the first two decades after the Velvet Revolution, the party was politically isolated and accused of extremism, but later moved closer to the Czech Social Democratic Party (ČSSD). After the 2012 Czech regional elections, KSČM began governing in coalition with the ČSSD in 10 regions. It has never been part of a governing coalition in the executive branch but provided parliamentary support to Andrej Babiš' Second Cabinet until April 2021. The party's youth organization was banned from 2006 to 2010, and there have been calls from other parties to outlaw the main party. Until 2013, it was the only political party in the Czech Republic printing its own newspaper, Haló noviny, since replaced by the weekly Naše pravda. The party's two cherry logo comes from the song Le Temps des cerises, a revolutionary song associated with the Paris Commune.

== History ==
The party was formed in 1989 by a congress of the Communist Party of Czechoslovakia (KSČ), which decided to create a party for the territories of Bohemia and Moravia (including Czech Silesia), the areas that were to become the Czech Republic. The new party's organization was significantly more democratic and decentralized than the previous party, and gave local district branches of the party significant autonomy.

In 1990, KSČ was reorganized as a federation of KSČM and the Communist Party of Slovakia (KSS). Later, KSS changed its name to the Party of the Democratic Left, and the federation dissolved in 1992. During the party's first congress, held in Olomouc in October 1990, party leader Jiří Svoboda attempted to reform the party into a democratic socialist one, proposing a democratic socialist program and changing the name to the transitional Communist Party of Bohemia and Moravia: Party of Democratic Socialism. Svoboda had to balance the criticisms of older, conservative communists, who made up a majority of the party's members, with the demands of an increasingly large and moderate bloc of members, led primarily by a group of young KSČM parliamentarians called the Democratic Left, who demanded the immediate social democratization of the party. Delegates approved the new program but rejected the name change.

During 1991 and 1992, factional tensions increased, with the party's conservative, anti-revisionist wing increasingly vocal in criticizing Svoboda. There was an increase in popularity of the anti-revisionist Marxist–Leninist clubs amongst rank-and-file party members. On the party's other wing, the Democratic Left became increasingly critical of the slow pace of the reforms and began demanding a referendum of members to change the name. In December 1991, the Democratic Left split off and formed the short-lived Party of Democratic Labour. The referendum on changing the name was held in 1992, with 75.94% voting not to change the name.

The party's second congress, held in Kladno in December 1992, showed the increasing popularity of the party's anti-revisionist wing. It passed resolutions reinterpreting the 1990 program as a "starting point" for KSČM, rather than a definitive statement of a post-communist program. Svoboda, who was hospitalized due to an attack by an anti-communist, could not attend the congress but was nevertheless overwhelmingly re-elected. After the party's second congress in 1992, several groups split away. A group of post-communist delegates split off and merged with the Party of Democratic Labour to form the Party of the Democratic Left (SDL). Several independent left-wing members who had participated with KSČM in the 1992 electoral pact, which was called the Left Bloc, left the party to form the Left Bloc Party. Both groups eventually merged into the Party of Democratic Socialism.

In 1993, Svoboda attempted to expel the members of the "For Socialism" platform, a group in the party that wanted a restoration of the pre-1989 Communist regime; however, with only the lukewarm support of KSČM's central committee, he briefly resigned. He withdrew his resignation after the central committee agreed to move the party's next congress forward to June 1993 to resolve the issues of its name and ideology. At the 1993 congress, held in Prostějov, Svoboda's proposals were overwhelmingly rejected by two-thirds majorities. Svoboda did not seek re-election as chairman, and neocommunist Miroslav Grebeníček was elected chairman. Grebeníček and his supporters were critical of what they termed the inadequacies of the pre-1989 regime but supported the retention of the party's communist character and program. The members of the "For Socialism" platform were expelled at the congress, with the existence of platforms in the party being banned altogether, on the grounds that they gave too much influence to minority groups. Svoboda left the party.

"Conservative elements within the KSČM" were described as dominating the party's May 2004 Congress. The expelled members of "For Socialism" formed the Party of Czechoslovak Communists, later renamed the Communist Party of Czechoslovakia, which was led by Miroslav Štěpán. KSČM refuses to work with this group. The party was left on the sidelines for most of the first decade of the Czech Republic's existence. Václav Havel suspected KSČM was still an unreconstructed neo-Stalinist party and prevented it from having any influence during his presidency; however, the party provided the one-vote margin that elected Havel's successor Václav Klaus as president. After a long-running battle with the Ministry of the Interior, the Communist Youth Union led by Milan Krajča, was dissolved in 2006 for allegedly endorsing in its program the replacement of private with collective ownership of the means of production. The decision met with international protests.

In November 2008, the Czech Senate asked the Supreme Administrative Court to dissolve KSČM because of its political program, which the Senate argued contradicted the Constitution of the Czech Republic. 30 out of the 38 senators who were present agreed to this request, and expressed the view that the party's program did not reject violence as a means of attaining power and adopted The Communist Manifesto of Karl Marx. However, this was only a symbolic gesture, as according to the constitution only the cabinet may file a petition to the Supreme Administrative Court to dissolve a political party. For the first two decades after the end of communist rule in Czechoslovakia, the party was politically isolated. After the 2012 Czech regional elections, it started participating in coalitions with the Czech Social Democratic Party, forming part of the ruling coalition in 10 out of 13 regions. From 2018 to 2021, KSČM provided parliamentary support to Andrej Babiš' second cabinet.

After the party's poor performance in the 2021 Czech parliamentary election, in which KSČM failed to reach the 5% voting threshold and was excluded from representation in parliament for the first time in its history, Filip resigned as leader of the party. On 23 October 2021, Member of European Parliament Kateřina Konečná was elected as leader. In 2025, the Czech government passed an amendment to the national criminal code that introduces up to five years of prison for anyone who "establishes, supports or promotes Nazi, communist, or other movements which demonstrably aim to suppress human rights and freedoms or incite racial, ethnic, national, religious or class-based hatred". KSČM condemned the law, describing it as an attempt "to push KSČM outside the law and intimidate critics of the current regime". The amendment will come to force in 2026; it is not clear how the amendment will affect the party – in an interview with Novinky.cz, constitutional lawyer Jan Kysela argued that while KSČM's existence might not be in danger, the law could result in legal actions against its members.

In the 2025 Czech parliamentary election, the party's coalition Stačilo! won 4.3% of the vote, unexpectedly falling below the 5% electoral threshold necessary to win seats, despite some polls giving it over 7% days before the election. Reacting to the results, Kateřina Konečná stated that Stačilo! would continue despite the defeat, hoping that "left-wing issues will find their representation in all future elections." The party chair Daniel Sterzik declared that he would discuss his position with the party's board. The former deputy chairman of KSČM, Jiří Dolejš, attributed the party's failure to a "forced merger with SOCDEM".

In November 2025, the party appealed to the Constitutional Court to repeal the amendment to the Criminal Code, describing it an "unreasonable interference with political rights and freedoms" that "would allow for the prosecution of the propaganda of communism". However, the Constitutional Court rejected the appeal in December due to "unjusticiability of the petitioner". Numerous approaches to the law were considered by KSČM, including renaming the party, dissolving it, or renaming it to Stačilo!; ultimately, the party's November congress decided to retain the party's name and re-elected Kateřina Konečná as the party's leader, despite the electoral failure in October election. At the congress, the party delegates also passed a resolution "strongly rejecting the criminalization of supporters of the communist movement enshrined in the amended Criminal Code." The amendment to the Criminal Code became effective on 1 January 2026. KSČM and Stačilo! continued to exist as political parties.

On 30 May 2026, the party's spokesperson Roman Roun was elected as leader, beating vice-chair Milan Krajča in the second round of voting. In the 2026 Czech municipal elections, the party's coalition Ostravská levice won 1.69% of the vote, and lost its representation in the Ostrava city council for the first time in 81 years. On 21 October 2026, MEP Konečná announced that she had joined the far-right Patriots for Europe political group. Konečná's decision triggered significant internal backlash within the KSČM. Krajča openly condemned the move, stating that the decision had not been discussed with the party leadership. Krajča described the alignment with a right-wing and anti-communist political group as a fundamental political mistake, pointing out the group's ideological contradictions with the KSČM's positions on international policy. The head of the Prague Regional Committee, Petra Prokšanová, stated that no communist should join a political group which supports 'the genocide of the Palestinian people or the destabilization of socialist Cuba'. KSČM leader Roman Roun convened a meeting of the party's executive committee for 27 October. Konečná left KSČM in November 2026.

== Ideology ==
Political alignment of Czech political parties on a two-dimensional spectrum. In the TAN/GAL (sociocultural) dimension, KSČM is shown as more TAN (socially conservative) than KDU-ČSL.

As a communist party and the successor of the former ruling Communist Party of Czechoslovakia, its party platform promotes anti-capitalism and socialism. Unlike other communist parties in post-communist Europe, KSČM "refused to break away with its communist past and largely preserved its Marxist agenda". The party is also described as national communist. It is classified as a radical left party. It holds Eurosceptic views in regards to the European Union, and has been described as pro-Russian, pro-Chinese, left-authoritarian in that it "combines cultural conservativism with an economic left-wing stance", nativist, and left-conservative. It is conservative on sociocultural matters. The Green European Journal described it as "culturally conservative, Islamophobic, and anti-EU, with many pro-Russian and openly far-right personalities in its ranks." Ideologically, the party is very similar to Slovak Smer and German BSW. Political scientist Luke March also compares it to the Russian KPRF:

In particular, they are relatively weakly influenced by post-68 new left ideas or Eurocommunism, and some evidence of environmentalism in KSCM and KPRF platforms notwithstanding, these two parties remain far more socially conservative, materialist, and national-chauvinist than more reformist parties such as Rifondazione and even the PCF.

The party's platform is considered to be based on key tenets of socialist ideology, as it supports the re-nationalization of the water, gas, electricity and transportation industries, the expansion of worker cooperatives, and the introduction of communally-owned firms based on the economic model of socialist Czechoslovakia. The party argues that everyone should have a guaranteed right to a job, receiving a salary that corresponds to how demanding the job is, and that the minimum wage should correspond to half the national average income. KSČM also promotes a system of non-profit hospitals and a single state-owned health insurance company. It says it would be willing to participate in non-socialist governments as long as its six demands are met: regular increases in both the minimum wage and pensions, expanding public ownership of water utilities, extraction of natural resources only by domestic companies, construction of communal housing, and abolishing patient fees in health care.

Political scientist Maria Snegovaya wrote that "over the years, KSČM adopted a platform reminiscent of those used by populist right parties in other countries: protectionist on the economic dimension, Euroskeptic and nationalist on the sociocultural dimension". It rejects European integration as "capitalist" and "neoliberal", arguing that it is destructive to the living conditions of citizens and ignores social issues. KSČM is considered to be an anti-Western party, and opposes Czech membership of NATO on nationalist grounds, calling NATO "US- and Germany-dominated" and naming it, alongside the Lisbon Treaty, as "a threat to Czech state sovereignty that led to the exploitation of Czech interests by multinational capitalist forces". Party representatives also advocate for the legitimization of the Russian policy towards Ukraine, regarding Crimea as a Russian territory and opposing EU sanctions against Russia. In 2014, KSČM leader Vojtech Filip visited Russia, and party members served as election observers in the Donetsk People's Republic and the Luhansk People’s Republic.

Regarding the Gaza War, the KSČM "strongly condemns the ongoing aggression of the State of Israel against Lebanon, which follows a year of brutal Israeli aggression in the Palestinian Gaza Strip." KSČM is considered "a staunch ally of China, both in domestic and international contexts." Since the 1990s, members of the party have been frequently visiting China on state-organized tours, and the KSČM also attended a conference on Chinese policies in Xinjiang organized by the Chinese Communist Party. The party criticizes the Czech government for its support of Taiwan and "aggressive and interventionist stance on China". It argues that the Czech Republic should instead recognize One China principle and also accuses 'US-funded NGOs' on shaping the Czech foreign policy. Along with Russia and China, KSČM also expressed support for Cuba, Venezuela, and Belarus.

The party has been described as embracing "a socially conservative and nationalist platform in the democratic era". On the GAL-TAN (green/alternative/libertarian vs. traditional/authoritarian/nationalist) dimension used to measure sociocultural values, the KSČM is "a radical left party both in terms of its general positioning and economic stances, but characterised by holding traditional, authoritarian and nationalist (TAN) views." It was described as illiberal, and its sociocultural views are considered to be as TAN as the ones of KDU-ČSL. Jan Rovny of Sciences Po commented on the party: "Its socioeconomic program may be left-wing, but it is otherwise a nationalist, anti-immigrant, very conservative party." According to historian Stanislav Holubec, the party's former newspaper Haló noviny published "nationalistic, Stalinist, authoritarian and homophobic items".

The party does not present an official stance on LGBT issues. In 2014, 20 MPs from ODS, VV, LIDEM, ČSSD, TOP 09 and KSČM drafted an unsuccessful amendment to allow stepchild adoption within same-sex registered partnerships. In June 2018, 46 MPs from ANO, ČSSD, the Pirate Party, STAN, TOP 09 and KSČM introduced a draft bill to abolish registered partnerships and introduce same-sex marriage. However, the majority of KSČM MPs were opposed to same-sex marriage. Political scientist Tomáš Novotný described the party's view on same-sex marriage as "rather negative", while Balkan Insight wrote that the party is in "staunch opposition" to it. KSČM does not consider gender equality to be a policy aim, and voted against the Antidiscrimination Bill. The party also argues that immigrants are taking advantage of the Czech social system, including economic immigrants. It denounced the EU migration quota system, describing the EU as a "dictatorship" and declaring that the Czechs are "not pupils of Brussels".

After the election of Konečná as the leader of the party in 2021, KSČM "reinforced its image as a Eurosceptic, populist radical-left party, while increasingly shifting towards conservative and nationalist positions, particularly in its criticism of the European Union, migration, and LGBT policies". This was coupled with reinforcing its strongly pro-Russian position and the foundation of Stačilo!, where the party formed an alliance with nationalist-conservative parties which marked "a further departure from its left-wing roots." It is argued that KSČM underwent a "transformation towards a nationalist-populist party". At the same time, while increasingly adopting traditionalist, authoritarian and nationalist stances on social issues, the party preserved its economically communist character. Political scientist Michael Perottino argues that KSČM "clearly turned from red to “brown,” becoming less leftist than nationalist" and that the main traits of the party's ideology have become "sovereigntism and nationalism, pro-Russian positions at any cost, and the fight against NATO".

== Leaders ==
#	Name (Born–Died)	Portrait	Term of Office	
1	Jiří Machalík (b. 1945)		31 March 1990	13 October 1990
2	Jiří Svoboda (b. 1945)		13 October 1990	25 June 1993
3	Miroslav Grebeníček (b. 1947)		25 June 1993	1 October 2005
4	Vojtěch Filip (b. 1955)		1 October 2005	9 October 2021
5	Kateřina Konečná (b. 1981)		23 October 2021	30 May 2026
6	Roman Roun (b. 1971)		30 May 2026	present

== Electoral results ==
The voter base of KSČM is dominated by blue-collar workers and retired workers; it also preserves strong links to trade union activists, and 57% of its supporters are drawn from trade unions. About 20% of trade unions members are supporters of KSČM. The party's membership and voter structure shows a disproportional share of blue-collar workers, and working-class voters in general. The party's voter base is predominantly those who are dissatisfied with the functioning of Czech democracy, distrust public institutions, or live in areas with high levels of unemployment and crime. It is stronger among older than younger voters, with the majority of its membership over 60. The party is also stronger in small and medium-sized towns than in big cities.

=== Parliament ===
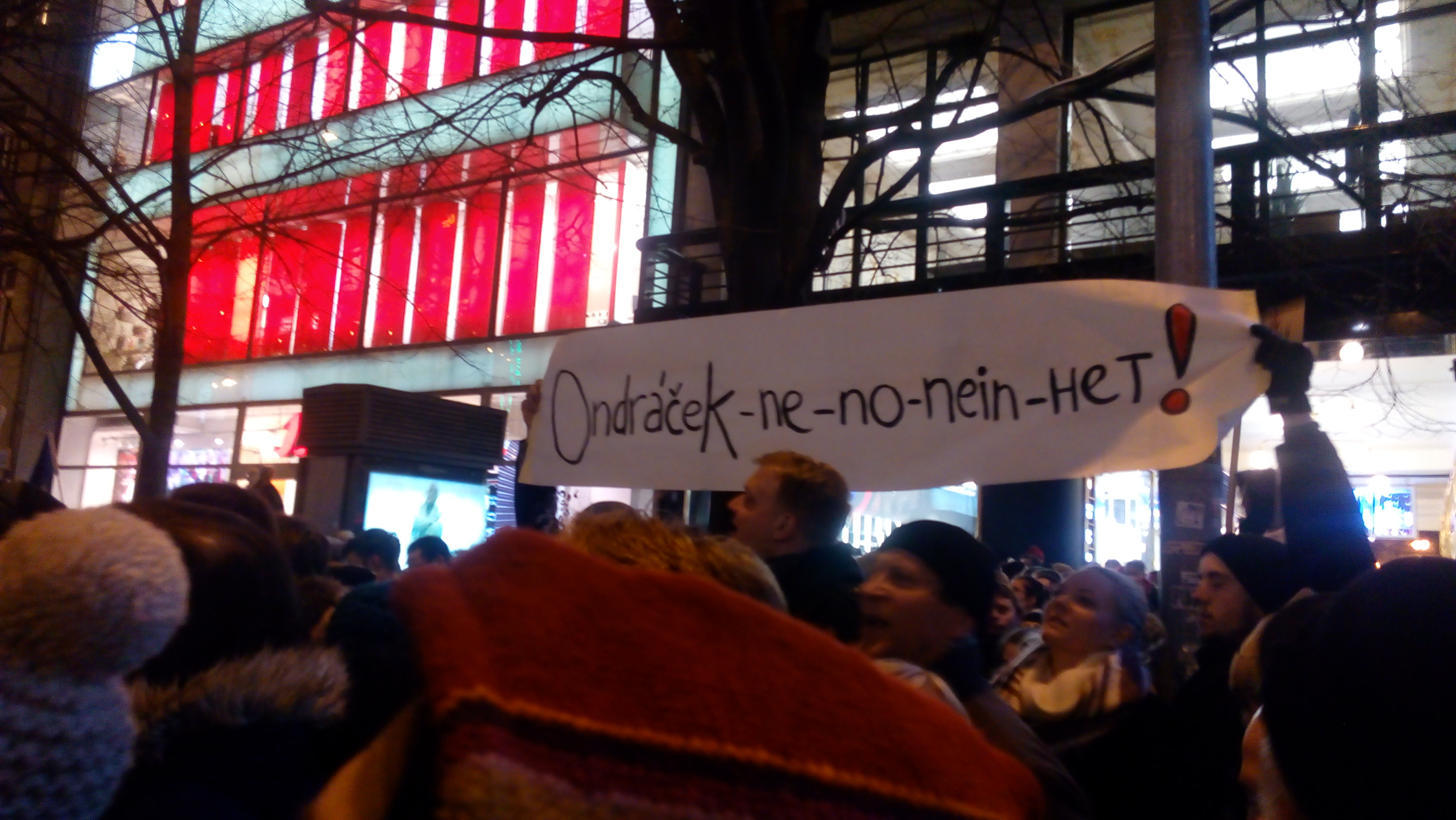
A protest against the election of Zdeněk Ondráček

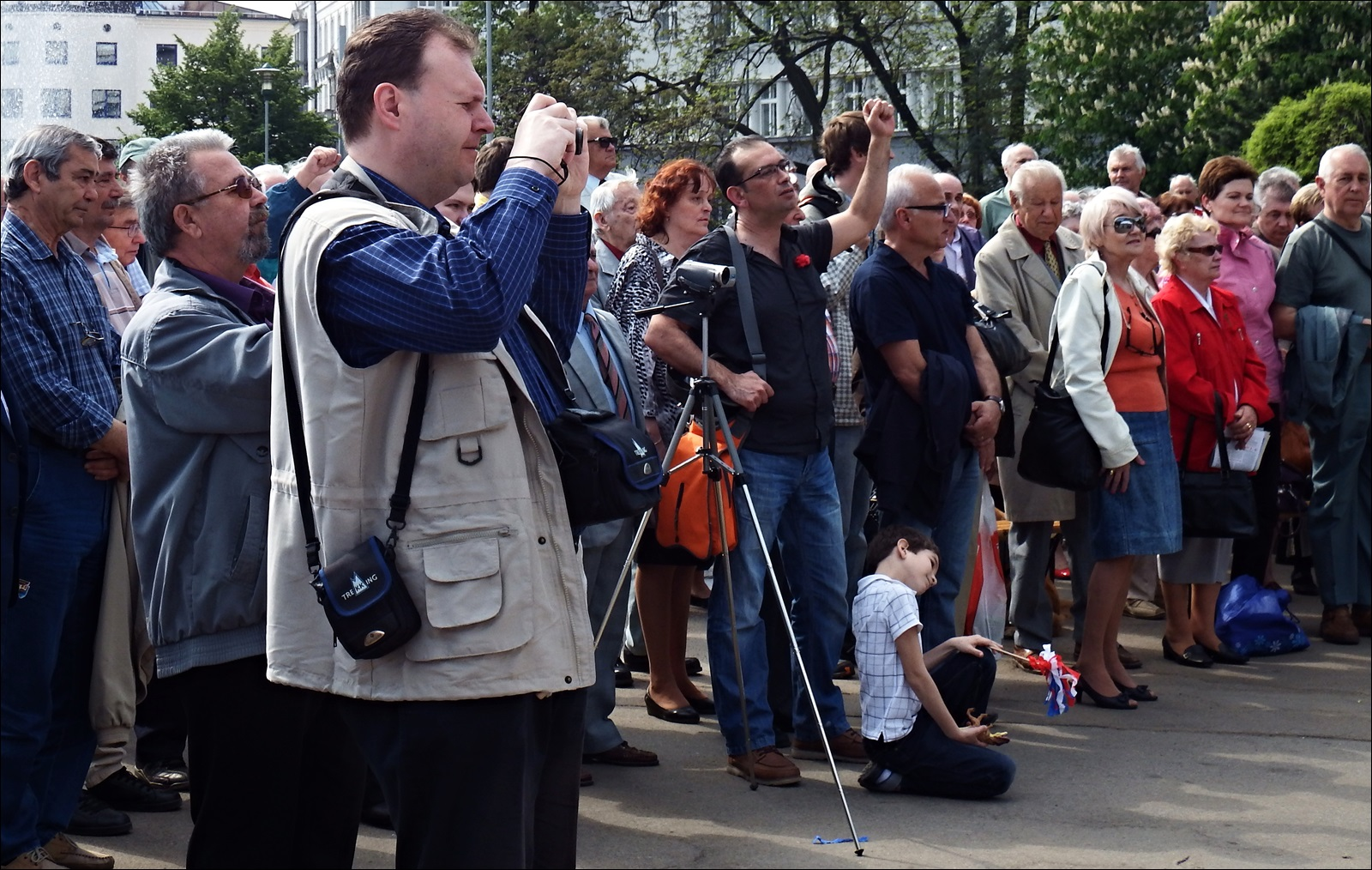
A May Day meeting in Brno organized by the party

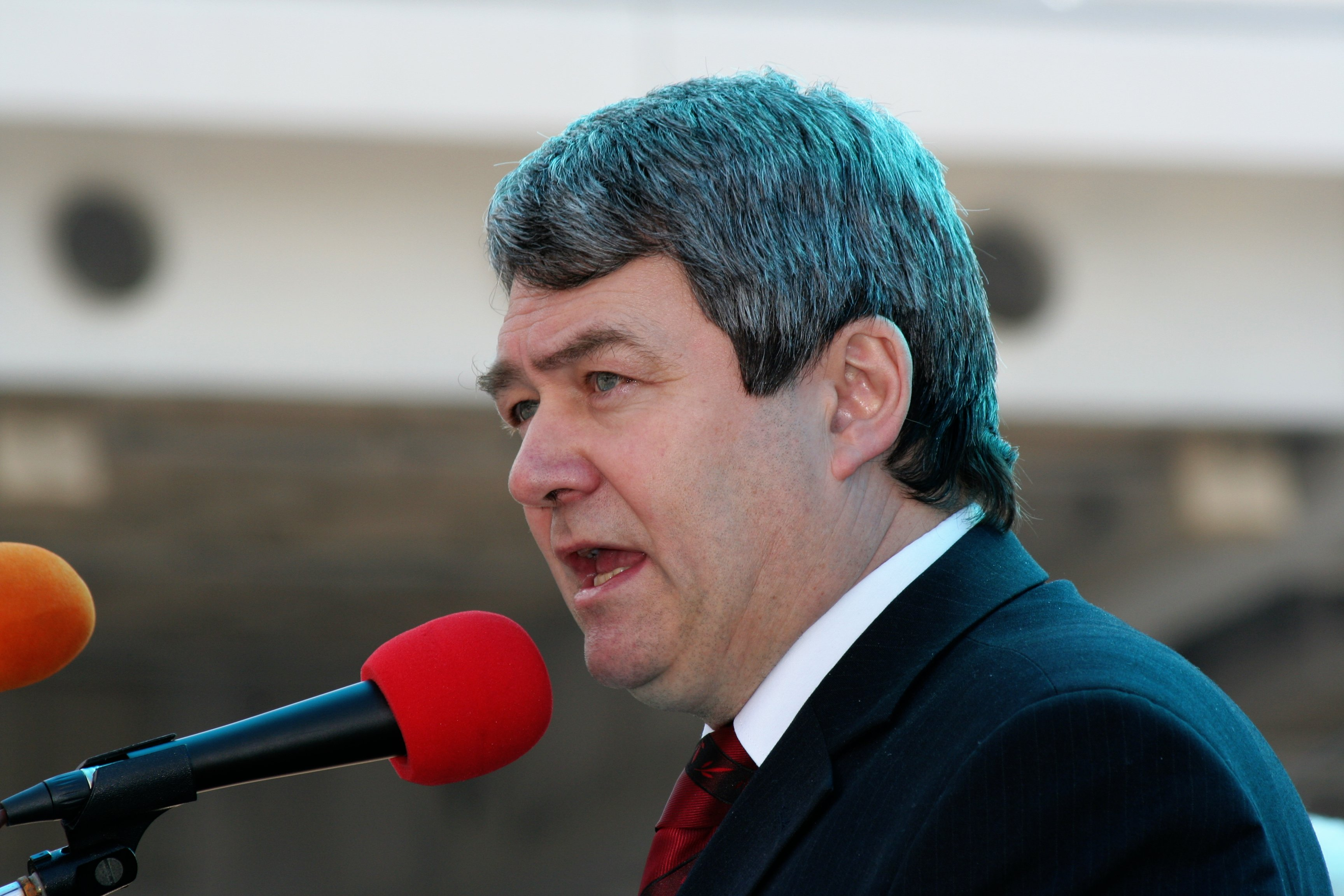
Former party leader Vojtěch Filip

==== Chamber of Deputies ====
Chamber of Deputies of the Parliament of the Czech Republic
Year	Leader	Votes	%	Seats	±	Place	Position
1990	Jiří Machalík	954,690	13.2	33 / 200	New	2nd	Opposition
1992	Jiří Svoboda	909,490	14.0 (Note: In 1992, KSČM participated in the Left Bloc, an electoral alliance with smaller left-wing groups and independents.)	35 / 200	▲2	2nd	Opposition
1996	Miroslav Grebeníček	626,136	10.3	22 / 200	▼13	3rd	Opposition
1998	Miroslav Grebeníček	658,550	11.0	24 / 200	▲2	3rd	Opposition
2002	Miroslav Grebeníček	882,653	18.5	41 / 200	▲17	3rd	Opposition
2006	Vojtěch Filip	685,328	12.8	26 / 200	▼15	3rd	Opposition
2010	Vojtěch Filip	589,765	11.3	26 / 200	0	4th	Opposition
2013	Vojtěch Filip	741,044	14.9	33 / 200	▲7	3rd	Opposition
2017	Vojtěch Filip	393,100	7.8	15 / 200	▼18	5th	Confidence and supply
2021	Vojtěch Filip	193,817	3.6	0 / 200	▼15	7th	No seats
2025	Kateřina Konečná	242,031	4.3	0 / 200	0	7th	No seats
2025	Part of Stačilo!, which won 0 seats in total						

Notes

KSCM 1996

KSCM 1998

KSCM 2002

KSCM 2006

KSCM 2010

KSCM 2013

KSCM 2017

KSCM 2021

==== Senate ====
Senate of the Parliament of the Czech Republic
Year	First round		Second round		No. of seats won	No. of overall seats won	±
Year	Votes	%	Votes	%	No. of seats won	No. of overall seats won	±
1996	393,494	14.3	45,304	2.0	2 / 81	2 / 81	New
1998	159,123	16.5	31,097	5.8	2 / 27	4 / 81	▲2
2000	152,934	17.8	73,372	13.0	0 / 27	3 / 81	▼1
2002	110,171	16.5	57,434	7.0	1 / 27	3 / 81	0
2004	125,892	17.4	65,136	13.6	1 / 27	2 / 81	▼1
2006	134,863	12.7	26,001	4.5	0 / 27	2 / 81	0
2008	147,186	14.1	did not make it	did not make it	1 / 27	3 / 81	▲1
2010	117,374	10.2	did not make it	did not make it	0 / 27	2 / 81	▼1
2012	153,335	17.4	79,663	15.5	1 / 27	2 / 81	0
2014	99,973	9.74	did not make it	did not make it	0 / 27	1 / 81	▼1
2016	83,741	9.50	5,737	1.35	0 / 27	1 / 81	0
2018	80,371	7.38	3,578	0.86	0 / 27	0 / 81	▼1
2020	40,994	4.11	did not make it	did not make it	0 / 27	0 / 81	0
2022	17,612	1.60	did not make it	did not make it	0 / 27	0 / 81	0
2024	14,321	1.80	did not make it	did not make it	0 / 27	0 / 81	0
2026	9,181	0.80	did not make it	did not make it	0 / 27	0 / 81	0

=== European Parliament ===
Election	List leader	Votes	%	Seats	+/−	EP Group
2004	Miloslav Ransdorf	472,862	20.27 (#2)	6 / 24	New	GUE/NGL
2009	Miloslav Ransdorf	334,577	14.18 (#3)	4 / 22	▼2	GUE/NGL
2014	Kateřina Konečná	166,478	10.99 (#4)	3 / 21	▼1	GUE/NGL
2019	Kateřina Konečná	164,624	6.94 (#7)	1 / 21	▼2	The Left
2024 (Note: Run as part of the Stačilo! coalition.)	Kateřina Konečná	283,935	9.56 (#4)	1 / 21	0	NI

=== Local councils ===
Year	Votes	%	Seats
1994	17,413,545	13.6	5,837 / 62,160
1998	10,703,975	13.7	5,748 / 62,920
2002	11 696 976	14.5	5,702 / 62,494
2006	11,730,243	10.8	4,268 / 62,426
2010	8,628,685	9.6	3,189 / 62,178
2014	7,730,503	7.8	2,510 / 62,300
2018	5,416,907	4.9	1,426 / 62,300
2022	2,093,505	1.9	466 / 62,300
2026	658,982	0.6	94 / 62,300

=== Regional councils ===
Year	Votes	%	Seats	±	Place
2000	496,688	21.1	161 / 675	New	3rd
2004	416,807 ▼	19.7 ▼	157 / 675	▼	2nd
2008	438,024 ▲	15.0 ▼	114 / 675	▼	3rd
2012	538,953 ▲	20.4 ▲	182 / 675	▲	2nd
2016	267,047 ▼	10.6 ▼	86 / 675	▼	3rd
2020	131,770 ▼	4.8 ▼	13 / 675	▼	9th
2024 (Note: Ran as part of the Stačilo! coalition.)	147,594 ▲	6.2 ▲	40 / 685	▲	5th

== Bibliography ==
- Bozóki, András; Ishiyama, John (2002). The Communist Successor Parties of Central and Eastern Europe. Routledge. ISBN 978-0-7656-0986-1.
