= 2000 Czech regional elections =

- 12 November 2000

675 seats
- Turnout: 33.64%
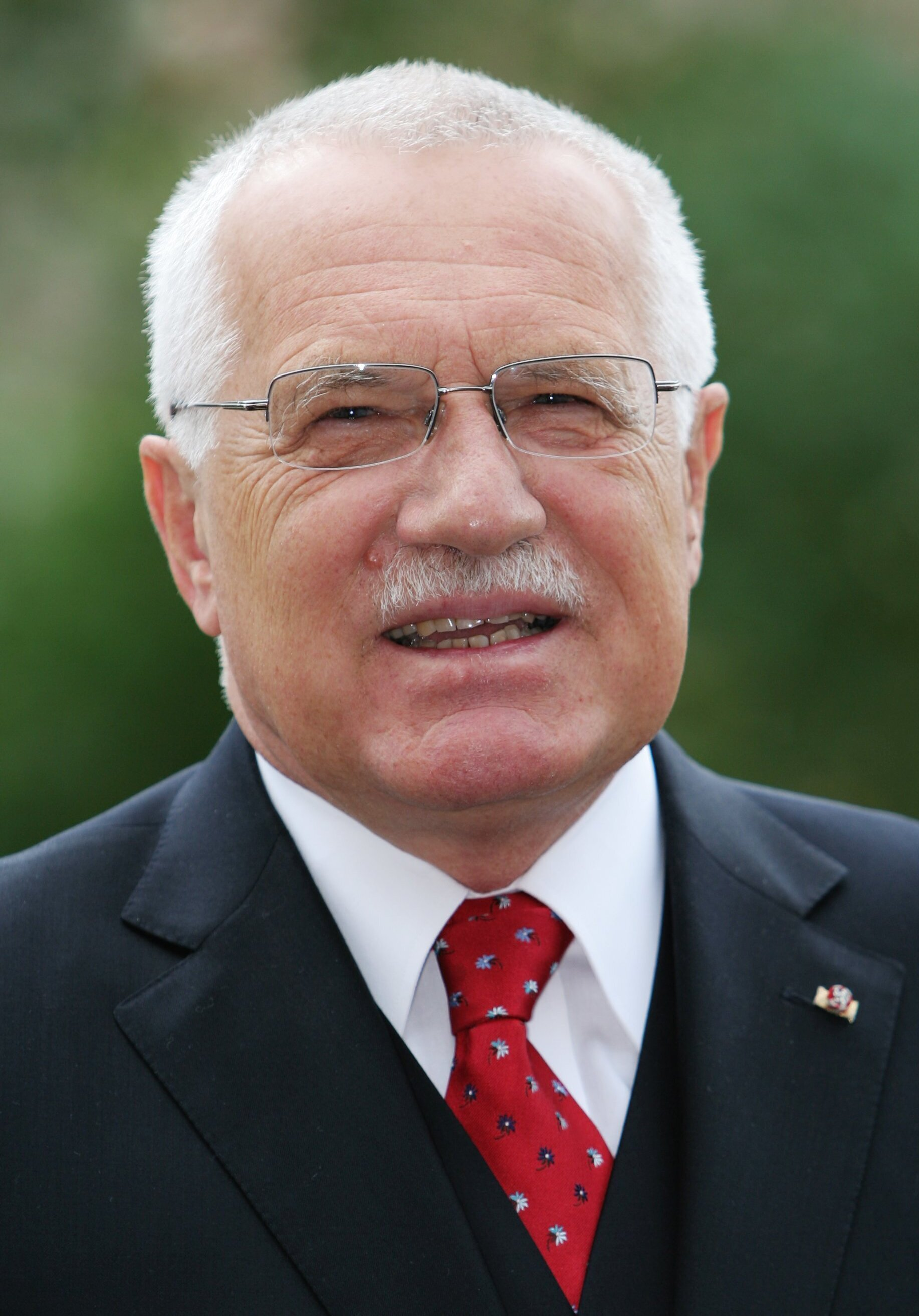

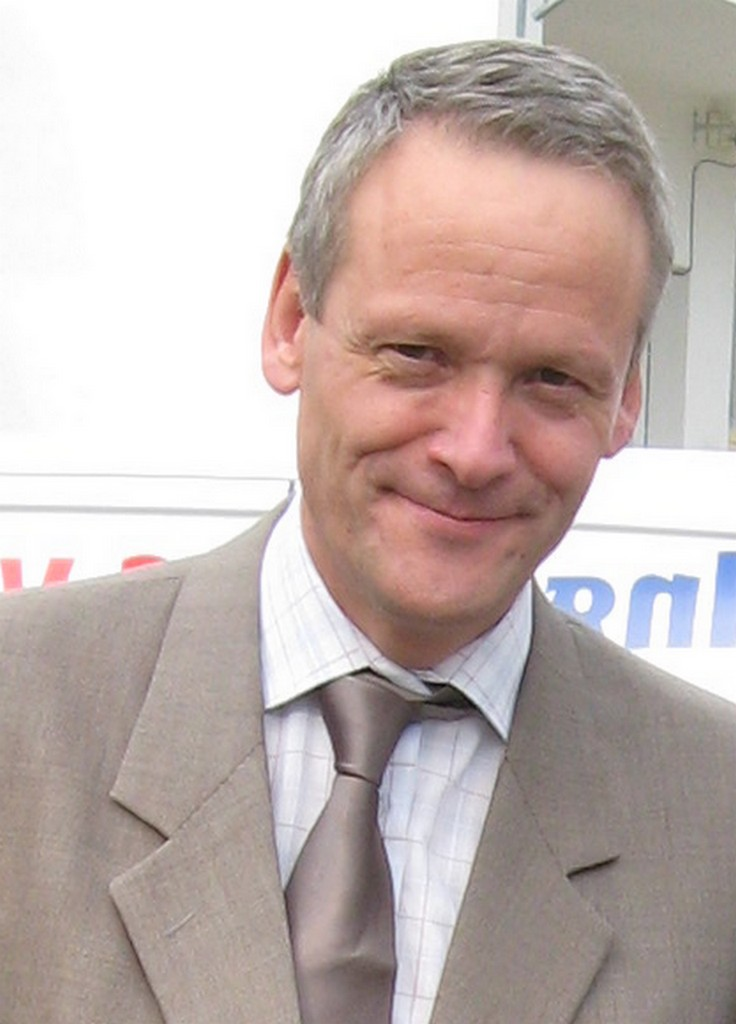

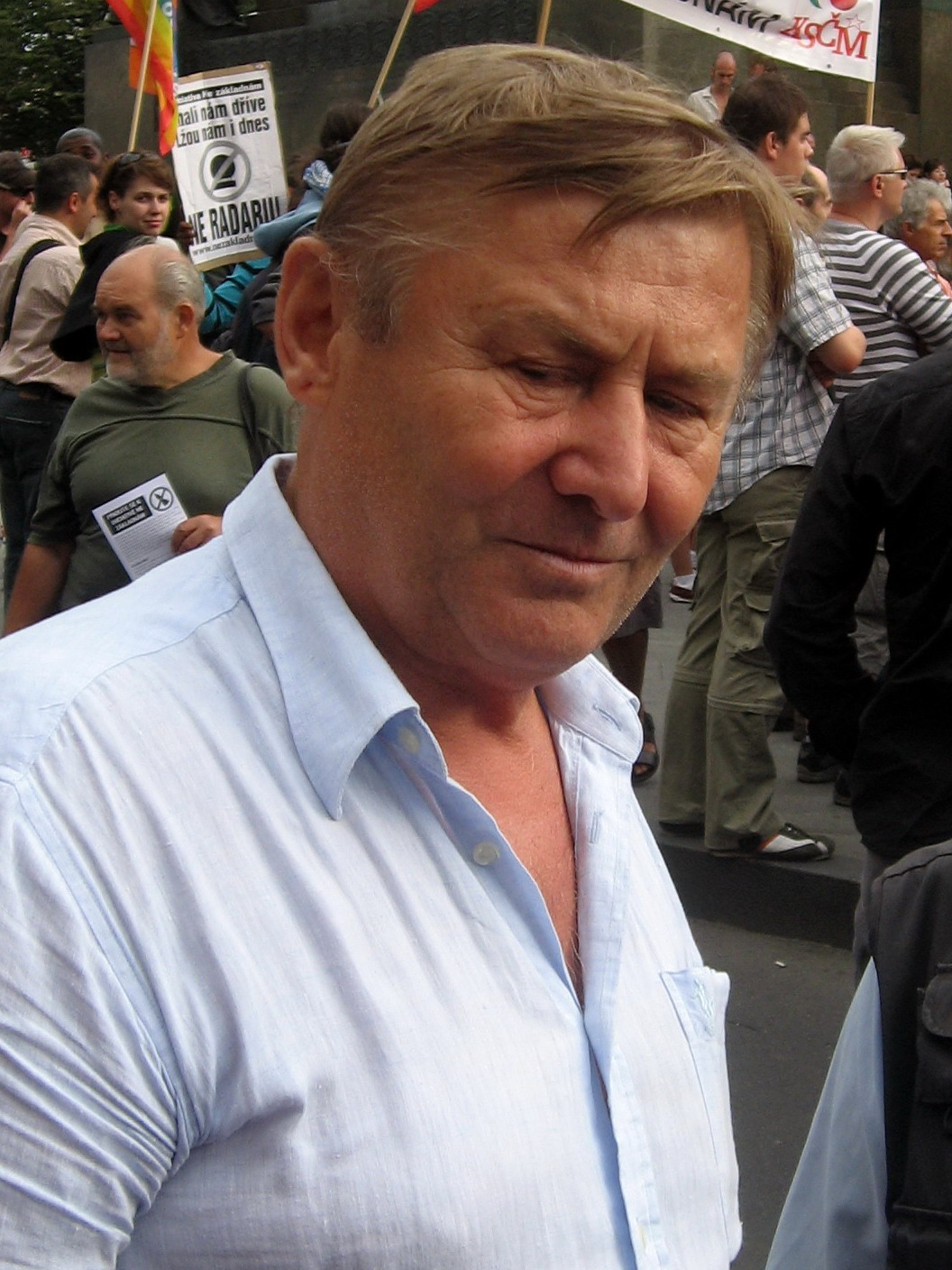

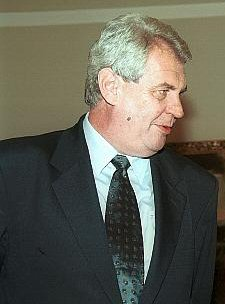
| | First party | Second party | Third party |
|---|---|---|---|
| Leader | Václav Klaus | Cyril Svoboda | Miroslav Grebeníček |
| Party | ODS | 4K | KSČM |
| Seats won | 185 | 175 | 161 |
| Popular vote | 559,301 | 537,012 | 496,688 |
| Percentage | 23.8% | 22.9 | 21.1% |
| | Fourth party |
| Leader | Miloš Zeman |
| Party | ČSSD |
| Seats won | 111 |
| Popular vote | 344,441 |
| Percentage | 14.7% |
Elected Chairman of Regional Association
Evžen Tošenovský
ODS

Regional elections were held in the Czech Republic to elect the Regional Councils of 13 regions (all except Prague) on 12 November 2000. Voter turnout was only 33.6%. The elections were won by the Civic Democratic Party, with Four-Coalition coming second and the ruling Czech Social Democratic Party in fourth.

== Opinion polls ==
| Date | Polling Firm | ODS | 4K | ČSSD | KSČM | Others |
|---|---|---|---|---|---|---|
| 1–6 November 2000 | SC&C and STEM | 18.7 | 17.3 | 15.8 | 14.0 | |

== Results ==
| Party | Votes | % | Seats |
|---|---|---|---|
| Civic Democratic Party | 559,301 | 23.8 | 185 |
| Four-Coalition | 537,012 | 22.9 | 175 |
| Communist Party of Bohemia and Moravia | 496,688 | 21.1 | 161 |
| Czech Social Democratic Party | 344,441 | 14.7 | 111 |
| SNK Union of Independents | 53,150 | 2.26 | 16 |
| Party for the Open Society | 12,539 | 0.5 | 5 |
| Independents | 63,085 | 2.7 | 13 |
