= 2010 Czech municipal elections =

- 15–16 October 2010

All 62,178 seats in municipal councils
- Turnout: 48.50%
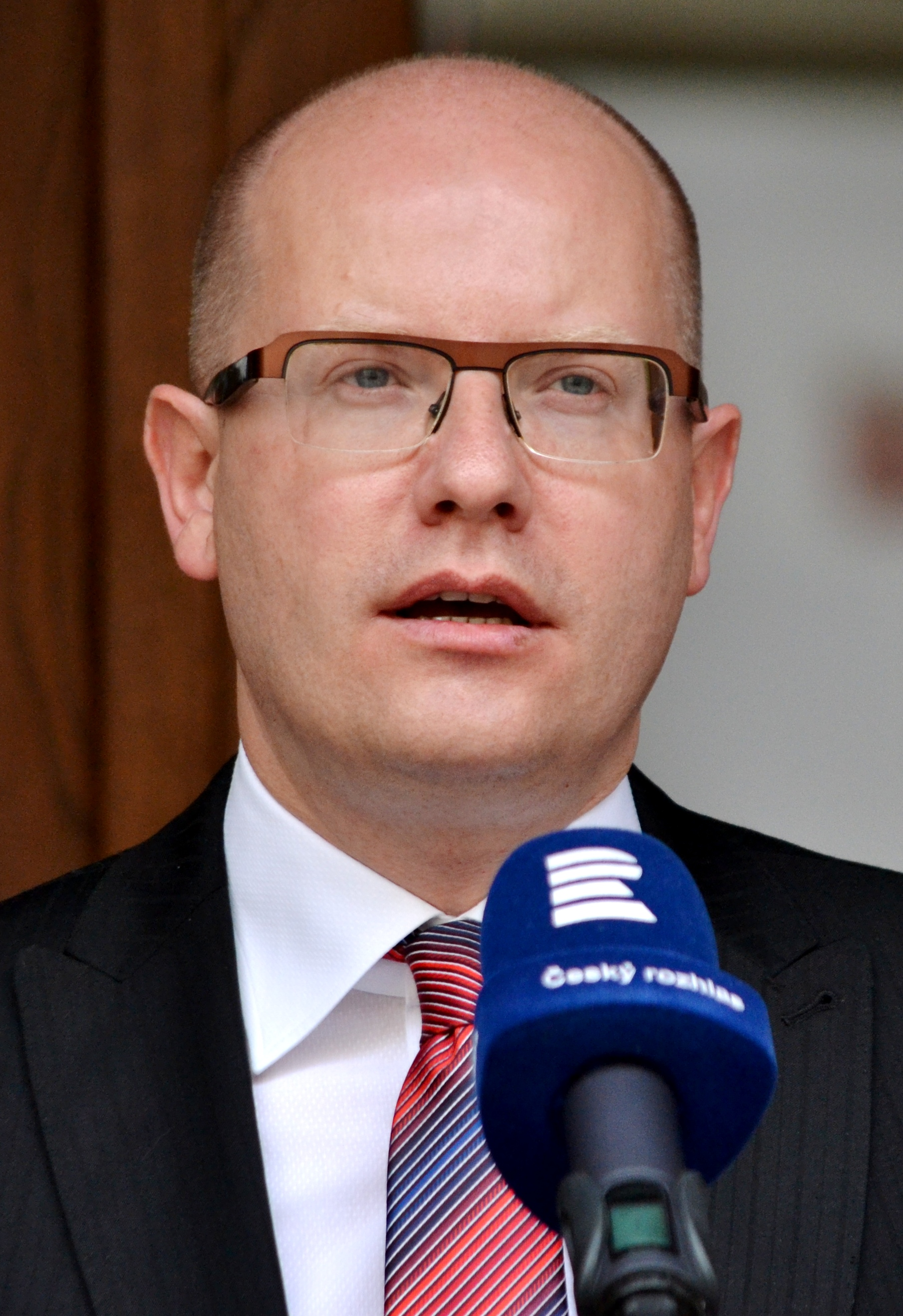

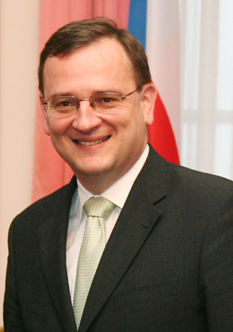

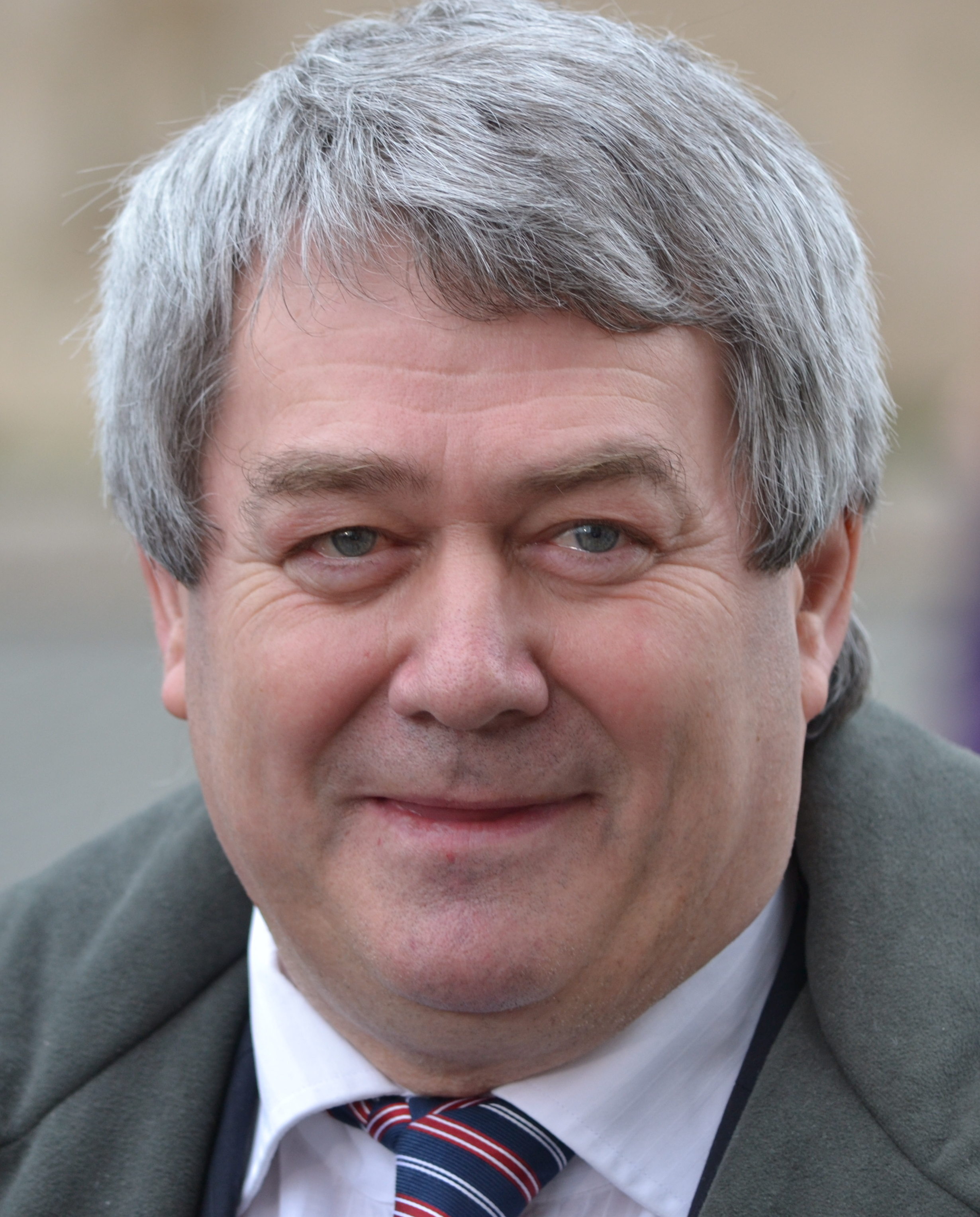

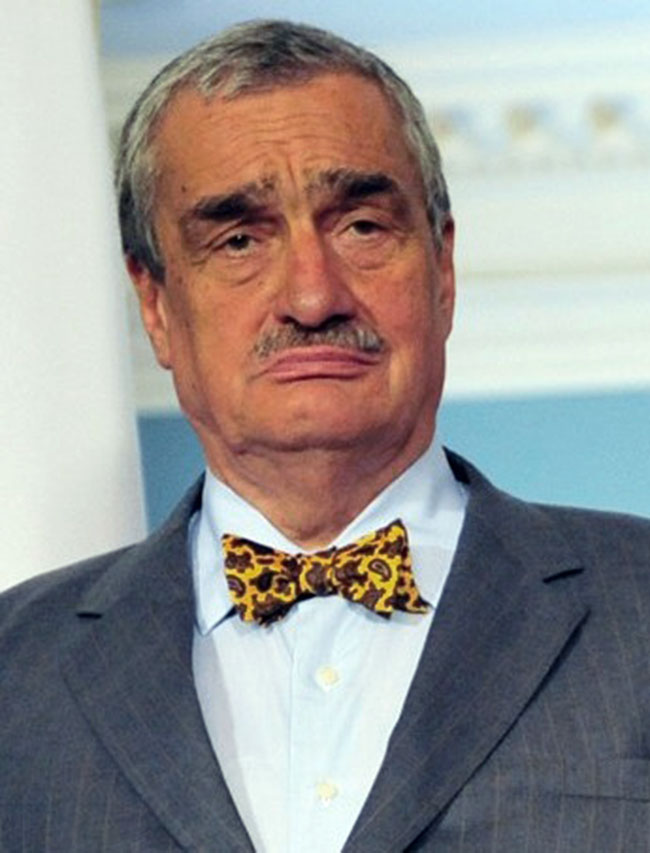

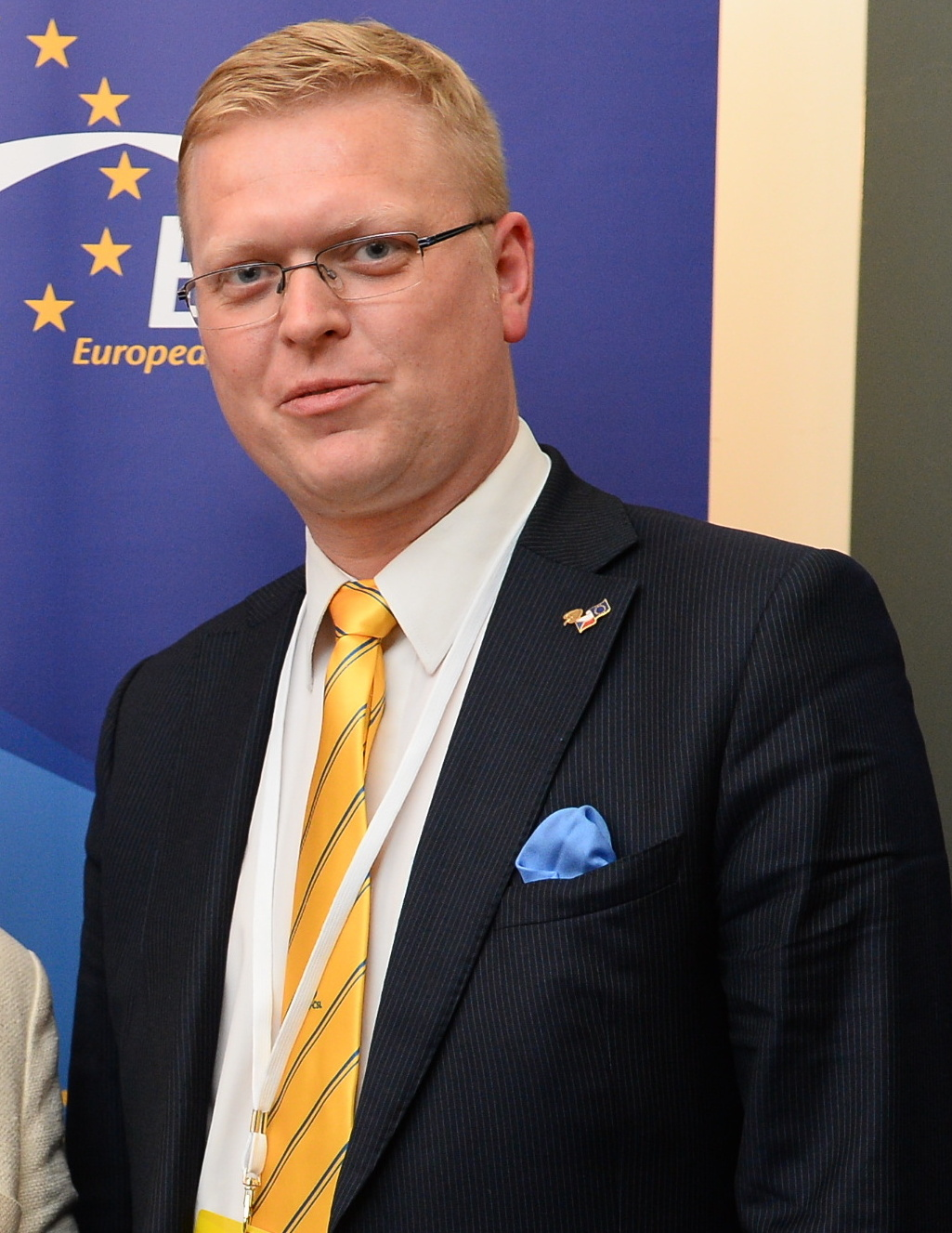

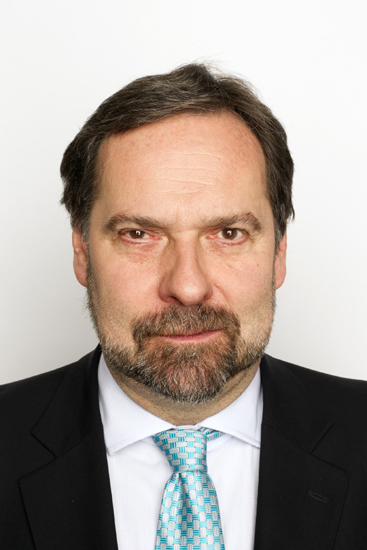
	First party	Second party	Third party
Leader	Bohuslav Sobotka	Petr Nečas	Vojtěch Filip
Party	ČSSD	ODS	KSČM
Seats won	4,584	5,1112	3,189
Popular vote	17,763,358	16,943,967	8,628,685
Percentage	19.7%	18.8%	9.6%
	Fourth party	Fifth party	Sixth party
Leader	Karel Schwarzenberg	Pavel Bělobrádek	Radek John
Party	TOP 09	KDU-ČSL	VV
Seats won	1.509	3,738	304
Popular vote	8,537,461	4,938,960	2,640,305
Percentage	9.5%	5.5%	2.9%

Municipal elections were held in the Czech Republic on 15 and 16 October. The Civic Democratic Party won the most seats, although it lost in Prague. The elections were a success for the Czech Social Democratic Party and TOP 09, and were considered a revival for the Christian and Democratic Union – Czechoslovak People's Party.

== Results ==
Party	Votes	%	Seats
Civic Democratic Party	16,943,967	18.78	5,112
Czech Social Democratic Party	17,763,358	19.68	4,584
Christian and Democratic Union – Czechoslovak People's Party	4,938,960	5.47	3,738
Communist Party of Bohemia and Moravia	8,628,685	9.56	3,189
TOP 09	8,537,461	9.46	1,509
Mayors and Independents	653,400	0.72	1,243
SNK European Democrats	770,543	0.85	551
Public Affairs	2,640,305	2.93	304
Green Party	1,491,212	1.65	156
Vote for the City	736,387	0.82	153
Party of Civic Rights	628,860	0.70	89
Party of Common Sense	673,856	0.75	61
Party of Free Citizens	673,856	0.22	29
Other parties	25,441,280	25.31	41,460
