= 2002 Czech municipal elections =

Municipal elections were held in the Czech Republic on 1 and 2 November 2002. The Civic Democratic Party received the most votes, although the Christian and Democratic Union – Czechoslovak People's Party won more seats.

== Results ==
Party	Votes	%	Seats
Civic Democratic Party	20,360,211	25.23	5,729
Czech Social Democratic Party	12,575,626	15.58	4,666
Communist Party of Bohemia and Moravia	11 696 976	14.49	5,702
Christian and Democratic Union – Czechoslovak People's Party	7,728,402	9.58	6,013
Freedom Union – Democratic Union	2,648,568	3.28	452
