= 1998 Czech municipal elections =

Municipal elections were held in the Czech Republic on 13 and 14 November 1998. A total of 62,412 seats were up for election, of which more than 30,000 were won by independent candidates- Voter turnout was 45.02%.

== Results ==
Party	Votes	%	Seats
Civic Democratic Party	18,959,841	24.17	5,700
Czech Social Democratic Party	13,671,868	17.43	4,250
Communist Party of Bohemia and Moravia	10,703,975	13.65	5,748
Christian and Democratic Union – Czechoslovak People's Party	8,393,460	10.70	7,119
Freedom Union – Democratic Union	4,297,272	5.48	701
