= 2002 Prague municipal election =

← 1998	20–21 October 2002	2006 →

All 70 seats in the Assembly 36 seats needed for a majority
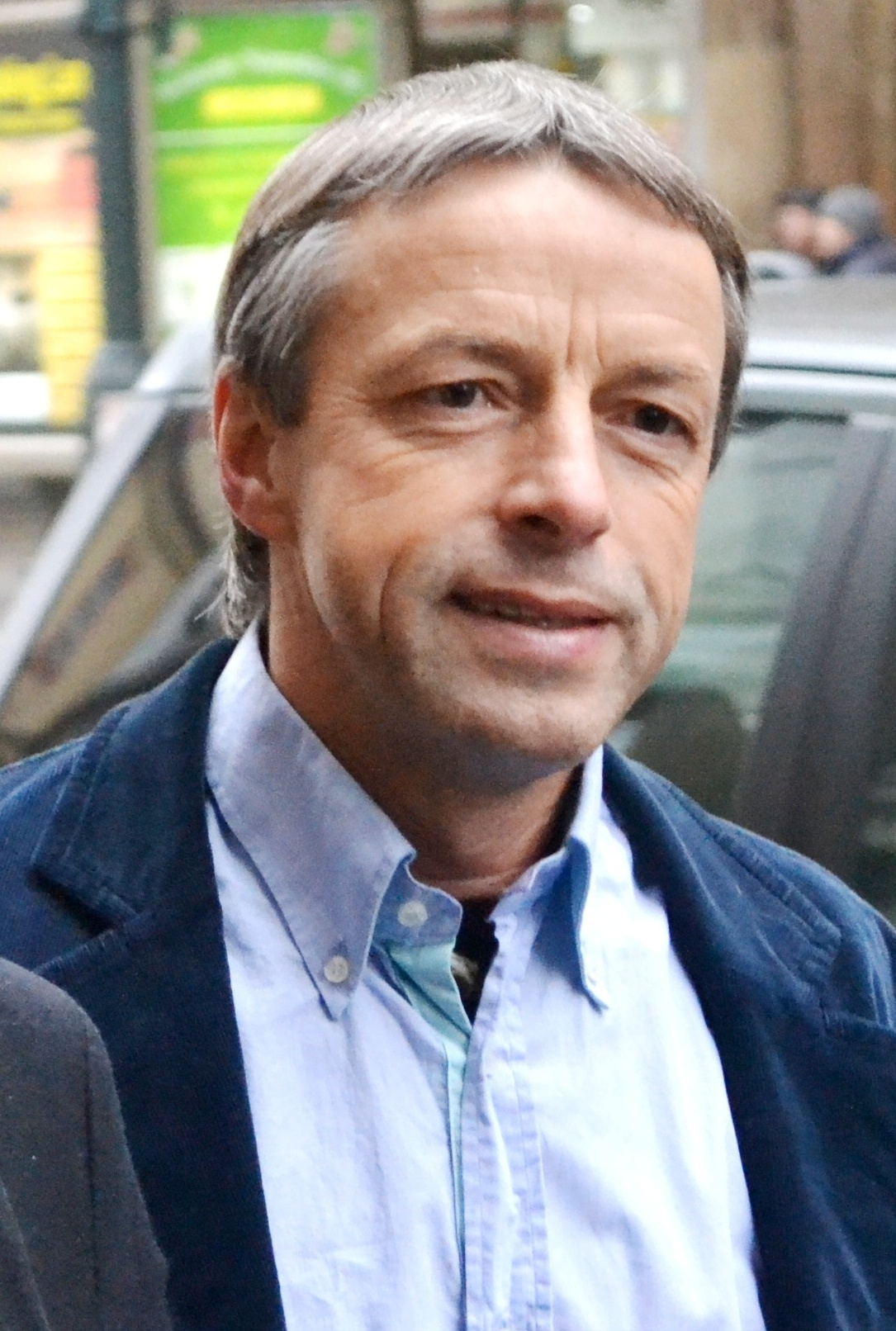

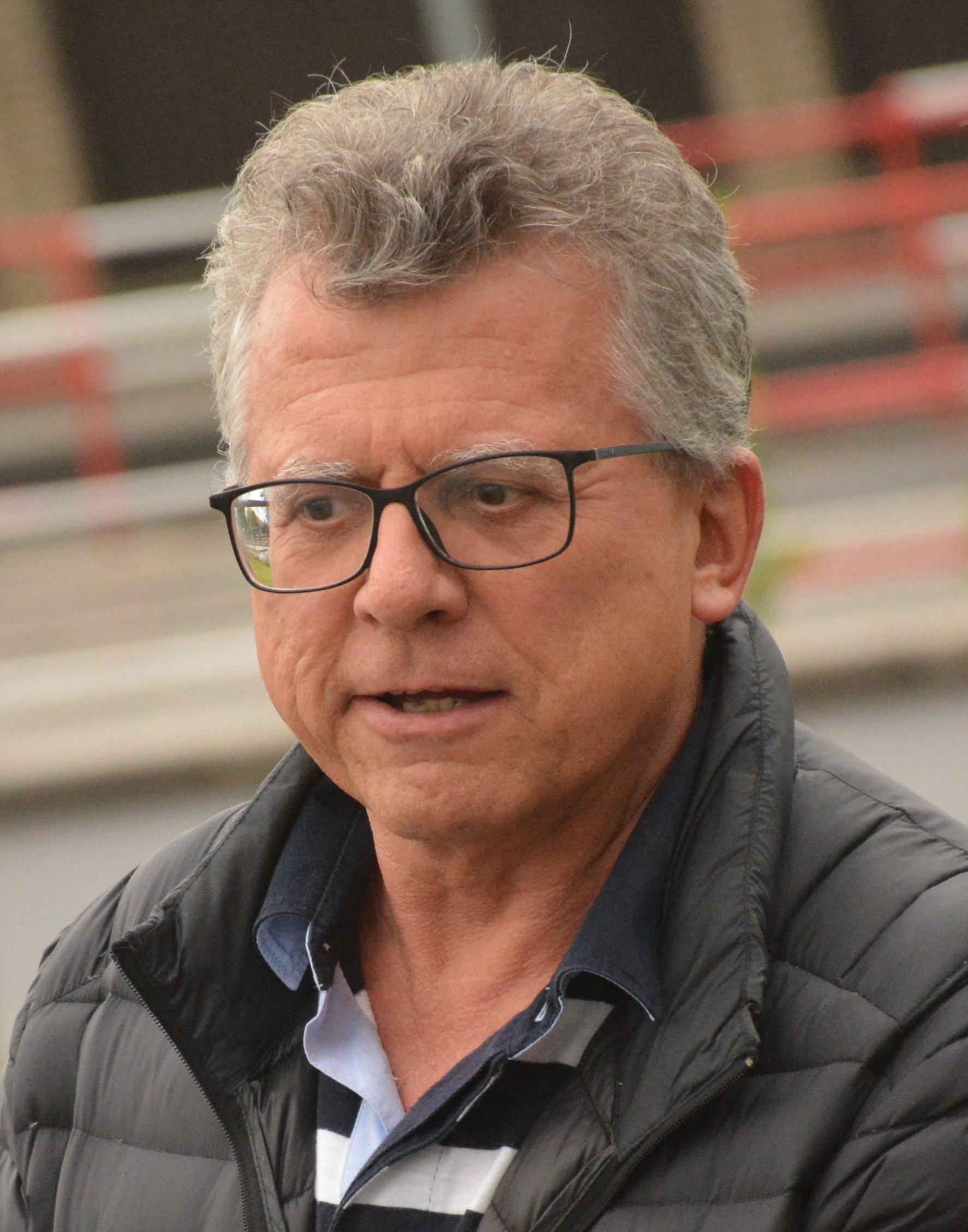

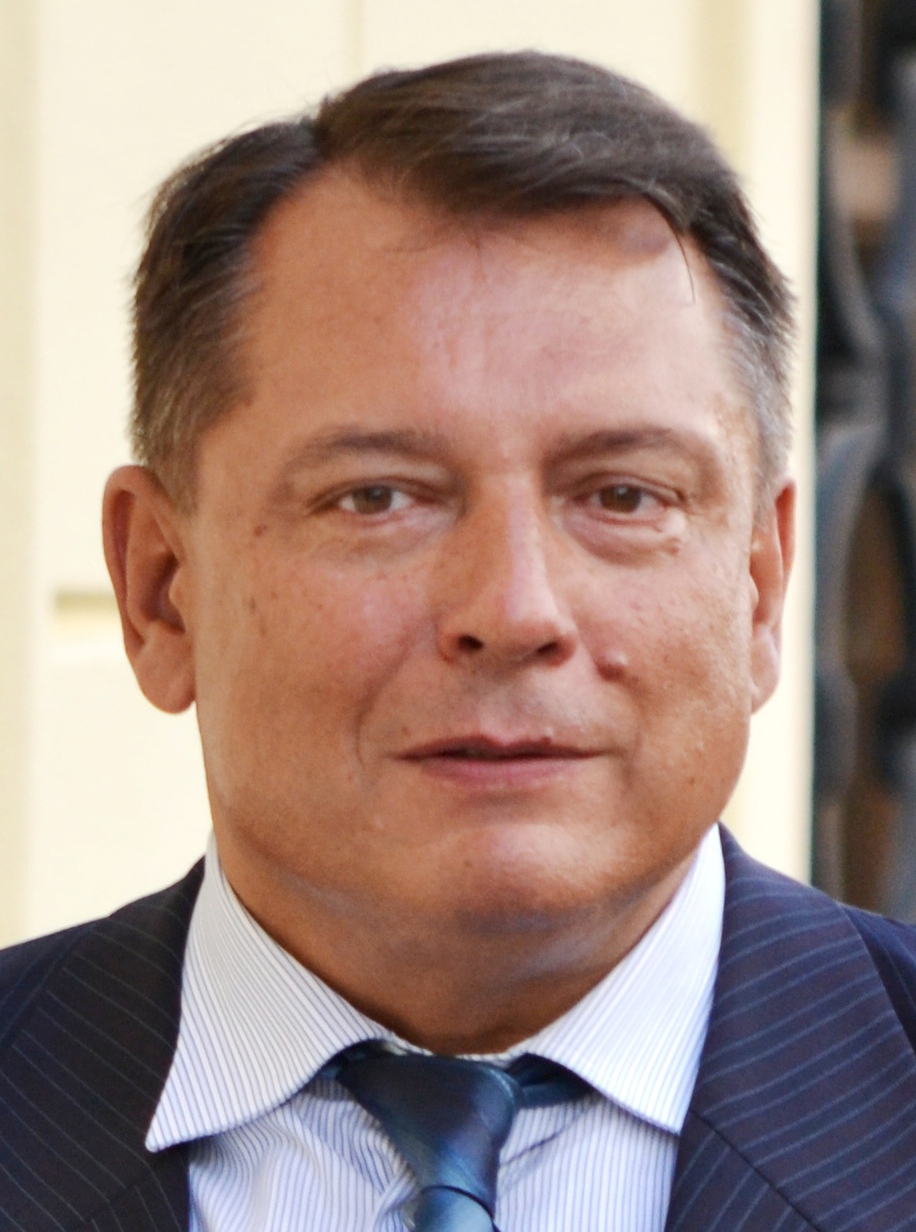
	First party	Second party	Third party
Leader	Pavel Bém	Jan Kasl	Jiří Paroubek
Party	ODS	ED	ČSSD
Seats won	30	15	12
Popular vote	1,592,119	822,894	656,936
Percentage	35.5%	18.4%	14.7%
Mayor before election
Igor Němec
ODS
Elected mayor
Pavel Bém
ODS

The 2002 Prague municipal election was held as part of 2002 Czech municipal elections. It was held on 1 and 2 November 2002. Civic Democratic Party has won the election and Pavel Bém became the Mayor of Prague.

== Background ==
Civic Democratic Party (ODS) won 1998 municipal election in Prague and Jan Kasl became the mayor. He resigned on the position in May 2002 after conflicts with his colleagues in the party. He left ODS and formed new party called European Democrats. Igor Němec replaced Kasl as the Mayor of Prague.

=== Campaign ===
Pavel Bém became Civic Democratic Party candidate for Mayor. Czech Social Democratic Party (ČSSD) was led by Jiří Paroubek. Freedom Union was led by Michael Hvížďala. European Democrats were led by Jan Kasl.

Campaign started in October 2002. Parties filled the city with billboards. ODS focused on safety. Freedom Union promised easily available housing. ČSSD promised "City for Living." Leader of ČSSD Paroubek held many meeting with voters to be as visible as possible.

== Results ==
Party	Vote	%Vote	Seats
Civic Democratic Party	1,592,119	35.54%	30
European Democrats	822,894	18.37%	15
Czech Social Democratic Party	656,936	14.66%	12
Communist Party of Bohemia and Moravia	485,322	10.83%	8
Freedom Union	252,540	5.64%	2
Coalition of SNK, SZ and SOS	225,530	5.03%	2
Christian and Democratic Union – Czechoslovak People's Party	204,453	4.56%	1
independents for Prague	139,442	3.11%	0

Civic Democrats led by Pavel bém won the election. Bém then formed coalition with Czech Social Democratic Party and became the Mayor of Prague.
