= 1991 Czechoslovak Social Democracy leadership election =

1990 ČSSD leadership election
- 7 April 1991
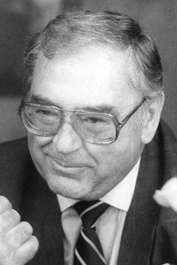

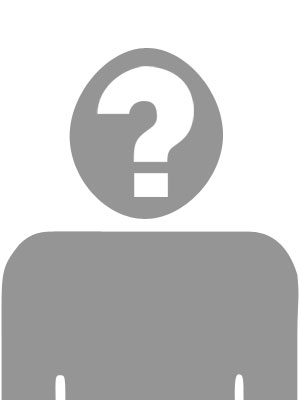
Candidate	Jiří Horák	Albert Černý
Electoral vote	260	98
Percentage	72.63%	27.37%
Leader of ČSSD before election
Jiří Horák
Elected Leader of ČSSD
Jiří Horák

A leadership election was held by the Czech Social Democratic Party (ČSSD) on 7 April 1991. Jiří Horák was reelected as party leader with 260 of the 358 votes, defeating Albert Černý.
