= 1990 Czechoslovak Social Democracy leadership election =

1990 ČSSD leadership election
- 25 March 1990
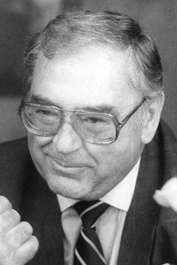

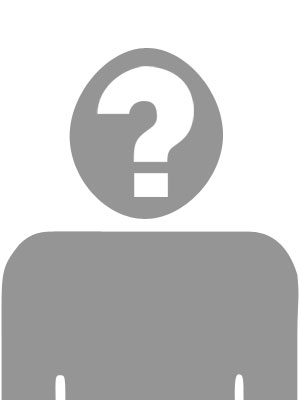
Nominee	Jiří Horák	Rudolf Battěk
Electoral vote	223	150
Percentage	59.8%	40.2%
Elected Leader of ČSSD
Jiří Horák

A leadership election was held within the Czech Social Democratic Party (ČSSD) on 25 March 1990. It was the first leadership election since the party's re-establishment and saw Jiří Horák defeat Rudolf Battěk. Battěk was supported by exiled politicians from the party, and wanted ČSSD to run in the 1990 parliamentary elections as part of the Civic Forum list, while Horák wanted the party to run independently.

== Results ==
Candidate	Vote	%
Jiří Horák	223	59.79
Rudolf Battěk	150	40.21

== Aftermath ==
Although Horák won, Battěk's wing of the party participated in 1990 elections on the Civic Forum list and won some seats. The ČSSD received only 4% of the vote and failed to cross the electoral threshold. Horák blamed Battěk's wing for the failure and Battěk and his supporters were expelled from the party.
