= 1993 Czech Social Democratic Party leadership election =

Leadership election for the Czech Social Democratic Party held in 1993

1993 ČSSD leadership election
- 28 February 1993
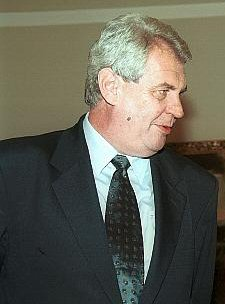

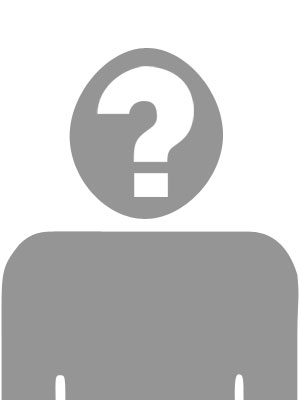
Nominee	Miloš Zeman	Pavel Novák
Electoral vote	212	163
Percentage	56.5%	43.5%
Leader of ČSSD before election
Jiří Horák
Elected Leader of ČSSD
Miloš Zeman

An election for the leadership of the Czech Social Democratic Party (ČSSD) was held on 28 February 1993. Miloš Zeman was elected new leader of ČSSD. Zeman defeated Jiří Paroubek, Petr Miller and Pavel Novák who was endorsed by incumbent leader Jiří Horák. Zeman and Paroubek qualified but Paroubek dropped out of the election and Pavel Novák took his place in the second round.

Jiří Paroubek represented so-called "Rakovník wing" in ČSSD that supported centrist orientation of the party. Zeman was more left-wing candidate. Zeman's wing was more radical against ODS. The third wing was called Centrist and its stances were somewhere between the other two wings. It was represented by Pavel Novák. Petr Miller was not part of any wing and his support was minimal. 407 delegates were allowed to vote. Candidate needed to gain at least 204 votes to win.

== Results ==
Candidate	Preliminary		First round		Second round	
Candidate	Votes	%	Votes	%	Votes	%
Miloš Zeman	179	46.37	197	54.72	212	56.53
Jiří Paroubek	101	26.17				
Pavel Novák	99	25.65	163	45.28	163	43.47
Petr Miller	7	1.81				
Total	386	100	360	100	375	100
