= 1994 Prague municipal election =

- 18–19 November 1994

All 55 seats in the Assembly 28 seats needed for a majority
- Turnout: 53.73%
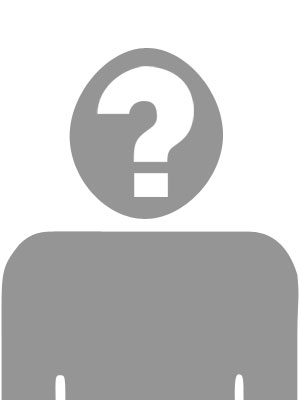

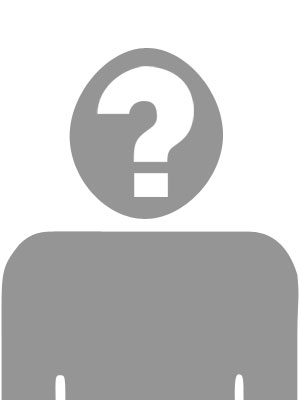

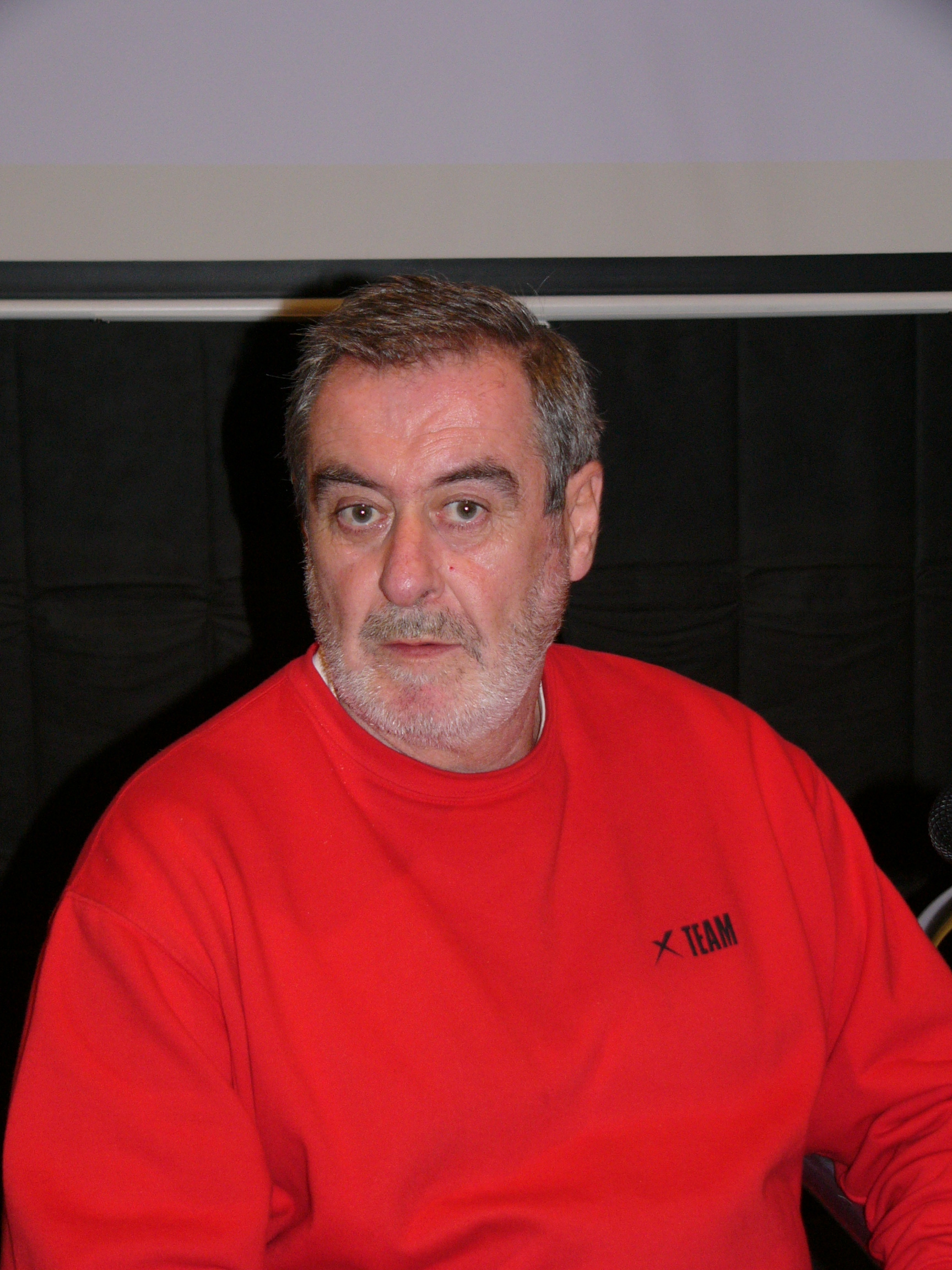

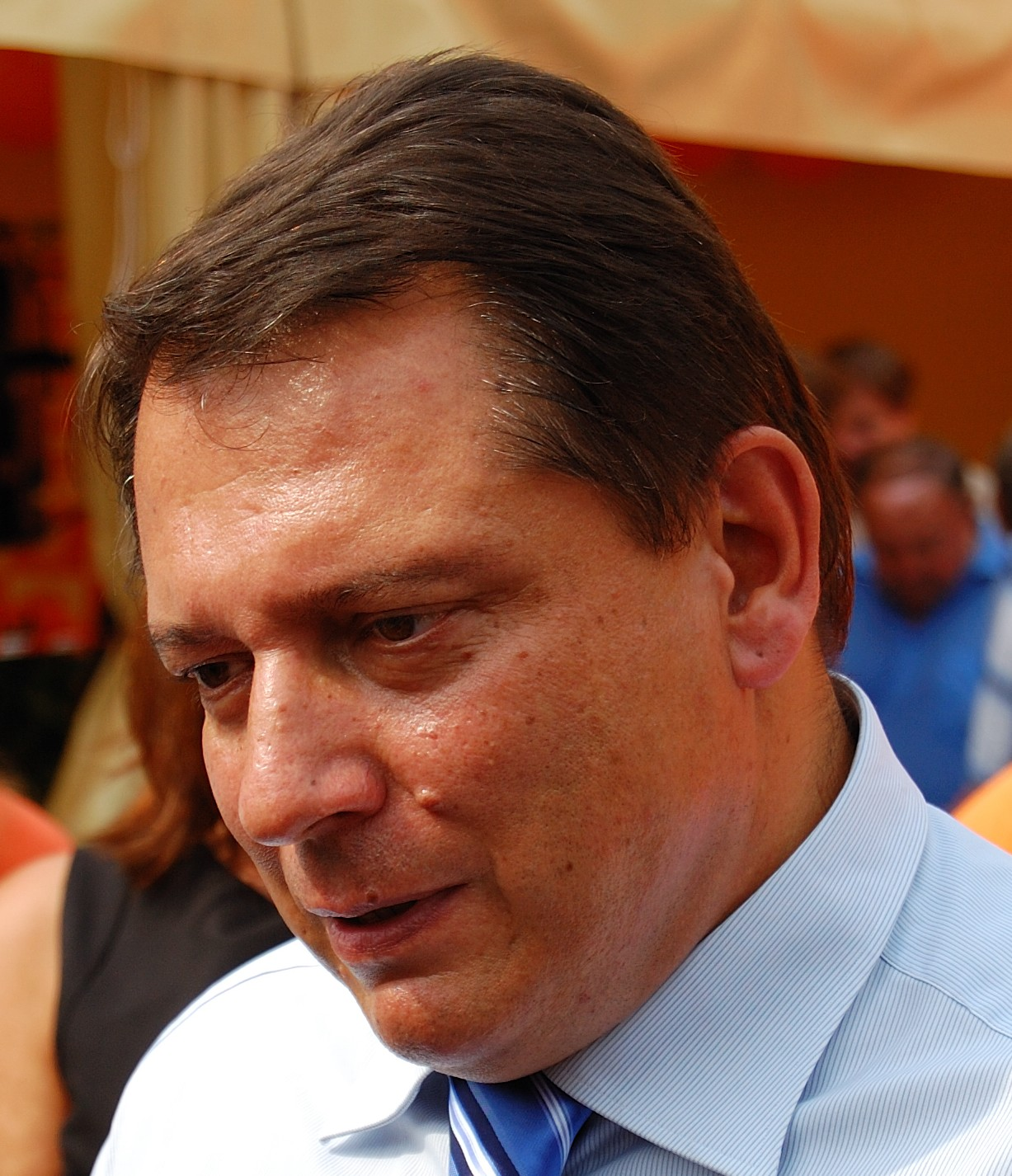

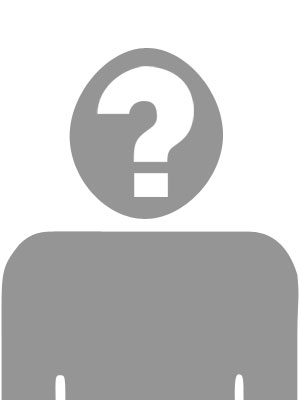

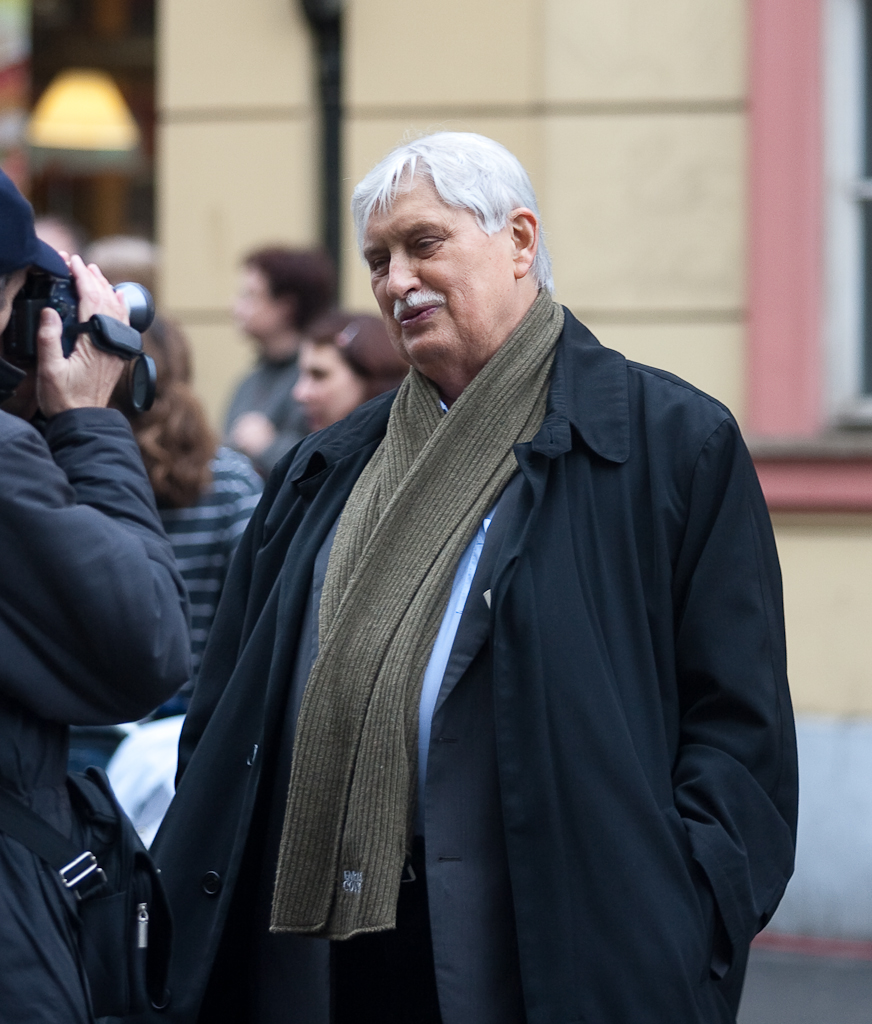
	First party	Second party	Third party
Leader	Jan Koukal	Petr Zajíček	Michal Prokop
Party	ODS	KSČM	ODA
Seats won	23	6	5
Popular vote	11,658,227	3,022,628	2,669,620
Percentage	41.2%	10.7%	9.4%
	Fourth party	Fifth party	Sixth party
Leader	Jiří Paroubek	Karel Berka	Jiří Dienstbier
Party	ČSSD	DEU	OH
Seats won	5	3	3
Popular vote	2,435,279	1,460,532	1,377,633
Percentage	8.6%	5.2%	4.9%
Mayor before election
Jan Koukal
ODS
Elected mayor
Jan Koukal
ODS

The 1994 Prague municipal election was held as part of 1994 Czech municipal elections. It was the first that Prague consisted only one electoral district.

== Campaign ==
ODS was led by Jan Koukal. Koukal became Mayor of Prague in 1993 when he replaced Milan Kondr. Koukal had an image of strong and decisive leader. The campaign focused on his positive personal qualities. Other parties tried to imitate this tactics.

== Results ==
Party	Vote	%Vote	Seats
Civic Democratic Party	11,658,227	41.16%	23
Communist Party of Bohemia and Moravia	3,022,628	10.67%	6
Civic Democratic Alliance	2,669,620	9.42%	5
Czech Social Democratic Party	2,435,279	8.60%	5
Democratic Union	1,460,532	5.16%	3
Free Democrats (OH)	1,377,633	4.86%	3
Pensioners for Life Security	1,019,305	3.60%	2
Christian and Democratic Union – Czechoslovak People's Party	763,782	2.70%	1
Coalition for Republic – Republican Party of Czechoslovakia	562,735	1.99%	1
Association of Independents of Prague	562,735	1.99%	1
Citizens of Prague for Prague	536,111	1.89%	1
Green Party	488,323	1.72%	1
Independent Initiative	452,185	1.60%	1
Christian Democratic Party	266,778	0.94%	1
Club of Committed Non-Party Members	260,946	0.92%	1
Others			0

ODS won an overwhelming victory and a formed coalition with the Civic Democratic Alliance.
