= 1998 Prague municipal election =

- 18–14 November 1998

All 55 seats in the Assembly 28 seats needed for a majority
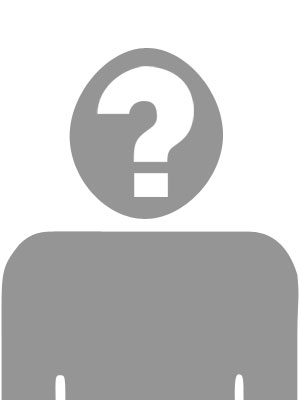

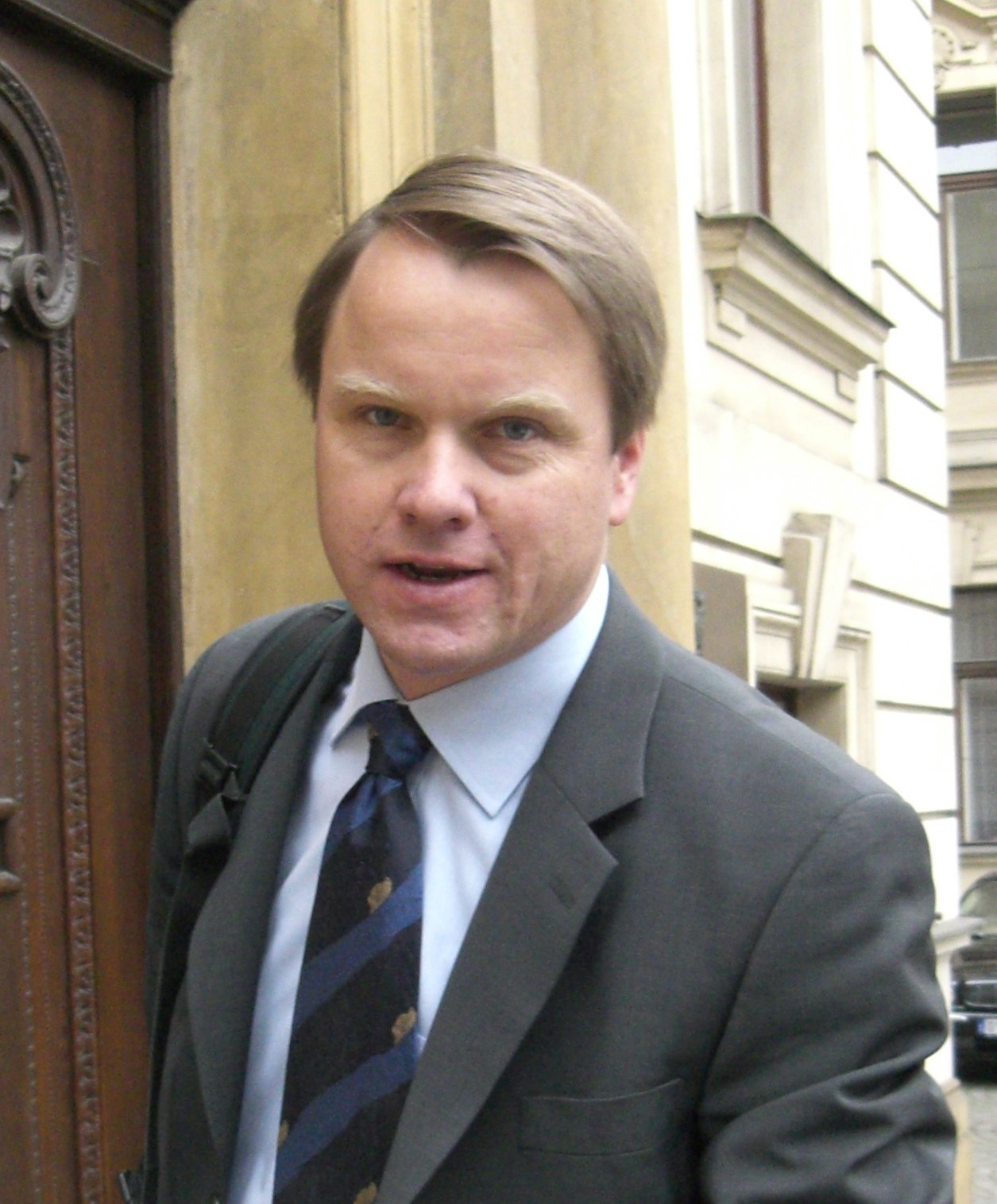
	First party	Second party
Leader	Jan Koukal	Martin Bursík
Party	ODS	UPP
Seats won	21	16
Popular vote	765,777	582,867
Percentage	36.8%	28.1%
Mayor before election
Jan Koukal
ODS
Elected mayor
Jan Kasl
ODS

The 1998 Prague municipal election was held as part of 1998 Czech municipal elections. Civic Democratic Party has received highest number of votes and formed coalition with Czech Social Democratic Party. Jan Kasl became mayor of Prague.

== Campaign ==
The Civic Democratic Party was led by Mayor Jan Koukal. Party's main rival was Union for Prague (UPP) led by Martin Bursík. UPP ran on anti-corruption platform and was attacking Koukal's management of the city. Bursík was attacking Koukal during campaign.

== Results ==
Party	Vote	%Vote	Seats
Civic Democratic Party	765,777	36.88%	21
Union for Prague	582,867	28.07%	16
Czech Social Democratic Party	363,917	17.53%	10
Communist Party of Bohemia and Moravia	207,977	10.02%	8
Association of ČSNS, SZ, KAN, D92, MDS, NEZ, PB, OK	56,066	2.70%	0
Prague People for Prague	33,095	1.59%	0
Initiative for Prague Citizens	21,736	1.05%	0

== Aftermath ==
ODS has won the election while UPP was second. Bursík refused coalition with ODS if Koukal leads it. Bursík sought support of ČSSD and KSČM, but Koukal decided to not seek position of Mayor and instead let ODS nominate Jan Kasl. ODS then formed coalition with ČSSD.
