= 2010 Prague municipal election =

← 2006	15–16 October 2010	2014 →

All 63 seats in the Assembly 32 seats needed for a majority
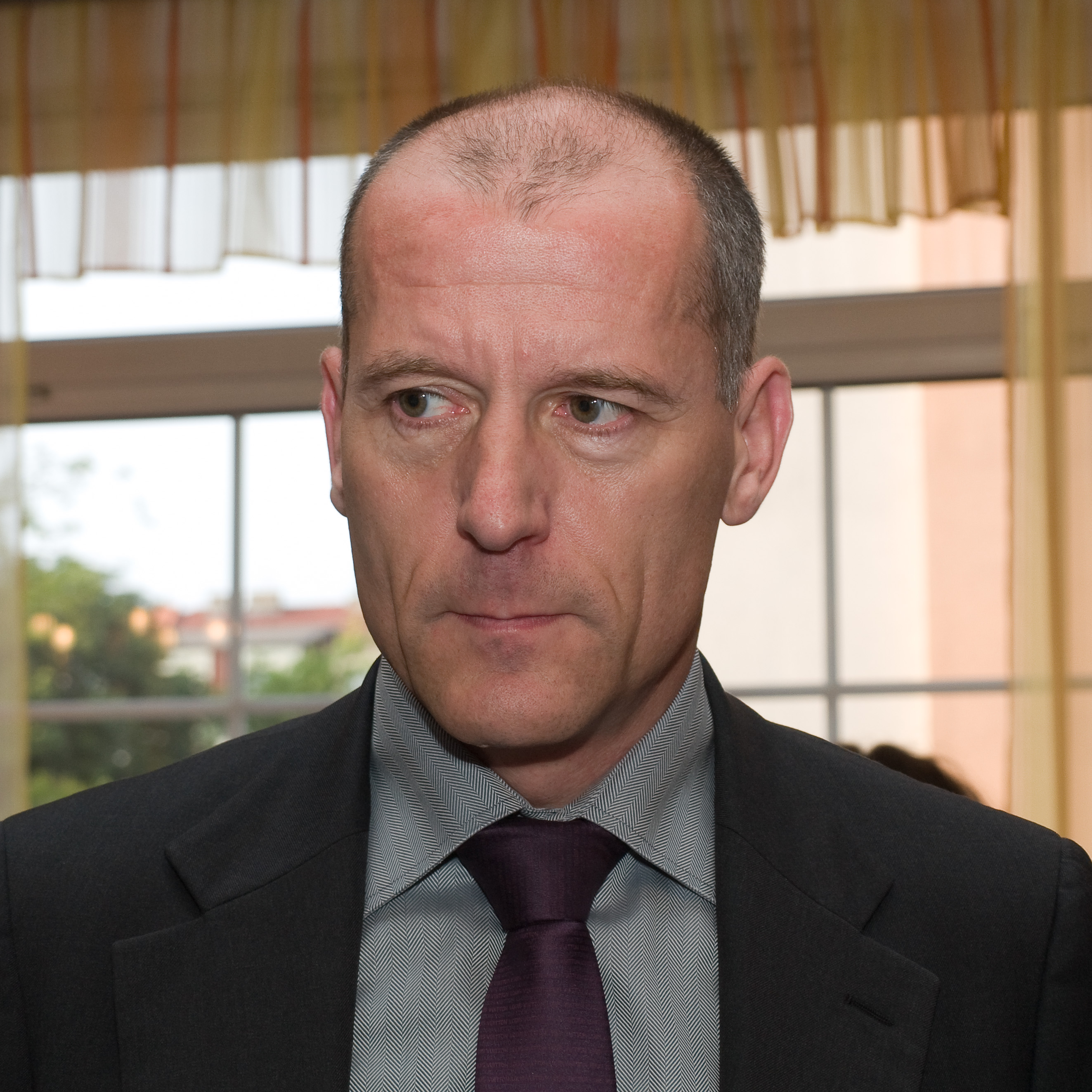

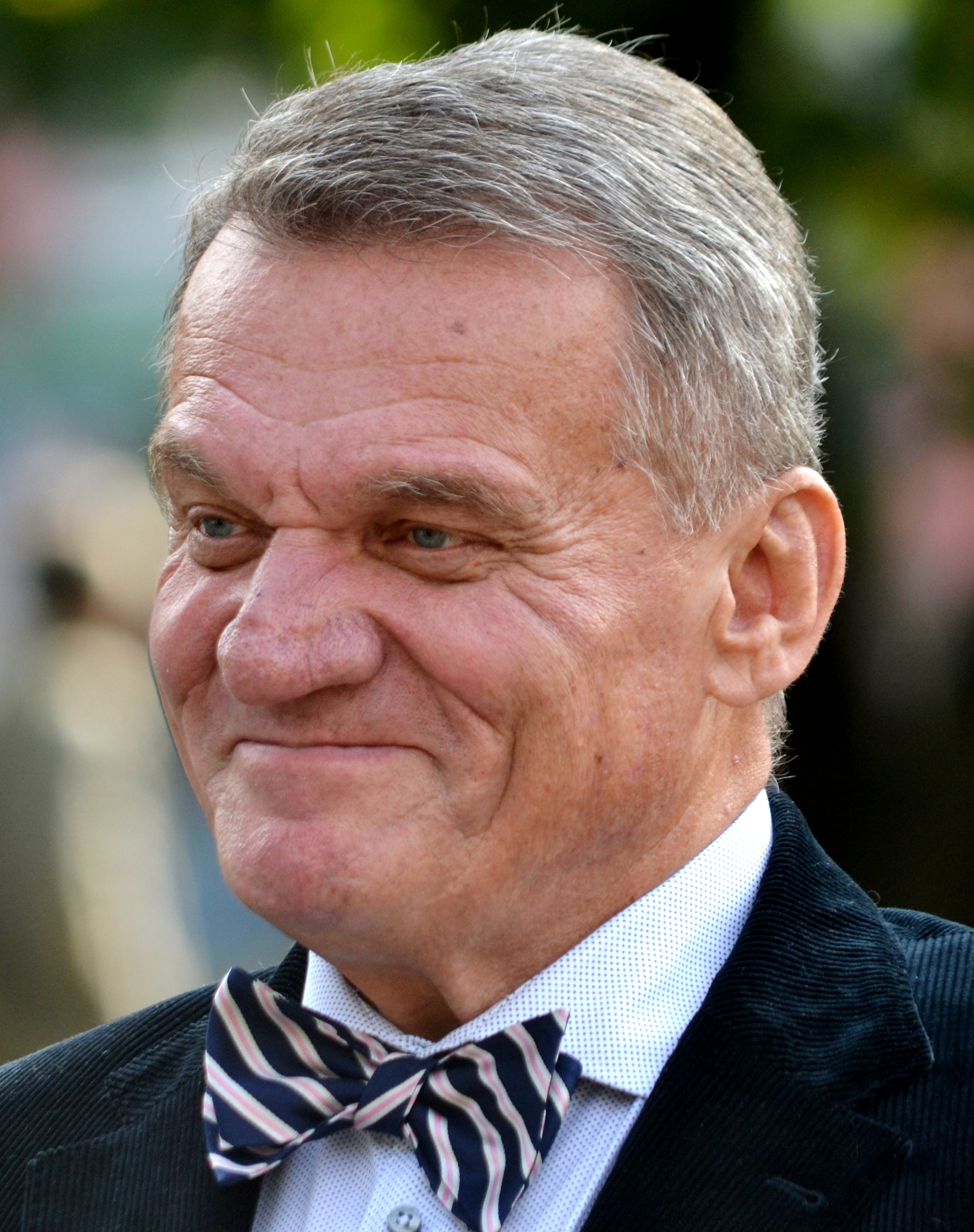

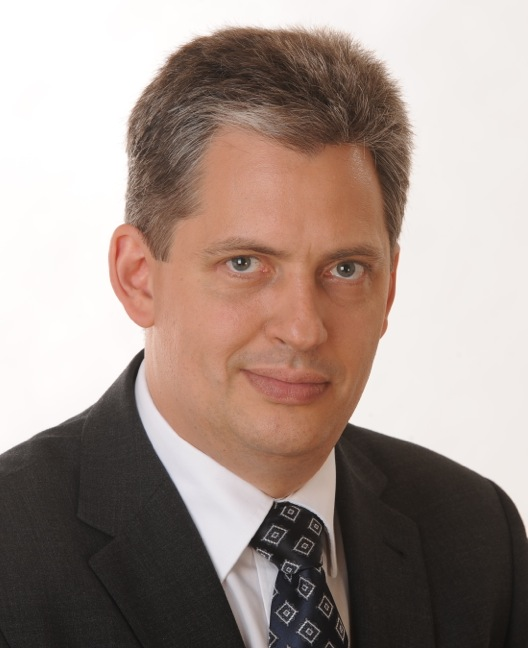
	First party	Second party	Third party
Leader	Zdeněk Tůma	Bohuslav Svoboda	Jiří Dienstbier Jr.
Party	TOP 09	ODS	ČSSD
Seats won	26	20	19
Popular vote	1,043,008	796,218	615,209
Percentage	30.2%	21.1%	17.9%
Mayor before election
Pavel Bém
ODS
Elected mayor
Bohuslav Svoboda
ODS

The 2010 Prague municipal election was held as part of 2010 Czech municipal elections. It was held on 15 and 16 October 2010. Prague was divided into 7 electoral districts with 9 mandates allocated for each district. It created a "natural threshold."

Election was won by TOP 09 ahead of Civic Democratic Party. Czech Social Democratic Party came third. Civic Democrats then formed coalition with Social Democrats and Bohuslav Svoboda became Mayor of Prague.

== Opinion polling ==
Published	Company	TOP 09	ODS	ČSSD	VV	KSČM	SZ	KDU-ČSL	others
15-16 October 2010	Election	30.2	21.1	17.9	5.7	6.8	5.9	1.9	
11 October 2010	Factum Invenio	29.0	24.0						
5 October 2010	Global PR	25.0	18.0	15.0	12.0	6.0	2.0	1.0	
5 October 2010	SC&C	25.0	28.0	15.0	8.0	9.0	4.0		
15 September 2010	SANEP	28.1	22.2	16.4	12.2				
25 July 2010	SANEP	24.1	23.2	14.8	10.9	6.3	2.2	14.6	N/A
22 January 2010	STEM/MARK	27.5	27.0	14.8	N/A	5.6			

== Results ==
Party	Vote	%Vote	Seats
TOP 09	1,043,008	30.26	26
Civic Democratic Party	796,218	21.10	20
Czech Social Democratic Party	615,209	17.85	14
Communist Party of Bohemia and Moravia	235,004	6.82	3
Green Party - SNK European Democrats	203,363	5.90	0
Public Affairs	195,158	5.66	0
Common Sense Party	84,282	2.45	0
Christian and Democratic Union – Czechoslovak People's Party	65,127	1.89	0
Party of Free Citizens	33,766	0.98	0
Czech Pirate Party	32,901	0.95	0
Others	142,845	4.14	0
