= Masaryk Democratic Academy =

Association in Czechia

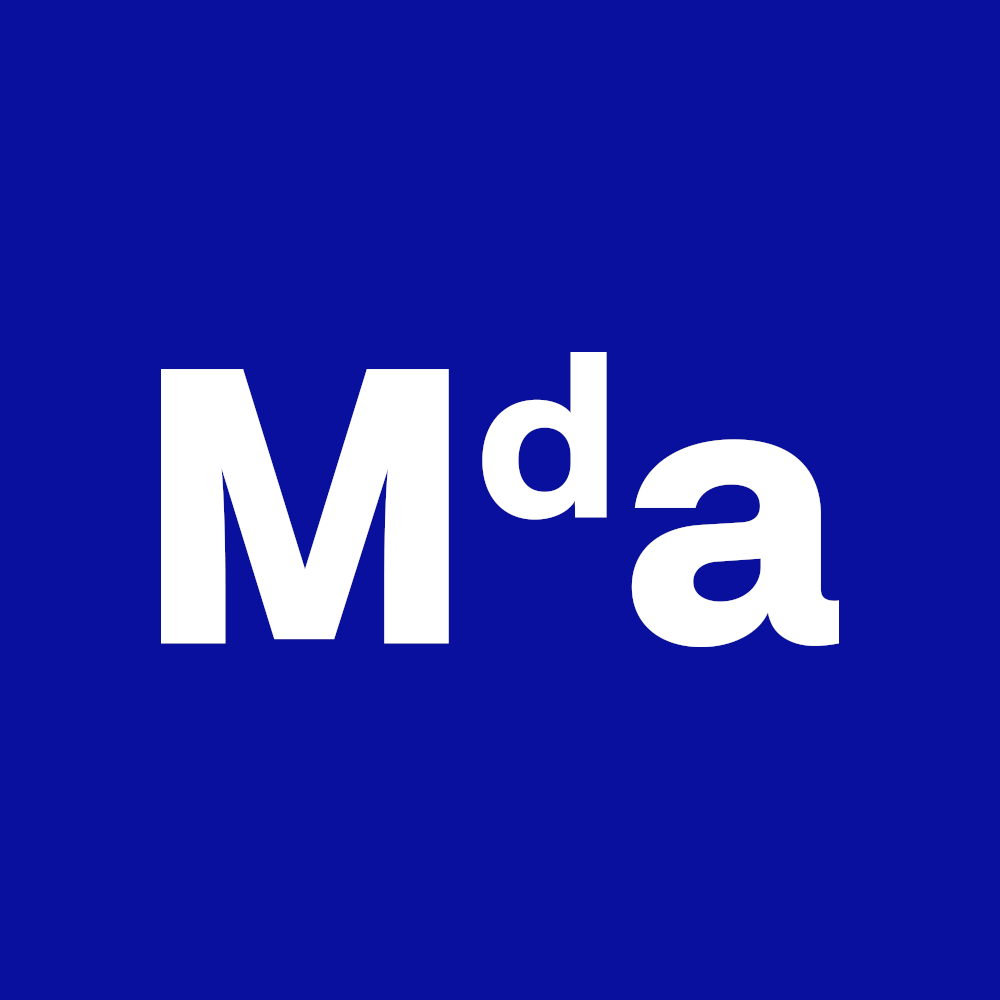
- Founded: 1896
- Founders: Josef Steiner & Tomáš Garrigue Masaryk
- Type: Association
- Purpose: Political education and transmission of Social democratic ideas to the public
- Location: Prague, Czech Republic
- Key people: Vladimír Špidla, Lubomír Zaorálek
- Website: http://www.masarykovaakademie.cz/ (in Czech)

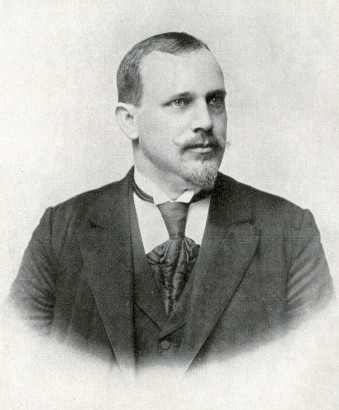
Josef Steiner

Masaryk Democratic Academy (Czech: Masarykova demokratická akademie, MDA) is a think-tank affiliated with the Social Democracy (SOCDEM). It was founded in 1896 by Josef Steiner and Tomáš Garrigue Masaryk as Masaryk Workers' Academy (Czech: Masarykova dělnická akademie, MDA). Masaryk Workers' Academy changed its name in 2009.
