= 2006 Prague municipal election =

← 2002	20–21 October 2006	2010 →

All 70 seats in the Assembly 36 seats needed for a majority
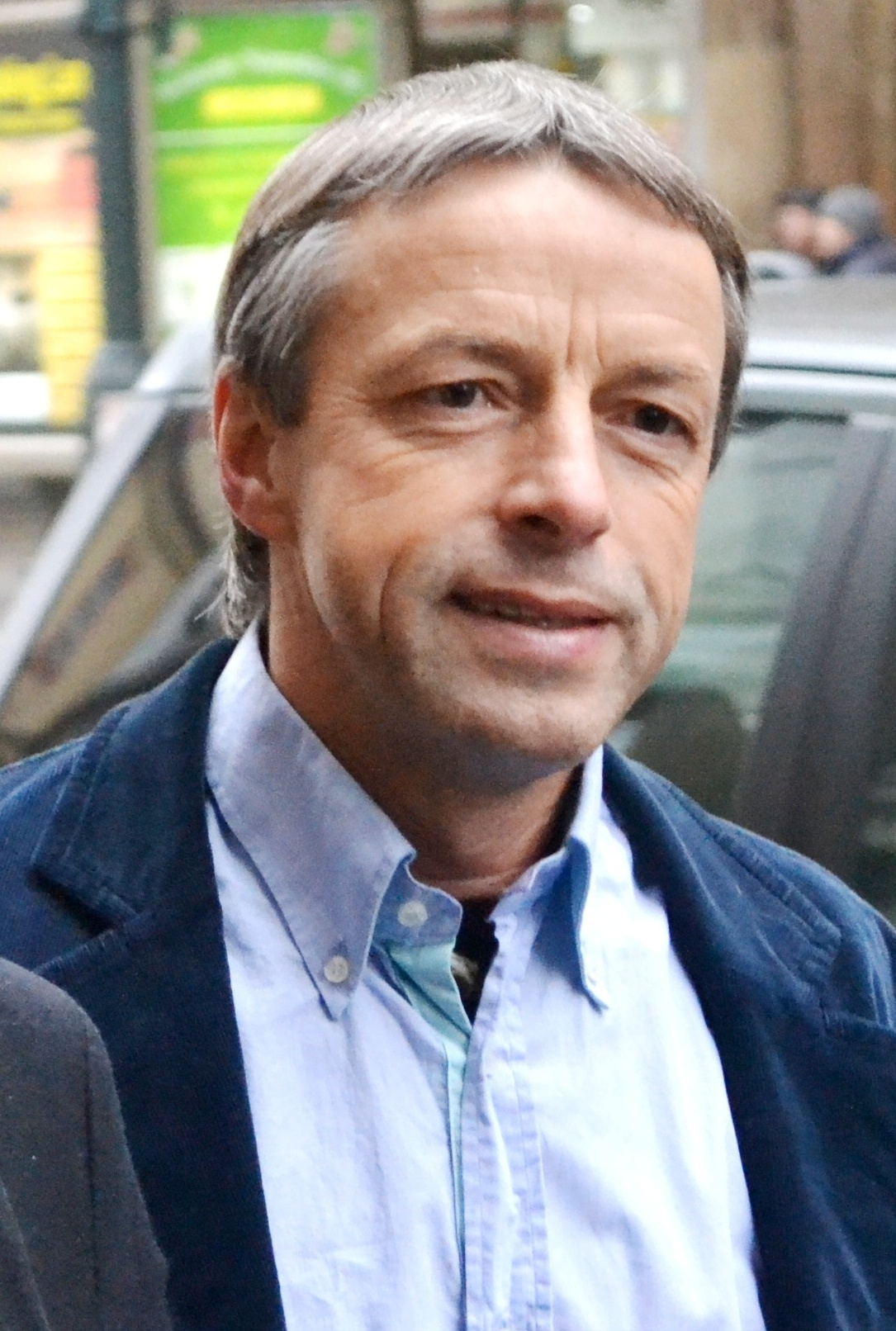

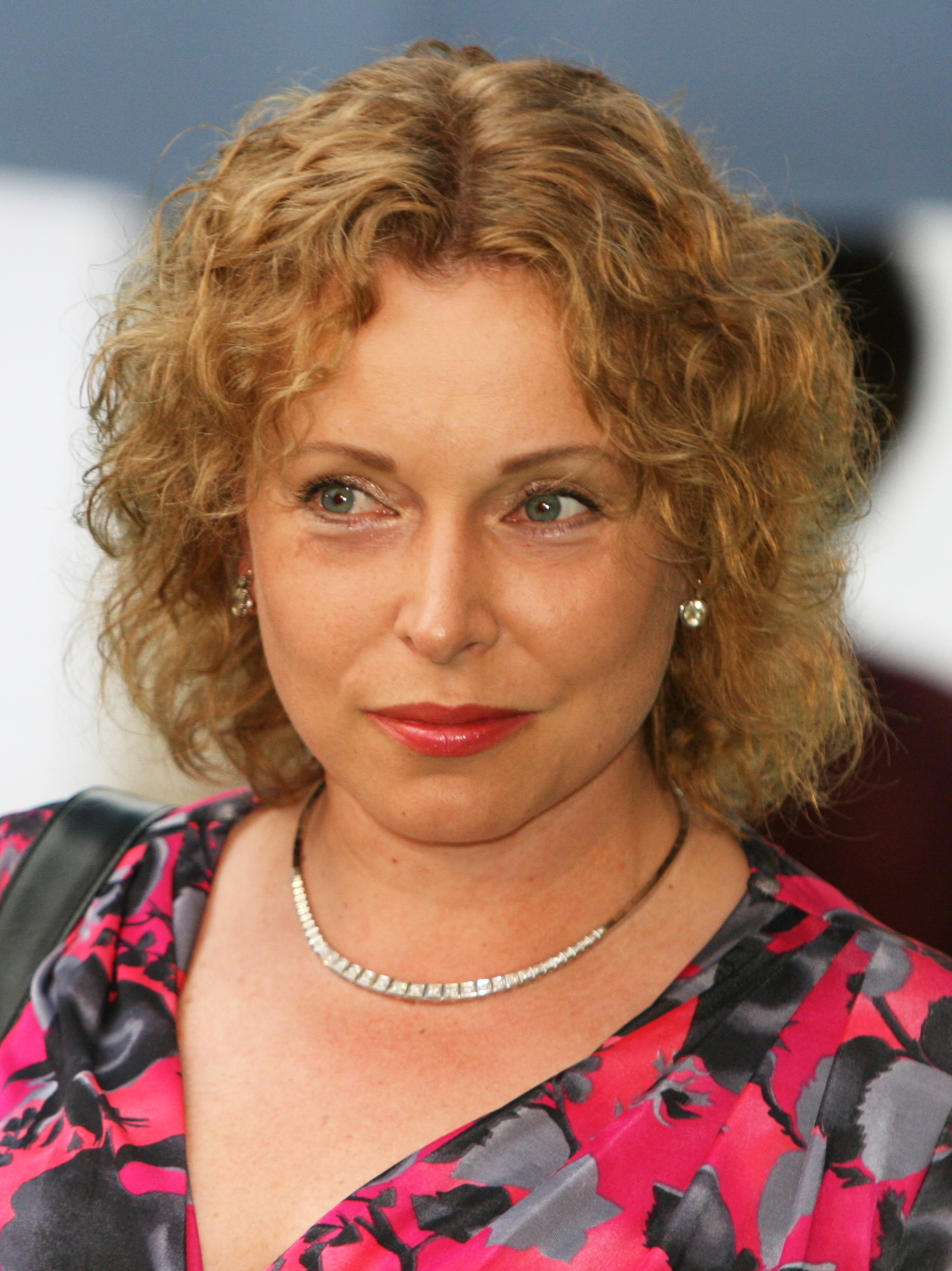
	First party	Second party
Leader	Pavel Bém	Petra Buzková
Party	ODS	ČSSD
Seats won	42	12
Popular vote	14,389,435	4,197,631
Percentage	54.4%	15.9%
Mayor before election
Pavel Bém
ODS
Elected mayor
Pavel Bém
ODS

The 2006 Prague municipal election was held as part of 2006 Czech municipal elections. It was held on 20 and 21 October 2006. Civic Democratic Party has won a majority in Prague's assembly. Pavel Bém remained Prague's mayor.

== Opinion polls ==
Published	Company	ODS	ČSSD	SZ	KSČM	KDU-ČSL	SNK-ED	others
29 September 2006	SC&C	46.0	17.0	12.0	6.0	4.0	4.0	14.0

== Results ==
Party	Vote	%Vote	Seats
Civic Democratic Party	14,389,435	54.43	42
Czech Social Democratic Party	4,197,631	15.88	12
Communist Party of Bohemia and Moravia	2,096,785	7.93	6
Green Party	2,062,958	7.80	6
SNK European Democrats	1,424,620	5.39	4
Christian and Democratic Union – Czechoslovak People's Party	861,818	3.26	0
Independents for Prague	861,818	1.09	0
SONOB Coalition	264,791	1.00	0
