= 1990 Prague municipal election =

- 23–24 November 1990

All 76 seats in the Assembly 39 seats needed for a majority
- Turnout: 64.3%
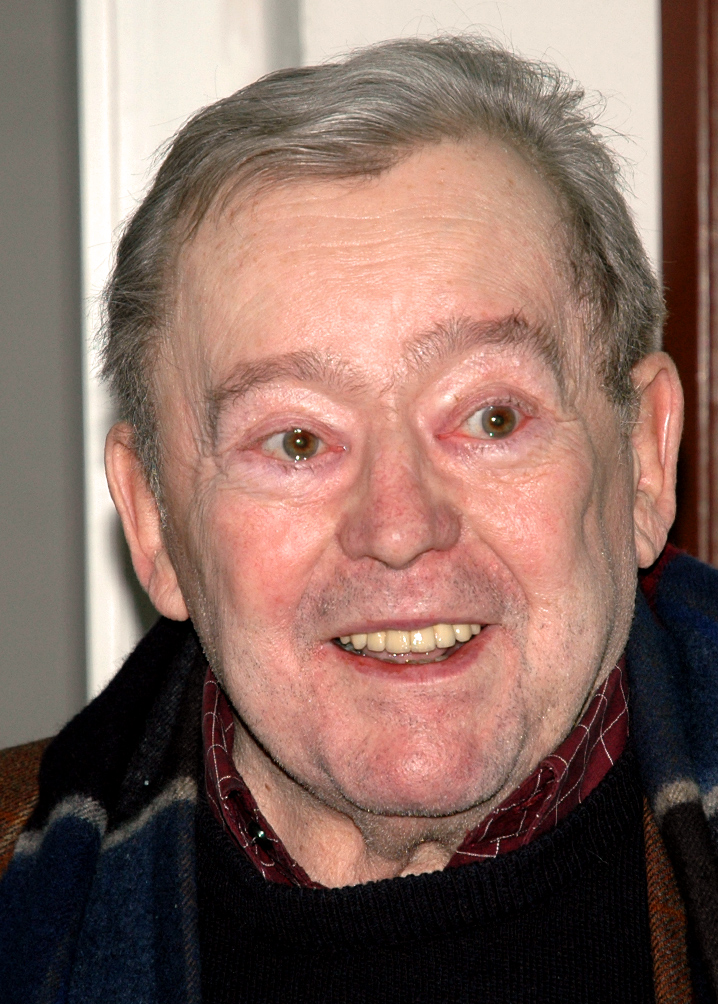

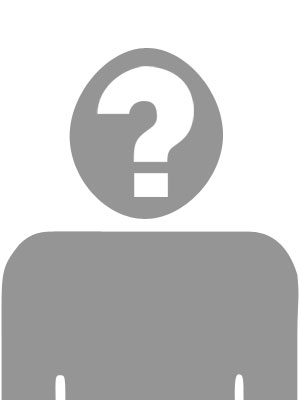

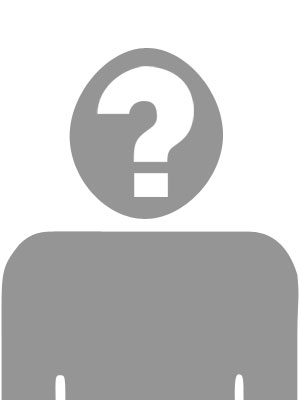

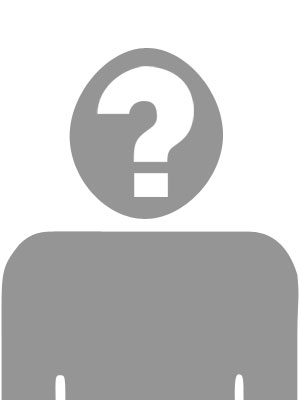

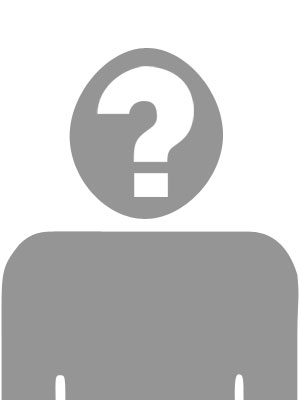
	First party	Second party	Third party
Leader	Jaroslav Kořán
Party	OF	KSČ	Greens
Seats won	38	11	9
Popular vote	4,058,286	1,234,294	278,914
Percentage	46.6	14.2%	3.2%
	Fourth party	Fifth party
Party	ČSSD	ČSL
Seats won	5	3
Popular vote	484,484	445,633
Percentage	5.6%	5.1%
Mayor before election
Jaroslav Kořán
OF
Elected mayor
Jaroslav Kořán
OF

The 1990 Prague municipal election was held as part of 1990 Czech municipal elections. It was the first election since Velvet Revolution. Civic Forum led by Jaroslav Kořán won the election.

== Results ==
Party	Vote	%Vote	Seats
Civic Forum	4,058,286	46.61%	38
Communist Party of Czechoslovakia	1,234,294	14.18%	11
Green Party	278,914	3.20%	9
Czechoslovak Social Democracy	484,484	5.56%	5
Czechoslovak People's Party	445,633	5.12%	3
Republican Union-Free Bloc	270,376	3.11%	3
Czechoslovak Socialist Party	147,630	1.70%	2
Club of Committed Non-Party Members	142,805	1.64%	2
Association of Independent Candidates	358,489	4.12%	1
Independent Candidates	267,478	3.07%	1
Christian Democratic Party	199,034	2.29%	1
National Social Party	194,691	2.24%	0
Liberal Democratic Party	158,535	1.80%	0
Czech-Slovak National Congress	104,241	1.20%	0
Other parties			0
