= Jan Kasl =

Czech architect and former politician

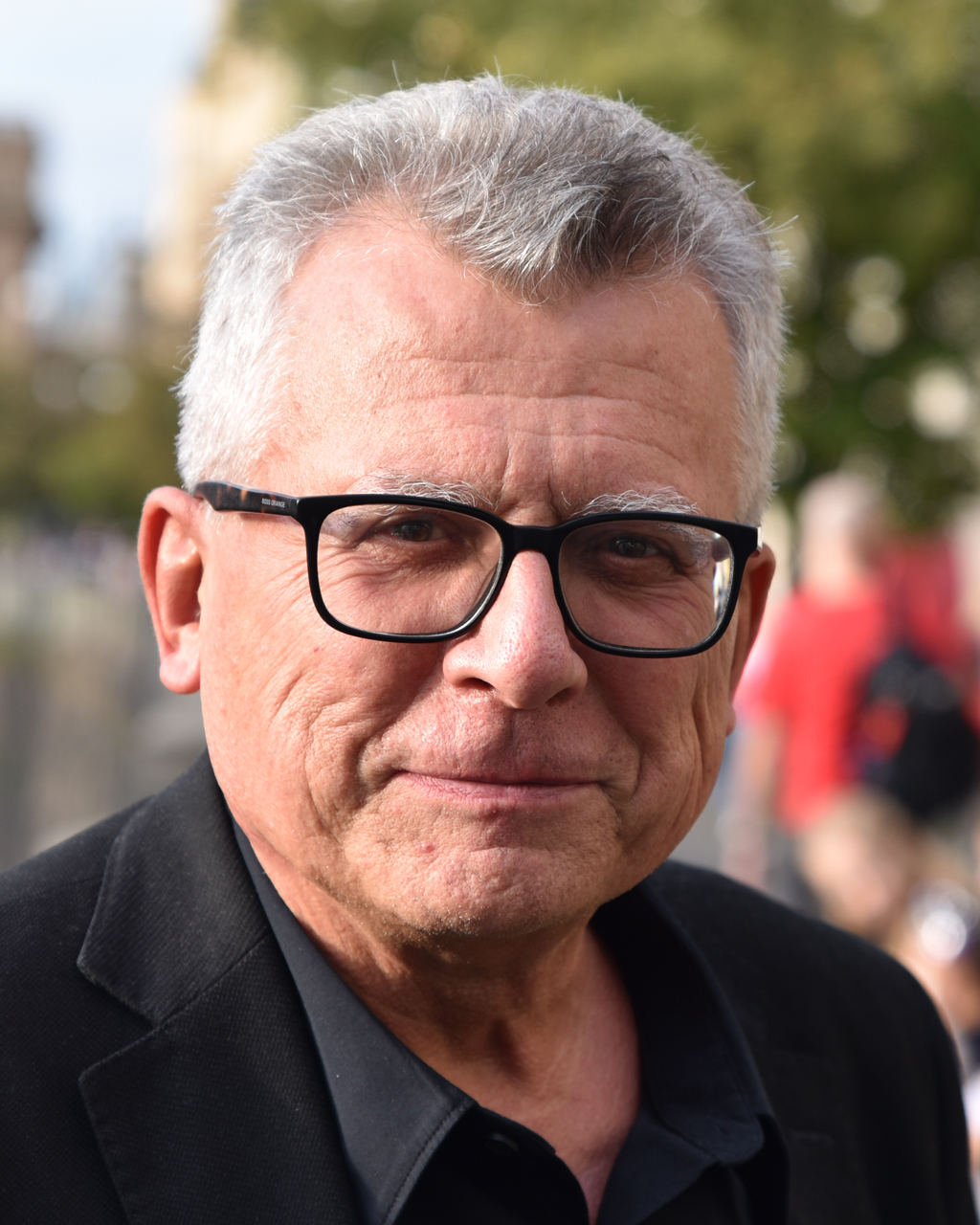
- Jan Kasl (2022)

Mayor of Prague
- In office 26 November 1998 – 28 May 2002
- Preceded by: Jan Koukal
- Succeeded by: Igor Němec

Member of the Prague City Assembly
- In office 24 November 1990 – 24 November 1994
- In office 14 November 1998 – 2 November 2006

Leader of the European Democrats
- In office 17 December 2002 – 28 January 2006

Personal details
- Born: 31 December 1951 (age 74) Prague, Czechoslovakia (now Czech Republic)
- Party: Civic Democratic Party (1991–2002); European Democrats (2002–2006); SNK European Democrats (2006); Independent (2006–present)
- Education: Czech Technical University in Prague
- Occupation: architect, politician

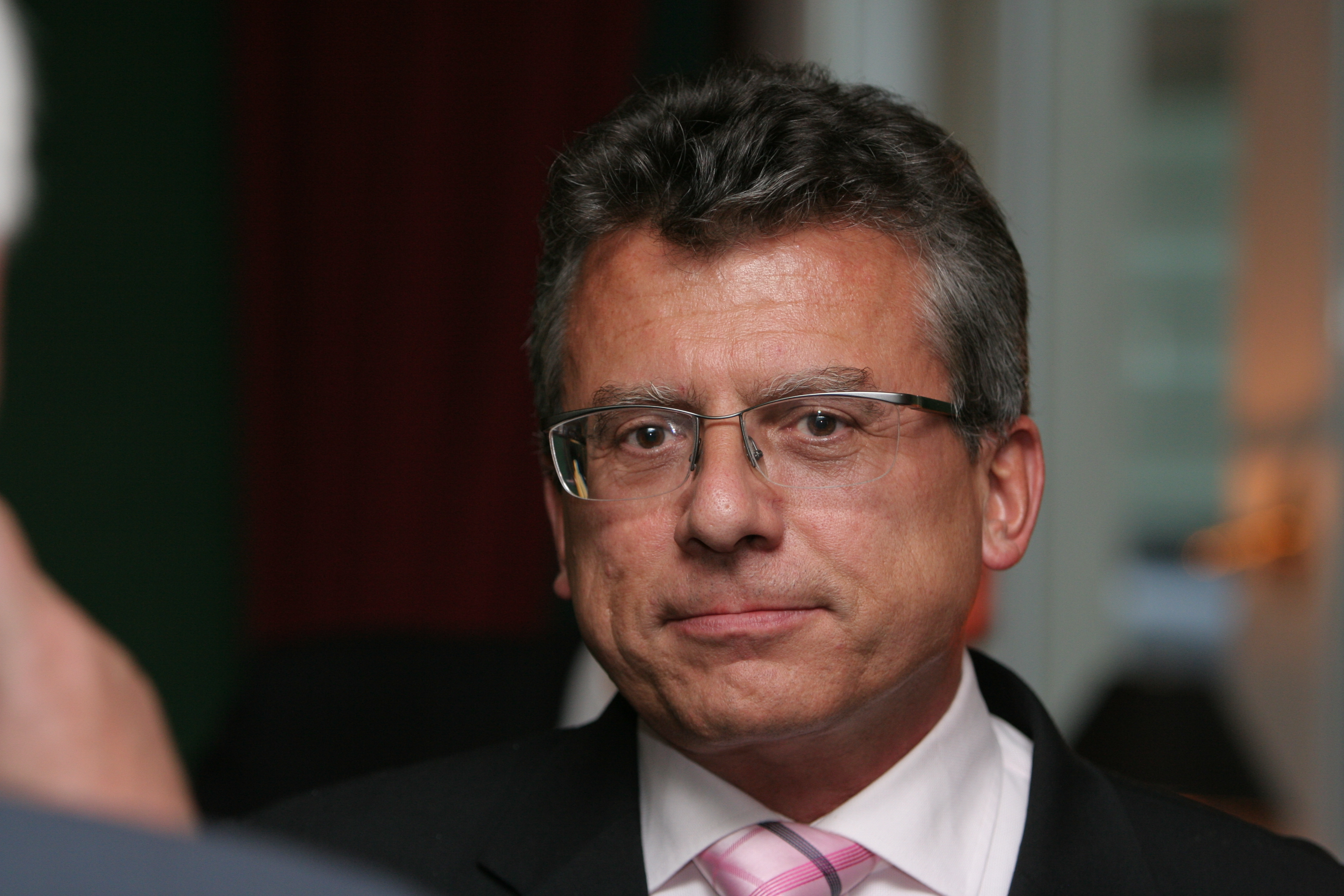
Jan Kasl (2007)

Jan Kasl (born 31 December 1951) is a Czech architect and former politician who served as the Mayor of the City of Prague from 1998 to 2002, and who led the European Democrats from 2002 to 2006.

== Biography ==
Jan Kasl was born in 1951 in Prague. He studied architecture at the Czech Technical University in Prague from 1970 to 1976. After graduation he worked as an architect for a cooperative housing enterprise. After the Velvet Revolution in 1989, he founded his own architectural company, which he left after he became mayor of Prague in 1998.

He is married for the second time with journalist Terezie Jungrová, his former media consultant and granddaughter of Ferdinand Peroutka. He has three daughters from his first marriage and two grandchildren.

== Political career ==
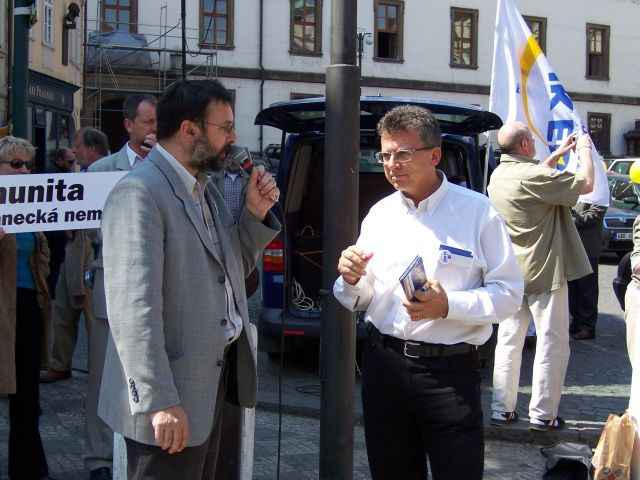
Jan Kasl (right) in election campaign in May 2006

After the Velvet Revolution he entered local politics in Prague. He was elected in 1990 into the city council for Civic Forum. After the break-up of Civic Forum he became a member of the conservative Civic Democratic Party (ODS). At the end of its term in the city council he left politics. He returned to politics in 1998, when he became the mayor of Prague at the head of a coalition between his ODS and the Czech Social Democratic Party, despite the opposition of each party's national leaders. In 2002, he resigned from the Civic Democratic Party two weeks before the parliamentary elections, because he thought that party was not able to deal with corruption, and as he opposed the party's cooperation with the Social Democrats. That December, he founded the European Democrats, which in 2006 he and most members left to merge into the SNK European Democrats, of which he became vice president. Two months after the 2006 parliamentary elections (in which party won 2.1% of the vote but no seats) he decided to leave politics and return to his profession as an architect.

In January 2014, Kasl was offered by ANO 2011 to serve as their lead candidate for the 2014 Prague municipal election. However, this offer was retracted that May, as Adriana Krnáčová was selected as lead candidate instead. In response that June, Kasl announced a run for the Prague City Assembly at the head of a new municipal non-partisan list, the Democrats of Jan Kasl, supported by the SNK European Democrats and by the United Democrats – Association of Independents, the latter of which was the legal successor to the European Democrats. Kasl's electoral list received 2.47% of votes and no seats, after which he again retired from politics.

== Career outside politics ==
Kasl established his own architectural studio in 2007. Since 2019, Kasl has been president of the Czech Chamber of Architects. He is a member of the Prague Society for International Cooperation, an NGO whose main goals are networking and the development of a new generation of responsible, well-informed leaders and thinkers.
