= Jan Koukal =

Czech politician

Mayor of Prague
- In office 13 May 1993 – 26 November 1998
- Preceded by: Milan Kondr
- Succeeded by: Jan Kasl

Czech Republic Ambassador to Austria
- In office 28 November 2006 – December 2012
- President: Václav Klaus
- Preceded by: Rudolf Jindrák
- Succeeded by: Jan Sechter

Member of the Prague City Assembly
- In office 24 November 1990 – 14 November 2002

Senator from Prague 6
- In office 16 November 1996 – 16 November 1998
- Preceded by: Office established
- Succeeded by: Jan Ruml

Personal details
- Born: 29 July 1951 (age 75) Brno, Czechoslovakia (now Czech Republic)
- Party: Civic Democratic Party (1991–2013/14)
- Education: Charles University
- Occupation: politician

Jan Koukal (born 29 July 1951 in Brno) is a Czech politician.

== Biography ==
After studying theoretical physics at the Charles University in Prague (1969–74) Koukal worked at the Czechoslovak Academy of Sciences, specialising on surface physics.

Jan Koukal has been a member of the Civic Democratic Party (ODS). From 1993 to 1998 he was mayor of Prague and from 1996 to 1998 member of Senate of the Czech Republic. In 2006, after a few months of training at the Ministry of Foreign Affairs, he was named as an ambassador of the Czech Republic in Austria.
