= Jiří Horák =

Czech politician and political analyst (1924–2003)

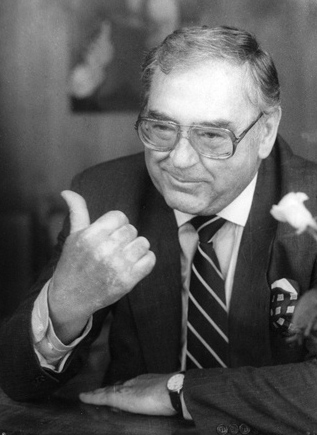
Jiří Horák in 1990

Jiří Horák (24 April 1924 in Hradec Králové – 25 July 2003 in Englewood, Florida) was a Czech politician. He was the first chairman of the Czech Social Democratic Party after the Velvet Revolution in 1989.

After 1945, Horák studied at Business Institute (Vysoká škola obchodní) in Prague and was active in the youth organisation of the Czechoslovak Social Democratic Party. When the Communist Party took all power (1948) he emigrated to West Germany and in 1951 to the United States. He studied politology at the Columbia University in New York. He subsequently taught Eastern European and Russian government and politics at Manhattan College, in Riverdale (Bronx) NY. In 1967, he obtained the position of professor there, where he taught until his retirement.

During his emigration, Horák participated in activities of social democracy in exile (in 1948 the party was forcibly merged with Communist Party). After the Communist Party lost its power (1989), he returned to Czechoslovakia and re-established the party, becoming its leader. During the 1990 election, the party failed to obtain seats in the parliament; Horák also got involved in internal party disputes. In the 1992 elections, the party narrowly obtained parliamentary presence. In 1993, Miloš Zeman replaced Horák as party leader.

In 1993, Horák returned to the United States, from where he criticised the new strategy of Czech social democracy.
