= Social Democracy (Czech Republic) =

Centre-left Czech political party

Social Democracy Sociální demokracie
- Abbreviation: SOCDEM
- Leader: Jiří Nedvěd
- Deputy Leaders: Radek Scherfer; Michal Chalupný; Alžběta Kálalová; Jiří Ott
- Founders: Josef Boleslav Pecka; Ladislav Zápotocký
- Founded: 7 April 1878; 148 years ago
- Headquarters: Lidový dům, Hybernská 1033/7, Prague 1
- Think tank: Masaryk Democratic Academy
- Youth wing: Young Social Democrats
- Women's wing: Social Democratic Women
- Religious wing: Christian Social Platform
- Membership (2025): 3,090
- Ideology: Social democracy Left-wing populism
- Political position: Centre-left
- National affiliation: National Front (1945–1948); Stačilo! (2025)
- European affiliation: Party of European Socialists
- European Parliament group: Progressive Alliance of Socialists and Democrats
- International affiliation: Progressive Alliance; Socialist International
- Colours: Pastel red
- Chamber of Deputies: 0 / 200
- Senate: 0 / 81
- European Parliament: 0 / 21
- Regional councils: 12 / 675
- Governors of the regions: 0 / 13
- Local councils: 220 / 61,677

Party flag

Website
- socdem.cz

Social Democracy (Czech: Sociální demokracie, SOCDEM), known as the Czech Social Democratic Party (Czech: Česká strana sociálně demokratická, ČSSD) until 10 June 2023, is a social democratic political party in the Czech Republic. Sitting on the centre-left of the political spectrum, it is a member of the Party of European Socialists, the Socialist International, and the Progressive Alliance. Masaryk Democratic Academy is the party-affiliated's think tank.

The ČSSD was a junior coalition party within Second cabinet of Andrej Babiš' minority government from June 2018, and was a senior coalition party from 1998 to 2006 and from 2013 to 2017. It held 15 seats in the Chamber of Deputies of the Czech Republic following the 2017 Czech parliamentary election in which the party lost 35 seats. From 2018 to 2021, the party was led by Jan Hamáček, who has since been replaced by Michal Šmarda as leader after the 2021 Czech parliamentary election, in which the party lost all of its seats after falling below 5%.

== History ==
The Czechoslavonic Social Democratic Party in Austria (Czech: Sociálně-demokratická strana českoslovanská v Rakousku, SSČR) was a political group founded on 7 April 1878 in Austria-Hungary as a regional wing of the Social Democratic Party of Austria. Founded in Břevnov atop earlier social democratic initiatives, such as the Ouls, it represented much of the Kingdom of Bohemia in the Austrian parliament, and its significant role in the political life of the empire was one of the factors that led to the creation of an independent Czechoslovakia. In 1893, the party renamed to Czechoslavonic Social Democratic Workers' Party (Czech: Českoslovanská sociálně demokratická strana dělnická, ČSDSD). After the collapse of Austria-Hungary at the end of World War I, the party renamed to Czechoslovak Social Democratic Workers' Party (Czech: Československá sociálně demokratická strana dělnická, ČSDSD) and became one of the leading parties of the first Czechoslovak Republic. Its members were split over whether to join the Comintern, which in 1921 resulted in the fracturing of the party, with a large part of its membership then forming the new Communist Party of Czechoslovakia. In 1938, the party renamed to National Labor Party (Czech: Národní strana práce, NSP) after merging of the left-faction of the Czechoslovak (National) Socialist Party.

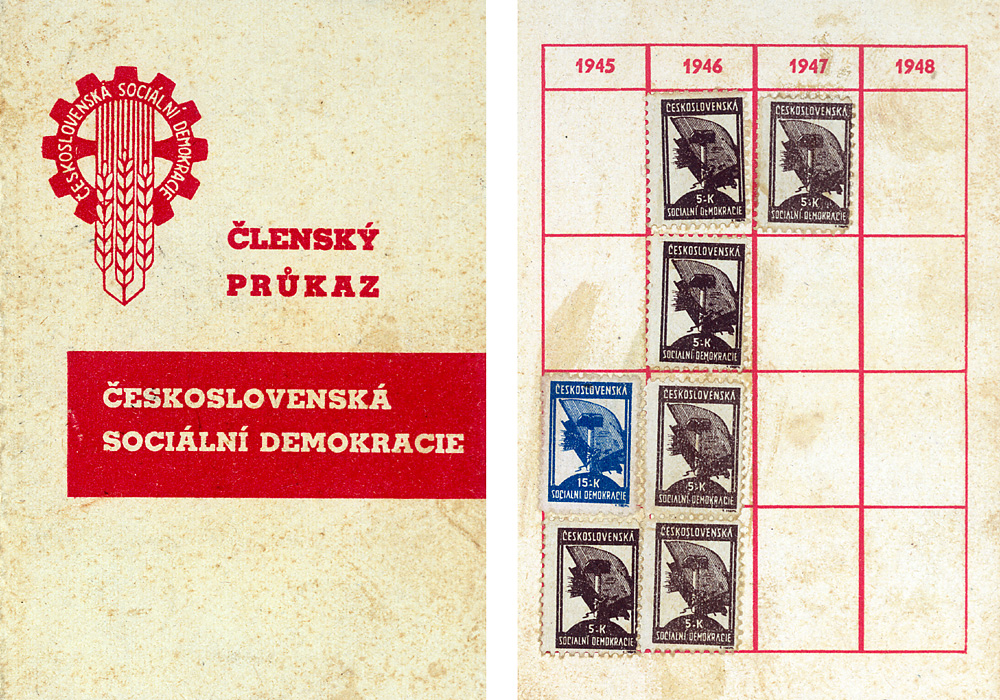
Party membership card, 1945

During the occupation of the Czech lands by Nazi Germany, the party was officially abolished, but its members organized resistance movements contrary to the laws of the German-controlled Protectorate of Bohemia and Moravia, both at home and abroad. After the re-establishment of the Czechoslovak Republic in 1945, the party renamed to Czechoslovak Social Democracy (Czech: Československá sociální demokracie, ČSD) and returned to its pre-war structure and became a member of the National Front which formed a new governing coalition. In 1948, after the Communist Party of Czechoslovakia gained a parliamentary majority, the ČSD was incorporated into the Communist Party. At the time of the Prague Spring, a reformist movement in 1968, there were talks about allowing the recreation of a social democratic party, but Soviet intervention put an end to such ideas. It was only after the Velvet Revolution of 1989 that the party was recreated. In 1993, the party renamed to Czech Social Democratic Party (Czech: Česká strana sociálně demokratická, ČSSD). Since the dissolution of Czechoslovakia, which came into effect on 1 January 1993, the ČSSD has been one of the major political parties of the Czech Republic, and until October 2017 was always one of the two parties with the largest number of seats in the Chamber of Deputies.

At the 1998 Czech parliamentary election, the party won the largest number of seats but failed to form a coalition government, so formed a minority government under its leader Miloš Zeman. With only 74 seats out of 200, the government had confidence and supply from the Civic Democratic Party (ODS), under the so-called Opposition Agreement. At the 2002 Czech parliamentary election, the party gained 70 of the 200 seats in the Chamber of Deputies of the Czech Republic. Its leader Vladimír Špidla became prime minister, heading a coalition with two small centre-right parties, the Christian and Democratic Union – Czechoslovak People's Party (KDU–ČSL) and the Freedom Union – Democratic Union (US-DEU) until he was forced to resign in 2004 after the ČSSD lost in the 2004 European Parliament election in the Czech Republic.

The next leader was Stanislav Gross, serving as leader from 26 June 2004 to 26 April 2005 and as prime minister from 4 August 2004 to 25 April 2005. He resigned after a scandal when he was unable to explain the source of money used to buy his house. The successor of Gross as prime minister was Jiří Paroubek, while Bohuslav Sobotka became acting party leader from 26 April 2005 to 13 May 2006. Paroubek was then elected as the new party leader in the run-up to the 2006 Czech parliamentary election, at which the party won 32.3% of the vote and 74 out of 200 seats. The election at first caused a stalemate, since the centre-right parties plus the Green Party and the centre-left parties each had exactly 100 seats. The stalemate was broken when two ČSSD deputies, Miloš Melčák and Michal Pohanka, abstained during a vote of confidence, allowing a coalition of the Civic Democrats (ODS), the KDU-ČSL, and the Green Party to form a government, while the ČSSD went into opposition.

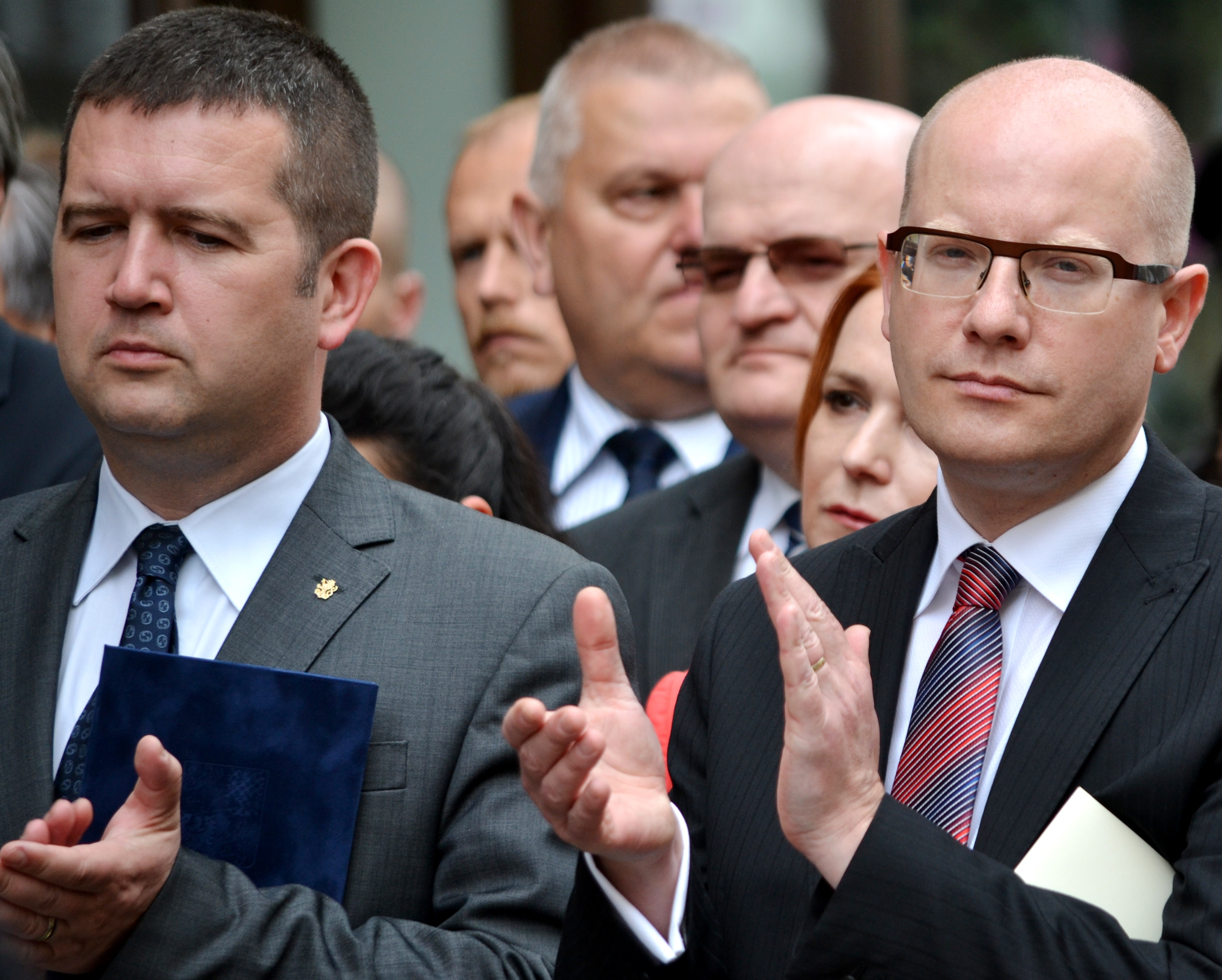
Former party leader and prime minister Bohuslav Sobotka (on the right) and the next former party leader and interior minister Jan Hamáček

At the 2010 Czech parliamentary election, the ČSSD gained 22.08% of the vote but remained the largest party, with 56 seats. Failing to form a governing coalition, it remained in opposition to a government coalition of the ODS, conservative TOP 09 and conservative-liberal Public Affairs parties. Paroubek resigned as leader on 7 June and was succeeded by Sobotka. It remained the largest party after the 2013 Czech parliamentary election, and in December of the same year formed a governing coalition with the populist ANO 2011 and the centrist Christian and Democratic Union – Czechoslovak People's Party. The leader of ČSSD, Bohuslav Sobotka, became the new Prime Minister of the Czech Republic.

The party suffered heavy losses in the 2017 Czech parliamentary election and was reduced to 15 seats, the worst result in its history. ČSSD suffered another defeat in the Prague Municipal, local and Senate elections in 2018. ČSSD lost 12 senators (only one managed to win re-election), all Prague deputies and more than half of their local councillors. In 2019 ČSSD lost all their representatives in the European Parliament. Some political commentators have interpreted the string of poor results as a sign of ČSSD losing their position in national politics. ČSSD suffered another defeat in 2020 Regional Elections and Senate elections, when they lost 10 senators (none re-elected) and 97 regional deputies. From 2018 to 2021, ČSSD had Jan Hamáček as First Deputy Prime Minister and Minister of Interior, Jana Maláčová as Minister of Labour and Social Affairs, Lubomír Zaorálek as Minister of Culture, and Miroslav Toman as Minister of Agriculture.

=== Extra-parliamentary party since 2021 ===
In the 2021 election the party fell short of the 5% threshold and subsequently lost all of its seats in the Chamber of Deputies. This came as a shock to much of the party membership, who were reportedly optimistic about party results even as predictions showed party losing its representation. Party chair Jan Hamáček resigned on the election day, as some high-ranking members blamed ANO for the loss.

Later that year, Mayor of the Nové Město na Moravě Michal Šmarda defeated former Minister of Labor Jana Maláčová in the leadership contest, vowing to return the party to Parliament. He also said he does not want to repeat the cooperation with ANO, as he reckoned that it will not exist when the next parliamentary election is held.

==== Relaunch ====
At its 2023, the party elected to change its name to just Social Democracy (Czech: Sociální demokracie, SOCDEM), and adopt a new visual identity with a new logo. Šmarda was reelected as chairman, claiming that the party will be an alternative to both a Spolu-led government and an ANO-led opposition. He also says he sees the party back at a 30% vote share in four years and at 10% in the next parliamentary election, claiming that under his leadership, SOCDEM will not form a government with ANO, ODS, TOP 09, SPD or KSČM.

For the 2023 Czech presidential election, the party nominated a trade union leader Josef Středula, though he dropped out shortly before the election. Šmarda refused to support any other candidate, but called on his fellow party members to vote against Andrej Babiš, Jaroslav Bašta and Karel Diviš.

Former party leader Lubomír Zaorálek was selected as the party's lead candidate for the 2024 European Parliament election. The party had chosen to run independently, after coalition talks with the Greens failed, but opted to invite Budoucnost members on its list. SOCDEM received 1.86% of the vote share at the election, failing to enter the European Parliament for the second consecutive time, and finishing 9th overall. Šmarda, describing the result as his personal failure, called for a new leadership election, blaming the party disunity for the result.

==== Under Jana Maláčová ====
After the unsuccessful election, Jana Maláčová was elected chairwoman of the party, defeating former Minister for Human Rights Jiří Dienstbier Jr.. Maláčová called for the party to shift to the left and called for a Czech version of the French New Ecological and Social People's Union alliance. Doing so, she refused to work with KSČM, causing a stir among some party members. Later, former ministers Jan Petříček, Petra Buzková and former party leader Jan Hamáček had left the party in protest.

Shortly after being elected, Maláčová began talks with the Stačilo! alliance, seeking cooperation for the 2025 Czech parliamentary election, citing the success of the French NUPES. This resulted in further protests from party members as well as the Young Social Democrats, which warned against another mass departure of members if SOCDEM collaborates with Stačilo!.

In February 2025, Maláčová announced that the talks had broken down, saying that Stačilo! was "not left-wing enough" and that it focused on anti-system politics rather than on social-economical issues. The party has added that it is still open to cooperation with other subjects.

On 7 April 2025, former MEP Libor Rouček left the party in protest against SOCDEM leaders secret negotiations with ANO for places on ANO's candidate lists for the 2025 Czech parliamentary election.

On 25 June 2025, SOCDEM leaders released a press release where they invited Stačilo! to cooperate for the 2025 Czech parliamentary election again. Former Minister for Human Rights Jiří Dienstbier Jr., Senator Petr Vícha, former MP Václav Votava, former MEP Miroslav Poche and governor of Pardubice Region Martin Netolický left the party in protest. Former Czech president, PM and ČSSD chairman Miloš Zeman commented cooperation between SOCDEM and Stačilo! as "sensible solution".

On 17 July 2025, both Stačilo! and SOCDEM agreed on cooperation for the 2025 Czech parliamentary election. Former SOCDEM leader Michal Šmarda announced that he will leave the party in protest.

On 21 July 2025, Maláčová at the Stačilo! press conference announced that she will lead Stačilo! in Prague, vice-chairman Jiří Nedvěd in Karlovy Vary Region and first vice-chairman Lubomír Zaorálek would be listed second in Moravian-Silesian Region after Stačilo! leader Kateřina Konečná. Forty SOCDEM members would be listed on Stačilo! candidate lists.

The party used to hold pro-European views until early 2020s. However, in August 2025, the party pledged to promote and follow the program of Stačilo!, which includes reconsideration and a referendum on the Czech Republic's withdrawal from NATO and the European Union. Maláčová stated that she sees no contradictions between the programs of SOCDEM and Stačilo!, arguing that their programs are "98% similar" and that SOCDEM "has long supported a general referendum, including on foreign policy issues". Czech political scientists Tomáš Cirhan and Mattia Collin wrote that since entering cooperation with Stačilo!, SOCDEM has shifted "towards a less pro-European stance and a more favourable position on Russia", and became increasingly divided in terms of stances in GAL-TAN dimension (progressive and traditional values on social issues).

Stačilo! failed to reach 5% threshold to get in parliament, thus SOCDEM failed to gain any deputies. On 6 October 2025, Máláčová announced that SOCDEM leaders would resign at an extraordinary congress.

==== Under Jiří Nedvěd ====
On 13 December 2025, Jiří Nedvěd was elected in a SOCDEM leadership election, with 69 out of 133 votes, defeating Petr Pavlík and Petr Hůla. Former Minister for Human Rights and Equal Opportunities Jan Chvojka, former Minister of Regional Development Radko Martínek, former Chairman of the SOCDEM Prague organization Petr Pavlík, the mayor of Náchod Jan Birke and the former PM and European Commissioner Vladimír Špidla left the party in protest.

==== Separation of the New Social Democracy ====
The initiative to establish a new party emerged from members of the Social Democracy after Jiří Nedvěd was elected chairman of the party at its congress in December 2025, which meant that critics of the party's previous direction — culminating in the unsuccessful joint candidacy with the Enough! movement in the October 2025 parliamentary elections — did not succeed.

The intention to found the New Social Democracy was presented on 1 May 2026, and the NSD was officially established on 19 June 2026. Members of the petition committee collecting the signatures required to found the new party included, among others, former Social Democratic prime minister Vladimír Špidla, former minister for human rights and equal opportunities Jiří Dienstbier, and Nedvěd's rival candidate Petr Pavlík. The NSD party was also supported by former Communist Party MP Jiří Dolejš.

== Organization ==
=== Names ===
Czech lands as part of Austria-Hungary:

- 1878–1893: Czechoslavonic Social Democratic Party in Austria (Sociálně-demokratická strana českoslovanská v Rakousku), then part of the Social Democratic Party of Austria
- 1893–1918: Czechoslavonic Social Democratic Workers' Party (Českoslovanská sociálně demokratická strana dělnická), an independent party

Czechoslovakia:

- 1918–1938: Czechoslovak Social Democratic Workers' Party (Československá sociálně demokratická strana dělnická), and was a member of the Labour and Socialist International between 1923 and 1938; after the split-up of Austria-Hungary, the portion of the party that ended up within the new Republic of Austria split from the main party to form the Czechoslovak Social Democratic Workers Party in the Republic of Austria
- 1938–1941: National Labour Party (Národní strana práce), which was a merger of the party with the left wing of the Czechoslovak National Socialist Party to unite the left in opposition to the ruling Party of National Unity
- 1945–1948: Czechoslovak Social Democracy (Československá sociální demokracie)
- 1948–1989: merged with the Communist Party of Czechoslovakia but concurrently existed as an exile party with its headquarters in London
- 1990–1993: Czechoslovak Social Democracy (Československá sociální demokracie)

Czech Republic:

- 1993–2023: Czech Social Democratic Party (Česká strana sociálně demokratická), keeping the previous abbreviation ČSSD
- Since June 2023: Social Democracy (Sociální demokracie), adopting the abbreviation SOCDEM.

=== Logos ===
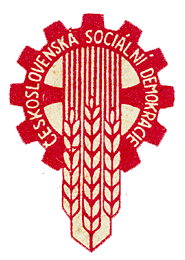
Party logo, 1945–1948 1990–1992
(1948–1990 in-exile)

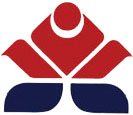
Party logo, 1992–1998

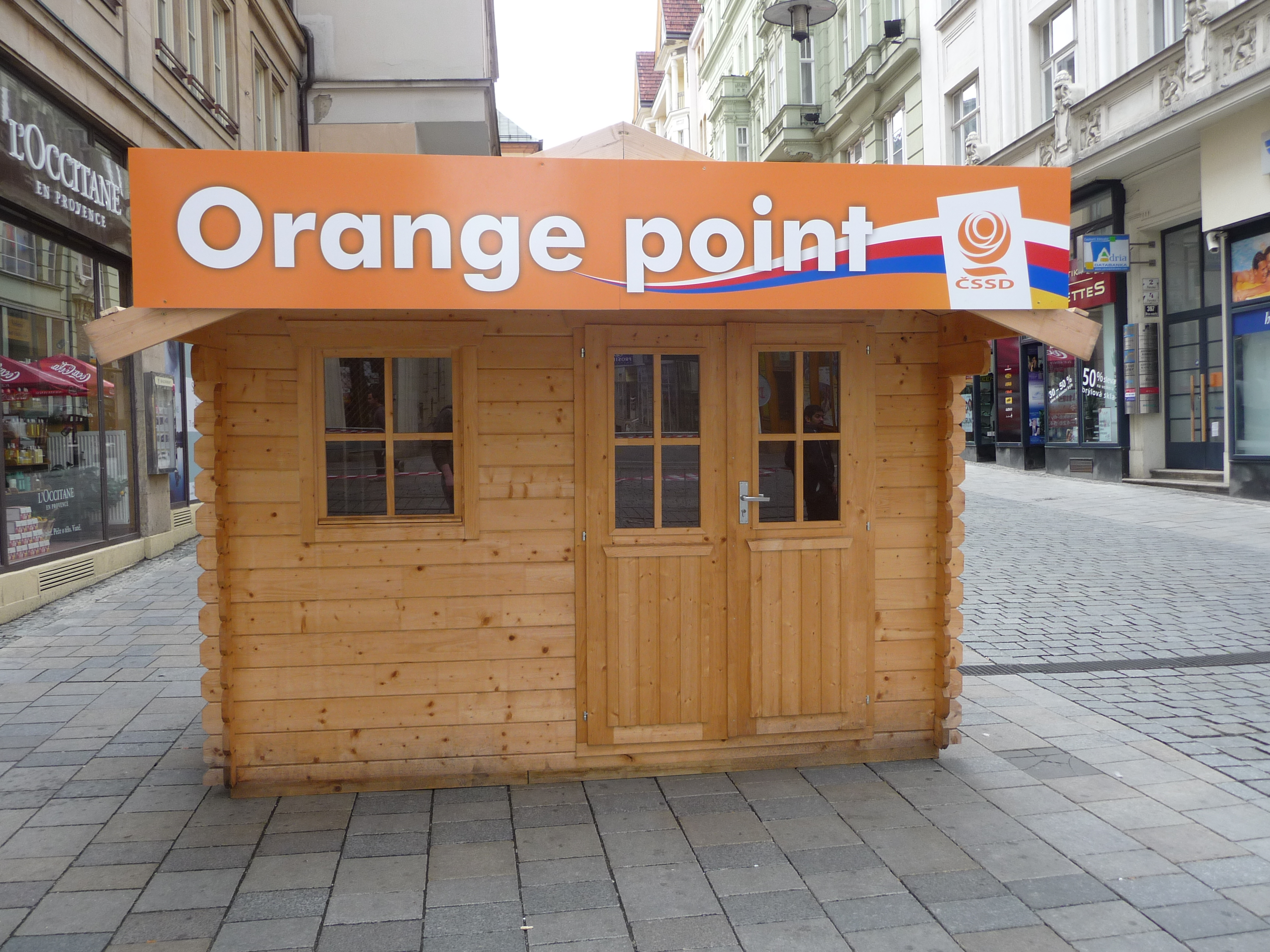
Party logo (until 2021) on a kiosk in 2010

Party logo, 2021–2023

Party logo, 2023–
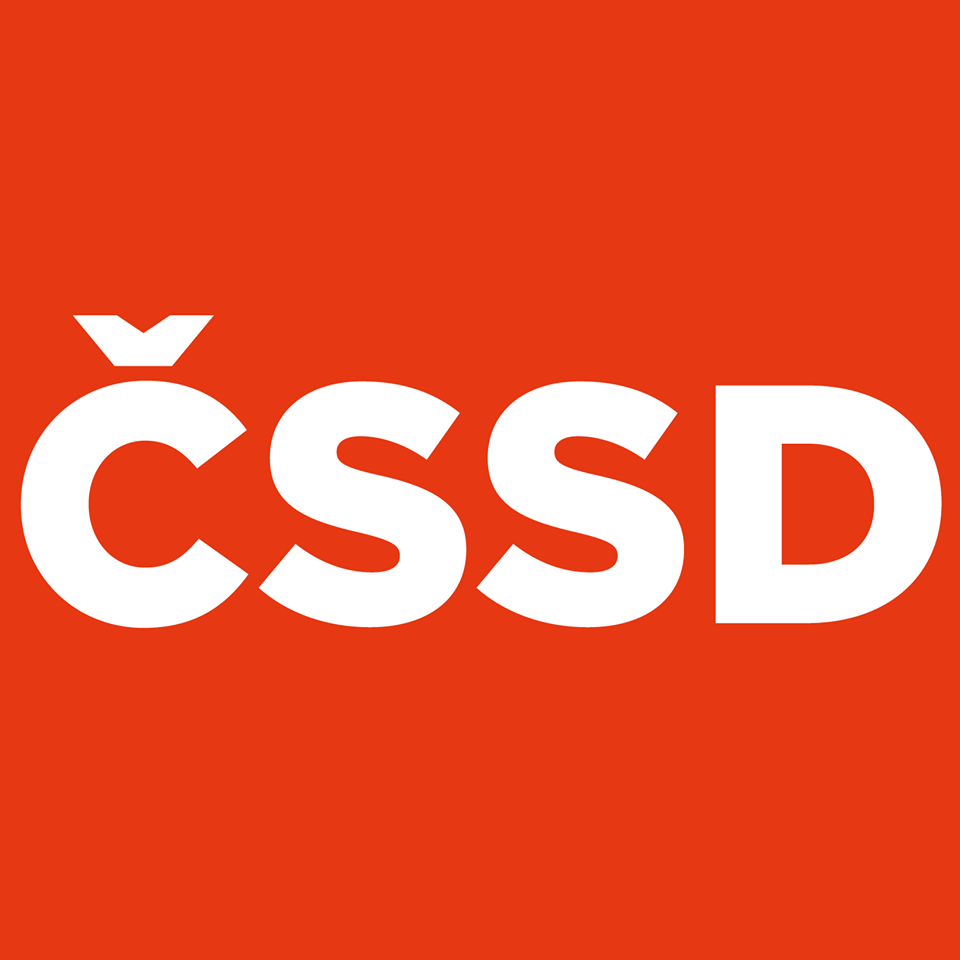
Electoral logo for 2020 elections

Electoral logo for 2021 elections

=== Policy positions ===
In economic matters, the ČSSD party platform is typical of Western European social democratic parties. It supports a mixed economy, a strong welfare state, and progressive taxation. In foreign policy, it supports European integration, including joining the Eurozone, and is critical of the foreign policy of the United States, especially when in opposition, though it does not oppose membership of the Czech Republic in NATO.

=== Membership ===
After 1989
| 1990 | 12,954 |
| 1991 | ▼12,468 |
| 1992 | ▼11,797 |
| 1993 | ▼11,031 |
| 1994 | ▼10,482 |
| 1995 | ▲11,757 |
| 1996 | ▲13,043 |
| 1997 | ▲14,121 |
| 1998 | ▲17,343 |
| 1999 | ▲18,762 |
| 2000 | ▼17,079 |
| 2001 | ▼16,300 |
| 2002 | ▲17,026 |
| 2003 | ▲17,913 |
| 2004 | ▼16,658 |
| 2005 | ▲16,750 |
| 2006 | ▲17,650 |
| 2007 | ▲18,354 |
| 2008 | ▲20,684 |
| 2009 | ▲24,497 |
| 2010 | ▼24,486 |
| 2011 | ▼24,000 |
| 2012 | ▼23,802 |
| 2013 | ▼22,881 |
| 2014 | ▲23,202 |
| 2015 | ▼21,501 |
| 2016 | ▼20,349 |
| 2017 | ▼19,477 |
| 2018 | ▼17,208 |
| 2019 | ▼13,845 |
| 2020 | ▼13,139 |
| 2021 | ▼11,531 |
| 2022 | ▼9,403 |
| 2023 | ▼7,539 |
| 2024 | ▼6,500 |
| 2025 | ▼3,090 |

Before 1948
| 1913 | 169,279 |
| 1932 | ▲194,857 |
| 1935 | ▲210,898 |
| 1947 | ▲363,735 |

Further references

== Election results ==
=== Cisleithanian elections ===
==== Imperial Council elections ====
| Date | Leader | Votes | | Seats | | | Position |
| Date | Leader | No. | % | No. | ± | Size | Position |
|---|---|---|---|---|---|---|---|
| 1907 | Antonín Němec | 389,960 | 8.5 | 22 / 516 | ▲22 | 6th | Opposition |
| 1911 | Antonín Němec | 357,234 | 7.9 | 25 / 516 | ▲3 | 4th | Opposition |

=== Czechoslovakia wide elections ===
==== Legislative elections ====
| Date | Leader | Votes | | Seats | | | Position |
| Date | Leader | No. | % | No. | ± | Size | Position |
|---|---|---|---|---|---|---|---|
| 1920 | Antonín Němec | 1,590,520 | 25.7 | 74 / 300 | ▲74 | 1st | Coalition |
| 1925 | Antonín Hampl | 632,403 | 8.9 | 25 / 300 | ▼45 | 4th | Coalition |
| 1929 | Antonín Hampl | 963,462 | 13 | 39 / 300 | ▲10 | 2nd | Opposition |
| 1935 | Antonín Hampl | 1,032,773 | 12.6 | 38 / 300 | ▼1 | 3rd | Coalition |
| 1946 | Zdeněk Fierlinger | 855,771 | 12.1 | 37 / 300 | ▼1 | 5th | Coalition |
| 1948 | as part of National Front | | | 23 / 300 | ▼14 | 3rd | Bloc |
| 1954 | Illegal. Merged into Communist Party. De jure in-exile. | | | | | | |
| 1960 | Illegal. Merged into Communist Party. De jure in-exile. | | | | | | |
| 1964 | Illegal. Merged into Communist Party. De jure in-exile. | | | | | | |
| 1971 | Illegal. Merged into Communist Party. De jure in-exile. | | | | | | |
| 1976 | Illegal. Merged into Communist Party. De jure in-exile. | | | | | | |
| 1981 | Illegal. Merged into Communist Party. De jure in-exile. | | | | | | |
| 1986 | Illegal. Merged into Communist Party. De jure in-exile. | | | | | | |
| 1990 | Jiří Horák | 342,455 | 3.2 | 0 / 150 | 0 | 9th | No seats |
| 1992 | Valtr Komárek; Alexander Dubček | 648,125 | 6.8 | 10 / 150 | ▲10 | 4th | Opposition |

=== Devolved assembly elections ===
==== Czech assembly elections ====
| Date | Leader | Votes | | Seats | | | Position |
| Date | Leader | No. | % | No. | ± | Size | Position |
|---|---|---|---|---|---|---|---|
| 1990 | Jiří Horák | 296,165 | 4.11 | 0 / 200 | 0 | 6th | No seats |
| 1992 | Jiří Horák | 422,736 | 6.53 | 16 / 200 | ▲16 | 3rd | Opposition |

==== Slovak assembly elections ====
| Date | Leader | Votes | | Seats | | | Position |
| Date | Leader | No. | % | No. | ± | Size | Position |
|---|---|---|---|---|---|---|---|
| 1928 | Ivan Dérer | 96,901 | 7.33 | 4 / 54 | ▲4 | 4th | – |
| 1935 | Ivan Dérer | 148,984 | 9.86 | 8 / 54 | ▲4 | 3rd | – |

=== Czech Republic wide elections ===
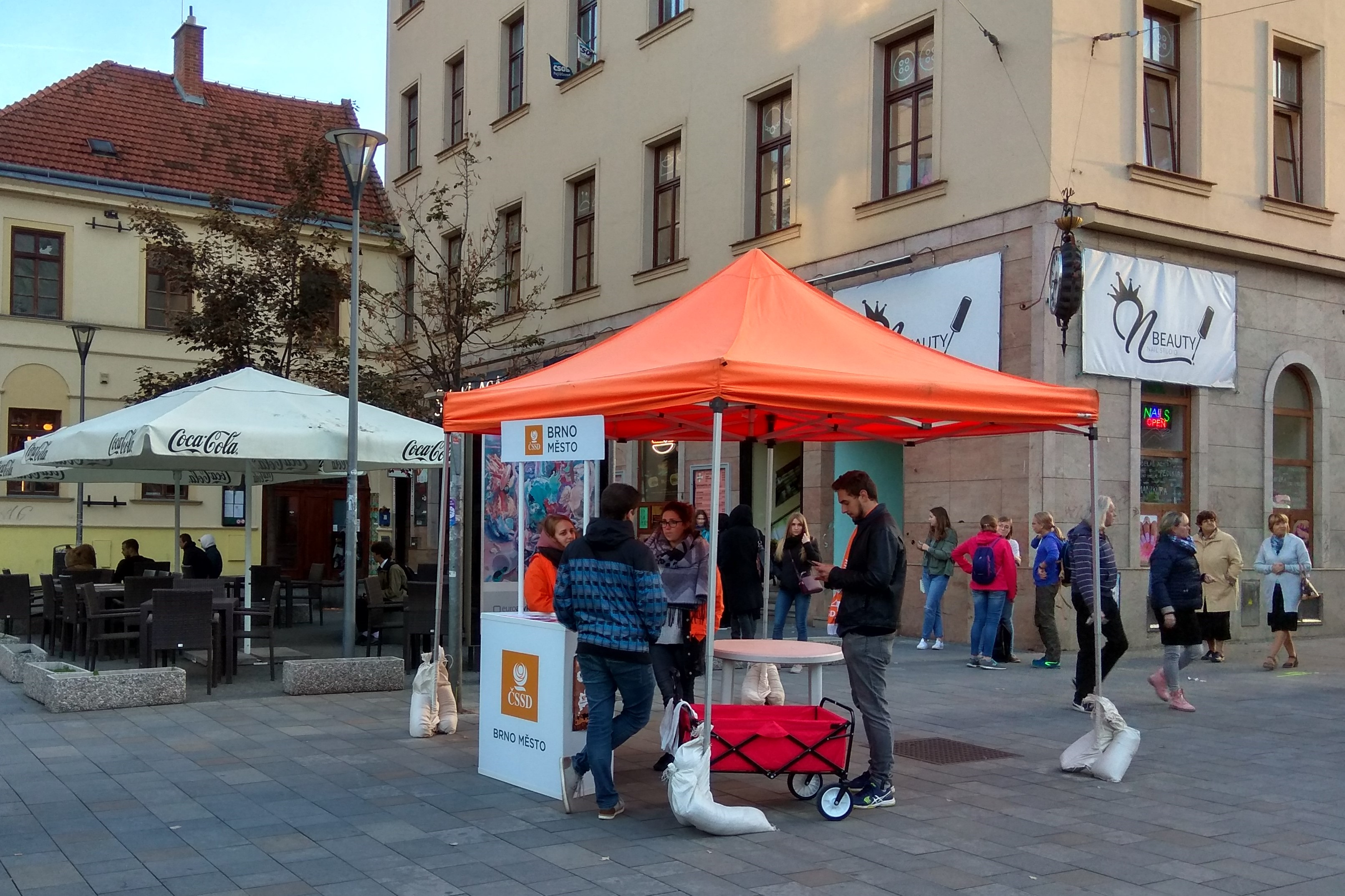
Pre-election meeting of 2018

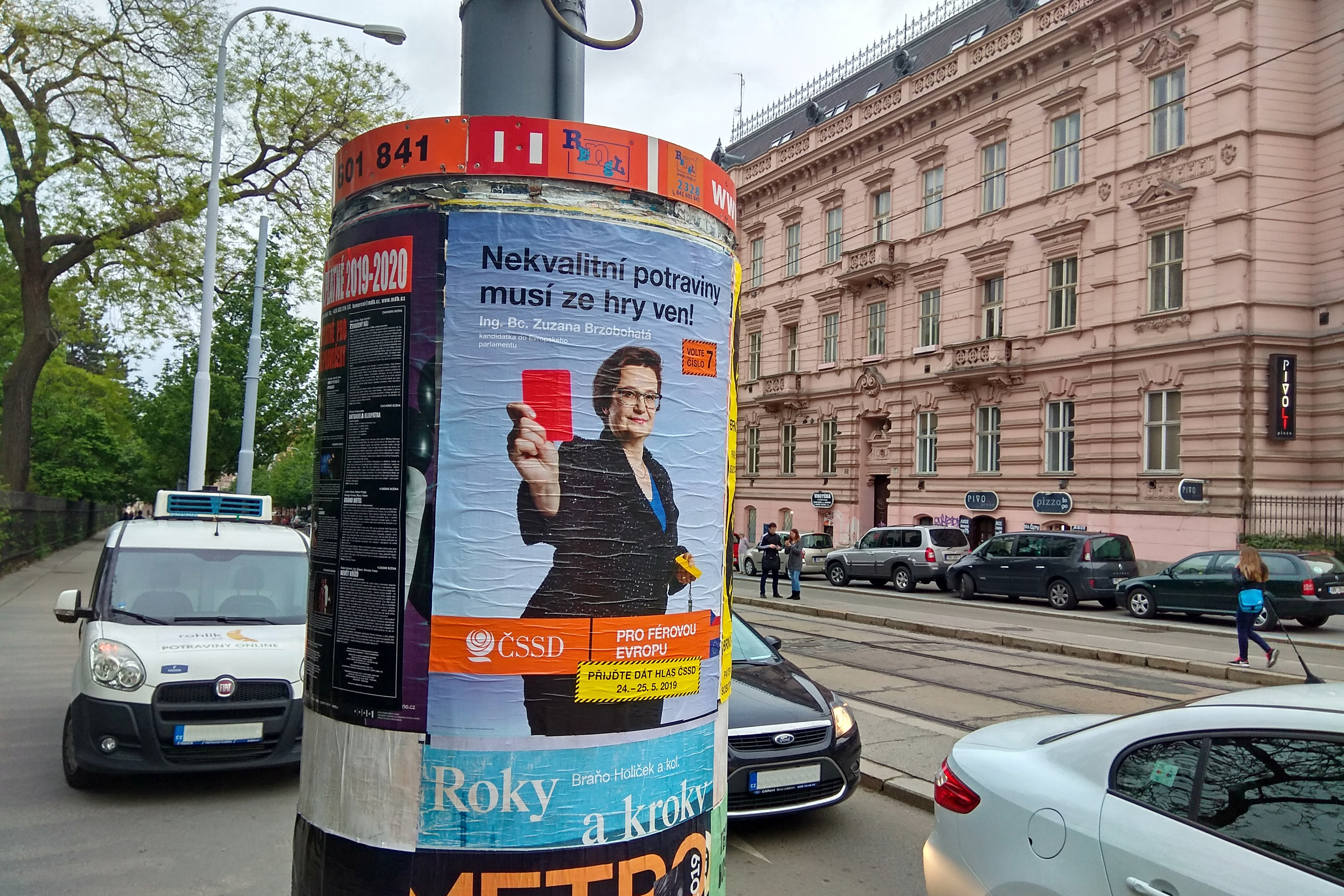
Election poster with the text "Poor quality food has to get out of the game" in 2019

==== Legislative elections ====
| Date | Leader | Votes | | Seats | | | Position |
| Date | Leader | No. | % | No. | ± | Size | Position |
|---|---|---|---|---|---|---|---|
| 1996 | Miloš Zeman | 1,602,250 | 26.4 | 61 / 200 | ▲45 | 2nd | External support |
| 1998 | Miloš Zeman | 1,928,660 | 32.3 | 74 / 200 | ▲13 | 1st | Minority |
| 2002 | Vladimír Špidla | 1,440,279 | 30.2 | 70 / 200 | ▼4 | 1st | Coalition (2002–2004) |
| 2002 | Vladimír Špidla | 1,440,279 | 30.2 | 70 / 200 | ▼4 | 1st | Coalition (2004–2005) |
| 2002 | Vladimír Špidla | 1,440,279 | 30.2 | 70 / 200 | ▼4 | 1st | Coalition (2005–2006) |
| 2006 | Jiří Paroubek | 1,728,827 | 32.3 | 74 / 200 | ▲4 | 2nd | Opposition (2006–2009) |
| 2006 | Jiří Paroubek | 1,728,827 | 32.3 | 74 / 200 | ▲4 | 2nd | Coalition (2009–2010) |
| 2010 | Jiří Paroubek | 1,155,267 | 22.1 | 56 / 200 | ▼18 | 1st | Opposition |
| 2013 | Bohuslav Sobotka | 1,016,829 | 20.5 | 50 / 200 | ▼6 | 1st | Coalition |
| 2017 | Lubomír Zaorálek | 368,347 | 7.3 | 15 / 200 | ▼35 | 6th | Opposition (2017–2018) |
| 2017 | Lubomír Zaorálek | 368,347 | 7.3 | 15 / 200 | ▼35 | 6th | Coalition (2018–2021) |
| 2021 | Jan Hamáček | 250,397 | 4.7 | 0 / 200 | ▼15 | 6th | No seats |
| 2025 | Jana Maláčová | 242,031 | 4.3 | 0 / 200 | 0 | 7th | No seats |
| 2025 | Part of Stačilo! list, which won 0 seats in total | | | | | | |

==== Senate elections ====
| Election | First round | | | | Second round | | | Seats | Total seats | Notes |
| Election | Votes | % | Runners-up | Place^{*} | Votes | % | Place^{*} | Seats | Total seats | Notes |
|---|---|---|---|---|---|---|---|---|---|---|
| 1996 | 559,304 | 20.3 | 48 / 81 | 2nd | 733,713 | 31.8 | 2nd | 25 / 81 | 25 / 81 | The whole Senate was elected. Only one third of Senate was elected in all subsequent elections. |
| 1998 | 208,845 | 21.7 | 5 / 27 | 3rd | 121,700 | 22.7 | 3rd | 3 / 27 | 23 / 81 | |
| 1999 | 327 | 1.0 | 0 / 1 | 5th | | | | 0 / 1 | 23 / 81 | By-election in Prague 1 district. |
| 2000 | 151,943 | 17.7 | 5 / 27 | 3rd | 53,503 | 9.5 | 5th | 1 / 27 | 15 / 81 | |
| 2002 | 122,397 | 18.4 | 14 / 27 | 2nd | 224,386 | 27.3 | 2nd | 7 / 27 | 11 / 81 | |
| 2003 | 2,424 | 6.8 | 0 / 2 | 6th | | | | 0 / 2 | 11 / 81 | By-elections in Strakonice and Brno-city district. |
| 2004 | 5,203 | 14.7 | 1 / 2 | 3rd | 5,358 | 20.51 | 3rd | 0 / 2 | 11 / 81 | By-elections in Prague 4 and Znojmo districts. |
| 2004 | 90,446 | 12.5 | 3 / 27 | 4th | 24,923 | 5.2 | 4th | 0 / 27 | 7 / 81 | |
| 2006 | 204,573 | 19.2 | 11 / 27 | 2nd | 120,127 | 20.9 | 2nd | 6 / 27 | 13 / 81 | |
| 2007 | 6,456 | 21.66 | 1 / 2 | 1st | 4,338 | 21.54 | 2nd | 1 / 2 | 13 / 81 | By-elections for Chomutov and Přerov |
| 2008 | 347,759 | 33.2 | 26 / 27 | 1st | 459,829 | 55.9 | 1st | 23 / 27 | 29 / 81 | |
| 2010 | 290,090 | 25.3 | 22 / 27 | 1st | 299,526 | 44.0 | 1st | 12 / 27 | 41 / 81 | |
| 2011 | 12,088 | 44.3 | 1 / 1 | 1st | 13,505 | 65.1 | 1st | 1 / 1 | 41 / 81 | By-election in Kladno district |
| 2012 | 199,957 | 22.7 | 23 / 27 | 1st | 207,064 | 40.3 | 1st | 13 / 27 | 46 / 81 | |
| 2014 | 3,695 | 16.1 | 0 / 1 | 3rd | | | | 0 / 1 | 46 / 81 | By-election in Zlín district |
| 2014 | 226,239 | 22.0 | 19 / 27 | 1st | 165,629 | 35.0 | 1st | 10 / 27 | 33 / 81 | |
| 2014 | 2,092 | 16.8 | 1 / 1 | 1st | 3,664 | 50.9 | 1st | 1 / 1 | 33 / 81 | By-election in Prague 10 district, Ivana Cabrnochová was a Green Party candidate supported by ČSSD |
| 2016 | 128,875 | 14.6 | 9 / 27 | 2nd | 55,622 | 13.1 | 3rd | 2 / 27 | 25 / 81 | |
| 2018 | 1,294 | 5.7 | 0 / 1 | 6th | | | | 0 / 1 | 25 / 81 | By-election in Trutnov district. |
| 2018 | 1,270 | 7.5 | 0 / 1 | 6th | | | | 0 / 1 | 25 / 81 | By-election in Zlín district. |
| 2018 | 100,478 | 9.2 | 5 / 27 | 3rd | 33,887 | 8.10 | 6th | 1 / 27 | 13 / 81 | |
| 2019 | 2,674 | 13.9 | 0 / 1 | 3rd | | | | 0 / 1 | 13 / 81 | By-election in Prague 9 district, Petr Daubner was a Czech Pirate Party candidate supported by ČSSD |
| 2020 | 81,105 | 8.1 | 3 / 27 | 5th | 18,175 | 4.0 | 8th | 0 / 27 | 3 / 81 | |
| 2022 | 43,870 | 3.9 | 1 / 27 | 7th | 10,344 | 2.2 | 9th | 0 / 27 | 1 / 81 | |
| 2024 | 28,479 | 3.59 | 0 / 27 | 7th | | | | 1 / 27 | 1 / 81 | |
| 2026 | 2,456 | 0.21 | 0 / 27 | 37th | | | | 0 / 27 | 0 / 81 | |

Notes

- In 1996, the whole Senate elected (81 seats), while in next elections only one third of seats is to be contested.

==== Presidential elections ====
| Indirect election | Candidate | First round result | | | Second round result | | | Third round result | | |
| Indirect election | Candidate | Votes | % | Result | Votes | % | Result | Votes | % | Result |
|---|---|---|---|---|---|---|---|---|---|---|
| 1998 | Václav Havel | 130 | 70.65 | Runner-up | 146 | 52.3 | Won | — | | |
| 2003 | | | | | | | | | | |
| 2003 | Jaroslav Bureš | 46 | 17.04 | Eliminated | — | | | | | |
| 2003 | Miloš Zeman | 83 | 30.18 | Eliminated | — | | | | | |
| 2003 | Jan Sokol | 128 | 46.55 | Runner-up | 129 | 48.13 | Runner-up | 124 | 46.6 | Lost |
| 2008 | Jan Švejnar | 138 | 49.82 | Runner-up | 135 | 48.74 | Runner-up | 113 | 44.84 | Lost |
| 2008 | Jan Švejnar | 128 | 49.10 | Runner-up | 141 | 47.19 | Runner-up | 111 | 44.05 | Lost |

| Direct election | Candidate | First round result | | | Second round result | | |
| Direct election | Candidate | Votes | % | Result | Votes | % | Result |
|---|---|---|---|---|---|---|---|
| 2013 | Jiří Dienstbier Jr. | 829,297 | 16.12 | 4th | Supported Miloš Zeman | | |
| 2018 | No candidate | | | | | | |
| 2023 | Josef Středula | withdrawn | | | | | |

==== European Parliament elections ====
| Election | List leader | Votes | % | Seats | +/− | EP Group |
|---|---|---|---|---|---|---|
| 2004 | Libor Rouček | 204,903 | 8.78 (#5) | 2 / 25 | New | PES |
| 2009 | Jiří Havel | 528,132 | 22.39 (#2) | 7 / 22 | ▲5 | S&D |
| 2014 | Jan Keller | 214,800 | 14.17 (#3) | 4 / 21 | ▼3 | S&D |
| 2019 | Pavel Poc | 93,664 | 3.95 (#8) | 0 / 21 | ▼4 | − |
| 2024 | Lubomír Zaorálek | 55,260 | 1.86 (#9) | 0 / 21 | 0 | − |

==== Regional elections ====
| Election | Votes | % | Councillors |
|---|---|---|---|
| 2000 | 344,441 | 14.67 | 112 / 675 |
| 2004 | 297,083 | 14.03 | 105 / 675 |
| 2008 | 1,044,719 | 35.86 | 280 / 675 |
| 2012 | 621,961 | 23.58 | 205 / 675 |
| 2016 | 386,150 | 15.25 | 125 / 675 |
| 2020 | 185,714 | 6.71 | 37 / 675 |
| 2024 | 83,829 | 3.52 | 13 / 685 |

==== Local elections ====
| Election | % | Councillors |
|---|---|---|
| 1994 | 8.7 | 1,628 |
| 1998 | 17.54 | 4,259 |
| 2002 | 15.57 | 4,664 |
| 2006 | 16.61 | 4,331 |
| 2010 | 19.68 | 4,584 |
| 2014 | 12.65 | 3,773 |
| 2018 | 5.17 | 1,882 |
| 2022 | 2.49 | 799 |
| 2026 | 0.49 | 220 |

==== Prague municipal elections ====
| Year | Leader | Vote | % | Seats | +/− | Place | Position |
|---|---|---|---|---|---|---|---|
| 1990 | | 484,484 | 5.6 | 5 / 76 | | 4th | Opposition |
| 1994 | Jiří Paroubek | 2,435,279 | 8.6 | 5 / 55 | Steady | 4th | Opposition |
| 1998 | Jiří Paroubek | 363,917 | 17.5 | 10 / 55 | ▲5 | 3rd | Coalition |
| 2002 | Jiří Paroubek | 656,936 | 14.7 | 12 / 70 | ▲2 | 3rd | Coalition |
| 2006 | Petra Buzková | 4,197,631 | 15.9 | 12 / 70 | Steady | 2nd | Opposition |
| 2010 | Jiří Dienstbier Jr. | 615,209 | 17.9 | 19 / 65 | ▲7 | 2nd | Coalition |
| 2014 | Miloslav Ludvík | 2,160,963 | 10.4 | 8 / 65 | ▼11 | 5th | Coalition |
| 2018 | Jakub Landovský | 727,826 | 2.9 | 0 / 65 | ▼8 | 8th | No seats |

== Chairmen ==
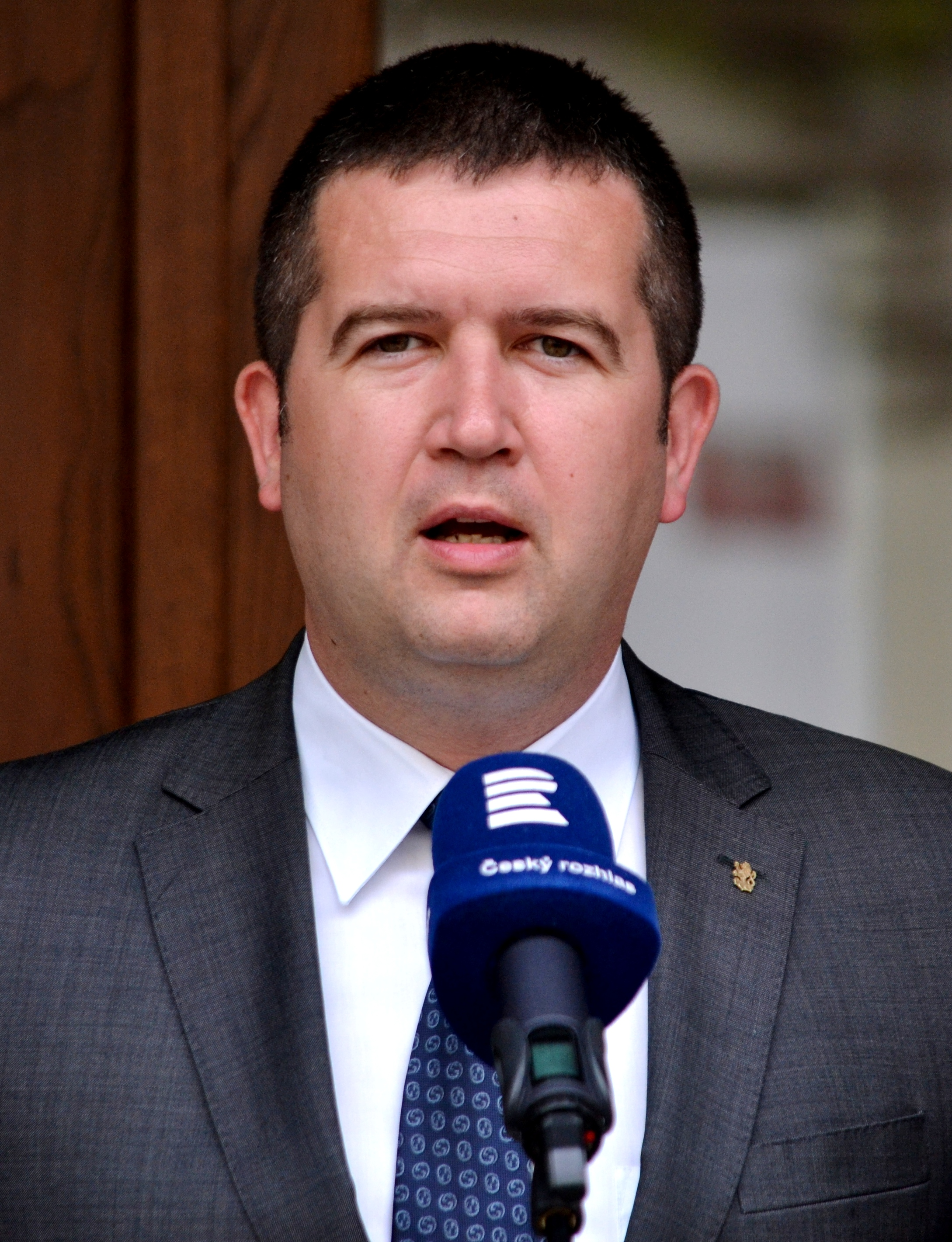
Former leader Jan Hamáček

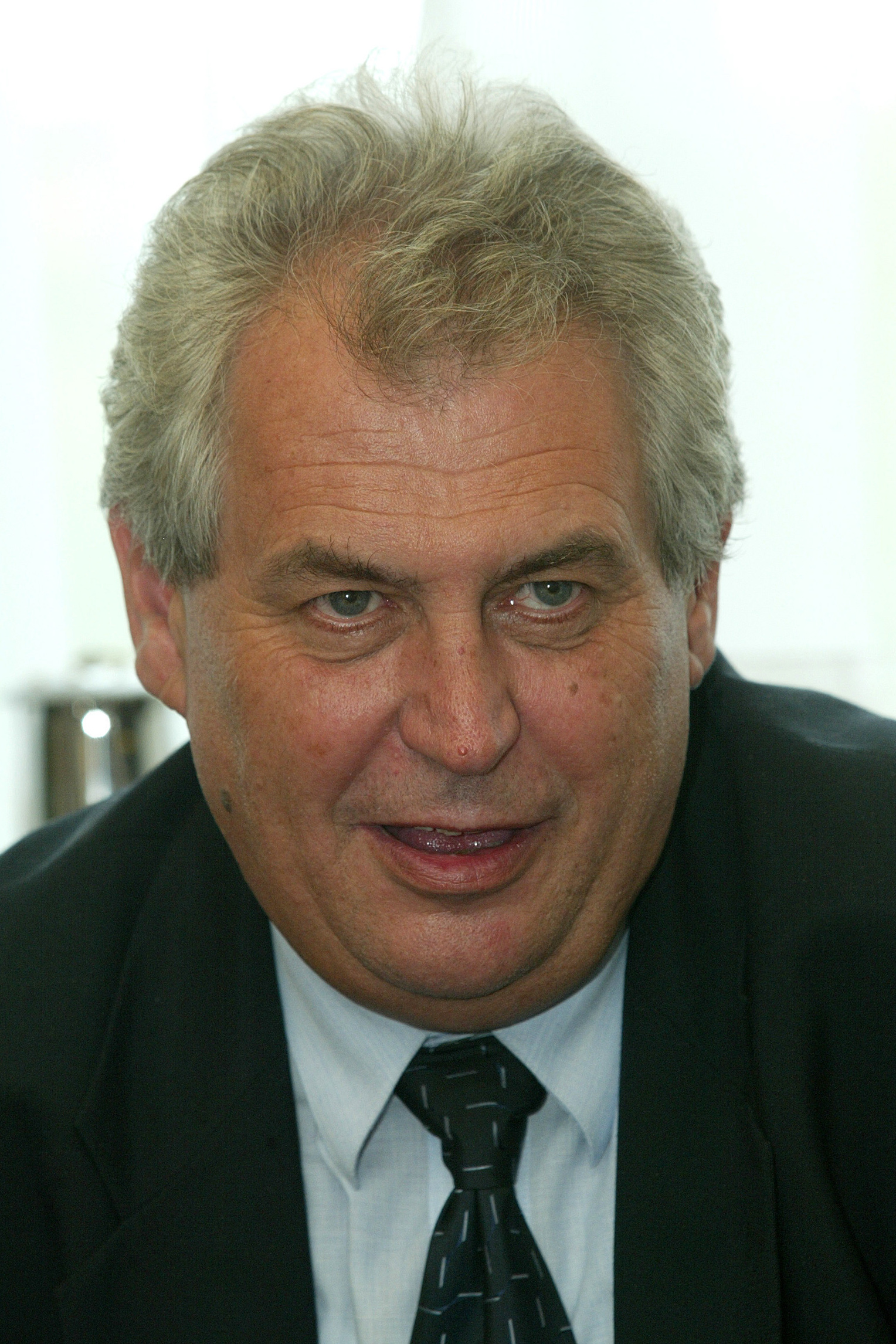
Former party leader Miloš Zeman, President of the Czech Republic from 2013 to 2023

=== Czechoslavonic Social Democratic Party in Austria ===
- Josef Boleslav Pecka (1878–1893)
- Josef Hybeš (1887–1893)

=== Czechoslavonic Social Democratic Workers' Party ===
- Josef Steiner (1893–1904)
- Antonín Němec (1904–1915)
- Bohumír Šmeral (1916–1917)

=== Czechoslovak Social Democratic Workers' Party ===
- Antonín Němec (1917–1925)
- Antonín Hampl (1925–1938)

=== Czechoslovak Social Democracy ===
- Zdeněk Fierlinger (1945–1947)
- Bohumil Laušman (1947–1948)

=== Czechoslovak Social Democracy in-exile ===
- Blažej Vilím (1948)
- Václav Majer (1948–1972)
- Vilém Bernard (1972–1989)
- Karel Hrubý

=== Czechoslovak Social Democracy ===
- Slavomír Klaban (1989–1990)
- Jiří Horák (1990–1993)

=== Czech Social Democratic Party ===
- Miloš Zeman (28 February 1993 – April 2001)
- Vladimír Špidla (April 2001 – 26 July 2004)
- Stanislav Gross (26 July 2004 – 26 April 2005)
  - Bohuslav Sobotka (2005–2006; acting)
- Jiří Paroubek (2006–2010)
- Bohuslav Sobotka (2011–2017)
  - Milan Chovanec (2017–2018; acting)
- Jan Hamáček (2018–2021)
  - Roman Onderka (2021; acting)
- Michal Šmarda (2021–2023)

=== Social Democracy ===
- Michal Šmarda (2023–2024)
- Jana Maláčová (2024–2025)
- Jiří Nedvěd (since 2025)
