= Senate district 26 – Prague 2 =

Electoral district in the Czech Republic

Coordinates: 50°05′07″N 14°28′39″E

26 – Prague 2
- inline Senate district of the Czech Republic

- The Prague-2 district on a map
- Senator: Miroslav Bárta; STAN
- Region: Capital City of Prague
- District: Prague
- Electorate: 78039
- Area: 29.59 km²
- Last election: 2024
- Next election: 2030

Senate district 26 – Prague 2 is an electoral district of the Senate of the Czech Republic, which is entirely located in the Capital City of Prague. From 2024, a Mayors and Independents nominee Miroslav Bárta is representing the district.

== Senators ==
Year	Senator	Party
1996 (Note: Election for shortened four-year term)	Vladimír Zeman	ODS
2000	Daniela Filipiová	ODS
2006	Daniela Filipiová	ODS
2012	Libor Michálek	Pirates
2018	Marek Hilšer	MHS
2024	Miroslav Bárta	STAN

== Election results ==
=== 1996 ===
1996 Czech Senate election in Prague 2
Candidate	Party	1st round	
Candidate	Party	Votes	%
Vladimír Zeman	ODS	24 167	53,79
Dana Němcová	KDU-ČSL	6 467	14,40
Věněk Šilhán	ČSSD	6 324	14,08
Václav Věrtelář	KSČM	2 633	5,86
Jiří Svoboda	SDL	2 530	5,63
Jan Nekola	Independent	1 747	3,89
Jan Votoček	PB	1 057	2,35

=== 2000 ===
2000 Czech Senate election in Prague 2
Candidate	Party	1st round		2nd round	
Candidate	Party	Votes	%	Votes	%
Daniela Filipiová	ODS	11 770	39,53	12 036	54,29
Vladimír Zeman	4KOALICE	9 373	31,48	10 131	45,70
Vladimír Polanecký	ČSSD	5 413	18,18	—	—
Jaroslav Lemák	KSČM	3 214	10,79	—	—

=== 2006 ===
2006 Czech Senate election in Prague 2
Candidate	Party	1st round		2nd round	
Candidate	Party	Votes	%	Votes	%
Daniela Filipiová	ODS	15 336	44,73	12 927	61,44
Taťana Fischerová	"Z"	4 959	14,46	8 113	38,55
Vlastimila Vrabcová	ČSSD	3 648	10,64	—	—
Tomáš Mikeska	SNK ED	2 901	8,46	—	—
Pavel Ambrož	KSČM	2 441	7,12	—	—
Ivan Rynda	SZ	1 936	5,64	—	—
Věra Chytilová	SRŠ	1 562	4,55	—	—
John Bok	NPP	548	1,59	—	—
Josef Heller	ODA	461	1,34	—	—
Václav Srb	KČ	272	0,79	—	—
Helena Kohoutová	„21“	154	0,44	—	—
Michal Simkanič	ČP	61	0,17	—	—

=== 2012 ===
2012 Czech Senate election in Prague 2
Candidate	Party	1st round		2nd round	
Candidate	Party	Votes	%	Votes	%
Libor Michálek	Pirates, KDU-ČSL, SZ	5 520	24,31	11 807	74,39
Stanislav Křeček	ČSSD	4 046	17,82	4 064	25,60
Zdeněk Zavřel	TOP 09, STAN	3 335	14,69	—	—
Milena Kozumplíková	ODS	3 317	14,61	—	—
Pavel Ambrož	KSČM	2 350	10,35	—	—
Jiří Payne	Svobodní	1518	6,68	—	—
Milan Hulík	ANO 2011	791	3,48	—	—
Olga Sedláčková	SNK ED	556	2,44	—	—
Jiří Hrdina	BPS	434	1,91	—	—
Václav Srb	KČ	319	1,40	—	—
Karel Berka	PP	250	1,10	—	—
Vladimír Dbalý	NÁR.SOC.	158	0,69	—	—
Martin Rejman	KONS	108	0,47	—	—

=== 2018 ===
2018 Czech Senate election in Prague 2
Candidate	Party	1st round		2nd round	
Candidate	Party	Votes	%	Votes	%
Marek Hilšer	MHS	15 045	44,45	11 903	79,75
Libor Michálek	Pirates, VIZE	5 272	15,57	3 022	20,24
Vladimír Kratina	ODS	3 964	11,71	—	—
Roman Kerekeš	ANO 2011	2 911	8,60	—	—
Ladislav Jakl	SPD	2 159	6,37	—	—
Ivan Gabal	Zelení	1 818	5,37	—	—
Vladislava Hujová	HPP	1 502	4,43	—	—
Vladimír Roškot	KSČM	939	2,77	—	—
Václav Srb	Monarchiste.cz	234	0,69	—	—

=== 2024 ===
2024 Czech Senate election in Prague 2
Candidate	Party	1st round		2nd round	
Candidate	Party	Votes	%	Votes	%
Miroslav Bárta	STAN, TOP 09	5 255	27,52	6 352	54,52
Marek Hilšer	MHS, Pirates	5 617	29,42	5 298	45,47
Eva Zažímalová	ODS	4 368	22,87	—	—
Eva Kislingerová	ANO 2011	3 437	18,00	—	—
Bronislav Poul	SOCDEM	415	2,17	—	—
