= Senate district 35 – Jablonec nad Nisou =

Electoral district in the Czech Republic

35 – Jablonec nad Nisou
- inline Senate district of the Czech Republic

- The Jablonec nad Nisou district on a map
- Senator: Lena Mlejnková; SLK
- Region: Liberec
- District: Jablonec nad Nisou; Semily
- Electorate: 110,851
- Area: 922.8 km²
- Last election: 2024
- Next election: 2030

Senate district 35 – Teplice is an electoral district of the Senate of the Czech Republic, which is formed by the entirety of the Jablonec nad Nisou District and parts of Semily District. From 2024, a SLK member Lena Mlejnková is representing the district.

== Senators ==
Year	Senator	Party
1996 (Note: Election for shortened four-year term)	František Vízek	ČSSD
2000	Soňa Paukrtová	4KOALICE
2006	Soňa Paukrtová	SOS
2012	Jaroslav Zeman	ODS
2018	Jaroslav Zeman	ODS
2024	Lena Mlejnková	SLK

== Election results ==
=== 1996 ===
1996 Czech Senate election in Jablonec nad Nisou
Candidate	Party	1st round		2nd round	
Candidate	Party	Votes	%	Votes	%
František Vízek	ČSSD	9 580	24,70	19 414	50,80
Karel Dyba	ODS	14 223	36,68	18 805	49,20
Miloš Šnytr	ODA	5 622	14,50	—	—
František Pešek	KSČM	4 031	10,39	—	—
Jaroslav Šafařík	ČSNS	2 276	5,87	—	—
Josef Koníček	SŽJ	1 651	4,26	—	—
Zdeněk Joukl	NEZ	1 110	2,86	—	—
Miroslav Janatka	D 92	288	0,74	—	—

=== 2000 ===
2000 Czech Senate election in Jablonec nad Nisou
Candidate	Party	1st round		2nd round	
Candidate	Party	Votes	%	Votes	%
Soňa Paukrtová	4KOALICE	6 367	17,51	11 096	51,38
Jiří Čeřovský	ODS	11 066	30,44	10 498	48,61
Ludmila Brynychová	KSČM	5 447	14,98	—	—
Jaroslava Syrovátková	Independent	5 257	14,46	—	—
František Vízek	ČSSD	4 796	13,19	—	—
Ivan Kracík	ČSNS	1 521	4,18	—	—
Zdeněk Joukl	NEZ	1 497	4,11	—	—
Pavel Kadaš	PA	391	1,07	—	—

=== 2006 ===
2006 Czech Senate election in Jablonec nad Nisou
Candidate	Party	1st round		2nd round	
Candidate	Party	Votes	%	Votes	%
Soňa Paukrtová	SOS	13 662	29,82	14 120	52,94
Jiří Čeřovský	ODS	16 783	36,63	12 549	47,05
Věra Picková	KSČM	5 367	11,71	—	—
Zbyněk Vobořil	Independent	4 624	10,09	—	—
Imrich Bugár	ČSSD	3 661	7,99	—	—
Karel Kolář	KSDO	942	2,05	—	—
Zdeněk Joukl	Koal_ČR	775	1,69	—	—

=== 2012 ===
2012 Czech Senate election in Jablonec nad Nisou
Candidate	Party	1st round		2nd round	
Candidate	Party	Votes	%	Votes	%
Jaroslav Zeman	ODS	8 043	21,41	14 003	63,62
Stanislav Eichler	ČSSD	5 838	15,54	8 236	36,37
František Pešek	KSČM	4 772	12,70	—	—
Soňa Paukrtová	STAN, SLK, TOP 09	4 406	11,73	—	—
Michael Vraný	KDU-ČSL	4 308	11,47	—	—
Pavel Žur	NBPLK	4 027	10,72	—	—
Josef Hausmann	Independent	3 702	9,85	—	—
Stanislav Pěnička	PSS	1 199	3,19	—	—
Miroslav Matěcha	SPOZ	919	2,44	—	—
František Vízek	NÁR.SOC.	336	0,89	—	—

=== 2018 ===
2018 Czech Senate election in Jablonec nad Nisou
Candidate	Party	1st round		2nd round	
Candidate	Party	Votes	%	Votes	%
Jaroslav Zeman	ODS	16 229	34,31	12 434	56,42
Michaela Tejmlová	SEN 21	10 505	22,21	9 601	43,57
Josef Chuchlík	ANO 2011	8 329	17,61	—	—
Pavel Žur	NBPLK	4 744	10,03	—	—
Michal Švarc	SPD	2 596	5,48	—	—
Jindřich Berounský	ČSSD	2 552	5,39	—	—
Šárka Kalvová	KSČM	2 334	4,98	—	—

=== 2024 ===
2024 Czech Senate election in Jablonec nad Nisou
Candidate	Party	1st round		2nd round	
Candidate	Party	Votes	%	Votes	%
Lena Mlejnková	SLK	8 491	24,44	14 299	62,92
Milan Kroupa	ANO 2011	9 189	26,45	8 424	37,07
Vít Němeček	ODS, KDU-ČSL, TOP 09	6 859	19,74	—	—
Michal Švarc	SPD, Tricolour	4 162	11,98	—	—
Michaela Tejmlová	SEN 21	3 442	9,90	—	—
Tomáš Vašíček	APB	2 593	7,46	—	—
