= Senate district 41 – Benešov =

Electoral district in the Czech Republic

41 – Benešov
- inline Senate district of the Czech Republic

- The Benešov district on a map
- Senator: Zdeněk Hraba; ODS
- Region: Central Bohemian
- District: Benešov; Prague-East; Prague-West
- Electorate: 123,814
- Area: 1,543.42 km²
- Last election: 2024
- Next election: 2030

Senate district 41 – Benešov is an electoral district of the Senate of the Czech Republic, which is formed by the entirety of the Mladá Boleslav District and parts of Prague-East and Prague-West districts. From 2018, a ODS nominee Zdeněk Hraba is representing the district.

== Senators ==
Year	Senator	Party
1996 (Note: Election for shortened four-year term)	Libuše Benešová	ODS
2000	Helena Rögnerová	4KOALICE
2006	Karel Šebek	ODS
2012	Luděk Jeništa	STAN
2018	Zdeněk Hraba	STAN
2024	Zdeněk Hraba	ODS

== Election results ==
=== 1996 ===
1996 Czech Senate election in Benešov
Candidate	Party	1st round		2nd round	
Candidate	Party	Votes	%	Votes	%
Libuše Benešová	ODS	17 112	46,12	21 541	60,88
Josef Dráb	ČSSD	7 435	20,04	13 839	39,12
Jan Minář	KSČM	4 892	13,18	—	—
Vladimír Šuman	ODA	4 846	13,06	—	—
Vlasta Chromá	Independent	2 821	7,60	—	—

=== 2000 ===
2000 Czech Senate election in Benešov
Candidate	Party	1st round		2nd round	
Candidate	Party	Votes	%	Votes	%
Helena Rögnerová	4KOALICE	19 273	48,39	24 532	74,50
Libuše Benešová	ODS	9 883	24,81	8 393	25,49
Zdeněk Seidl	ČSSD	5 608	14,08	—	—
Jan Minář	KSČM	4 121	10,34	—	—
Václav Lang	Independent	940	2,36	—	—

=== 2006 ===
2006 Czech Senate election in Benešov
Candidate	Party	1st round		2nd round	
Candidate	Party	Votes	%	Votes	%
Karel Šebek	ODS	17 739	33,48	14 493	61,13
Helena Rögnerová	VPM	10 362	19,56	9 215	38,86
Zdeněk Seidl	ČSSD	9 648	18,21	—	—
Milan Hoke	Independent	4 498	8,49	—	—
Jiří Kopsa	KSČM	3 642	6,87	—	—
Antonín Podzimek	KDU-ČSL	3 502	6,61	—	—
Eva Tylová	SZ	3 338	6,30	—	—
Miroslav Žirovnický	„21“	242	0,45	—	—

=== 2012 ===
2012 Czech Senate election in Benešov
Candidate	Party	1st round		2nd round	
Candidate	Party	Votes	%	Votes	%
Luděk Jeništa	STAN, TOP 09	6 198	16,19	9 918	55,05
Karel Šebek	ODS	7 223	18,87	8 096	44,97
Ivan Cinka	KSČM	5 543	14,48	—	—
Věra Kisová	ČSSD	5 127	13,39	—	—
Ivana Dobešová	ANO 2011	2 775	7,25	—	—
Petr Čuřík	Independent	2 675	6,99	—	—
Milan Vodička	Svobodní	2 306	6,02	—	—
Aleš Znamenáček	HNPD	2 289	5,98	—	—
Lenka Matoušková	Pirates	1 572	4,1	—	—
Petr Hannig	Suverenity	1 341	3,5	—	—
Alice Čečilová	VV	999	2,61	—	—
Alan Babický	NÁR.SOC.	218	0,56	—	—

=== 2018 ===
2018 Czech Senate election in Benešov
Candidate	Party	1st round		2nd round	
Candidate	Party	Votes	%	Votes	%
Zdeněk Hraba	STAN	11 094	20,93	10 636	60,95
Jiří Kozák	ODS	9 169	17,29	6 814	39,04
Jiří Švadlena	ANO	7 527	14,20	—	—
Petr Chaluš	Pirates	5 172	9,75	—	—
Terezie Radoměřská	TOP 09	4 766	8,99	—	—
Jan Borguľa	KDU-ČSL	3 591	6,77	—	—
Martin Šveda	Independent	3 222	6,07	—	—
Ivan Cinka	KSČM	2 870	5,41	—	—
Miroslav Křeček	SPD	2 667	5,03	—	—
Petr Petržílek	ČSSD	1 969	3,71	—	—
Aleš Hemer	Soukromníci	957	1,80	—	—

=== 2024 ===
2024 Czech Senate election in Benešov
Candidate	Party	1st round		2nd round	
Candidate	Party	Votes	%	Votes	%
Zdeněk Hraba	ODS, KONS, Monarchiste.cz, Svobodní	14 029	33,28	15 754	67,10
Helena Válková	ANO	11 058	26,23	7 722	32,89
Dominik Hašek	TOP 09	8 552	20,28	—	—
Andrea Švojgrová	Pirates	5 249	12,45	—	—
Roman Hořejší	SPD, Tricolour	2 125	5,04	—	—
Josef Roušal	ČSSD	1 137	2,69	—	—
