= Senate district 8 – Rokycany =

Electoral district in the Czech Republic

Coordinates: 49°51′39″N 13°26′21″E

8 – Rokycany
- inline Senate district of the Czech Republic

- The Rokycany district on a map
- Senator: Miroslav Kroc; STAN
- Region: Plzeň; Central Bohemian
- District: Rokycany; Plzeň-North; Plzeň-City; Beroun
- Electorate: 114144
- Area: 2,013.07 km²
- Last election: 2024
- Next election: 2030

Senate district 8 – Rokycany is an electoral district of the Senate of the Czech Republic, containing whole of the Rokycany District and parts of Plzeň-North, Plzeň-City and Beroun Districts. From 2024 onwards, Miroslav Kroc from STAN is representing the district.

== Senators ==
Year	Senator	Party
1996 (Note: Election for shortened four-year term)	František Jirava	ČSSD
2000	Luděk Sefzig	ODS
2006	Luděk Sefzig	ODS
2012	Milada Emmerová	ČSSD
2018	Pavel Karpíšek	ODS
2024	Miroslav Kroc	STAN

== Election results ==
=== 1996 ===
1996 Czech Senate election in Rokycany
Candidate	Party	1st round		2nd round	
Candidate	Party	Votes	%	Votes	%
František Jirava	ČSSD	9 518	28,20	18 163	55,60
Karel Novák	ODS	11 704	34,68	14 504	44,40
Josef Hlad	KSČM	5 896	17,47	—	—
Stanislav Rampas	ODA	3 046	9,02	—	—
Václav Beneda	ČSNS	1 751	5,19	—	—
Hana Lagová	SDS	560	1,66	—	—
Otakar Štajf	ČP	538	1,59	—	—
Jan Beneš	DEU	534	1,58	—	—
Karel Ferschmann	PB	206	0,61	—	—

=== 2000 ===
2000 Czech Senate election in Rokycany
Candidate	Party	1st round		2nd round	
Candidate	Party	Votes	%	Votes	%
Luděk Sefzig	ODS	7 333	22,15	15 199	60,76
Helena Suchá	KSČM	7 806	23,57	9 813	39,23
František Jirava	ČSSD	6 091	18,39	—	—
Jiří Holenda	4KOALICE	4 846	14,63	—	—
František Pillmann	AZSD	4 073	12,30	—	—
Jiří Vracovský	Independent	2 377	7,18	—	—
Jan Roj	UPE	579	1,74	—	—

=== 2006 ===
2006 Czech Senate election in Rokycany
Candidate	Party	1st round		2nd round	
Candidate	Party	Votes	%	Votes	%
Luděk Sefzig	ODS	15 834	37,65	14 212	66,13
Jan Mudra	KSČM	7 086	16,85	7 276	33,86
František Brožík	ČSSD	6 588	15,66	—	—
Tomáš Křiklán	US-DEU	6 213	14,77	—	—
František Pillmann	AZSD	2 847	6,77	—	—
Jiří Bendl	SZ	2 295	5,45	—	—
Ivo Kaplán	KDU-ČSL	1 189	2,82	—	—

=== 2012 ===
2012 Czech Senate election in Rokycany
Candidate	Party	1st round		2nd round	
Candidate	Party	Votes	%	Votes	%
Milada Emmerová	ČSSD	9 746	27,49	8 399	54,79
Jiří Valenta	KSČM	8 830	24,91	6 929	45,2
Luděk Sefzig	ODS	7 549	21,29	—	—
Jaroslav Lobkowicz	TOP 09, STAN	4 619	13,03	—	—
Stanislav Rampas	SNK ED	2 039	5,75	—	—
Rostislav Senjuk	SsČR	1 941	5,47	—	—
Jiří Janoušek	NÁR.SOC.	723	2,03	—	—

=== 2018 ===
2018 Czech Senate election in Rokycany
Candidate	Party	1st round		2nd round	
Candidate	Party	Votes	%	Votes	%
Pavel Karpíšek	ODS	12 694	28,55	11 120	68,38
Milada Emmerová	ČSSD	7 019	15,79	5 141	31,61
Lucie Groene	ANO 2011	6 767	15,22	—	—
Zdeněk Chýnovský	KSČM	5 360	12,05	—	—
Zdeněk Hess	Pirates	5 339	12,01	—	—
David Redl	SPD	4 372	9,83	—	—
Martin Uhlíř	TOP 09, LES	2 374	5,34	—	—
Michal Drabík	MS Pirates	524	1,17	—	—

=== 2024 ===
2024 Czech Senate election in Rokycany
Candidate	Party	1st round		2nd round	
Candidate	Party	Votes	%	Votes	%
Miroslav Kroc	STAN	8 544	24,97	10 782	56,12
Petr Vanka	ANO 2011	12 126	35,44	8 427	43,87
Pavel Karpíšek	ODS, Koruna Česká, TOP 09, Občané patrioti	6 921	20,23	—	—
Tomáš Rada	KDU-ČSL, PRO PLZEŇ, OSVČ	3 778	11,04	—	—
Jaromír Pěnkava	SPD, Tricolour	2 842	8,30	—	—
