= Senate district 11 – Domažlice =

Electoral district in the Czech Republic

Coordinates: 49°17′12″N 13°08′52″E

11 – Domažlice
- inline Senate district of the Czech Republic

- The Domažlice district on a map
- Senator: Jan Látka; ANO 2011
- Region: Plzeň
- District: Domažlice; Klatovy
- Electorate: 102991
- Area: 2,598.31 km²
- Last election: 2024
- Next election: 2030

Senate district 11 – Domažlice is an electoral district of the Senate of the Czech Republic, which contains the whole of the Domažlice District and part of the Klatovy District. From 2024, Jan Látka of ANO 2011 is representing the district.

== Senators ==
Year	Senator	Party
1996 (Note: Election for shortened four-year term)	Petr Smutný	ČSSD
2000	Petr Smutný	ČSSD
2006	Jiřina Rippelová	ČSSD
2012	Jan Látka	ČSSD
2018	Vladislav Vilímec	ODS
2024	Jan Látka	ANO 2011

== Election results ==
=== 1996 ===
1996 Czech Senate election in Domažlice
Candidate	Party	1st round		2nd round	
Candidate	Party	Votes	%	Votes	%
Petr Smutný	ČSSD	7 571	23,10	15 341	50,32
Ivan Bečvář	ODS	12 019	36,67	15 144	49,68
Václav Jung	KSČM	5 522	16,85	—	—
Jaroslav Lobkowicz	KDU-ČSL	4 589	14,00	—	—
Josef Sedláček	SŽJ	2 275	6,94	—	—
Marie Haisová	SZ	801	2,44	—	—

=== 2000 ===
2000 Czech Senate election in Domažlice
Candidate	Party	1st round		2nd round	
Candidate	Party	Votes	%	Votes	%
Petr Smutný	ČSSD	7 988	23,68	11 084	56,09
Jaroslav Komora	Independent	6 282	18,62	8 675	43,90
Pavel Faschingbauer	ODS	6 078	18,01	—	—
Jaroslav Dolejší	KSČM	5 278	15,64	—	—
Ivan Petrů	4KOALICE	3 821	11,32	—	—
Tomislav Vodička	Independent	3 660	10,85	—	—
Vladimír Šimčík	UPE	391	1,15	—	—
Karel Jachan	PA	129	0,38	—	—
Jaroslav Fridrich	ČSNS	104	0,30	—	—

=== 2006 ===
2006 Czech Senate election in Domažlice
Candidate	Party	1st round		2nd round	
Candidate	Party	Votes	%	Votes	%
Jiřina Rippelová	ČSSD	10 854	24,93	15 227	57,84
Eliska Haskova Coolidge	ODS	11 393	26,17	11 097	42,15
Michal Janek	Independent	8 689	19,96	—	—
Věstislav Křenek	KSČM	5 829	13,39	—	—
Jaroslav Lobkowicz	KDU-ČSL	4 772	10,96	—	—
Stanislav Volák	US-DEU	1 995	4,58	—	—

=== 2012 ===
2012 Czech Senate election in Domažlice
Candidate	Party	1st round		2nd round	
Candidate	Party	Votes	%	Votes	%
Jan Látka	ČSSD	8 640	25,39	12 128	51,56
Rudolf Salvetr	ODS	7 521	22,10	11 391	48,43
Jan Rejfek	KSČM	6 176	18,15	—	—
Jiřina Rippelová	SPOZ	5 984	17,58	—	—
Michal Janek	TOP 09, STAN	4 957	14,56	—	—
Ivan Šterzl	NÁR.SOC.	744	2,18	—	—

=== 2018 ===
2018 Czech Senate election in Domažlice
Candidate	Party	1st round		2nd round	
Candidate	Party	Votes	%	Votes	%
Vladislav Vilímec	ODS	9 142	21,49	9 408	52,59
Jan Látka	ČSSD	9 136	21,47	8 478	47,40
Michal Janek	TOP 09	6 777	15,93	—	—
Miroslav Vokáč	ANO 2011	6 233	14,65	—	—
Viktor Krutina	Pirates	5 198	12,21	—	—
Josef Švarcbek	KSČM	2 975	6,99	—	—
Milan Obdržálek	SPD	2 509	5,89	—	—
Miroslav Timura	ČS	567	1,33	—	—

=== 2024 ===
2024 Czech Senate election in Domažlice
Candidate	Party	1st round		2nd round	
Candidate	Party	Votes	%	Votes	%
Jan Látka	ANO 2011	8 259	28,96	8 555	55,00
Vladislav Vilímec	ODS	4 478	15,70	6 999	44,99
Libor Picka	STAN	2 734	9,58	—	—
Stanislav Antoš	KDU-ČSL, PRO PLZEŇ, OSVČ	2 660	9,33	—	—
Ján Ridzoň	SPD, Tricolour	2 616	9,17	—	—
Robert Baxa	Independent	2 379	8,34	—	—
Ivan Maštálka	KSČM	2 192	7,68	—	—
Jan Janda	Pirates	1 679	5,88	—	—
Václav Sladký	SOCDEM	1 512	5,30	—	—
