= Senate district 5 – Chomutov =

Electoral district in the Czech Republic

Coordinates: 50°24′56″N 13°15′19″E

5 – Chomutov
- inline Senate district of the Czech Republic

- The Chomutov district on a map
- Senator: Přemysl Rabas; SEN 21
- Region: Ústí nad Labem
- District: Chomutov
- Electorate: 98578
- Area: 935.30 km²
- Last election: 2024
- Next election: 2030

Senate district 5 – Chomutov is an electoral district of the Senate of the Czech Republic, centered around the city of Chomutov and corresponding to the of Chomutov District. Since 2018, Přemysl Rabas, a SEN 21 nominee, is Senator for the district.

== Senators ==
Year	Senator	Party
1996 (Note: Election for shortened four-year term)	Ladislav Drlý	KSČM
2000	Alexandr Novák	ODS
2006	Petr Skála	Independent
2007	Václav Homolka	KSČM
2012	Václav Homolka	KSČM
2018	Přemysl Rabas	SEN 21
2024	Přemysl Rabas	SEN 21

== Election results ==
=== 1996 ===
1996 Czech Senate election in Chomutov
Candidate	Party	1st round		2nd round	
Candidate	Party	Votes	%	Votes	%
Ladislav Drlý	KSČM	4 182	22,00	11 132	56,03
Jiří Polanský	ODS	5 849	30,77	8 736	43,97
Jaroslav Krákora	SZ	3 481	18,31	—	—
Josef Vejvoda	ČSSD	3 055	16,07	—	—
Vladimír Novotný	ODA	1 602	8,43	—	—
Marta Karlíčková	PA	334	1,76	—	—
Jiří Cmár	SPŽRČR	304	1,60	—	—
Alexej Pludek	KSČ	202	1,06	—	—
KSČM win (new seat)					

=== 2000 ===
2000 Czech Senate election in Chomutov
Candidate	Party	1st round		2nd round	
Candidate	Party	Votes	%	Votes	%
Alexandr Novák	ODS	5 343	23,88	9 943	53,58
Ladislav Drlý	KSČM	7 235	32,34	8 613	46,41
Jiří Leitner	NEZ	3 664	16,37	—	—
Bohumil Bocian	ČSSD	3 545	15,84	—	—
Zdislava Binterová	US (Note: Part of 4KOALICE coalition)	2 583	11,54	—	—
ODS gain from KSČM					

=== 2006 ===
2006 Czech Senate election in Chomutov
Candidate	Party	1st round		2nd round	
Candidate	Party	Votes	%	Votes	%
Petr Skála	Independent	8 263	27,21	14 331	73,38
Ivana Řápková	ODS	8 056	26,53	5 198	26,63
Václav Homolka	KSČM	4 205	13,85	—	—
Marie Benešová	ČSSD	3 864	12,72	—	—
Ivan Varga	„21“	1 781	5,86	—	—
Milan Beran	NEZ	1 484	4,88	—	—
Džamila Stehlíková	SZ	1 116	3,67	—	—
Ondřej Mikš	NEZ/DEM	765	2,52	—	—
František Pěchota	US-DEU	478	1,57	—	—
Zdeněk Jánský	HS	478	1,57	—	—
Independent gain from ODS					

=== 2007 ===
Petr Skála, who was elected senator in 2006, resigned just three months after the election due to medical problems.

2007 Czech Senate by-elections in Chomutov
Candidate	Party	1st round		2nd round	
Candidate	Party	Votes	%	Votes	%
Václav Homolka	KSČM	2 529	23,28	5 373	55,32
Jan Řehák	ODS	2 760	25,41	4 338	44,67
Jan Mareš	ČSSD	2 510	23,11	—	—
Josef Märc	SZ	1 101	10,13	—	—
Milan Beran	NEZ	875	8,05	—	—
Milan Doležal	Independent	499	4,59	—	—
Antonín Drbohlav	Independent	396	3,64	—	—
František Lehotský	SDŽ	101	0,93	—	—
Zdeněk Jánský	HS	89	0,81	—	—
KSČM gain from Independent					

=== 2012 ===
2012 Czech Senate election in Chomutov
Candidate	Party	1st round		2nd round	
Candidate	Party	Votes	%	Votes	%
Václav Homolka	KSČM	6 815	24,62	6 999	59,62
Rudolf Kozák	ČSSD	4 646	16,78	4 740	40,37
Přemysl Rabas	SZ (Note: In a coalition with KDU-ČSL and HNHRM)	4 503	16,27	—	—
Jan Micka	S.cz	2 524	9,12	—	—
Jiří Binter	ODS	2 108	7,61	—	—
Milada Benešová	ANO	1 923	6,94	—	—
Josef Mašek	TOP 09 (Note: In a coalition with STAN)	1 711	6,18	—	—
Marie Kindermannová	NO!	1 545	5,58	—	—
Václav Netolický	SBB	833	3,01	—	—
Jiří Cinger	NÁR.SOC.	530	1,91	—	—
Josef Suchý	VV	388	1,4	—	—
Bedřich Suldovský	SsČR	146	0,52	—	—
KSČM hold					

=== 2018 ===
2018 Czech Senate election in Chomutov
Candidate	Party	1st round		2nd round	
Candidate	Party	Votes	%	Votes	%
Přemysl Rabas	SEN 21	10 626	33,51	7 603	62,52
Martina Chodacká	ANO	6 770	21,35	4 556	37,47
Jaroslav Zahrádka	ODS	3 515	11,08	—	—
Václav Homolka	KSČM	3 065	9,66	—	—
Roman Brand	Independent	2 612	8,23	—	—
Jaroslav Krákora	ČSSD	1 637	5,16	—	—
Elvíra Hahnová	SPD	1 614	5,09	—	—
Ota Staňo	PRO Zdraví	1 282	4,04	—	—
Petr Jano	Independent	581	1,83	—	—
SEN 21 gain from KSČM					

=== 2024 ===
2024 Czech Senate election in Chomutov
Candidate	Party	1st round		2nd round	
Candidate	Party	Votes	%	Votes	%
Přemysl Rabas	SEN 21 (Note: Supported by Pirates, LES and Greens)	4 480	20,73	6 862	52,95
Jaroslav Komínek	KSČM (Note: In a coalition with ČSNS and SOCDEM)	5 043	23,33	6 097	47,04
Jiří Kulhánek	ODS (Note: Part of SPOLU coalition)	4 221	19,53	—	—
Roman Brand	LS	3 093	14,06	—	—
Jiří Smetana	Tricolour (Note: In a coalition with SPD, supported by Svobodní and PRO)	2 269	10,49	—	—
Štefan Drozd	STAN	2 046	9,46	—	—
Elvíra Hahnová	ČSSD	513	2,37	—	—
SEN 21 hold					
