= Senate district 50 – Svitavy =

Electoral district in the Czech Republic

50 – Svitavy
- inline Senate district of the Czech Republic

- The Svitavy district on a map
- Senator: David Šimek; KDU-ČSL
- Region: Pardubice
- District: Svitavy; Chrudim; Ústí nad Orlicí
- Last election: 2024
- Next election: 2030

Senate district 50 – Svitavy is an electoral district of the Senate of the Czech Republic, located in part of the Svitavy District, part of the Chrudim District, and the western part of the Ústí nad Orlicí District. Since 2024, the Senator for the district is David Šimek.

== Senators ==
Year	Senator	Party
1996	Jiří Brýdl	KDU-ČSL
2000	Jiří Brýdl	4KOALICE
2006	Václav Koukal	KDU-ČSL
2012	Radko Martínek	ČSSD
2018	Michal Kortyš	ODS
2024	David Šimek	KDU-ČSL

== Election results ==
=== 1996 ===
1996 Czech Senate election in Svitavy
Candidate	Party	1st round		2nd round	
Candidate	Party	Votes	%	Votes	%
Jiří Brýdl	KDU-ČSL	7 852	24,54	13 967	57,77
František Zeman	ODS	10 033	31,35	10 208	42,23
Augustin Beneš	ČSSD	7 767	24,27	—	—
Lidmila Kružíková	KSČM	4 563	14,26	—	—
Pavel Bobek	ODA	1 787	5,58	—	—

=== 2000 ===
2000 Czech Senate election in Svitavy
Candidate	Party	1st round		2nd round	
Candidate	Party	Votes	%	Votes	%
Jiří Brýdl	4KOALICE	13 950	44,70	14 045	66,82
Michal Kraus	ČSSD	6 862	21,98	6 973	33,17
Jitka Gruntová	KSČM	5 909	18,93	—	—
Jiří Brusenbauch	ODS	4 487	14,37	—	—

=== 2006 ===
2006 Czech Senate election in Svitavy
Candidate	Party	1st round		2nd round	
Candidate	Party	Votes	%	Votes	%
Václav Koukal	KDU-ČSL	11 939	28,66	11 173	53,42
Miroslav Popelka	ODS	15 851	38,05	9 740	46,57
Jiří Havel	ČSSD	7 157	17,18	—	—
Miroslav Krejčí	KSČM	6 702	16,09	—	—

=== 2012 ===
2012 Czech Senate election in Svitavy
Candidate	Party	1st round		2nd round	
Candidate	Party	Votes	%	Votes	%
Radko Martínek	ČSSD	11 138	32,36	10 394	69,71
Zuzka Bebarová-Rujbrová	KSČM	6 424	18,66	4 515	30,28
Vojtěch Stříteský	KDU-ČSL	6 251	18,16	—	—
Harald Čadílek	ODS	4 897	14,21	—	—
Hana Štěpánová	STAN, TOP 09	2 893	8,40	—	—
Stanislav Vodička	SsČR	2 818	8,18	—	—

=== 2018 ===
2018 Czech Senate election in Svitavy
Candidate	Party	1st round		2nd round	
Candidate	Party	Votes	%	Votes	%
Michal Kortyš	ODS	9 693	24,73	9 024	62,76
Pavel Havíř	ČSSD	8 136	20,76	5 354	37,23
Bohuslav Fliedr	STAN, KDU-ČSL	5 357	13,67	—	—
Jiří Krátký	Pirates	4 908	12,52	—	—
Miroslav Šafář	Rozumní	3 719	9,49	—	—
Milan Mňuk	KSČM	3 368	8,59	—	—
Josef Krpálek	SPD	2 234	5,70	—	—
Jaroslav Novák	Patriots ČR	902	2,30	—	—
Sylor Richard Andrle	Monarchiste.cz	864	2,20	—	—

=== 2024 ===
2024 Czech Senate election in Svitavy
Candidate	Party	1st round		2nd round	
Candidate	Party	Votes	%	Votes	%
David Šimek	KDU-ČSL, NK	7 439	26,29	7 540	57,36
Michal Kortyš	ODS	6 658	23,53	5 604	42,63
Pavel Havíř	SOCDEM, SproK	5 411	19,12	—	—
Petr Štěpánek	Tricolour, SPD	3 762	13,29	—	—
Pavel Severa	Independent	3 014	10,65	—	—
Hynek Blaško	SpV	1 105	3,90	—	—
Milena Míčová	JaSaN	897	3,17	—	—
