= Senate district 53 – Třebíč =

Electoral district in the Czech Republic

53 – Třebíč
- inline Senate district of the Czech Republic

- The Třebíč district on a map
- Senator: Hana Žáková; STAN
- Region: Vysočina
- District: Třebíč
- Last election: 2024
- Next election: 2030

Senate district 53 – Třebíč is an electoral district of the Senate of the Czech Republic, located in the entirety of the Třebíč District. Since 2018, the Senator for the district is Hana Žáková.

== Senators ==
Year	Senator	Party
1996	Pavel Heřman	DEU
2000	Pavel Janata	4KOALICE
2006	Vítězslav Jonáš	ODS
2012	František Bublan	ČSSD
2018	Hana Žáková	STAN
2024	Hana Žáková	STAN

== Election results ==
=== 1996 ===
1996 Czech Senate election in Třebíč
Candidate	Party	1st round		2nd round	
Candidate	Party	Votes	%	Votes	%
Pavel Heřman	DEU	6 891	21,17	14 656	59,66
Petr Hort	ODS	9 379	28,81	9 909	40,34
Ivo Novotný	KSČM	5 913	18,16	—	—
Vojtěch Vymětal	ČSSD	5 679	17,44	—	—
Ludmila Šilhavá	SŽJ	1 836	5,64	—	—
Karel Müller	ODA	1 604	4,93	—	—
Miloslav Vostrý	Independent	712	2,19	—	—
Lubomír Kukla	MSLK_96	543	1,67	—	—

=== 2000 ===
2000 Czech Senate election in Třebíč
Candidate	Party	1st round		2nd round	
Candidate	Party	Votes	%	Votes	%
Pavel Janata	4KOALICE	10 314	33,82	16 611	65,08
Pavel Kováčik	KSČM	7 608	24,94	8 912	34,91
Jiří Mužík	ODS	6 132	20,10	—	—
Miloš Mašek	ČSSD	4 753	15,58	—	—
Ludmila Kramolišová	CAO	1 687	5,53	—	—

=== 2006 ===
2006 Czech Senate election in Třebíč
Candidate	Party	1st round		2nd round	
Candidate	Party	Votes	%	Votes	%
Vítězslav Jonáš	ODS	11 869	29,03	12 629	52,89
Josef Zahradníček	KSČM	10 505	25,70	11 246	47,10
Pavel Janata	KDU-ČSL	7 641	18,69	—	—
Miloš Mašek	ČSSD	7 214	17,65	—	—
Hana Houzarová	SZ	3 175	7,76	—	—
Petr Hobl	ODA	468	1,14	—	—

=== 2012 ===
2012 Czech Senate election in Třebíč
Candidate	Party	1st round		2nd round	
Candidate	Party	Votes	%	Votes	%
František Bublan	ČSSD	9 089	27,40	10 967	58,10
Josef Zahradníček	KSČM	8 945	26,97	7 909	41,89
Vítězslav Jonáš	ODS	5 784	17,44	—	—
Josef Herbrych	KDU-ČSL	4 884	14,72	—	—
Vlastimil Bařinka	STAN	4 460	13,44	—	—

=== 2018 ===
2018 Czech Senate election in Třebíč
Candidate	Party	1st round		2nd round	
Candidate	Party	Votes	%	Votes	%
Hana Žáková	STAN	11 333	28,49	13 237	77,46
Miroslav Michálek	ANO 2011	5 875	14,77	3 850	22,53
Michal Šalomoun	Pirates	5 412	13,60	—	—
Marie Dudíková	KDU-ČSL	5 306	13,34	—	—
Marek Nevoral	KSČM	3 986	10,02	—	—
Naděžda Dobešová	ČSSD	3 090	7,77	—	—
Stanislav Zíma	Independent	1 957	4,92	—	—
Petr Paul	SPD	1 818	4,57	—	—
Vladimír Kotek	Rozumní	988	2,48	—	—

=== 2024 ===
2024 Czech Senate election in Třebíč
Candidate	Party	1st round		2nd round	
Candidate	Party	Votes	%	Votes	%
Hana Žáková	STAN	12 178	41,22	10 424	56,22
Drahoslav Ryba	ANO 2011	9 163	31,01	8 116	43,77
Zdeněk Ryšavý	SOCDEM	2 602	8,80	—	—
Jaroslav Turánek	Swiss Democracy	2 022	6,84	—	—
Václav Lhotský	SPD, Tricolour	1 653	5,59	—	—
Petr Chňoupek	MZH	1 170	3,96	—	—
Luděk Růžička	MY HOMELAND ČMS	752	2,54	—	—
