= Senate district 29 – Litoměřice =

Electoral district in the Czech Republic

Coordinates: 50°25′46″N 14°10′31″E

29 – Litoměřice
- inline Senate district of the Czech Republic

- The Litoměřice district on a map
- Senator: Ondřej Štěrba; ANO 2011
- Region: Ústí nad Labem; Central Bohemia
- District: Litoměřice; Kladno
- Electorate: 116,595
- Area: 1,302.16 km²
- Last election: 2024
- Next election: 2030

Senate district 29 – Litoměřice is an electoral district of the Senate of the Czech Republic, which is located in parts of the Kladno and Litoměřice districts. From 2024, an ANO 2011 member Ondřej Štěrba is representing the district.

== Senators ==
Year	Senator	Party
1996 (Note: Election for shortened four-year term)	Karel Burda	ODS
2000	Zdeněk Bárta	4KOALICE
2006	Alexandr Vondra	ODS
2012	Hassan Mezian	ČSSD
2018	Ladislav Chlupáč	ODS
2024	Ondřej Štěrba	ANO

== Election results ==
=== 1996 ===
1996 Czech Senate election in Litoměřice
Candidate	Party	1st round		2nd round	
Candidate	Party	Votes	%	Votes	%
Karel Burda	ODS	15 600	41,93	21 798	60,60
Jiřina Švorcová	KSČM	9 335	25,09	14 171	39,40
Josef Pol	ČSSD	7 405	19,90	—	—
Petr Brzák	ODA	2 107	5,66	—	—
Karla Barková	DEU	1 783	4,79	—	—
Radomír Novák	MDS	977	2,63	—	—

=== 2000 ===
2000 Czech Senate election in Litoměřice
Candidate	Party	1st round		2nd round	
Candidate	Party	Votes	%	Votes	%
Zdeněk Bárta	4KOALICE	12 702	35,60	19 104	66,91
Pavel Pospíšek	KSČM	8 606	24,12	9 447	33,08
Karel Burda	ODS	7 306	20,47	—	—
Robert Kopecký	ČSSD	7 062	19,79	—	—

=== 2006 ===
2006 Czech Senate election in Litoměřice
Candidate	Party	1st round		2nd round	
Candidate	Party	Votes	%	Votes	%
Alexandr Vondra	ODS	16 358	35,74	15 696	58,59
Robert Kopecký	ČSSD	8 214	17,94	11 093	41,40
Zdeněk Dušek	KSČM	7 336	16,02	—	—
Květa Jeriová	SNK ED	6 244	13,64	—	—
Zdeněk Bárta	KDU-ČSL, SZ	3 950	8,63	—	—
Luboš Vrtilka	NEZ/DEM	1 633	3,56	—	—
Jiří Jelen	US-DEU	1 537	3,35	—	—
Anděla Dvořáková	„21“	495	1,08	—	—

=== 2012 ===
2012 Czech Senate election in Litoměřice
Candidate	Party	1st round		2nd round	
Candidate	Party	Votes	%	Votes	%
Hassan Mezian	ČSSD	8 595	22,37	10 467	52,56
Jitka Sachetová	KSČM	9 422	24,53	9 447	47,43
Alexandr Vondra	ODS	6 718	17,49	—	—
Stanislav Berkovec	TOP 09, STAN	3 980	10,36	—	—
Richard Hartmann	Svobodní	2 903	7,55	—	—
Jiří Šlégr	NÁR.SOC.	2 173	5,65	—	—
Ivan Přikryl	S.cz	1 798	4,68	—	—
Vladimír Říha	KDU-ČSL, SZ, HNHRM	1 391	3,62	—	—
Tomáš Jarolím	VV	765	1,99	—	—
František Malý	SBB	660	1,71	—	—

=== 2018 ===
2018 Czech Senate election in Litoměřice
Candidate	Party	1st round		2nd round	
Candidate	Party	Votes	%	Votes	%
Ladislav Chlupáč	ODS	11 432	24,50	10 930	56,40
Ondřej Štěrba	ANO 2011	9 113	19,53	8 446	43,59
Miroslav Jiránek	PRO Zdraví	6 028	12,92	—	—
Libor Uhlík	SEN 21	5 472	11,72	—	—
Josef Šenfeld	KSČM	5 261	11,27	—	—
Josef Dobeš	Independent	3 738	8,01	—	—
David Rath	ČS	2 323	4,97	—	—
František Novotný	SPD	1 939	4,15	—	—
Jan Vondrouš	NE-VOLIM.CZ	1 346	2,88	—	—

=== 2024 ===
2024 Czech Senate election in Litoměřice
Candidate	Party	1st round		2nd round	
Candidate	Party	Votes	%	Votes	%
Ondřej Štěrba	ANO 2011	13 269	37,87	12 435	63,21
Ladislav Chlupáč	ODS, KDU-ČSL, TOP 09	5 546	15,83	7 235	36,78
Petr Liška	STAN	4 820	13,75	—	—
Miroslav Jiránek	Pirates	3 749	10,70	—	—
Jan Skalický	ČSNS, KSČM, SD-SN	2 576	7,35	—	—
Martin Kratochvíl	Svobodní	2 486	7,09	—	—
Ilja Baudyš	SPD, Tricolour	2 214	6,32	—	—
Vladimír Vlk	ČSSD	370	1,05	—	—
