= Senate district 71 – Ostrava-City =

Electoral district in the Czech Republic

71 – Ostrava-City
- inline Senate district of the Czech Republic

- The Ostrava-City district on a map
- Senator: Martin Bednář; ANO 2011
- Region: Moravian-Silesian
- District: Ostrava-City
- Last election: 2024
- Next election: 2030

Senate district 71 – Ostrava-City is an electoral district of the Senate of the Czech Republic, located in part of the Ostrava-City District. Since 2024, the Senator for the district has been Martin Bednář of ANO 2011.

== Senators ==
Year	Senator	Party
1996	Jan Zapletal	ČSSD
2000	Milan Balabán	ODS
2006	Otakar Veřovský	ČSSD
2012	Leopold Sulovský	Ostravak
2018	Leopold Sulovský	Ostravak
2024	Martin Bednář	ANO

== Election results ==
=== 1996 ===
1996 Czech Senate election in Ostrava-City
Candidate	Party	1st round		2nd round	
Candidate	Party	Votes	%	Votes	%
Jan Zapletal	ČSSD	5 912	24,85	12 986	52,69
Ladislav Talavašek	ODS	9 765	41,04	11 659	47,31
Ladislav Adamec	KSČM	3 844	16,16	—	—
Radim Uzel	SZ	1 873	7,87	—	—
Zbyněk Matýsek	ODA	1 357	5,70	—	—
Jiří Sprušil	PA	1 043	4,38	—	—

=== 2000 ===
2000 Czech Senate election in Ostrava-City
Candidate	Party	1st round		2nd round	
Candidate	Party	Votes	%	Votes	%
Milan Balabán	ODS	6 949	25,82	10 317	57,53
Růžena Šarišská	KSČM	7 690	28,58	7 616	42,46
Jaroslav Slaný	4KOALICE	4 822	17,92	—	—
Jan Zapletal	ČSSD	4 753	17,66	—	—
Jaroslav Suchánek	NEZ	1 892	7,03	—	—
František Kunčík	SŽJ	799	2,96	—	—

=== 2006 ===
2006 Czech Senate election in Ostrava-City
Candidate	Party	1st round		2nd round	
Candidate	Party	Votes	%	Votes	%
Otakar Veřovský	ČSSD	7 426	29,79	8 824	52,98
Milan Balabán	ODS	8 345	33,48	7 830	47,01
Karel Gavenda	KSČM	4 259	17,09	—	—
Pavla Topolánková	„21“	2 401	9,63	—	—
Karel Szopa	SZ	1 114	4,47	—	—
Jan Půček	KDU-ČSL	983	3,94	—	—
Jana Volfová	NEZ/DEM	393	1,57	—	—

=== 2012 ===
2012 Czech Senate election in Ostrava-City
Candidate	Party	1st round		2nd round	
Candidate	Party	Votes	%	Votes	%
Leopold Sulovský	Ostravak	8 364	31,75	9 232	58,52
Karel Sibinský	ČSSD	8 297	31,49	6 543	41,47
Leo Luzar	KSČM	3 979	15,10	—	—
Dagmar Molendová	ODS	2 786	10,57	—	—
Růžena Sarišská	KSČ	1 800	6,83	—	—
Petr Lachnit	SPOZ	691	2,62	—	—
Radoslav Štědroň	SP	424	1,60	—	—

=== 2018 ===
2018 Czech Senate election in Ostrava-City
Candidate	Party	1st round		2nd round	
Candidate	Party	Votes	%	Votes	%
Leopold Sulovský	Ostravak	6 178	24,82	4 906	59,89
Ivo Gondek	ANO	4 775	19,19	3 285	40,10
Zdenka Němečková Crkvenjaš	Independent	3 779	15,18	—	—
Martin Tomášek	Pirates	3 149	12,65	—	—
René Číp	KSČM	2 024	8,13	—	—
Pynelopi Valsamisová	SPD	1 920	7,71	—	—
Jiří Paroubek	Independent	1 719	6,90	—	—
Martin Konvička	NEZ	1 061	4,26	—	—
Radoslav Štědroň	SSPD-SP	277	1,11	—	—

=== 2024 ===
2024 Czech Senate election in Ostrava-město
Candidate	Party	Votes	%
Martin Bednář	ANO	11 311	51,84
Leopold Sulovský	Ostravak	4 425	20,28
Leo Luzar	KSČM, ČSNS, SD-SN	2 289	10,49
Liana Janáčková	Svobodní	2 167	9,93
Marie Malcharová	SPD, Tricolour	1 219	5,58
Štefan Režný	ReMeK	268	1,22
Radoslav Štědroň	Swiss Democracy	136	0,62
