= Senate district 65 – Šumperk =

Electoral district in the Czech Republic

65 – Šumperk
- inline Senate district of the Czech Republic

- The Šumperk district on a map
- Senator: Stanislav Balík; Independent
- Region: Olomouc
- District: Šumperk; Jeseník
- Last election: 2024
- Next election: 2030

Senate district 65 – Šumperk is an electoral district of the Senate of the Czech Republic, consisting of parts of the Šumperk District, and the entire Jeseník District. Since 2024, the Senator for the district has been an independent, Stanislav Balík.

== Senators ==
Year	Senator	Party
1996	Václav Reitinger	ČSSD
2000	Adolf Jílek	KDU-ČSL
2006	Adolf Jílek	KDU-ČSL
2012	Zdeněk Brož	KDU-ČSL
2018	Miroslav Adámek	ANO 2011
2024	Stanislav Balík	Independent

== Election results ==
=== 1996 ===
1996 Czech Senate election in Šumperk
Candidate	Party	1st round		2nd round	
Candidate	Party	Votes	%	Votes	%
Václav Reitinger	ČSSD	5 575	19.71	15 101	54.52
Přemysl Michálek	ODS	7 231	25.56	12 596	45.48
František Merta	KSČM	5 153	18.22	—	—
Petr Košacký	ODA	4 197	14.84	—	—
Josef Sedláček	Independent	2 970	10.50	—	—
Jiří Veber	ČSNS	1 470	5.20	—	—
Jiří Kvapil	MSLK_96	773	2.73	—	—
Milan Mátl	SZ	412	1.46	—	—
Milan Žežula	CAO	276	0.98	—	—
Josef Singer	DEU	232	0.82	—	—

=== 2000 ===
2000 Czech Senate election in Šumperk
Candidate	Party	1st round		2nd round	
Candidate	Party	Votes	%	Votes	%
Adolf Jílek	4KOALICE	8 039	28.93	8 539	58.75
Petr Krill	ODS	6 787	24.42	5 995	41.24
Jiří Suma	KSČM	6 262	22.53	—	—
Jiří Krátký	ČSSD	4 977	17.91	—	—
Václav Reitinger	Independent	1 722	6.19	—	—

=== 2006 ===
2006 Czech Senate election in Šumperk
Candidate	Party	1st round		2nd round	
Candidate	Party	Votes	%	Votes	%
Adolf Jílek	KDU-ČSL	8 858	24.32	8 473	58.24
Zdeněk Zerzáň	ODS	8 589	23.58	6 073	41.75
Zdeněk Muroň	ČSSD	7 686	21.10	—	—
Josef Janíček	KSČM	6 505	17.86	—	—
Jindřich Němčík	NV	4 783	13.13	—	—

=== 2012 ===
2012 Czech Senate election in Šumperk
Candidate	Party	1st round		2nd round	
Candidate	Party	Votes	%	Votes	%
Zdeněk Brož	KDU-ČSL, NV	7 578	25.51	10 271	55.52
Miloslav Vlček	ČSSD	6 746	22.71	8 227	44.47
František Mencner	KSČM	5 725	19.27	—	—
Petr Procházka	ODS	4 483	15.09	—	—
Jan Kubíček	Independent	2 703	9.1	—	—
Jana Němečková	STAN, TOP 09	1 833	6.17	—	—
Vilém Bruk	NÁR.SOC.	396	1.33	—	—
Jiří Novák	ČS	238	0.8	—	—

=== 2018 ===
2018 Czech Senate election in Šumperk
Candidate	Party	1st round		2nd round	
Candidate	Party	Votes	%	Votes	%
Miroslav Adámek	ANO 2011	10 983	29.21	9 982	60.55
Zdeněk Brož	KDU-ČSL, NV	7 695	20.46	6 501	39.44
Josef Ťulpík	ODS	6 164	16.39	—	—
Dana Galuszková	ČSSD	5 828	15.50	—	—
Tomáš Hauzner	SPD	4 280	11.38	—	—
Vladislav Rulíšek	KSČM	2 644	7.03	—	—

=== 2024 ===
2024 Czech Senate election in Šumperk
Candidate	Party	1st round		2nd round	
Candidate	Party	Votes	%	Votes	%
Stanislav Balík	Independent	11 032	44.38	9 812	54.25
Miroslav Adámek	ANO 2011	11 991	48.24	8 274	45.74
Vladimír Hošek	Svobodní	1 831	7.36	—	—
