= Senate district 62 – Prostějov =

Electoral district in the Czech Republic

62 – Prostějov
- inline Senate district of the Czech Republic

- The Prostějov district on a map
- Senator: František Jura; ANO 2011
- Region: Olomouc
- District: Prostějov; Přerov
- Last election: 2024
- Next election: 2030

Senate district 62 – Prostějov is an electoral district of the Senate of the Czech Republic, located in the entirety of the Prostějov District and the western part of the Přerov District. Since 2024, the Senator for the district is František Jura.

== Senators ==
Year	Senator	Party
1996	Jan Kavan	ČSSD
2000	Robert Kolář	4KOALICE
2006	Božena Sekaninová	ČSSD
2012	Božena Sekaninová	ČSSD
2018	Jitka Chalánková	Independent
2024	František Jura	ANO 2011

== Election results ==
=== 1996 ===
1996 Czech Senate election in Prostějov
Candidate	Party	1st round		2nd round	
Candidate	Party	Votes	%	Votes	%
Jan Kavan	ČSSD	8 653	24,69	18 070	53,85
Jan Tesař	ODS	10 385	29,63	15 487	46,15
Václav Kolář	ODA	8 255	23,55	—	—
Bohumil Přikryl	KSČM	5 017	14,32	—	—
Vladimír Procházka	MSLK_96	2 042	5,83	—	—
Petr Hanzlík	RS	695	1,98	—	—

=== 2000 ===
2000 Czech Senate election in Prostějov
Candidate	Party	1st round		2nd round	
Candidate	Party	Votes	%	Votes	%
Robert Kolář	4KOALICE	11 039	28,72	17 359	58,10
Jan Kavan	ČSSD	11 644	30,30	12 517	41,89
Václav Šmíd	KSČM	5 503	14,32	—	—
Jan Tesař	ODS	5 376	13,99	—	—
Vladimír Komínek	Independent	3 984	10,36	—	—
Oto Košta	ČSNS	878	2,28	—	—

=== 2006 ===
2006 Czech Senate election in Prostějov
Candidate	Party	1st round		2nd round	
Candidate	Party	Votes	%	Votes	%
Božena Sekaninová	ČSSD	16 091	36,93	14 151	57,36
Ivana Hemerková	ODS	11 279	25,89	10 518	42,63
Jaroslav Čížek	KSČM	5 150	11,82	—	—
Petr Kousal	KDU-ČSL	4 888	11,22	—	—
Vladimír Hučín	KONS	4 838	11,10	—	—
Vladimír Trunda	ČP	1 315	3,01	—	—

=== 2012 ===
2012 Czech Senate election in Prostějov
Candidate	Party	1st round		2nd round	
Candidate	Party	Votes	%	Votes	%
Božena Sekaninová	ČSSD	14 184	42,65	12 313	73,30
Jaroslav Šlambor	KSČM	6 311	18,98	4 483	26,69
Aleš Nevrla	TOP 09, STAN	4 303	12,94	—	—
Pavel Horák	KDU-ČSL	4 234	12,73	—	—
Ladislav Županič	ODS	4 216	12,68	—	—

=== 2018 ===
2018 Czech Senate election in Prostějov
Candidate	Party	1st round		2nd round	
Candidate	Party	Votes	%	Votes	%
Jitka Chalánková	Independent	5 370	12,68	8 472	59,85
Božena Sekaninová	ČSSD	7 913	18,68	5 682	40,14
Irena Blažková	ANO 2011	5 365	12,67	—	—
Jaroslav Fidrmuc	KDU-ČSL	5 208	12,30	—	—
Jan Krchňavý	PV	3 425	8,08	—	—
Marek Obrtel	ČSNS	3 356	7,92	—	—
Dagmar Halašová	ODS	3 289	7,76	—	—
Pavel Dopita	SPD	2 631	6,21	—	—
Zuzana Böhmová	KSČM	2 619	6,18	—	—
Pavel Makový	MZH	1 681	3,97	—	—
Petr Michek	Moravané	1 484	3,50	—	—

=== 2024 ===
2024 Czech Senate election in Prostějov
Candidate	Party	1st round		2nd round	
Candidate	Party	Votes	%	Votes	%
František Jura	ANO 2011	12 502	41,98	8 718	72,43
Pavel Dopita	SPD, Tricolour	4 004	13,44	3 318	27,56
Hana Naiclerová	STAN, Greens, SEN 21	3 889	13,05	—	—
Milada Sokolová	ODS, OPAT	3 842	12,90	—	—
Hana Pospíšilíková	KDU-ČSL	3 553	11,93	—	—
Miroslav Burget	JaSaN	1 998	6,67	—	—
