= Senate district 74 – Karviná =

Electoral district in the Czech Republic

74 – Karviná
- inline Senate district of the Czech Republic

- The Karviná district on a map
- Senator: Petr Vícha; Independent
- Region: Moravian-Silesian
- District: Karviná
- Last election: 2024
- Next election: 2030

Senate district 74 – Karviná is an electoral district of the Senate of the Czech Republic, located in part of the Karviná District. Since 2006, the Senator for the district has been Petr Vícha, elected for the Social Democracy.

== Senators ==
Year	Senator	Party
1996	Alfréd Michalík	ČSSD
2000	Ondřej Feber	US
2006	Petr Vícha	ČSSD
2012	Petr Vícha	ČSSD
2018	Petr Vícha	ČSSD
2024	Petr Vícha	SOCDEM

== Election results ==
=== 1996 ===
1996 Czech Senate election in Karviná
Candidate	Party	1st round		2nd round	
Candidate	Party	Votes	%	Votes	%
Alfréd Michalík	ČSSD	7 386	26,48	16 688	59,78
Karel Cieślar	ODS	9 967	35,73	11 229	40,22
Milada Halíková	KSČM	5 705	20,45	—	—
Cyril Zapletal	Independent	3 483	12,49	—	—
Milan Matula	Independent	1 234	4,42	—	—
Petr Hrubý	MSLK 96	117	0,42	—	—

=== 2000 ===
2000 Czech Senate election in Karviná
Candidate	Party	1st round		2nd round	
Candidate	Party	Votes	%	Votes	%
Ondřej Feber	US	6 010	20,30	10 734	51,66
Milada Halíková	KSČM	9 662	32,64	10 042	48,33
Alfréd Michalík	ČSSD	5 698	19,25	—	—
Emilie Večeřová	ODS	5 693	19,23	—	—
Jan Szotkowski	Independent	1 007	3,40	—	—
Jiří Kopel	Independent	818	2,76	—	—
Václav Žalud	Independent	706	2,38	—	—

=== 2006 ===
2006 Czech Senate election in Karviná
Candidate	Party	1st round		2nd round	
Candidate	Party	Votes	%	Votes	%
Petr Vícha	ČSSD	11 539	33,82	13 364	66,82
Emilie Večeřová	ODS	6 710	19,67	6 636	33,18
Jaroslav Gongol	KSČM	5 834	17,10	—	—
Ondřej Feber	KDU-ČSL	4 004	11,73	—	—
Lubomír Schellong	Independent	1 769	5,18	—	—
Vladimír Mach	NEZ	1 663	4,87	—	—
Jaroslava Kraftová	„21“	1 023	2,99	—	—
Peter Halák	SZ	688	2,01	—	—
Marian Kuś	NEZ/DEM	468	1,37	—	—
Karel Světnička	ODA	412	1,20	—	—

=== 2012 ===
2012 Czech Senate election in Karviná
Candidate	Party	1st round		2nd round	
Candidate	Party	Votes	%	Votes	%
Petr Vícha	ČSSD	12 697	41,18	9 647	59,70
Milada Halíková	KSČM	9 115	29,56	6 510	40,29
Jana Lorencová	SP	5 320	17,25	—	—
Radomil Schreiber	ODS	3 363	10,90	—	—
Jan Odložilík	NÁR.SOC.	331	1,07	—	—

=== 2018 ===
2018 Czech Senate election in Karviná
Candidate	Party	1st round		2nd round	
Candidate	Party	Votes	%	Votes	%
Petr Vícha	ČSSD	10 848	36,72	9 232	72,06
Milada Halíková	KSČM	4 860	16,45	3 578	27,93
Jiří Matěj	ANO	4 086	13,83	—	—
Dušan Karch	Independent	3 145	10,64	—	—
Markéta Kabourková	Independent	2 524	8,54	—	—
Bohdan Kufa	SPD	2 074	7,02	—	—
Karel Světnička	MS Pirates	1 265	4,28	—	—
Ladislav Sitko	TOP 09	740	2,50	—	—

=== 2024 ===
2024 Czech Senate election in Karviná
Candidate	Party	Votes	%
Petr Vícha	SOCDEM, ANO	13 249	58,33
Bohuslav Niemiec	KDU-ČSL, ODS, TOP 09	4 353	19,16
Pavel Staněk	SPD, Tricolour	2 896	12,75
Karel Světnička	Swiss Democracy	1 330	5,85
Karel Volný	ČSSD	884	3,89
