= Senate district 47 – Náchod =

Electoral district in the Czech Republic

47 – Náchod
- inline Senate district of the Czech Republic

- The Náchod district on a map
- Senator: Martin Červíček; ODS
- Region: Hradec Králové
- District: Náchod; Hradec Králové
- Last election: 2024
- Next election: 2030

Senate district 47 – Náchod is an electoral district of the Senate of the Czech Republic, located in part of the Náchod District and the northern part of the Hradec Králové District. Since 2018, the Senator for the district is Martin Červíček.

== Senators ==
Year	Senator	Party
1996	Miloslav Müller	ODS
2000	Petr Fejfar	4KOALICE
2006	Petr Pakosta	ODS
2012	Lubomír Franc	ČSSD
2018	Martin Červíček	ODS
2024	Martin Červíček	ODS

== Election results ==
=== 1996 ===
1996 Czech Senate election in Náchod
Candidate	Party	1st round		2nd round	
Candidate	Party	Votes	%	Votes	%
Miloslav Müller	ODS	17 346	48,84	18 007	62,13
Jiří Hanuš	KDU-ČSL	6 143	17,30	10 976	37,87
Uršula Kluková	ČSSD	5 528	15,56	—	—
František Meduna	KSČM	3 644	10,26	—	—
Jan Kačer	ČSNS	2 856	8,04	—	—

=== 2000 ===
2000 Czech Senate election in Náchod
Candidate	Party	1st round		2nd round	
Candidate	Party	Votes	%	Votes	%
Petr Fejfar	4KOALICE	11 409	35,50	12 495	62,37
Miloslav Čermák	ODS	9 294	28,92	7 537	37,62
Richard Sacher	ČSSD	6 977	21,71	—	—
Miroslava Doležalová	KSČM	3 854	11,99	—	—
Eduard Katzer	NDS	600	1,86	—	—

=== 2006 ===
2006 Czech Senate election in Náchod
Candidate	Party	1st round		2nd round	
Candidate	Party	Votes	%	Votes	%
Petr Pakosta	ODS	12 385	32,11	10 046	57,69
Petr Fejfar	US-DEU	5 377	13,94	7 367	42,30
Karel Nývlt	KDU-ČSL	5 099	13,22	—	—
Jan Uhlíř	ČSSD	4 077	10,57	—	—
František Rázl	KSČM	4 011	10,40	—	—
Jan Regner	SNK ED	3 679	9,53	—	—
František Molík	SZ	2 202	5,70	—	—
Josef Veselka	ČP	840	2,17	—	—
Dušica Zimová	NEZ	790	2,04	—	—
Richard Knot	Koal_ČR	104	0,26	—	—

=== 2012 ===
2012 Czech Senate election in Náchod
Candidate	Party	1st round		2nd round	
Candidate	Party	Votes	%	Votes	%
Lubomír Franc	ČSSD	5 444	15,90	9 435	61,82
Soňa Marková	KSČM	5 650	16,50	5 827	38,17
Petr Pakosta	Independent	4 345	12,69	—	—
Jiří Klepsa	SD-SN	3 331	9,73	—	—
Zdeňka Horníková	ODS	3 145	9,18	—	—
Miroslav Štěpán	KDU-ČSL	2 957	8,63	—	—
Václava Domšová	ANO 2011	2 859	8,35	—	—
Petr Fejfar	Independent	2 532	7,39	—	—
Bedřich Moldan	TOP 09, STAN	2 066	6,03	—	—
Renata Hodovalová	Suverenity	1 448	4,23	—	—
Jiří Štětina	VV	449	1,31	—	—

=== 2018 ===
2018 Czech Senate election in Náchod
Candidate	Party	1st round		2nd round	
Candidate	Party	Votes	%	Votes	%
Martin Červíček	ODS	11 656	26,49	12 480	56,46
Pavel Bělobrádek	KDU-ČSL	11 714	26,62	9 624	43,53
Petr Koleta	ANO 2011	9 885	22,47	—	—
Soňa Marková	KSČM	4 224	9,60	—	—
Miroslav Brát	ČSSD	3 888	8,83	—	—
Andrea Pajgerová	SPD	2 621	5,95	—	—

=== 2024 ===
2024 Czech Senate election in Náchod
Candidate	Party	1st round		2nd round	
Candidate	Party	Votes	%	Votes	%
Martin Červíček	ODS	15 891	48,73	13 670	62,18
Jan Borůvka	ANO 2011	10 045	30,80	8 313	37,81
Tomáš Magnusek	TMS	6 669	20,45	—	—
