= Senate district 68 – Opava =

Electoral district in the Czech Republic

68 – Opava
- inline Senate district of the Czech Republic

- The Opava district on a map
- Senator: Tomáš Navrátil; ANO 2011
- Region: Moravian-Silesian
- District: Opava
- Last election: 2024
- Next election: 2030

Senate district 68 – Opava is an electoral district of the Senate of the Czech Republic, located in part of the Opava District. Since 2024, the Senator for the district has been Tomáš Navrátil, an ANO 2011 member.

== Senators ==
Year	Senator	Party
1996	Jan Voráček	ODS
2000	Josef Jařab	4KOALICE
2006	Václav Vlček	ODS
2012	Vladimír Plaček	ČSSD
2018	Herbert Pavera	TOP 09
2024	Tomáš Navrátil	ANO 2011

== Election results ==
=== 1996 ===
1996 Czech Senate election in Opava
Candidate	Party	1st round		2nd round	
Candidate	Party	Votes	%	Votes	%
Jan Voráček	ODS	7 324	25.61	11 266	56.33
Antonín Šrom	KDU-ČSL	5 276	18.45	8 733	43.67
Jan Mrázek	ODA	4 592	16.06	—	—
Václav Hrubec	ČSSD	4 164	14.56	—	—
Dušan Jaroš	KSČM	3 340	11.68	—	—
Václav Klučka	Independent	1 503	5.26	—	—
František Peringer	ČSNS	1 214	4.25	—	—
Rudolf Mikoláš	RU	622	2.18	—	—
Jiří Volný	KAN	561	1.96	—	—

=== 2000 ===
2000 Czech Senate election in Opava
Candidate	Party	1st round		2nd round	
Candidate	Party	Votes	%	Votes	%
Josef Jařab	4KOALICE	9 174	28.47	10 697	57.09
Václav Vlček	ODS	11 139	34.57	8 037	42.90
Zdeněk Petřík	KSČM	4 598	14.27	—	—
Radim Masný	Independent	4 423	13.72	—	—
Bedřich Lešenar	ČSSD	2 881	8.94	—	—

=== 2006 ===
2006 Czech Senate election in Opava
Candidate	Party	1st round		2nd round	
Candidate	Party	Votes	%	Votes	%
Václav Vlček	ODS	12 505	31.14	11 009	54.67
Zdeněk Jirásek	ČSSD	9 716	24.19	9 126	45.32
Vojtěch Turek	KDU-ČSL	4 558	11.35	—	—
Radim Masný	NEZ/DEM	4 409	10.98	—	—
Josef Kimpl	KSČM	4 229	10.53	—	—
Jan Mrázek	SNK ED	3 127	7.78	—	—
Jiří Krist	SZ	1 609	4.00	—	—

=== 2012 ===
2012 Czech Senate election in Opava
Candidate	Party	1st round		2nd round	
Candidate	Party	Votes	%	Votes	%
Vladimír Plaček	ČSSD	9 347	30.43	11 372	62.23
Václav Vlček	ODS	6 214	20.23	6 909	37.76
Miroslav Opálka	KSČM	5 592	18.2	—	—
Josef Stiborský	KDU-ČSL	4 543	14.79	—	—
Tomáš Papuga	TOP 09, STAN	3 466	11.28	—	—
Jindřich Skařupa	KSČ	1 551	5.04	—	—

=== 2018 ===
2018 Czech Senate election in Opava
Candidate	Party	1st round		2nd round	
Candidate	Party	Votes	%	Votes	%
Herbert Pavera	ODS, STAN, TOP 09	15 900	36.27	13 949	68.50
Simona Horáková	ANO 2011	9 443	21.54	6 414	31.49
Vladimír Tancík	Independent	5 324	12.14	—	—
Petr Pavlíček	Pirates	5 014	11.43	—	—
Josef Vícha	KDU-ČSL	3 241	7.39	—	—
Kamil Běrský	SPD	2 885	6.58	—	—
Vlastimil Kupka	KSČM	2 030	4.63	—	—

=== 2024 ===
2024 Czech Senate election in Opava
Candidate	Party	1st round		2nd round	
Candidate	Party	Votes	%	Votes	%
Tomáš Navrátil	ANO 2011	16 313	49.49	15 265	63.68
Herbert Pavera	TOP 09, KDU-ČSL, ODS	9 265	28.11	8 703	36.31
René Černohorský	SOCDEM	1 832	5.55	—	—
Michael Rataj	STAN, OK	1 819	5.51	—	—
Vladimír Tancík	Independent	1 690	5.12	—	—
Zita Calabri	SPD, Tricolour	1 459	4.42	—	—
Brigita Bilíková	Mourek	458	1.38	—	—
Bronislav Sedláček	JaSaN	123	0.37	—	—
