= 2007 Czech Senate by-elections =

By-elections for Chomutov and Přerov District Senate seats were held in 2017. Election in Chomutov was held on 13 and 14 April while in Přerov on 27-28 April.

== Chomutov ==
Communist Václav Homolka has won the election in Chomutov. He defeated Jan Řehák. This election was held when the incumbent stepped down due to health matters.

Candidate	Party	First round		Second round	
Candidate	Party	Votes	%	Votes	%
Václav Homolka	Communist Party of Bohemia and Moravia	2,529	23.28	5,373	55.32
Jan Řehák	Civic Democratic Party	2,760	25.41	4,338	44.67
Jan Mareš	Czech Social Democratic Party	2,510	23.11		
Josef Märc	Green Party	1,101	10.13		
Milan Beran	Independent	875	8.05		
Milan Doležal	Independent	499	4.59		
Antonín Drbohlav	Independent	396	3.64		
František Lehotský	Party for Dignified Life	101	0.93		
Zdeněk Jánský	Humanist Party	89	0.81		

== Přerov ==
Přerov election was a battle between Social Democrat Jiří Latjtoch and Communist Josef Nekl. Lajtoch was supported by right wing parties in the second round. Lajtoch narrowly won the election.

Candidate	Party	First round		Second round	
Candidate	Party	Votes	%	Votes	%
Jiří Lajtoch	Czech Social Democratic Party	3,946	20.91	5,552	53.23
Josef Nekl	Communist Party of Bohemia and Moravia	3,822	20.25	4,877	47.76
Jiří Bakalík	Christian and Democratic Union – Czechoslovak People's Party	2,814	14.91		
Elena Grambličková	Civic Democratic Party	2,809	14.88		
Vladimír Juračka	Party for the Open Society	2,714	14.38		
Jiří Klein	Independent	1,381	7.31		
Monika Holečková	Party of Common Sense	1,012	5.36		
Jaroslav Suchánek	SNK European Democrats	373	1.97		
