= Vladimír Plaček =

Czech medical doctor and politician

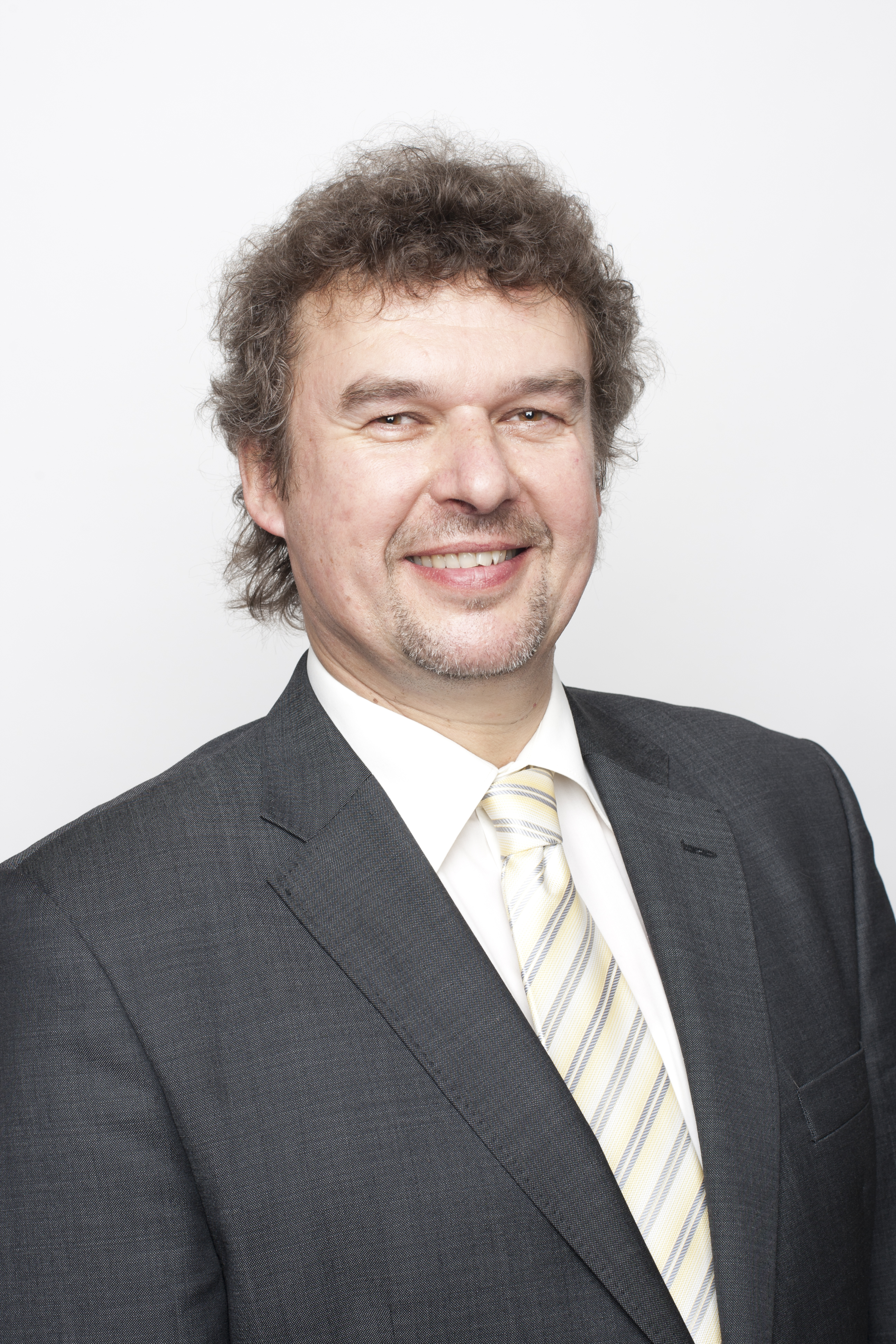

Vladimír Plaček (29 May 1965 – 2 August 2018) was a Czech medical doctor and politician affiliated with the Czech Social Democratic Party.

Plaček graduated from the faculty of medicine at Masaryk University in 1990, and earned another degree from the University of Ostrava in 2008. He served on the Senate from 2012 until his death on 2 August 2018, aged 53.
