= Jitka Chalánková =

Politician and doctor

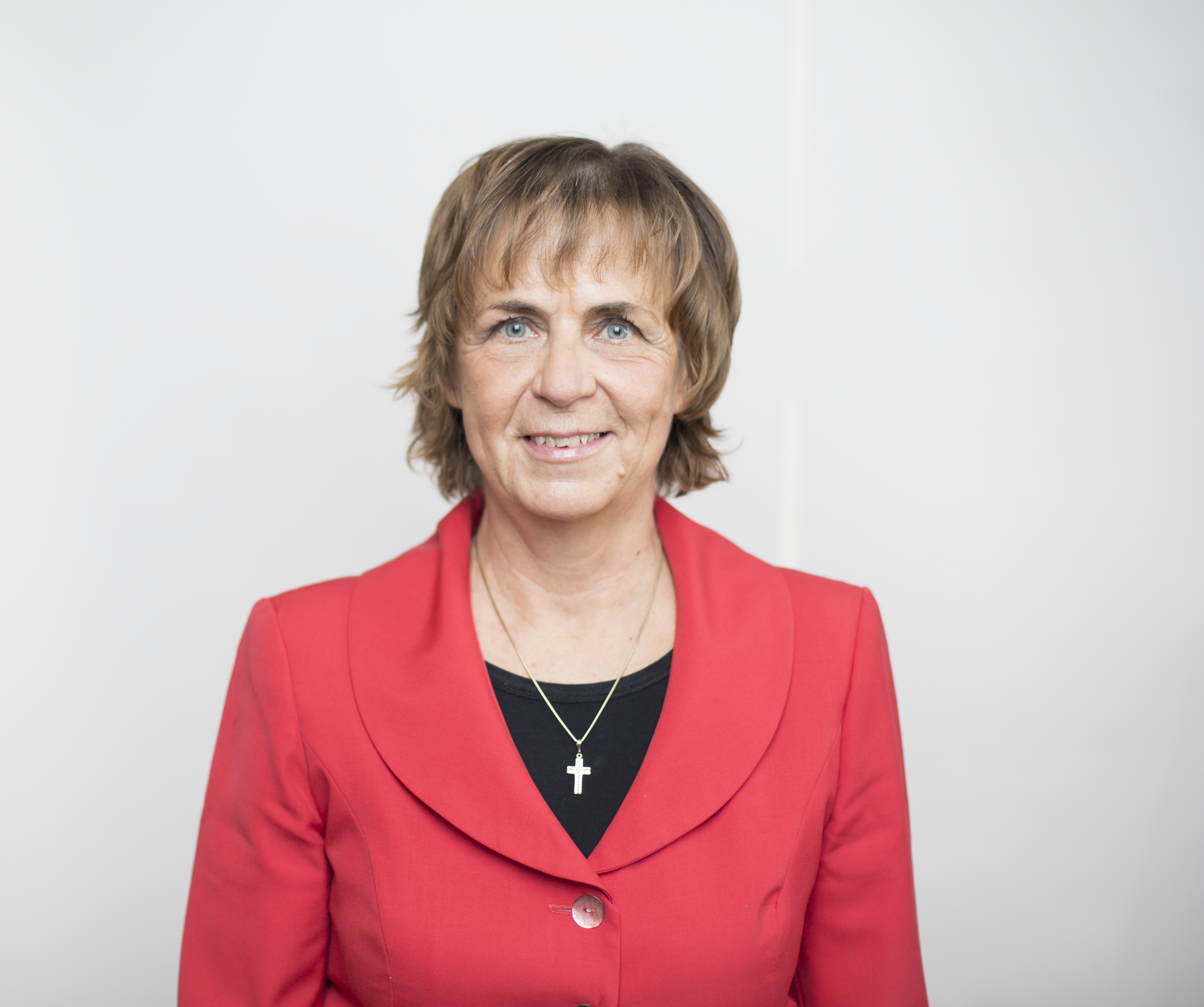
- Portrait of Jitka Chalánková

Deputy chairwomen of TOP 09
- In office 29 November 2015 – 26 November 2017

Member of Chamber of Deputies
- In office 26 October 2013 – 26 October 2017
- In office 29 May 2010 – 28 August 2013

Member of Senate
- In office 13 October 2018 – 13 October 2024
- Preceded by: Božena Sekaninová
- Succeeded by: František Jura

Personal details
- Born: 23 March 1957 (age 69) Bruntál, Czechoslovakia
- Party: TOP 09 (2009–2018)
- Education: Palacký University, Olomouc
- Website: Official website

Jitka Chalánková (born 23 March 1957 in Bruntál) is a Czech politician, doctor, former member of Chamber of Deputies for Olomouc region and former Chairwoman of TOP 09 party. Since 2018 she is a member of the Senate where as a member of the Civic Democratic Party caucus.
