= Koruna Česká (party) =

Czech monarchist political party

The Czech Crown (Monarchist Party of Bohemia, Moravia and Silesia) Koruna Česká (monarchistická strana Čech, Moravy a Slezska)
- Abbreviation: Koruna Česká
- President: Vojtěch Círus
- Vice President: Luboš Samuel Erbandorf
- Founded: 25 November 1990 (Note: Officially registered on 29 August 1991.)
- Preceded by: Czech Children Movement
- Headquarters: Revoluční 1082/8, Prague 1
- Newspaper: Monarchistický zpravodaj Monarchistické listy
- Think tank: Royal Institute of Political Science
- Youth wing: Young Monarchists
- Membership (2015): 195
- Ideology: Monarchism; Conservatism; Christian democracy Soft Euroscepticism
- Political position: Centre-right to right-wing
- International affiliation: International Monarchist Conference
- Colours: Blue, gold
- Slogan: "The King belongs to the Castle"
- Chamber of Deputies: 0 / 200
- Senate: 0 / 81
- European Parliament: 0 / 21
- Local councils: 4 / 61,892

Website
- korunaceska.cz

Czech Crown (Monarchist Party of Bohemia, Moravia and Silesia) (Czech: Koruna Česká (monarchistická strana Čech, Moravy a Slezska), Koruna Česká) is a Czech monarchist political party that strives for the restoration of Czech monarchy with the House of Habsburg-Lorraine. The party was founded in 1990 and its current leader is Vojtěch Círus. In the 2017 Czech legislative election, Koruna Česká ran in a coalition with TOP 09 and received 5.35% of the vote. In the 2019 European Parliament election, it ran together with the KDU-ČSL and received 7.24% of the vote.

== History ==
=== Political movement ===
Koruna Česká is one of the oldest active political parties in the Czech Republic founded after the end of the Communist regime in Czechoslovakia. Its precursor was a monarchist civic initiative, "Czech Children", founded in 1988 by Petr Placák as a dissident group against the communist regime. They published a samizdat magazine called Koruna.

Koruna Česká as a political movement was founded on 25 November 1990 in Prague's Švanda Theatre, officially naming itself Czech Crown (Royalist Movement of Bohemia, Moravia and Silesia). Dalibor Stejskal was elected as its first leader. On 14 December 1991 the first General Assembly of Koruna Česká convened. In 1993 KČ formed a political partnership with the Christian Democratic Party of Václav Benda and in the following years they closely cooperated, until the latter merged with the Civic Democratic Party in 1996.

The second leader of KČ (1997–1999) was Dalibor Pták (politician) and the third (1999–2003) was Milan Schelinger, a musician and brother of famous Czech rock singer Jiří Schelinger. In 2003 KČ was transformed from a political movement into a political party.

=== Political party ===
In May 2003 Schelinger resigned as the leader of the party and in November 2003 Václav Srb, who had been the party's hejtman of Bohemia, was elected as the new leader. Since 2004 the party has actively contested in every election. In the 2006 Czech municipal elections they gained their first local councillors and mayors.

While in the early years, the official position of KČ was that they have no authority to decide who would be the new Czech king, in 2007 KČ clarified its monarchist position as legitimism (actively supporting the claim of the House of Habsburg-Lorraine as descendants of Charles I of Austria, the last King of Bohemia).

In 2011 KČ suffered an internal crisis when a "conservative platform" was formed, critical of the policy of the party and striving to shift its political position more in a national conservative direction. The conservative platform tried to take over the party, but it was defeated during the XX General Assembly in November 2011. Many of its members then left the party and founded a conservative monarchist association called MONOS.

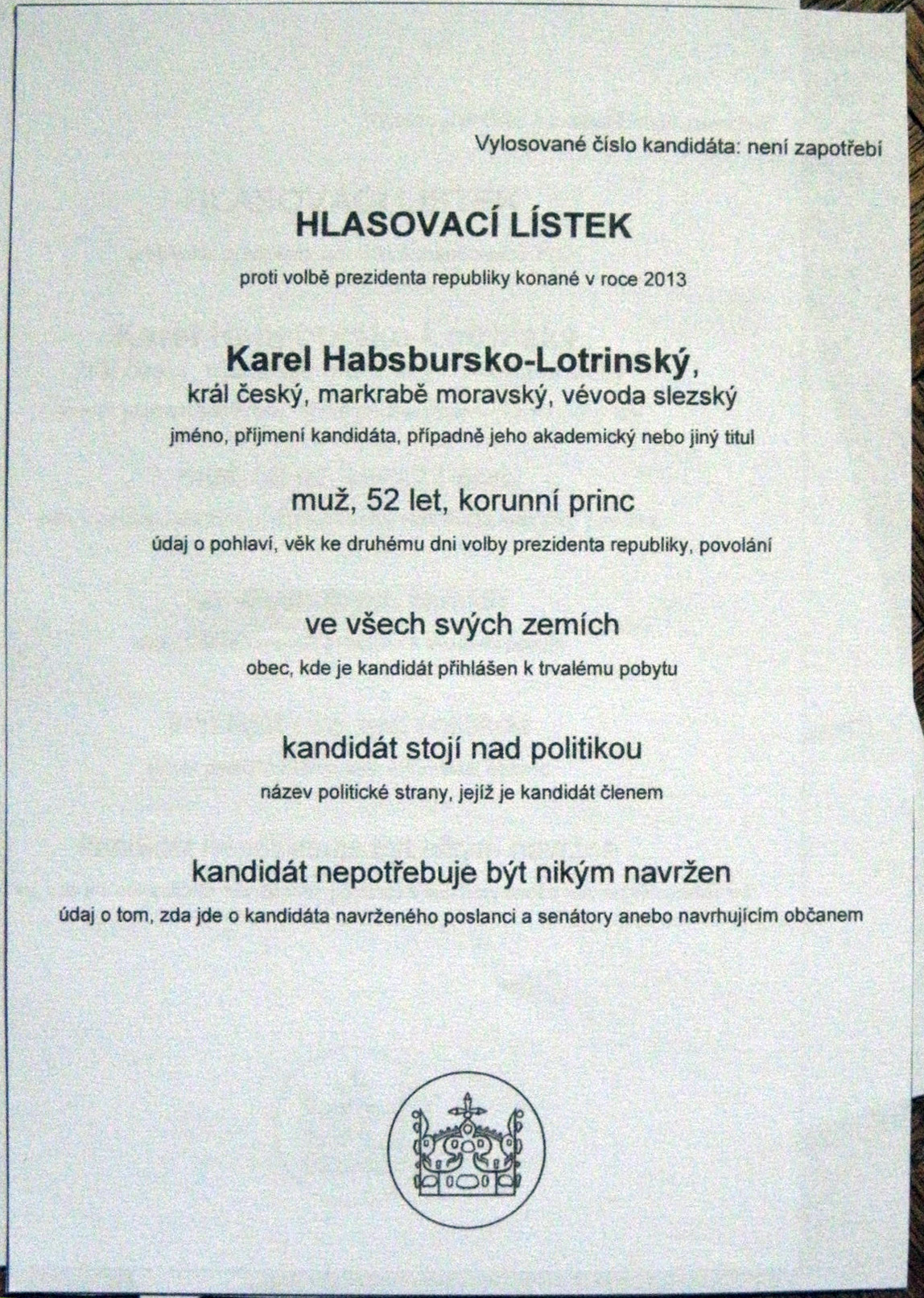
Fictional royal voting ticket for the presidential election 2013

In the 2013 Czech presidential election, the first direct presidential election in the country, KČ boycotted the election, as it was contrary to its goal of unelected head of state. At the same time, an independent monarchist candidate, sculptor Emil Adamec announced his candidacy, but he failed to gather enough signatures of citizens to become a candidate. Some members of KČ supported him, while others urged the party to support the candidacy of Karel Schwarzenberg as an aristocrat and a personal friend of the royal house. KČ remained neutral, but issued a statement that if monarchists want to participate, then Schwarzenberg is the best choice. Some KČ members also created mock ballots for Karl von Habsburg as an heir to the throne, which garnered some media attention.

In the 2013 legislative election KČ competed in 11 of 14 regions. They were locally successful in Hlinná in Ústí nad Labem Region, where they got 16% of the vote.

In the 2014 Senate election a coalition candidate of KČ and ODS -- Lumír Aschenbrenner -- was successful in Plzeň. In the XXIII General Assembly on 29 November 2014 Petr Nohel defeated Petr Krátký (politician) with 72% of the vote to become the new leader of the party.

In the 2017 legislative election, Koruna Česká -- together with the Conservative Party and Club of Committed Non-Party Members -- agreed to jointly endorse TOP 09, while TOP 09 added candidates of the smaller parties to its list. The TOP 09 list eventually received 5.3% of the vote, winning seven seats in the parliament, albeit none of them for KČ members.

In the 2018 presidential election KČ again boycotted the election and urged their members to cast a symbolic but invalid ballot for Karl von Habsburg. But in the 2018 Czech Senate election, Jitka Chalánková, an independent candidate running with the support of Koruna Česká and the Conservative Party, was successful.

In the XXVII General Assembly in November 2018, Radim Špaček (politician) was elected as the new leader of the party. link=https://cs.wikipedia.org/wiki/Soubor:Logo_of_Monarchiste.cz.svg|thumb|267x267px|Another version of the logo used In the 2019 European Parliament election Koruna Česká, together with other smaller parties, formed a coalition with the KDU-ČSL; their combined list received 7.24% of the vote. After the election, KČ suggested Archduke Karl von Habsburg as the next President of the European Commission and sent a formal request to the Prime Minister of the Czech Republic to support him. Since June 2019 Czech royalists have been heavily involved in the protests against Prime Minister Andrej Babiš and President Miloš Zeman as was reported by some Czech media and the International Monarchist League.

== Presidum ==
Koruna Česká's Presidium, resulting from the party's XXXth General Assembly held on 1 April 2023 in Kroměříž:

- President – Vojtěch Círus
- Vice President – Luboš Samuel Erbandorf
- Secretary General – Kateřina Boušková
- Party Provincial Governors:
  - Czech Party Provincial Governor – Luboš Samuel Erbandorf
  - Moravian Party Provincial Governor – Pavel Andrš (politician)
  - Silesian Party Provincial Governor – Romana Hegrová
- Other Presidium members: Jiří Čížek (politician), Matěj Čadil, Jindřich Holub, Jan Konrád, Miroslav Pošvář

== Party Presidents ==
#	Person	Photo	Period
1	Dalibor Stejskal		19 December 1991 – 24 February 1996
2	Dalibor Pták (politician)		24 February 1996 – 3 June 1999
3	Milan Schelinger		3 June 1999 – 29 November 2003
4	Václav Srb		29 November 2003 – 29 November 2014
5	Petr Nohel		29 November 2014 – 24 November 2018
6	Radim Špaček (politician)		24 November 2018 – 1 April 2023
7	Vojtěch Círus		from 1 April 2023

=== Honorary members of the Koruna Česká ===
Since 2015, at its general assemblies, Koruna Česká has granted honorary membership to prominent public figures who are related to the party in thought and have contributed significantly to the promotion of its ideas. Honorary membership in the Koruna Česká was awarded to the following personalities:

- 2015: Milan Buben, Jan Royt, Jaroslav Maxmilián Kašparů
- 2016: Jiří Rak, Jan Drocár
- 2017: Hugo Mensdorff-Pouilly, Jan Vrabec
- 2022: ~~Zdeněk Prázdný~~ – he renounced it in March 2024
- 2024: Charles A. Coulombe, Alexander Tomský, Jan Ziegler

In addition to honorary members, there is also the honorary position of honorary chairman, held by former chairman Václav Srb.

== Election results ==
=== Chamber of Deputies ===
Year	Votes (in %)	Votes (in numbers)	Seats
2006	0.13%	7293	0
2010	0.07%	4024	0
2013	0.17%	8932	0
2017	5.35% (Note: In coalition with TOP 09 and other parties)	268 811 (Note: in coalition with TOP 09 and other parties.)	0
2021	0.16%	8635	0
2025	0.13%	7313	0

=== European Parliament ===
Year	Vote	Seats
2004	0.21%	0
2009	0.19%	0
2014	0.16%	0
2019	7.24% (Note: In coalition with KDU-ČSL and other parties)	0

== Elected representatives ==
=== Mayors and municipal councillors ===
Representatives who have been nominated by or are members of the Koruna Česká are counted.

==== 2014–2018 ====
- Pavel Ondrůj (municipal councillor of Olbramkostel)

==== 2018–2022 ====
- Jindřich Holub (mayor of Pohleď)
- Jaroslav Vavříček (municipal councillor Jakartovice)
- Jaroslav Kolbek (municipal councillor Pletený Újezd)
- Daniela Krausová (representative of the municipality Pchery)
- Michal Pulchart (municipal councillor Pchery)
- Dagmar Wittbergerová (representative of the Praha-Dolní Počernice district)

==== 2022–2026 ====
- Nathaniel Filip de Aras (municipal councillor Opatovice nad Labem)
- Jindřich Holub (Mayor of Pohleď)
- Jan Konrád (municipal councillor Okrouhlá)
- Vladislav Pečinka (councillor of Horní Benešov)

=== Senators ===
==== 2014–2020 ====
- Lumír Aschenbrenner (coalition candidate ODS and Monarchiste.cz)

==== 2018–2024 ====
- Jitka Chalánková (independent candidate endorsed by KONS and Monarchiste.cz)

==== 2020–2026 ====
- Lumír Aschenbrenner (coalition candidate of ODS, TOP 09, KDU-ČSL, ADS and Monarchiste.cz)

===== 2024–2030 =====
- Zdeněk Hraba (koaliční kandidát ODS, KONS, Svobodní a Koruna Česká)
- Stanislav Balík (nezávislý kandidát podpořený ODS, KDU-ČSL, KONS a Koruna Česká)
