= Party for Life Security =

Party for Life Security Strana za životní jistoty
- Leader: Josef Koníček; Eduard Kremlička; Marcela Kozerová
- Founded: 22 December 1989
- Dissolved: 6 December 2005
- Merged into: Independent Democrats
- Headquarters: Prague
- Ideology: Pensioners' interests Social justice Social democracy
- Political position: Centre-left
- Colours: Green

Party flag

Party for Life Security (Czech: Strana za životní jistoty, SŽJ) was a Czech political party that focused on Pensioner's issues. It became widely known during 1998 Czech parliamentary election when it was expected to gain seats in Parliament.

== History ==
SŽJ was established on 22 December 1989 as Pensioner's Movement for Life Security (Czech: Hnutí důchodců za životní jistoty, HDŽJ). Josef Koníček became the first leader of the Party. HDŽJ transformed into a political party in 1994 and changed its name to Pensioners for Life Security (Czech: Důchodci za životní jistoty,DŽJ). SŽJ participated in the 1996 parliamentary election in coalition with Czech Union of Women. Eduard Kremlička became the leader of SŽJ after the election.

SŽJ started to rise in polls ahead of the 1998 parliamentary election and was expected to gain over 10% of the popular vote. Social Democrat leader Miloš Zeman started coalition talks with SŽJ and KSČM. Party leader Kremlička made a bet with a reporter that he would eat a bug if SŽJ failed to get over the 5% threshold, but SŽJ received only 3% and Kremlička had to eat a bug, which resulted in his expulsion from the party because other members of SŽJ concluded that he dishonored all pensioners. SŽJ changed its name to Party for Life Security (Czech: Strana za životní jistoty, SŽJ). It merged with Independent Democrats in 2006.

== Election results ==
=== Chamber of Deputies ===
Year	Vote	Vote %	Seats
1992	244,319	3.77	0
1996	187,455	3.09	0
1998	182,900	3.06	0
2002	41,404	0.86	0
