= National Socialists – Left of the 21st century =

National Socialists Národní socialisté
- Left: Logo before 2017; Right: logo after 2017
- Abbreviation: NÁR.SOC. LEV 21 (former)
- Founder: Jiří Paroubek
- Founded: 1 November 2011
- Dissolved: 28 May 2022
- Split from: Czech Social Democratic Party
- Merged into: Czech National Social Party
- Headquarters: Radlická 58, Prague
- Ideology: Popular socialism Left-wing nationalism Euroscepticism
- Colours: Red

The National Socialists – Left of the 21st century (Czech: Národní socialisté – levice 21. století, NÁR.SOC.) also known as Left 21 (Levice 21, LEV 21) was a left-wing political party in the Czech Republic founded in October 2011 by Jiří Paroubek, former Prime Minister and former leader of the Czech Social Democratic Party (ČSSD).

Former Prime Minister Jiří Paroubek was elected chairman of his newly founded party at the constituent congress on 26 November. In the year 2012, the party had two representatives in the 200-seat Chamber of Deputies, Paroubek and Jiří Šlégr (ex-ČSSD).

The party name was a reference to the historical popular-socialist Czech National Social Party, founded in 1897, and as such they did not advocate for German Nazism. National Socialists wanted to follow up the tradition of the left-wing Czechoslovak independence movement in the Austro-Hungarian Empire. Nevertheless, in the 2017 Czech legislative election, LEV 21 allied with the Czech Neo-Nazi party, Workers' Party of Social Justice.

In 2011, the Paroubek's National Socialists wanted to merge with the Czech National Socialist Party, so that Paroubek's party would have historical succession with the original Czech National Social Party, but the parties ultimately did not legally merge, only some Czech National Socialist Party members switched to the Paroubek's National Socialists.

On 28 May 2022, the National Socialists, and also the Czech National Socialist Party, "merged" into the original Czech National Social Party (the party dissolved and its members re-registered as members of the original Czech National Social Party).

== Election results ==
=== Chamber of Deputies ===
Date	Leader	Votes		Seats		Position
Date	Leader	#	%	#	Size	Position
2013	Jiří Paroubek	3,843	0.08	0 / 200	18th	Opposition

== See also ==
- Czech National Social Party
- Czech National Socialist Party
- List of political parties in the Czech Republic
