= 2024 Czech Senate election =

2024 election to one-third of the Czech Senate

- 20–21 September 2024 (first round); 27–28 September 2024 (second round)

27 of the 81 seats in the Senate
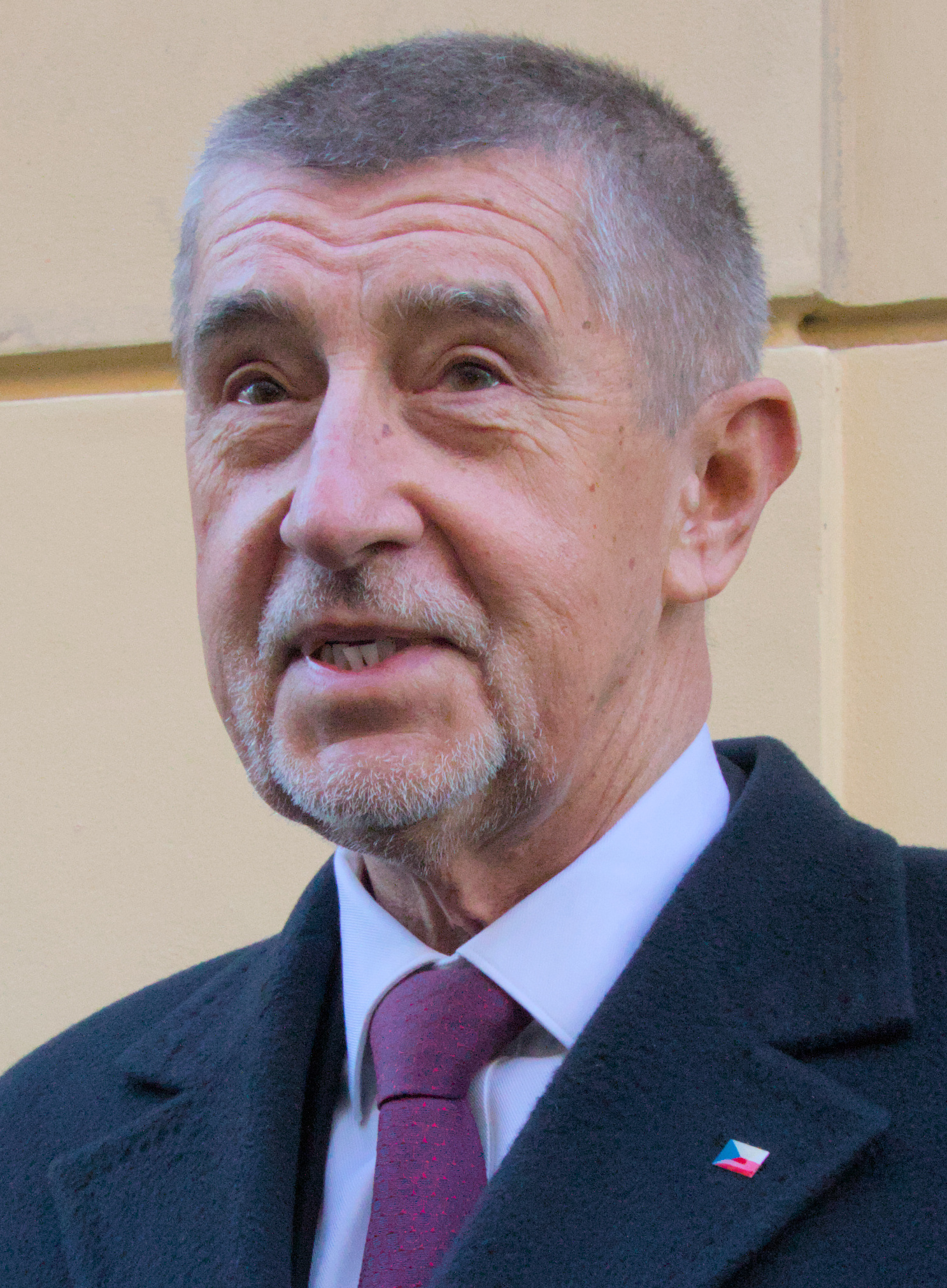

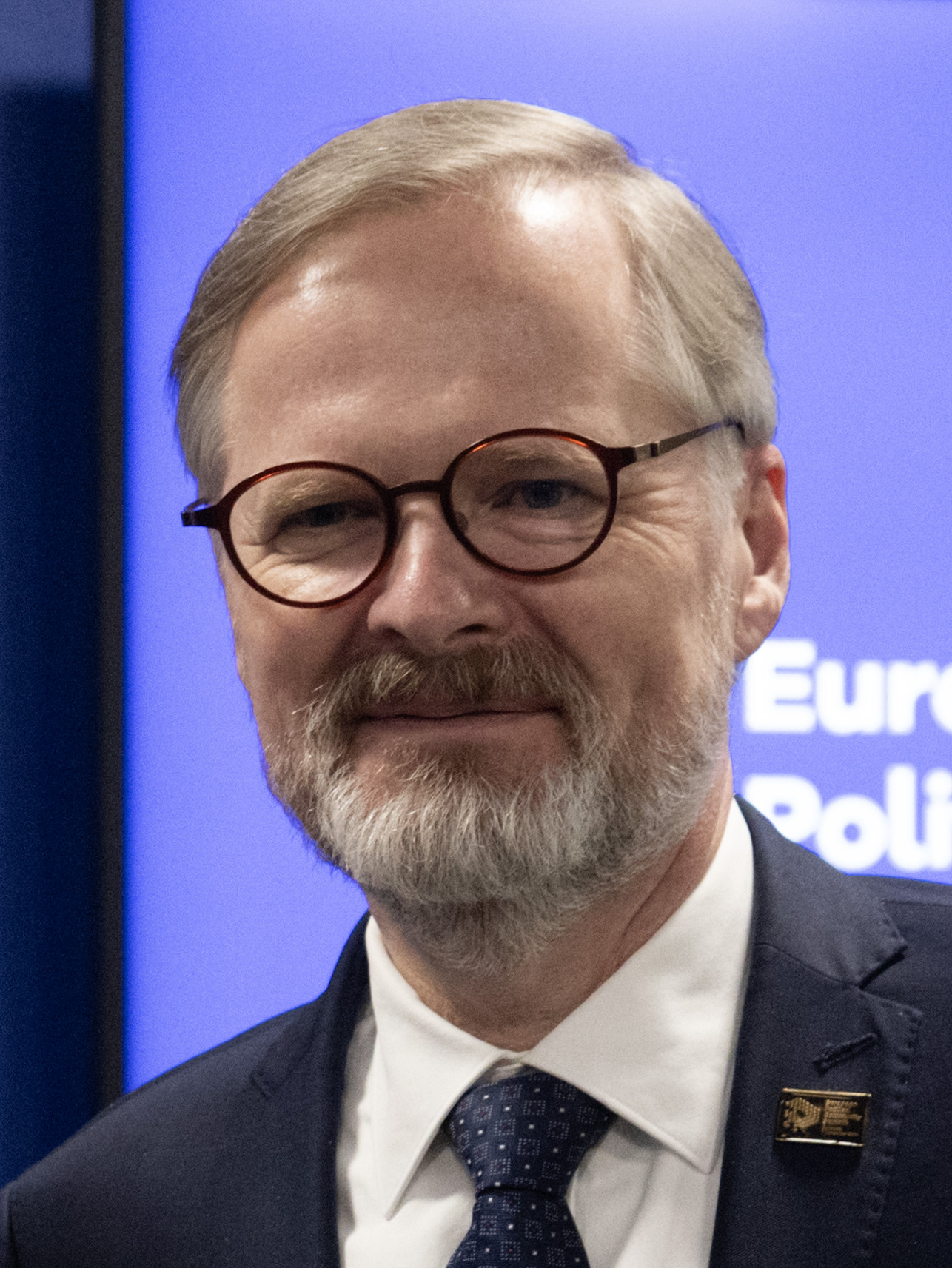

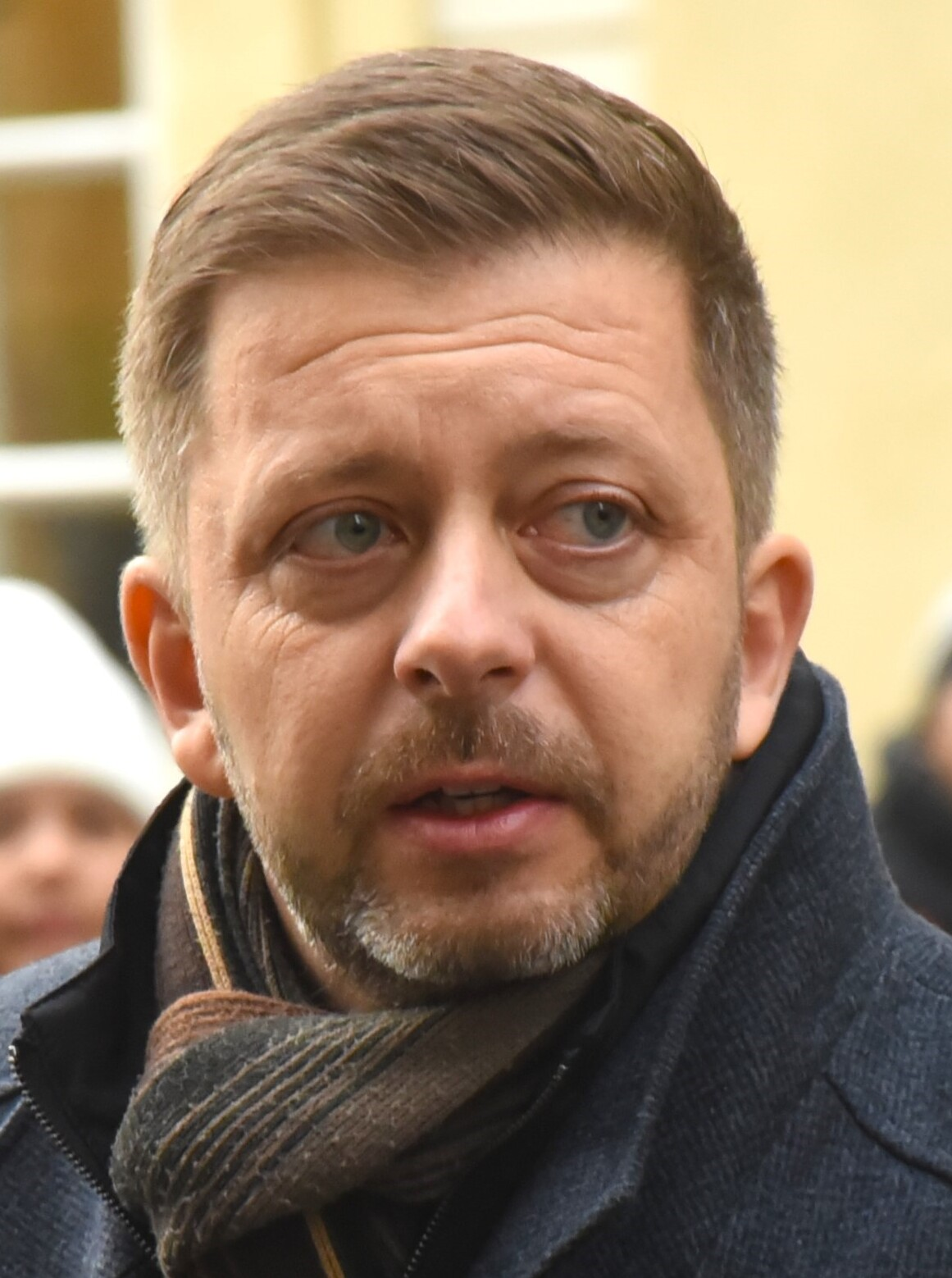

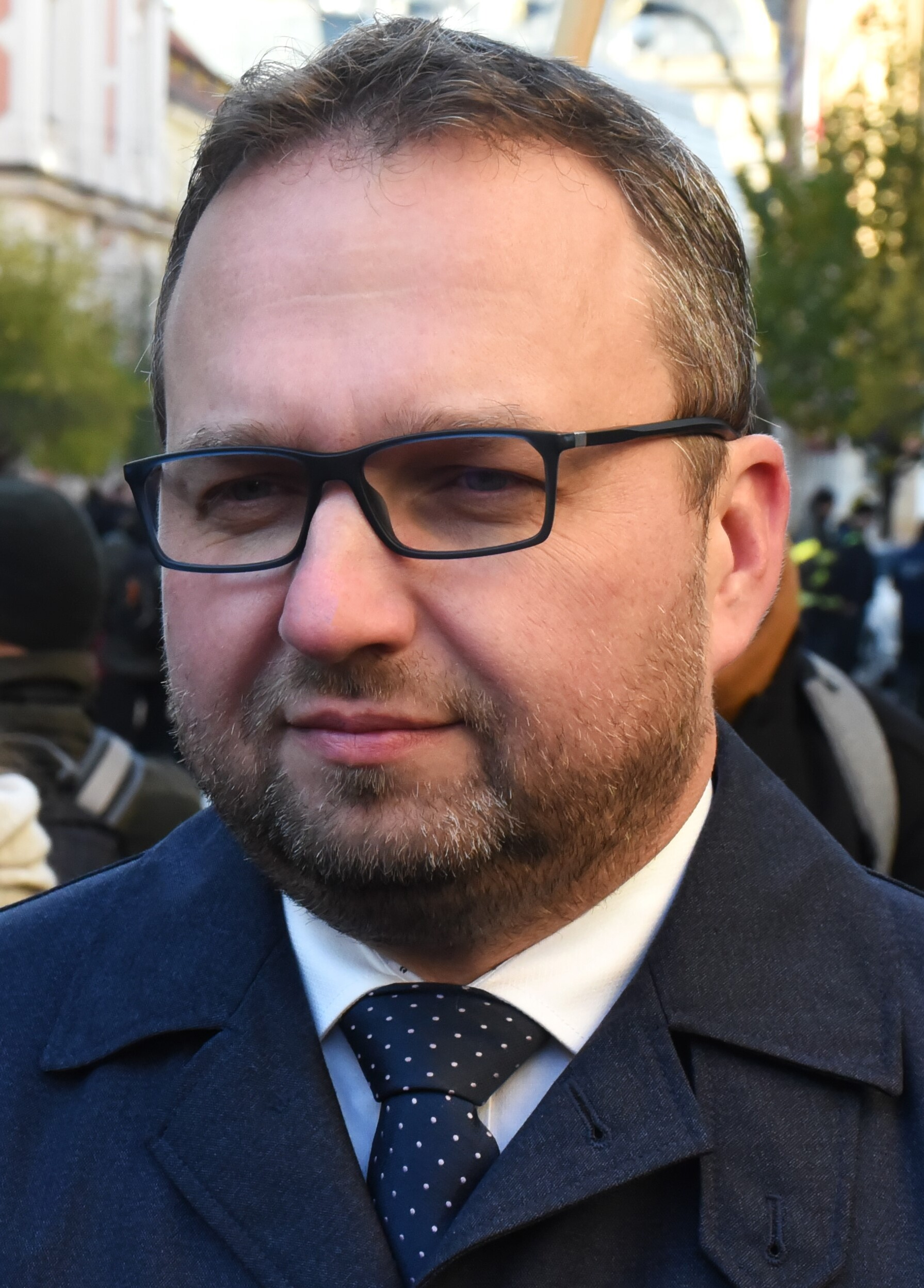

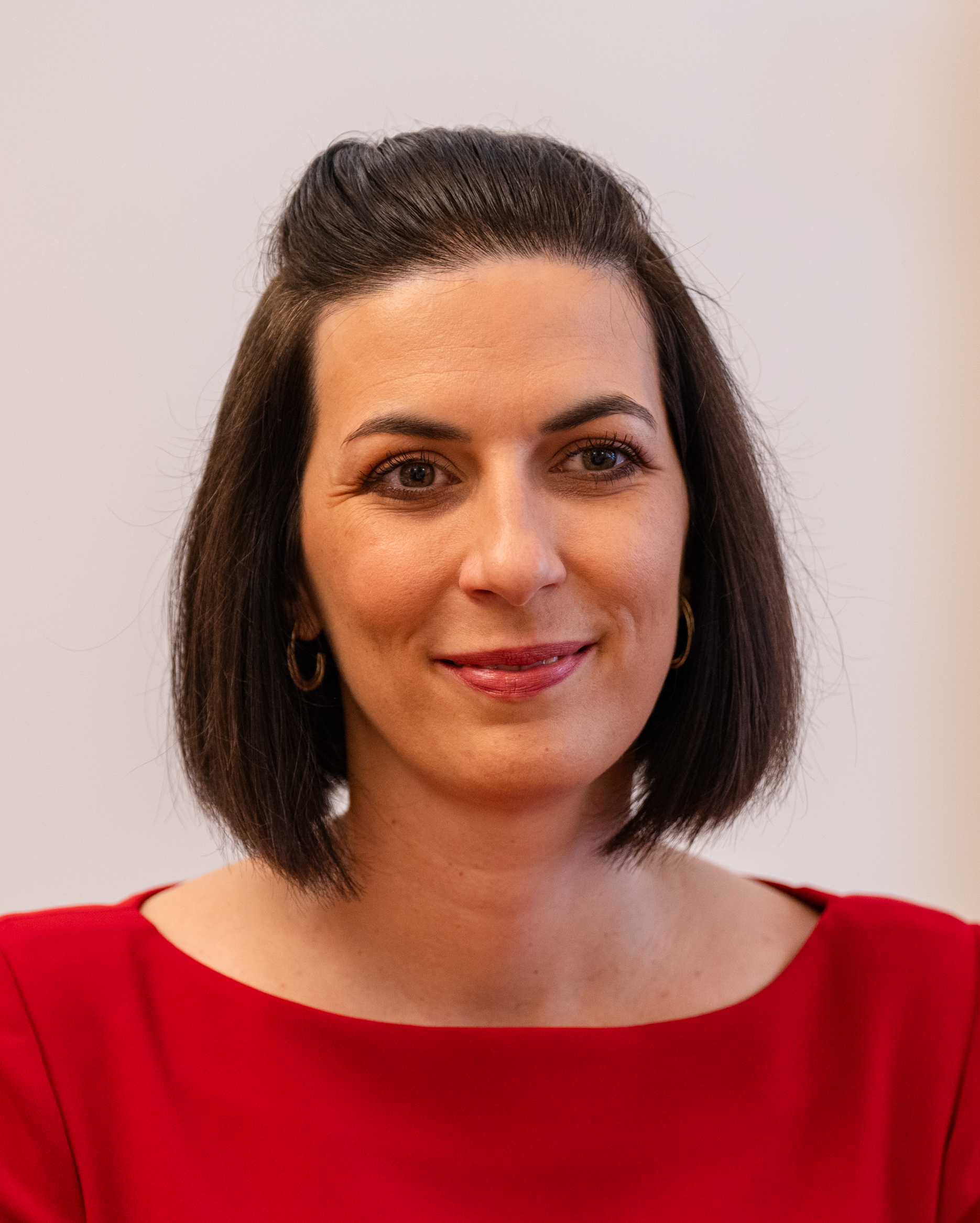

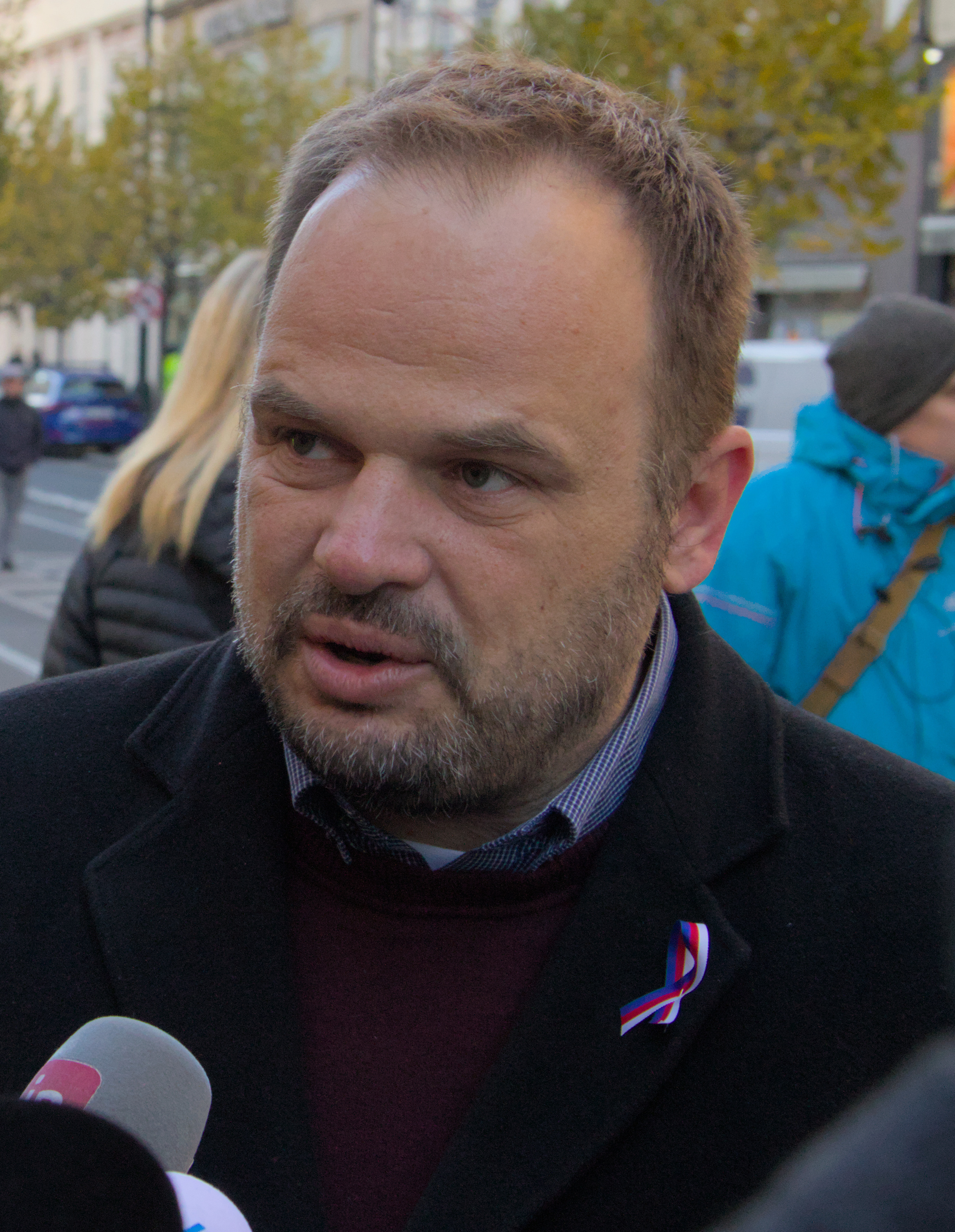

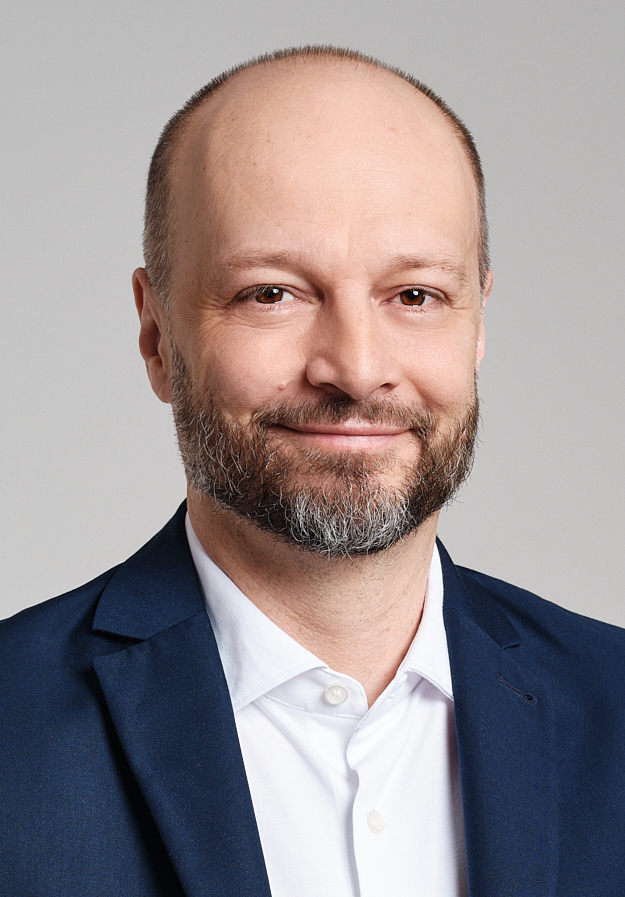

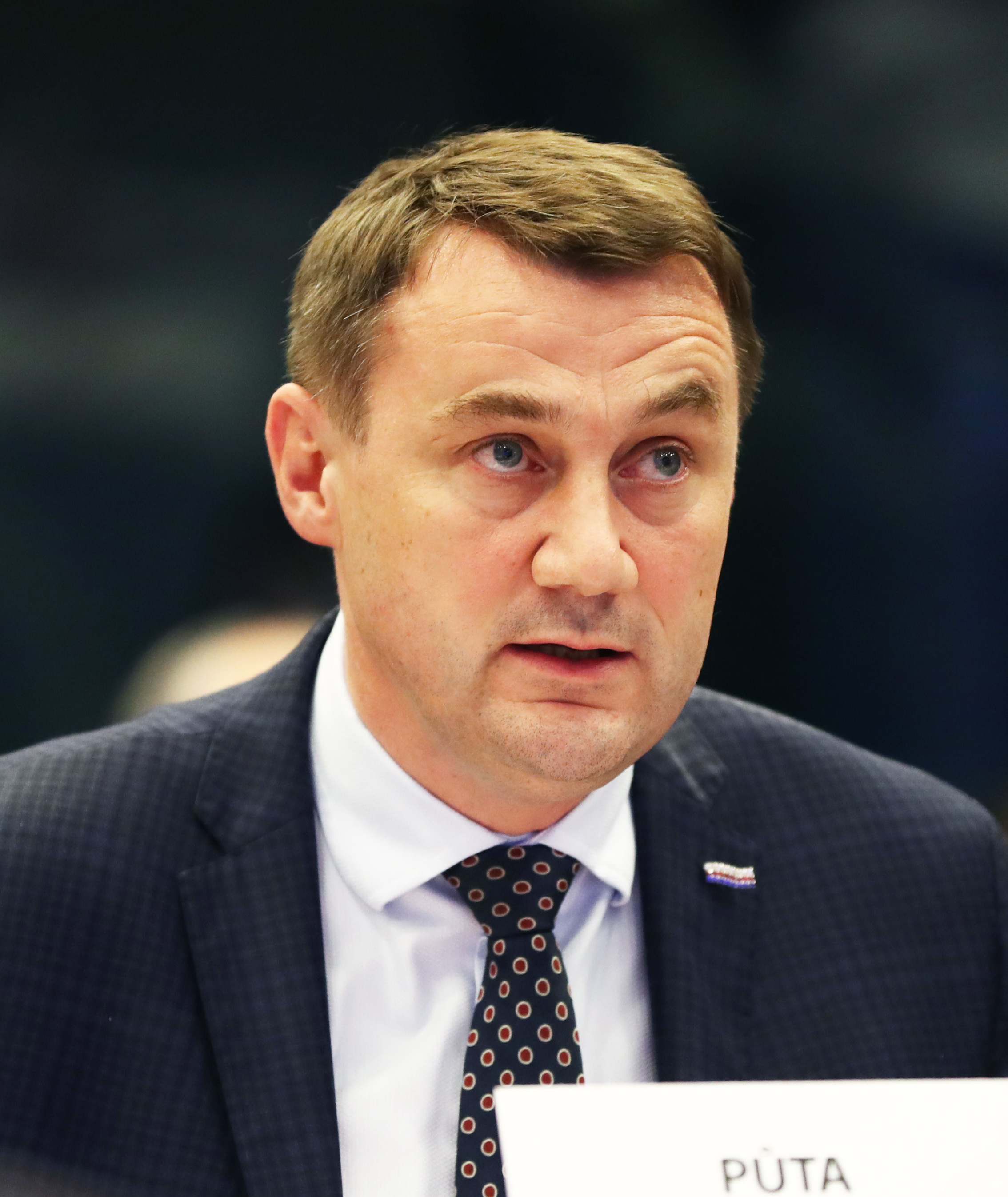

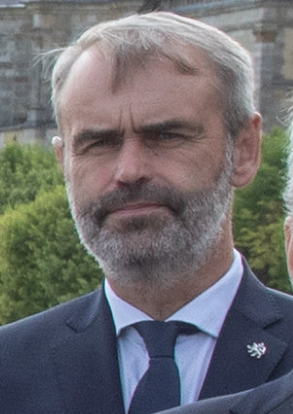
	First party	Second party	Third party
Leader	Andrej Babiš	Petr Fiala	Vít Rakušan
Party	ANO	ODS	STAN
Seats before	5	23	15
Seats won	8	5	5
Seats after	12	18	15
Seat change	▲7	▼5	Steady
	Fourth party	Fifth party	Sixth party
Leader	Marian Jurečka	Markéta Pekarová Adamová	Michal Šmarda
Party	KDU-ČSL	TOP 09	SOCDEM
Seats before	12	6	1
Seats won	2	2	1
Seats after	12	7	1
Seat change	Steady	▲1	Steady
	Seventh party	Eighth party	Ninth party
Leader	Václav Láska	Martin Půta	Robert Šlachta
Party	SEN 21	SLK	Přísaha
Last election		–	–
Seats before	4	2	0
Seats won	1	1	1
Seats after	4	3	1
Seat change	Steady	▲1	▲1
- Results by Senate constituency
Senate President before election
Miloš Vystrčil
ODS
Elected Senate President
Miloš Vystrčil
ODS

Senate elections for one-third of the Senate of the Czech Republic were held on 20–21 September 2024, with a second round on 27–28 September 2024. The first round was held alongside the regional elections.

With all votes counted, ANO 2011 won eight of the 27 contested seats (the most of any single party), while candidates backed by the governing parties won 15 seats and the governing coalition retained a majority in the 81-seat Senate. Voter turnout was 30.47% in the first round and 17.54% in the second round. The vote took place shortly after major flooding in Central Europe, and in some affected areas polling was organised in temporary venues such as tents or containers.

== Background ==
This Senate election is the second and last election to the Senate happening during the term of Petr Fiala's cabinet. The parties in the government coalition and their allies will defend 22 out of 27 seats. Opposition parties hold only two seats that are up for election, while three seats up for election are held by independents.

Immediately after the 2018 Senate elections, two senators elected as independents joined the Civic Democratic Party and TOP 09 caucus: Ladislav Faktor and Jitka Chalánková. Pavel Fischer remained formally independent.

During the 2018–2024 Senate term, one by-election was held in electoral district No. 32 (Teplice) in 2020; Hynek Hanza was elected in the second round.

Several unsuccessful candidates in the 2018 and 2023 Czech presidential elections will have their seats up for re-election, including Jiří Drahoš, Pavel Fischer and Marek Hilšer. The term of one member of the Fiala Cabinet, the Minister of Education Mikuláš Bek, is ending; Bek however decided not to stand for re-election.

== Electoral system ==
The Senate of the Czech Republic has 81 members elected in 81 single-member constituencies. One third of the seats is contested every two years, and senators serve six-year terms.

Senators are elected using a two-round system. A candidate who receives more than 50% of valid votes in the first round is elected. If no candidate reaches that threshold, a second round is held between the two candidates with the highest vote totals, and the candidate with the higher number of votes wins.

Candidates may be nominated by registered political parties or stand as independents, who must submit at least 1,000 signatures from voters in the constituency. The minimum age to stand for election is 40, and the voting age is 18.

== Contesting parties ==
Similar to the 2022 election, several parties have decided to form more or less formal alliances in some or all seats.

=== Spolu ===
Unlike two years prior, parties of the Spolu alliance have not signed any pre-electoral memorandum and are standing candidates mostly individually. Exception is Jiří Drahoš in Prague, who is supported by all parties in the Fiala government and Leopold Sukovský from Ostravak, whose candidacy is also supported by all three parties.

=== Pirates, SEN 21 and Greens ===
The Czech Pirate Party, SEN 21 and the Green Party agreed to cooperate and support mutually backed candidates in 10 of the 27 constituencies contested in 2024. The parties highlighted incumbent or prospective candidates including Přemysl Rabas (Chomutov) and Lukáš Wagenknecht (Prague 8), and said the Greens would field candidates in districts including Litoměřice and Mladá Boleslav.

=== Přísaha and Motorists ===
The coalition of Přísaha and Motorists have agreed to stand the leader of Přísaha as their joint candidate.

=== Composition of contested seats before the elections ===
Most seats up for the election, 13 out of 27, are held by the Spolu aliance, with 10 of these being held by ODS, two by KDU-ČSL and one by TOP 09. STAN lead bloc will defend seven seats and progressive pack composed of Pirates, SEN 21 and the Greens will be incumbent in two districts, with Pirates and SEN 21 defending one seat each

The opposition only holds two up the seats up in 2024, including the sole Senate seat held by SOCDEM in Karviná.

Three senators elected as independents will have their seats up for re-election, only two of them have chosen to contest the elections.

Current seats
Parties and alliances		Ideology	Leader	Seats	
Spolu	Civic Democratic Party	Conservatism	Petr Fiala	10 / 27	13 / 27
Spolu	KDU-ČSL	Christian democracy	Marian Jurečka	2 / 27	13 / 27
Spolu	TOP 09	Liberal conservatism	Markéta Pekarová Adamová	1 / 27	13 / 27
STAN and Independents	Mayors and Independents	Liberalism	Vít Rakušan	5 / 27	7 / 27
STAN and Independents	Ostravak	Local politics	Tomáš Málek	1 / 27	7 / 27
STAN and Independents	Marek Hilšer to the Senate	Liberalism	Marek Hilšer	1 / 27	7 / 27
ANO and SOCDEM	ANO 2011	Right-wing populism	Andrej Babiš	1 / 27	2 / 27
ANO and SOCDEM	Social Democracy	Social democracy	Michal Šmarda	1 / 27	2 / 27
Pirates, SEN 21 and Greens	SEN 21	Liberalism	Václav Láska	1 / 27	2 / 27
Pirates, SEN 21 and Greens	Czech Pirate Party	Pirate politics	Ivan Bartoš	1 / 27	2 / 27
Independent candidates				3 / 27	

== Results ==
In the first round, 19 of the ANO's candidates to the Senate advanced to the runoff, while two others were elected outright, along with one KDU-ČSL candidate, a TOP 09 candidate, and a member of Social Democracy. Twenty-two seats were to be contested in the second round.

At the end of the second round, the ANO won a total of eight seats, the party's strongest showing in a Senate election, while Spolu won 15.

=== Turnout ===
Turnout was 30.47% in the first round and 17.54% in the second round. The highest turnout in the second round was in the Opava electoral district (23.30%), and the lowest was in the Prostějov district (12.15%). A record five candidates were elected in the first round.

Party	First round			Second round			Seats			
Party	Votes	%	Seats	Votes	%	Seats	Won	Not up	Total	+/–
ANO 2011	224,350	28.27	2	157,287	40.27	6	8	4	12	+7
Civic Democratic Party	125,449	15.81	0	92,424	23.66	5	5	13	18	–5
Mayors and Independents	87,734	11.06	0	53,498	13.70	5	5	10	15	0
KDU-ČSL	46,518	5.86	1	15,635	4.00	1	2	10	12	0
TOP 09	44,320	5.59	1	17,457	4.47	1	2	5	7	+1
Freedom and Direct Democracy	42,733	5.39	0	3,318	0.85	0	0	0	0	0
Social Democracy	28,479	3.59	1				1	0	1	0
Czech Pirate Party	21,107	2.66	0				0	1	1	–1
Communist Party of Bohemia and Moravia	14,321	1.80	0	6,097	1.56	0	0	0	0	0
SEN 21	13,068	1.65	0	6,862	1.76	1	1	3	4	0
Svobodní	12,352	1.56	0				0	1	1	0
Mayors for the Liberec Region	8,491	1.07	0	14,299	3.66	1	1	2	3	+1
Přísaha	8,099	1.02	0	8,614	2.21	1	1	0	1	+1
Motorists for Themselves	7,664	0.97	0				0	0	0	New
Tricolour	7,490	0.94	0				0	0	0	0
Together for the Region	7,358	0.93	0				0	0	0	New
Tomáš Magnusek to the Senate	6,669	0.84	0				0	0	0	New
Green Party	6,472	0.82	0				0	0	0	0
Marek Hilšer to the Senate	5,617	0.71	0	5,298	1.36	0	0	0	0	–1
Ostravak	4,425	0.56	0				0	0	0	–1
Swiss Democracy	3,859	0.49	0				0	0	0	New
Liberal-Environmental Party	3,855	0.49	0				0	0	0	New
Pro Plzeň	3,778	0.48	0				0	0	0	New
Bright Signal of the Independents	3,604	0.45	0				0	0	0	New
Czech Sovereignty of Social Democracy	3,456	0.44	0				0	0	0	New
Alliance for the Future	3,139	0.40	0				0	0	0	New
A Better North	3,039	0.38	0				0	0	0	New
Independents	2,940	0.37	0				0	1	1	0
Choice for the Region	2,626	0.33	0				0	0	0	0
Czech National Social Party	2,576	0.32	0				0	0	0	New
Mayors and Personalities for Moravia	2,344	0.30	0				0	0	0	New
Right Choice	2,048	0.26	0				0	0	0	New
Law, Respect, Expertise	1,828	0.23	0				0	0	0	0
Non-Partisans for South Moravia	1,819	0.23	0				0	0	0	New
Safe Streets	1,584	0.20	0				0	0	0	New
Mourek – Political Party	1,380	0.17	0				0	0	0	New
Moravian Land Movement	1,170	0.15	0				0	0	0	0
MÍSTNÍ HNHRM	833	0.10	0				0	0	0	New
My Homeland Bohemia, Moravia, Silesia	752	0.09	0				0	0	0	New
With Heart For...	743	0.09	0				0	0	0	0
National Democracy	484	0.06	0				0	0	0	0
Civic-Political Foundation ReMeK	268	0.03	0				0	0	0	New
Alliance of National Forces	216	0.03	0				0	0	0	New
New Direction	121	0.02	0				0	0	0	New
Hradec Králové Democratic Club							–	1	1	0
ProMOST							–	1	1	0
Tábor 2020							–	1	1	0
Independents	22,311	2.81	0	9,812	2.51	1	1	1	2	–2
Total	793,489	100.00	5	390,601	100.00	22	27	54	81	0
Valid votes	793,489	97.70		390,601	99.48					
Invalid/blank votes	18,712	2.30		2,031	0.52					
Total votes	812,201	100.00		392,632	100.00					
Registered voters/turnout	2,693,038	30.16		2,239,246	17.53					
Source: Volby Volby
