= 2012 Czech Senate election =

Senate elections for a third of the Senate were held in the Czech Republic on 12 and 13 October 2012, with a second round of voting on 19 and 20 October.

== Results ==
Nominating party	First round			Second round			Total seats
Nominating party	Votes	%	Seats	Votes	%	Seats	Total seats
Czech Social Democratic Party	206,327	23.47	0	207,064	40.28	13	13
Communist Party of Bohemia and Moravia	153,335	17.44	0	79,663	15.50	1	1
Civic Democratic Party	151,950	17.28	0	117,990	22.95	4	4
KDU-ČSL	73,685	8.38	0	25,266	4.91	2	2
TOP 09	46,983	5.34	0				0
Mayors and Independents	33,938	3.86	0	21,413	4.17	2	2
Green Party	18,391	2.09	0	10,756	2.09	1	1
Party of Free Citizens	15,588	1.77	0				0
ANO 2011	14,503	1.65	0				0
Party of Civic Rights	10,894	1.24	0				0
Severočeši.cz	9,202	1.05	0				0
National Socialists – Left of the 21st century	8,874	1.01	0				0
Ostravak	8,364	0.95	0	9,232	1.80	1	1
SNK European Democrats	8,309	0.95	0				0
Party of Common Sense	8,036	0.91	0				0
Czech Pirate Party	7,947	0.90	0	11,807	2.30	1	1
Public Affairs	6,285	0.71	0				0
State Party Direct Democracy – Labour Party	5,744	0.65	0				0
Freeholder Party of the Czech Republic	5,742	0.65	0				0
United Democrats – Association of Independents	5,145	0.59	0				0
Communist Party of Czechoslovakia	4,296	0.49	0				0
New Future for the Liberec Region	4,027	0.46	0				0
For the Region	3,487	0.40	0				0
Czech Sovereignty	3,476	0.40	0				0
Conservative Party	2,789	0.32	0				0
Mayors and Personalities for Moravia	2,342	0.27	0				0
Fair Play – HNPD	2,289	0.26	0				0
Non-Partisans	1,857	0.21	0				0
Holidays for Your Rights	1,736	0.20	0				0
Dissatisfied Citizens!	1,545	0.18	0				0
Semilaci	1,199	0.14	0				0
Moravané	589	0.07	0				0
Balbín's Poetic Party	434	0.05	0				0
Koruna Česká	319	0.04	0				0
Czech National Social Party	311	0.04	0				0
Conservative Alternative	135	0.02	0				0
Independents	49,149	5.59	0	30,901	6.01	2	2
Total	879,222	100.00	0	514,092	100.00	27	27
Valid votes	879,222	90.97		514,092	98.87		
Invalid/blank votes	87,242	9.03		5,855	1.13		
Total votes	966,464	100.00		519,947	100.00		
Registered voters/turnout	2,795,405	34.57		2,796,196	18.59		
Source: Volby
