= Four-Coalition =

Four-Coalition Čtyřkoalice
- Leader: Cyril Svoboda
- Founded: 1998
- Dissolved: 2002
- Ideology: Liberal conservatism Christian democracy Pro-Europeanism
- Political position: Centre-right
- Member parties: KDU–ČSL; US; DEU; ODA

The Four-Coalition (Czech: Čtyřkoalice), also translated as the Coalition of Four or Quad-Coalition, abbreviated to 4K, was a liberal centre-right political alliance in the Czech Republic between 1998 and 2002.

The four member parties were:

- Christian and Democratic Union – Czechoslovak People's Party (KDU–ČSL), an established, large Christian democratic party
- Freedom Union (US), a new, large conservative liberal party that split from the Civic Democrats
- Democratic Union (DEU), an established, small liberal party
- Civic Democratic Alliance (ODA), an established, small liberal conservative party

== Member parties ==
Party	Ideology	Position	Seats in the Chamber of Deputies	
Party	Ideology	Position	1998	2002
Christian and Democratic Union – Czechoslovak People's Party	Christian democracy	Centre to centre-right	20 / 200	22 / 200
Freedom Union	Social liberalism	Centre-right	19 / 200	9 / 200
Civic Democratic Alliance	Conservative liberalism	Centre-right	0 / 200	0 / 200
Democratic Union	Liberalism	Centre-right	0 / 200	Merged with US

== History ==
The 4K was formed after the Opposition Agreement between the Czech Social Democratic Party and Civic Democratic Party (ODS), in the aftermath of the 1998 legislative election. The coalition said it aimed to provide 'real opposition' to the government. The parties first participated together in the 1998 Senate election, winning 13 of the 27 seats up for election.

The coalition formalised and centralised, with the merger of US and DEU to form the Freedom Union – Democratic Union (US-DEU) reducing the number of parties to three. However, the overbearing size of the KDU–ČSL – significantly larger than the others – lent instability to the coalition, as KDU–ČSL members used the coalition to promote their intra-party factions. KDU–ČSL put pressure on ODA to consolidate further, either reforming its long-standing debts or merging with US-DEU. ODA refused, and withdrew from the Four-Coalition as a result.

In the 2002 legislative election, KDU–ČSL and US-DEU ran on a looser joint ticket called Coalition (Koalice), and won 31 seats with 14% of the vote—down from the combined 39 seats and 19% of votes in the 1998 election.

== Election results ==
=== Chamber of Deputies ===
Year	Vote	Vote %	Seats	Place	Notes	Position
2002	680,670	14.27	31 / 200	4th	Ran as Coalition.	Government

=== Senate ===
Election	First round			Second round			Seats
Election	Votes	%	Places^{*}	Votes	%	Places^{*}	Seats
1998	255,785	26.6	2nd	166,483	31.0	2nd	13 / 27
2000	234,879	27.3	1st	247,197	43.9	1st	17 / 27
2002	107,737	16.1	4th	83,343	10.1	3rd	2 / 27

^{*} Places are by number of votes gained.

=== Regional Assemblies ===
Year	Vote	Vote %	Seats	Places
2000	537,012	22.9	171 / 675	2nd
