= 1996 Czech Senate election =

- 15–16 November 1996 (first round); 22–23 November 1996 (second round)
	First party	Second party	Third party
Leader	Václav Klaus	Miloš Zeman	Josef Lux
Party	ODS	ČSSD	Christian and Democratic Union – Czechoslovak People's Party
Seats won	32	25	13
First round	1,006,036; 36.48%	559,304; 20.28%	274,316; 9.95%
Second round	1,134,044; 49.15%	733,713; 31.80%	247,819; 10.74%
	Fourth party	Fifth party
Leader	Jan Kalvoda	Miroslav Grebeníček
Party	ODA	KSČM
Seats won	7	2
First round	222,319; 8.06%	393,494; 14.27%
Second round	119,730; 5.19%	45,304; 1.96%

Senate elections were held in the Czech Republic for the first time on 15 and 16 November 1996, with a second round on 22 and 23 November. the first after independence. The Civic Democratic Party emerged as the largest party, winning 32 of the 81 seats. Voter turnout was 35% in the first round and 31% in the second.

This was the only time Senate elections were held in all 81 single-member constituencies at the same time. Senators elected in 1996 were divided into three classes depending on number of their constituencies to determine which Senate seats would be up for election in 1998, 2000 and 2002. Senators in the Czech Republic are elected for six-year terms, with one-third being renewed every two years.

The elections were held using the two-round system, with an absolute majority required to be elected.

== Opinion polls ==
Date	Polling firm	ODS	ČSSD	KSČM	KDU-ČSL	ODA	SPR-RSČ	Others/Undecided
August 1996	IVVM	15.7	10.4	3.0	2.6	1.5	0.9	65.9
September 1996	IVVM	38.4	21.0	15.3	8.4	6.6	2.3	8.0
October 1996	IVVM	34.6	25.7	12.3	11.2	8.6	1.1	6.6
November 1996	IVVM	40.8	24.1	11.8	9.9	8.0	1.6	3.8

== Results ==
Party	First round			Second round			Total seats
Party	Votes	%	Seats	Votes	%	Seats	Total seats
Civic Democratic Party	1,006,036	36.48	3	1,134,044	49.15	29	32
Czech Social Democratic Party	559,304	20.28	0	733,713	31.80	25	25
Communist Party of Bohemia and Moravia	393,494	14.27	0	45,304	1.96	2	2
KDU-ČSL	274,316	9.95	1	247,819	10.74	12	13
Civic Democratic Alliance	222,319	8.06	0	119,730	5.19	7	7
Free Democrats – Liberal National Social Party	43,895	1.59	0				0
Moravian–Silesian Coalition 96	26,643	0.97	0				0
Democratic Union	24,454	0.89	0	14,656	0.64	1	1
Green Party	21,146	0.77	0				0
Party for Life Security	16,793	0.61	0				0
Independents	13,442	0.49	0				0
Club of Committed Non-Party Members	5,309	0.19	0				0
Masaryk Democratic Party	4,272	0.15	0				0
Party of the Democratic Left	4,241	0.15	0				0
Right Bloc	4,238	0.15	0				0
Left	3,164	0.11	0				0
Independent Initiative	2,565	0.09	0				0
Right Alternative	2,332	0.08	0				0
Coexistence	1,794	0.07	0				0
Communist Party of Czechoslovakia	1,640	0.06	0				0
Czech Right	1,599	0.06	0				0
Republican Union	1,299	0.05	0				0
National Active Citizens	1,221	0.04	0				0
Republican Party of Agricultural and Smallholder People	1,181	0.04	0				0
Party of Entrepreneurs, Sole Traders and Peasants	901	0.03	0				0
Humanist Party	715	0.03	0				0
Republican Party	695	0.03	0				0
Prague Residents	482	0.02	0				0
Party of Small Business Owners	431	0.02	0				0
Democrats 92	288	0.01	0				0
Roma Civic Initiative	262	0.01	0				0
Eastern European National Political Movement	13	0.00	0				0
Independents	117,641	4.27	0	11,993	0.52	1	1
Total	2,758,125	100.00	4	2,307,259	100.00	77	81
Valid votes	2,758,125	98.82		2,307,259	99.30		
Invalid/blank votes	32,960	1.18		16,182	0.70		
Total votes	2,791,085	100.00		2,323,441	100.00		
Registered voters/turnout	7,992,740	34.92		7,594,316	30.59		
Source: Nohlen & Stöver, Czech Statistical Office
