= 2000 Czech Senate election =

Senate elections were held in the Czech Republic on 12 November 2000, with a second round on 19 November. The result was a victory for the Civic Democratic Party, which won 22 of the 81 seats. Voter turnout was 33.4% in the first round and 21.5% in the second.

== Opinion polls ==
Date	Polling firm	ODS	4K	ČSSD	KSČM	Others	Undecided
4 - 9 October 2000	STEM	36.0	23.0	18.0	16.0	5.0	30.0

== Results ==
Party	First round			Second round			Seats			
Party	Votes	%	Seats	Votes	%	Seats	Won	Not up	Total	+/–
Four-Coalition	236,861	27.53	1	247,197	43.87	16	17	22	39	+13
Civic Democratic Party	203,039	23.60	0	166,133	29.48	8	8	14	22	–4
Communist Party of Bohemia and Moravia	152,934	17.77	0	73,372	13.02	0	0	3	3	–1
Czech Social Democratic Party	151,943	17.66	0	53,503	9.49	1	1	14	15	–8
Independents	10,348	1.20	0				0	0	0	0
Czech National Social Party	8,726	1.01	0				0	0	0	0
Right Bloc	5,523	0.64	0				0	0	0	0
Actions for Real Democracy	4,073	0.47	0				0	0	0	New
Vote for the City	2,888	0.34	0				0	0	0	New
National Active Citizens	2,401	0.28	0				0	0	0	New
Party for Life Security	1,506	0.18	0				0	0	0	New
Independents for Moravia	1,255	0.15	0				0	0	0	New
Union for Europe	970	0.11	0				0	0	0	New
Green Party	850	0.10	0				0	0	0	0
National Democratic Party	600	0.07	0				0	0	0	New
Right Alternative	520	0.06	0				0	0	0	0
Party of Conservative Accord	352	0.04	0				0	0	0	0
Conservative Alternative	262	0.03	0				0	0	0	New
Young Democrats	185	0.02	0				0	0	0	Mew
Independents	75,206	8.74	0	23,319	4.14	1	1	1	2	+2
Total	860,442	100.00	1	563,524	100.00	26	27	54	81	0
Valid votes	860,442	94.23		563,524	99.32					
Invalid/blank votes	52,698	5.77		3,867	0.68					
Total votes	913,140	100.00		567,391	100.00					
Registered voters/turnout	2,730,142	33.45		2,633,794	21.54					
Source: Nohlen & Stöver, Volby
