= 2006 Czech Senate election =

Senate elections were held in the Czech Republic on 20 and 21 October 2006, with a second round on 27 and 28 October. The result was a victory for the Civic Democratic Party, which won 41 of the 81 seats. Voter turnout was 41% in the first round and just 21% in the second.

== Results ==
Nominating party	First round			Second round			Seats		
Nominating party	Votes	%	Seats	Votes	%	Seats	Won	Not up	Total
Civic Democratic Party	354,273	33.31	0	289,568	50.40	14	14	27	41
Czech Social Democratic Party	204,573	19.23	0	120,127	20.91	6	6	6	12
Communist Party of Bohemia and Moravia	134,863	12.68	0	26,001	4.53	0	0	2	2
KDU-ČSL	131,307	12.35	0	59,603	10.37	4	4	6	10
Green Party	50,508	4.75	0	8,044	1.40	0	0	1	1
SNK European Democrats	31,711	2.98	0				0	3	3
Freedom Union – Democratic Union	21,360	2.01	0	7,367	1.28	0	0	1	1
Party for the Open Society	13,662	1.28	0	14,120	2.46	1	1	0	1
Head Up – Electoral Bloc	12,639	1.19	0				0	0	0
Vote for the City	10,362	0.97	0	9,215	1.60	0	0	0	0
Independent Democrats	9,901	0.93	0				0	0	0
Independent Mayors for the Region	7,548	0.71	0	8,754	1.52	1	1	0	1
Conservative Party	7,490	0.70	0				0	0	0
Independents	5,826	0.55	0				0	2	2
Greens	4,959	0.47	0	8,113	1.41	0	0	0	0
HNHRM	4,856	0.46	0				0	1	1
Independent Vote	4,783	0.45	0				0	0	0
Non-Partisans	4,624	0.43	0				0	0	0
Rural Party – United Civic Forces	3,401	0.32	0				0	0	0
Celý plat senátora na zdravotn.našeho obvodu	2,847	0.27	0				0	0	0
Czech Right	2,720	0.26	0				0	0	0
Equal Opportunities Party	1,840	0.17	0				0	0	0
Mayors and Personalities for Moravia	1,646	0.15	0				0	0	0
Independents for Prague	1,509	0.14	0				0	0	0
Civic Democratic Alliance	1,341	0.13	0				0	1	1
Social Democratic Orientation Club	942	0.09	0				0	0	0
Club of Committed Non-Party Members	775	0.07	0				0	0	0
Party of Common Sense	689	0.06	0				0	0	0
Humanist Party	345	0.03	0				0	0	0
Koruna Česká	272	0.03	0				0	0	0
State Party Direct Democracy – Labour Party	230	0.02	0				0	0	0
4 VIZE	175	0.02	0				0	0	0
Independent Initiative	104	0.01	0				0	0	0
Liberal Reform Party							–	1	1
Path of Change							–	1	1
United Democrats – Association of Independents							–	1	1
Independents	29,533	2.78	0	23,643	4.12	1	1	1	2
Total	1,063,614	100.00	0	574,555	100.00	27	27	54	81
Valid votes	1,063,614	93.28		574,555	99.70				
Invalid/blank votes	76,633	6.72		1,737	0.30				
Total votes	1,140,247	100.00		576,292	100.00				
Registered voters/turnout	2,780,914	41.00		2,781,827	20.72				
Source: Nohlen & Stöver, Volby, IPU
