= Senate district 27 – Prague 1 =

Electoral district in the Czech Republic

Coordinates: 50°06′13″N 14°24′27″E

27 – Prague 1
- inline Senate district of the Czech Republic

- The Prague-1 district on a map
- Senator: Jiří Padevět; STAN
- Region: Prague
- District: Capital City of Prague
- Electorate: 83 503
- Last election: 2026
- Next election: 2032

Senate district 27 – Prague 1 is an electoral district of the Senate of the Czech Republic, located in part of the Capital City of Prague. From 2026 onwards, Jiří Padevět, a STAN nominee, is the Senator for the district.

== Senators ==
Year	Senator	Party
1996	Václav Benda	ODS
1999	Václav Fischer	Independent
2002	Martin Mejstřík	CZ
2008	Zdeněk Schwarz	ODS
2014	Václav Hampl	KDU-ČSL
2020	Miroslava Němcová	ODS
2026	Jiří Padevět	STAN

== Election results ==
=== 1998 ===
1996 Czech Senate election in Prague 1
Candidate	Party	1st round		2nd round	
Candidate	Party	Votes	%	Votes	%
Václav Benda	ODS	18 878	39,97	21 106	55,67
Pavel Tigrid	KDU-ČSL	9 169	19,41	16 808	44,33
Jiří Dienstbier	SD-LSNS	7 789	16,49	—	—
Marie Petrová	ČSSD	5 101	10,80	—	—
Čestmír Kubát	KSČM	2 813	5,96	—	—
Vlastimil Venclík	NEZ	1 228	2,60	—	—
Vladimír Hruška	MDS	1 066	2,26	—	—
Čestmír Čejka	ODA	718	1,52	—	—
Vladimír Nechanický	RU	244	0,52	—	—
Vasil Mohorita	SDL	116	0,25	—	—
Vlastislav Kotouček	PB	92	0,19	—	—
Vojtěch Makula	VENPH	13	0,03	—	—

=== 1999 ===
1999 Czech senate by-election in Prague 1
Candidate	Party	1st round	
Candidate	Party	Votes	%
Václav Fischer	Independent	22 461	71,42
Jiřina Jirásková	ODS	3 844	12,19
Ivan Medek	4KOALICE	2 948	9,35
Stanislav Fischer	KSČM	1 752	5,47
Karel Srp	ČSSD	327	1,04
Elvíra Tomášková	SV	130	0,41
Richard Knot	NEI	48	0,15
Otakar Tyl	RU	46	0,15

=== 2002 ===
2002 Czech Senate election in Prague 1
Candidate	Party	1st round		2nd round	
Candidate	Party	Votes	%	Votes	%
Martin Mejstřík	CZ	3 651	13,05	18 087	55,96
Petr Weiss	ODS	8 370	29,93	14 223	44,03
Jiří Kotalík	SNK	3 102	11,10	—	—
Irena Ondráčková	ČSSD	2 758	9,86	—	—
Noemi Zárubová	KDU-ČSL	2 576	9,21	—	—
Karel Sýs	KSČM	1 984	7,09	—	—
Petr Cibulka	PB	1 782	6,37	—	—
Slavomil Hubálek	N	1 348	4,82	—	—
John Bok	ANEO	1 247	4,55	—	—
Jiří Tráva	ED	883	3,15	—	—
Jiří Hanzlíček	ČSNS	187	0,66	—	—
Eduard Katzer	SV SOS	40	0,14	—	—

=== 2008 ===
2008 Czech Senate election in Prague 1
Candidate	Party	1st round		2nd round	
Candidate	Party	Votes	%	Votes	%
Zdeněk Schwarz	ODS	7 946	25,78	15 399	60,21
Blanka Haindlová	ČSSD	5 490	17,81	10 175	39,78
Michael Kocáb	SZ	4 742	15,38	—	—
Martin Stránský	VV	3 704	12,01	—	—
Pavel Klener	KDU-ČSL	3 645	11,82	—	—
Martin Mejstřík	US-DEU	2 679	8,69	—	—
Dagmar Gušlbauerová	KSČM	1 887	6,12	—	—
Bohumil Vejtasa	S.O.S. PRAHA	479	1,55	—	—
Petr Hannig	SZR, ČSNS 2005	245	0,79	—	—

=== 2014 ===
2014 Czech Senate election in Prague 1
Candidate	Party	1st round		2nd round	
Candidate	Party	Votes	%	Votes	%
Václav Hampl	KDU-ČSL, SZ	8 588	27,19	10 579	68,44
Zdeněk Schwarz	ODS	6 411	20,30	4 878	31,55
Martin Bursík	TOP 09	4 994	15,81	—	—
Laura Janáčková	ANO 2011	4 189	13,26	—	—
Petr Pavlík	ČSSD	2 803	8,87	—	—
Dagmar Gušlbauerová	KSČM	1 106	3,50	—	—
Aleš Rykl	Svobodní	1 028	3,25	—	—
Eva Jurinová	Republika	579	1,83	—	—
Miloslav Dočekal	SNK ED	560	1,77	—	—
Ivo Kasal	ABS	347	1,09	—	—
Petr Šefl	Úsvit	319	1,01	—	—
Vladimír Stwora	ND	197	0,62	—	—
Milan Jurových	SPO	187	0,59	—	—
Zdeňka Chromíková	DOMOV	147	0,46	—	—
Rudolf Mládek	O.K. party	125	0,39	—	—

=== 2020 ===
2020 Czech Senate election in Prague 1
Candidate	Party	1st round		2nd round	
Candidate	Party	Votes	%	Votes	%
Miroslava Němcová	ODS, STAN, TOP 09	15 593	48,56	13 279	63,96
Václav Hampl	KDU-ČSL, Greens, PRAHA SOBĚ, SEN 21	6 579	20,49	7 481	36,03
Robert Veverka	Pirates	2 949	9,18	—	—
Petr Fejk	IO	2 827	8,80	—	—
Ivo T. Budil	Tricolour	1 324	4,12	—	—
Milan Urban	SPD	1 068	3,32	—	—
Jakub Štědroň	ČSSD	1 041	3,24	—	—
Václav Fischer	NEI	725	2,25	—	—

=== 2026 ===
2026 Czech Senate election in Prague 1
Candidate	Party	1st round		2nd round	
Candidate	Party	Votes	%	Votes	%
Jiří Padevět	STAN, ODS, TOP 09, Pirates	17 576	49,64	13 207	66,65
Jan Čižinský	PRAHA SOBĚ, KDU-ČSL, Greens, SEN 21	9 824	27,74	6 608	33,34
Ján Dudra	ANO 2011	4 329	12,22	—	—
Pavel Čižinský	The Left	1 028	2,90	—	—
Pavel Pešek	Swiss Democracy	929	2,62	—	—
Jiří Morštadt	Generation Movement	597	1,68	—	—
Vojtěch Ryvola	GEN	490	1,38	—	—
Jan Štern	JSME TEAM	347	0,98	—	—
Vladimír Kolman	SOCDEM	286	0,80	—	—
