= Senate district 75 – Karviná =

Electoral district in the Czech Republic

75 – Karviná
- inline Senate district of the Czech Republic

- The Karviná district on a map
- Senator: Petr Kazík; OK
- Region: Moravian-Silesian
- District: Karviná
- Last election: 2026
- Next election: 2032

Senate district 75 – Karviná is an electoral district of the Senate of the Czech Republic, located in part of the Karviná District. Since 2026, the Senator for the district has been Petr Kazík of OK.

== Senators ==
Year	Senator	Party
1996	Antonín Petráš	KSČM
2002	Eduard Matykiewicz	KSČM
2008	Radek Sušil	ČSSD
2014	Radek Sušil	ČSSD
2020	Ondřej Feber	ANO 2011
2026	Petr Kazík	OK

== Election results ==
=== 1996 ===
1996 Czech Senate election in Karviná
Candidate	Party	1st round		2nd round	
Candidate	Party	Votes	%	Votes	%
Antonín Petráš	KSČM	5 723	28,16	7 755	52,25
Bohumír Bobák	ČSSD	5 422	26,68	7 088	47,75
Zdeněk Vajter	ODS	3 818	18,79	—	—
Bohuslav Chwajol	ODA	2 262	11,13	—	—
František Pluhař	Independent	994	4,89	—	—
Jacques Trojan	KDU-ČSL	943	4,64	—	—
Ladislav Žáček	SŽJ	849	4,18	—	—
Jaroslav Dadok	MSLK 96	310	1,53	—	—

=== 2002 ===
2002 Czech Senate election in Karviná
Candidate	Party	1st round		2nd round	
Candidate	Party	Votes	%	Votes	%
Eduard Matykiewicz	KSČM	4 020	28,79	9 469	51,81
Petr Trojek	ODS	3 506	25,10	8 805	48,18
Karin Němcová	ČSSD	2 892	20,71	—	—
Josef Byrtus	KDU-ČSL	1 385	9,91	—	—
Květuše Szyroká	SNK	1 382	9,89	—	—
Vavřinec Fójcik	CZ	778	5,57	—	—

=== 2008 ===
2008 Czech Senate election in Karviná
Candidate	Party	Votes	%
Radek Sušil	ČSSD	15 254	53,34
Eduard Matykiewicz	KSČM	4 844	16,94
Ondřej Feber	Independent	4 005	14,00
Petr Trojek	ODS	3 750	13,11
Peter Halák	SZ	569	1,98
Vladimír Pelc	SDŽ	172	0,60

=== 2014 ===
2014 Czech Senate election in Karviná
Candidate	Party	1st round		2nd round	
Candidate	Party	Votes	%	Votes	%
Radek Sušil	ČSSD	8 503	35,73	6 066	62,63
Martin Gebauer	ANO 2011	5 129	21,55	3 618	37,36
Tomaš Gallik	KSČM	4 647	19,53	—	—
Česlava Lukaštíková	NEZ	2 170	9,11	—	—
Vladislav Szkandera	KDU-ČSL	2 085	8,76	—	—
Werner Bernatík	ODS	1 260	5,29	—	—

=== 2020 ===
2020 Czech Senate election in Karviná
Candidate	Party	1st round		2nd round	
Candidate	Party	Votes	%	Votes	%
Ondřej Feber	ANO 2011	5 852	26,12	3 412	50,62
Radek Sušil	ČSSD	3 335	14,88	3 328	49,37
Radim Kravčík	Pirates	2 451	10,94	—	—
Miroslav Chlubna	NEZ	2 184	9,75	—	—
Zdena Černínová	KSČM	1 943	8,67	—	—
Marian Lebiedzik	DV 2016	1 684	7,51	—	—
Naděžda Franková	SPD	1 648	7,35	—	—
Radomír Prus	Independent	1 170	5,22	—	—
Daniel Placzek	Tricolour	821	3,66	—	—
Lubomír Kuznik	VOK	657	2,93	—	—
Eliška Lazarová	ANK 2020	343	1,53	—	—
Karel Světnička	MS Pirates	236	1,05	—	—
Radoslav Štědroň	UNIFIED	75	0,33	—	—

=== 2026 ===
2026 Czech Senate election in Karviná
Candidate	Party	1st round		2nd round	
Candidate	Party	Votes	%	Votes	%
Petr Kazík	OK	3 411	14,31	5 836	52,93
Lenka Brzyszkowská	ANO 2011	8 009	33,62	5 188	47,06
Mariam Szyja	Pirates, TOP 09, SEN 21, Greens, STAN	3 361	14,10	—	—
Aleš Polách	ODS, Freeholders	3 316	13,92	—	—
Pavel Staněk	SPD	2 961	12,43	—	—
Roman Galia	SOCDEM	2 170	9,10	—	—
Karel Světnička	JaSaN	593	2,48	—	—
