= Senate district 36 – Česká Lípa =

Electoral district in the Czech Republic

36 – Česká Lípa
- inline Senate district of the Czech Republic

- The Česká Lípa district on a map
- Senator: Martin Půta; SLK
- Region: Liberec; Central Bohemia
- District: Česká Lípa; Mělník; Liberec
- Electorate: 116,702
- Area: 1,403.08 km²
- Last election: 2026
- Next election: 2032

Senate district 36 – Česká Lípa is an electoral district of the Senate of the Czech Republic, located in the entirety of the Česká Lípa District and parts of Mělník and Liberec districts. From 2026 onwards, Martin Půta, an Mayors for the Liberec Region member, is the Senator for the district.

== Senators ==
Year	Senator	Party
1996	Miroslav Coufal	ČSSD
2002	Karel Tejnora	ODS
2008	Karel Kapoun	ČSSD
2014	Jiří Vosecký	SLK
2020	Jiří Vosecký	SLK
2026	Martin Půta	SLK

== Election results ==
=== 1996 ===
1996 Czech Senate election in Česká Lípa
Candidate	Party	1st round		2nd round	
Candidate	Party	Votes	%	Votes	%
Miroslav Coufal	ČSSD	5 888	21,65	12 980	52,86
Filip Šedivý	ODS	9 154	33,66	11 575	47,14
Ladislav Lis	Independent	5 114	18,80	—	—
Miroslav Starý	KSČM	3 576	13,15	—	—
Miroslav Čerbák	ODA	2 168	7,97	—	—
Jaroslav Čarnogurský	CAO	845	3,11	—	—
Josef Procházka	NEI	454	1,67	—	—

=== 2002 ===
2002 Czech Senate election in Česká Lípa
Candidate	Party	1st round		2nd round	
Candidate	Party	Votes	%	Votes	%
Karel Tejnora	ODS	6 863	35,73	13 155	52,73
Miroslav Coufal	ČSSD	4 945	25,74	11 791	47,26
Václav Svatek	KSČM	3 720	19,36	—	—
Bohuslav Rychtařík	SNK ED	2 375	12,36	—	—
Stanislav Ludvík	US-DEU	1 304	6,78	—	—

=== 2008 ===
2008 Czech Senate election in Česká Lípa
Candidate	Party	1st round		2nd round	
Candidate	Party	Votes	%	Votes	%
Karel Kapoun	ČSSD	8 574	27,76	15 762	59,53
Petr Skokan	ODS	9 918	32,11	10 711	40,46
Miloš Tita	KSČM	4 877	15,79	—	—
Jaromír Dvořák	SOS	2 822	9,13	—	—
Miroslav Hudec	SZ	2 030	6,57	—	—
František Novosad	SNK ED	1 439	4,65	—	—
Oldřich Němec	SDŽ	1 226	3,96	—	—

=== 2014 ===
2014 Czech Senate election in Česká Lípa
Candidate	Party	1st round		2nd round	
Candidate	Party	Votes	%	Votes	%
Jiří Vosecký	SLK	6 633	20,14	8 246	59,32
Karel Kapoun	ČSSD	6 130	18,61	5 653	40,67
Karel Tejnora	ODS	5 250	15,94	—	—
Milan Adamec	ANO 2011	5 103	15,50	—	—
Jan Dvořák	KSČM	3 421	10,39	—	—
Miroslav Coufal	SPO	2 787	8,46	—	—
Josef Jadrný	SZ	1 616	4,91	—	—
Libor Kleibl	ZSP	1 104	3,35	—	—
Oldřich Voženílek	Svobodní	888	2,70	—	—

=== 2020 ===
2020 Czech Senate election in Česká Lípa
Candidate	Party	1st round		2nd round	
Candidate	Party	Votes	%	Votes	%
Jiří Vosecký	SLK, STAN	10 418	29,59	6 988	52,87
Vít Vomáčka	ODS	5 381	15,28	6 228	47,12
Petr Jeník	Pirates	3 568	10,13	—	—
Jan Riedl	Independent	3 056	8,68	—	—
Libor Křenek	SPD	2 682	7,61	—	—
Petr Skokan	SPOLEHNUTÍ	2 547	7,23	—	—
Miloš Tita	KSČM	2 310	6,56	—	—
Libor Šmejda	TOP 09, KDU-ČSL, SEN 21	2 221	6,30	—	—
Jaroslav Křupala	ČSSD	1 775	5,04	—	—
Jiří Štěrba	Tricolour	1 243	3,53	—	—

=== 2026 ===
2026 Czech Senate election in Česká Lípa
Candidate	Party	1st round		2nd round	
Candidate	Party	Votes	%	Votes	%
Martin Půta	SLK	14 052	32,66	14 287	55,75
Jitka Volfová	ANO 2011	15 078	35,05	11 339	44,24
Jiří Vosecký	Independent	6 429	14,94	—	—
Vít Vomáčka	ODS	5 753	13,37	—	—
Leoš Hamrský	KSČM	1 701	3,95	—	—
