= Senate district 21 – Prague 5 =

Electoral district in the Czech Republic

Coordinates: 50°02′02″N 14°20′32″E

21 – Prague 5
- inline Senate district of the Czech Republic

- The Prague-5 district on a map
- Senator: Václav Láska; SEN 21
- Region: Prague
- District: Capital City of Prague
- Electorate: 103867
- Area: 64.59 km²
- Last election: 2026
- Next election: 2032

Senate district 21 – Prague is an electoral district of the Senate of the Czech Republic, located in part of the Capital City of Prague From 2014 onwards, Václav Láska, a SEN 21 chairman, is the Senator for the district.

== Senators ==
| Year | Senator | Party |
|---|---|---|
| 1996 | Michael Žantovský | ODA |
| 2002 | Miroslav Škaloud | ODS |
| 2008 | Miroslav Škaloud | ODS |
| 2014 | Václav Láska | SZ |
| 2020 | Václav Láska | SEN 21 |
| 2026 | Václav Láska | SEN 21 |

== Election results ==
1996 Czech Senate election in Prague 5
| Candidate | Party | 1st round | | 2nd round | |
| Candidate | Party | Votes | % | Votes | % |
|---|---|---|---|---|---|
| Michael Žantovský | ODA | 16 047 | 36,55 | 21 496 | 56,07 |
| Petr Bratský | ODS | 17 002 | 38,72 | 16 840 | 43,93 |
| Jaroslav Fajstavr | ČSSD | 6 921 | 15,76 | — | — |
| Miloš Valášek | KSČM | 2 532 | 5,77 | — | — |
| Jaroslav Šesták | NEZ | 462 | 1,05 | — | — |
| Antonín Dušek | PB | 357 | 0,81 | — | — |
| Ladislav Blažek | PP | 249 | 0,57 | — | — |
| Eduard Kulhánek | HS | 239 | 0,54 | — | — |
| Jan Kukačka | CAO | 100 | 0,23 | — | — |

=== 2002 ===
2002 Czech Senate election in Prague 5
| Candidate | Party | 1st round | | 2nd round | |
| Candidate | Party | Votes | % | Votes | % |
|---|---|---|---|---|---|
| Miroslav Škaloud | ODS | 11 342 | 42,01 | 17 613 | 56,20 |
| Václav Krása | US-DEU | 6 998 | 25,92 | 13 724 | 43,79 |
| Jan Obst | ČSSD | 3 316 | 12,28 | — | — |
| Karel Janda | KSČM | 2 398 | 8,88 | — | — |
| Jaroslav Staněk | SZ | 1 898 | 7,03 | — | — |
| Jozef Wagner | OK | 1 043 | 3,86 | — | — |

=== 2008 ===
2008 Czech Senate election in Prague 5
| Candidate | Party | 1st round | | 2nd round | |
| Candidate | Party | Votes | % | Votes | % |
|---|---|---|---|---|---|
| Miroslav Škaloud | ODS | 10 104 | 27,76 | 17 260 | 54,01 |
| Jiří Witzany | ČSSD | 8 128 | 22,33 | 14 697 | 45,98 |
| Helena Illnerová | SZ | 6 741 | 18,52 | — | — |
| Marie Ulrichová Hakenová | VV | 4 930 | 13,54 | — | — |
| Petr Šimůnek | KSČM | 2 453 | 6,74 | — | — |
| John Bok | KDU-ČSL | 1 663 | 4,57 | — | — |
| Klára Rulíková | SOS | 8 72 | 2,39 | — | — |
| David Štěpán | SDŽ | 419 | 1,15 | — | — |
| Jaroslav Janeček | SZR | 403 | 1,10 | — | — |
| Eva Hurychová | ČSNS 2005 | 302 | 0,82 | — | — |
| František Nešetřil | US-DEU, KAN | 296 | 0,81 | — | — |
| Karel Berka | S.O.S. PRAGUE | 75 | 0,20 | — | — |

=== 2014 ===
2014 Czech Senate election in Prague 5
| Candidate | Party | 1st round | | 2nd round | |
| Candidate | Party | Votes | % | Votes | % |
|---|---|---|---|---|---|
| Václav Láska | SZ, KDU-ČSL | 10 848 | 30,01 | 12 752 | 65,08 |
| Pavel Žáček | ODS | 6 053 | 16,74 | 6 842 | 34,91 |
| Věra Adámková | ANO 2011 | 5 696 | 15,76 | — | — |
| Vladimír Balaš | TOP 09, STAN | 5 014 | 13,87 | — | — |
| Stanislav Štech | ČSSD | 4 170 | 11,53 | — | — |
| Roman Kříž | Svobodní | 1 667 | 4,61 | — | — |
| Lubomír Ledl | KSČM | 1 454 | 4,02 | — | — |
| Karol Hrádela | Dawn | 553 | 1,53 | — | — |
| Milan Jančík | KA14 | 333 | 0,92 | — | — |
| Daniel Solis | ND | 275 | 0,76 | — | — |
| Dimiter Petrov | Republic | 79 | 0,21 | — | — |

=== 2020 ===
2020 Czech Senate election in Prague 5
| Candidate | Party | 1st round | | 2nd round | |
| Candidate | Party | Votes | % | Votes | % |
|---|---|---|---|---|---|
| Václav Láska | SEN 21 | 15 047 | 37,44 | 14 333 | 54,37 |
| Michael Žantovský | TOP 09, ODS, STAN | 15 929 | 39,63 | 12 028 | 45,62 |
| Miloslav Ludvík | ČSSD, ANO 2011 | 5 425 | 13,49 | — | — |
| Mansoor Maitah | Tricolour | 1 408 | 3,50 | — | — |
| Milan Wünsche | SPD | 1 328 | 3,30 | — | — |
| Roman Blaško | KSČM | 686 | 1,70 | — | — |
| Jan Kubín | PATH | 365 | 0,90 | — | — |

=== 2026 ===
2026 Czech Senate election in Prague 5
| Candidate | Party | 1st round | | 2nd round | |
| Candidate | Party | Votes | % | Votes | % |
|---|---|---|---|---|---|
| Václav Láska | SEN 21 | 14 606 | 32,54 | 12 205 | 53,21 |
| Radko Sáblík | ODS, STAN, KDU-ČSL | 12 162 | 27,10 | 10 730 | 46,78 |
| Zdeněk Šarapatka | TOP 09, LES, Pirates | 5 425 | 13,49 | — | — |
| Lubomír Brož | ANO 2011 | 6 030 | 13,43 | — | — |
| Pavel Spirov | SPD | 2 084 | 4,64 | — | — |
| Petra Prokšanová | KSČM | 711 | 1,58 | — | — |
| Ľubomír Augustín | Přísaha | 418 | 0,93 | — | — |
