= Senate district 24 – Prague 9 =

Electoral district in the Czech Republic

Coordinates: 50°06′09″N 14°35′29″E

24 – Prague 9
- inline Senate district of the Czech Republic

- The Prague-9 district on a map
- Senator: David Smoljak; STAN
- Region: Prague
- District: Capital City of Prague
- Electorate: 103867
- Area: 85.07 km²
- Last election: 2026
- Next election: 2032

Senate district 24 – Prague 9 is an electoral district of the Senate of the Czech Republic, located in part of the Capital City of Prague. From 2019 onwards, David Smoljak, a STAN member, is the Senator for the district.

== Senators ==
Year	Senator	Party
1996	Josef Pavlata	ODS
2002	Josef Pavlata	ODS
2008	Tomáš Kladívko	ODS
2014	Zuzana Baudyšová	ANO 2011
2019	David Smoljak	STAN
2020	David Smoljak	STAN
2026	David Smoljak	STAN

== Election results ==
1996 Czech Senate election in Prague 5
Candidate	Party	1st round		2nd round	
Candidate	Party	Votes	%	Votes	%
Josef Pavlata	ODS	18 990	48,41	23 770	62,45
Zdeněk Trojan.	ČSSD	7 519	19,17	14 293	37,55
Jiřina Nováková	ODA	4 679	11,93	—	—
Josef Alois Tichý	KSČM	3 991	10,17	—	—
Ratibor Majzlík	DEU	1 184	3,02	—	—
Pavel Holba	KAN	7 53	1,92	—	—
Milada Veselá	SZ	670	1,71	—	—
John Bok	PB	546	1,39	—	—
Miloslav Šorejs	NEZ	427	1,09	—	—
František Kollman	RU	234	0,60	—	—
Vlastislav Vondrák	PP	233	0,59	—	—

=== 2002 ===
2002 Czech Senate election in Prague 5
Candidate	Party	1st round		2nd round	
Candidate	Party	Votes	%	Votes	%
Josef Pavlata	ODS	8 695	31,91	18 664	56,52
Josef Dobrý	ČSSD	4 535	16,64	14 356	43,47
František Vondráček	Independent	3 335	12,23	—	—
Evžen Smrkovský	KSČM	3 136	11,50	—	—
Sylva Rychtalíková	US-DEU	2 391	8,77	—	—
Martin Schulz	SNK, ED	2 264	8,30	—	—
Petr Fiala	Hope	1 510	5,54	—	—
Jiřina Nováková	ODA	1 381	5,06	—	—

=== 2008 ===
2008 Czech Senate election in Prague 5
Candidate	Party	1st round		2nd round	
Candidate	Party	Votes	%	Votes	%
Tomáš Kladívko	ODS	11 644	30,78	18 348	54,05
Jiří Koskuba	ČSSD	9 623	25,43	15 594	45,94
Zuzana Baudyšová	SNK ED	5 491	14,51	—	—
Evžen Smrkovský	KSČM	3 340	8,82	—	—
Vlastimil Ježek	KDU-ČSL	2 640	6,97	—	—
Ladislav Hrabal	SZ	2 016	5,32	—	—
Petr Cibulka	PB	1 832	4,84	—	—
Šárka Weberová	SOS	587	1,55	—	—
Vít Olmer	S.O.S. PRAGUE	380	1,00	—	—
Bohdan Babinec	ČSNS 2005, SZR	274	0,72	—	—

=== 2014 ===
2014 Czech Senate election in Prague 5
Candidate	Party	1st round		2nd round	
Candidate	Party	Votes	%	Votes	%
Zuzana Baudyšová	ANO 2011	13 232	37,02	11 260	62,53
Tomáš Kladívko	ODS	5 974	16,71	6 745	37,46
Jiří Vávra	TOP 09, STAN	5 598	15,66	—	—
Oldřich Pelčák	ČSSD	3 812	10,66	—	—
Ilona Picková	SZ	2 129	5,95	—	—
František Křížek	KSČM	1 868	5,22	—	—
František Pecka	Svobodní	1 427	3,99	—	—
Miroslav Froněk	KA14	722	2,02	—	—
Petr Hannig	Rozumní	474	1,32	—	—
Ivan Noveský	DOMOV	280	0,78	—	—
Ludvík Uwe Vaník	Republic	226	063	—	—

=== 2019 ===
Candidate	Party	1st round		2nd round	
Candidate	Party	Votes	%	Votes	%
David Smoljak	STAN	4 514	23,53	7 070	59,50
Jan Jarolím	ODS, KDU-ČSL	4 651	24,25	4 811	40,49
Petr Daubner	Pirates, ČSSD, Greens	2 674	13,94	—	—
Martin Hrubčík	ANO 2011	2 391	12,46	—	—
Martin Kroh	TOP 09	1 392	7,25	—	—
Libor Michálek	VIZE	1 127	5,87	—	—
Petr Šimůnek	KSČM	807	4,20	—	—
Jiří Koskuba	ČS	678	3,53	—	—
Pavel Pešan	SPD	563	2,93	—	—
Eva Syková	FOR Health	380	1,98	—	—

=== 2020 ===
2020 Czech Senate election in Prague 5
Candidate	Party	1st round		2nd round	
Candidate	Party	Votes	%	Votes	%
David Smoljak	STAN, Pirates, TOP 09	14 893	42,87	11 136	54,85
Eduard Stehlík	ODS, KDU-ČSL	10 489	30,19	9 164	45,14
Václav Krása	Tricolour	2 047	5,89	—	—
David Pavlát	ČSSD	1 684	4,84	—	—
Vítězslav Novák	SPD	1 526	4,39	—	—
Filip Smoljak	FOR Health	1 249	3,59	—	—
Zdeněk Hostomský	ANK 2020	1 091	3,14	—	—
Pavel Franěk	KSČM	843	2,42	—	—
Lucie Groene Odkolek	DSZ	508	1,46	—	—
Vladimíra Vítová	ANS	257	0,73	—	—
Ladislav Pavlíček	NáS	150	0,43	—	—

=== 2026 ===
2026 Czech Senate election in Prague 5
Candidate	Party	1st round		2nd round	
Candidate	Party	Votes	%	Votes	%
David Smoljak	STAN, Pirates, TOP 09, KDU-ČSL, Greens	20 232	48,92	14 739	78,73
Dagmar Pecková	ODS	9 539	23,06	3 981	21,26
Radek Žalud	ANO 2011	6 080	14,70	—	—
Bedřich Laube	Svobodní, SPD, Tricolour, PRO	3 346	8,09	—	—
Darina Batyiová	Kruh	2 156	5,21	—	—
