= Senate district 6 – Louny =

Electoral district in the Czech Republic

Coordinates: 50°12′13″N 13°39′00″E

6 – Louny
- inline Senate district of the Czech Republic

- The Louny district on a map
- Senator: Ivo Trešl; Mayors and Independents
- Region: Ústí nad Labem; Central Bohemian
- District: Louny; Rakovník; Kladno
- Electorate: 116980
- Area: 2,013.95 km²
- Last election: 2026
- Next election: 2032

Senate district 6 – Louny is an electoral district of the Senate of the Czech Republic, containing the districts of Louny and Rakovník as well as northern parts of the Kladno district. From 2020, Ivo Trešl of Mayors and Independents became the Senator for the district.

== Senators ==
Year	Senator	Party
1996	Ivan Havlíček	ČSSD
2002	Miloslav Pelc	ODS
2008	Marcel Chládek	ČSSD
2014	Zdeňka Hamousová	ANO
2020	Ivo Trešl	STAN
2026	Ivo Trešl	STAN

== Election results ==
=== 1996 ===
1996 Czech Senate election in Louny
Candidate	Party	1st round		2nd round	
Candidate	Party	Votes	%	Votes	%
Ivan Havlíček	ČSSD	8 466	23,71	19 348	55,86
Karel Suchopárek	ODS	13 406	37,54	15 291	44,14
Helena Růžičková	KSČM	8 112	22,72	—	—
Jan Bartoň	Independent	3 403	9,53	—	—
Ivan Dejmal	ODA	2 325	6,51	—	—
ČSSD win (new seat)					

=== 2002 ===
2002 Czech Senate election in Louny
Candidate	Party	1st round		2nd round	
Candidate	Party	Votes	%	Votes	%
Miloslav Pelc	ODS	5 964	24,93	18 407	54,71
Filip Celba	KSČM	5 795	24,22	15 234	45,28
Ivan Havlíček	ČSSD	3 373	14,10	—	—
Jan Bartoň	SNK ED	3 102	12,96	—	—
Bohuslav Kuneš	US-DEU	2 598	10,86	—	—
Ladislav Půlpán	AZSD (Note: Part of Váš hlas coalition)	1 806	7,55	—	—
František Povolný	SD-SN	767	2,94	—	—
ODS gain from ČSSD					

=== 2008 ===
2008 Czech Senate election in Louny
Candidate	Party	1st round		2nd round	
Candidate	Party	Votes	%	Votes	%
Marcel Chládek	ČSSD	12 747	32,46	21 529	66,56
Jan Kerner	ODS	9 051	23,05	10 812	33,43
Václav Beneš	KSČM	8 344	21,24	—	—
Miroslav Hylák	S.cz	2 502	6,37	—	—
Radovan Šabata	SNK ED	1 528	3,89	—	—
Eva Hůlová	ČSNS 2005 (Note: In a coalition with Rozumní)	1 289	3,28	—	—
Svatopluk Karásek	SZ	1 139	2,90	—	—
František Bušek	HNPD	1 066	2,71	—	—
Zdeněk Renc	US-DEU	817	2,08	—	—
Jaromír Vápeník	NEZ/DEM	583	1,48	—	—
Bohuslav Pichl	SDŽ	200	0,50	—	—
ČSSD gain from ODS					

=== 2014 ===
2014 Czech Senate election in Louny
Candidate	Party	1st round		2nd round	
Candidate	Party	Votes	%	Votes	%
Zdeňka Hamousová	ANO	10 685	25,79	10 837	52,31
Marcel Chládek	ČSSD	11 134	26,88	9 876	47,68
Eva Kašová	KSČM	6 116	14,76	—	—
Luděk Štíbr	ODS	4 135	9,98	—	—
Ivo Trešl	MPV	3 945	9,52	—	—
Leo Steiner	KDU-ČSL (Note: In a coalition with SZ, HNHRM and B10.cz)	2 278	5,50	—	—
Jiří Loskot	Independent	1 819	4,39	—	—
Vladimír Záhorský	NEZ	1 306	3,15	—	—
ANO gain from ČSSD					

=== 2020 ===
2020 Czech Senate election in Louny
Candidate	Party	1st round		2nd round	
Candidate	Party	Votes	%	Votes	%
Ivo Trešl	STAN	7 995	20,92	10 179	58,39
Vladimír Drápal	ODS (Note: In a coalition with TOP 09, KDU-ČSL and KAN)	7 884	20,63	7 252	41,60
Milan Rychtařík	ANO	7 341	19,20	—	—
Zdeňka Hamousová	USZ	3 910	10,23	—	—
Daniel Pitek	SEN 21	3 352	8,77	—	—
Václav Beneš	KSČM	2 462	6,44	—	—
Dominik Hanko	SPD	2 201	5,75	—	—
Zdeněk Pištora	Tricolour	1 590	4,16	—	—
Jaroslav Veselý	UFO (Note: In a coalition with ProMOST)	1 153	3,01	—	—
Rostislav Domorák	S.cz	327	0,85	—	—
STAN gain from ANO					

=== 2026 ===
2026 Czech Senate election in Louny
Candidate	Party	1st round		2nd round	
Candidate	Party	Votes	%	Votes	%
Ivo Trešl	STAN (Note: Supported by ODS)	19 872	43,50	15 033	66,21
Jaroslav Mikoláš	ANO 2011	11 675	25,55	7 670	33,78
Vladislav Hrbáček	SPD (Note: Supported by PRO)	4 992	10,92	—	—
Leo Steiner	JsmePro!	4 617	10,10	—	—
Ivana Hluštíková	Greens (Note: In a coalition with Pirates, supported by Kruh)	2 955	6,46	—	—
Jiří Kobza	Stačilo!	1 568	3,43	—	—
STAN hold					
