= Senate district 72 – Ostrava-City =

Electoral district in the Czech Republic

72 – Ostrava-City
- inline Senate district of the Czech Republic

- The district 72 on a map
- Senator: Ondřej Šimetka; ODS
- Region: Moravian-Silesian
- District: Ostrava-City; Opava
- Last election: 2026
- Next election: 2032

Senate district 72 – Ostrava-City is an electoral district of the Senate of the Czech Republic, located in the western part of the Ostrava-City District and the eastern part of the Opava District. Since 2020, the Senator for the district has been Ondřej Šimetka, an independent nominated by the ODS.

== Senators ==
| Year | Senator | Party |
|---|---|---|
| 1996 | Vítězslav Matuška | ČSSD |
| 2002 | Václav Roubíček | ODS |
| 2008 | Petr Guziana | ČSSD |
| 2014 | Peter Koliba | ANO 2011 |
| 2020 | Ondřej Šimetka | ODS |
| 2026 | Ondřej Šimetka | ODS |

== Election results ==
=== 1996 ===
1996 Czech Senate election in Ostrava-City
| Candidate | Party | 1st round | | 2nd round | |
| Candidate | Party | Votes | % | Votes | % |
|---|---|---|---|---|---|
| Vítězslav Matuška | ČSSD | 7 160 | 23,28 | 16 501 | 52,75 |
| Miloslav Bartoš | ODS | 10 704 | 34,81 | 14 779 | 47,25 |
| Petr Gajdáček | KSČM | 4 608 | 14,98 | — | — |
| Zbyněk Pražák | KDU-ČSL | 3 801 | 12,36 | — | — |
| Jiří Pekárek | ODA | 2 150 | 6,99 | — | — |
| Rajko Doleček | MSLK 96 | 1 307 | 4,25 | — | — |
| Marcela Jelínková | SZ | 550 | 1,79 | — | — |
| Marie Návratová | ČSNS | 471 | 1,53 | — | — |

=== 2002 ===
2002 Czech Senate election in Ostrava-City
| Candidate | Party | 1st round | | 2nd round | |
| Candidate | Party | Votes | % | Votes | % |
|---|---|---|---|---|---|
| Václav Roubíček | ODS | 8 276 | 42,32 | 13 646 | 51,45 |
| Hana Zelenková | ČSSD | 4 834 | 24,72 | 12 873 | 48,54 |
| Jaromír Horák | KSČM | 4 336 | 22,17 | — | — |
| Pavel Dobeš | BPS | 1 217 | 6,22 | — | — |
| Nataša Hradecká | CZ | 538 | 2,75 | — | — |
| Viktor Hubert | SŽJ | 352 | 1,80 | — | — |

=== 2008 ===
2008 Czech Senate election in Ostrava-City
| Candidate | Party | 1st round | | 2nd round | |
| Candidate | Party | Votes | % | Votes | % |
|---|---|---|---|---|---|
| Petr Guziana | ČSSD | 14 471 | 39,27 | 17 563 | 64,97 |
| Václav Roubíček | ODS | 10 503 | 28,50 | 9 468 | 35,02 |
| Věra Flasarová | KSČM | 5 730 | 15,55 | — | — |
| Norbert Havlík | KDU-ČSL | 2 429 | 6,59 | — | — |
| Alois Dlouhý | NEZ | 2 188 | 5,93 | — | — |
| Blanka Štěpánová | NEZ/DEM | 1 524 | 4,13 | — | — |

=== 2014 ===
2014 Czech Senate election in Ostrava-City
| Candidate | Party | 1st round | | 2nd round | |
| Candidate | Party | Votes | % | Votes | % |
|---|---|---|---|---|---|
| Peter Koliba | ANO 2011 | 5 770 | 20,04 | 5 913 | 52,93 |
| Petr Mihálik | ČSSD | 5 704 | 19,81 | 5 257 | 47,06 |
| Radim Žebrák | Ostravak | 4 605 | 15,99 | — | — |
| Lukáš Curylo | KDU-ČSL | 3 117 | 10,82 | — | — |
| Petr Gajdáček | KSČM | 2 906 | 10,09 | — | — |
| Pavel Bartoš | ODS | 2 351 | 8,16 | — | — |
| Petr Chodura | TOR | 1 917 | 6,65 | — | — |
| Jiří Joneš | TOP 09, STAN | 859 | 2,98 | — | — |
| Věra Racková | OF | 779 | 2,70 | — | — |
| Petr Guziana | SPO | 530 | 1,84 | — | — |
| Radoslav Štědroň | SP | 249 | 0,86 | — | — |

=== 2020 ===
2020 Czech Senate election in Ostrava-město
| Candidate | Party | 1st round | | 2nd round | |
| Candidate | Party | Votes | % | Votes | % |
|---|---|---|---|---|---|
| Ondřej Šimetka | ODS | 6 688 | 21,68 | 7 546 | 67,89 |
| Zdeněk Jiříček | ANO 2011 | 6 747 | 21,87 | 3 568 | 32,10 |
| Martin Tomášek | Pirates | 3 916 | 12,69 | — | — |
| Liana Janáčková | NEZ | 3 782 | 12,26 | — | — |
| Radim Smetana | ČSSD | 2 548 | 8,26 | — | — |
| Jan Síla | SPD | 1 830 | 5,93 | — | — |
| Andrea Wlochová | Tricolour | 1 307 | 4,23 | — | — |
| Petr Gajdáček | KSČM | 1 264 | 4,09 | — | — |
| Rostislav Gromnica | STAN | 946 | 3,06 | — | — |
| Peter Koliba | ANK 2020 | 825 | 2,67 | — | — |
| Pynelopi Cimprichová | UNIFIED | 564 | 1,82 | — | — |
| Miroslava Škaldová | VOK | 259 | 0,83 | — | — |
| Jiří Sapeta | NáS | 164 | 0,53 | — | — |

=== 2026 ===
2026 Czech Senate election in Ostrava-město
| Candidate | Party | 1st round | | 2nd round | |
| Candidate | Party | Votes | % | Votes | % |
|---|---|---|---|---|---|
| Ondřej Šimetka | ODS, Pirates, STAN, TOP 09, KDU-ČSL | 15 542 | 46,74 | 12 524 | 65,90 |
| Lucie Baránková Vilamová | ANO 2011 | 10 177 | 30,61 | 6 479 | 34,09 |
| Milan Loprais | PRO, SPD | 4 239 | 12,75 | — | — |
| Petr Jančík | Ostravak | 2 071 | 6,22 | — | — |
| Štefan Režný | ReMeK | 624 | 1,87 | — | — |
| Radoslav Štědroň | Swiss Democracy | 388 | 1,16 | — | — |
| Radek Iwoniak | ČSSD | 206 | 0,61 | — | — |
