= Senate district 3 – Cheb =

Electoral district of the Czech Republic

Coordinates: 49°56′46″N 12°36′12″E

3 – Cheb
- inline Senate district of the Czech Republic

- The Cheb district on a map
- Senator: Miroslav Plevný; STAN
- Region: Karlovy Vary
- District: Tachov; Cheb
- Electorate: 97156
- Area: 2,177.84 km²
- Last election: 2026
- Next election: 2032

Senate district 3 – Cheb is an electoral district of the Senate of the Czech Republic, consisting of the north part of Cheb District and whole of Tachov District. Since 2020, Miroslav Plevný of Mayors and Independents is representing the district.

== Senators ==
Senators for the district 3 – Cheb
Year	Senator	Party
1996	Peter Morávek	ČSSD
2002	Ladislav Macák	ČSSD
2008	Miroslav Nenutil	ČSSD
2014	Miroslav Nenutil	ČSSD
2020	Miroslav Plevný	STAN
2026	Miroslav Plevný	STAN

== Election results ==
=== 1996 ===
1996 Czech Senate election in Cheb
Candidate	Party	1st round		2nd round	
Candidate	Party	Votes	%	Votes	%
Peter Morávek	ČSSD	6 188	26,97	14 006	57,81
Jiří Gruša	ODS	8 874	38,68	10 221	42,19
František Podlipský	KSČM	4 922	21,46	—	—
Břetislav Malásek	KDU-ČSL	1 379	6,01	—	—
Jaroslav Kraus	Independent	867	3,78	—	—
Oldřich Petrlík	SZ	441	1,92	—	—
Ladislav Ochozka	KAN	270	1,18	—	—
ČSSD win (new seat)					

=== 2002 ===
2002 Czech Senate election in Cheb
Candidate	Party	1st round		2nd round	
Candidate	Party	Votes	%	Votes	%
Ladislav Macák	ČSSD	4 273	25,57	15 372	64,74
Václav Černý	KSČM	4 480	26,81	8 369	35,25
Jan Volavka	ODS	3 328	19,91	—	—
Vojtěch Šrámek	US-DEU	1 976	11,82	—	—
Hana Heyduková	Independent	1 671	10,00	—	—
Karel Nykles	SZ	741	4,43	—	—
Petr Borka	BPS	238	1,42	—	—
ČSSD hold					

=== 2008 ===
2008 Czech Senate election in Cheb
Candidate	Party	1st round		2nd round	
Candidate	Party	Votes	%	Votes	%
Miroslav Nenutil	ČSSD	7 895	29,47	7 368	50,95
Ivo Mlátilík	Independent	6 628	24,74	7 093	49,04
František Podlipský	KSČM	4 856	18,13	—	—
Jan Svoboda	ODS	3 730	13,92	—	—
Jaromír Dušek	SDŽ	1 590	5,93	—	—
Petr Němec	SZ	947	3,63	—	—
Oldřich Dvorský	NEZ/DEM	724	2,70	—	—
ČSSD hold					

=== 2014 ===
2014 Czech Senate election in Cheb
Candidate	Party	1st round		2nd round	
Candidate	Party	Votes	%	Votes	%
Miroslav Nenutil	ČSSD	6 364	29,21	5 373	56,68
Jiří Dufka	ANO 2011	4 688	21,52	4 106	43,31
Pavel Hojda	KSČM	3 615	16,59	—	—
Jaroslav Kočvara	ODS	2 109	9,68	—	—
Vítězslav Padevět	TOP 09 (Note: In a coalition with STAN)	2 043	9,37	—	—
Libor Špaček	Pirates	1 061	4,87	—	—
Václav Jakl	Svobodní	1 058	4,85	—	—
Jaroslav Bradáč	SPO	843	3,87	—	—
ČSSD hold					

=== 2020 ===
2020 Czech Senate election in Cheb
Candidate	Party	1st round		2nd round	
Candidate	Party	Votes	%	Votes	%
Miroslav Plevný	STAN	7 497	28,74	6 902	59,47
Jaroslava Brožová Lampertová	ANO 2011	6 708	25,72	4 703	40,52
Miroslav Nenutil	ČSSD	4 588	17,59	—	—
Markéta Monsportová	Pirates	2 332	8,94	—	—
Josef Švarcbek	KSČM	1 553	5,95	—	—
Josef Kvasnička	SPD	1 172	4,49	—	—
Jiří Sedláček	Tricolor	1 001	3,83	—	—
Svatava Štěrbová	Greens (Note: In a coalitin with SEN 21)	848	3,13	—	—
Martin Lojda	FOR Health	410	1,57	—	—
STAN gain from ČSSD					

=== 2026 ===
2026 Czech Senate election in Cheb
Candidate	Party	1st round		2nd round	
Candidate	Party	Votes	%	Votes	%
Miroslav Plevný	STAN (Note: Supported by TOP 09, Greens, Pirates, KDU-ČSL and ODS)	13 659	40,08	13 846	71,35
Sandra Tsoukernik	ANO 2011	9 227	27,08	5 558	28,64
Štepánka Černá	VOK	4 194	12,30	—	—
Vladimír Keblúšek	Our Czechia	3 617	10,61	—	—
Ivan Reis	SPD (Note: Supported by PRO)	2 186	6,41	—	—
Pavel Hojda	KSČM	1 190	3,49	—	—
STAN hold					
