= Senate district 45 – Hradec Králové =

Electoral district in the Czech Republic

45 – Hradec Králové
- inline Senate district of the Czech Republic

- The Hradec Králové district on a map
- Senator: Zuzana Ceralová Petrofová; ODS
- Region: Hradec Králové
- District: Hradec Králové
- Last election: 2026
- Next election: 2032

Senate district 45 – Hradec Králové is an electoral district of the Senate of the Czech Republic, located in part of the Hradec Králové District. Since 2020, the Senator for the district is Zuzana Ceralová Petrofová, ODS nominee.

== Senators ==
| Year | Senator | Party |
|---|---|---|
| 1996 | Karel Barták | ODA |
| 2002 | Karel Barták | Independent |
| 2008 | Vladimír Dryml | ČSSD |
| 2014 | Jaroslav Malý | ČSSD |
| 2020 | Jan Holásek | HDK |
| 2026 | Zuzana Ceralová Petrofová | ODS |

== Election results ==
=== 1996 ===
1996 Czech Senate election in Hradec Králové
| Candidate | Party | 1st round | | 2nd round | |
| Candidate | Party | Votes | % | Votes | % |
|---|---|---|---|---|---|
| Karel Barták | ODA | 9 028 | 21,31 | 17 178 | 50,48 |
| Jiří Vlček | ODS | 16 464 | 38,85 | 16 850 | 49,52 |
| František Čáslavský | ČSSD | 7 452 | 17,59 | — | — |
| Jiří Frajdl | KSČM | 6 163 | 14,54 | — | — |
| Augustin Čermák | Independent | 2 453 | 5,79 | — | — |
| Josef Fiedler | NEZ | 815 | 1,92 | — | — |

=== 2002 ===
2002 Czech Senate election in Hradec Králové
| Candidate | Party | 1st round | | 2nd round | |
| Candidate | Party | Votes | % | Votes | % |
|---|---|---|---|---|---|
| Karel Barták | Independent | 8 269 | 27,77 | 20 614 | 62,08 |
| Martin Dvořák | VPM | 6 489 | 21,79 | 12 587 | 37,91 |
| Marta Pohnerová | ODS | 6 039 | 20,28 | — | — |
| Milan Špás | KSČM | 4 944 | 16,60 | — | — |
| Jaroslav Bartoš | ČSSD | 2 948 | 9,90 | — | — |
| Stanislav Pecka | SV | 1 083 | 3,63 | — | — |

=== 2008 ===
2008 Czech Senate election in Hradec Králové
| Candidate | Party | 1st round | | 2nd round | |
| Candidate | Party | Votes | % | Votes | % |
|---|---|---|---|---|---|
| Vladimír Dryml | ČSSD | 18 347 | 38,44 | 22 326 | 53,66 |
| Leoš Heger | ODS | 15 518 | 32,51 | 19 277 | 46,33 |
| Lenka Trkalová | KSČM | 4 725 | 9,90 | — | — |
| Vladimír Derner | KDU-ČSL | 3 277 | 6,86 | — | — |
| Karel Barták | SNK ED | 3 255 | 6,82 | — | — |
| Pavel Dobeš | SZ | 2 601 | 5,45 | — | — |

=== 2014 ===
2014 Czech Senate election in Hradec Králové
| Candidate | Party | 1st round | | 2nd round | |
| Candidate | Party | Votes | % | Votes | % |
|---|---|---|---|---|---|
| Jaroslav Malý | ČSSD | 8 733 | 21,95 | 12 989 | 60,12 |
| Oldřich Vlasák | ODS | 7 524 | 18,91 | 8 613 | 39,87 |
| Přemysl Škácha | ANO 2011 | 6 027 | 15,15 | — | — |
| Anna Maclová | KDU-ČSL | 4 400 | 11,06 | — | — |
| Lubomír Štěpán | KSČM | 3 892 | 9,78 | — | — |
| Jiří Oliva | TOP 09, STAN | 3 150 | 7,92 | — | — |
| Pavel Křížek | SZ | 2 342 | 5,88 | — | — |
| Jiří Hejhálek | Svobodní | 1 422 | 3,57 | — | — |
| Ladislav Minařík | Dawn | 1 077 | 2,70 | — | — |
| Vladimír Dryml | DOMOV | 745 | 1,87 | — | — |
| Jiří Hladík | DOMA | 459 | 1,15 | — | — |

=== 2020 ===
2020 Czech Senate election in Hradec Králové
| Candidate | Party | 1st round | | 2nd round | |
| Candidate | Party | Votes | % | Votes | % |
|---|---|---|---|---|---|
| Jan Holásek | HDK, TOP 09, SEN 21, Greens, LES | 7 445 | 16,91 | 15 138 | 70,23 |
| Jiří Mašek | ANO 2011 | 8 587 | 19,51 | 6 414 | 29,76 |
| Pavel Vacek | Pirates | 6 033 | 13,70 | — | — |
| Pavel Staněk | ODS | 5 993 | 13,61 | — | — |
| Jaroslav Malý | Independent | 4 342 | 9,86 | — | — |
| Jan Čáp | KDU-ČSL | 4 075 | 9,26 | — | — |
| Markéta Pakandlová | SPD | 2 194 | 4,49 | — | — |
| Lubomír Štěpán | KSČM | 1 996 | 4,53 | — | — |
| Petr Brábník | Tricolour | 1 463 | 3,32 | — | — |
| Igor Indrák | Independent | 1 360 | 3,09 | — | — |
| Vladimír Dryml | FOR Health | 517 | 1,17 | — | — |

=== 2026 ===
2026 Czech Senate election in Hradec Králové
| Candidate | Party | 1st round | | 2nd round | |
| Candidate | Party | Votes | % | Votes | % |
|---|---|---|---|---|---|
| Zuzana Ceralová Petrofová | ODS | 10 039 | 21,94 | 15 022 | 60,15 |
| Martin Dvořák | STAN, TOP 09, HDK, Greens, Pirates | 11 498 | 25,13 | 9 951 | 39,84 |
| Jana Hůlková | ANO 2011 | 8 421 | 18,40 | — | — |
| Monika Nebeská | Independent | 6 860 | 14,99 | — | — |
| Jan Holásek | RH, VPM, HP, Us, Our Czechia | 5 573 | 12,18 | — | — |
| Ivan Picek | SPD | 2 439 | 5,33 | — | — |
| Vladimír Dryml | ČSSD | 922 | 2,01 | — | — |
