= Senate district 48 – Rychnov nad Kněžnou =

Electoral district in the Czech Republic

48 – Rychnov nad Kněžnou
- inline Senate district of the Czech Republic

- The Rychnov nad Kněžnou district on a map
- Senator: Jan Grulich; TOP 09
- Region: Hradec Králové; Pardubice
- District: Rychnov nad Kněžnou; Pardubice; Ústí nad Orlicí; Hradec Králové
- Last election: 2026
- Next election: 2032

Senate district 48 – Rychnov nad Kněžnou is an electoral district of the Senate of the Czech Republic, located in the entirety of the Rychnov nad Kněžnou District and parts of the Pardubice, Ústí nad Orlicí and Hradec Králové districts. Since 2020, the Senator for the district is Jan Grulich, a TOP 09 member.

== Senators ==
Year	Senator	Nominating party
1996	František Bartoš	KDU-ČSL
2002	Václava Domšová	SNK
2008	Miroslav Antl	ČSSD
2014	Miroslav Antl	ČSSD
2020	Jan Grulich	TOP 09
2026	Jan Grulich	TOP 09

== Election results ==
=== 1996 ===
1996 Czech Senate election in Rychnov nad Kněžnou
Candidate	Party	1st round		2nd round	
Candidate	Party	Votes	%	Votes	%
František Bartoš	KDU-ČSL	7 120	20,42	14 148	53,34
Josef Ježek	ODS	12 719	36,47	12 376	46,66
Jiří Kantůrek	ČSSD	6 810	19,53	—	—
Jan Vaník	KSČM	5 666	16,25	—	—
Miloslav Kejval	SZ	2 000	5,73	—	—
Helena Klinovská	KAN	560	1,61	—	—

=== 2002 ===
2002 Czech Senate election in Rychnov nad Kněžnou
Candidate	Party	1st round		2nd round	
Candidate	Party	Votes	%	Votes	%
Václava Domšová	SNK	4 756	20,32	20 929	63,98
František Bartoš	KDU-ČSL	6 110	26,10	11 781	36,01
Miroslava Němcová	ODS	4 189	17,89	—	—
Jan Langr	KSČM	3 848	16,44	—	—
Ivan Přikryl	ČSSD	2 394	10,22	—	—
Konstantin Korovin	Independent	1 353	5,78	—	—
Petr Vančura	VPM	753	3,21	—	—

=== 2008 ===
2008 Czech Senate election in Rychnov nad Kněžnou
Candidate	Party	1st round		2nd round	
Candidate	Party	Votes	%	Votes	%
Miroslav Antl	ČSSD	17 145	43,83	17 642	59,60
Václava Domšová	SNK ED	7 417	18,96	11 956	40,39
Vladimír Benák	ODS	5 824	14,89	—	—
Drahomíra Peřinová	KDU-ČSL	4 201	10,74	—	—
Bedřich Chasák	KSČM	3 578	9,14	—	—
Jiří Syrový	SDŽ	947	2,42	—	—

=== 2014 ===
2014 Czech Senate election in Rychnov nad Kněžnou
Candidate	Party	1st round		2nd round	
Candidate	Party	Votes	%	Votes	%
Miroslav Antl	ČSSD	16 799	41,12	10 823	59,76
Luboš Řehák	KDU-ČSL	6 504	15,92	7 286	40,23
Petr Sadovský	ANO 2011	5 606	13,72	—	—
Josef Lukášek	KSČM	4 393	10,75	—	—
Václav Cempírek	TOP 09, STAN	3 367	8,24	—	—
Soňa Hlavová	SPO	2 829	6,92	—	—
Roman Kučera	Pirates	1 350	3,30	—	—

=== 2020 ===
2020 Czech Senate election in Rychnov nad Kněžnou
Candidate	Party	1st round		2nd round	
Candidate	Party	Votes	%	Votes	%
Jan Grulich	TOP 09, LES	9 472	24,37	11 432	59,65
Miroslav Antl	FOR CITZENS	10 275	26,44	7 733	40,34
Jana Drejslová	ODS	7 369	18,96	—	—
Drahoslav Chudoba	Independent	2 686	6,91	—	—
František Mencl	ČSSD	2 500	6,43	—	—
Josef Lukášek	KSČM	2 491	6,41	—	—
Vladimíra Lesenská	SPD	2 436	6,26	—	—
Jiří Matoušek	Tricolour	1 629	4,19	—	—

=== 2026 ===
2026 Czech Senate election in Rychnov nad Kněžnou
Candidate	Party	1st round	
Candidate	Party	Votes	%
Jan Grulich	TOP 09, ODS, KDU-ČSL, STAN, Pirates, LES	28 492	62,19
Petr Sadovský	ANO 2011	17 321	37,80
