= Senate district 33 – Děčín =

Electoral district in the Czech Republic

33 – Děčín
- inline Senate district of the Czech Republic

- The Děčín district on a map
- Senator: Zbyňek Linhart; Mayors and Independents
- Region: Ústí nad Labem
- District: Děčín
- Electorate: 103 214
- Area: 908.58 km²
- Last election: 2026
- Next election: 2032

Senate district 33 – Děčín is an electoral district of the Senate of the Czech Republic, located in the entirety of the Děčín District. From 2014 onwards, Zbyňek Linhart, an Mayors and Independents nominee, is the Senator for the district.

== Senators ==
Year	Senator	Party
1996	Egon Lánský	ČSSD
2002	Josef Zoser	HNHRM
2008	Jaroslav Sykáček	ČSSD
2014	Zbyněk Linhart	STAN
2020	Zbyněk Linhart	STAN
2026	Zbyněk Linhart	STAN

== Election results ==
=== 1996 ===
1996 Czech Senate election in Děčín
Candidate	Party	1st round		2nd round	
Candidate	Party	Votes	%	Votes	%
Egon Lánský	ČSSD	8 779	30,34	17 024	56,96
Tomáš Ježek	ODS	10 748	37,14	12 865	43,04
Josef Hošek	KSČM	4 564	15,77	—	—
Mahulena Čejková	ČSNS	2 367	8,18	—	—
Stanislava Holíková	ODA	2 072	7,16	—	—
Josef Marek	DEU	406	1,40	—	—

=== 2002 ===
2002 Czech Senate election in Děčín
Candidate	Party	1st round		2nd round	
Candidate	Party	Votes	%	Votes	%
Josef Zoser	HNHRM	4 576	20,53	16 915	59,15
Anna Briestenská	ČSSD	5 759	25,84	11 679	40,84
Ladislav Gre	ODS	4 363	19,57	—	—
Vladimír Reiber	KSČM	4 032	18,09	—	—
Jiří Benedikt	KDU-ČSL	3 068	13,76	—	—
Petr Hannig	SZR	489	2,19	—	—

=== 2008 ===
2008 Czech Senate election in Děčín
Candidate	Party	1st round		2nd round	
Candidate	Party	Votes	%	Votes	%
Jaroslav Sykáček	ČSSD	8 746	24,72	17 016	61,65
Vladislav Raška	ODS	7 805	22,06	10 581	38,34
Josef Zoser	HNHRM	7 542	21,32	—	—
Václav Šenkýř	KSČM	5 330	15,07	—	—
Monika Lampová	SZ	2 106	5,95	—	—
Mirko Bernas	S.cz	2 055	5,81	—	—
Miroslava Švubová	SOS	737	2,08	—	—
Miroslav Červenka	PaS	736	2,08	—	—
Ilona Tůmová	SDŽ	309	0,87	—	—

=== 2014 ===
2014 Czech Senate election in Děčín
Candidate	Party	1st round		2nd round	
Candidate	Party	Votes	%	Votes	%
Zbyněk Linhart	STAN	11 353	33,34	11 099	71,43
Jaroslav Sykáček	ČSSD	5 698	16,73	4 438	28,56
Marcela Dvořáčková	ANO 2011	5 091	14,95	—	—
Josef Zoser	HNHRM, KDU-ČSL, SZ, ProKraj	3 501	10,28	—	—
Václav Šenkýř	KSČM	2 351	6,90	—	—
Josef Holub	ODS	2 263	6,64	—	—
Martin Zíka	Pirates	1 453	4,26	—	—
Vladimír Gregor	Svobodní	1 243	3,65	—	—
Petr Šmíd	SPO	760	2,23	—	—
Jaroslav Kuba	ND	333	0,97	—	—

=== 2020 ===
2020 Czech Senate election in Děčín
Candidate	Party	1st round	
Candidate	Party	Votes	%
Zbyněk Linhart	STAN, SLK	15 787	52,77
Jiří Anděl	ANO 2011	5 728	19,14
Leoš Moravec	SPD	3 365	11,24
Zdeněk Říha	Tricolour	2 259	7,55
Šárka Štruplová Růžičková	S.cz	1 318	4,40
Václav Šenkýř	KSČM	1 171	3,91
Vladimír Navara	VOK	288	0,96

=== 2026 ===
2026 Czech Senate election in Děčín
Candidate	Party	1st round	
Candidate	Party	Votes	%
Zbyněk Linhart	STAN, SLK	17 850	52,22
Michal Hejcman	ANO 2011	6 882	20,13
Anna Lehká	MÍSTNÍ HNHRM	3 574	10,45
Jan Skalický	PRO	3 539	10,35
Miroslav Štross	Greens, Pirates, SEN 21	2 337	6,83
