= Senate district 81 – Uherské Hradiště =

Electoral district in the Czech Republic

81 – Uherské Hradiště
- inline Senate district of the Czech Republic

- The Uherské Hradiště district on a map
- Senator: Josef Bazala; KDU-ČSL
- Region: Zlín; South Moravian
- District: Uherské Hradiště; Hodonín
- Last election: 2026
- Next election: 2032

Senate district 81 – Uherské Hradiště is an electoral district of the Senate of the Czech Republic, located in the southern part of the Uherské Hradiště District and the eastern part of the Hodonín District. Since 2020, the Senator for the district has been Josef Bazala of KDU-ČSL.

== Senators ==
Year	Senator	Party
1996	Jaroslav Petřík	KDU-ČSL
2002	Josef Vaculík	KDU-ČSL
2008	Hana Doupovcová	ČSSD
2014	Ivo Valenta	Freeholders
2020	Josef Bazala	KDU-ČSL
2026	Josef Bazala	KDU-ČSL

== Election results ==
=== 1996 ===
1996 Czech Senate election in Uherské Hradiště
Candidate	Party	1st round		2nd round	
Candidate	Party	Votes	%	Votes	%
Jaroslav Petřík	KDU-ČSL	9 000	26,45	16 190	65,96
Jaroslav Zapletal	ODS	7 117	20,92	8 356	34,04
Josef Vacula	ČSSD	5 032	14,79	—	—
Jiří Deml	Independent	3 630	10,67	—	—
Karel Sýs	KSČM	3 171	9,32	—	—
Jaroslav Miklenda	Independent	2 127	6,25	—	—
Jan Jegla	MSLK 96	1 601	4,71	—	—
Miroslav Valenta	Independent	1 058	3,11	—	—
Vojtěch Ondra	Independent	773	2,27	—	—
Jaroslav Mlčák	DEU	514	1,51	—	—

=== 2002 ===
2002 Czech Senate election in Uherské Hradiště
Candidate	Party	1st round		2nd round	
Candidate	Party	Votes	%	Votes	%
Josef Vaculík	KDU-ČSL	7 686	34,26	18 834	65,67
Květoslav Tichavský	ODS	3 741	16,67	9 843	34,32
Josef Páč	KSČM	3 178	14,16	—	—
Jiří Deml	SNK ED	2 854	12,72	—	—
Stanislav Mišák	ČSSD	2 559	11,40	—	—
Ladislav Šupka	ODA	1 232	5,49	—	—
Pavel Dohnal	Moravané	1 181	5,26	—	—

=== 2008 ===
2008 Czech Senate election in Uherské Hradiště
Candidate	Party	1st round		2nd round	
Candidate	Party	Votes	%	Votes	%
Hana Doupovcová	ČSSD	11 704	30,82	15 121	50,99
Josef Vaculík	KDU-ČSL	10 423	27,45	14 531	49,00
Libor Karásek	ODS	7 621	20,07	—	—
Jindřich Kovář	KSČM	3 713	9,77	—	—
Josef Bartoněk	STAN	3 111	8,19	—	—
Stanislav Horňák	DS	1 095	2,88	—	—
Marta Chovancová	Rozumní	299	0,78	—	—

=== 2014 ===
2014 Czech Senate election in Uherské Hradiště
Candidate	Party	1st round		2nd round	
Candidate	Party	Votes	%	Votes	%
Ivo Valenta	Freeholders	14 071	31,10	11 660	54,17
Pavel Botek	KDU-ČSL	6 014	13,29	9 864	45,82
Zdeněk Botek	ANO 2011	5 384	11,90	—	—
Luděk Galuška	Independent	5 351	11,82	—	—
Jan Pijáček	ODS	5 121	11,31	—	—
Hana Doupovcová	ČSSD	4 279	9,45	—	—
Ivan Mařák	KSČM	3 162	6,98	—	—
Alessandro Alagia	SKP – ŘN	819	1,81	—	—
Václav Hučík	Independent	530	1,17	—	—
Stanislav Mikula	MDS, ZH	508	1,12	—	—

=== 2020 ===
2020 Czech Senate election in Uherské Hradiště
Candidate	Party	1st round		2nd round	
Candidate	Party	Votes	%	Votes	%
Josef Bazala	KDU-ČSL	11 107	30,94	13 172	60,78
Ivo Valenta	Freeholders	11 213	31,23	8 499	39,21
Petr Sládek	ODS	8 334	23,21	—	—
Antonín Seďa	ČSSD	3 393	9,45	—	—
Jarmila Blažková	SPD	1 850	5,15	—	—

=== 2026 ===
2026 Czech Senate election in Uherské Hradiště
Candidate	Party	1st round		2nd round	
Candidate	Party	Votes	%	Votes	%
Josef Bazala	KDU-ČSL	20 975	47,81	14 669	65,46
Jiří Vašica	ANO 2011	12 434	28,34	7 740	34,53
Kristýna Zelienková	Zvuk 12	4 124	9,40	—	—
Otakar Březina	SD-SN	3 126	7,12	—	—
David Skyba	SPD	1 793	4,08	—	—
Margita Balaštíková	HOČ	1 414	3,22	—	—
