= List of political parties in the Czech Republic =

This is a list of political parties in the Czech Republic. The Czech Republic has a multi-party system. Due to the electoral system used, a limited number of parties are successful in each parliamentary election.

== Parliamentary parties ==
There are currently eleven parties in the Chamber of Deputies (the lower house) with more than one seat – ANO 2011, the Civic Democratic Party (ODS), Mayors and Independents (STAN), the Christian and Democratic Union – Czechoslovak People's Party (KDU-ČSL), Freedom and Direct Democracy (SPD), Motorists for Themselves (AUTO), TOP 09, the Czech Pirate Party (Pirates), Mayors for the Liberec Region (SLK), Svobodní, and the Green Party (Zelení). All of these parties except SPD and AUTO also have at least one seat in the Senate (the upper house). Senator 21 (SEN 21) have four seats in the Senate but no seats in the Chamber of Deputies. Tricolour and Law, Respect, Expertise each hold a single seat in the Chamber of Deputies but no seats in the Senate. The Communist Party of Bohemia and Moravia (KSČM) hold no seats in the Chamber of Deputies or the Senate but do have one elected member of the European Parliament and have elected representatives at the regional level.

The only party to have had members elected to every Parliament since the dissolution of Czechoslovakia is ODS.

The most recent parliamentary election was held on 3–4 October 2025.

Party		Leader	Political position	Ideology	Representation				EU party
Party		Leader	Political position	Ideology	Chamber	Senate	Regions	EP	EU party
ANO 2011	ANO	Andrej Babiš	Right-wing	Right-wing populism	76 / 200	12 / 81	178 / 675	7 / 21	P.eu
Civic Democratic Party; Občanská demokratická strana	ODS	Martin Kupka	Centre-right	Conservatism; Euroscepticism	27 / 200	18 / 81	99 / 675	3 / 21	ECR
Mayors and Independents; Starostové a nezávislí	STAN	Vít Rakušan	Centre to centre-right	Liberalism; Localism	20 / 200	19 / 81	91 / 675	2 / 21	EPP
Christian and Democratic Union – Czechoslovak People's Party; Křesťanská a demokratická unie – Československá strana lidová	KDU-ČSL	Jan Grolich	Centre to centre-right	Christian democracy; Social conservatism	16 / 200	12 / 81	53 / 675	1 / 21	EPP
Freedom and Direct Democracy; Svoboda a přímá demokracie	SPD	Tomio Okamura	Far-right	Euroscepticism; Neo-fascism; Right-wing populism	15 / 200	0 / 81	35 / 675	1 / 21	ESN
TOP 09	TOP 09	Matěj Ondřej Havel	Centre-right	Liberal conservatism; Pro-Europeanism; Fiscal conservatism	9 / 200	7 / 81	19 / 675	2 / 21	EPP
Motorists for Themselves; Motoristé sobě	AUTO	Petr Macinka	Right-wing to far-right	Right-wing populism; National conservatism	6 / 200	0 / 81	0 / 675	0 / 21	PfE
Czech Pirate Party; Česká pirátská strana	Piráti	Zdeněk Hřib	Centre to centre-left	Pirate politics; Liberalism	16 / 200	1 / 81	99 / 675	1 / 21	PPEU
Mayors for the Liberec Region; Starostové pro Liberecký kraj	SLK	Martin Půta	Centre-right	Regionalism	2 / 200	2 / 81	0 / 675	0 / 21	—N/a
SEN 21	SEN 21	Václav Láska	Syncretic	Liberalism; Pro-Europeanism	0 / 200	4 / 81	0 / 675	0 / 21	EDP
Svobodní	Svobodní	Libor Vondráček	Right-wing	National conservatism; Euroscepticism	1 / 200	1 / 81	0 / 675	0 / 21	—N/a
Green Party; Strana zelených	Zelení	Matěj Pomahač; Gabriela Svárovská	Centre-left	Green politics	2 / 200	0 / 81	0 / 675	0 / 21	EGP
Tricolour; Trikolora	Tricolour	Zuzana Majerová	Right-wing to far-right	Ultraconservatism	1 / 200	0 / 81	0 / 675	0 / 21	—N/a
Law, Respect, Expertise; Právo Respekt Odbornost	PRO	Jindřich Rajchl	Right-wing to far-right	Right-wing populism; National conservatism	1 / 200	0 / 81	0 / 675	0 / 21	—N/a
Social Democracy; Sociální demokracie	SOCDEM	Jiří Nedvěd	Centre-left	Social democracy	0 / 200	1 / 81	36 / 675	0 / 21	PES
Communist Party of Bohemia and Moravia; Komunistická strana Čech a Moravy	KSČM	Roman Roun	Left-wing to far-left	Communism	0 / 200	0 / 81	13 / 675	1 / 21	EL (observer)
Tábor 2020	T2020	Petr Havránek	Centre-right	Regionalism	0 / 200	1 / 81	2 / 675	0 / 21	—N/a
ForMOST; ProMOST	ProMOST	Marek Hrvol		Regionalism	0 / 200	1 / 81	2 / 675	0 / 21	—N/a
Přísaha	Přísaha	Robert Šlachta	Right-wing	Right-wing populism; Euroscepticism	0 / 200	1 / 81	0 / 675	0 / 21	P.eu
Independents; Nezávislí	NEZ	Patrik Hujdus	Big tent	Regionalism	0 / 200	1 / 81	0 / 675	0 / 21	—N/a
United Democrats – Association of Independents; Spojení demokraté – Sdružení nezávislých	SD-SN	Alena Dernerová	Centre-right	Conservatism; Euroscepticism	0 / 200	0 / 81	0 / 675	1 / 21	—N/a

Note: The sum of the total seats held by each party may not amount to the total seats as a whole in the Chamber, Senate, Regions, and/or European Parliament because of independent politicians (i.e. those not members of any political party) holding the remaining seats.

== Non-parliamentary parties ==
- Alliance for the Future (Aliance pro budoucnost)
- Club of Committed Non-Party Members (Klub angažovaných nestraníků)
- Conservative Party (Konzervativní strana)
- Czech National Social Party (Česká strana národně sociální)
- Czech Republic in First Place! (Česká republika na 1. místě!)
- Czech Sovereignty of Social Democracy (Česká suverenita sociální demokracie)
- Democratic Party of Greens (Demokratická strana zelených)
- Freeholder Party of the Czech Republic (Strana soukromníků České republiky)
- The Czech Crown (Koruna Česká)
- Liberal-Environmental Party (Liberálně-ekologická strana)
- The Moravians (Moravané)
- National Democracy (Národní demokracie)
- New Social Democracy (Nová sociální demokracie)
- Ostravak Citizens' Movement (Ostravak hnutí občanů)
- Our Czechia (Naše Česko)
- Right Bloc (Volte Pravý Blok)
- Severočeši.cz, cross-spectrum regional party from northern Bohemia.
- SNK European Democrats (SNK Evropští demokraté)
- Swiss Democracy (Švýcarská demokracie)
- The Left (Levice)
- Urza.cz (Nevolte Urza.cz)
- Hlas
- Us (My)
- Volt Czechia (Volt)

== Defunct parties ==
From 1990 to 1999

- Christian Democratic Party (Křesťanskodemokratická strana)
- Civic Movement (Občanské hnutí)
- Friends of Beer Party (Strana přátel piva)
- Left Bloc (Levý blok)
- Liberal Social Union (Liberálně sociální unie)
- Movement for Autonomous Democracy–Party for Moravia and Silesia (Hnutí za samosprávnou demokracii – Společnost pro Moravu a Slezsko)
- Party of the Democratic Left (Strana demokratické levice)

From 2000 to 2009

- Association of Radicals for the United States of Europe (Asociace radikálů za Spojené státy evropské)
- Civic Democratic Alliance (Občanská demokratická aliance)
- Democratic Union (Demokratická unie)
- Party of Conservative Accord (Strana konzervativní smlouvy)
- Party for Life Security (Strana za životní jistoty)

From 2010 to 2019

- Civic Conservative Party (Občanská konzervativní strana)
- Freedom Union – Democratic Union (Unie svobody – Demokratická unie)
- Dawn – National Coalition (Úsvit-Národní koalice)
- European Democratic Party (Evropská demokratická strana)
- Head Up – Electoral Bloc (Hlavu vzhůru – volební blok)
- Liberal Reform Party (Liberální reformní strana)
- National Party (Národní strana)
- Path of Change (Cesta změny)
- Public Affairs (Věci veřejné)
- Realists (Realisté)
- Workers' Party (Dělnická strana)

Since 2020

- Alliance of National Forces (Aliance národních sil)
- National Socialists – Left of the 21st century (Národní socialisté)
- Czech National Socialist Party (Česká strana národně socialistická)
- Independence Party of the Czech Republic (Strana nezávislosti České republiky)
- Masaryk Democratic Party (Masarykova demokratická strana)
- Party of Civic Rights (Strana práv občanů)
- Party of Common Sense (Strana zdravého rozumu)
- Party for the Open Society (Strana pro otevřenou společnost)
- Rally for the Republic – Republican Party of Czechoslovakia (Sdružení pro republiku – Republikánská strana Československa)
- Workers' Party of Social Justice (Dělnická strana sociální spravedlnosti)

== See also ==
- Lists of political parties
- List of political parties in Czechoslovakia
- Liberalism in the Czech Republic
