= Senate district 69 – Frýdek-Místek =

Electoral district in the Czech Republic

69 – Frýdek-Místek
- inline Senate district of the Czech Republic

- The Frýdek-Místek district on a map
- Senator: Petr Korč; NMFM
- Region: Moravian-Silesian
- District: Frýdek-Místek
- Last election: 2026
- Next election: 2032

Senate district 69 – Frýdek-Místek is an electoral district of the Senate of the Czech Republic, located in the western part of the Frýdek-Místek District. Since 2026, the Senator for the district has been Petr Korč of NMFM.

== Senators ==
Year	Senator	Party
1996	Věra Vašínková	ČSSD
2002	František Kopecký	ODS
2008	Eva Richtrová	ČSSD
2014	Jiří Carbol	KDU-ČSL
2020	Helena Pešatová	STAN
2026	Petr Korč	NMFM

== Election results ==
=== 1996 ===
1996 Czech Senate election in Frýdek-Místek
Candidate	Party	1st round		2nd round	
Candidate	Party	Votes	%	Votes	%
Věra Vašínková	ČSSD	10 184	28,32	19 717	52,46
Jan Káš	ODS	13 401	37,27	17 870	47,54
Oldřich Pospíšil	KSČM	5 869	16,32	—	—
Zdeněk Stolař	ODA	5 550	15,43	—	—
Miloslav Komínek	PA	955	2,66	—	—

=== 2002 ===
2002 Czech Senate election in Frýdek-Místek
Candidate	Party	1st round		2nd round	
Candidate	Party	Votes	%	Votes	%
František Kopecký	ODS	5 968	22,62	20 228	56,77
Ivan Vrba	KSČM	5 537	20,99	15 401	43,22
Pavol Lukša	KDU-ČSL	5 146	19,51	—	—
Věra Vašínková	ČSSD	4 996	18,94	—	—
Zdeněk Stolař	ODA	2 590	9,81	—	—
Lev Mojžíšek	Independent	1 053	3,99	—	—
Hans Postl	Independent	554	2,10	—	—
Dagmar Lahnerová	MODS	532	2,01	—	—

=== 2008 ===
2008 Czech Senate election in Frýdek-Místek
Candidate	Party	1st round		2nd round	
Candidate	Party	Votes	%	Votes	%
Eva Richtrová	ČSSD	18 519	41,86	23 224	68,22
František Kopecký	ODS	9 891	22,35	10 816	31,77
Svatomír Recman	KSČM	7 154	16,17	—	—
Petr Hartmann	KDU-ČSL	5 900	13,33	—	—
Libor Tobola	NEZ/DEM	2 773	6,26	—	—

=== 2014 ===
2014 Czech Senate election in Frýdek-Místek
Candidate	Party	1st round		2nd round	
Candidate	Party	Votes	%	Votes	%
Jiří Carbol	KDU-ČSL	8 072	21,94	10 797	56,01
Jiří Hájek	ČSSD	7 219	19,62	8 479	43,98
Stanislav Fridrich	ANO 2011	7 082	19,25	—	—
Ivan Vrba	KSČM	4 758	12,93	—	—
Slavomír Bača	TOP 09, STAN	4 354	11,83	—	—
Martin Adamec	NMFM	3 356	9,12	—	—
Eva Pastušková	ODS	1 948	5,29	—	—

=== 2020 ===
2020 Czech Senate election in Frýdek-Místek
Candidate	Party	1st round		2nd round	
Candidate	Party	Votes	%	Votes	%
Helena Pešatová	STAN	7 422	20,71	7 966	54,03
Jiří Carbol	KDU-ČSL, NMFM	7 770	21,69	6 775	45,96
Radim Bača	ANK 2020	4 733	13,21	—	—
Radim Mamula	ANO 2011	4 686	13,08	—	—
Pavol Lukša	DV 2016	2 576	7,19	—	—
Karel Deutscher	ČSSD	2 380	6,64	—	—
Radomil Bodzsar	SPD	1 960	5,47	—	—
Pavel Olšovský	VOK	1 528	4,26	—	—
Daniel Pawlas	KSČM	1 449	4,04	—	—
Jaroslav Matýs	Tricolour	1 318	3,67	—	—

=== 2026 ===
2026 Czech Senate election in Frýdek-Místek
Candidate	Party	1st round		2nd round	
Candidate	Party	Votes	%	Votes	%
Petr Korč	NMFM	14 095	32,47	11 321	52,09
Helena Pešatová	STAN, TOP 09, Pirates	15 085	34,75	10 409	47,90
Tomáš Krpel	SPD	5 647	13,01	—	—
Zdeněk Navrátil	rEvoluce	4 140	9,53	—	—
Nela Lisková	Nezlomní	2 123	4,89	—	—
René Hompora	Swiss Democracy	1 334	3,07	—	—
Petr Hrnčárek	KSČM	981	2,26	—	—
