= Senate district 51 – Žďár nad Sázavou =

Electoral district in the Czech Republic

51 – Žďár nad Sázavou
- inline Senate district of the Czech Republic

- The Žďár nad Sázavou district on a map
- Senator: Josef Klement; KDU-ČSL
- Region: Vysočina
- District: Žďár nad Sázavou
- Last election: 2026
- Next election: 2032

Senate district 51 – Žďár nad Sázavou is an electoral district of the Senate of the Czech Republic, located in the entirety of the Žďár nad Sázavou District. Since 2020, the Senator for the district is Josef Klement for KDU-ČSL.

== Senators ==
Year	Senator	Party
1996	Jiří Šenkýř	KDU-ČSL
2002	Josef Novotný	SNK
2008	Dagmar Zvěřinová	ČSSD
2014	František Bradáč	KDU-ČSL
2020	Josef Klement	KDU-ČSL

== Election results ==
=== 1996 ===
1996 Czech Senate election in Žďár nad Sázavou
Candidate	Party	1st round		2nd round	
Candidate	Party	Votes	%	Votes	%
Jiří Šenkýř	KDU-ČSL	9 198	23,20	16 442	57,61
Miroslava Němcová	ODS	12 202	30,78	12 096	42,39
Stanislav Kopal	ČSSD	8 750	22,07	—	—
Bohumil Kotlán	KSČM	6 944	17,52	—	—
Zdeněk Vyhlídal	NEZ	2 218	5,60	—	—
Jaromír Lavický	MSLK_96	328	0,83	—	—

=== 2002 ===
2002 Czech Senate election in Žďár nad Sázavou
Candidate	Party	1st round		2nd round	
Candidate	Party	Votes	%	Votes	%
Josef Novotný	SNK	10 201	34,51	24 167	61,06
Jan Dřínek	Independent	6 458	21,84	15 407	38,93
Jiří Šenkýř	KDU-ČSL	6 393	21,62	—	—
Alois Koukola	KSČM	3 848	13,01	—	—
Miroslav Sedlařík	ODS	2 657	8,98	—	—

=== 2008 ===
2008 Czech Senate election in Žďár nad Sázavou
Candidate	Party	1st round		2nd round	
Candidate	Party	Votes	%	Votes	%
Dagmar Zvěřinová	ČSSD	14 263	33,98	18 982	59,31
Josef Novotný	SNK ED	9 706	23,12	13 018	40,68
Josef Mach	KDU-ČSL	6 100	14,53	—	—
Jaromír Brychta	ODS	5 607	13,35	—	—
Jan Slámečka	KSČM	4 438	10,57	—	—
Květoslav Šafránek	SN	973	2,31	—	—
Zdeněk Tomášek	„21"	885	2,10	—	—

=== 2014 ===
2014 Czech Senate election in Žďár nad Sázavou
Candidate	Party	1st round		2nd round	
Candidate	Party	Votes	%	Votes	%
František Bradáč	KDU-ČSL	8 683	20,70	10 848	53,22
Dagmar Zvěřinová	ČSSD	11 636	27,74	9 533	46,77
Jaroslav Ptáček	ODS	4 746	11,31	—	—
Petr Novák	Independent	4 329	10,32	—	—
Petr Stoček	KSČM	2 706	6,45	—	—
Ladislav Stalmach	STO	2 507	5,97	—	—
Jiří Nekovář	Dawn	2 205	5,25	—	—
Jiří Havlíček	TOP 09, STAN	1 328	3,16	—	—
Josef Mička	SPO	1 307	3,11	—	—
Josef Fendrych	Svobodní	1 090	2,59	—	—
Ivo Kaštan	O.K. party	844	2,01	—	—
Miloš Komínek	SVAZ	564	1,34	—	—

=== 2020 ===
2020 Czech Senate election in Žďár nad Sázavou
Candidate	Party	1st round		2nd round	
Candidate	Party	Votes	%	Votes	%
Josef Klement	KDU-ČSL	10 660	31,01	10 713	59,81
Michal Šmarda	ČSSD, Greens, Budoucnost	8 691	25,28	7 198	40,18
Ivana Horká	NeKa	6 853	19,93	—	—
Libor Černý	ANO 2011	5 018	14,60	—	—
Bohumil Kasal	SPD	1 644	4,78	—	—
Zdeněk Střítecký	KSČM	1 503	4,37	—	—

=== 2026 ===
2026 Czech Senate election in Žďár nad Sázavou
Candidate	Party	1st round		2nd round	
Candidate	Party	Votes	%	Votes	%
~~Josef Klement~~	~~KDU-ČSL~~	~~11 373~~	~~25,62~~	~~11 613~~	~~54,08~~
~~Michal Šmarda~~	~~Volt, SOM, HR~~	~~12 254~~	~~27,60~~	~~9 858~~	~~45,91~~
~~Radek Černý~~	~~ODS, Pirates, STO~~	~~11 372~~	~~25,62~~	—	—
~~Radek Koten~~	~~SPD~~	~~7 320~~	~~16,49~~	—	—
~~David Moos~~	~~SD-SN~~	~~2 067~~	~~4,65~~	—	—
