= Jiří Lobkowicz =

Jiří Lobkowicz may refer to:

- Jiří Lobkowicz (politician) (born 1956), Czech businessman and politician
- Jiří Lobkowicz (racing driver) (1907–1932), Czech aristocrat and racing driver
