= 2026 Czech Senate election =

- 9–10 October 2026 (first round); 16–17 October 2026 (second round)

27 of the 81 seats in the Senate
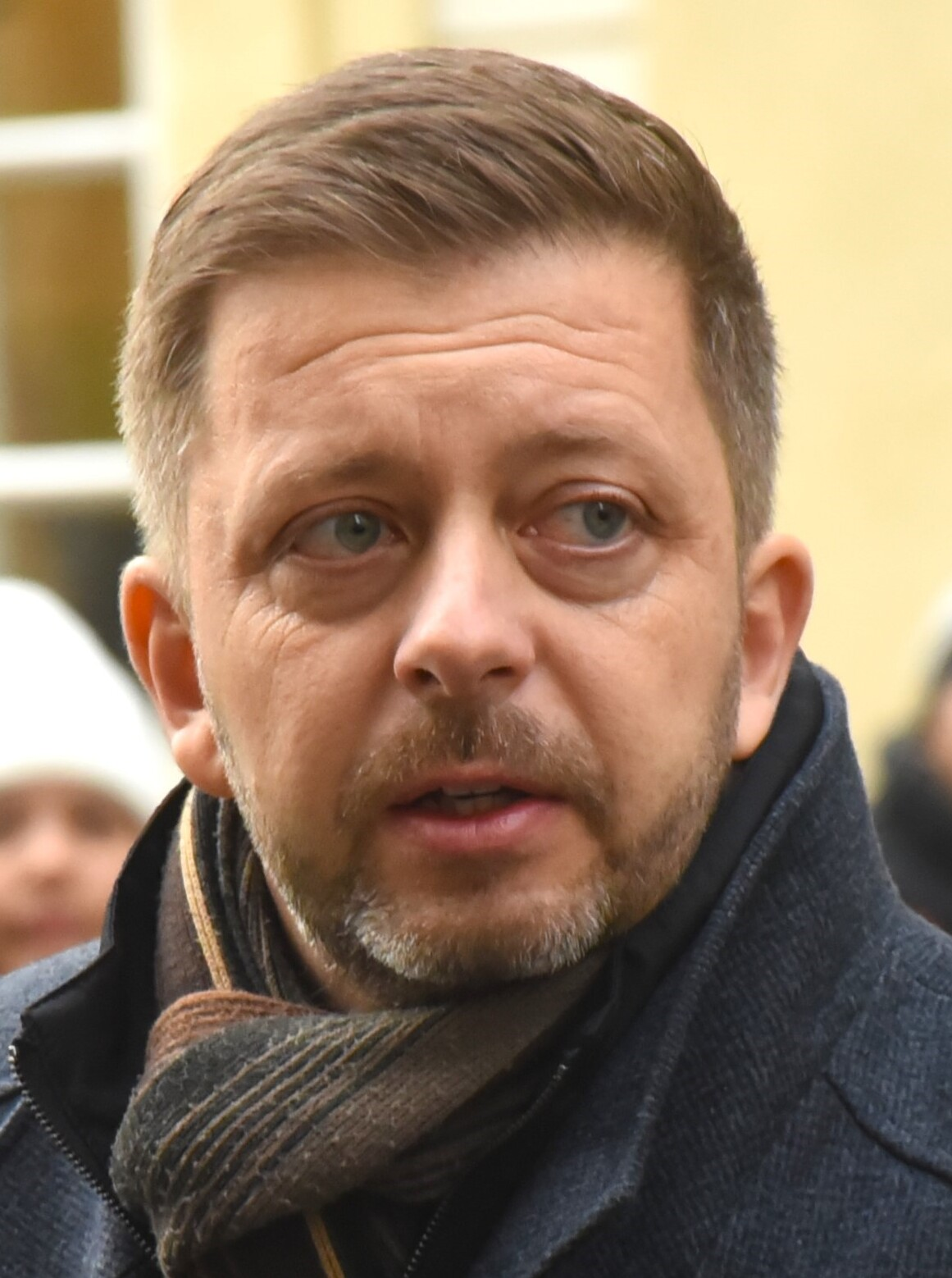

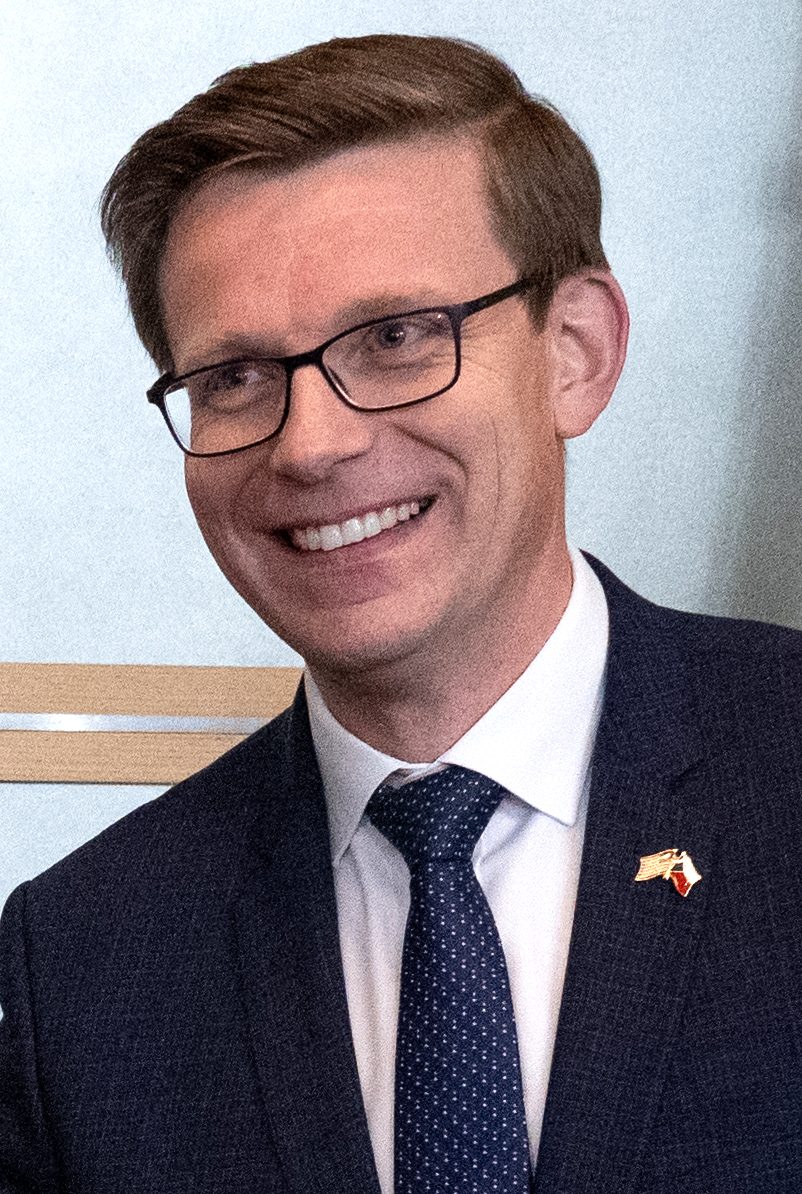

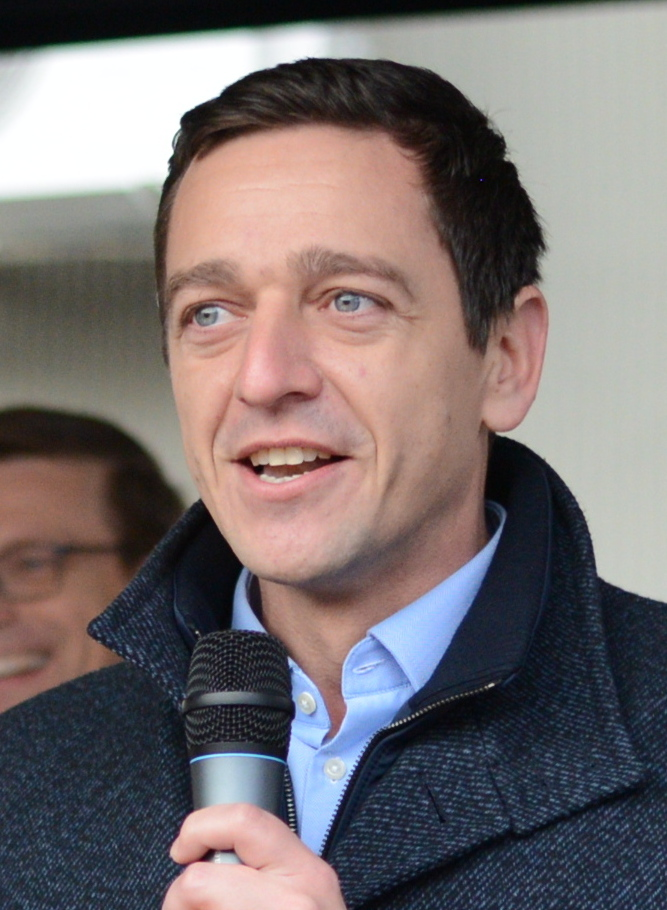

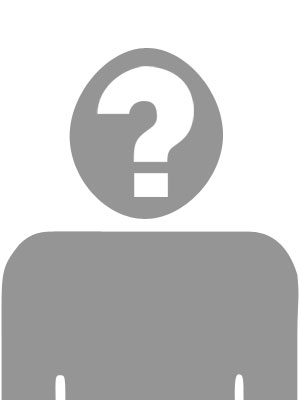

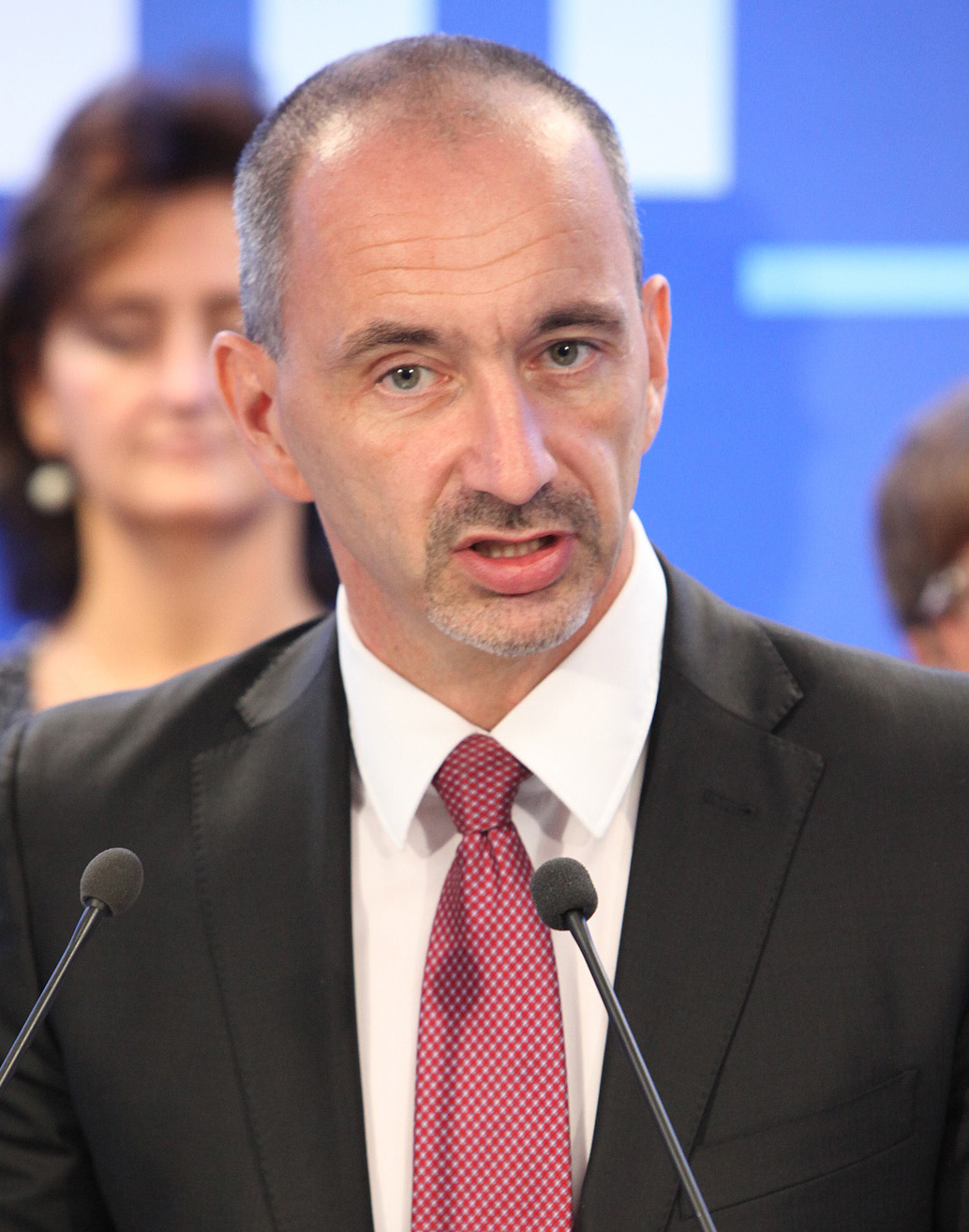

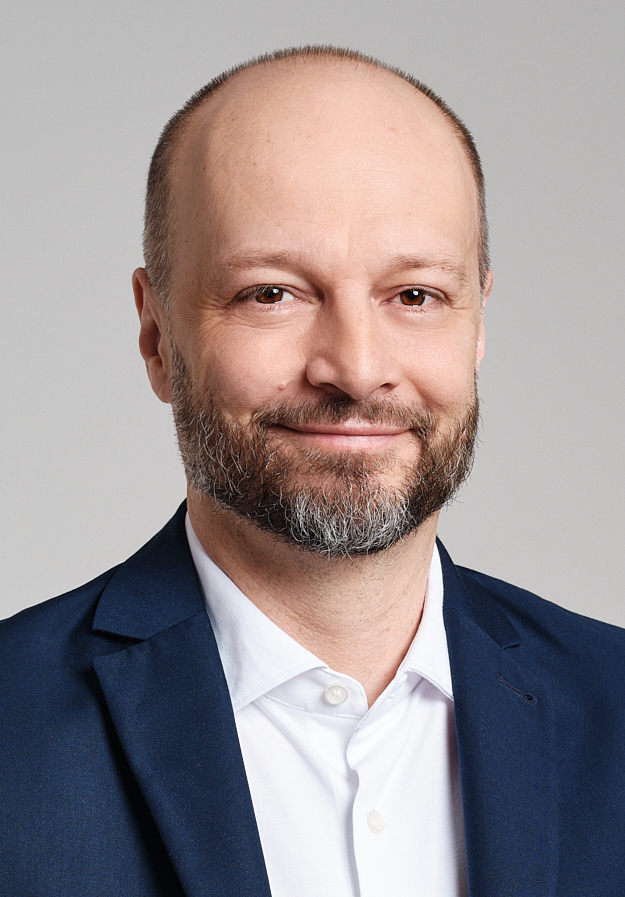

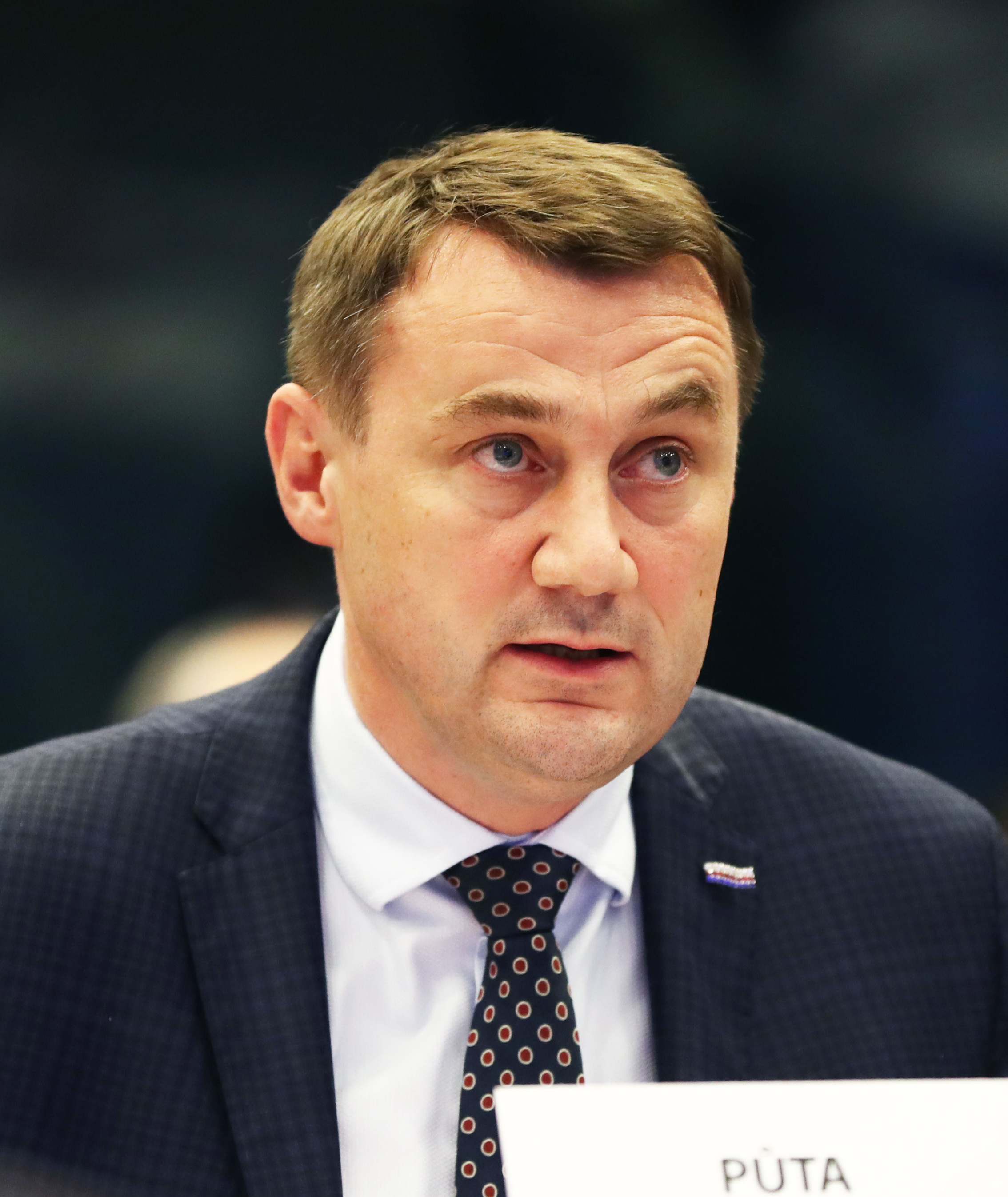

	First party	Second party	Third party
Leader	Vít Rakušan	Martin Kupka	Jan Grolich
Party	STAN	ODS	KDU-ČSL
Seats before	15	18	12
Seats won	9	7	2
Seats after	14	20	12
Seat change	▼1	▲2	Steady
	Fourth party	Fifth party	Sixth party
Leader	Matěj Ondřej Havel	Martin Kuba	Václav Láska
Party	TOP 09	NČ	SEN 21
Seats before	7	0	4
Seats won	2	1	1
Seats after	7	1	3
Seat change	Steady	▲1	▼1
	Seventh party	Eighth party
Leader	Martin Půta	Ivo Vondrák
Party	SLK	OK
Seats before	3	0
Seats won	1	1
Seats after	3	1
Seat change	Steady	▲1
Senate President before election
Miloš Vystrčil
ODS
Elected Senate President
TBD

The first round of the election to the Senate, the upper house of the Parliament of the Czech Republic, were held on 9 and 10 October 2026, along with the 2026 municipal elections. In districts where second round run-off was necessary, voters elected a Senator by a simple majority on 16 and 17 October.

Governing ANO 2011 of prime minister Andrej Babiš failed to win any of the 27 contested seats while losing the single defending seat. This marked the first in history where governing parties did not win a single seat. The Civic Democratic Party gained the most seats with two, expanding their total in the chamber to 20 seats. Mayors and Independents party won the most contested seats with nine, but also lost a one seat overall. The Pirate Party lost their only Senator, leaving it with no presence in the chamber for the first time since 2012. Voter turnout was 43.31% in the first round and 21.12% in the second round.

In Senate district 51, whose first round outcome was decided by just a single vote, a repeat of both the first and second round was ordered by the Supreme Administrative Court, after irregularities were found that affected the outcome of the election.

== Electoral districts ==
The senate elections were conducted in the following 27 districts:

- 3 – Cheb
- 6 – Louny
- 9 – Plzeň-City
- 12 – Strakonice
- 15 – Pelhřimov
- 18 – Příbram
- 21 – Prague 5
- 24 – Prague 9
- 27 – Prague 1
- 30 – Kladno
- 33 – Děčín
- 36 – Česká Lípa
- 39 – Trutnov
- 42 – Kolín
- 45 – Hradec Králové
- 48 – Rychnov nad Kněžnou
- 51 – Žďár nad Sázavou
- 54 – Znojmo
- 57 – Vyškov
- 60 – Brno-City
- 63 – Přerov
- 66 – Litovel
- 69 – Frýdek-Místek
- 72 – Ostrava-City
- 75 – Karviná
- 78 – Zlín
- 81 – Uherské Hradiště

== Electoral system ==
The Senate of the Czech Republic has 81 members elected in 81 single-member constituencies. One third of the seats is contested every two years, and senators serve six-year terms.

Senators are elected using a two-round system. A candidate who receives more than 50% of valid votes in the first round is elected. If no candidate reaches that threshold, a second round is held between the two candidates with the highest vote totals, and the candidate with the higher number of votes wins.

Candidates may be nominated by registered political parties or stand as independents, who must submit at least 1,000 signatures from voters in the constituency. The minimum age to stand for election is 40, and the voting age is 18.

== Composition of contested seats before the elections ==
Most seats up for the election, 11 out of 27, are held by STAN and SLK alliance, in which 10 of them held by STAN party. The ODS and TOP 09 aliance are defending 8 seats, with 5 of these being held by ODS, two by TOP 09 and one by Svobodní. Progressive pack composed of Pirates, SEN 21 and HDK have incumbent in four districts, with SEN 21 defending two seats, and Pirates and HDK in one seat each. KDU-ČSL party has three seats up in this election.

Governing ANO 2011 defend only one seat in this election.

Seats up for election
Senate groups		Ideology	Leader	Seats	
STAN	Mayors and Independents	Liberalism	Vít Rakušan	10 / 27	11 / 27
STAN	Mayors for the Liberec Region	Regionalism	Martin Půta	1 / 27	11 / 27
ODS and TOP 09	Civic Democratic Party	Conservatism	Martin Kupka	5 / 27	8 / 27
ODS and TOP 09	TOP 09	Liberal conservatism	Matěj Ondřej Havel	2 / 27	8 / 27
ODS and TOP 09	Svobodní	Libertarian conservatism	Libor Vondráček	1 / 27	8 / 27
Pirates and SEN 21	SEN 21	Liberalism	Václav Láska	2 / 27	4 / 27
Pirates and SEN 21	Czech Pirate Party	Pirate politics	Zdeněk Hřib	1 / 27	4 / 27
Pirates and SEN 21	HDK	Localism	Jan Holásek	1 / 27	4 / 27
KDU-ČSL		Christian democracy	Jan Grolich	3 / 27	
ANO 2011		Right-wing populism	Andrej Babiš	1 / 27	

== Results ==
Party	First round			Second round			Seats			
Party	Votes	%	Seats	Votes	%	Seats	Won	Not up	Total	+/–
ANO 2011	259,202	22.45	0	102,148	21.58	0	0	11	11	–1
Mayors and Independents	219,787	19.04	2	143,726	30.37	7	9	5	14	–1
Civic Democratic Party	163,226	14.14	0	104,827	22.15	7	7	13	20	+2
KDU-ČSL	90,586	7.85	1	26,282	5.55	2	3	9	12	0
Freedom and Direct Democracy	57,301	4.96	0				0	0	0	0
TOP 09	51,686	4.48	1	12,422	2.62	1	2	5	7	0
Our Czechia	32,146	2.78	1				1	0	1	+1
Czech Pirate Party	24,563	2.13	0	10,524	2.22	0	0	0	0	–1
SEN 21	21,379	1.85	0	12,205	2.58	1	1	2	3	–1
Law, Respect, Expertise	15,026	1.30	0				0	0	0	0
Our city F-M	14,095	1.22	0	11,321	2.39	1	1	0	1	+1
Mayors for the Liberec Region	14,052	1.22	0	14,287	3.02	1	1	2	3	0
Svobodní	13,975	1.21	0				0	0	0	–1
24/7	13,544	1.17	0	13,201	2.79	1	1	0	1	+1
Volt Czechia	12,254	1.06	0	9,858	2.08	0	0	0	0	0
By Heart and Reason	11,799	1.02	0				0	0	0	0
Prague Together	9,824	0.85	0	6,608	1.40	0	0	0	0	0
Communist Party of Bohemia and Moravia	9,181	0.80	0				0	0	0	0
Přísaha	7,951	0.69	0				0	1	1	0
Stačilo!	7,672	0.66	0				0	0	0	0
Czech National Social Party	6,073	0.53	0				0	0	0	0
We Develop Hradec	5,573	0.48	0				0	0	0	–1
Green Party	5,292	0.46	0				0	0	0	0
United Democrats – Association of Independents	5,193	0.45	0				0	0	0	0
JsmePro!	4,617	0.40	0				0	0	0	0
Choice for the Region	4,194	0.36	0				0	0	0	0
rEvoluce	4,140	0.36	0				0	0	0	0
Zvuk 12	4,124	0.36	0				0	0	0	0
Challenge 2025	4,066	0.35	0				0	0	0	0
Circle Movement	4,052	0.35	0				0	0	0	0
MHNHRM	3,574	0.31	0				0	0	0	0
Personalities for the Region	3,411	0.30	0	5,836	1.23	1	1	0	1	+1
Czech Farmers' Party	3,106	0.27	0				0	0	0	0
Pro Plzeň	3,043	0.26	0				0	0	0	0
Movement Voice of Regions	2,683	0.23	0				0	0	0	0
Swiss Democracy	2,651	0.23	0				0	0	0	0
Social Democracy	2,456	0.21	0				0	0	0	0
Political Movement Unbroken	2,123	0.18	0				0	0	0	0
Alliance for the Future	2,108	0.18	0				0	0	0	0
Ostravak	2,071	0.18	0				0	0	0	0
Association for Local Administration	2,014	0.17	0				0	0	0	0
Bright Signal of the Independents	1,637	0.14	0				0	0	0	0
The Left	1,540	0.13	0				0	0	0	0
Brave Czechia	1,414	0.12	0				0	0	0	0
Czech Sovereignty of Social Democracy	1,128	0.10	0				0	0	0	0
Civic-Political Foundation ReMeK	624	0.05	0				0	0	0	0
Generation Movement	597	0.05	0				0	0	0	0
GEN	490	0.04	0				0	0	0	0
Jsme team	347	0.03	0				0	0	0	0
Independents			0				0	1	1	0
ProMOST			0				0	1	1	0
Tábor 2020			0				0	1	1	0
Independents	20,817	1.80	0				0	3	3	0
Total	1,154,407	100.00	5	473,245	100.00	22	27	54	81	0
Valid votes	1,154,407	95.80		473,245	99.48					
Invalid/blank votes	50,576	4.20		2,469	0.52					
Total votes	1,204,983	100.00		475,714	100.00					
Registered voters/turnout	2,781,935	43.31		2,252,325	21.12					
Source: Volby
