= Personalities for the Region =

Personalities for the Region Osobnosti pro kraj
- Abbreviation: OK
- Chairman: Ivo Vondrák
- Vice Chairman: Zdeněk Karásek
- Founders: Ivo Vondrák; Zdeněk Karásek
- Founded: 11 January 2024
- Registered: 29 February 2024
- Split from: ANO 2011
- Headquarters: Výstavní 2224/8 709 00 Ostrava
- Ideology: Regionalism; Liberal conservatism Economic liberalism
- Political position: Centre-right
- Colours: Teal; Turquoise
- Chamber of Deputies: 0 / 200
- Senate: 1 / 81
- European Parliament: 0 / 21
- Regional councils: 6 / 675

Website
- hnutiok.cz

Personalities for the Region (Czech: Osobnosti pro kraj, OK, styled as Hnutí O.k.) is a Czech political party founded by MP and former Moravian-Silesian Region Governor Ivo Vondrák, after his departure from ANO 2011. It was officially registered on 29 February 2024.

== Leadership ==
Since May 2024, the chairman of the movement is Ivo Vondrák, the deputy chairman is Zdeněk Karásek, and the members of the regional executive board are Libor Witassek, Jan Tabášek, Daniel Kończyna, Petr Hošek, Dalibor Halátek, Jaroslav Svoboda and Eva Pyrtová.

== History ==
In the 2024 regional elections, OK ran for the Moravian-Silesian Regional Assembly in a joint list with the Mayors and Independents (STAN). The leader of the "Mayors and Personalities for the Region" list was OK leader Ivo Vondrák, with STAN MP Michaela Šebelová in second place. The coalition received 14.67% of the votes and 11 seats, of which 6 went to OK.

In the 2024 Senate election, the candidate of the STAN–OK coalition in a District № 68 – Opava was Michael Rataj, mayor of the municipality of Branka u Opavy. In the first round, he finished 4th with 5.51% of the votes, and did not advance to the runoff.

== Election results ==
=== Senate ===
Election	First round			Second round			Seats	Total seats	+/–
Election	Votes	%	Place	Votes	%	Place	Seats	Total seats	+/–
2024	1,819	Ran only in coalitions					0 / 27	0 / 81	New
2026	3,411	0.30	32th	5,836	1.23	13th	1 / 27	1 / 81	▲1

=== Regional councils ===
Election	Vote	%	Seats	+/–	Position
2024	41,525	1.74	6 / 675	New	11th
