= Unified – Alternative for Patriots =

Unified Jednotní
- Founders: Lubomír Volný; Marian Bojko; Ivana Nevludová
- Founded: 15 March 2019
- Dissolved: 19 April 2022
- Split from: Freedom and Direct Democracy
- Merged into: Free Bloc
- Ideology: Czech nationalism Direct democracy Hard Euroscepticism; Right-wing populism Conspiracy theorism
- Political position: Far-right
- Chamber of Deputies: 0 / 200

Website
- jednotni.com

Unified – Alternative for Patriots (Czech: Jednotní – alternativa pro patrioty) was a political party in the Czech Republic, which existed from 2019 until 2022. It was founded by three MPs from Freedom and Direct Democracy (SPD) after they left the party. The party participated in the 2019 European Parliament election on the "Alternative for the Czech Republic" list.

The party was vocally opposed to government restrictions related to the COVID-19 pandemic. MPs Volný and Bojko refused to wear protective facial wear in the Chamber of Deputies on several occasions, and Volný was arrested on 7 March 2021 at a demonstration against government measures, for failing to observe hygiene laws. Volný also received media attention after asserting on social media that COVID-19 was an "artificial biological weapon" being deliberately spread from aeroplanes.
