= Jiří Lobkowicz (politician) =

Czech entrepreneur (born 1956)

Jiří Jan Lobkowicz (Czech pronunciation; born 1956) is a Swiss-born Czech politician and businessman. He is a member of the Lobkowicz family.

He was president of the Path of Change party in the Czech Republic. On 3 May 2012, the party decided to dissolve.

He lives in the town of Mělník in the Czech Republic.
