= GEN (political party) =

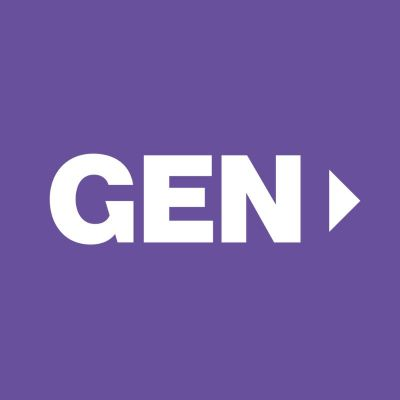
- Abbreviation: GEN
- Chairperson: Vojtěch Ryvola
- Founded: 25 October 2024
- Split from: ANO
- Membership: >300
- Ideology: Liberal conservatism Economic liberalism
- Political position: Centre-right
- Colors: Purple

Website
- gen2025.cz

GEN (Czech: Generace, ekonomika, naděje, lit. 'Generation, economy, hope') is a Czech liberal-conservative political party, founded by former ANO councilor Vojtěch Ryvola in October 2024.

The party initially intended to run in the 2025 parliamentary election, but eventually did not.

== Ideology ==
Ryvola stated that he founded the party as an alternative for "discontented voters". He said the party would aim to lower the prices of electricity and natural gas for households as its first priority.

The party asserts that it stands for right-wing values, entrepreneurship, a smaller state, and limiting of bureaucracy. It also supports nationalisation of critical infrastructure.

GEN supports the Czech Republic's membership in the European Union and NATO, though Ryvola has criticised the "lack of leadership" inside the EU.

== Election results ==
=== Senate ===
Election	First round			Second round			Seats	Total seats	+/–
Election	Votes	%	Place	Votes	%	Place	Seats	Total seats	+/–
2026	490	0.04	48th				0 / 27	0 / 81	New
