= Masaryk Democratic Party =

Masaryk Democratic Party Masarykova demokratická strana
- Leader: Michal Chromec
- Founded: 25 May 1992
- Dissolved: 2022
- Headquarters: Alšova 2891/2A, Přerov
- Ideology: Progressivism; Masarykism; Pro-Europeanism
- Political position: Centre
- Colours: Blue
- Slogan: Pravda a láska může zvítězit. Ale dá to práci!

Party flag

The Masaryk Democratic Party (Czech: Masarykova demokratická strana, MDS) was a centrist political party in the Czech Republic, founded on 25 May 1992. The party followed the legacy of the first Czechoslovak President Tomáš Garrigue Masaryk, and considered itself a successor to the historical Czech Realist Party.

== History ==
In the 2002 and 2006 municipal elections, the party co-operated with the Czech National Social Party and the Party for the Open Society. In the 2014 Czech Senate election, party leader Michal Chromec ran for election in the Přerov district on the list of the Czech Social Democratic Party, but failed to qualify for the second round.

The party was dissolved in 2022.

== Leaders ==
- Otomar Venzhöfer (2001–2012)
- Michal Chromec (since 2012)
