= Swiss Democracy (Czech Republic) =

Czech political party

Swiss Democracy Švýcarská demokracie
- Chairperson: Tomáš Raždík
- Founded: 21 July 2010
- Headquarters: Alšovo náměstí 4, Ostrava
- Ideology: Direct democracy Social conservatism Euroscepticism; Anti-vaccine activism
- Political position: Right-wing
- Colors: Red
- Chamber of Deputies: 0 / 200
- Senate: 0 / 81
- European Parliament: 0 / 21

Website
- svycarska-demokracie.cz

Swiss Democracy (Czech: Švýcarská demokracie) is a Czech political party advocating for direct democracy and the adoption of a new constitution inspired by the Swiss model, founded in 2021.

== History ==
Swiss Democracy was founded in 2021, during the COVID-19 pandemic, as a party opposing the imposed anti-pandemic restrictions. It contested the 2021 Czech parliamentary election, led by molecular geneticist and anti-vaccination activist Soňa Peková and its founder Tomáš Ráždík, and presented lists in all 14 electoral regions. The party earned 0.31% of the vote, and failed to meet the electoral threshold.

During the COVID-19 pandemic, the party participated in protests challenging the anti-pandemic restrictions in place, led by the Chcípl PES movement and together with Tricolour, Svobodní, Free bloc and other parties in organisations.

In 2022, Swiss Democracy took part in a series of anti-governmental protest under banner of Czech Republic First!, criticising the Cabinet of Petr Fiala.

It contested the 2024 European Parliament election together with the Party of the State of Direct Democracy – Party of Labour, running on a eurosceptic platform. It gained 0.09% of the vote and no seats in the European Parliament.

The party contested 4 out of 27 districts in the 2024 Czech Senate election, but did not qualify for the second round in any of them.

== Ideology ==
Swiss democracy calls for the adoption of a new constitution, "copied" from the Swiss counterpart, citing Switzerland's high prosperity compared to other European nations.

The party maintains the opinion that the 2003 Czech European Union membership referendum was manipulated, and that Czech Republic should leave the European Union, and maintain its foreign relationships with other European countries by bilateral agreements.

During the COVID-19 pandemic, the party called the acting cabinet of Andrej Babiš "neo-marxist" and Prime Minister Babiš a "dictator".

== Electoral results ==
=== Chamber of Deputies ===
Election	List leader	Votes	%	Seats
2021	Tomáš Raždík	16,823	0.31 (#12)	0 / 200
2025	Tomáš Raždík	12,097	0.22 (#11)	0 / 200

=== Senate ===
Election	Candidates	First round				Second round			Seats	+/–
Election	Candidates	Votes	%	Runners-up	Place	Votes	%	Place	Seats	+/–
2024	4	3,859	0.5	0 / 27	20th	—			0 / 27	New
2026	3	2,651	0.23	0 / 27	36th	—			0 / 27	0

=== European Parliament ===
Election	List leader	Votes	%	Seats
2024 (Note: Ran in a coalition with SSPD-SP)	Pynelopi Cimprichová	2,559	0.09 (#25)	0 / 21
