= Path of Change =

Path of Change Cesta změny
- Leader: Jiří Lobkowicz
- Founded: 22 October 2001
- Dissolved: 3 May 2009
- Split from: Freedom Union
- Ideology: Liberalism
- European affiliation: European Liberal Democrat and Reform Party; European Democratic Party

Path of Change (sometimes translated as Way to Change, in Czech: Cesta změny) was a small liberal party in the Czech Republic. The party was led by Jiří Lobkowicz. It has no members of parliament and no elected councillors in local government.

The party was a founding member of the European Democratic Party (EDP), which together with the European Liberal Democrat and Reform Party (ELDR) form the Alliance of Liberals and Democrats for Europe (ALDE). It had joined the ELDR before it joined the EDP.

On 3 May 2009 the party decided to dissolve.

== See also ==
- Liberalism
- Contributions to liberal theory
- Liberalism worldwide
- List of liberal parties
- Liberal democracy
- Liberalism in the Czech lands
