= Party for the Open Society =

Party for the Open Society Strana pro otevřenou společnost
- Leader: Pavel Rytíř
- Founded: 23 February 1998; 28 years ago
- Dissolved: 27 December 2023; 2 years ago
- Split from: Czech National Social Party
- Ideology: Liberalism; Social liberalism
- Political position: Centre to centre-left
- European affiliation: European Democratic Party (former member)

Website
- www.stranaos.cz

The Party for the Open Society (Czech: Strana pro otevřenou společnost, SOS) is a minor social liberal political party in the Czech Republic.

The party origins were in the Civic Movement (Czech: Občanské Hnutí), a liberal group founded in 1991 within Civic Forum. In 1993 the party was renamed the Free Democrats (Czech: Svobodní Demokraté). After poor results in local elections in 1994, the party merged with the Liberal National Social Party (LSNS) to become the Free Democrats-Liberal National Social Party (Czech: Svobodní Demokraté - Liberální strana národně sociální). The merged party again returned poor results in parliamentary elections in 1996, and amid political disagreements over the nationalist views of ex-members of the LSNS, many Free Democrats left the party in 1997, forming the Party for the Open Society in 1998, with 120-150 members.

The party's political programme places highest importance on sustainable development. At the 2006 parliamentary elections, several SOS members were candidates on Green Party lists, but none were elected. In 2006 the SOS had local organisations in four of 13 regions in the Czech Republic, and in Prague. SOS did not stand any candidates in the 2010 parliamentary elections, instead urging its supporters once again to support the Green Party.

SOS also supports the Club of Committed Non-Party Members and other liberal parties. The independent senator Soňa Paukrtová was nominated for re-election by SOS, and was re-elected on 28 October 2006.

== See also ==
- Liberalism in the Czech lands
