= Club of Committed Non-Party Members =

Czech political party

Club of Committed Non-Party Members Klub angažovaných nestraníků
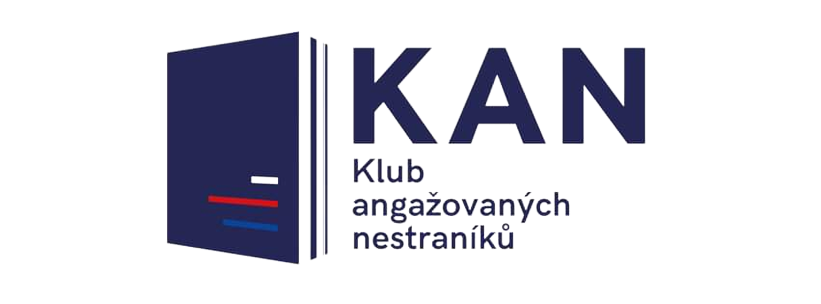
- Leader: František Laudát
- Founded: 1968/1990
- Youth wing: Mladí KANu
- Ideology: Liberal conservatism
- Political position: Centre-right to right-wing
- Colors: Port Gore
- Local councils: 2 / 61,780

Website
- http://www.kan.cz/

The Club of Committed Non-Party Members (in Czech Klub angažovaných nestraníků, KAN) is a small liberal conservative party in the Czech Republic co-founded by Rudolf Battěk.

== History ==
The party was founded during the Prague Spring in May 1968 by 144 leading Czechoslovak intellectuals and prominent social figures. It was formed as an independent activist organisation with the purpose of advocating a reform program. It committed itself to human rights and civil equality, political pluralism, and the principles embodied in the UN Declaration on human rights. During its peak, it claimed to have almost 15,000 members. The Soviet Army formally proscribed it in September 1968.

After the Velvet Revolution of 1989, KAN was reorganized in 1990 as a party, but it has not gained wide support in the elections and is not represented in the parliament.

== Election results ==
=== European Parliament ===
Election	List leader	Votes	%	Seats	+/−	EP Group
2024	Stanislav Pochman	4,561	0.15 (#22)	0 / 21	New	−

== See also ==
- Conservative Party
