= SEN 21 =

Czech political movement

- Leader: Václav Láska
- Founder: Václav Láska
- Founded: 19 December 2017
- Split from: Green Party
- Youth wing: Young Dreamers
- Ideology: Liberalism; Pro-Europeanism
- Political position: Syncretic
- European affiliation: European Democratic Party
- Colours: Blue and red (SEN 21); Teal and maroon (Senator 21)
- Chamber of Deputies: 0 / 200
- Senate: 3 / 81
- European Parliament: 0 / 21

Website
- senprocesko.cz

SEN 21, formerly Senator 21 (Czech: Senátor 21), is a Czech political movement established in 2017 by Senator Václav Láska after leaving the Green Party. The party's candidate Tomáš Goláň won the 2018 Zlín by-election.

The party joined the European Democratic Party in February 2019.

In October 2023 Senator 21 and Volt Czechia announced that they would be standing in the 2024 European elections with a joint list.

== Election results ==
Former party logo

=== Senate ===
Year	First round			Second round			Seat totals		
Year	Votes	%	Seats	Votes	%	Seats	Won	Not up	Total
2018 (Zlín)	3,234	18.99	0 / 1	5,991	53.78	1 / 1	1 / 1	4 / 80	5 / 81
2018	33,860	3.11	0 / 27	24,250	5.80	1 / 27	1 / 27	5 / 54	6 / 81
2020 (Teplice)	3,475	22.15	0 / 1	3,972	42.83	0 / 1	0 / 1	6 / 80	6 / 81
2020	32,884	3.30	0 / 27	25,071	5.55	2 / 27	2 / 27	1 / 54	3 / 81
2022	27,672	2.49	0 / 27	21,051	4.39	1 / 27	1 / 27	3 / 54	4 / 81
2024	13,068	1.65	0 / 27	6,862	1.76	1 / 27	1 / 27	3 / 54	4 / 81
2026	21,379	1.85	0 / 27	12,205	2.58	1 / 27	1 / 27	2 / 54	3 / 81

=== Local elections ===
Election	Votes	%	Seats	+/–
2026	691,248	0.62	29 / 62,178	

=== European Parliament ===
Election	List leader	Votes	%	Seats	+/−	EP Group
2024 (Note: Run as part of the SEN 21 and Volt coalition.)	Lenka Helena Koenigsmark	9,955	0.34 (#15)	0 / 21	New	−
