= Bloc Against Islamization =

Political party in the Czech Republic

Bloc Against Islamization – Defence of the Homeland Blok proti islamizaci – Obrana domova
- Abbreviation: BPI
- Founder: Eva Morávková
- Founded: 6 May 2003; 22 years ago
- Dissolved: December 12, 2023; 2 years ago
- Headquarters: Znojemská 2380/82, Jihlava
- Ideology: Anti-Islam; Nationalism; Euroscepticism
- Political position: Far-right
- Colours: White Red Blue

Website
- blokprotiislamizaci.cz (archived)

Bloc Against Islamization – Defence of the Homeland (previously known as the Free Citizens (Czech: Svobodní), (Note: Not to be confused with the party of the same name, founded in 2009) Party for Dignified Life (Czech: SDŽ – Strana Důstojného Života) and Home (Czech: DOMOV) (Note: Not to be confused with the party of the same name, founded in 2019) was an anti-Islam political party in the Czech Republic founded in 2003 by Eva Morávková who became the party's first chairwoman.

In 2007, a former Czech Social Democratic Party MP Jana Volfová became party chair and the party was renamed to the Party for Dignified Life. Vice chairs were Eva Morávková, Daniel Bernard, Marie Paukejová, Marcela Kozerová, Miroslav Neubert, and Vladimír Pelc. Former Prime Minister Miloš Zeman was nomited party's patron.

In 2014, the party was renamed to DOMOV (coming from Democracy – Responsibility – Morality – Courage – Patriotism (Czech: Demokracie – Odpovědnost – Morálka – Odvaha – Vlastenectví), meaning Home). David Štěpán became the party chair after Jana Volfová became chair of Sovereignty – Jana Bobošíková Bloc.

In 2016, the party was renamed to Bloc Against Islamization – Defence of the Homeland. It was dissolved in December 2023.

== Election results ==
=== Chamber of Deputies ===
Year	Leader	Votes		Seats			Position
Year	Leader	No.	%	No.	±	Size	Position
2010	Jana Bobošíková	192,145	3.67	0 / 200	0	8th	No seats
2010	Ran on Sovereignty – Party of Common Sense list, which won 0 seats in total						
2017	Jana Borkovcová	5,077	0.10	0 / 200	0	20th	No seats
