= SNK European Democrats =

SNK European Democrats SNK Evropští demokraté
- Leader: Zdeňka Marková
- Founded: 2006
- Merger of: SNK Association of Independents; European Democrats
- Headquarters: Malá Štěpánská 7, Prague
- Ideology: Liberal conservatism Pro-Europeanism
- Political position: Centre to centre-right
- European Parliament group: EPP-ED (2004–2009)
- Colours: Blue, Yellow
- Chamber of Deputies: 0 / 200
- Senate: 0 / 81
- European Parliament: 0 / 21
- Regional councils: 8 / 675
- Governors of the regions: 0 / 13
- Regional coalitions: 2 / 13

Website
- www.snked.cz

The SNK European Democrats (Czech: SNK Evropští demokraté) is a political party in the Czech Republic, led by Zdeňka Marková. The first regular chairperson of this party was Jana Hybášková. The party was created in January 2006 by the merger of two Czech non-parliamentary political parties – SNK Association of Independents (Czech: SNK sdružení nezávislých), led by the former Foreign Minister Josef Zieleniec, and the European Democrats (Czech: Evropští demokraté), led by Jan Kasl, the former Mayor of Prague.

== European Democrats ==
The European Democrats were founded by Kasl, who resigned from his post as Mayor of Prague in protest at the policies of the Civic Democratic Party (ODS), Prague's municipal government. In the 2002 Prague municipal election, the ED won 15 seats, finishing in second place and becoming the main opposition party. In the 2004 Czech regional elections, the party won three seats running by itself in the Karlovy Vary Region, two in coalition with STAN in the Zlín Region, and one on a joint list with SNK in the Central Bohemian Region. In Senate elections the same year, they won one seat out of 27, in the Karlovy Vary district. Kasl remained the party's chairman until the party merged with SNK Association of Independents in 2006.

== SNK Association of Independents ==
The Association of Independent Candidates (Czech: Sdružení nezávislých kandidátů) was registered as a 'movement' (hnutí) by the Czech Ministry of the Interior in August 2000. It was established as a formal electoral body of independent mayors for the regional council elections, as independent candidates and their associations were not legally permitted to participate in the elections. Milan Marko became the first chairman of the association. In the regional elections in 2000, SNK filed candidates in three regions (Budějovice, Jihlava and Ostrava), and won seats in all of them, a total of 16 seats.

In 2002, SNK renamed itself the Association of Independents (Czech: Sdružení nezávislých), and ran under this name as a liberal-conservative party in the 2002 general election, finishing 5th with 2.78%. In the 2002 Senate elections, the movement nominated 13 candidates, two of whom were elected: Václava Domšová (District No. 48 - Rychnov nad Kněžnou) and Josef Novotný (District No. 51 - Žďár nad Sázavou). In the simultaneous municipal elections, the association won 5.31% of the votes across the country, and 5.01% of the seats.

In March 2003, Igor Petrov was elected as the new party chair at a national congress. The Association of Independents also approved another change of name, to the SNK Association of Independents (Czech: SNK Sdružení nezávislých kandidátů).

== Cooperation and merger ==
In the 2004 European Parliament election, the European Democrats and SNK Association of Independents stood on a joint ticket, winning 11.02% of the vote with three MEPs elected: two members of SNK (Josef Zieleniec and Tomáš Zatloukal) and one European Democrat (Jana Hybášková).

Merger negotiations began immediately after the positive results in the 2004 elections, and in February 2006 the two parties merged to become SNK European Democrats (SNK ED), a pro-European, liberal-conservative party. The extended delay to the merger was because, according to Czech law, "if two parties unite to form a new party then they would lose their right to the money for their mandates" (950 000 CZK per senator per year and around 12 000 000 CZK for all their seats in Prague's municipal government), funds which were crucial for the forthcoming parliament elections. Instead of appointing a chairman, the unified party was led by former Foreign Minister Josef Zieleniec as the "political leader" and Kasl as Executive Vice Chairman. European Democrat members who did not join the new party later renamed the rump party as United Democrats - Association of Independents.

There were subsequently tensions between former SNK and ED members and a dispute over funding, when Social Democrat Finance Minister Bohuslav Sobotka refused to pay out the money for ED's seats in Prague's municipal government (around 15 000 000 CZK), despite declarations from the Czech Ombudsman, and the Supreme Administrative and Constitutional Court that ED had the right to these funds. In the 2006 general election, the SNK European Democrats received 2.1% of the vote and failed to have any representatives elected.

Jana Hybášková, elected as an MEP, became the party's first regular chair.

== Election results ==
- 2002 Chamber of Deputies: SNK – 2.78% – no seats
- 2002 Senate: SNK – 2 seats, ED – no seats
- 2002 Prague's municipal government: SNK – no seats, ED – 15 seats
- 2004 Senate: SNK – 1 seat, ED – 1 seat
- 2004 European Parliament: SNK and ED in coalition – 11.02% – 3 seats
- 2006 Chamber of Deputies: 2.1% – no seats
- 2006 Senate: no seats
- 2008 Senate: no seats

== See also ==
- Liberal conservatism
- List of political parties in the Czech Republic
