= 2008 Czech Senate election =

Senate elections were held in the Czech Republic on 17 and 18 October 2008, with a second round on 24 and 25 October 2008, electing one-third of the members of the Senate. A total of 200 candidates contested the 27 seats, and more than two-thirds of the incumbents ran for another term – only seven retired.

Governing parties (ODS and KDU-CSL; the Greens had no open seats) suffered massive losses – only 3 candidates (all ODS) were elected. The Opposition Czech Social Democratic Party won the election with 23 out of the 27 seats contested. The Civic Democratic Party lost its majority in the Senate (which was used to delay ratification of the Lisbon Treaty in the Czech Republic).

== Results ==
Nominating party	First round			Second round			Seats		
Nominating party	Votes	%	Seats	Votes	%	Seats	Won	Not up	Total
Czech Social Democratic Party	347,759	33.20	1	459,829	55.92	22	23	6	29
Civic Democratic Party	252,827	24.14	0	266,731	32.44	3	3	32	35
Communist Party of Bohemia and Moravia	147,186	14.05	0	20,900	2.54	1	1	2	3
KDU-ČSL	83,674	7.99	0	42,225	5.13	0	0	7	7
Green Party	41,836	3.99	0				0	1	1
SNK European Democrats	39,995	3.82	0	24,974	3.04	0	0	2	2
Party for the Open Society	14,848	1.42	0				0	1	1
Freedom Union – Democratic Union	12,016	1.15	0				0	1	1
Bloc Against Islamisation – Home Defence	10,545	1.01	0				0	0	0
Independent Democrats	10,519	1.00	0				0	0	0
Liberal Reform Party	9,063	0.87	0				0	0	0
Public Affairs	8,634	0.82	0				0	0	0
Independent Mayors for the Region	7,881	0.75	0				0	1	1
HNHRM	7,542	0.72	0				0	0	0
Independents	6,108	0.58	0				0	0	0
Non-Partisans	5,270	0.50	0				0	0	0
Club of Committed Non-Party Members	4,896	0.47	0				0	0	0
Severočeši.cz	4,557	0.44	0				0	0	0
Party of Common Sense	3,607	0.34	0				0	0	0
Czech National Socialist Party	3,289	0.31	0				0	0	0
Fair Play – HNPD	1,866	0.18	0				0	0	0
Right Bloc	1,832	0.17	0				0	0	0
National Democracy	1,328	0.13	0				0	0	0
Workers' Party	1,095	0.10	0				0	0	0
Mayors and Personalities for Moravia	973	0.09	0				0	0	0
Civic Self-Defence Party	934	0.09	0				0	0	0
Koruna Česká	917	0.09	0				0	0	0
Head Up – Electoral Bloc	885	0.08	0				0	0	0
Independents	15,476	1.48	0	7,694	0.94	0	0	1	1
Total	1,047,358	100.00	1	822,353	100.00	26	27	54	81
Valid votes	1,047,358	93.86		822,353	99.74				
Invalid/blank votes	68,510	6.14		2,137	0.26				
Total votes	1,115,868	100.00		824,490	100.00				
Registered voters/turnout	2,852,506	39.12		2,764,218	29.83				
Source: Volby, IPU
