= 2002 Czech Senate election =

- 25–26 October 2002 (first round); 1–2 November 2002 (second round)
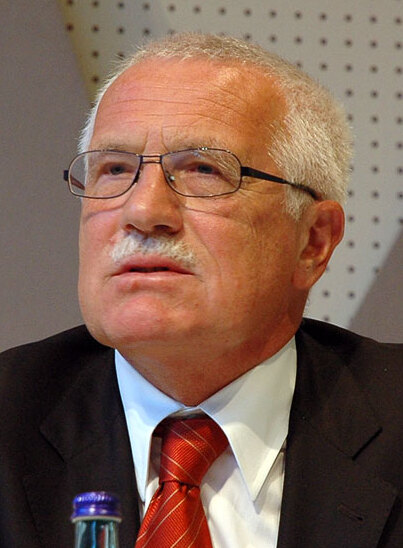

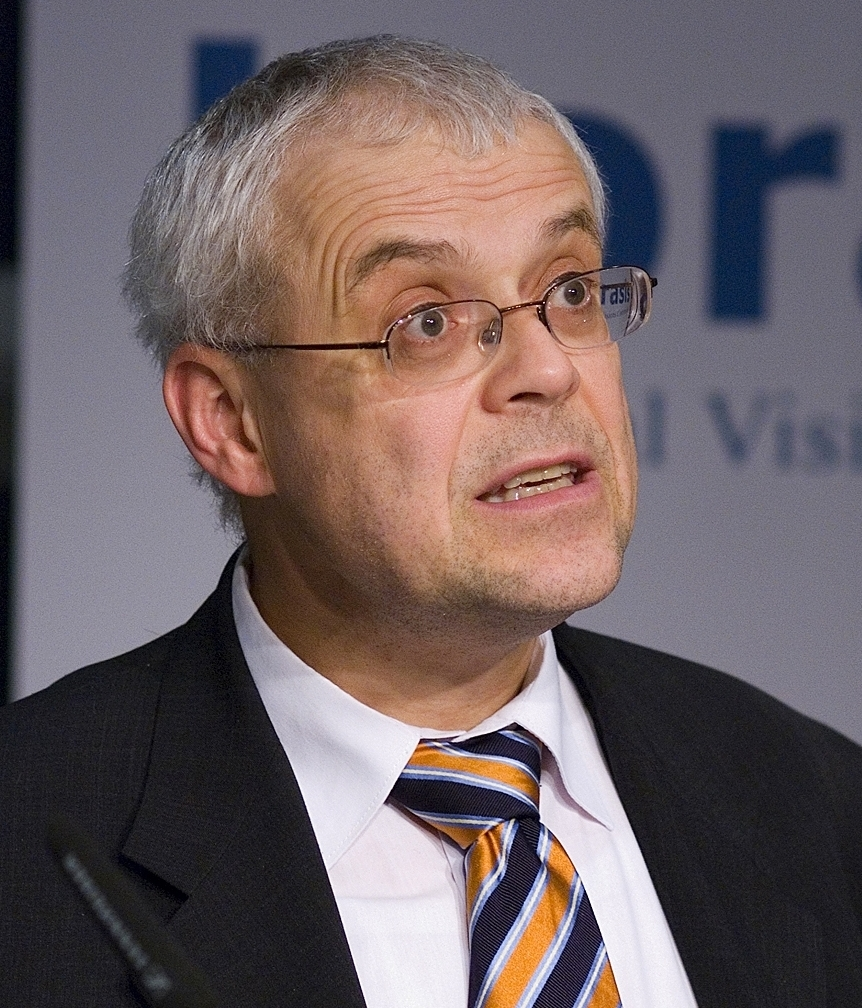

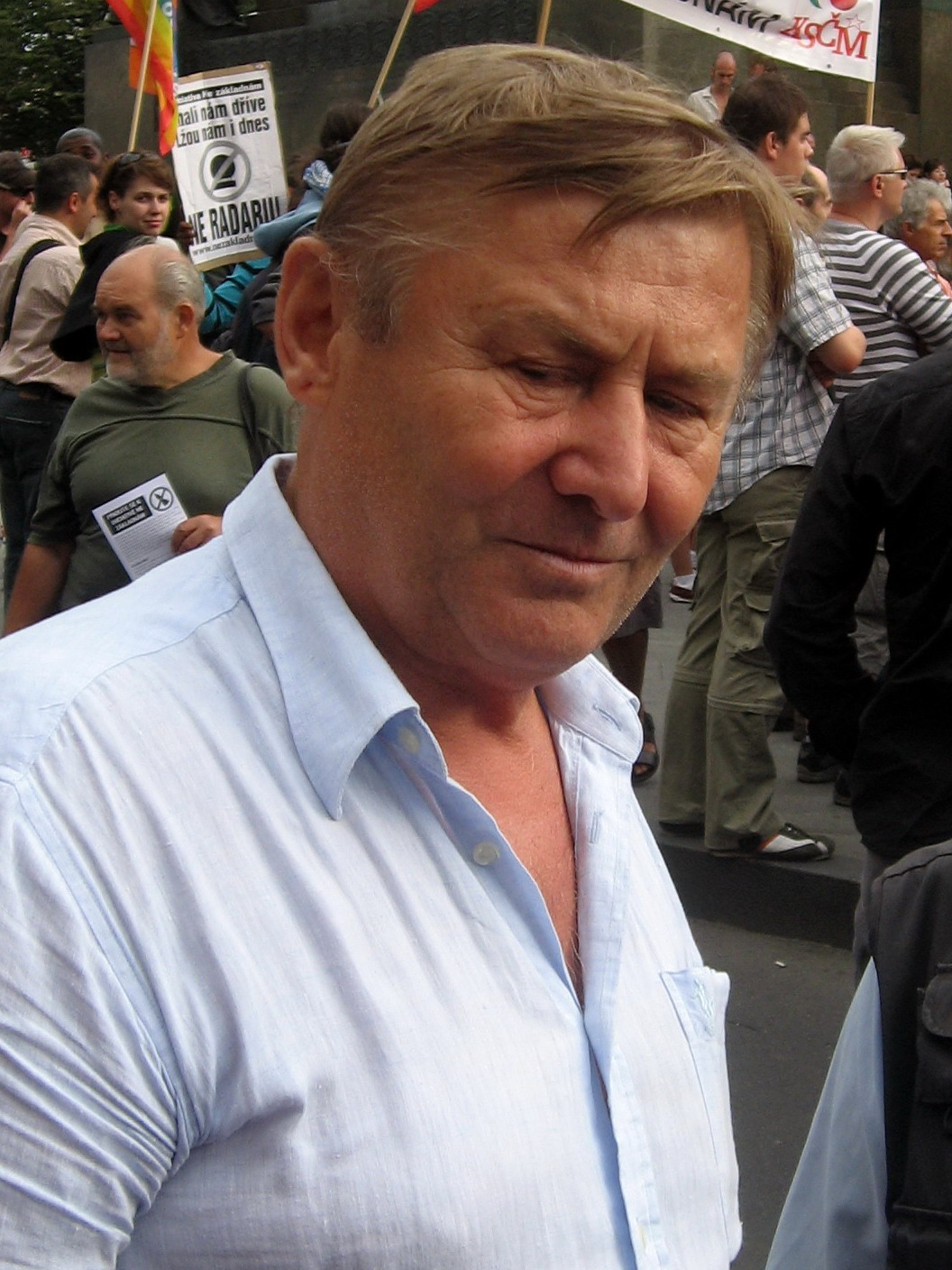

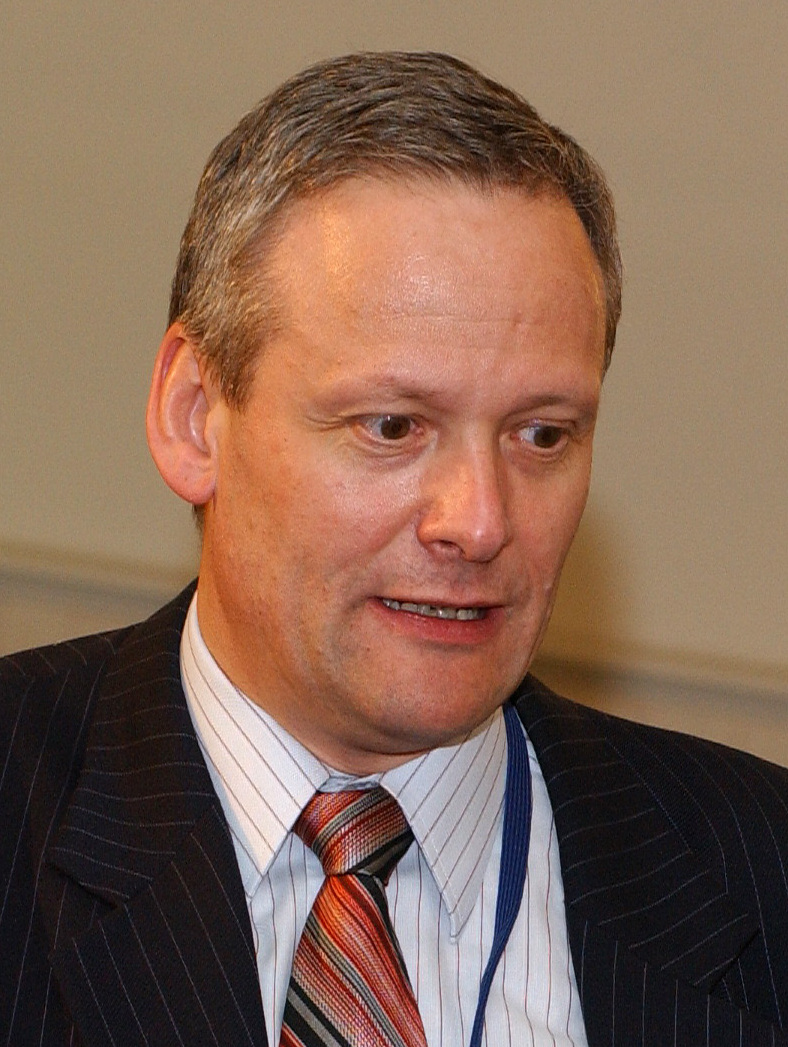
	First party	Second party
Leader	Václav Klaus	Vladimír Špidla
Party	ODS	ČSSD
Seats won	9	7
First round	165,794; 24.9%	122,397; 18.4%
Second round	284,537; 34.6%	224,386; 27.3%
	Third party	Fourth party
Leader	Miroslav Grebeníček	Cyril Svoboda
Party	KSČM	Christian and Democratic Union – Czechoslovak People's Party
Seats won	1	1
First round	110,171; 16.5%	58,858; 8.8%
Second round	57,434; 7.0%	47,049; 5.7%

Senate elections were held in the Czech Republic on 25 and 26 October 2002, with a second round on 1 and 2 November. Voter turnout was just 24.1% in the first round and 31.7% in the second.

The results saw the Civic Democratic Party emerge as the most successful party, winning nine seats. Independent candidates were also successful, winning eight seats. The parties of the former Four-Coalition were heavily defeated.

== Electoral system ==
One third of the 81-member Senate is elected every two years, giving Senators six year terms. The seats are elected in single-member constituencies using the two-round system.

== Background ==
Czech Social Democratic Party held 11 Seats in the elected part of Senate. Christian and Democratic Union – Czechoslovak People's Party held second highest number of seats - 6. Both parties were part of governing coalition. Opposition Civic Democratic Party held only 5 Seats. Election was considered important due to 2003 Presidential election. Czech Social Democratic Party was considered front-runner of the election while the Civic Democratic Party was expected to be second strongest party.

=== Composition of contested seats prior to the elections ===
Name	Ideology	Leader	Seats
Czech Social Democratic Party	Social democracy	Vladimír Špidla	11 / 27
KDU-ČSL	Christian democracy	Cyril Svoboda	6 / 27
Civic Democratic Party	Conservatism	Václav Klaus	5 / 27
Civic Democratic Alliance	Liberalism	Jiřina Nováková	3 / 27
Communist Party of Bohemia and Moravia	Communism	Miroslav Grebeníček	1 / 27
Independents			1 / 27

== Opinion polls ==
Date	Polling firm	ČSSD	KDU-ČSL	ODS	ODA	KSČM	US–DEU
2 November 2002	Result	7	1	9	0	1	1
7 October 2002	SC&C	12	4	4	0	1	1
November 1996	Previous election	11	6	5	3	1	0

== Results ==
Nominating party	First round			Second round			Total seats
Nominating party	Votes	%	Seats	Votes	%	Seats	Total seats
Civic Democratic Party	165,794	24.88	0	284,537	34.60	9	9
Czech Social Democratic Party	122,397	18.37	0	224,386	27.29	7	7
Communist Party of Bohemia and Moravia	110,171	16.53	0	57,434	6.98	1	1
KDU-ČSL	58,858	8.83	0	47,049	5.72	1	1
Freedom Union – Democratic Union	48,879	7.33	0	36,294	4.41	1	1
SNK Union of Independents	44,112	6.62	0	45,096	5.48	2	2
Independents	27,533	4.13	1	23,812	2.90	1	2
Civic Democratic Alliance	8,846	1.33	0				0
Liberal Reform Party	7,592	1.14	0	20,069	2.44	1	1
Vote for the City	7,242	1.09	0	12,587	1.53	0	0
Path of Change	4,967	0.75	0	18,087	2.20	1	1
HNHRM	4,576	0.69	0	16,915	2.06	1	1
Your Vote	3,177	0.48	0				0
Right Bloc	3,044	0.46	0				0
Hope	2,858	0.43	0				0
Green Party	2,639	0.40	0				0
Party for the Open Society	2,576	0.39	0				0
United Democrats – Association of Independents	2,165	0.32	0				0
Active Independent Citizens	1,734	0.26	0				0
Balbín's Poetic Party	1,455	0.22	0				0
Rural Party – United Civic Forces	1,240	0.19	0				0
Moravané	1,181	0.18	0				0
Civic Coalition – Political Club	1,043	0.16	0				0
Moravian Democratic Party	532	0.08	0				0
Choice for the Future	496	0.07	0				0
Party of Common Sense	489	0.07	0				0
Conservative Party	480	0.07	0				0
Party for Life Security	352	0.05	0				0
Czech National Social Party	187	0.03	0				0
Democratic League	64	0.01	0				0
Independents	29,776	4.47	0	36,021	4.38	1	1
Total	666,455	100.00	1	822,287	100.00	26	27
Valid votes	666,455	98.91		822,287	95.89		
Invalid/blank votes	7,366	1.09		35,204	4.11		
Total votes	673,821	100.00		857,491	100.00		
Registered voters/turnout	2,797,846	24.08		2,708,764	31.66		
Source: Nohlen & Stöver, Volby
