= Green Party leadership election =

Green Party leadership election may refer to:

- 1995 Green Party of Aotearoa New Zealand co-leadership elections
- 2001 Green Party of Ontario leadership election
- 2005 Green Party (Czech Republic) leadership election
- 2006 Green Party of Aotearoa New Zealand male co-leadership election
- 2006 Green Party of Canada leadership election
- 2007 Green Party (Czech Republic) leadership election
- 2008 Green Party leadership election (disambiguation), any of several Green Party leadership elections in 2008
- 2009 Green Party of Aotearoa New Zealand female co-leadership election
- 2009 Green Party (Czech Republic) leadership election
- 2009 Green Party of Ontario leadership election
- 2010 Green Party (Czech Republic) leadership election
- 2010 Green Party of England and Wales leadership election
- 2012 Green Party leadership election (disambiguation), any of several Green Party leadership elections in 2012
- 2013 Green Party of Quebec leadership election
- 2014 Green Party (Czech Republic) leadership election
- 2014 Green Party of England and Wales leadership election
- 2015 Green Party of Aotearoa New Zealand male co-leadership election
- 2015 Green Party (Czech Republic) leadership election
- 2016 Green Party leadership election (disambiguation), any of several Green Party leadership elections in 2016
- 2017 Green League leadership election in Finland
- 2018 Green Party leadership election (disambiguation), any of several Green Party leadership elections in 2018
- 2019 Scottish Greens co-leadership election
- 2020 Green Party leadership election (disambiguation), any of several Green Party leadership elections in 2020
- 2021 Green Party of Aotearoa New Zealand male co-leadership election
- 2021 Green Party of England and Wales leadership election
- 2022 Green Party leadership election (disambiguation), any of several Green Party elections taking place in 2022
- 2024 Green Party of Aotearoa New Zealand co-leadership election
- 2025 Green Party of England and Wales leadership election
