= Second cabinet of Mirek Topolánek =

Mirek Topolánek's Second Cabinet
- 9th Cabinet of Czech Republic
- 9 January 2007 - 8 May 2009
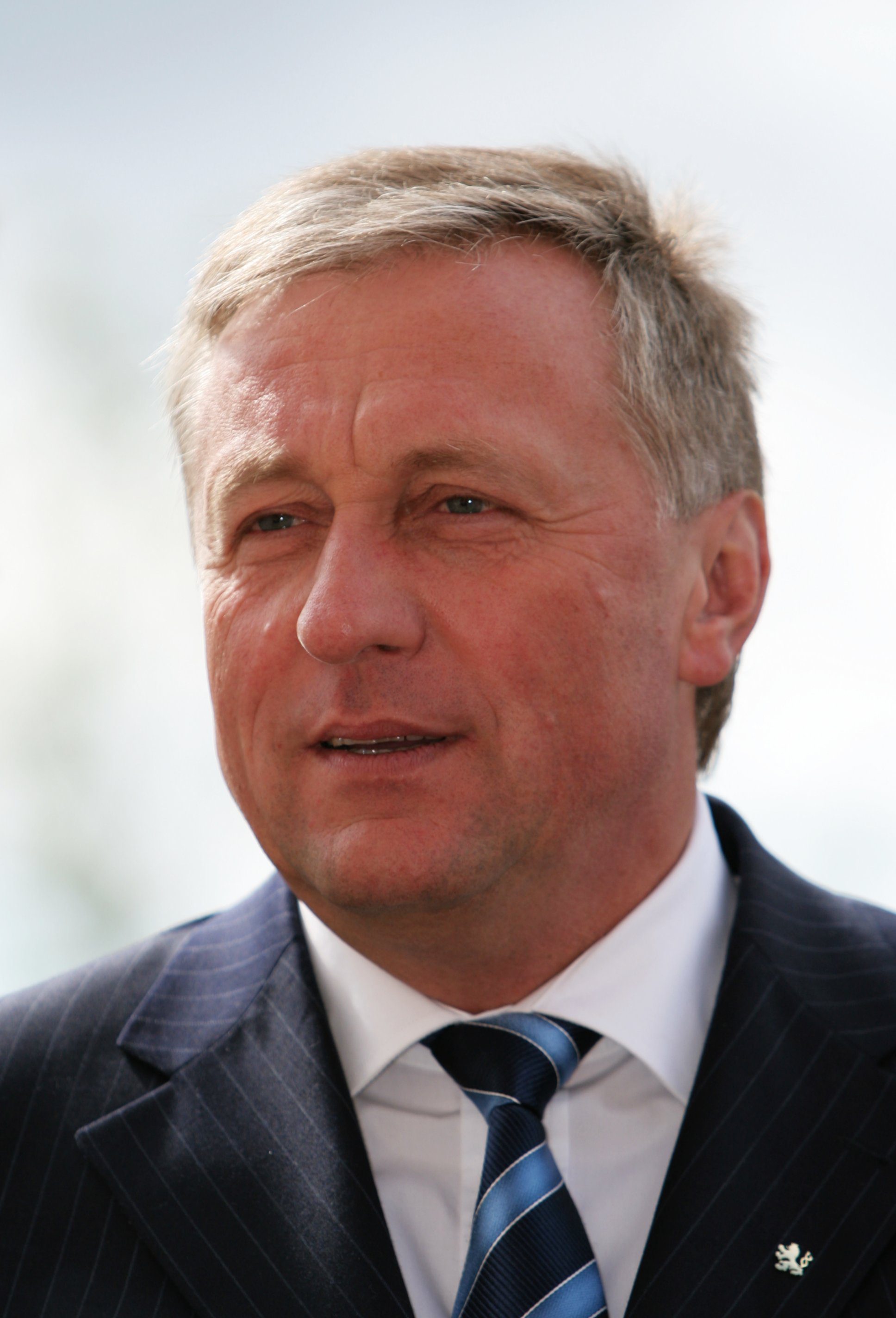
- Date formed: 9 January 2007
- Date dissolved: 8 May 2009

People and organisations
- Head of state: Václav Klaus
- Head of government: Mirek Topolánek
- No. of ministers: 18
- Member party: ODS; KDU-ČSL; SZ
- Status in legislature: Minority (Coalition)
- Opposition party: ČSSD; KSČM
- Opposition leader: Jiří Paroubek

History
- Election: 2006 Czech legislative election
- Incoming formation: 2007
- Outgoing formation: 2009
- Predecessor: Topolánek I
- Successor: Fischer

The Government of the Czech Republic since January 9, 2007 was formed by a coalition of the victorious Civic Democratic Party (ODS, 9 seats) with the small Christian and Democratic Union - Czechoslovak People's Party (KDU-ČSL, 5 seats) and the Green Party (SZ, 4 seats). It had 18 members; initially four of the appointed ministers were women but two subsequently resigned and were replaced with men. On 24 March 2009, during the Czech presidency of the European Union, Topolánek's second cabinet suffered defeat in a parliamentary vote of no confidence, 101–96, in the 200-seat lower house. Prime minister Topolánek stated that he would resign. It happened in May, 2009.

== Members of the Cabinet ==
Portfolio	Minister	Political party	In Office
Prime Minister	Mirek Topolánek	ODS	9 January 2007 – 8 May 2009
Deputy Prime Minister; Minister for European Affairs	Alexandr Vondra	ODS	9 January 2007 – 8 May 2009
Deputy Prime Minister; Minister of Labour and Social Affairs	Petr Nečas	ODS	9 January 2007 – 8 May 2009
First Deputy Prime minister	Vlasta Parkanová	KDU-ČSL	23 January 2009 – 8 May 2009
First Deputy Prime minister	Jiří Čunek	KDU-ČSL	9 January 2007 – 13 November 2007
Deputy Prime Minister; Minister of the Environment	Martin Bursík	SZ	9 January 2007 – 8 May 2009
Minister of Interior	Ivan Langer	ODS	9 January 2007 – 8 May 2009
Minister of Industry and Trade	Martin Říman	ODS	9 January 2007 – 8 May 2009
Minister of Justice	Jiří Pospíšil	ODS	9 January 2007 – 8 May 2009
Minister of Transportation	Petr Bendl	ODS	23 January 2009 – 8 May 2009
Minister of Transportation	Aleš Řebíček	ODS	9 January 2007 – 23 January 2009
Minister of Health	Daniela Filipiová	ODS	23 January 2009 – 8 May 2009
Minister of Health	Tomáš Julínek	ODS	9 January 2007 – 23 January 2009
Minister of Agriculture	Petr Gandalovič	ODS	9 January 2007 – 8 May 2009
Minister of Finance	Miroslav Kalousek	KDU-ČSL	9 January 2007 – 8 May 2009
Minister of Culture	Václav Jehlička	KDU-ČSL	26 January 2007 – 8 May 2009
Minister of Culture	Helena Třeštíková	non-partisan for KDU-ČSL	9 January 2007 – 26 January 2007
Minister of Defence	Vlasta Parkanová	KDU-ČSL	9 January 2007 – 8 May 2009
Minister without Portfolio	Pavel Svoboda	KDU-ČSL	23 January 2009 – 8 May 2009
Minister without Portfolio	Cyril Svoboda	KDU-ČSL	9 January 2007 – 23 January 2009
Minister of Foreign Affairs	Karel Schwarzenberg	non-partisan for SZ	9 January 2007 – 8 May 2009
Minister of Education, Youth and Physical training	Ondřej Liška	SZ	4 December 2007 – 8 May 2009
Minister of Education, Youth and Physical training	Dana Kuchtová	SZ	9 January 2007 – 4 October 2007
Minister of Regional development	Cyril Svoboda	KDU-ČSL	23 January 2009 – 8 May 2009
Minister of Regional development	Jiří Čunek	KDU-ČSL	1 April 2008 – 23 January 2009
Minister of Regional development	Jiří Čunek	KDU-ČSL	9 January 2007 – 7 November 2007
Minister without Portfolio (Human rights and minorities)	Michael Kocáb	non-partisan for SZ	23 January 2009 – 8 May 2009
Minister without Portfolio (Human rights and minorities)	Džamila Stehlíková	SZ	9 January 2007 – 23 January 2009

== Vote of No Confidence ==
Czech Republic Government vote of No Confidence
24 March 2009

Results
Choice	Votes	%
Yes	101	51.27%
No	96	48.73%
Valid votes	197	100.00%
Invalid or blank votes	0	0.00%
Total votes	197	100.00%
- 52 signatures are needed for calling a vote of no confidence.

A vote of no confidence in the government was held on 24 March 2009. It was the first time since the dissolution of Czechoslovakia that Czech government had lost a vote of No Confidence. Vote was held during Czech Presidency of the Council of the European Union in 2009.

101 MPs voted for the motion of No Confidence. Some MPs from the governing coalition voted for the motion, including Vlastimil Tlustý, Jan Schwippel, Věra Jakubková and Olga Zubová. cabinet of Jan Fischer was appointed in May 2009.
