= First cabinet of Mirek Topolánek =

Mirek Topolánek's First Cabinet
- 8th Cabinet of Czech Republic
- 4 September 2006 - 9 January 2007
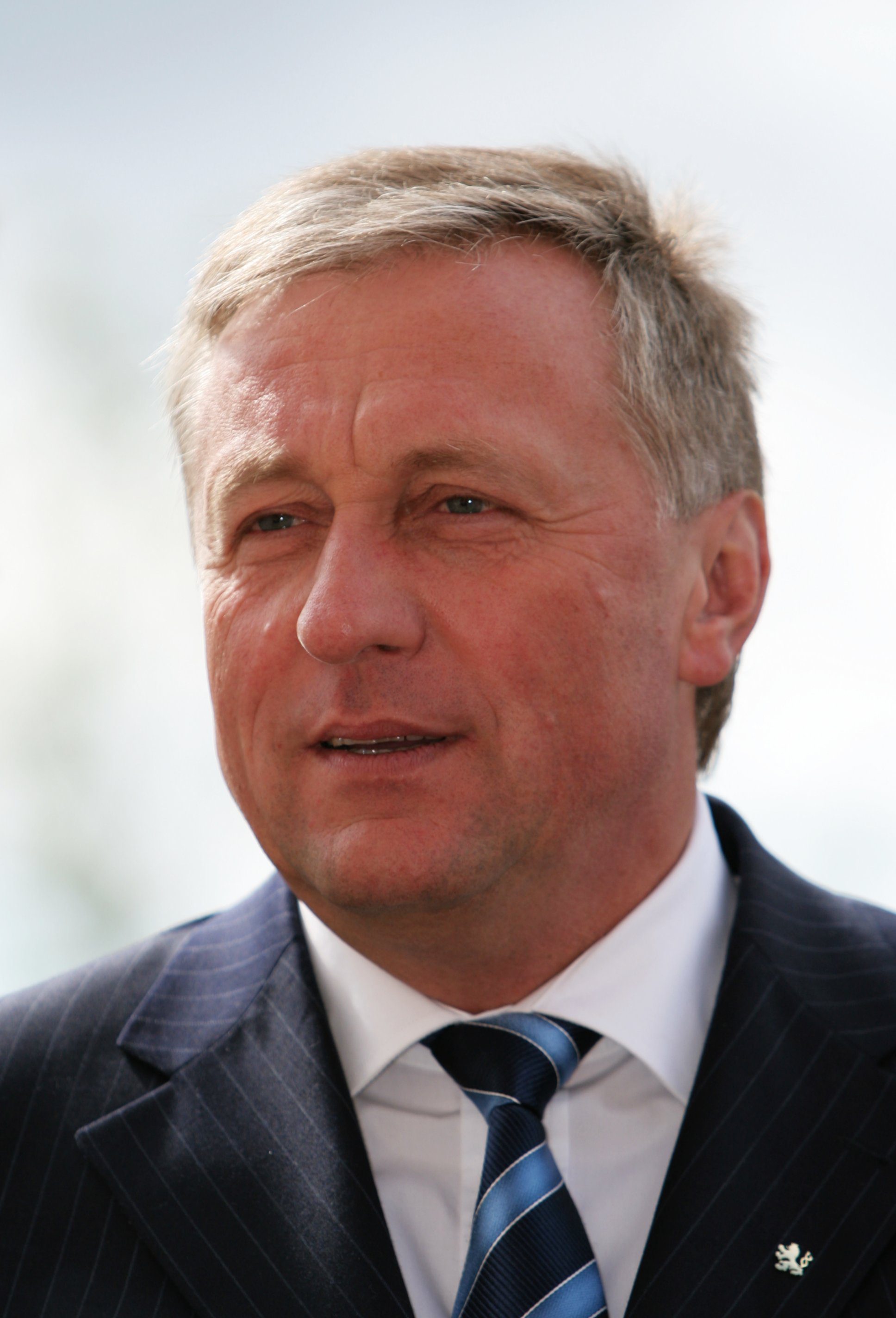
- Date formed: 4 September 2006
- Date dissolved: 9 January 2007

People and organisations
- Head of state: Václav Klaus
- Head of government: Mirek Topolánek
- No. of ministers: 15
- Member party: ODS
- Status in legislature: Minority
- Opposition party: ČSSD; KSČM; KDU-ČSL; SZ
- Opposition leader: Jiří Paroubek

History
- Incoming formation: 2006
- Outgoing formation: 2007
- Election: 2006 Czech legislative election
- Predecessor: Cabinet of Jiří Paroubek
- Successor: Second Cabinet of Mirek Topolánek

Mirek Topolánek's First Cabinet was Cabinet of the Czech Republic from 4 September 2006 to 9 January 2007. The cabinet consisted of members of Civic Democratic Party (ODS) and non-partisans. On 3 October 2006 the cabinet did not pass through Confidence and supply in Chamber of Deputies of the Parliament of the Czech Republic by 96 to 99.

== Government ministers ==
Portfolio	Minister	Political party	In office
Prime Minister	Mirek Topolánek	ODS	16 August 2006 - 9 January 2007
Deputy Prime Minister and Minister of Labour and Social Affairs	Petr Nečas	ODS	4 September 2006 - 9 January 2007
Minister of the Interior and Minister of Informatics	Ivan Langer	ODS	4 September 2006 - 9 January 2007
Minister of Justice and Chairman of the Legislative Council	Jiří Pospíšil	ODS	4 September 2006 - 9 January 2007
Minister of Foreign Affairs	Alexandr Vondra	non-partisan	4 September 2006 - 9 January 2007
Minister of Defence	Jiří Šedivý	non-partisan	4 September 2006 - 9 January 2007
Minister of Finance	Vlastimil Tlustý	ODS	4 September 2006 - 9 January 2007
Minister of Transport	Aleš Řebíček	ODS	4 September 2006 - 9 January 2007
Minister of Industry and Trade	Martin Říman	ODS	4 September 2006 - 9 January 2007
Minister of Agriculture	Milena Vicenová	non-partisan	4 September 2006 - 9 January 2007
Minister of Health	Tomáš Julínek	ODS	4 September 2006 - 9 January 2007
Minister of Education, Youth and Sport	Miroslava Kopicová	non-partisan	4 September 2006 - 9 January 2007
Minister of the Environment	Petr Kalaš	non-partisan	4 September 2006 - 9 January 2007
Minister of Culture	Martin Štěpánek	non-partisan	4 September 2006 - 9 January 2007
Minister for Regional Development	Petr Gandalovič	ODS	4 September 2006 - 9 January 2007
