= Mirek Topolánek's Cabinet =

The Mirek Topolánek's Cabinet may refer to:

- Mirek Topolánek's First Cabinet, 2006–2007
- Mirek Topolánek's Second Cabinet, 2007–2009
