= 2016 Green Party (Czech Republic) leadership election =

- 23 January 2016
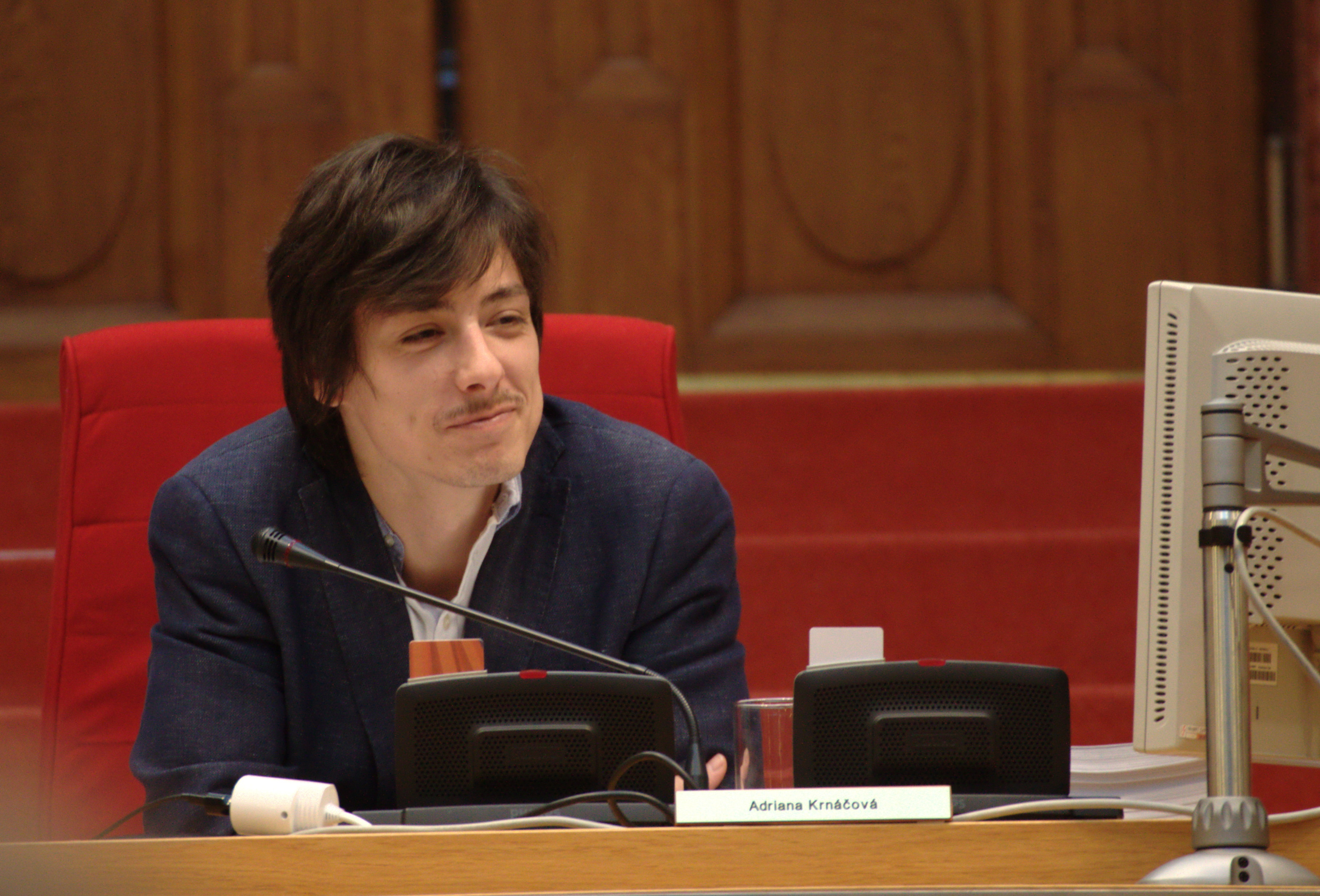

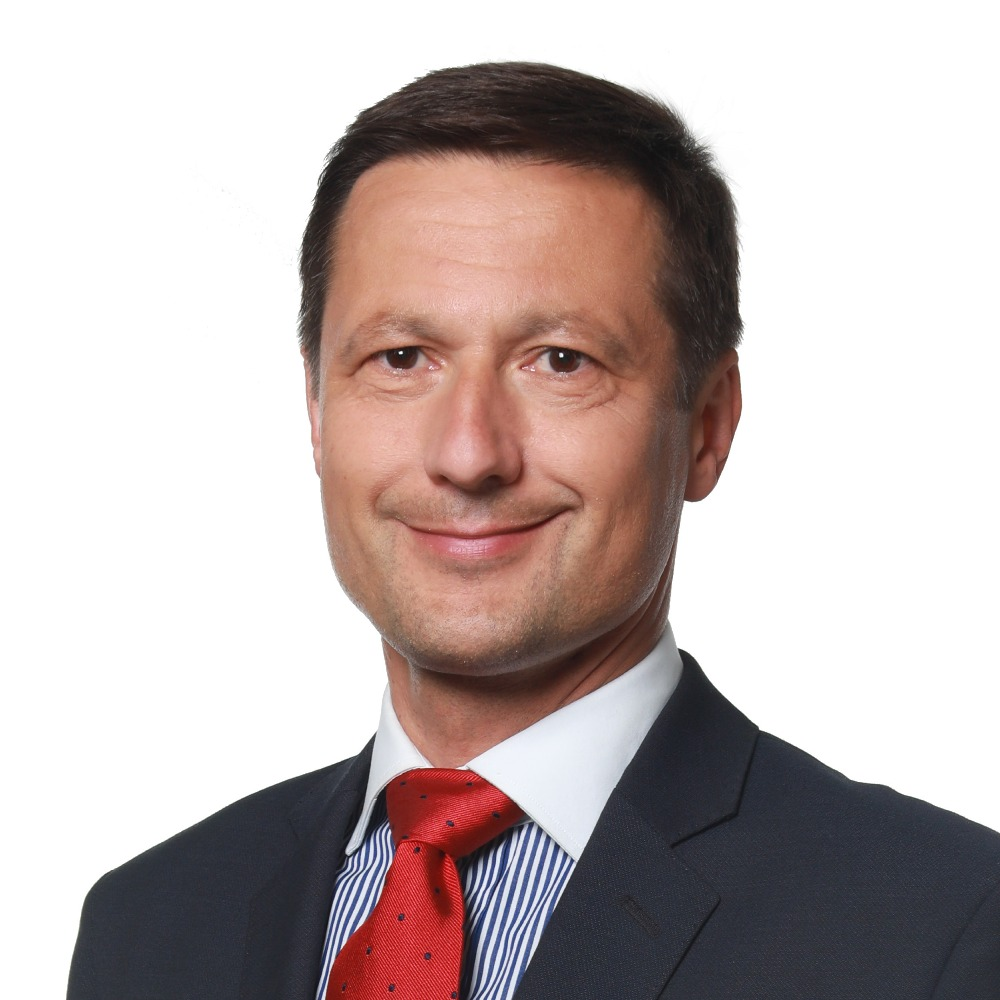

Candidate	Matěj Stropnický	Petr Štěpánek	Jan Šlechta
Electoral vote	117	92	6
Percentage	54.4%	42.8%	2.8%
Leader of Greens before election
Jana Drápalová
Elected Leader of Greens
Matěj Stropnický

The Green Party (SZ) leadership election of 2016 was held on 23 January 2016. Matěj Stropnický was elected new leader of the party. 222 delegates were allowed to vote.

== Candidates ==
- Matěj Stropnický, was considered a Left-wing candidate in the election. He stated that he considers Greens to be a radical party.
- Petr Štěpánek, was Stropnický's main rival. He was considered a Liberal candidate. His politics are close to Martin Bursík.
- Jan Šlechta, was third candidate. He caused an incident because he was drunk during his candidate speech and was forced out of the hall.

== Voting ==
Candidate	Votes	%
Matěj Stropnický	117	54.42%
Petr Štěpánek	92	42.79%
Jan Šlechta	6	2.79%
