= 2012 Green Party (Czech Republic) leadership election =

- 24 November 2012
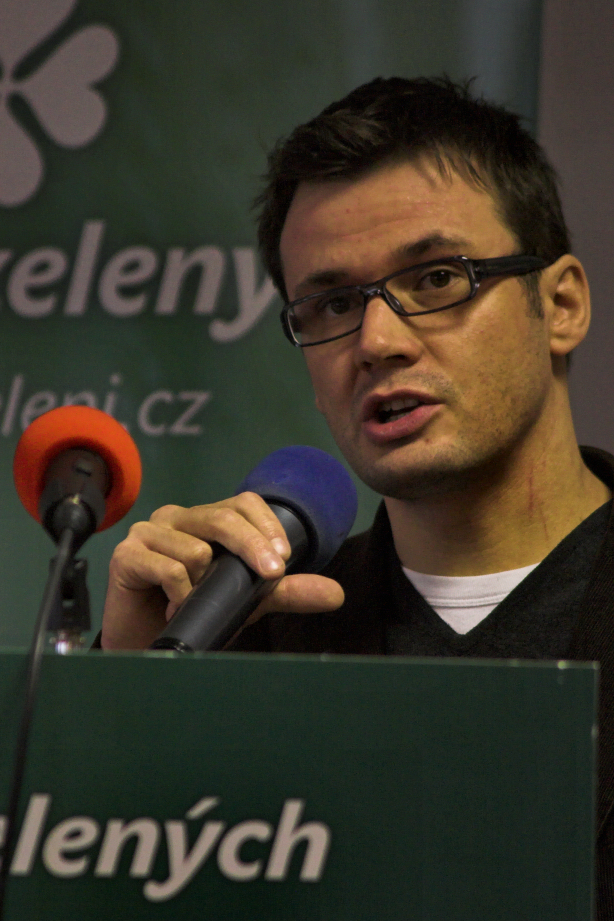

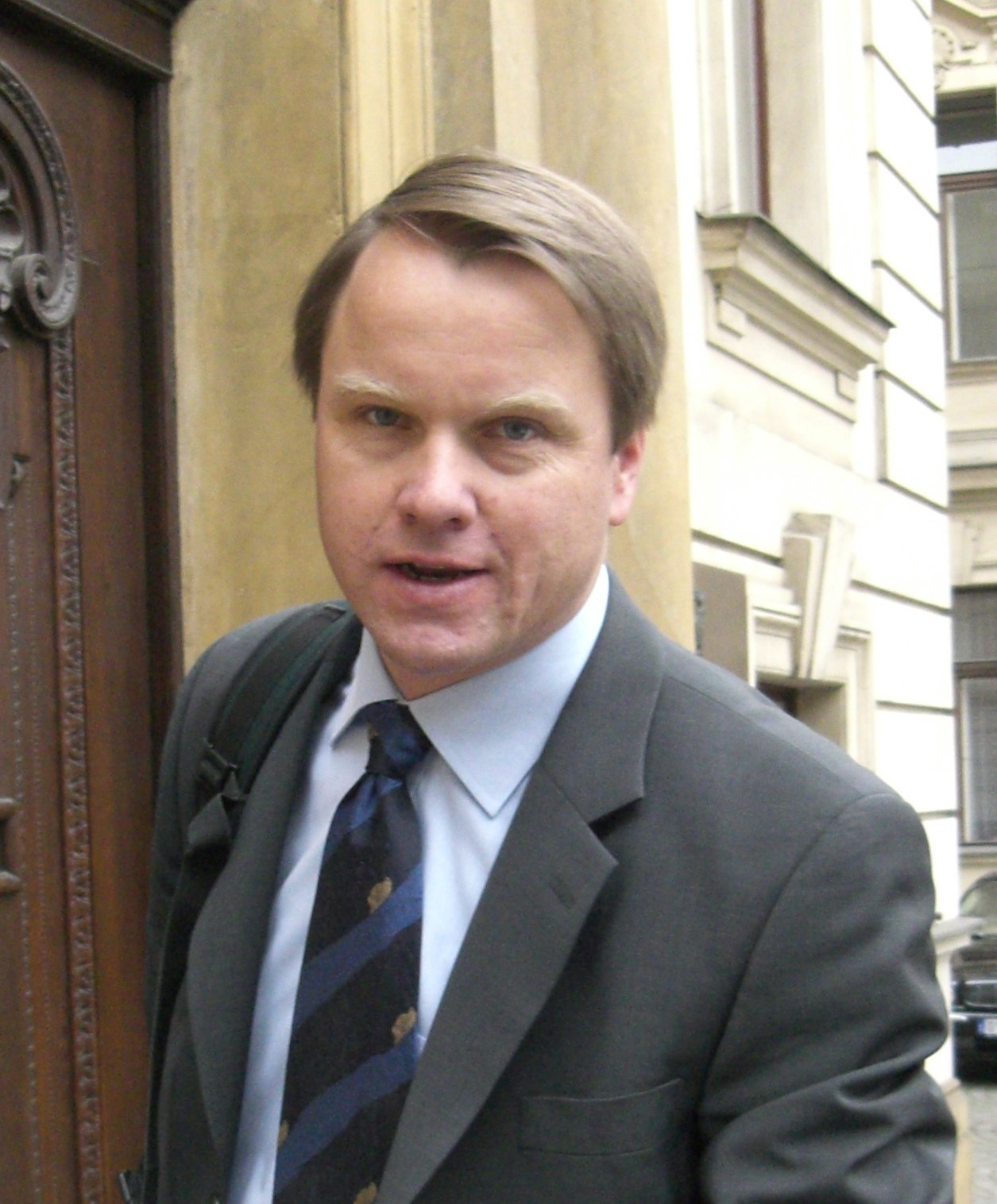
Candidate	Ondřej Liška	Martin Bursík
Electoral vote	106	70
Percentage	56%	37%
Leader of Greens before election
Ondřej Liška
Elected Leader of Greens
Ondřej Liška

The Green Party (SZ) leadership election of 2012 was held on 24 November 2012. Incumbent Ondřej Liška saw competition from former Party Leader Martin Bursík. Liška defeated Bursík and remained the Leader.

== Background ==
Ondřej Liška has been the leader of the Green Party since 2009 when Martin Bursík resigned. On 12 May 2012 Bursík announced his intention to run for the position of Party Leader as he believes that Greens move too much to Left. He stated that he wants Green Party to be a Centrist liberal environmental party. Liška decide to run for another term and face Bursík. Jiří Koreš and Eva Kodymová decided to also run as "protest" Candidates.

== Voting ==
Voting took place on 24 November 2012. Election was seen as a duel between Liška and Bursík. Other Candidates included Jiří Koreš and Eva Kodymová. Liška won the election with 110 votes against Bursík's 70 votes.

Candidate	Votes	
Ondřej Liška	106	56.08%
Martin Bursík	70	37.04%
Jiří Koreš	7	3.70%
Eva Kodymová	6	3.17%
