= 2008 Green Party (Czech Republic) leadership election =

- 9 September 2008
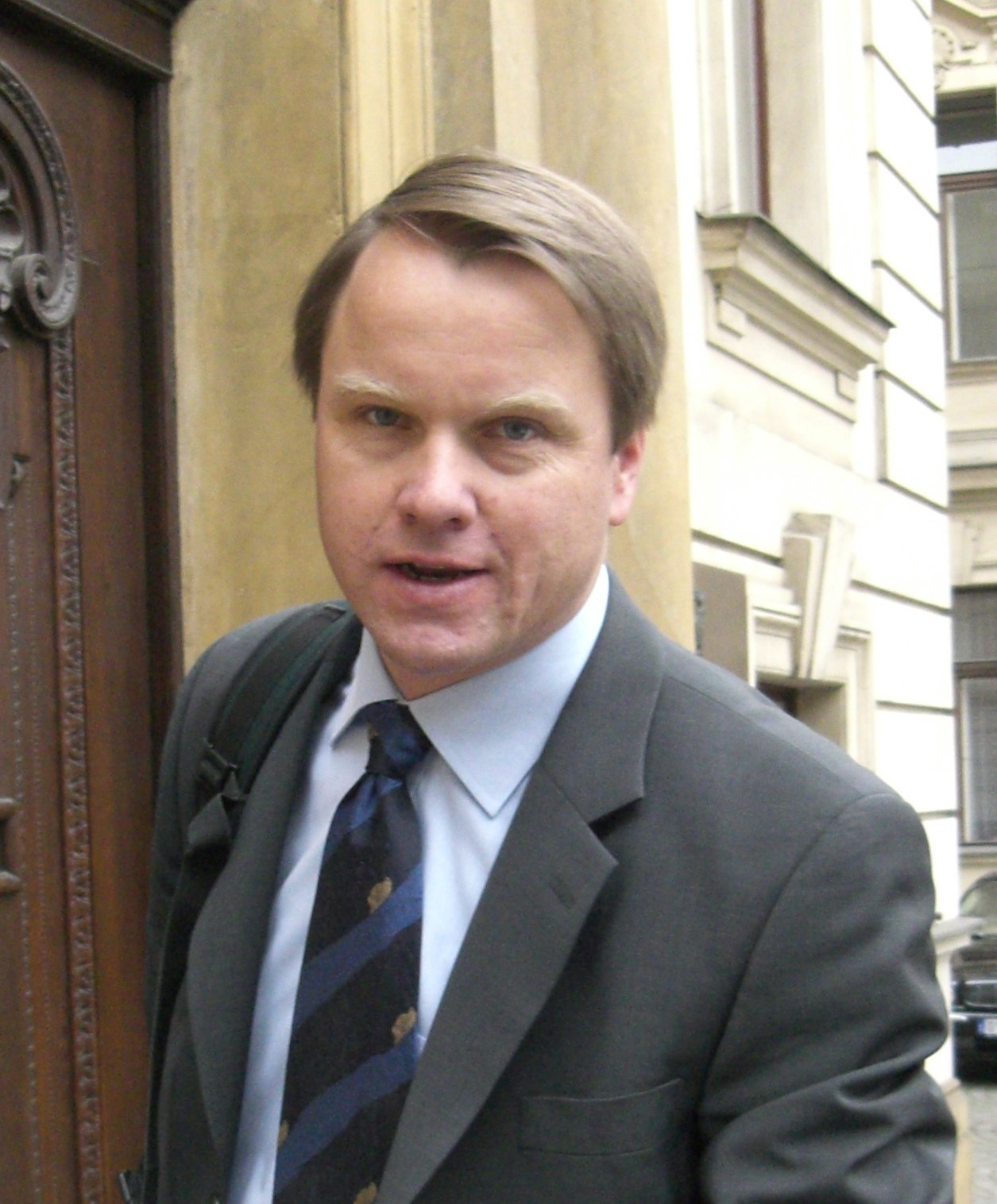

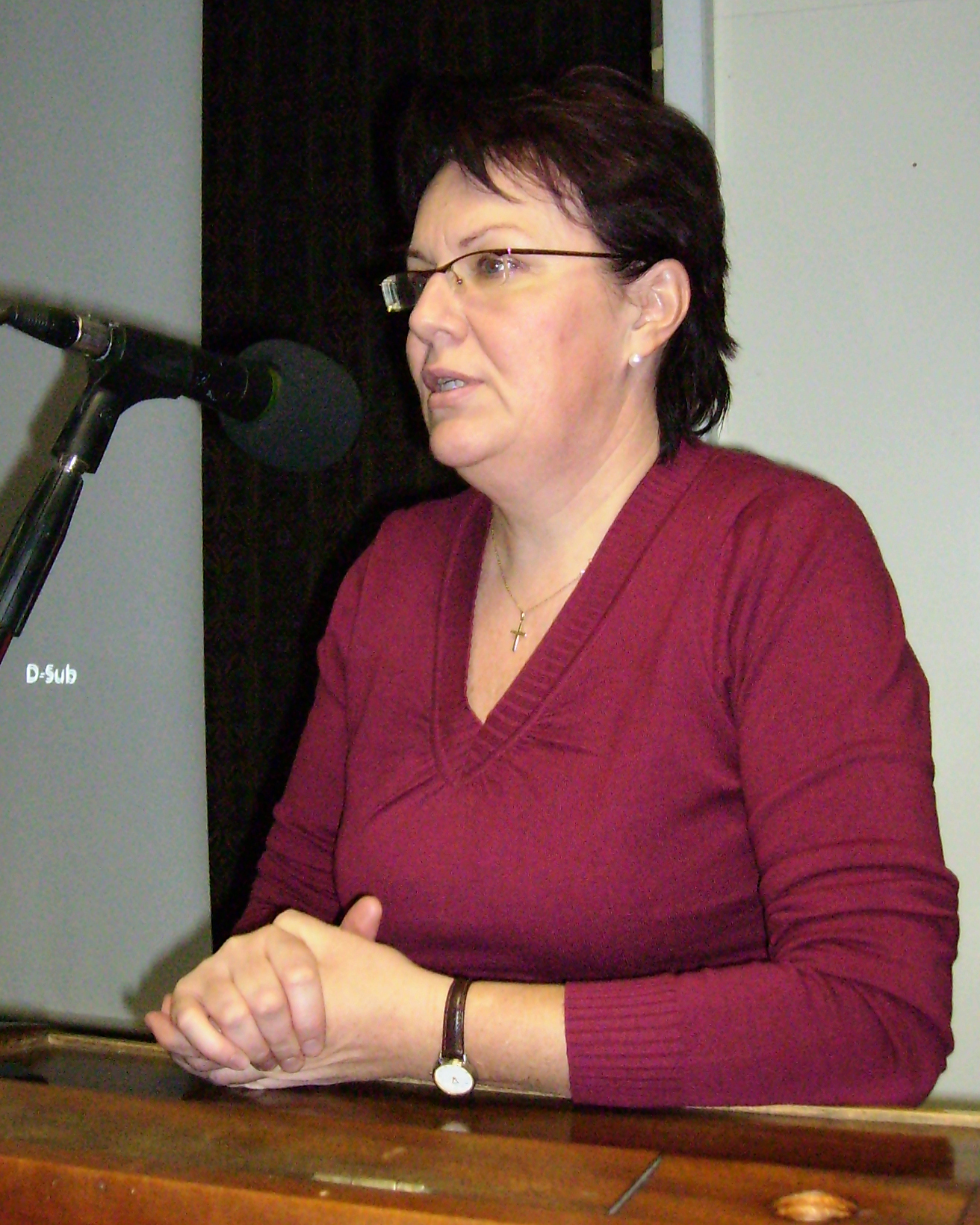
Candidate	Martin Bursík	Dana Kuchtová
Electoral vote	227	109
Percentage	65%	31%
Leader of Greens before election
Martin Bursík
Elected Leader of Greens
Martin Bursík

The Czech Green Party (SZ) held a leadership election on 9 September 2008. The incumbent leader Martin Bursík defeated challenger Dana Kuchtová.

== Background ==
The Green Party entered the Czech parliament following the 2006 legislative election, and joined a coalition government with the Civic Democratic Party (ODS) and Christian and Democratic Union - Czechoslovak People's Party (KDU-ČSL). Conflicts within the party began in 2008 with Dana Kuchtová and Olga Zubová criticising Bursík. Bursík announced in July 2008 that a leadership election would be held in September 2008. Kuchtová announced that she would run against Bursík.

== Voting ==
There were six candidates in total. 349 delegates voted, with Bursík receiving 226 votes and winning the election.

Candidate	Votes	
Martin Bursík	227	65.04%
Dana Kuchtová	109	31.23%
Jan Linhart	4	1.15%
Milan Přívratský	3	0.86%
Jiří Růžička	2	0.57%
Arnold Nowak	0	0%
Turnout	349	
