= 2005 Green Party (Czech Republic) leadership election =

- 24 September 2005
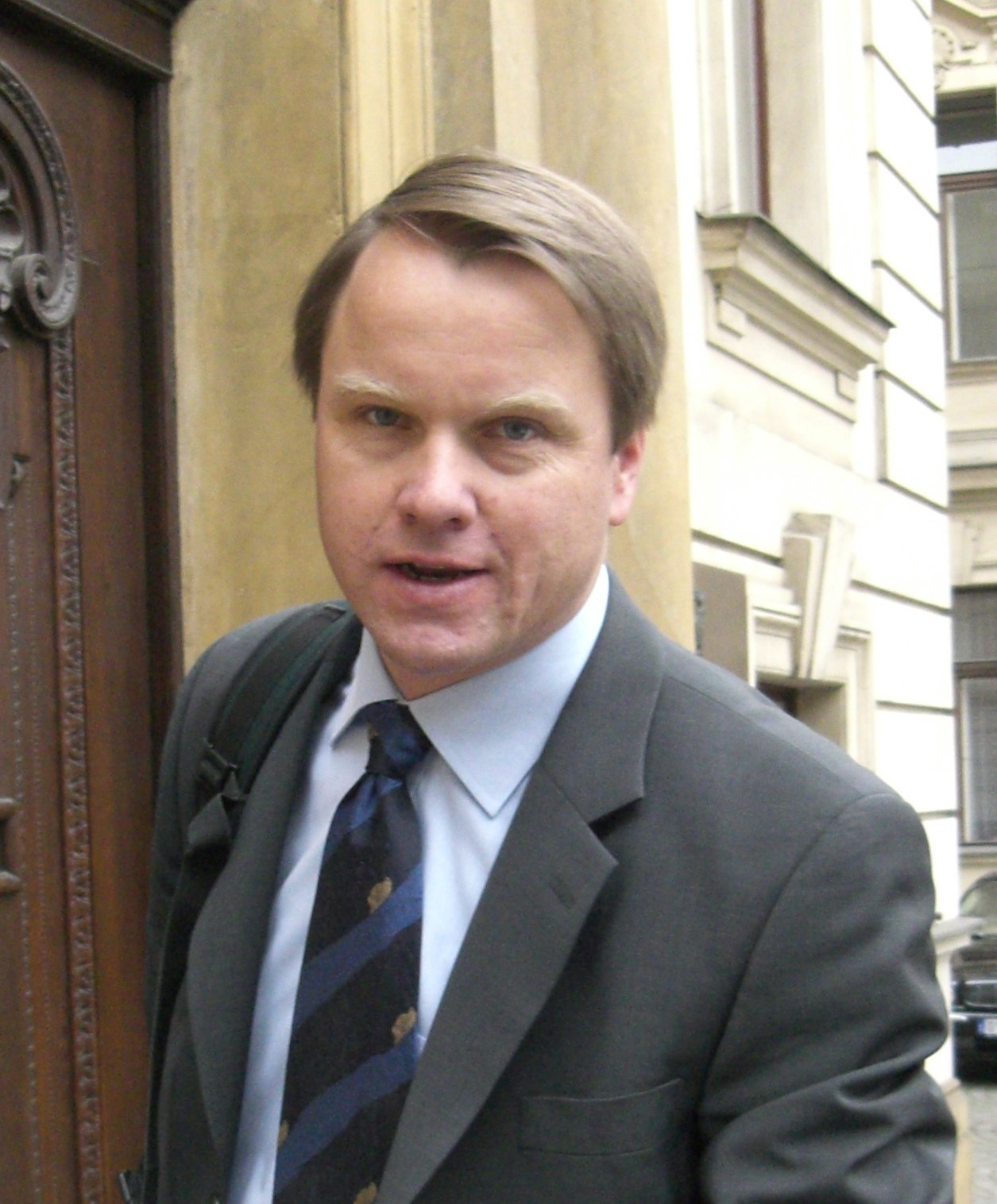

Candidate	Martin Bursík	Karel Helman
Electoral vote	114	17
Percentage	77.6%	11.6%
Leader of Greens before election
Jan Beránek
Elected Leader of Greens
Martin Bursík

The Green Party (SZ) leadership election of 2005 was held on 24 September 2005. Martin Bursík became the new Leader of the Party when he defeated Karel Helman. Bursík's only competition was Karel Helman. Election was held after previous leader Jan Beránek was removed from the position of Leader. Beránek himself decided to not run.

== Voting ==
There were only 2 Candidates. Martin Bursík was viewed as a clear front runner as Karl Helman's candidacy was viewed as a recession. Helman himself admitted during nomination Speech that he doesn't have an Ambition to become party's leader. 147 Delegates voted. Bursík received 114 votes against Helman's 17 votes and was elected.

Candidate	Votes	
Martin Bursík	114	77.55%
Karel Helman	17	11.56%
Invalid and blank votes	16	10.88%
