= 2018 Green Party leadership election =

Green Party leadership elections took place in the following countries during 2018:

- 2018 Green Party of Alberta leadership election
- 2018 Green Party of Aotearoa New Zealand female co-leadership election
- 2018 Green Party (Czech Republic) leadership election
- 2018 Green Party of England and Wales leadership election
