= 2009 Green Party (Czech Republic) leadership election =

Czech political party leadership election

- 5 December 2009
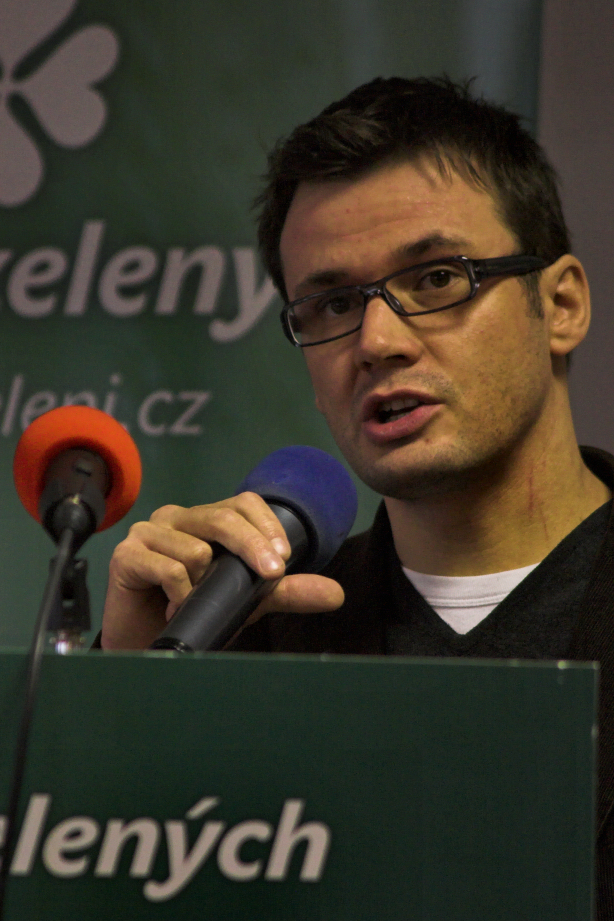

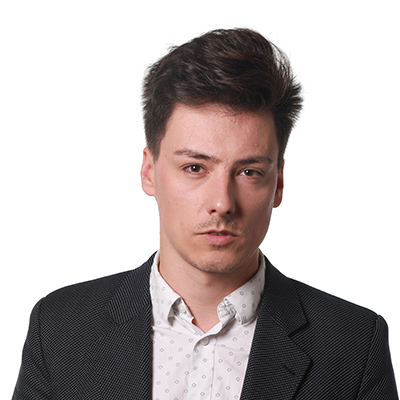

Candidate	Ondřej Liška	Matěj Stropnický	Jan Linhart
Electoral vote	170	60	6
Percentage	72%	25%	2.5%
Leader of Greens before election
Ondřej Liška (acting)
Elected Leader of Greens
Ondřej Liška

The Green Party (SZ) leadership election of 2009 was held on 5 December 2009. Ondřej Liška defeated Matěj Stropnický and became the new Leader.

== Background ==
Martin Bursík resigned on the position of leader after debacle in 2009 European election. Ondřej Liška became acting leader. Election was set for December 2009. Liška decided to run for the position of the Leader. Matěj Stropnický became his main rival.

== Voting ==
There were 4 Candidates - Ondřej Liška, Matěj Stropnický, Josef Jadrný and Jan Linhart. Jadrný withdrawn from election before the election. Liška then defeated both Stropnický and Linhart.

Candidate	Votes	
Ondřej Liška	170	72.03%
Martin Stropnický	60	25.42%
Jan Linhart	6	2.54%
