= Hnutí DUHA =

Czech environmental movement

- Founded: 28 September 1990
- Type: Non-governmental organization
- Location: Brno, Czech Republic
- Region served: Czech Republic
- Website: hnutiduha.cz/

Hnutí DUHA (lit. 'Rainbow Movement') is an environmental movement in the Czech Republic. The movement has been a member of the Friends of the Earth International since 1994.

== History ==
Hnutí DUHA was founded in 1989 by a group of students from Brno, Czechoslovakia shortly before the end of Communist rule, and officially registered as a non-governmental organization on 28 September 1990 under the name Hnutí Duha - Přátelé Země Česká republika (The Rainbow Movement - Friends of the Earth Czech Republic). Since then it has grown into a large organization, eclipsing the other environmental movements (such as Greenpeace) in the country. Among the most well-known members are Vojtěch Kotecký and two of the founders: Jan Beránek and Jakub Patočka. Several members of Hnutí DUHA have become prominent members of the Czech Green Party but the movement is nominally independent of political parties.

As of 2018 the organisation employs around 40 people, between its main offices in Brno and a smaller office in Prague. Ten branches were established throughout the country, starting with Olomouc in 1991. Large numbers of volunteers, usually students, participate in the activities of Hnutí DUHA. The movement rejects formal hierarchical structure and prefers to work in task-oriented semi-independent groups. The 2005 budget was less than 11 million CZK, and has decreased steadily since then. About 60% of funding comes from foundations, such as the Heinrich Böll Foundation, and about 15% from Czech government grants. The remainder consists of individual contributions and profit from the organisation's web-based publishing house. Starting in 2001, the movement issues a bi-monthly journal Sedmá generace (The Seventh Generation).

The movement organizes protest campaigns (e.g. a long campaign against the Temelín Nuclear Power Station during the 1990s), provides environmental impact estimates for assessment processes and for new legislative acts, offers ecological services for individuals and municipalities and promotes the use of renewable technologies. It has contributed to the cancellation or delay of several large construction projects, including a new highway to southern Bohemia, and expansion of lignite mining in northern Bohemia.

Hnutí DUHA is one of 30 national organisations represented in the Friends of the Earth Europe umbrella organisation.
