= 2015 Green Party (Czech Republic) leadership election =

- 24 January 2015
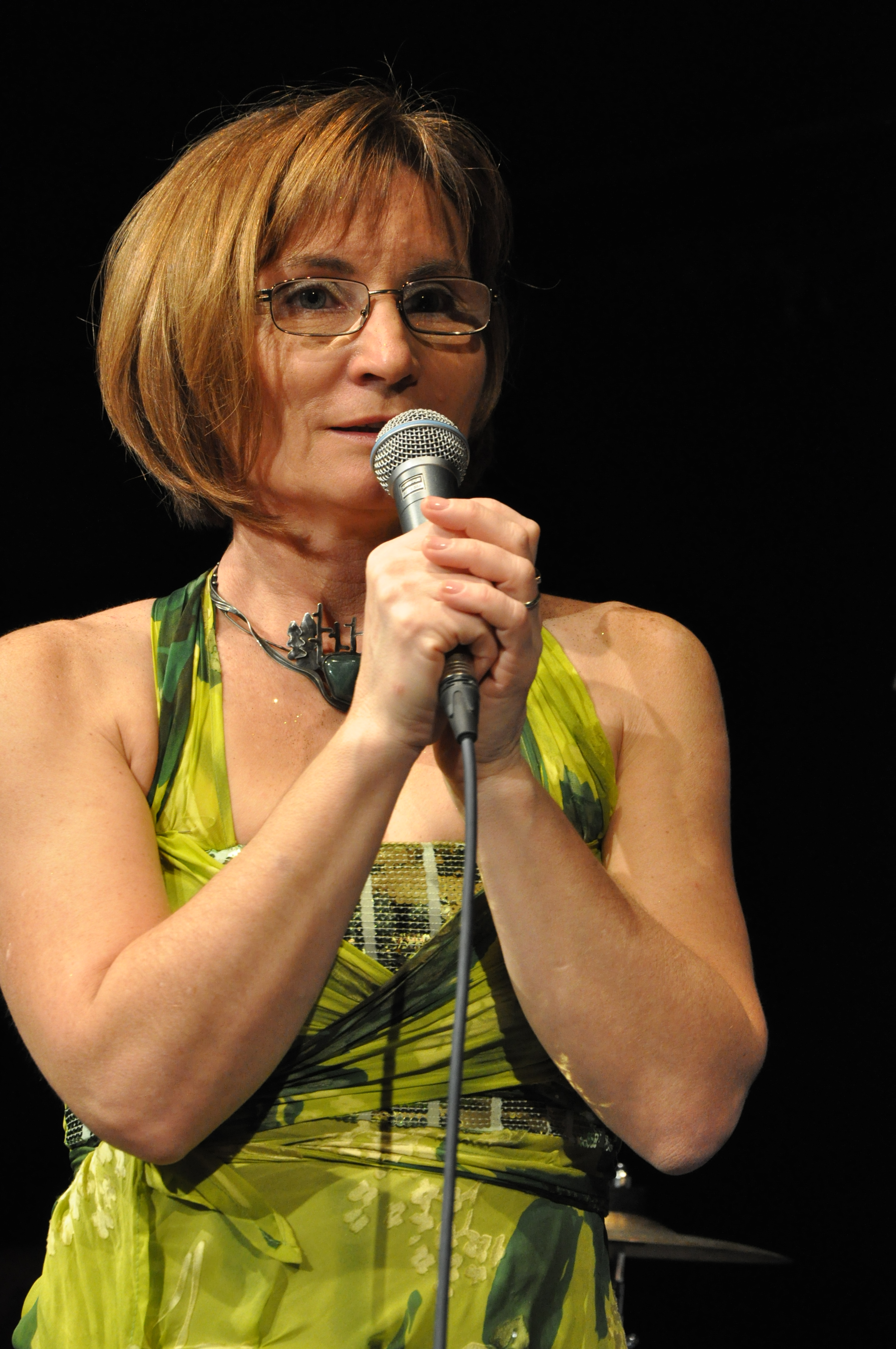

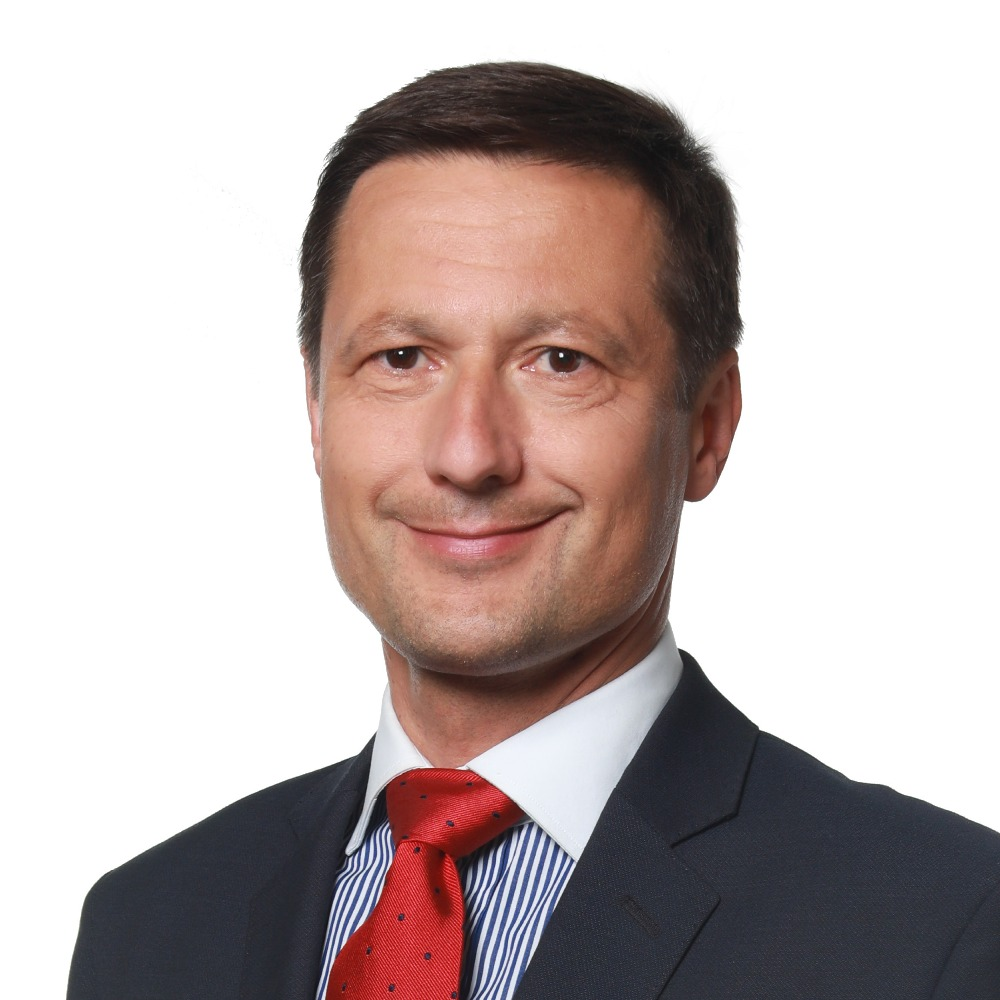

Candidate	Jana Drápalová	Petr Štěpánek	Tomáš Schejbal
Electoral vote	115	69	11
Percentage	58%	35%	5.6%
Leader of Greens before election
Ondřej Liška
Elected Leader of Greens
Jana Drápalová

The Green Party (SZ) leadership election of 2015 was held on 24 January 2015. Jana Drápalová became the first female leader of the Party, by defeating Petr Štěpánek and Tomáš Schejbal.

== Candidates ==
- Jana Drápalová
- Tomáš Schejbal
- Petr Štěpánek

== Voting ==
Voting was held on 24 January 2015. Drápalová and Štěpánek were considered main Candidates. Štěpánek in his nomination Speech. He focused on his political experiences and opposition to Fossil Fuels and Nuclear Energy. Drápalová stated that Greens have to be more united. She also stated that it was a key goal for the Party to return to the Chamber of Deputies. Schejbal stated to he wants the Green Party to be more left wing noting Syriza and Podemos as an inspiration. He stated that Europe is on the Crossroad: "Socialism or Death."

Drápalová received 115 votes of 198 and was elected. Her main rival Štěpánek had 69 votes while third Candidate Schejbal only 11

Candidate	Votes	%
Jana Drápalová	115	58.08%
Petr Štěpánek	69	34.85%
Tomáš Schejbal	11	5.56%
Invalid	3	1.52%
