= Vladimír Tošovský =

Czech politician

Minister of Industry and Trade
- In office 8 May 2009 – 13 July 2010
- Prime Minister: Jan Fischer
- Preceded by: Martin Říman
- Succeeded by: Martin Kocourek

Personal details
- Born: 17 October 1961 (age 64) Prague, Czechoslovakia (now Czech Republic)
- Education: Czech Technical University in Prague

Vladimír Tošovský (born 17 October 1961) is a Czech politician. He was the Minister of Industry and Trade in the caretaker government of Jan Fischer.
