= 2018 Green Party (Czech Republic) leadership election =

- 20 January 2018
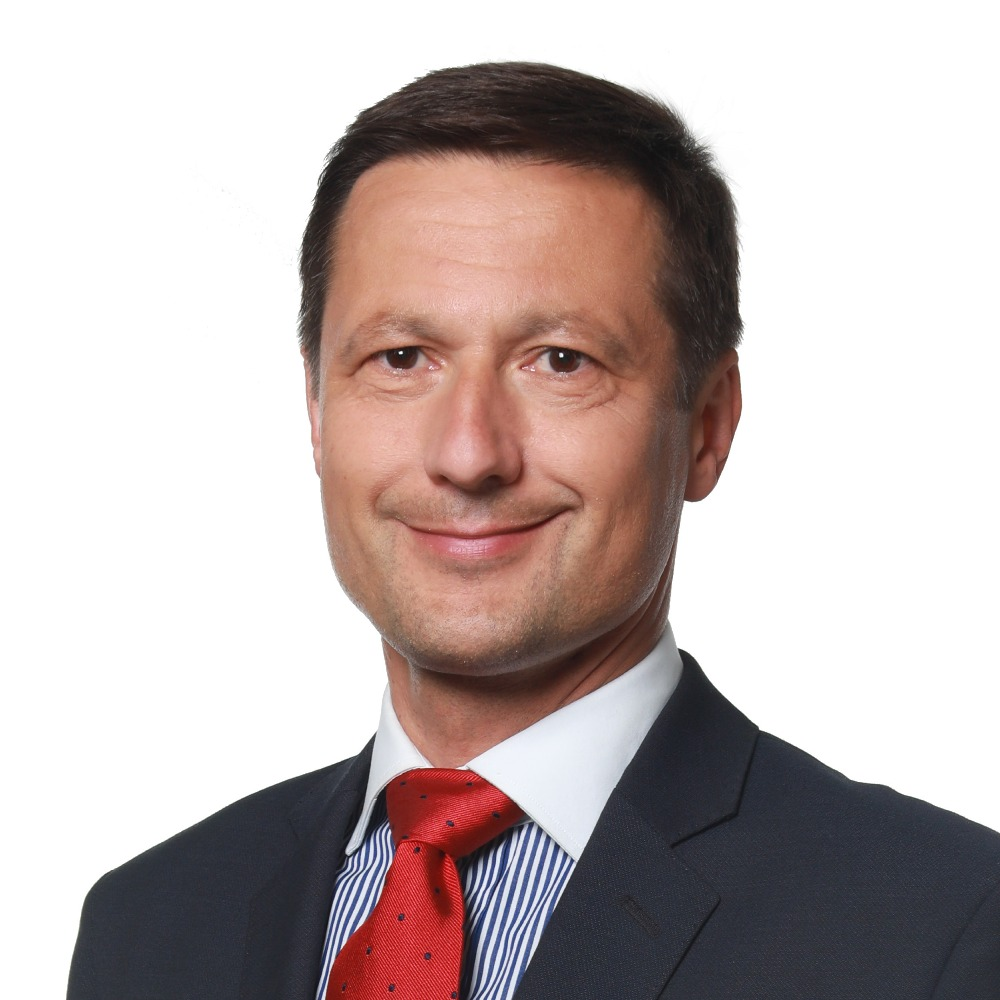

| Candidate | Petr Štěpánek | František Vosecký | Jan Šlechta |
| Electoral vote | 119 | 94 | 6 |
| Percentage | 54.3% | 42.9% | 2.7% |
Leader of Greens before election
Matěj Stropnický
Elected Leader of Greens
Petr Štěpánek

The Green Party (SZ) leadership election of 2018 was held on 20 January 2018. The incumbent leader Matěj Stropnický wasn't running for reelection. It will be held following 2017 legislative election in which party received only 1.46% of votes. Mayor of Prague 4 Petr Štěpánek was elected the new leader.

== Background ==
Matěj Stropnický led the party since 2016. He was known for his radical left-wing ideas. The party suffered heavy defeat under his leadership in 2017 legislative election and received only 1.46% and lost state contribution. Stropnický resigned on his position and announced he won't seek reelection.

Some members called Michal Berg to run for the position. Berg stated that his candidacy is unlikely. Election was called for 20 January 2018. There are 4 candidates for the position of leader.

== Candidates ==
- Petr Kutílek, Deputy Chairman of the party and manager
- Jan Šlechta, teacher and mountain climber
- Petr Štěpánek, biologist, university professor and Mayor of Prague 4
- František Vosecký, councillor of Prague 7

== Voting ==
| Candidate | Votes | % |
|---|---|---|
| Petr Štěpánek | 119 | 54.34% |
| František Vosecký | 94 | 42.92% |
| Jan Šlechta | 6 | 2.74% |

Voting was held on 20 January 2018. Petr Kutílek withdrawn from election prior voting. Štěpánek has won the election with 119 votes. štěpánek called his victory a return to the political Centre.
