= 2014 Green Party (Czech Republic) leadership election =

- 25 January 2014
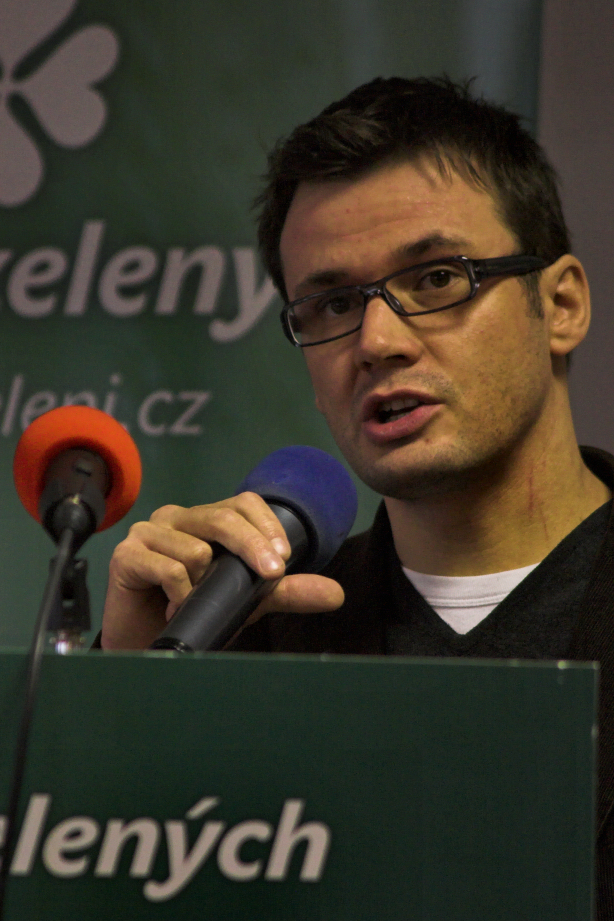

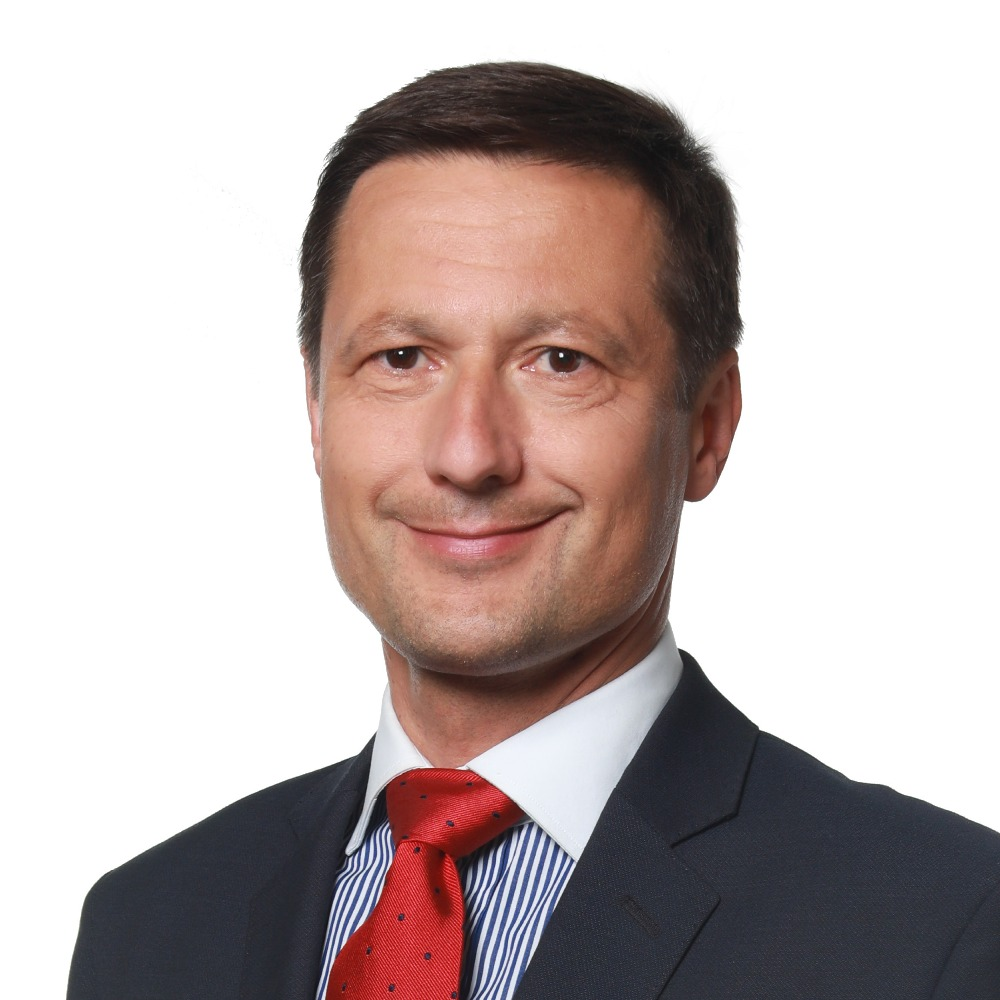
Candidate	Ondřej Liška	Petr Štěpánek
Electoral vote	125	66
Percentage	63%	33%
Leader of Greens before election
Ondřej Liška
Elected Leader of Greens
Ondřej Liška

The Green Party (SZ) leadership election of 2014 was held on 25 January 2014 after party's weak result in 2013 legislative election. Incumbent leader Ondřej Liška defeated Petr Štěpánek and won his fourth term.

== Voting ==
Voting took place on 25 January 2014. 198 delegates voted. Liška received 125 votes and Štěpánek only 66.

Candidate	Votes	
Ondřej Liška	125	63.13%
Petr Štěpánek	66	34.55%
Against	7	3.54%
