= 2020 Green Party leadership election =

Green Party leadership elections took place in the following countries in 2020:

- 2020 Green Party of British Columbia leadership election
- 2020 Green Party of Canada leadership election
- 2020 Green Party (Czech Republic) leadership election
- 2020 Green Party of England and Wales leadership election
- 2020 Green Party leadership election (Ireland)

== See also ==
- 2020 Green Party presidential primaries in the United States
