= 2016 Green Party leadership election =

Green Party leadership elections took place in the following countries during 2016:

- 2016 Green Party (Czech Republic) leadership election
- 2016 Green Party of England and Wales leadership election

== See also ==
- 2016 Green Party presidential primaries
