= Miroslava Kopicová =

Czech politician

Minister of Education
- In office 8 May 2009 – 13 July 2010
- Prime Minister: Jan Fischer
- Preceded by: Ondřej Liška
- Succeeded by: Josef Dobeš
- In office 4 Sep 2006 – 9 Jan 2007
- Prime Minister: Mirek Topolánek
- Preceded by: Petra Buzková
- Succeeded by: Dana Kuchtová

Personal details
- Born: 3 October 1951 (age 75) Kadaň, Czechoslovakia
- Education: Charles University

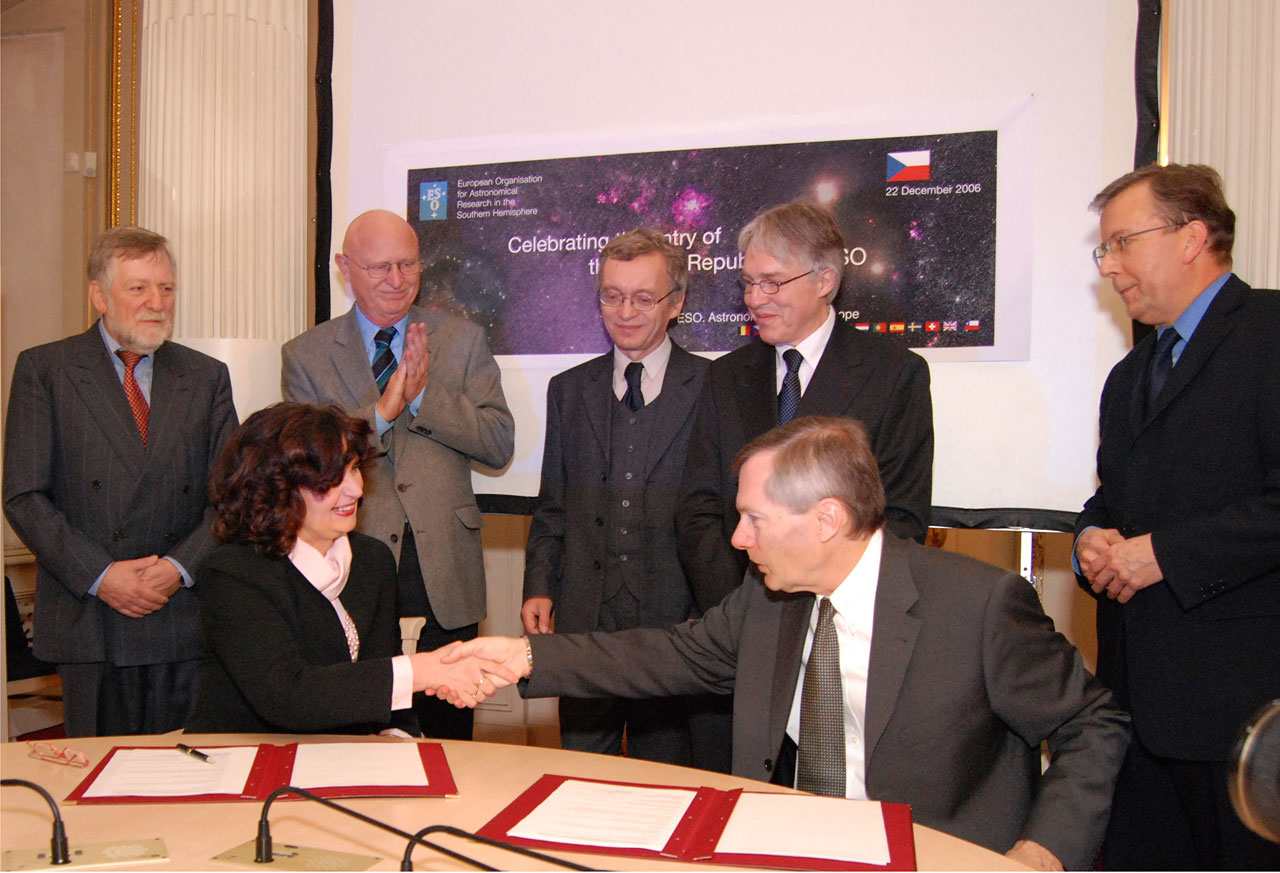
Kopicová signs an ESO agreement

Miroslava Kopicová (born 3 October 1951) is a Czech politician. She was the Minister of Education in the Mirek Topolánek's First Cabinet and in the caretaker government of Jan Fischer.
