= 2007 Green Party (Czech Republic) leadership election =

- 16 February 2007
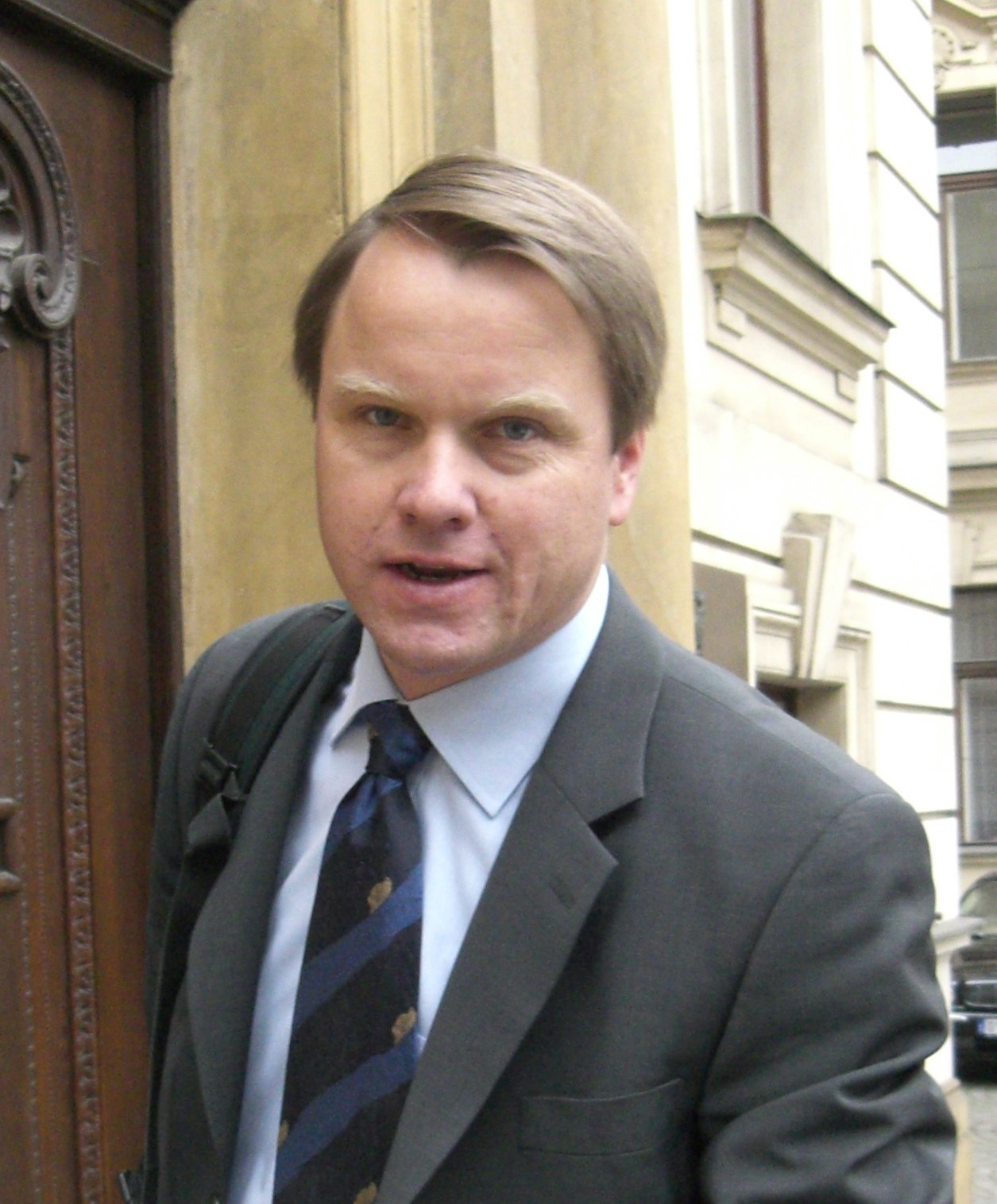
Candidate	Martin Bursík
Electoral vote	212
Percentage	77.1%
Leader of Greens before election
Martin Bursík
Elected Leader of Greens
Martin Bursík

The Green Party (SZ) leadership election of 2007 was held on 16 February 2007. Martin Bursík was reelected for his second term. Bursík was the sole Candidate.

== Voting ==
275 delegates voted. Bursík received 212 votes and thus won the election.

Candidate	Votes	
Martin Bursík	212	77.09%
Blank votes	61	22.18%
Invalid	2	0.73%
