= Ladislav Miko =

Slovak environmental expert and politician

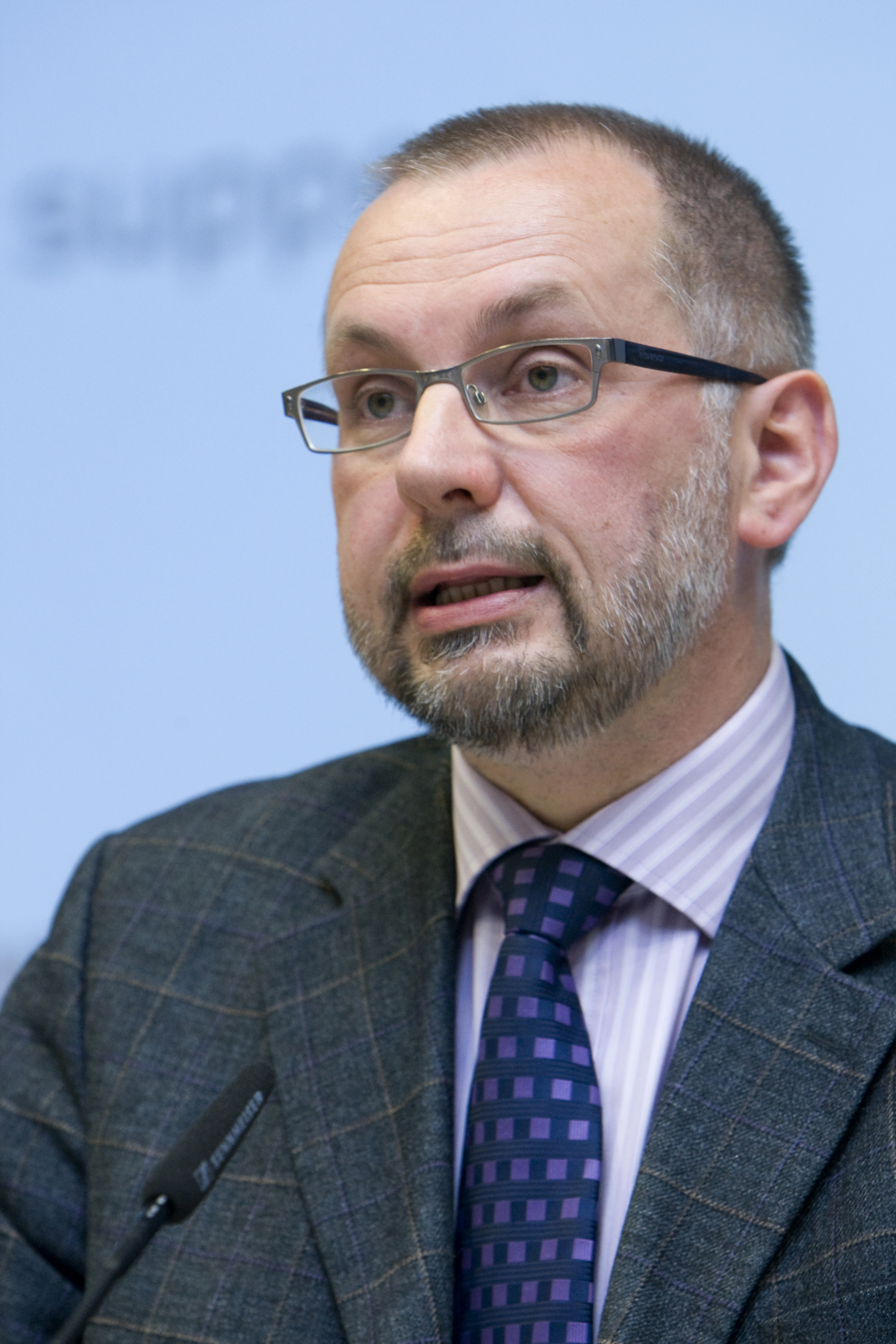

Minister of Environment
- In office 8 May 2009 – 30 November 2009
- Prime Minister: Jan Fischer
- Preceded by: Martin Bursík
- Succeeded by: Jan Dusík

Personal details
- Born: 9 April 1961 (age 65) Košice, Czechoslovakia
- Party: Liberal-Environmental Party
- Profession: Ecologist

Ladislav Miko (born 9 April 1961) is Slovak environmental expert and politician. He was the Minister of Environment in the caretaker government of Jan Fischer but later returned to work for the European Commission. In years 2011–2017 he served as the Deputy Director General of Directorate General for Health and Food Safety (DG SANCO) with responsibilities for the food chain, From January 2018 he was appointed as a Head of EU Representation in Slovakia.
