= 2008 Green Party leadership election =

Green Party leadership elections took place in the following countries during 2008:

- 2008 Green Party (Czech Republic) leadership election
- 2008 Green Party of England and Wales leadership election

== See also ==
- 2008 Green Party presidential primaries
