= 2012 Green Party leadership election =

Green Party leadership elections took place in the following countries during 2012:

- 2012 Green Party (Czech Republic) leadership election
- 2012 Green Party of England and Wales leadership election
- 2012 Green Party of Prince Edward Island leadership election

== See also ==
- 2012 Green Party presidential primaries in the United States
