= 2022 Green Party leadership election =

Green Party leadership, or deputy leadership, elections were held in the following countries in 2022:

- 2022 Green Party of Aotearoa New Zealand co-leadership election
- 2022 Green Party of Canada leadership election
- 2022 Green Party (Czech Republic) leadership election
- 2022 Green Party of England and Wales deputy leadership election
