= Liberal-Environmental Party =

Liberal Environmental Party Liberálně-ekologická strana
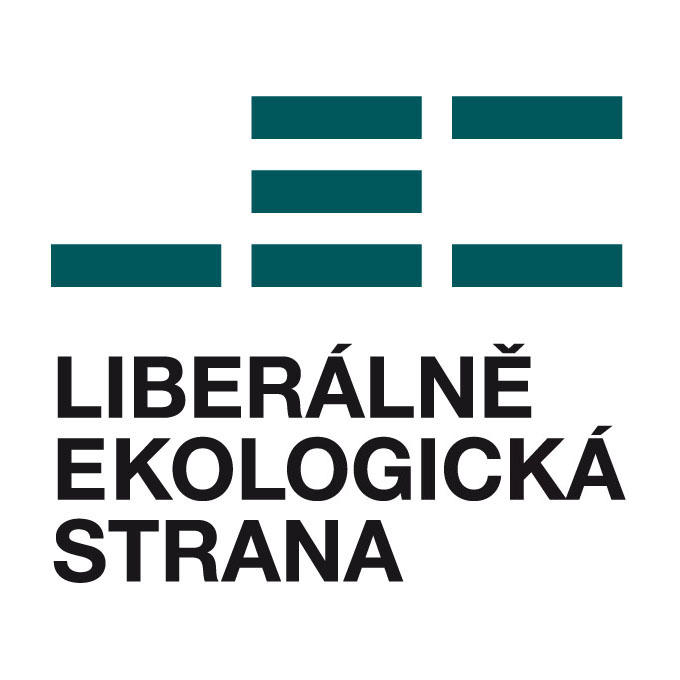
- Leader: Džamila Stehlíková
- Deputy Leader: Ladislav Miko
- Founder: Martin Bursík
- Founded: 2013
- Split from: Green Party
- Headquarters: Prague
- Ideology: Green liberalism Pro-Europeanism
- Political position: Centre
- National affiliation: TOP 09
- Colours: Garganey Blue
- Chamber of Deputies: 0 / 200
- Senate: 0 / 81
- Regional Councils: 0 / 45
- Local Councils: 0 / 62,300

Website
- http://www.stranales.cz

Liberal Environmental Party (Czech: Liberálně-ekologická strana, LES) is a green-liberal political party in the Czech Republic. It was established by Martin Bursík as a split from Green Party. The party is pro-European and supports Václav Havel's legacy.

== History ==
LES participated in the 2014 European Parliament election, receiving 7544 votes (0.49%) and failing to win any seats.

The party announced on 12 July 2017 that it would participate in the 2017 legislative election on the electoral lists of TOP 09.

== Electoral results ==
=== European parliament ===
Year	Vote	Vote %	Seats	Place
2014	7 514	0.49	0	16th
