= November 2024 Green Party (Czech Republic) leadership election =

- 2 November 2024
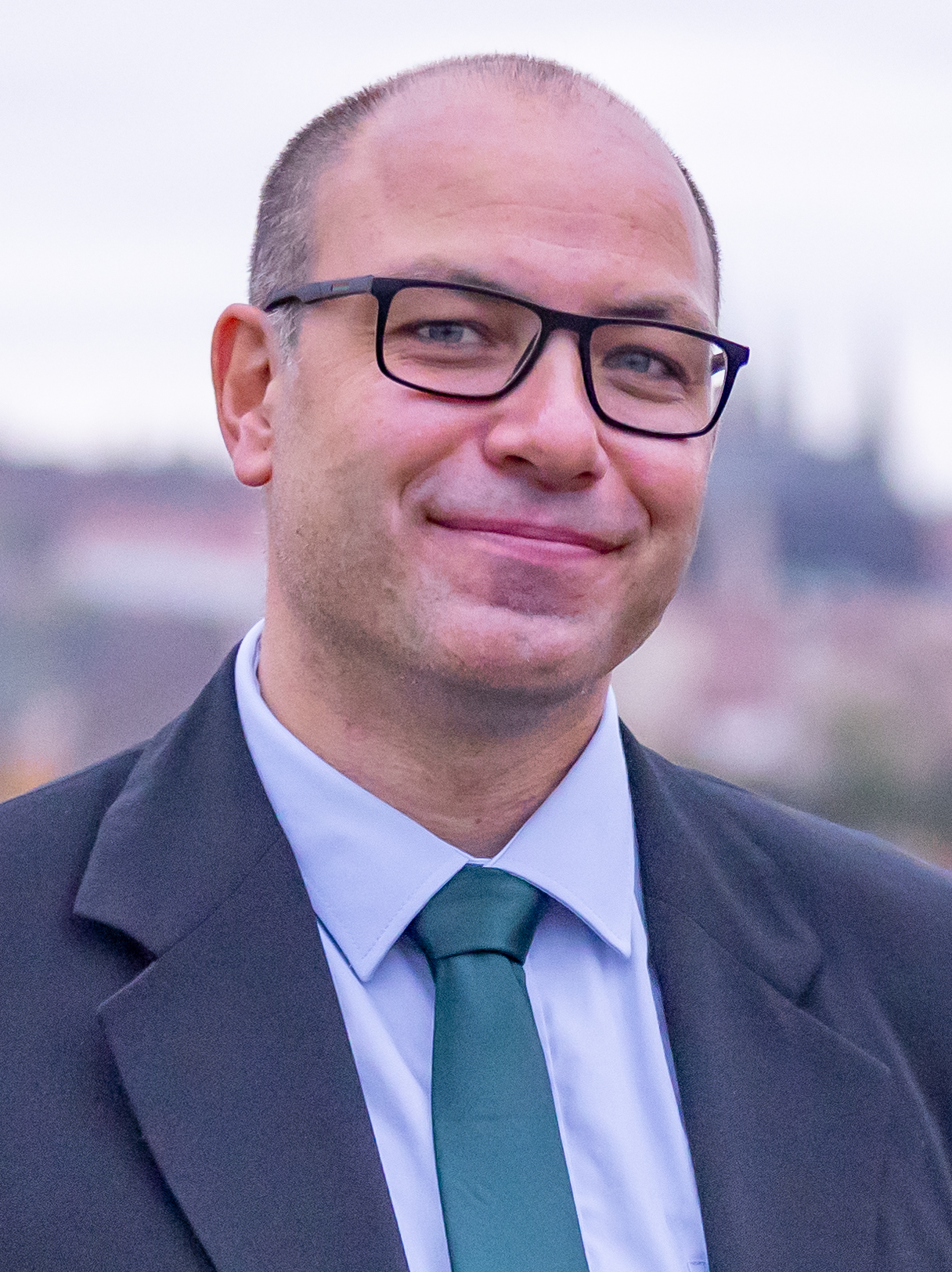

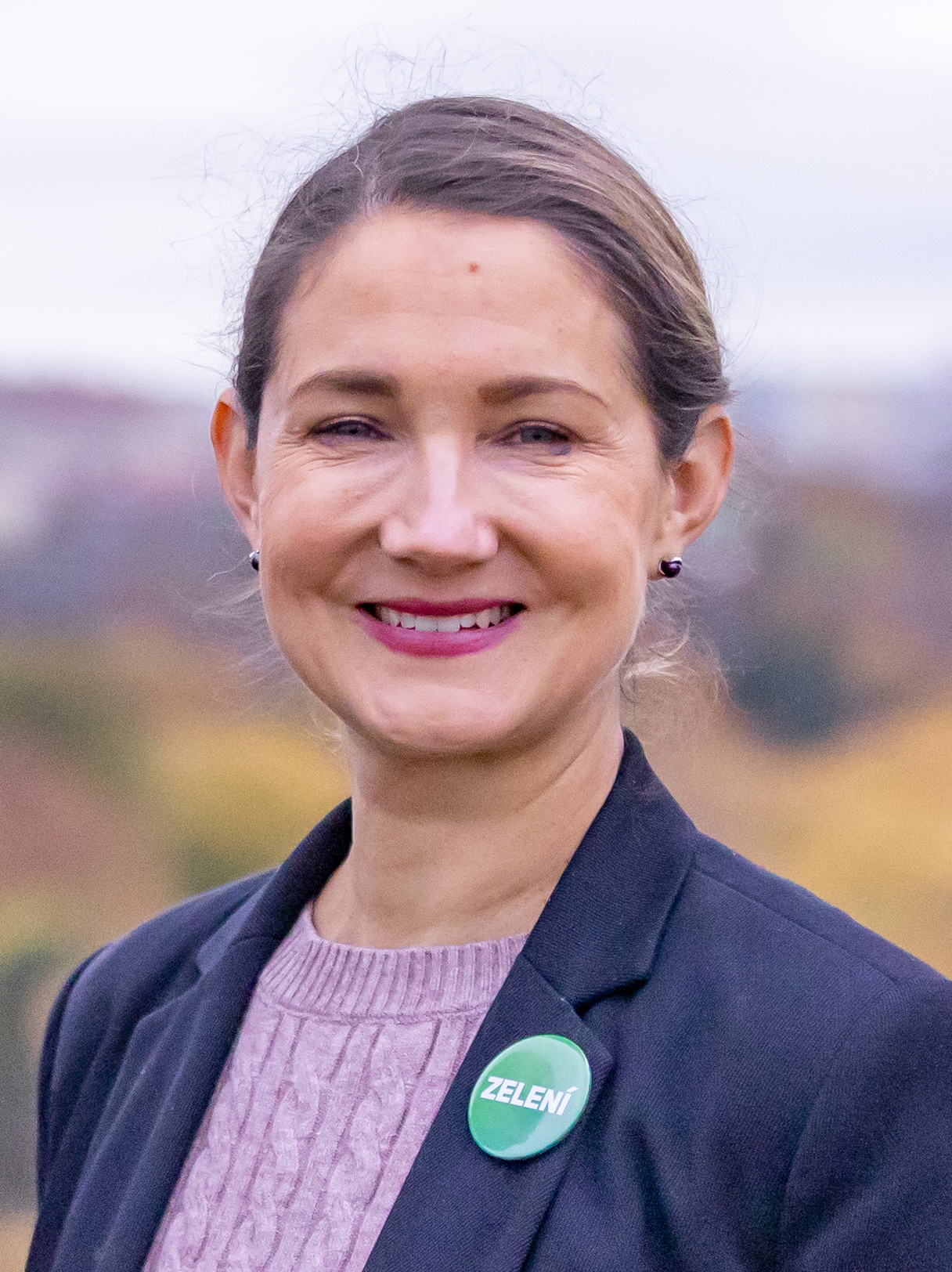
| Candidate | Matěj Pomahač |
| Electoral vote | 97 |
| Percentage | 75.2% |
| Candidate | Gabriela Svárovská |
| Electoral vote | 121 |
| Percentage | 93.8% |
Co-leaders of the Greens before election
Michal Berg
Magdalena Davis
Elected Co-leaders of the Greens
Matěj Pomahač
Gabriela Svárovská

The Green Party (Greens) leadership election of 2024 was held on 2 November 2024. Both Gabriela Svárovská and Matěj Pomahač ran unopposed and thus were elected.

== Background and election ==
Co-leader Michal Berg resigned after party poor result in the 2024 European Parliament election, the party received 1.55%. Co-leader Magdalena Davis resigned after poor party result in the 2024 Czech regional elections, the party defended only one mandate out of seven.

== Voting ==
=== Female ===
| Candidate | Votes | |
|---|---|---|
| Gabriela Svárovská | 121 | 93.8% |
| None of the above | 8 | 6.2% |

=== Male ===
| Candidate | Votes | |
|---|---|---|
| Matěj Pomahač | 97 | 75.2% |
| None of the above | 32 | 24.8% |
