= 2020 Green Party (Czech Republic) leadership election =

- 25 January 2020
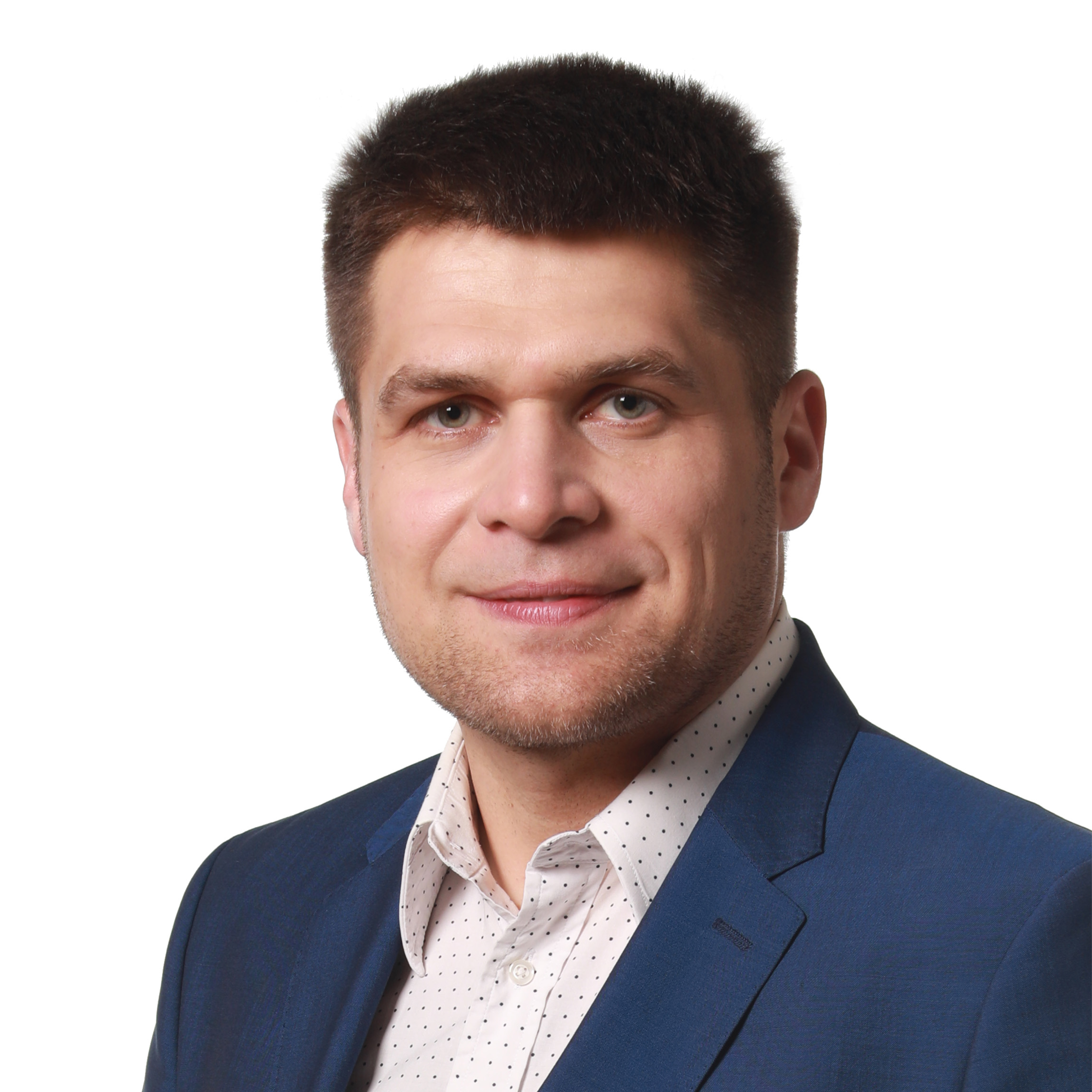

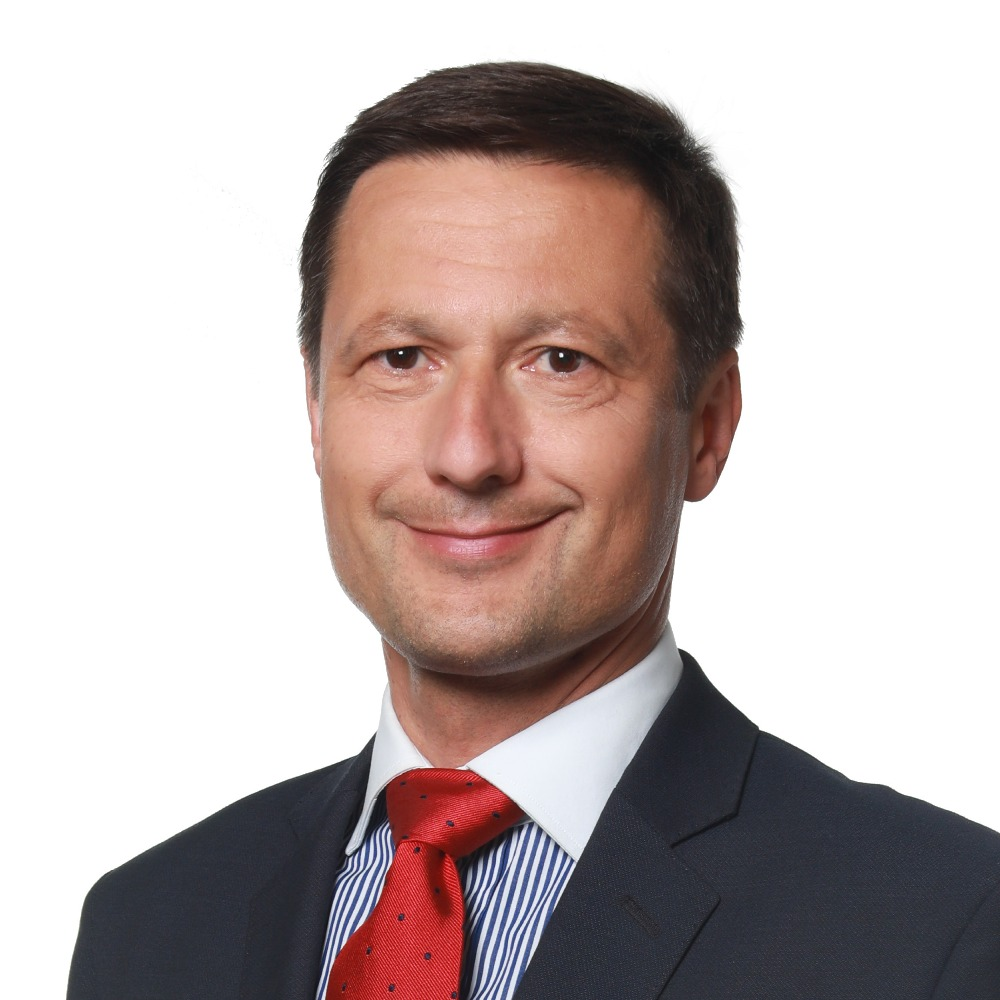

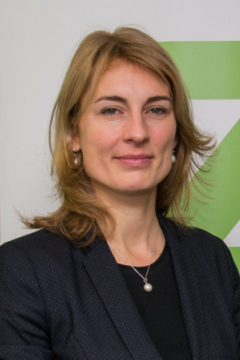
Candidate	Michal Berg	Petr Globočník	Petr Štěpánek
Electoral vote	141	57	13
Percentage	66.8%	27.0%	6.2%
Candidate	Magdalena Davis	Anna Gümplová
Electoral vote	115	95
Percentage	54.8%	45.2%
Leader of Greens before election
Petr Štěpánek
Elected Leader of Greens
Michal Berg
Magdalena Davis

The Green Party (SZ) leadership election of 2020 was held on 25 January 2020 when the Green Party elected its co-leaders. Petr Štěpánek, Michal Berg and Petr Globočník ran for the position of male co-leader while Magdalena Davis and Anna Gümplová ran for position of female co-leader. Michal Berg and Magdalena Davis received highest number of votes and were elected.

== Background ==
Petr Štěpánek was elected leader of Green Party on 20 January 2018 following party's loss in 2017 legislative election. The party has since changed its statute so it will be led by co-leaders, one male and one female. Štěpánek decided to run for the position of male leader. Petr Globočník and Michal Berg announced their decisions to challenge Štěpánek. Magdalena Davis and Anna Gümplová submitted candidacies for the female leader.

== Voting ==
=== Female ===
Candidate	Votes	
Magdalena Davis	115	54.76%
Anna Gümplová	95	45.24%
Turnout	210	

=== Male ===
Candidate	Votes	
Michal Berg	141	66.82%
Petr Globočník	57	27.01%
Petr Štěpánek	13	6.16%
Turnout	211	
