= Dana Kuchtová =

Czech politician

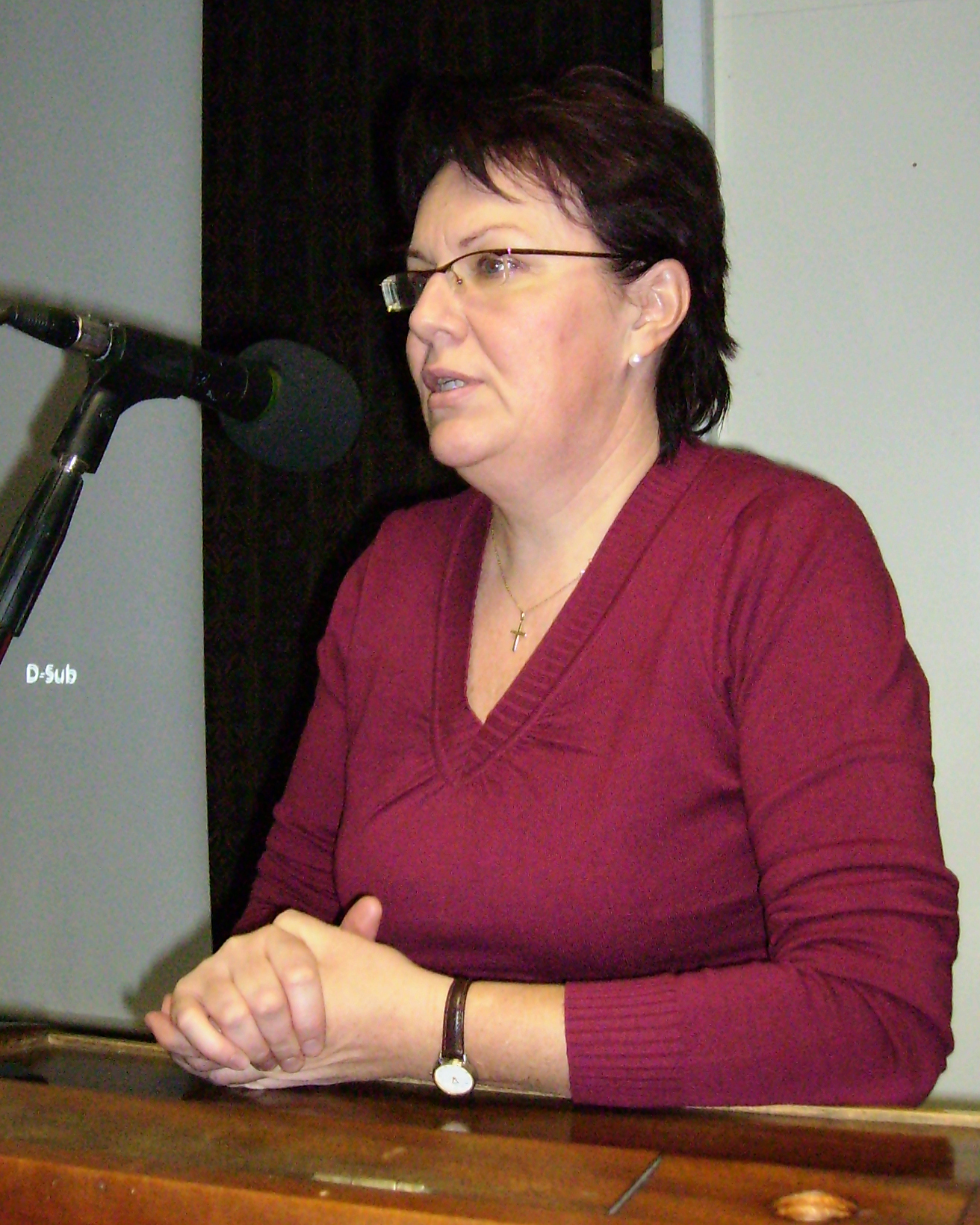

Minister of Education
- In office 9 January 2007 – 4 October 2007
- Prime Minister: Mirek Topolánek
- Preceded by: Miroslava Kopicová
- Succeeded by: Ondřej Liška

Personal details
- Born: 18 June 1961 (age 64) Český Krumlov, Czechoslovakia
- Party: Green party

Dana Kuchtová (born 18 June 1961, Český Krumlov, Czechoslovakia) is a Czech politician, teacher and former environmental and anti-nuclear activist.

Kuchova was a leader of the Czech Green Party and was Czech Minister of Education for 10 months in 2007 in the government of Mirek Topolánek.
