= 2022 Green Party (Czech Republic) leadership election =

- 29 January 2022
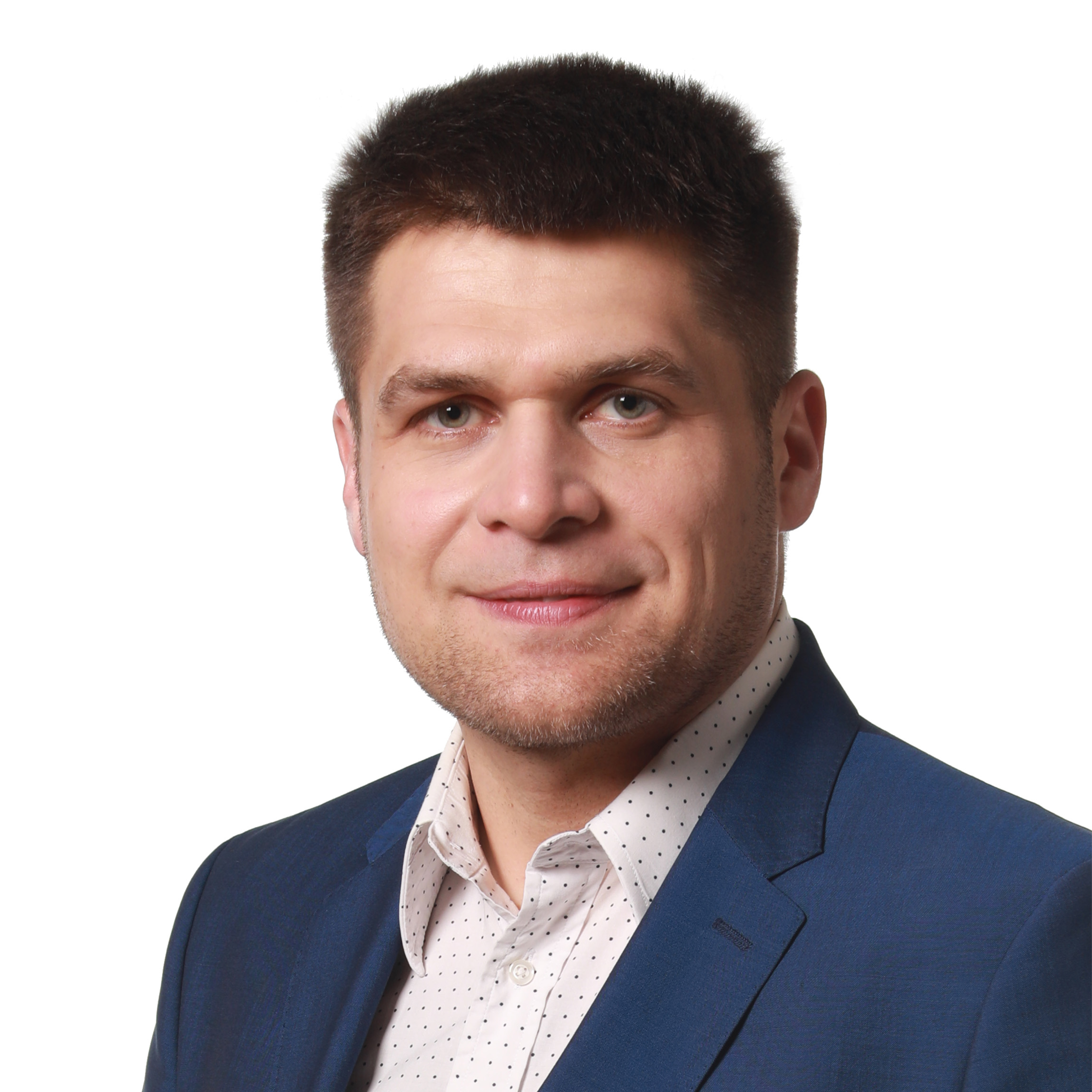

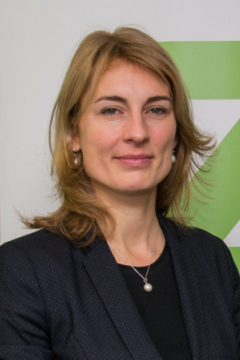
Candidate	Michal Berg
Electoral vote	153
Percentage	90%
Candidate	Magdalena Davis
Electoral vote	142
Percentage	83.5%
Leader of Greens before election
Michal Berg
Magdalena Davis
Elected Leader of Greens
Michal Berg
Magdalena Davis

The Green Party (SZ) leadership election of 2022 was held on 29 January 2022. The incumbents Magdalena Davis and Michal Berg were elected for another term.

== Background and election ==
Magdalena Davis and Michal Berg led Green Party since 2020. The party received 0.99% under their leadership during 2021 Czech legislative election. Both Davis and Berg decided to run for reelection. They were the only candidates.

Election was held on 29 January 2022. Davis received 142 of 170 votes while Berg received 153 votes. They were elected for another term.

== Voting ==
=== Female ===
Candidate	Votes	
Magdalena Davis	142	83.5%

=== Male ===
Candidate	Votes	
Michal Berg	153	90%
