= Jan Beránek =

Czech ecological activist (1970-)

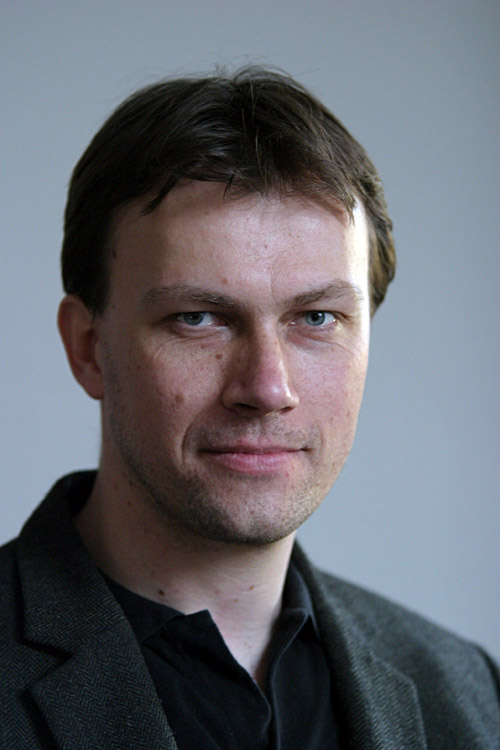
Jan Beránek in 2006

Jan Beránek (born 11 January 1970) is a Czech ecological activist, energy expert, politician, employee of Greenpeace and former member and chairman of Czech Green Party.

He studied physics at the Univerzity of Jan Evangelista Purkyně in Brno from 1988 to 1990. Already at that time, back in 1989, he had established together with his friend Jakub Patocka an environmental organization Hnuti DUHA (Rainbow Movement), which later (1993) became the Czech branch of Friends of the Earth

Soon after the political changes in Czechoslovakia in November 1989, he became a full-time political and environmental activist, and subsequently abandoned the studies. Later, from 1993 to 1995, he also studied sociology at the same university (by then called Masaryk University). However, he did not graduate either.

Has been actively working on issues related to energy, climate change and nuclear power since his studies in late 1980s, with initial focus on the energy policies and the Soviet-designed nuclear power plants in the Czech Republic and other Eastern European countries. He wrote and contributed to several publications about energy and nuclear power, including three commissioned by national and local governments. He also published many articles and analytical papers on those issues. Was invited and spoke as a specialist at several expert hearings in the European Parliament.

In 2002, he has left Hnuti DUHA/Friends of the Earth Czech Republic from a position of an executive director, in order to engage with Czech party politics. In April 2003, he was elected as a chair of the Czech Green Party, and served in this position until September 2005.

Since 2005 he works for Greenpeace, where he first led the energy campaign in Central and Eastern European region. In June 2007, he became the Nuclear Energy Project Leader at Greenpeace International, based in Amsterdam. Among others, he visited Chernobyl in 1996, lead a specialist team to Kashiwazaki-Kariwa following the Japanese earthquake in 2007. In 2011, he acted as a head of the Greenpeace's global crisis response team to Fukushima nuclear disaster. Later he became one of the authors of a highly appraised Greenpeace report "Lessons from Fukushima"

Since 2011, he conducted numerous radiation field work at Fukushima as well as other locations in Japan. Earlier, he was also involved in detecting and analyzing radioactive contamination at sites in Spain, Ukraine, and the Czech Republic. In 2013, he has earned the highest grade at the radiation protection course of the Technical university at Delft, Netherlands.

Since 2017, he has been searching for the fate of his distant relative Silvestr Němec, an interwar employee of Baťa in Singapore, who died in February 1942 as a member of a military unit of Czechoslovak volunteers in city during the Japanese invasion. By the research, the book Pátrání po Silvestrovi (Searching for Sivestr) was eventually published in 2020.

He currently works as energy campaign team leader at Greenpeace International at Amsterdam.
