= 2018 Green Party of Alberta leadership election =

- September 22, 2018
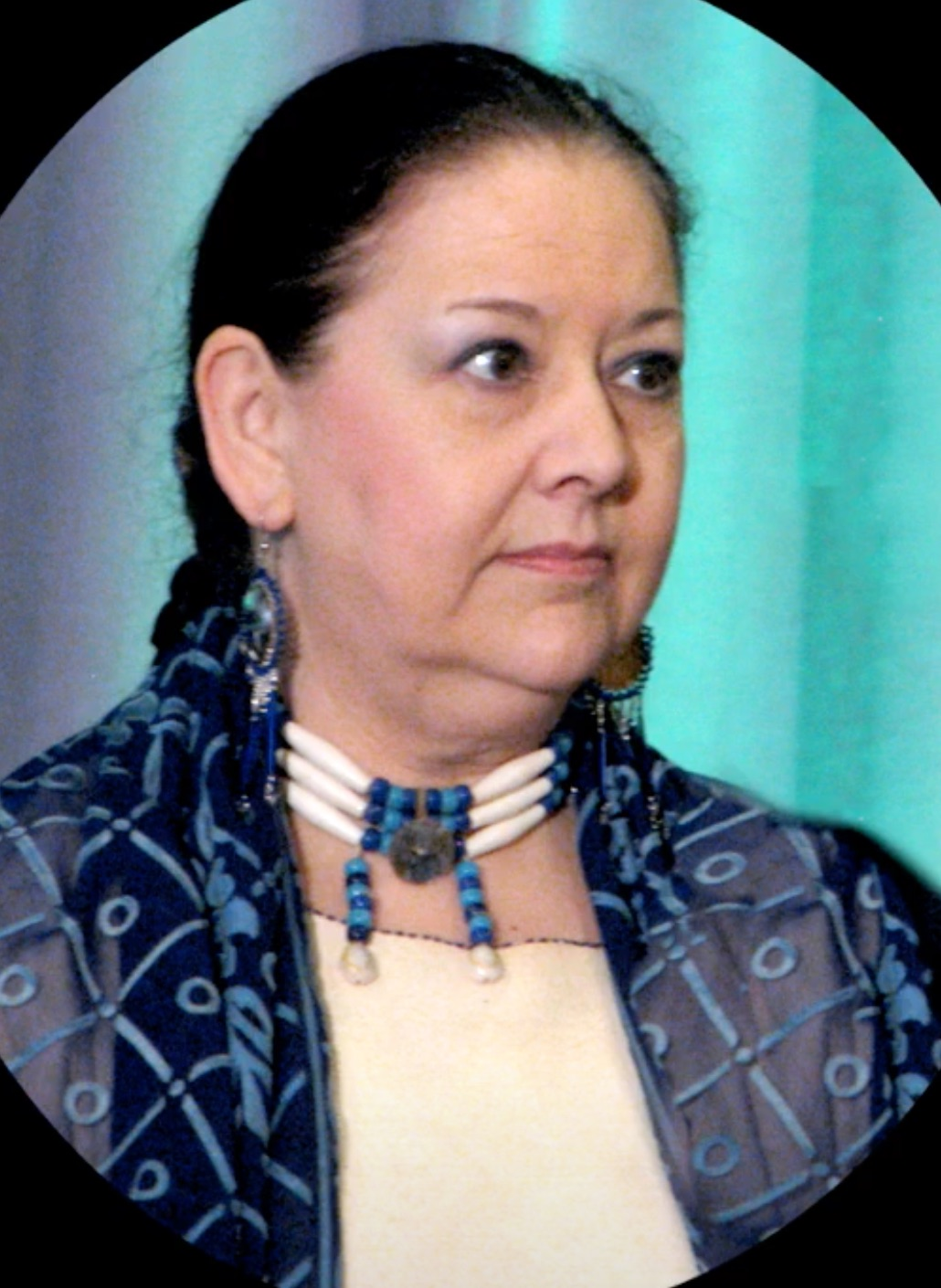
Candidate	Cheryle Chagnon-Greyeyes	Brian Deheer
	NOTA
Candidate	None of the Above
Leader before election
Coral Bliss Taylor (interim)
Elected Leader
Cheryle Chagnon-Greyeyes

2018 Green Party of Alberta leadership election
- Date: September 22, 2018
- Resigning leader: Romy Tittel
- Won by: Cheryle Chagnon-Greyeyes
- Ballots: 1
- Candidates: 2 (+ none of the above)

The 2018 Green Party of Alberta leadership election was spurred after Romy Tittel, who had won the leadership in 2017, resigned without explanation after five months as leader. The party later named Coral Bliss Taylor as interim leader. The winner of the election, Cheryle Chagnon-Greyeyes, was announced on September 22, 2018. She was the first Indigenous woman to lead a provincial party in Canada.

The vote was determined by preferential ballot.

== Confirmed candidates ==
- Cheryle Chagnon-Greyeyes, University of Calgary employee and activist for Indigenous, social justice and environmental causes.
- Brian Deheer, former deputy leader of the Alberta Green Party and business manager for the Portage College Students’ Association.

Matt Levicki entered the race, but withdrew before the vote.

The None of the above ballot option was also available to members.

== Timeline ==
- March 24, 2018 - Tittel resigns as the leader without explanation.
- April 18, 2018 - Coral Bliss Taylor appointed as interim leader.
- July 31, 2018 - Nominations close.
- August 30, 2018 - Candidates announced.
- September 22, 2018 - Results announced.
