= Aleš Řebíček =

Czech politician (born 1967)

Minister of Transport
- In office 4 September 2006 – 23 January 2009
- Prime Minister: Mirek Topolánek
- Preceded by: Milan Šimonovský
- Succeeded by: Petr Bendl

Personal details
- Born: April 14, 1967 (age 59) Kladno, Czechoslovakia
- Party: ODS

Aleš Řebíček (Czech pronunciation: [ˈalɛʃ ˈr̝ɛbiːtʃɛk]; born 14 April 1967, in Kladno) is a Czech politician. In 2006 he was elected a member of the Chamber of Deputies and from September 2006 to January 2009 he was the Minister of Transport.

Řebíček is a graduate of the University of Transport and Communications in Žilina. He's married and has three sons.

From 2011 to 2015 he was a major stockholder of the football club SK Slavia Prague and its chairman.
