= Martin Říman =

Czech politician (born 1961)

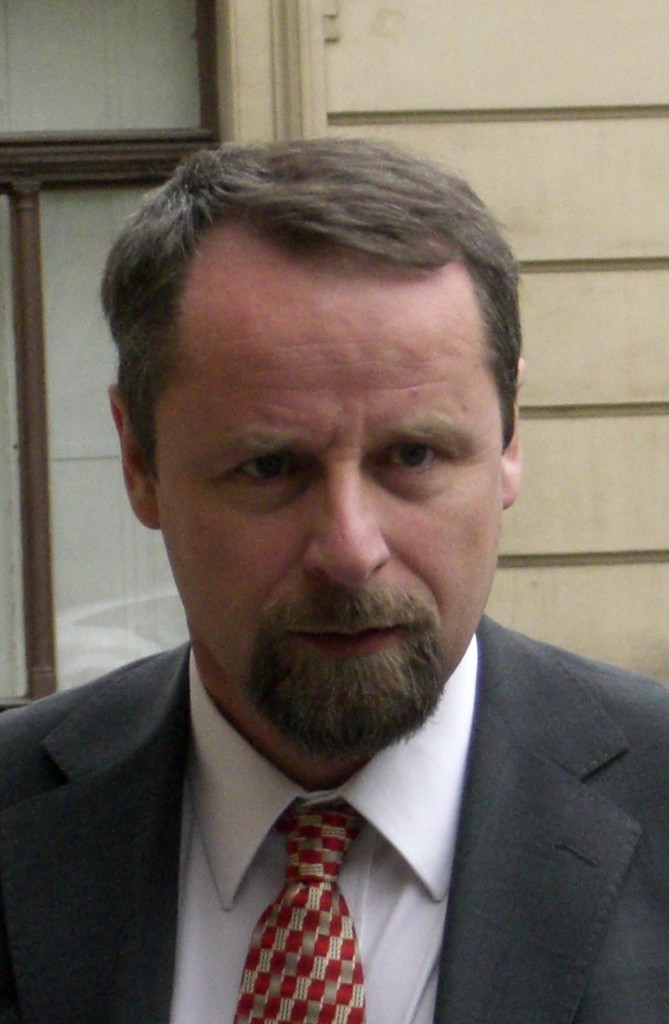

Minister of Industry and Trade
- In office 4 September 2006 – 8 May 2009
- Prime Minister: Mirek Topolánek
- Preceded by: Milan Urban
- Succeeded by: Vladimír Tošovský

Personal details
- Born: May 11, 1961 (age 64) Frýdek-Místek, Czechoslovakia
- Party: ODS

Martin Říman (born 11 May 1961 in Frýdek-Místek) is a Czech politician. In 1996–1998 he was a Minister of Transport. In 2002 he was elected a member of the Chamber of Deputies and since from September 2006 to May 2009, he was Minister of Industry and Trade.

Říman is a graduate of Brno University of Technology. He is married and his wife is a high-school teacher.
