= Matěj Stropnický =

Czech politician, journalist and actor

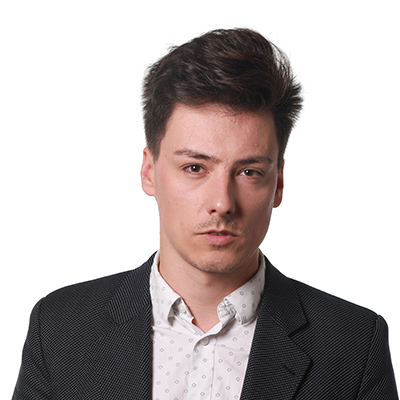

Leader of Green Party
- In office 23 January 2016 – 21 October 2017
- Preceded by: Jana Drápalová
- Succeeded by: Petr Štěpánek

Councillor of Prague
- In office 11 October 2014 – 11 October 2018

Personal details
- Born: 18 September 1983 (age 43) Prague, Czechoslovakia
- Party: Green Party (2003–2020)
- Education: Charles University
- Website: matejstropnicky.cz

Matěj Stropnický (born 18 September 1983) is a Czech left-wing politician, journalist, actor and former leader of the Green party. His father is Martin Stropnický, actor and former Minister of Foreign Affairs.

Stropnický came out as gay on 19 October 2017, stating he is in a relationship with actor Daniel Krejčík.
