= Ondřej Liška =

Czech politician (born 1977)

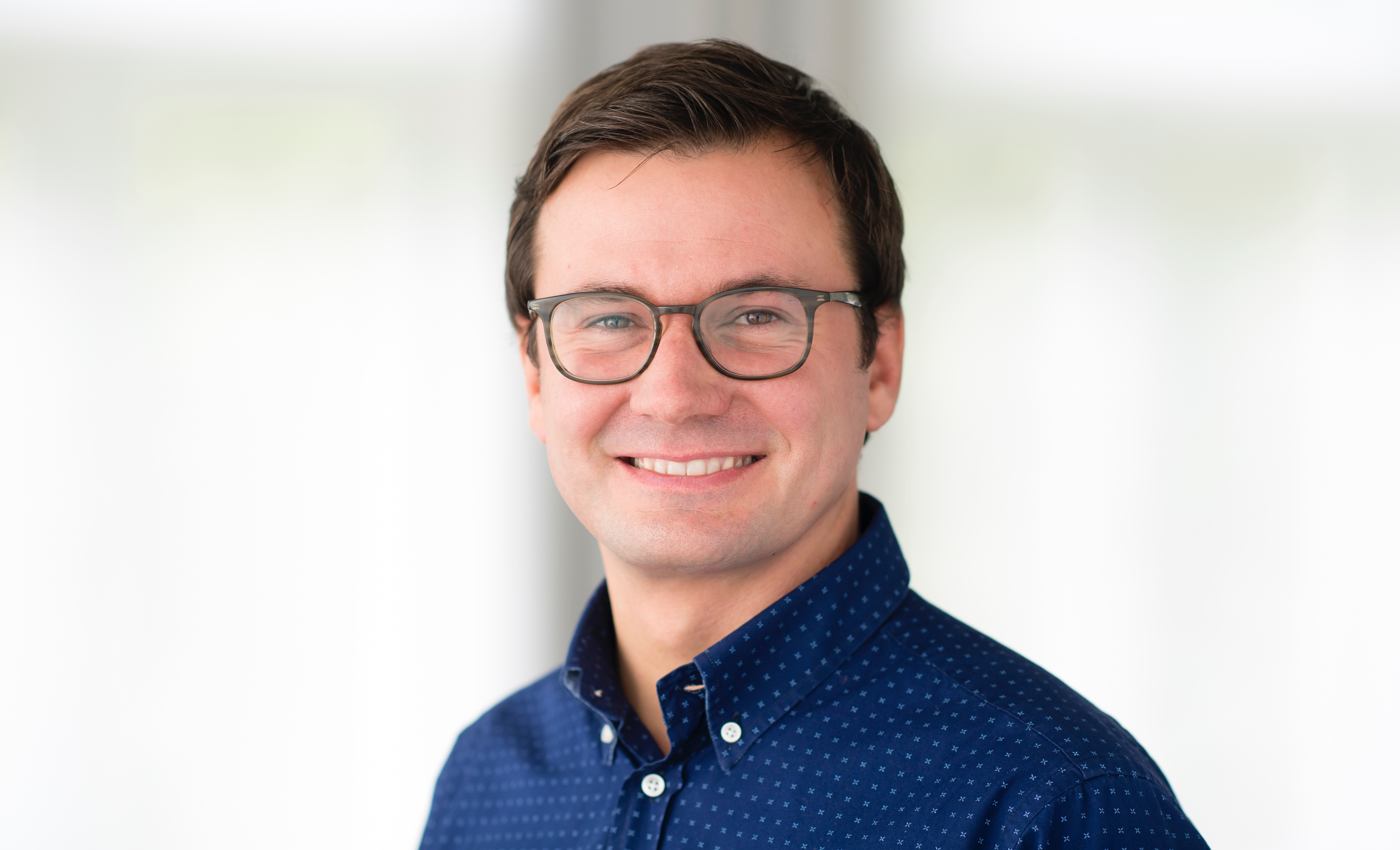

Minister of Education
- In office 4 December 2007 – 8 May 2009
- Prime Minister: Mirek Topolánek
- Preceded by: Dana Kuchtová
- Succeeded by: Miroslava Kopicová

Chairman of the Green Party
- In office 8 June 2009 – 8 June 2014
- Preceded by: Martin Bursík
- Succeeded by: Jana Drápalová

Personal details
- Born: 14 July 1977 (age 49) Brno, Czechoslovakia
- Party: Green party
- Education: Masaryk University

Ondřej Liška (born 14 July 1977; Czech pronunciation: [ˈondr̝ɛj ˈlɪʃka]) is a Czech politician, who served as Minister of Education under Prime Minister Mirek Topolánek in his second cabinet. He was a member of the Chamber of Deputies for South Moravia from the 2006 legislative election until May 2010. He was the chairman of the Green Party.
