= Martin Bursík =

Czech politician

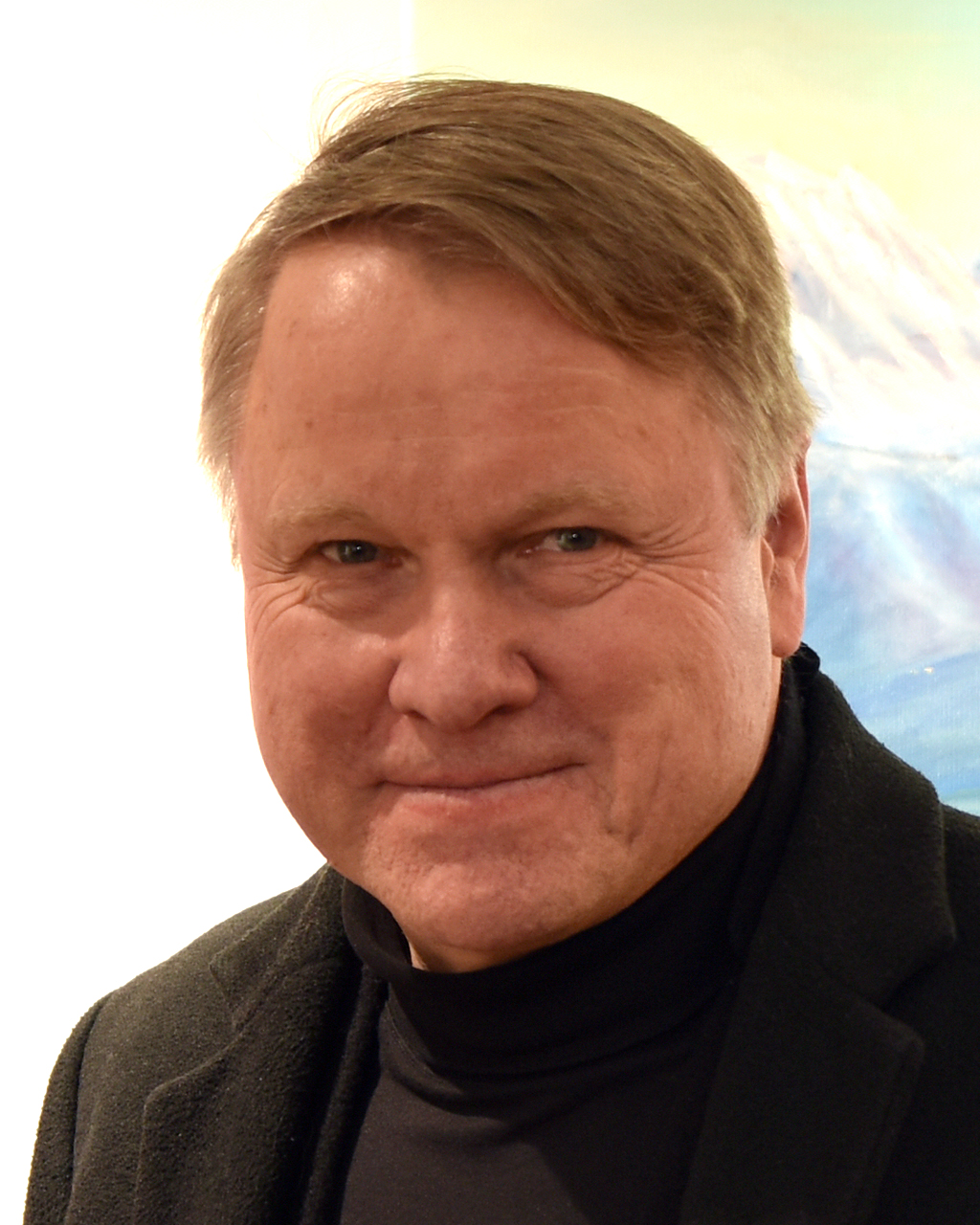
- Bursík in 2026

Deputy Prime Minister of Czech Republic
- In office 9 January 2007 – 8 May 2009
- Prime Minister: Mirek Topolánek

Minister of Environment
- In office 9 January 2007 – 8 May 2009
- Prime Minister: Mirek Topolánek
- Preceded by: Petr Kalaš
- Succeeded by: Ladislav Miko
- In office 27 February 1998 – 22 July 1998
- Prime Minister: Josef Tošovský
- Preceded by: Jiří Skalický
- Succeeded by: Miloš Kužvart

Chairman of the Green Party
- In office September 2005 – 8 June 2009
- Preceded by: Jan Beránek
- Succeeded by: Ondřej Liška

Personal details
- Born: 12 August 1959 (age 67) Prague, Czechoslovakia
- Party: Civic Forum (1989–1991); Civic Movement (1991–1996); KDU–ČSL (1999–2003); Green Party (2004–2013); Liberal-Environmental Party (2013–present)
- Spouse: Kateřina Jacques (since 2015)
- Education: Charles University

Martin Bursík (born 12 August 1959) is a Czech politician. Bursík has twice served as Minister of the Environment and is also former chairman of the Green Party.

== Early life and education ==
In the 1980s, Bursík studied environmental engineering at the Charles University. In June 1989, he joined the dissident movement and signed the declaration of the anti-communist movement. During the Velvet Revolution in November 1989, he was one of the founders of the Civic Forum.

The Civic Movement, which emerged from the Civic Forum and would later become the Party for the Open Society, nominated him as vice-chairman and he was elected into parliament. After the breakup of the Civic Movement, Bursík switched to the Free Democrats. He served as the Minister of the Environment under Josef Tošovský for a few months in 1998.

Bursík unsuccessfully ran for mayor of Prague and joined the Christian Democrats but left this party in 2003.

He joined the Green Party in June 2004 and was elected party chairman. After 2006 parliament election he became a member of the Chamber of Deputies and was also appointed Minister of the Environment in the second cabinet of Prime Minister Mirek Topolánek.

His priority as Minister of the Environment was climate change.

As of 2014 he is a professor at New York University in Prague.

Preceded by Jiří Skalický	3rd Minister of the Environment of the Czech Republic; 1998	Succeeded by Miloš Kužvart
Preceded by Jan Beránek	Chairman of the Czech Green Party; 2005-2009	Succeeded by Ondřej Liška
Preceded by Petr Kalaš	7th Minister of the Environment of the Czech Republic; 2007-2009	Succeeded by Ladislav Miko
