= Green Party (Czech Republic) =

Czech political party

Green Party Strana zelených
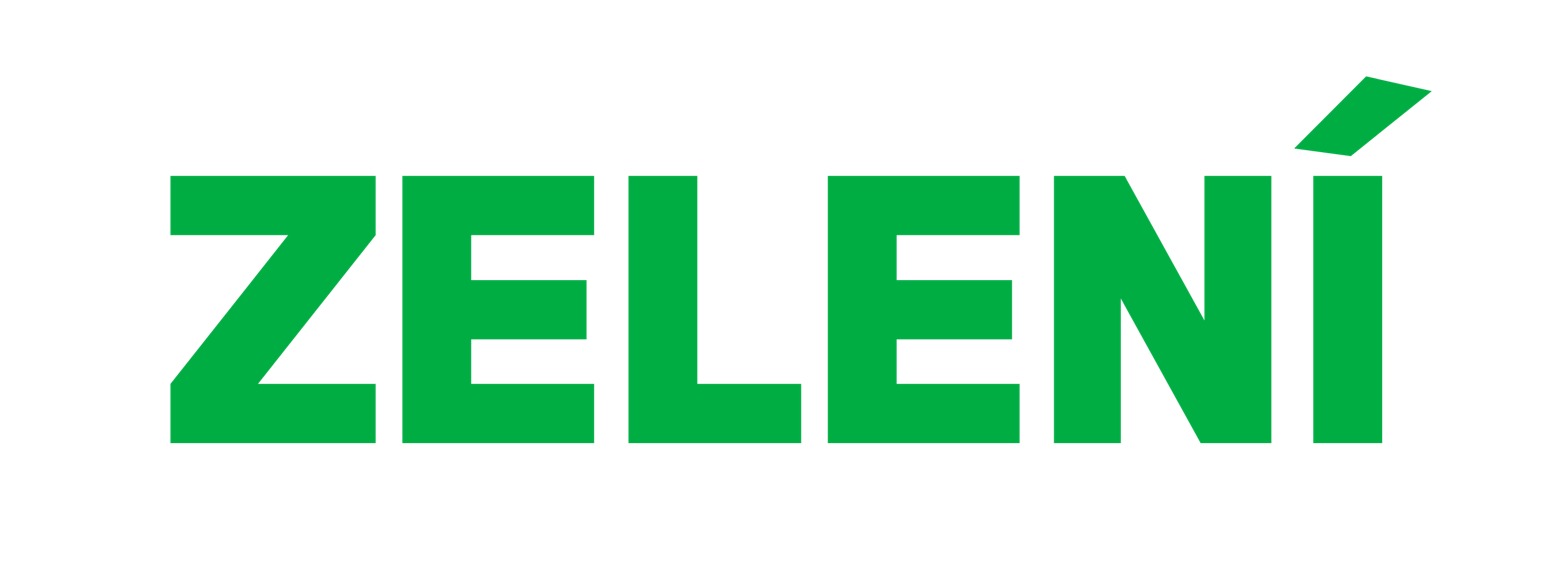
- Abbreviation: Greens; Zelení
- Leaders: Matěj Pomahač; Gabriela Svárovská
- Deputy Leaders: Jitka Kylišová; Tomáš Mígl
- Founded: 1990; 36 years ago
- Headquarters: Náměstí Hrdinů 1125/8; 140 00 Prague
- Youth wing: Young Greens (formerly)
- Membership (2019): 1,201
- Ideology: Green politics Social liberalism
- Political position: Centre-left
- National affiliation: Czech Pirate Party
- European affiliation: European Green Party
- International affiliation: Global Greens
- Colours: Green
- Chamber of Deputies: 2 / 200
- Senate: 0 / 81
- European Parliament: 0 / 21
- Regional assemblies: 1 / 675
- Local assemblies: 127 / 61,677

Website
- zeleni.cz

The Green Party (Czech: Strana zelených, lit. 'Party of Greens'), also known as the Greens (Czech: Zelení), is a green political party in the Czech Republic.

== History ==
The Green Party was founded in 1990 after the Velvet Revolution. However, the party remained on the political margins until Jaromír Štětina won a seat in the Czech Senate in 2004. At this time, the Greens campaigned on a platform of pacificism (rejecting the hosting of foreign military bases in the Czech Republic) and greater incorporation of grassroots democracy in the country.

Under new leader Martin Bursík, the Greens adopted a more pragmatic approach to politics, and in the 2006 legislative election won 6.3% of the vote and six seats in the Chamber of Deputies. The party joined the resulting governing coalition with the Civic Democrats (ODS) and KDU–ČSL from January 2007 to March 2009. While in government, the Greens promoted pro-European policies, such as supporting the Lisbon Treaty. They also suggested that a European defence alliance could be an alternative option to Czech membership of NATO. However, following the installation of a new U.S. radar system in the Czech Republic, tensions arose within the party over foreign policy. The party also supported minority rights, immigrant rights and gender rights. In the 2010 elections, the Green Party lost all its seats in both chambers.

In the party's 2022 leadership election, the incumbent co-leaders, Magdalena Davis and Michal Berg, were elected for another term.

In the party's November 2024 leadership election, Gabriela Svárovská and Matěj Pomahač were elected.

In June 2025, the party signed a cooperation agreement with the Czech Pirate Party, which will see around 30 Green Party candidates standing on Pirate Party candidate lists for the 2025 Czech parliamentary election.

== Policies ==
Some of the policies in the party's 2025 program include: more renewable energy, investment in public infrastructure, cheaper and more reliable public transport, ending state subsidies to fossil fuel oligarchs, lowering value-added tax (VAT) on basic and healthy foods, nappies, hygiene products and other necessities, tackling corruption, ensuring large companies pay their fair share of taxation, regulating cannabis, legalising same-sex marriage, and 200,000 new ecological homes for "ordinary people" with a mix of ownership types, including resident owned, cooperative, rental and municipal with extended state support.

== Election results ==
=== Chamber of Deputies of the Czech Republic ===
Year	Leader	Vote	Vote %	Seats	Place	Government
1990	Jan Martin Ječmínek	295,844	4.1	0 / 200	7th	No seats
1992	František Trnka	421,988	6.52	3 / 200	4th	Opposition
1992	Part of Liberal-Social Union, which won 16 seats in total					
1996	did not participate					
1998	Emil Zeman	67,143	1.12	0 / 200	9th	No seats
2002	Miroslav Rokos	112,929	2.36	0 / 200	6th	No seats
2006	Martin Bursík	336,487	6.29	6 / 200	5th	Opposition (2006–2007)
2006	Martin Bursík	336,487	6.29	6 / 200	5th	Coalition (2007–2009)
2006	Martin Bursík	336,487	6.29	6 / 200	5th	Coalition (2009–2010)
2010	Ondřej Liška	127,831	2.44	0 / 200	9th	No seats
2013	Ondřej Liška	159,025	3.19	0 / 200	8th	No seats
2017	Matěj Stropnický	74,335	1.46	0 / 200	11th	No seats
2021	Michal Berg & Magdalena Davis	53,334	0.99	0 / 200	10th	No seats
2025	Matěj Pomahač & Gabriela Svárovská	504,537	8.97	2 / 200	4th	Opposition
2025	Joint list with Pirates which won 18 seats					

=== Senate ===
- 1996 Senate: no seats
- 1998 Senate: no seats
- 2000 Senate: no seats
- 2002 Senate: no seats
- 2004 Senate: 1 seat (Jaromír Štětina)
- 2006 Senate: no seats
- 2008 Senate: no seats
- 2010 Senate: no seats
- 2012 Senate: 1 seat separately (Eliška Wagnerová) and 1 seat together with Pirates and KDU-ČSL (Libor Michálek)
- 2014 Senate by-election: 1 seat (Ivana Cabrnochová) together with Social Democrats
- 2014 Senate: 2 seats
- 2016 Senate: 1 seat, 1 together with Christian Democrats (Petr Orel) and 1 together with Pirates and local Prague movement HPP11 (Ladislav Kos)
- 2018 Senate: 1 seat
- 2020 Senate: 1 seat
- 2022 Senate: 0 seats
- 2024 Senate: 1 seat, 1 together with TOP 09, ODS and Pirates (Břetislav Rychlík)
- 2026 Senate: 0 seats

=== Presidential ===
Indirect Election	Candidate	First round result			Second round result			Third round result		
Indirect Election	Candidate	Votes	%Votes	Result	Votes	%Votes	Result	Votes	%Votes	Result
2008	Jan Švejnar	128	49.10	Runner-up	141	47.19	Runner-up	111	44.05	Lost

Direct Election	Candidate	First round result			Second round result		
Direct Election	Candidate	Votes	%Votes	Result	Votes	%Votes	Result
2013	Táňa Fischerová	166,211	3.23	7th	supported Karel Schwarzenberg		

=== European Parliament ===
Election	List leader	Votes	%	Seats	+/−	EP Group
2004	Unclear	73,932	3.16 (#7)	0 / 21	New	−
2009	Jan Dusík	48,621	2.06 (#9)	0 / 21	0	−
2014	Ondřej Liška	57,240	3.78 (#9)	0 / 21	0	−
2019 (Note: Run in a joint list with STAN, TOP 09 and LES.)	Jiří Pospíšil	276,220	11.65 (#4)	0 / 21	0	−
2024	Johanna Nejedlová	46,127	1.55 (#11)	0 / 21	0	−

== Logos ==
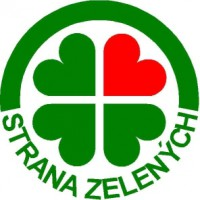
Until 2006

2006–2017

2017–2021

2021–2022

2022–2024

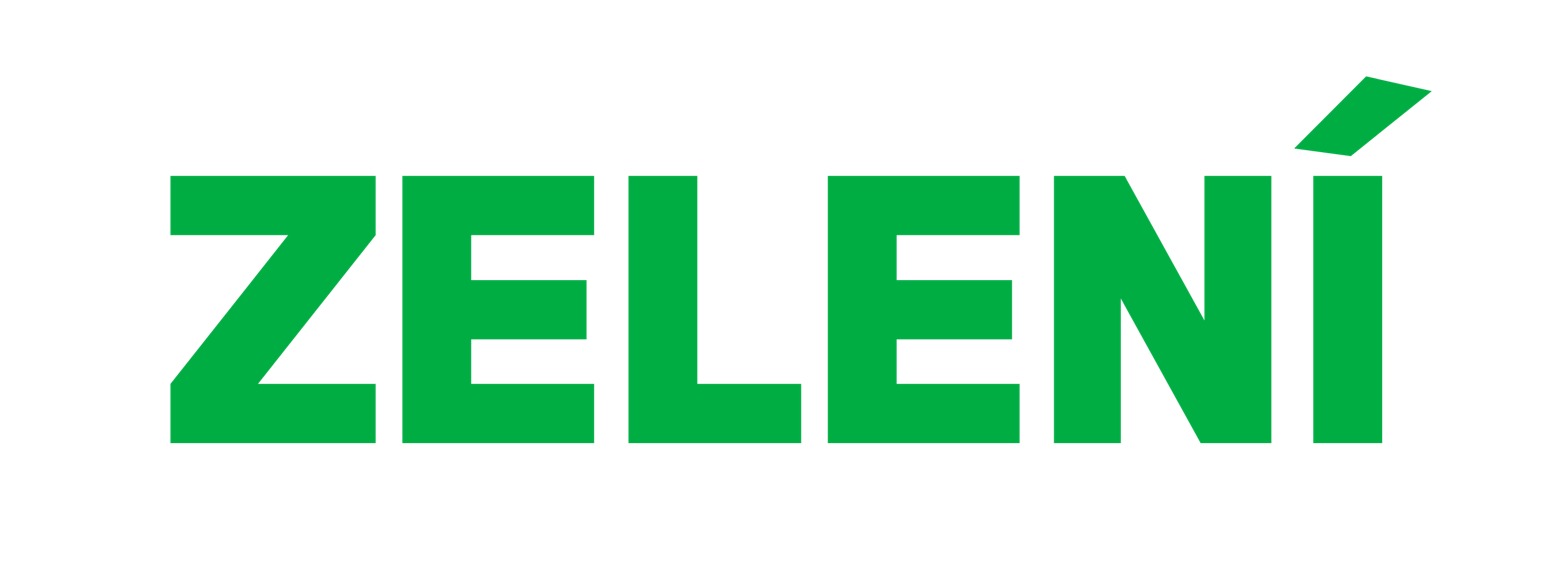
2024–present

== See also ==
- Green party
- Green politics
- List of environmental organizations
- Renewable energy in the Czech Republic
