= Senate district 39 – Trutnov =

Electoral district in the Czech Republic

39 – Trutnov
- inline Senate district of the Czech Republic

- The Trutnov district on a map
- Senator: Jan Sobotka; STAN
- Region: Hradec Králové
- District: Trutnov; Náchod
- Electorate: 116,702
- Area: 1,269.78 km²
- Last election: 2026
- Next election: 2032

Senate district 39 – Trutnov is an electoral district of the Senate of the Czech Republic, located in the entirety of the Trutnov District and parts of Náchod District. From 2018 onwards, Jan Sobotka, an Mayors and Independents nominee, is the Senator for the district.

== Senators ==
Year	Senator	Party
1996	Vlastimil Šubrt	ODS
2002	Ivan Adamec	ODS
2008	Pavel Trpák	ČSSD
2014	Jiří Hlavatý	ANO
2018	Jan Sobotka	STAN
2020	Jan Sobotka	STAN
2026	Jan Sobotka	STAN

== Election results ==
=== 1996 ===
1996 Czech Senate election in Trutnov
Candidate	Party	1st round		2nd round	
Candidate	Party	Votes	%	Votes	%
Vlastimil Šubrt	ODS	12 605	38,92	16 308	53,81
Vasil Biben	ČSSD	6 016	18,57	13 998	46,19
Vlastimil Prouza	KSČM	4 509	13,92	—	—
Ondřej Šik	ODA	2 883	8,90	—	—
Vladimír Wolf	ČSNS	1 881	5,81	—	—
Zdeněk Martinec	SŽJ	1 817	5,61	—	—
Jaroslav Pauer	NEZ	1 509	4,66	—	—
Jiří Buben	Independent	796	2,46	—	—
Jaroslav Jůzek	DEU	374	1,15	—	—

=== 2002 ===
2002 Czech Senate election in Trutnov
Candidate	Party	1st round		2nd round	
Candidate	Party	Votes	%	Votes	%
Ivan Adamec	ODS	10 597	44,42	17 854	57,05
Pavel Trpák	ČSSD	5 933	24,87	13 441	42,94
Petr Jandera	KSČM	4 063	17,13	—	—
Tomáš Paducha	US-DEU	3 260	13,66	—	—

=== 2008 ===
2008 Czech Senate election in Trutnov
Candidate	Party	1st round		2nd round	
Candidate	Party	Votes	%	Votes	%
Pavel Trpák	ČSSD	10 039	27,56	16 241	52,86
Ivan Adamec	ODS	11 169	30,67	14 483	47,13
Zbyněk Vobořil	Independent	5 270	14,47	—	—
Jan Sobotka	US-DEU, SOS, VPM	4 209	11,55	—	—
Jiří Gangur	KSČM	4 202	11,53	—	—
Jiří Kulich	SZ	1 525	4,18	—	—

=== 2014 ===
2014 Czech Senate election in Trutnov
Candidate	Party	1st round		2nd round	
Candidate	Party	Votes	%	Votes	%
Jiří Hlavatý	ANO 2011	12 945	34,39	11 563	63,94
Adolf Klepš	TOP 09, STAN	8 051	21,39	6 521	36,05
Pavel Trpák	ČSSD	4 848	12,88	—	—
Pavel Káňa	ODS	4 577	12,16	—	—
Slavomil Brádler	KSČM	2 615	6,94	—	—
Stanislav Penc	iČesko	2 186	5,80	—	—
Stanislav Rudolfský	HDP	1 742	4,62	—	—
Jaroslava Hamerková	SPO	670	1,78	—	—

=== 2018 ===
2018 Trutnov by-election
Candidate	Party	1st round		2nd round	
Candidate	Party	Votes	%	Votes	%
Jan Sobotka	STAN	7 615	33,52	30 331	67,12
Jiří Hlavatý	ANO 2011	5 728	25,21	14 859	32,88
Klára Sovová	NEI	2 700	11,88	—	—
Jaroslav Dvorský	Pirates	2 406	10,59	—	—
Iva Řezníčková	KSČM	1 612	7,10	—	—
Karel Šklíba	ČSSD	1 294	5,70	—	—
Luďka Tomešová	SPD	759	3,34	—	—
Blanka Horáková	ODA	455	2,00	—	—
Terezie Holovská	Independent	149	0,66	—	—

=== 2020 ===
2020 Czech Senate election in Trutnov
Candidate	Party	1st round		2nd round	
Candidate	Party	Votes	%	Votes	%
Jan Sobotka	STAN	14 839	41,71	12 140	74,58
Jan Jarolím	ANO 2011	9 345	26,26	4 137	25,41
Klára Sovová	ODS	8 142	22,88	—	—
Michal Slavka	SPD	3 250	9,13	—	—

=== 2026 ===
2026 Czech Senate election in Trutnov
Candidate	Party	1st round	
Candidate	Party	Votes	%
Jan Sobotka	STAN	23 174	58,42
Zuzana Chovancová	ANO 2011	11 350	28,61
Radek Mráz	SPD	2 903	7,31
Hynek Beran	PRO	2 235	5,63
