= 2020 Czech Senate election =

- 2–3 October 2020 (first round); 9–10 October 2020 (second round)

27 of the 81 seats in the Senate
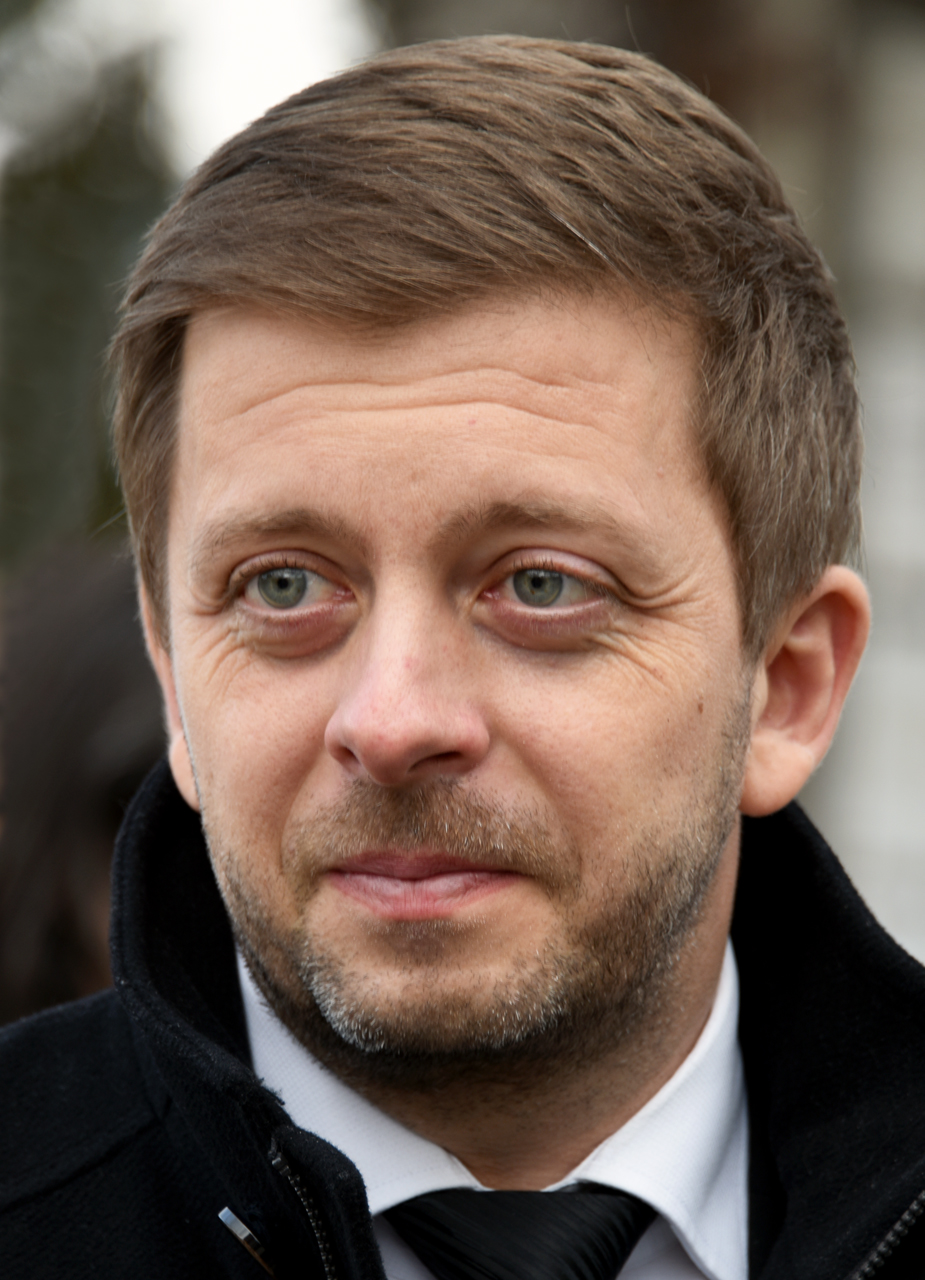

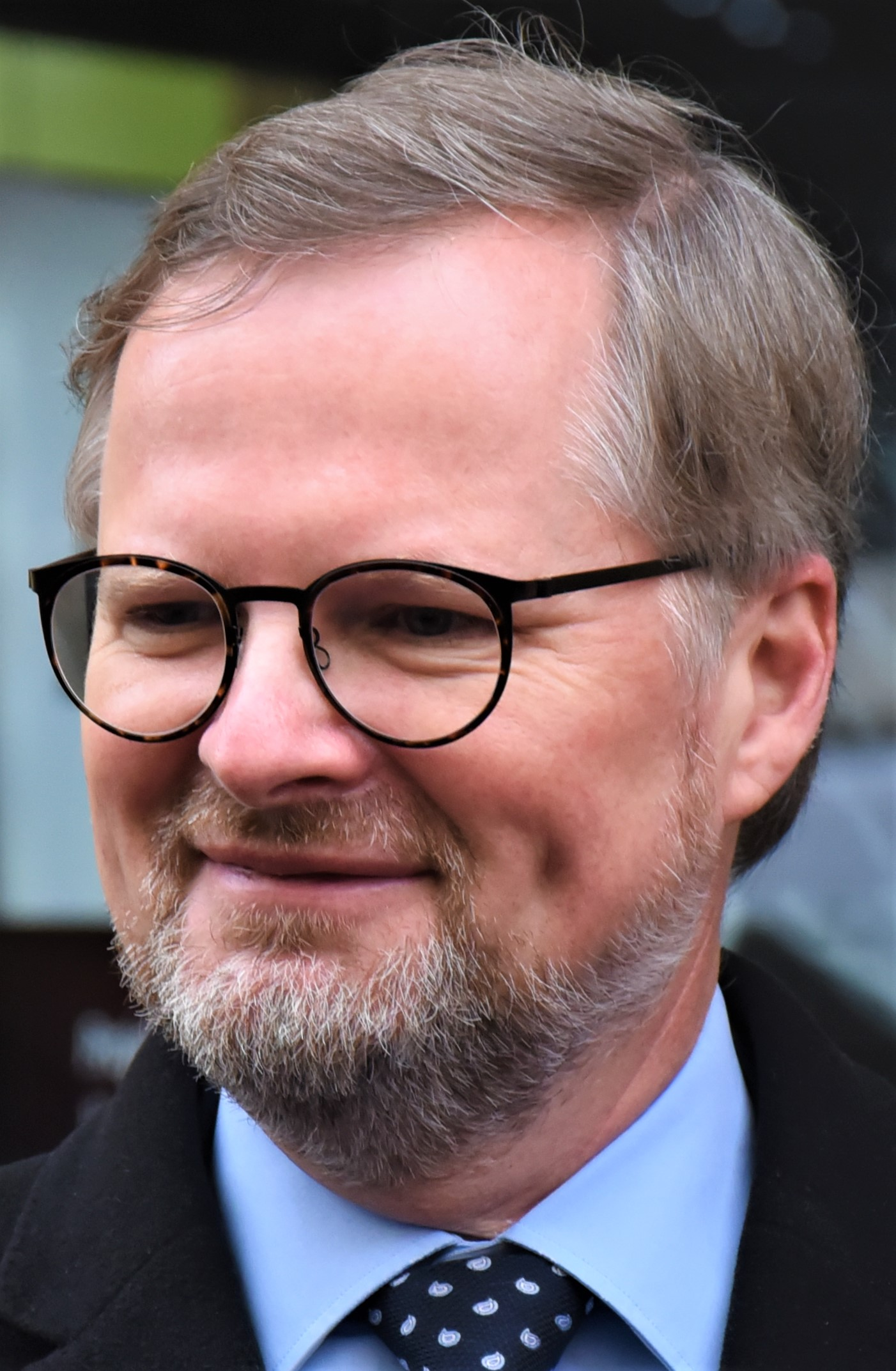

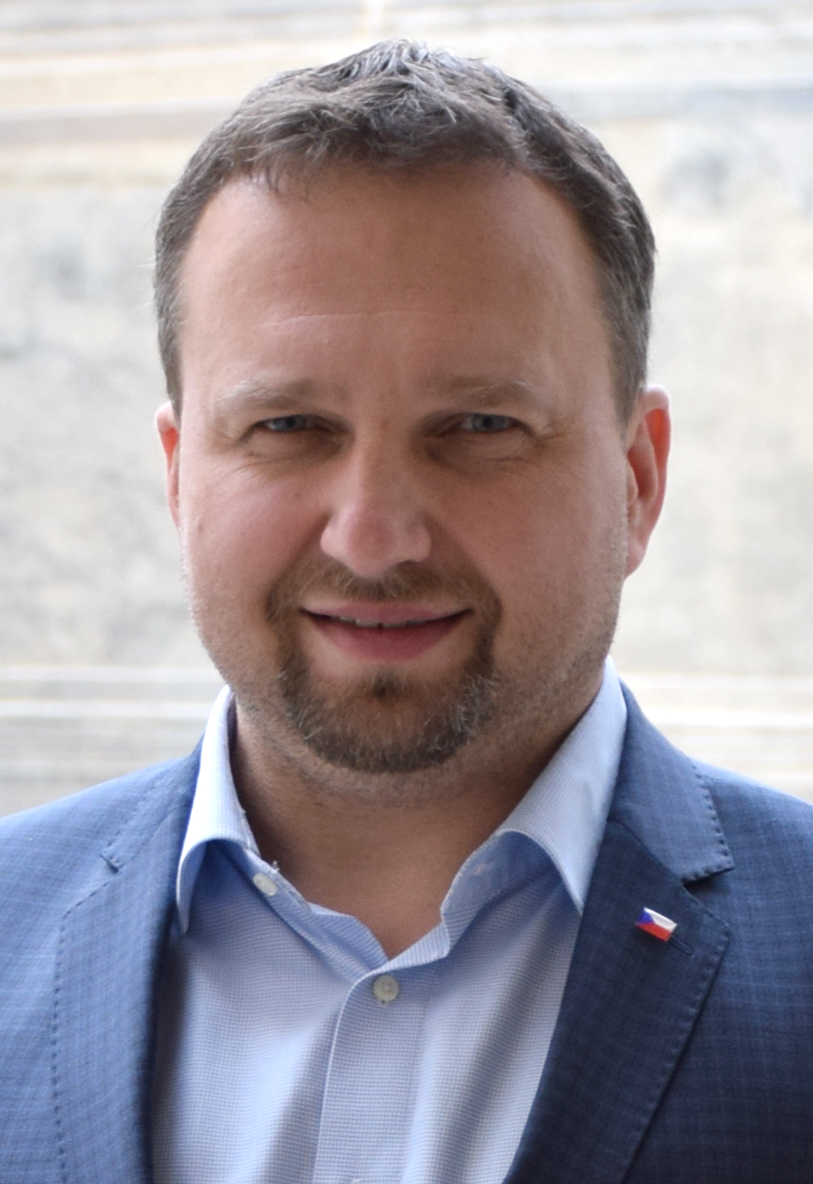

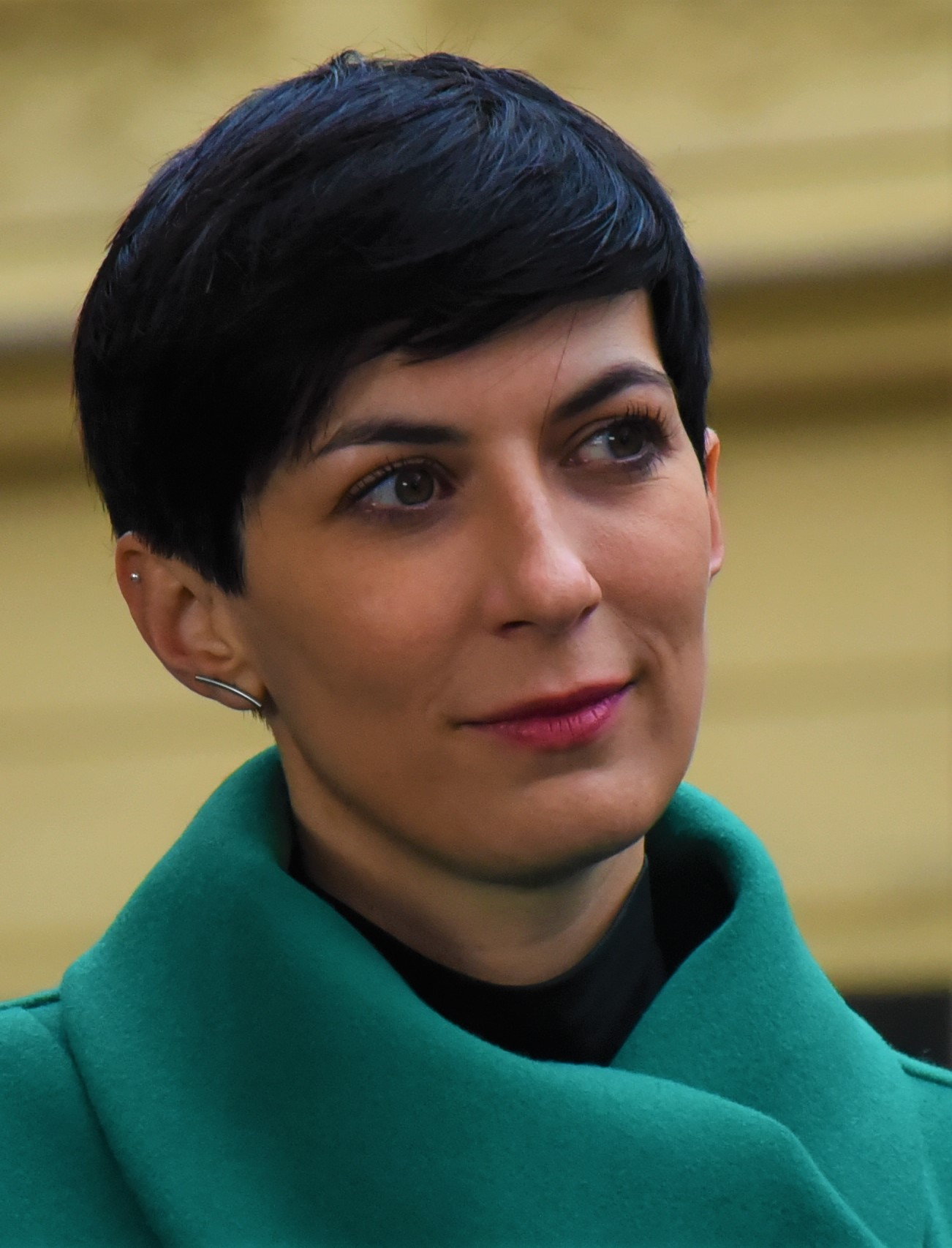

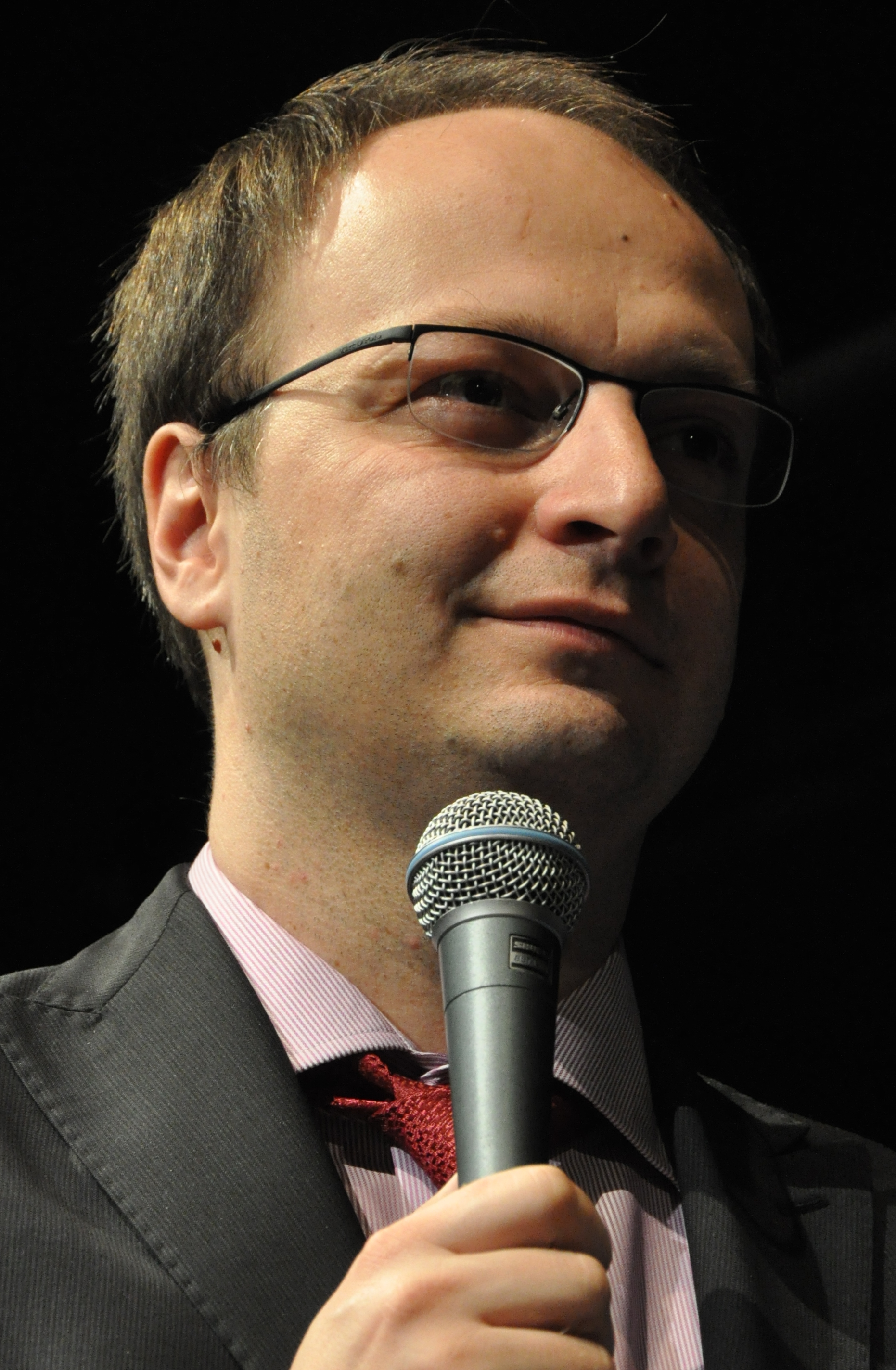

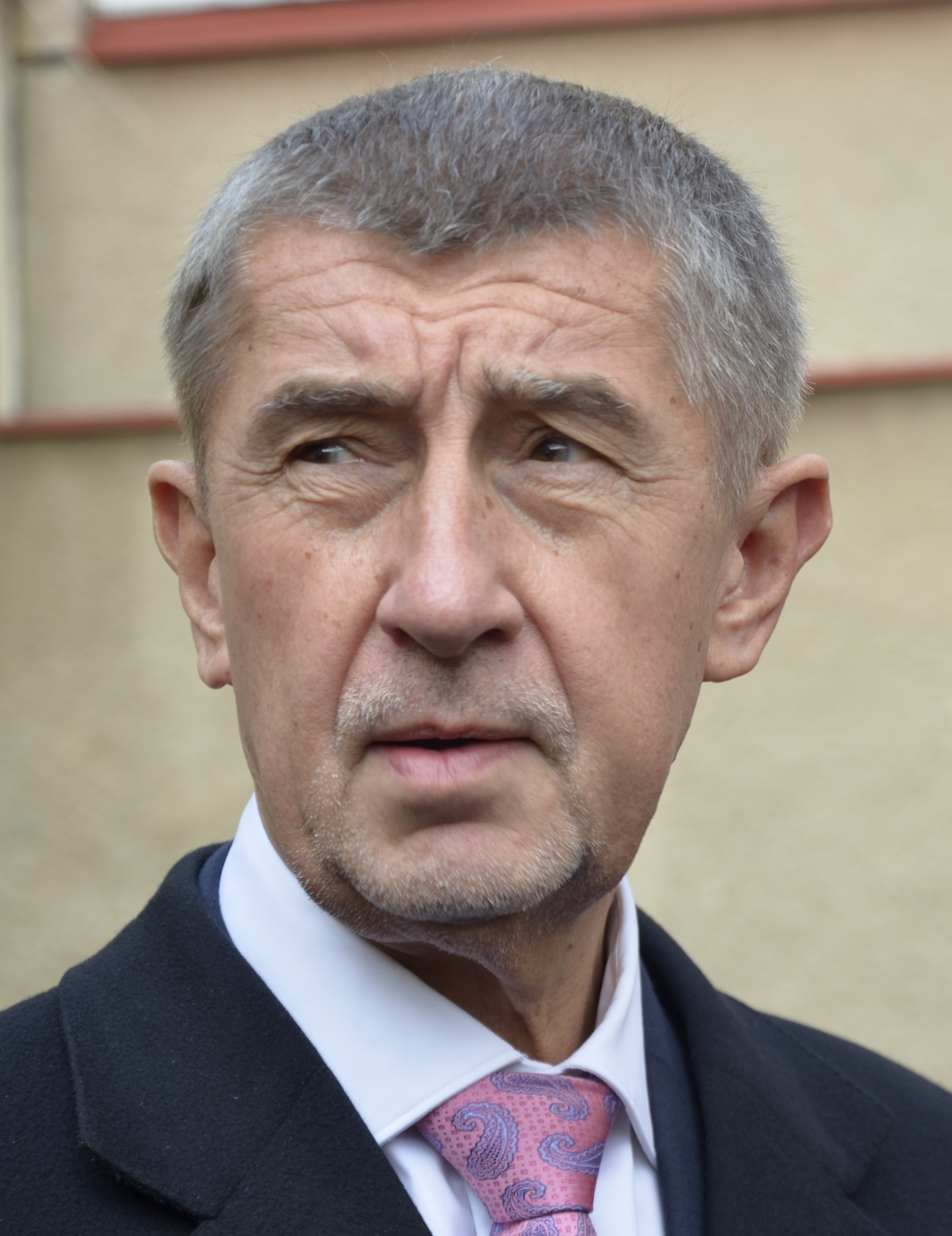
	First party	Second party	Third party
Leader	Vít Rakušan	Petr Fiala	Marian Jurečka
Party	STAN	ODS	KDU-ČSL
Seats won	10	5	3
First round	128,317; 12.87%	140,293; 14.07%	90,584; 9.08%
Second round	97,550; 21.59%	82,377; 18.23%	65,397; 14.47%
	Fourth party	Fifth party	Sixth party
Leader	Markéta Pekarová Adamová	Václav Láska	Andrej Babiš
Party	TOP 09	SEN 21	ANO
Seats won	2	2	1
First round	46,575; 4.67%	32,884; 3.30%	115,202; 11.55%
Second round	33,938; 7.51%	25,071; 5.55%	39,473; 8.74%
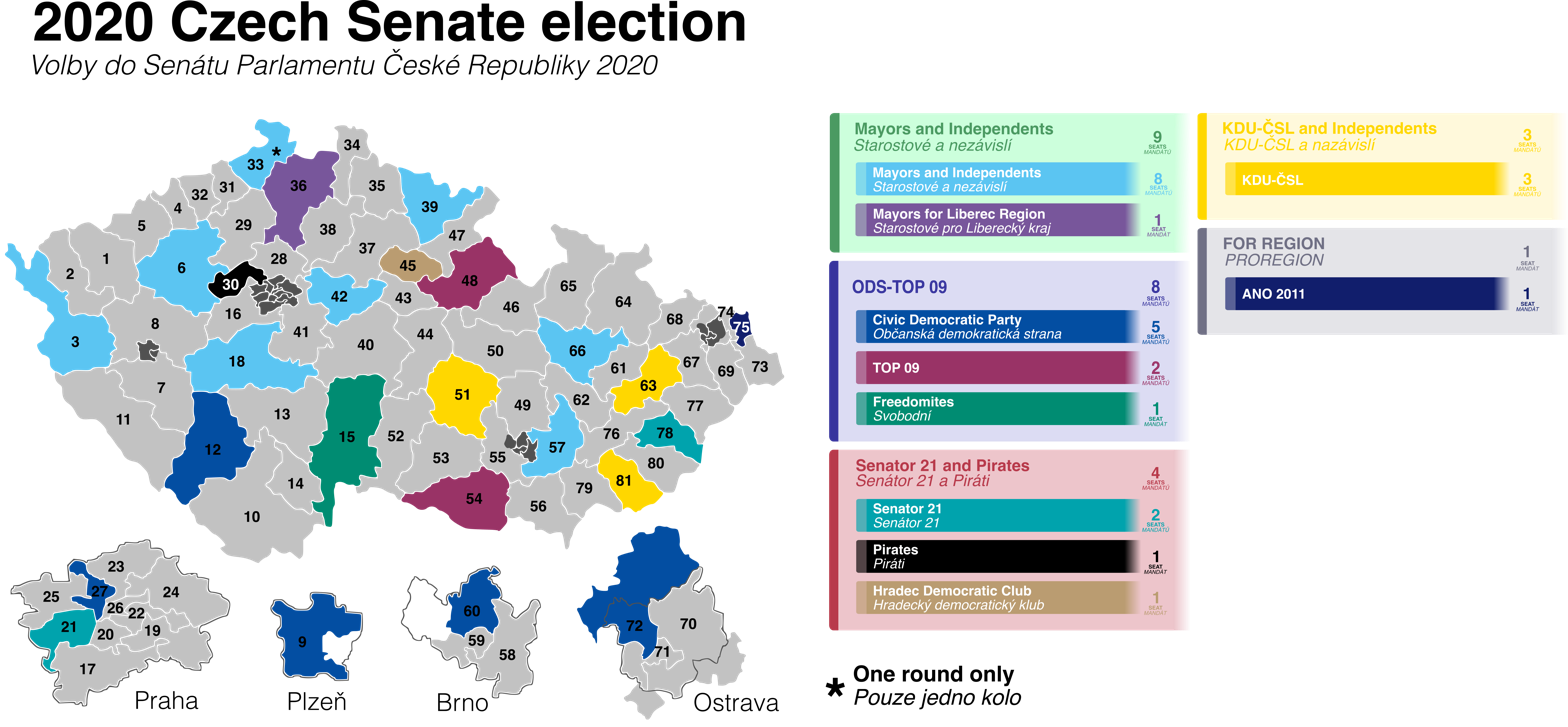

Senate elections were held in the Czech Republic on 2–3 October 2020 alongside regional elections, with second rounds on 9–10 October.

== Electoral system ==
One-third of the 81-member Senate is elected every two years, giving Senators six year terms. Members of the Senate are elected in single-member constituencies using the two-round system.

=== Composition of contested seats prior to the elections ===
Contested seats
Name	Ideology	Leader	Seats	Notes
Czech Social Democratic Party	Social democracy	Jan Hamáček	10 / 27	
KDU-ČSL	Christian democracy	Marian Jurečka	6 / 27	(Note: Includes Jitka Seitlová, who has previously been a Green Party candidate.)
Mayors and Independents	Localism	Vít Rakušan	4 / 27	(Note: Including Mayors for Liberec Region)
ANO 2011	Centrism	Andrej Babiš	2 / 27	
Civic Democratic Party	Conservatism	Petr Fiala	2 / 27	
Senator 21	Liberalism	Václav Láska	2 / 27	(Note: Includes Václav Láska, who has previously been a Green Party candidate.)
Freeholder Party of the Czech Republic	Conservatism	Petr Bajer	1 / 27	

== Districts ==
Elections were held in 27 districts:

- 3 – Cheb
- 6 – Louny
- 9 – Plzeň-City
- 12 – Strakonice
- 15 – Pelhřimov
- 18 – Příbram
- 21 – Prague 5
- 24 – Prague 9
- 27 – Prague 1
- 30 – Kladno
- 33 – Děčín
- 36 – Česká Lípa
- 39 – Trutnov
- 42 – Kolín
- 45 – Hradec Králové
- 48 – Rychnov nad Kněžnou
- 51 – Žďár nad Sázavou
- 54 – Znojmo
- 57 – Vyškov
- 60 – Brno-City
- 63 – Přerov
- 66 – Olomouc
- 69 – Frýdek-Místek
- 72 – Ostrava-City
- 75 – Karviná
- 78 – Zlín
- 81 – Uherské Hradiště

== Results ==
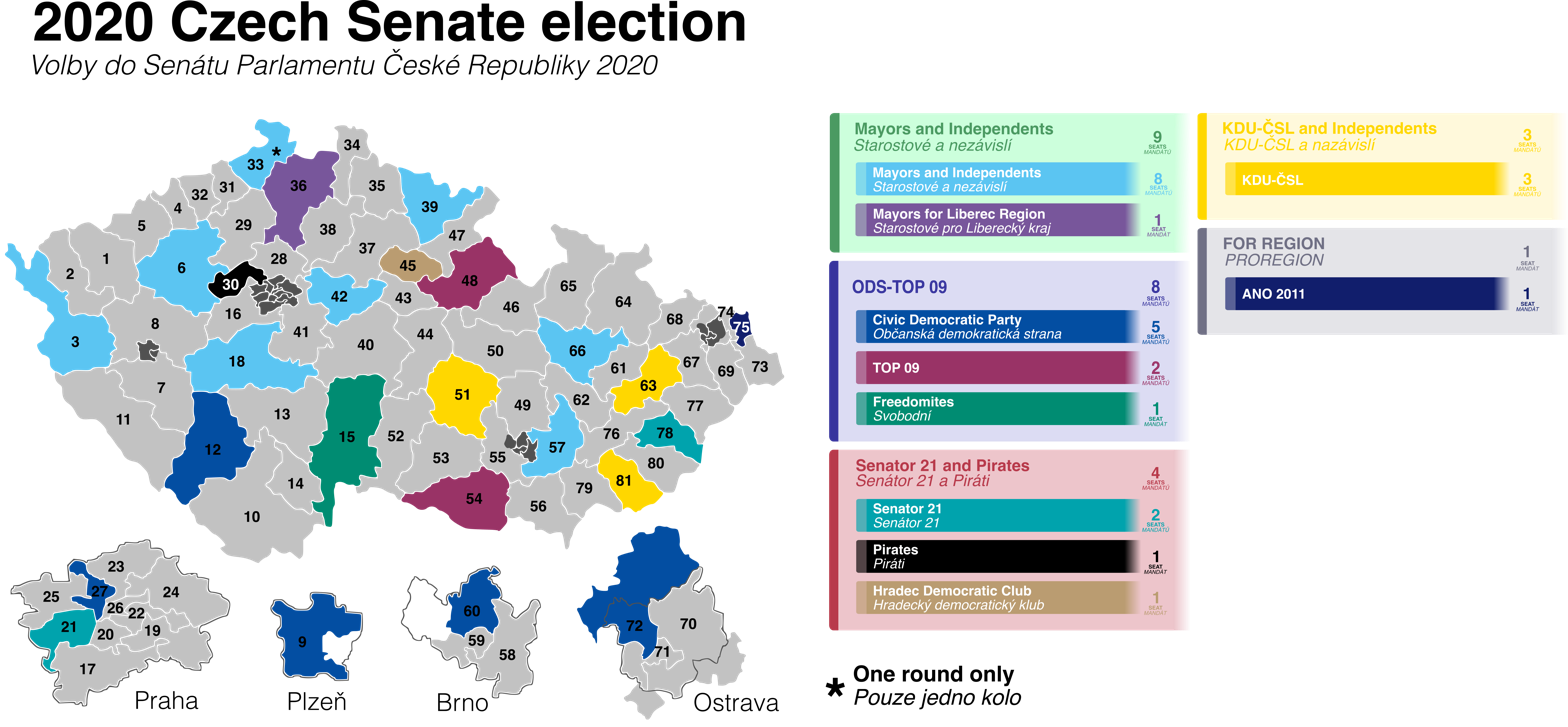
Constituencies in grey are those not up for election.

Nominating party	First round			Second round			Seats			
Nominating party	Votes	%	Seats	Votes	%	Seats	Won	Not up	Total	+/–
Civic Democratic Party	140,293	14.07	0	82,377	18.23	5	5	13	18	+2
Mayors and Independents	128,317	12.87	1	97,550	21.59	9	10	8	18	+8
ANO 2011	115,202	11.55	0	39,473	8.74	1	1	4	5	–2
KDU-ČSL	90,584	9.08	0	65,397	14.47	3	3	9	12	–4
Czech Social Democratic Party	81,105	8.13	0	18,175	4.02	0	0	3	3	–10
Czech Pirate Party	62,583	6.28	0	18,804	4.16	1	1	1	2	+1
Freedom and Direct Democracy	61,352	6.15	0				0	0	0	0
TOP 09	46,575	4.67	0	33,938	7.51	2	2	3	5	+2
Communist Party of Bohemia and Moravia	42,258	4.24	0				0	0	0	0
Senator 21	32,884	3.30	0	25,071	5.55	2	2	1	3	–3
Tricolour Citizens' Movement	27,239	2.73	0				0	0	0	New
Independents	17,244	1.73	0	7,479	1.66	0	0	0	0	0
Green Party	11,315	1.13	0	8,085	1.79	0	0	1	1	0
Freeholder Party of the Czech Republic	11,213	1.12	0	8,499	1.88	0	0	0	0	–1
Mayors for the Liberec Region	10,418	1.04	0	6,988	1.55	1	1	0	1	0
For the Citizens	10,275	1.03	0	7,733	1.71	0	0	0	0	New
Party of Free Citizens	9,297	0.93	0	8,433	1.87	1	1	0	1	+1
Mayors and Personalities for Moravia	7,778	0.78	0	8,723	1.93	0	0	0	0	New
Hradec Králové Democratic Club	7,445	0.75	0	15,138	3.35	1	1	0	1	New
Change 2020	7,056	0.71	0				0	0	0	New
Alternative for Independent Candidates	6,992	0.70	0				0	0	0	New
Independent Candidate	6,853	0.69	0				0	0	0	New
Czech Right	5,227	0.52	0				0	0	0	New
Good Choice 2016	4,260	0.43	0				0	0	0	New
Union for Sport and Health	3,910	0.39	0				0	0	0	New
Moravian Land Movement	2,970	0.30	0				0	0	0	0
Initiative of the Citizens	2,827	0.28	0				0	0	0	New
Choice for the Region	2,732	0.27	0				0	0	0	New
Reliance – Joint Movement of the Czech Republic	2,547	0.26	0				0	0	0	New
For Health and Sport	2,308	0.23	0				0	0	0	New
Písek to Itself	1,898	0.19	0				0	0	0	New
Severočeši.cz	1,645	0.16	0				0	1	1	New
Better North	1,153	0.12	0				0	0	0	New
WAY	1,107	0.11	0				0	0	0	New
Marek Hilšer for Senate	916	0.09	0				0	1	1	0
Nation for Itself	763	0.08	0				0	0	0	New
Independent Initiative	725	0.07	0				0	0	0	New
Unified – Alternative for Patriots	639	0.06	0				0	0	0	New
Democratic Party of Greens	508	0.05	0				0	0	0	New
Alliance of National Forces	257	0.03	0				0	0	0	0
Moravian and Silesian Pirate Party	236	0.02	0				0	0	0	0
Happy Czechia	236	0.02	0				0	0	0	New
Patriotic Citizens							–	1	1	0
Citizens Together – Independents							–	1	1	0
Movement for Prague 11							–	1	1	0
Ostravak							–	1	1	0
United Democrats – Association of Independents							–	1	1	0
Independents	26,119	2.62	0				0	4	4	0
Total	997,261	100.00	1	451,863	100.00	26	27	54	81	0
Valid votes	997,261	97.60		451,863	99.60					
Invalid/blank votes	24,527	2.40		1,812	0.40					
Total votes	1,021,788	100.00		453,675	100.00					
Registered voters/turnout	2,815,827	36.29		2,711,956	16.73					
Source: Volby.cz

== Transfer of seats ==
District	Before election		After election	
District	Party	Senator	Party	Senator
Cheb	ČSSD	Miroslav Nenutil	STAN	Miroslav Plevný
Kolín	ČSSD	Emilie Třísková	STAN	Pavel Kárník
Vyškov	ČSSD	Ivo Bárek	STAN	Karel Zitterbart
Rychnov nad Kněžnou	ČSSD	Miroslav Antl	TOP 09	Jan Grulich
Znojmo	ČSSD	Pavel Štohl	TOP 09	Tomáš Třetina
Karviná	ČSSD	Radek Sušil	ANO	Ondřej Feber
Strakonice	ČSSD	Karel Kratochvíle	ODS	Tomáš Fiala
Kladno	ČSSD	Jiří Dienstbier Jr.	Pirates	Adéla Šípová
Pelhřimov	ČSSD	Milan Štěch	Freedomites	Jaroslav Chalupský
Hradec Králové	ČSSD	Jaroslav Malý	HDK	Jan Holásek
Žďár nad Sázavou	KDU-ČSL	František Bradáč	KDU-ČSL	Josef Klement
Přerov	KDU-ČSL	Jitka Seitlová	KDU-ČSL	Jitka Seitlová
Prague 1	KDU-ČSL	Václav Hampl	ODS	Miroslava Němcová
Brno-City	KDU-ČSL	Zdeněk Papoušek	ODS	Roman Kraus
Olomouc	KDU-ČSL	Alena Šromová	STAN	Marek Ošťádal
Frýdek-Místek	KDU-ČSL	Jiří Carbol	STAN	Helena Pešatová
Prague 9	STAN	David Smoljak	STAN	David Smoljak
Děčín	STAN	Zbyněk Linhart	STAN	Zbyněk Linhart
Česká Lípa	SLK	Jiří Vosecký	SLK	Jiří Vosecký
Trutnov	STAN	Jan Sobotka	STAN	Jan Sobotka
Louny	ANO	Zdeňka Hamousová	STAN	Ivo Trešl
Ostrava-City	ANO	Peter Koliba	ODS	Ondřej Šimetka
Plzeň-City	ODS	Lumír Aschenbrenner	ODS	Lumír Aschenbrenner
Příbram	ODS	Jiří Burian	STAN	Petr Štěpánek
Prague 5	SEN 21	Václav Láska	SEN 21	Václav Láska
Zlín	SEN 21	Tomáš Goláň	SEN 21	Tomáš Goláň
Uherské Hradiště	Freeholders	Ivo Valenta	KDU-ČSL	Josef Bazala
