= Fuksa =

Fuksa (feminine: Fuksová) is a Czech surname. It is derived from the German word Fuchs ('fox') and the German surname Fuchs. Notable people with the surname include:

- Ivan Fuksa (born 1963), Czech politician
- Martin Fuksa (born 1993), Czech canoeist
- Petr Fuksa (born 1969), Czech canoeist
- Petr Fuksa Jr. (born 1998), Czech canoeist
