= Senate district 9 – Plzeň-City =

Electoral district in the Czech Republic

Coordinates: 49°44′23″N 13°22′19″E

9 – Plzeň-City
- inline Senate district of the Czech Republic

- The Plzeň-City district on a map
- Senator: Karel Řehka; STAN
- Region: Plzeň
- District: Plzeň-City
- Electorate: 101491
- Area: 119.14 km²
- Last election: 2026
- Next election: 2032

Senate district 9 – Plzeň-City is an electoral district of the Senate of the Czech Republic, consisting of parts of the Plzeň-City District. Since 2026, Karel Řehka, a STAN nominee, is the Senator for the district.

== Senators ==
Year	Senator	Party
1996	Bohumil Kulhánek	ODS
2002	Richard Sequens	US-DEU
2008	Jiří Bis	ČSSD
2014	Lumír Aschenbrenner	ODS
2020	Lumír Aschenbrenner	ODS
2026	Karel Řehka	STAN

== Election results ==
=== 1996 ===
1996 Czech Senate election in Plzeň-City
Candidate	Party	1st round		2nd round	
Candidate	Party	Votes	%	Votes	%
Bohumil Kulhánek	ODS	19 719	49,09	24 077	62,38
Josef Průša	ČSSD	8 426	20,98	14 523	37,62
Miroslav Pihrt	KSČM	4 070	10,13	—	—
Pavel Stelzer	ODA	3 781	9,41	—	—
František Pillmann	Independent	1 816	4,52	—	—
Drahomíra Šťáralová	SŽJ	1 616	4,02	—	—
Josef Tvrzký	SZ	737	1,83	—	—

=== 2002 ===
2002 Czech Senate election in Plzeň-City
Candidate	Party	1st round		2nd round	
Candidate	Party	Votes	%	Votes	%
Richard Sequens	US-DEU	12 629	46,95	22 570	74,02
Zdeněk Prosek	ODS	6 383	23,73	7 921	25,97
Jana Bystřická	KSČM	4 991	18,55	—	—
Jiří Samek	ČSSD	2 892	10,75	—	—

=== 2008 ===
2008 Czech Senate election in Plzeň-City
Candidate	Party	1st round		2nd round	
Candidate	Party	Votes	%	Votes	%
Jiří Bis	ČSSD	10 694	26,58	16 795	52,97
Zdeněk Rokyta	ODS	10 975	27,28	14 906	47,02
Richard Sequens	SOS	9 830	24,44	—	—
Jiří Valenta	KSČM	5 669	14,09	—	—
Vladimír Líbal	SZ	2 135	5,30	—	—
Oldřich Kodeda	KČ	917	2,27	—	—

=== 2014 ===
2014 Czech Senate election in Plzeň-City
Candidate	Party	1st round		2nd round	
Candidate	Party	Votes	%	Votes	%
Lumír Aschenbrenner	ODS, KČ	7 783	24,72	8 885	54,26
Václav Šimánek	ČSSD	6 737	21,40	7 489	45,73
Miloslava Rutová	ANO 2011	6 012	19,09	—	—
Ladislav Cabada	TOP 09, STAN	4 612	14,65	—	—
Karel Kvit	KSČM	2 820	8,95	—	—
Petr Rybář	KDU-ČSL	1 597	5,07	—	—
Jiřina Holotová	Dawn	1 214	3,85	—	—
Michal Drabík	APPlzeň.cz	702	2,23	—	—

=== 2020 ===
2020 Czech Senate election in Plzeň-City
Candidate	Party	1st round		2nd round	
Candidate	Party	Votes	%	Votes	%
Lumír Aschenbrenner	ODS, TOP 09, KDU-ČSL, ADS, KČ	13 151	34,93	8 425	59,33
Daniel Kůs	Pirates	8 032	21,33	5 773	40,66
Jindřich Sitta	STAN	6 175	16,40	—	—
Jiří Liška	ČSSD	3 766	10,00	—	—
Oldřich Fencl	SPD	3 481	9,24	—	—
Václav Heřman	KSČM	3 034	8,06	—	—

=== 2026 ===
2026 Czech Senate election in Plzeň-City
Candidate	Party	1st round		2nd round	
Candidate	Party	Votes	%	Votes	%
Karel Řehka	STAN	12 611	32,86	15 998	59.37
Lucie Kantorová	ANO 2011	10 463	27,26	10 944	40.62
Lumír Aschenbrenner	ODS, TOP 09, KČ	12 611	20,10	—	—
Daniela Pousková	Pro Plzeň	3 043	7,92	—	—
Július Liška	SPD	1 845	4,80	—	—
Jiří Valenta	KSČM	1 181	3,07	—	—
Bohumír Janský	SEN 21, Pirates	1 106	2,88	—	—
Jaroslav Novák	JaSaN	412	1,07	—	—
