= Senate district 42 – Kolín =

Electoral district in the Czech Republic

42 – Kolín
- inline Senate district of the Czech Republic

- The Kolín district on a map
- Senator: Pavel Kárník; STAN
- Region: Central Bohemia
- District: Kolín; Nymburk; Prague-East
- Electorate: 118,159
- Area: 998.61 km²
- Last election: 2020
- Next election: 2026

Senate district 42 – Kolín is an electoral district of the Senate of the Czech Republic, located in the entirety of the Kolín District and parts of Nymburk and Prague-East districts. From 2020 onwards, Pavel Kárník, an Mayors and Independents nominee, is the Senator for the district.

== Senators ==
Year	Senator	Party
1996	Vladislav Malát	ODS
2002	Jan Rakušan	ČSSD
2008	Pavel Lebeda	ČSSD
2014	Emilie Třísková	ČSSD
2020	Pavel Kárník	STAN
2026	Michael Kašpar	STAN

== Election results ==
=== 1996 ===
1996 Czech Senate election in Kolín
Candidate	Party	1st round		2nd round	
Candidate	Party	Votes	%	Votes	%
Vladislav Malát	ODS	13 677	35,82	19 464	55,28
Karel Vízner	ČSSD	7 600	19,90	15 749	44,72
František Švarc	KSČM	6 287	16,46	—	—
Václav Mezřický	ODA	5 861	15,35	—	—
Luděk Rubáš	Independent	4 288	11,23	—	—
Jiří Dušek	RSZML	473	1,24	—	—

=== 2002 ===
2002 Czech Senate election in Kolín
Candidate	Party	1st round		2nd round	
Candidate	Party	Votes	%	Votes	%
Jan Rakušan	ČSSD	6 270	25,46	20 498	60,91
Vladislav Malát	ODS	5 717	23,22	13 150	39,08
František Švarc	KSČM	4 363	17,72	—	—
Zdenka Majerová	SNK	3 801	15,43	—	—
Jiří Otta	Independent	2 764	11,22	—	—
Jan Černý	US-DEU	1 704	6,92	—	—

=== 2008 ===
2008 Czech Senate election in Kolín
Candidate	Party	1st round		2nd round	
Candidate	Party	Votes	%	Votes	%
Pavel Lebeda	ČSSD	11 060	25,53	20 489	56,96
Jiří Buřič	ODS	10 655	24,60	13 679	40,03
Václav Navrátil	SNK ED	8 730	20,15	—	—
František Švarc	KSČM	6 724	15,52	—	—
Robert Drda	SZ	2 821	6,51	—	—
Jan Černý	US-DEU	1 575	3,63	—	—
Jaroslav Němeček	HNPD	800	1,84	—	—
Jiří Zub	ČSNS 2005, SZR	647	1,49	—	—
Jiří Hanzlíček	SDŽ	301	0,69	—	—

=== 2014 ===
2014 Czech Senate election in Kolín
Candidate	Party	1st round		2nd round	
Candidate	Party	Votes	%	Votes	%
Emilie Třísková	ČSSD	11 111	26,11	10 027	56,24
Milan Rak	ODS	7 828	18,39	7 799	43,75
Pavel Kárník	TOP 09, STAN	7 143	16,78	—	—
Regina Davídková	ANO 2011	6 779	15,93	—	—
František Švarc	KSČM	4 750	11,16	—	—
Roman Škrabánek	Dawn	3 787	8,90	—	—
Pavel Lebeda	Republika	1 149	2,70	—	—

=== 2020 ===
2020 Czech Senate election in Kolín
Candidate	Party	1st round		2nd round	
Candidate	Party	Votes	%	Votes	%
Pavel Kárník	STAN	8 971	20,05	15 197	79,48
Igor Karen	ANO 2011	6 627	14,81	3 923	20,51
Michal Zapletal	ODS	6 451	14,41	—	—
Emilie Třísková	Independent	5 295	11,83	—	—
Tomáš Klinecký	TOP 09, Hlas, Greens	4 603	10,28	—	—
Cyril Koky	Pirates	4 173	9,32	—	—
Petr Žantovský	SPD	2 515	5,62	—	—
Martin Škorpík	KSČM	2 186	4,88	—	—
Ivanka Kohoutová	Tricolour	1 630	3,64	—	—
Karel Otava	ČSSD	1 195	2,67	—	—
Jiří Otta	Independent	1 091	2,43	—	—

=== 2026 ===
2026 Czech Senate election in Kolín
Candidate	Party	1st round		2nd round	
Candidate	Party	Votes	%	Votes	%
Michael Kašpar	STAN	23 018	45,26	18 899	73,24
Andrea Brzobohatá	ANO 2011	12 988	25,54	6 905	26,75
Roman Schulz	ODS, TOP 09	8 773	17,25	—	—
Antonín Dušek	SPD	2 135	4,19	—	—
Pavel Sehnal	APB	2 108	4,14	—	—
Jiří Rynekr	KSČM	1 193	2,34	—	—
František Třeštik	JaSaN	632	1,24	—	—
