= Senate district 18 – Příbram =

Electoral district in the Czech Republic

Coordinates: 49°43′22″N 14°12′34″E

18 – Příbram
- inline Senate district of the Czech Republic

- The Příbram district on a map
- Senator: Petr Štěpánek; Mayors and Independents
- Region: South Bohemian
- District: Příbram; Benešov; Prague-West
- Electorate: 118927
- Area: 2,048.24 km²
- Last election: 2026
- Next election: 2032

Senate district 18 – Příbram is an electoral district of the Senate of the Czech Republic, containing whole of the Příbram District and parts of the Benešov and Prague-West districts. From 2020, Petr Štěpánek a Mayors and Independents member, is the Senator for the district.

== Senators ==
Year	Senator	Party
1996	Zdeněk Vojíř	ČSSD
2002	Jaromír Volný	ODS
2008	Josef Řihák	ČSSD
2014	Jiří Burian	ODS
2020	Petr Štěpánek	STAN
2026	Petr Štěpánek	STAN

== Election results ==
1996 Czech Senate election in Příbram
Candidate	Party	1st round		2nd round	
Candidate	Party	Votes	%	Votes	%
Zdeněk Vojíř	ČSSD	6 866	21,71	16 249	52,85
Andrej Gjurič	ODS	9 406	29,74	14 499	47,15
František Vácha	KDU-ČSL	5 663	17,91	—	—
Jan Novák	KSČM	4 865	15,38	—	—
Tomáš Sokol	ČSNS	2 353	7,44	—	—
Jiří Slanec	Independent	830	2,62	—	—
Miroslav Uher	Independent	569	1,80	—	—
Naděžda Kubínová	SZ	563	1,78	—	—
Lidmila Ripová	MDS	510	1,61	—	—

=== 2002 ===
2002 Czech Senate election in Příbram
Candidate	Party	1st round		2nd round	
Candidate	Party	Votes	%	Votes	%
Jaromír Volný	ODS	8 334	35,46	17 175	55,67
Zdeněk Vojíř	ČSSD	5 794	24,65	13 671	44,32
Antonín Bartoň	KSČM	5 404	22,99	—	—
Josef Vacek	KDU-ČSL	3 964	16,87	—	—

=== 2008 ===
2008 Czech Senate election in Příbram
Candidate	Party	1st round		2nd round	
Candidate	Party	Votes	%	Votes	%
Josef Řihák	ČSSD	15 010	35,07	20 971	62,57
Jaromír Volný	ODS	9 661	22,57	12 543	37,42
Jiřina Humlová	KSČM	5 943	13,88	—	—
Josef Vacek	KDU-ČSL	3 131	7,31	—	—
Vladimír Kyselák	Independent	2 260	5,28	—	—
Martin Bartoš	SZR	2 169	5,06	—	—
Alena Šálová	SZ	2 128	4,97	—	—
Vladimír Kříž	US-DEU	2 121	4,95	—	—
Pavel Jánský	SDŽ	366	0,85	—	—

=== 2014 ===
2014 Czech Senate election in Příbram
Candidate	Party	1st round		2nd round	
Candidate	Party	Votes	%	Votes	%
Jiří Burian	ODS	9 146	19,36	9 387	53,46
Vladimír Danda	ANO	9 932	21,02	8 170	46,53
Josef Řihák	ČSSD	8 926	18,89	—	—
Václav Švenda	TOP 09, STAN	7 694	16,29	—	—
Josef Hála	KSČM	6 542	13,85	—	—
Karel Beneš	Svobodní	2 604	5,51	—	—
Martin Bartoš	Úsvit, Hora 2014	2 387	5,05	—	—

=== 2020 ===
2020 Czech Senate election in Pelhřimov
Candidate	Party	1st round		2nd round	
Candidate	Party	Votes	%	Votes	%
Petr Štěpánek	STAN	9 646	21,98	11 372	70,18
Jiří Burian	ODS	7 109	16,19	4 831	29,81
Stanislav Holobrada	ČSSD	7 038	16,13	—	—
Simona Luftová	Pirates	6 763	15,41	—	—
Václav Švenda	TOP 09	5 178	11,79	—	—
Jindřich Havelka	KSČM	3 337	7,60	—	—
Jiří Novotný	SPD	2 770	6,31	—	—
Jiřina Rosáková	Greens, SEN 21	1 999	4,55	—	—

=== 2026 ===
2026 Czech Senate election in Pelhřimov
Candidate	Party	1st round		2nd round	
Candidate	Party	Votes	%	Votes	%
Petr Štěpánek	STAN	23 305	43,70	19 020	74,25
Barbora Daňhová	ANO 2011	13 446	25,21	6 593	25,74
Simona Luftová	Pirates	6 436	12,07	—	—
Josef Šorna	PRO, SPD	5 013	9,40	—	—
Frank Thomas Podstatzky-Lichtenstein	ČZS	3 106	5,82	—	—
Pavel Vermach	SMS	2 014	3,77	—	—
