= 2012 Civic Democratic Party leadership election =

Czech political party leadership election

- Turnout: 89.4%
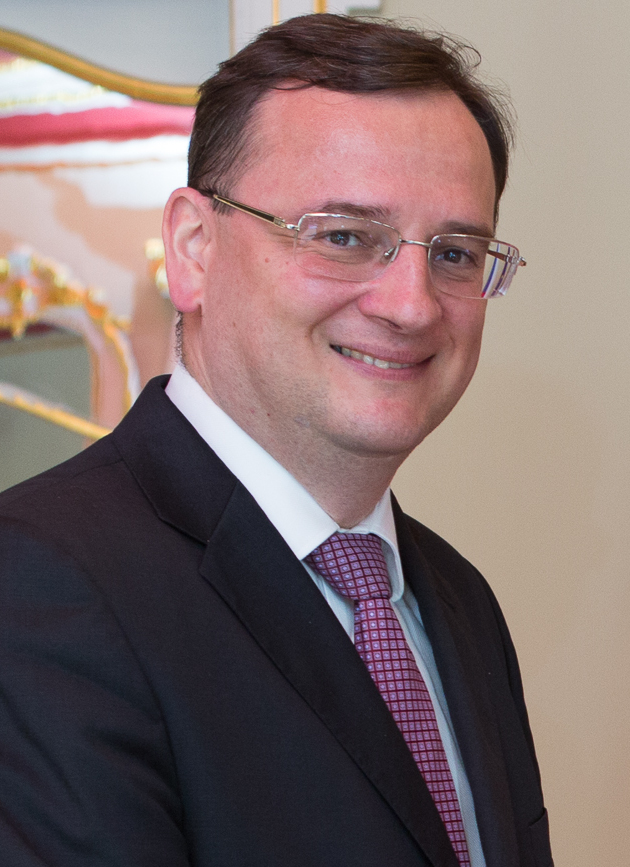

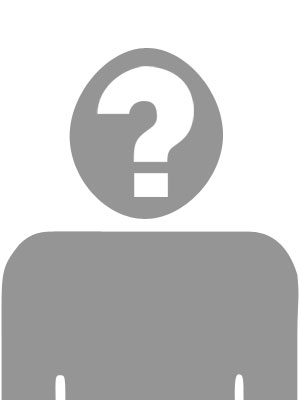
Nominee	Petr Nečas	Ivan Fuksa
Party	ODS	ODS
Electoral vote	351	178
Percentage	66.4%	33.6%
Leader of ODS before election
Petr Nečas
Elected Leader of ODS
Petr Nečas

The Civic Democratic Party (ODS) leadership election of 2012 was a part of party's congress. Incumbent leader and Prime Minister Petr Nečas sought re-election. Nečas faced Ivan Fuksa who announced his candidacy only a day prior the election.

592 delegates were allowed to vote. Nečas received 351 votes and thus won the election. Fuksa received only 178 votes.
