= Viktor Kožený =

Czech-born fugitive financier (born 1963)

- Born: 28 June 1963 (age 63); Prague, Czechoslovakia
- Citizenship: Irish
- Education: Harvard University (self-reported)
- Occupation: Businessman
- Organization(s): Harvard Capital and Consulting
- Known for: Voucher privatization, fraud conviction

Viktor Kožený (born 28 June 1963) is a Czech-born investment fund founder and financier best known for his role in the voucher privatization of Czechoslovakia and the Czech Republic in the early 1990s. After returning to Czechoslovakia in 1990, he founded Harvard Capital and Consulting and a group of investment funds that became major participants in the privatization programme. Their advertising campaign promised investors a tenfold return on their vouchers and attracted hundreds of thousands of participants.

The Harvard funds were later reorganized into Harvardský průmyslový holding (HPH) and Kožený was subsequently prosecuted over the handling and transfer of the group's assets. In 2010, he was convicted of fraud and sentenced to ten years in prison and odered to pay about CZK 8.3 billion in compensation to HPH.

Kožený also became also involved in investments connected with the proposed privatization of Azerbaijan's state oil company, SOCAR. In 2005, United States prosecutors indicted him over an alleged scheme to bribe Azerbaijani officials in connection with the privatization. He was arrested in the Bahamas later that year, but attempts to extradite him to the United States were unsuccessful. He remained in the Bahamas and was reported in 2024 to still be wanted by Czech and U.S. authorities. In September 2026, according to Czech media, Kožený was hospitalized with brain damage in a long-term care facility in the Bahamas, likely due to a stroke. Senator Václav Láska confirmed the information regarding Kožený's long-term hospitalization.

== Early life and career ==
Kožený was born on 28 June 1963 in Prague, then part of Czechoslovakia. In 1979, he emigrated with his parents to West Germany and later moved to the United States.

Kožený worked briefly in London for the investment bank Robert Fleming & Co., where he was involved in privatization projects, before returning to Czechoslovakia in April 1990.

== Harvard Funds and voucher privatization ==
After returning to Czechoslovakia following the fall of communism, Kožený founded Harvard Capital and Consulting, an investment company unrelated to Harvard University. During the first wave of voucher privatization, the company established a group of investment funds that encouraged citizens to entrust their privatization vouchers. Harvard's advertising campaign promised investors a tenfold return on the value of their vouchers and helped make the funds among the most prominent participants in the programme.

By February 1992, the Harvard funds had attracted about 400,000 investors. The Harvard name itself became an important part of the company's marketing; contemporary reporting described the label as a significant factor in attracting public interest, while Harvard University objected to the company's unauthorized use of its name.

The number of investors subsequently eventually grew to more than 800,000. Kožený's promised payout was initially honoured for many participants; Czech Radio reported that nearly 300,000 shareholders collected the advertised return in 1993.

In 1995, Kožený became a naturalised Irish citizen through Ireland's then passports-for-investment scheme, after investing £1 million in the Irish software company Irish Medical Systems.

In 1996, the Harvard funds were transformed into holding companies and subsequently merged with Sklo Union Teplice to form Harvardský průmyslový holding (HPH). In June that year, the share portfolios of the six Harvard funds and Sklo Union were transferred to Daventree, a company established in Cyprus by Kožený and the Stratton investment group of American businessman Michael Dingman. In exchange, the Harvard companies received a 50-percent stake in Daventree, while Stratton held the other half.

In August 1997, HPH shareholders voted to place the company into liquidation. The company's assets were later sold to Kožený's Harvard Capital Management Worldwide. Contemporary reporting valued the assets at about CZK 19.9 billion on the company's books, while the purchase price was approximately CZK 10.6 billion.

== Czech criminal proceedings ==
Kožený and his former associate Boris Vostrý were prosecuted in the Czech Republic over the transfer of assets from the Harvard companies. Both were tried in absentia. In July 2010, the Municipal Court in Prague found them guilty of fraud and sentenced each to ten years in prison.

In October 2012, the High Court in Prague upheld Kožený's ten-year sentence while reducing Vostrý's sentence to nine years. The judgment was final. A New York appellate court later recorded that the Czech judgment ordered Kožený to pay Harvardský průmyslový holding about CZK 8.29 billion in compensation for its losses.

Kožený and Vostrý subsequently appealed to the Supreme Court of the Czech Republic, which rejected their appeals in March 2014 as manifestly unfounded. Harvardský průmyslový holding later sought to enforce the Czech compensation award against Kožený's assets in the US, but a New York appellate court ruled that the award could be recognized and enforced in the country. Kožený later unsuccessfully sought to have the case dismissed, and the enforcement proceedings were still continuing in 2024.

== Azerbaijan investments and U.S. proceedings ==
In the late 1990s, Kožený became involved in Azerbaijan's privatization programme, acquiring large numbers of privatization vouchers through companies including the Minaret Group and Oily Rock Group. Beginning in 1997, he attracted several major American investors to a consortium that sought to acquire a stake in the state oil company SOCAR if it was privatized. Investors ultimately committed more than $450 million to the venture.

Disputes subsequently arose between Kožený and his investors. Companies associated with Omega Advisors and AIG alleged that Kožený had misrepresented the prices at which privatization vouchers and options were being acquired and had diverted part of their investment. In 2003, the Manhattan District Attorney indicted Kožený on charges relating to an alleged $182 million fraud against investors in the Azerbaijan venture.

In a separate federal case, United States prosecutors indicted Kožený, Frederic Bourke and investment manager David Pinkerton in 2005 over an alleged scheme to bribe Azerbaijani officials in connection with the proposed privatization of SOCAR. The indictment included charges under the Foreign Corrupt Practices Act, as well as money-laundering and related offences.

=== Extradition proceedings in the Bahamas ===
Kožený was arrested in Nassau on 5 October 2005 following the U.S. charges and was remanded in custody. The United States formally requested his extradition the following month so that he could stand trial in New York.

In 2007, the Supreme Court of the Bahamas granted his application for habeas corpus and set aside the committal order, ruling that the remaining charges did not constitute extradition offences under Bahamian law. The United States appealed, but the Court of Appeal of the Bahamas dismissed the appeal in January 2010, and Kožený was unconditionally discharged.

The U.S. government sought a further appeal to the Judicial Committee of the Privy Council. In March 2012, the Privy Council held that it had no jurisdiction to hear an appeal against Kožený's discharge in the proceedings, leaving the Bahamian court decision in place.

In 2023, Czech reporting described him as continuing to live there while his ten-year Czech prison sentence remained unserved. In 2024, he is still wanted by Czech and U.S. authorities.

== See also ==
- List of fugitives from justice who disappeared
