= Voucher privatization =

Method of privatization to sell state-owned enterprises

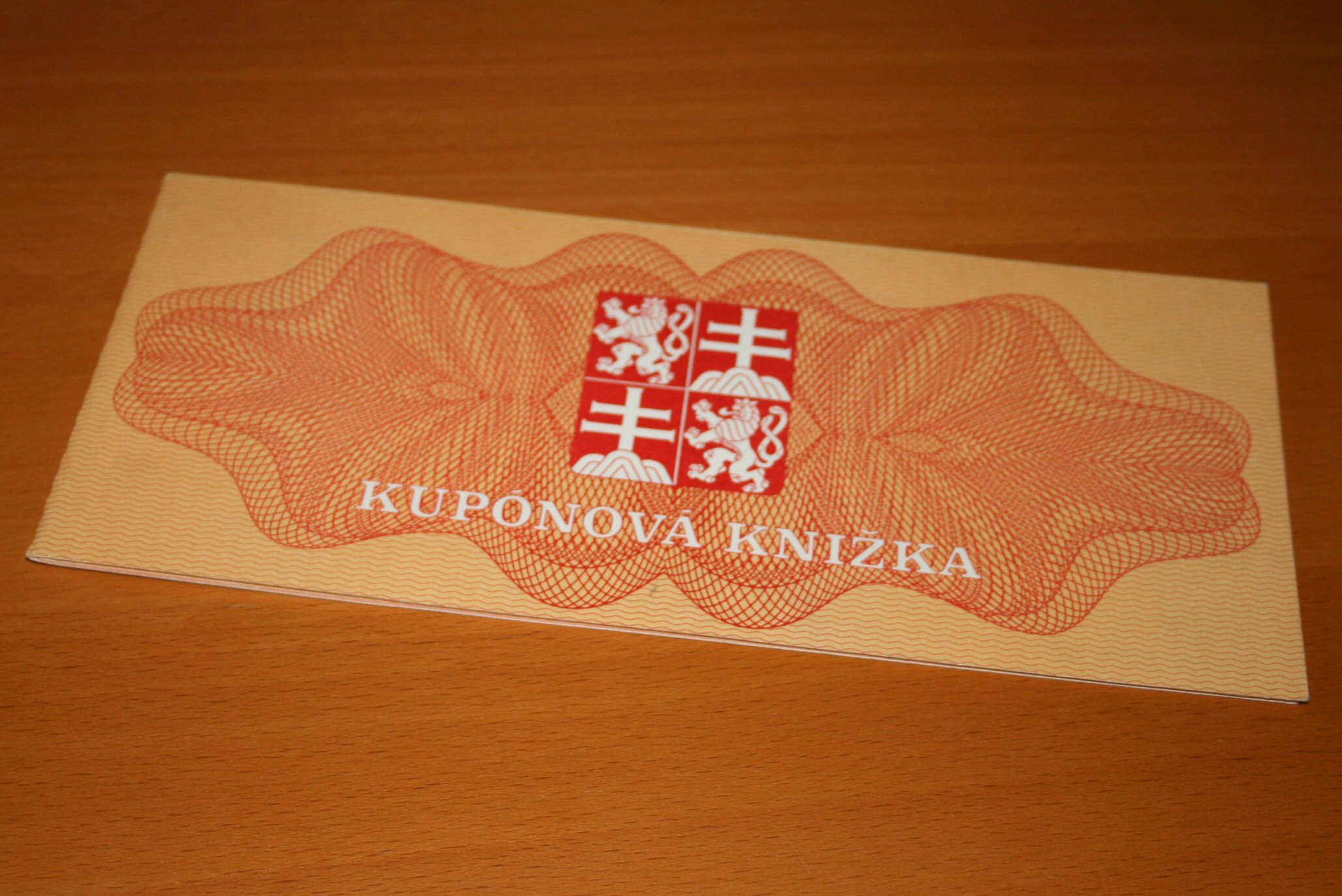
Privatization voucher used in Czechoslovakia

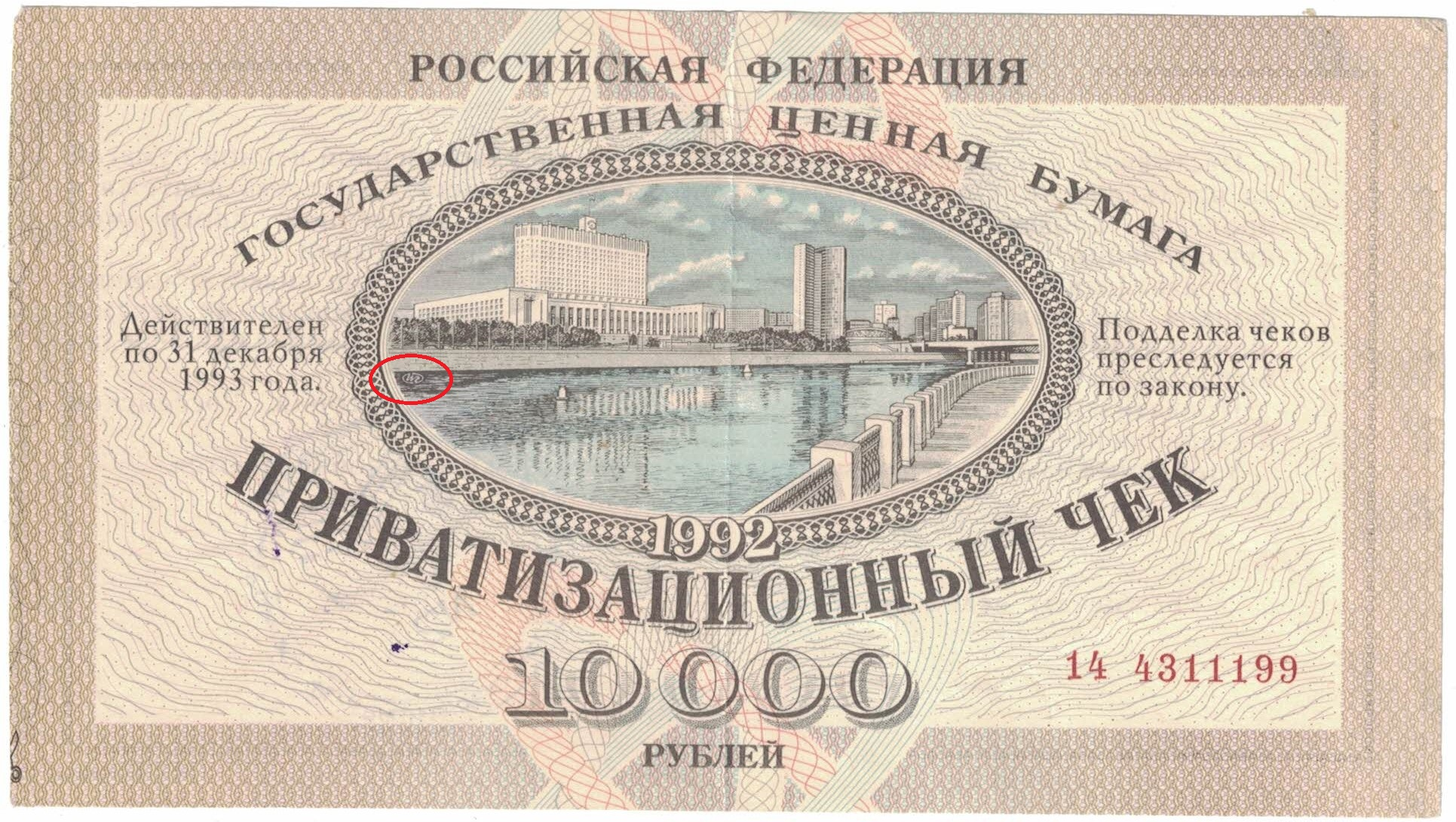
Russian 'privatization check (voucher)', 1992

Voucher privatization (Czech: Kupónová privatizace, Russian: Ваучерная приватизация, romanized: Vauchernaya privatizatsiya) is a privatization method where citizens are given or can inexpensively buy a book of vouchers that represent potential shares in any state-owned company. Voucher privatization has mainly been used in the early to mid-1990s in the transition economies of Central and Eastern Europe, including Bulgaria, Slovenia, Czechoslovakia, Hungary, Estonia, Latvia and Lithuania.

== See also ==
- History of post-Soviet Russia
- Viktor Kožený
- Privatization in Russia
