= Senate district 63 – Přerov =

Electoral district in the Czech Republic

63 – Přerov
- inline Senate district of the Czech Republic

- The Přerov district on a map
- Senator: Jakub Navařík; ODS
- Region: Olomouc; Moravian-Silesian
- District: Přerov; Nový Jičín
- Last election: 2026
- Next election: 2032

Senate district 63 – Přerov is an electoral district of the Senate of the Czech Republic, consisting of parts of Přerov and Nový Jičín districts. Since 2026, Jakub Navařík has been Senator for the district, representing ODS.

== Senators ==
| Year | Senator | Party |
|---|---|---|
| 1996 | Jitka Seitlová | ODA |
| 2002 | Jitka Seitlová | NEZ |
| 2007 | Jiří Lajtoch | ČSSD |
| 2008 | Jiří Lajtoch | ČSSD |
| 2014 | Jitka Seitlová | SZ |
| 2020 | Jitka Seitlová | KDU-ČSL |
| 2026 | Jakub Navařík | ODS |

== Election results ==
=== 1996 ===
1996 Czech Senate election in Přerov
| Candidate | Party | 1st round | | 2nd round | |
| Candidate | Party | Votes | % | Votes | % |
|---|---|---|---|---|---|
| Jitka Seitlová | ODA | 8 111 | 26.27 | 17 937 | 72.91 |
| Stanislav Žalud | ODS | 7 950 | 25.74 | 6 666 | 27.09 |
| Bronislav Bagar | ČSSD | 7 631 | 24.72 | — | — |
| Hynek Mizera | KSČM | 4 964 | 16.08 | — | — |
| Michal Chromec | MDS | 1 719 | 5.57 | — | — |
| Emanuel Sazima | ČSNS | 505 | 1.64 | — | — |

=== 2002 ===
2002 Czech Senate election in Přerov
| Candidate | Party | 1st round | | 2nd round | |
| Candidate | Party | Votes | % | Votes | % |
|---|---|---|---|---|---|
| Jitka Seitlová | NEZ | 10 536 | 44.28 | 23 812 | 72.65 |
| Josef Nekl | KSČM | 4 126 | 17.34 | 8 961 | 27.34 |
| Otakar Šiška | KDU-ČSL | 3 660 | 15.38 | — | — |
| Jindřich Valouch | ČSSD | 2 768 | 11.63 | — | — |
| František Kopečný | ODS | 2 636 | 11.08 | — | — |
| Václav Vápeník | DL | 64 | 0.26 | — | — |

=== 2007 ===
2007 Czech Senate by-election in Přerov
| Candidate | Party | 1st round | | 2nd round | |
| Candidate | Party | Votes | % | Votes | % |
|---|---|---|---|---|---|
| Jiří Lajtoch | ČSSD | 3 946 | 20.91 | 5 552 | 53.23 |
| Josef Nekl | KSČM | 3 822 | 20.25 | 4 877 | 46.76 |
| Jiří Bakalík | KDU-ČSL | 2 814 | 14.91 | — | — |
| Elena Grambličková | ODS | 2 809 | 14.88 | — | — |
| Vladimír Juračka | SOS | 2 714 | 14.38 | — | — |
| Jiří Klein | NEZ | 1 381 | 7.31 | — | — |
| Monika Holečková | SZR | 1 012 | 5.36 | — | — |
| Jaroslav Suchánek | SNK ED | 373 | 1.97 | — | — |

=== 2008 ===
2008 Czech Senate election in Přerov
| Candidate | Party | 1st round | | 2nd round | |
| Candidate | Party | Votes | % | Votes | % |
|---|---|---|---|---|---|
| Jiří Lajtoch | ČSSD | 11 811 | 32.56 | 18 030 | 61.06 |
| Eduard Sohlich | ODS | 7 406 | 20.42 | 11 497 | |
| Josef Nekl | KSČM | 6 365 | 17.55 | — | — |
| Vladimír Hučín | KAN | 3 753 | 10.34 | — | — |
| Jiří Bakalík | KDU-ČSL | 3 630 | 10.00 | — | — |
| Vlasta Jančářová | Independent | 2 278 | 6.28 | — | — |
| Roman Haken | SZ | 1 021 | 2.81 | — | — |

=== 2014 ===
2014 Czech Senate election in Přerov
| Candidate | Party | 1st round | | 2nd round | |
| Candidate | Party | Votes | % | Votes | % |
|---|---|---|---|---|---|
| Jitka Seitlová | SZ, KDU-ČSL | 15 329 | 39.95 | 9 523 | 54.26 |
| Antonín Prachař | ANO 2011 | 11 576 | 30.17 | 8 027 | 45.73 |
| Michal Chromec | ČSSD | 4 951 | 12.90 | — | — |
| Miroslav Raindl | KSČM | 4 937 | 12.86 | — | — |
| Dušan Hluzín | TOP 09, STAN | 1 574 | 4.10 | — | — |

=== 2020 ===
2020 Czech Senate election in Přerov
| Candidate | Party | 1st round | | 2nd round | |
| Candidate | Party | Votes | % | Votes | % |
|---|---|---|---|---|---|
| Jitka Seitlová | KDU-ČSL | 9 566 | 26.81 | 10 859 | 55.90 |
| Petr Vrána | ANO 2011 | 7 371 | 20.65 | 8 566 | 44.09 |
| Tomáš Kocourek | ODS | 4 549 | 12.75 | — | — |
| Pavel Ondrůj | Pirates | 3 143 | 8.80 | — | — |
| Dan Chromec | SPD | 2 762 | 7.74 | — | — |
| Antonín Prachař | Independent | 2 533 | 7.09 | — | — |
| Jiří Kudláček | Tricolour, ODA | 2 058 | 5.76 | — | — |
| Miroslav Raindl | KSČM | 1 847 | 5.17 | — | — |
| Jiří Lajtoch | ČSSD | 1 145 | 3.20 | — | — |
| Jiří Kubala | NEZ | 636 | 1.78 | — | — |
| Jaroslav Pollák | NáS | 68 | 0.19 | — | — |

=== 2026 ===
2026 Czech Senate election in Přerov
| Candidate | Party | 1st round | | 2nd round | |
| Candidate | Party | Votes | % | Votes | % |
|---|---|---|---|---|---|
| Jakub Navařík | ODS, KDU-ČSL, TOP 09, STAN | 15 561 | 38,54 | 13 451 | 56,91 |
| Petr Vrána | ANO 2011 | 15 192 | 37,62 | 10 181 | 43,08 |
| Marek Obrtel | ČSNS | 6 073 | 15,04 | — | — |
| Dan Chromec | SPD | 3 548 | 8,78 | — | — |
