= Václav Láska (politician) =

Czech politician (born 1974)

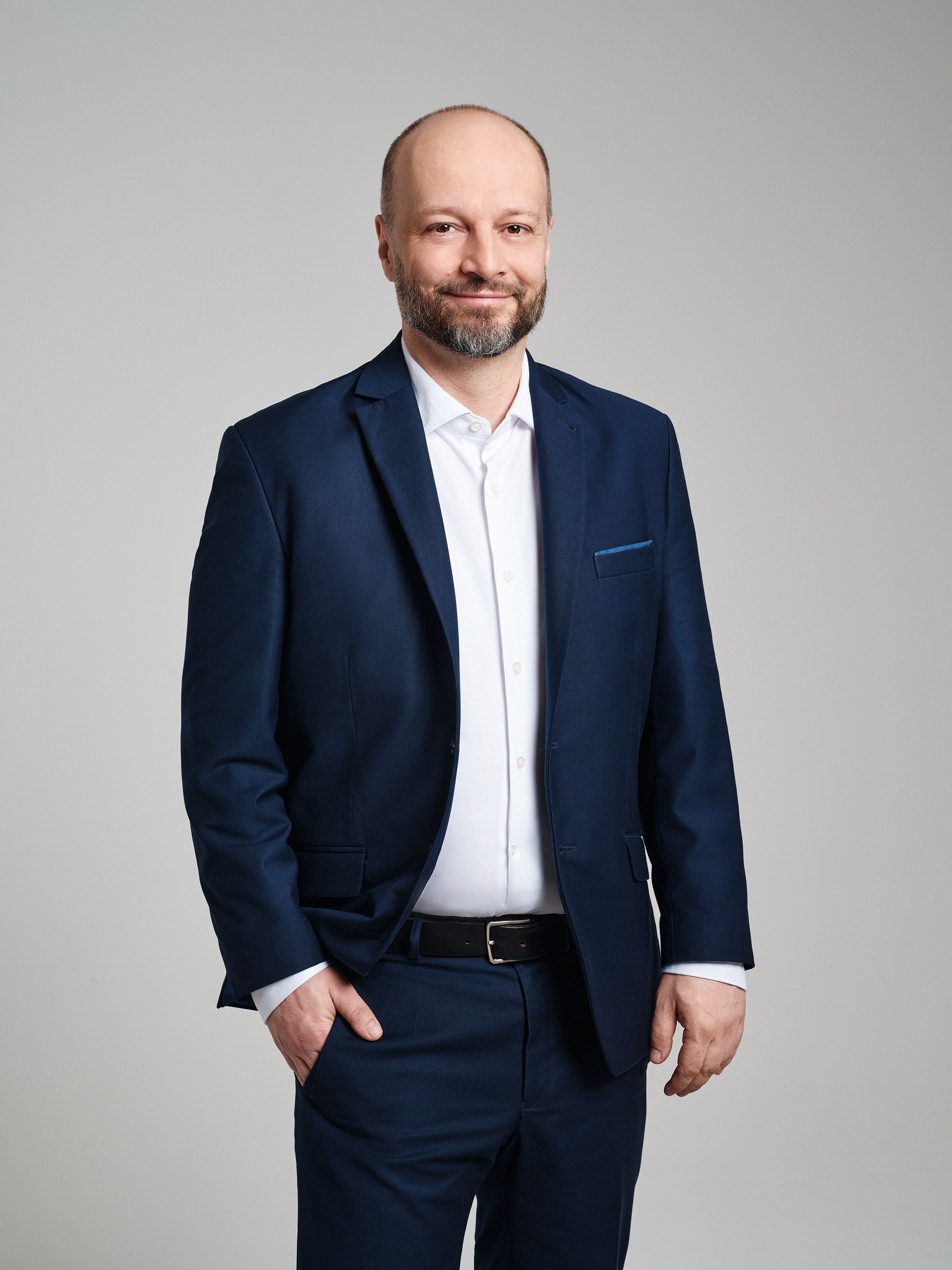
- Láska in 2026

Senator from Prague 5
- Incumbent
- Assumed office 18 October 2014
- Preceded by: Miroslav Škaloud

Leader of the Senator 21
- Incumbent
- Assumed office 24 April 2018
- Preceded by: Position established

Personal details
- Born: 4 August 1974 (age 52) Rakovník, Czechoslovakia
- Party: Green Party (2014–2017); Senator 21 (2017–present)
- Education: University of West Bohemia; University of Hradec Králové

Václav Láska (born 4 August 1974) is a Czech politician and head of the Senator 21 party, which he founded in 2017. He was elected to the Czech Senate during the 2020 election. Láska ran as independent with the support of Czech Pirate Party. Besides his political career he is a barrister, former police investigator and chairman of the board of Transparency International.

== Biography ==
Láska was born on 4 August 1974 in Rakovník. He worked in the ranks of the Police of the Czech Republic from the age of 18. He started as a rank-and-file police officer in the district department, later worked as an assistant investigator and then an investigator at the Regional Investigation Office, specializing in economic crime. In 1999, he joined the Office of Financial Crime and State Protection (ÚFKOS), where he led investigations related to IPB and the Harvard funds.

After the demise of ÚFKOS in 2003, he left the ranks of the police, briefly worked in the field of economic consulting, and in 2007 he also worked for a few months at the ABL security agency. While employed, he studied social pathology at the University of Pedagogy in Hradec Králové in 1996–1999, and law at the Law Faculty of the University of West Bohemia in Plzeň in 1999–2004.

From 2002 he worked at Transparency International, until 2011 he was the chairman of the board of directors. He has been practicing law since 2004. In July 2007, Minister of the Interior Ivan Langer rejected Láska's request for a waiver of confidentiality, the approval of which would have allowed him to testify in the USA in the case of Viktor Kožený. According to spokeswoman Alena Vokráčková, the reason was "the difference in the legal systems of both countries". He has been running his own law firm since 2010. He lectures on legal and security issues for private companies and teaches at the Czech Technical University in Prague CTU. In 2011, he analyzed the Promopro case, filed a criminal complaint in the case, which led to the initiation of criminal prosecution of high-ranking state officials.
