= Karel Řehka =

Czech general and politician

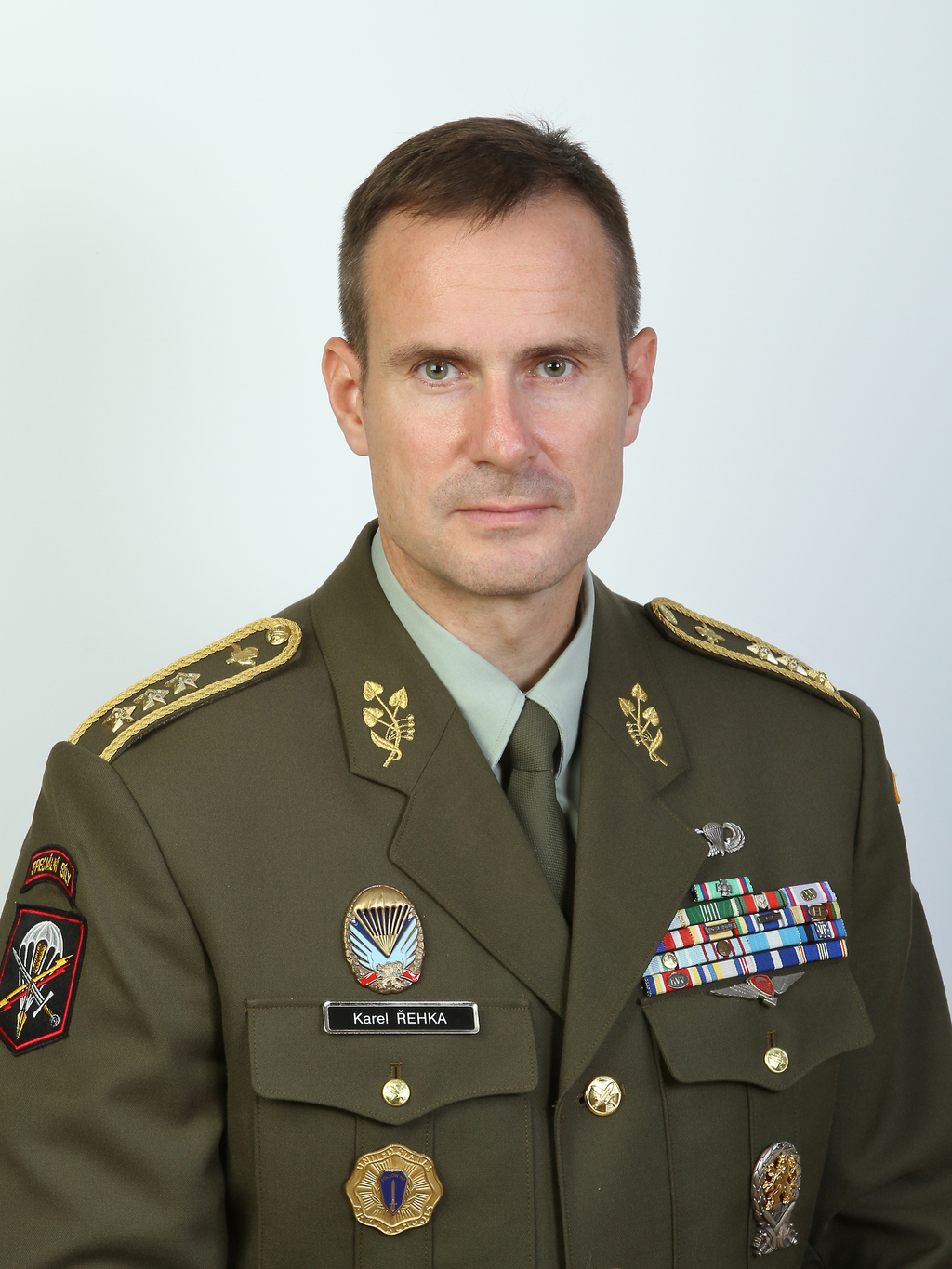

Senator from Plzeň-City
- Incumbent
- Assumed office 17 October 2026
- Preceded by: Lumír Aschenbrenner

29th Chief of the General Staff
- In office 1 July 2022 – 30 June 2026
- President: Miloš Zeman; Petr Pavel
- Preceded by: Aleš Opata
- Succeeded by: Miroslav Hlaváč

Director of the National Cyber and Information Security Agency
- In office 20 March 2020 – 20 June 2022
- Prime Minister: Andrej Babiš; Petr Fiala
- Preceded by: Dušan Navrátil
- Succeeded by: Lukáš Kintr

Personal details
- Born: 1 February 1975 (age 51) Brno, Czechoslovakia (Note: The 601st Special Forces Group's biography of Řehka gives his birthplace as Tišnov.)
- Party: Independent

Military service
- Allegiance: Czech Republic
- Branch/service: Czech Special Forces
- Years of service: 1996–2026
- Rank: Army general
- Commands: Chief of the General Staff; 601st Special Forces Group

Karel Řehka (born 1 February 1975) is a Czech politician and retired army general who has served as the Senator from Plzeň-City since October 2026. He served as the Chief of the General Staff of the Czech Armed Forces from 2022 to 2026. Before that, he was director of the National Cyber and Information Security Agency (NÚKIB) from 2020 to 2022.

A special forces officer for most of his career, Řehka served in Kosovo and Afghanistan, commanded the 601st Special Forces Group from 2010 to 2014, and was deputy commander of NATO's Multinational Division North East in Poland. As Chief of the General Staff, he spoke publicly about defense spending and alliance commitments, which brought him into repeated conflict with politicians. After stepping down as chief in 2026, he joined the board of directors of the University of West Bohemia. Later that year, he was elected to the Senate as an independent candidate.

== Education ==
Between 1989 and 1993, he studied at the Military Gymnasium in Opava, and from 1993 to 1997 he studied reconnaissance at the Ground Forces College in Vyškov. Before graduating, he completed a one-year officer course at the Royal Military Academy Sandhurst in the United Kingdom in 1996 as a foreign cadet.

== Military career ==
After completing his studies in Vyškov, he was assigned to the 6th Special Brigade in Prostějov as a group commander. In 1998, he was sent to the US Army's Ranger School, which he completed in March 1999. In June 1999, he was deployed to Kosovo in Operation Joint Guardian as a detachment commander in the 6th KFOR reconnaissance company.

After returning home in the summer of 2000, he was posted to the Ground Forces College in Vyškov as a senior officer in the department of foreign relations. He completed his master's degree by distance learning during the same period.

In 2001, he helped establish a group of joint terminal attack controllers at the 32nd Tactical Air Force Base in Náměšť nad Oslavou, and commanded it until 2002. (Note: The official army CV gives his command of the group as 2001–2003, and his move to the 601st Special Forces Group as 2003.) In 2002, he completed a forward air controllers' course in the United Kingdom. Subsequently, he returned to Prostějov, where he served as a company commander and later as a center commander of the 601st Special Forces Group from October 2002 to July 2006. During this period, he completed a course in crisis management of state defense at the Military Academy in Brno in 2003. In 2004, he served as deputy commander of a special forces contingent in Operation Enduring Freedom in Afghanistan.

From August 2006 to July 2009, he served as a Senior Officer – Specialist of the Special Forces Department at the headquarters of the Allied Rapid Reaction Corps in Rheindahlen, Germany, returning to Afghanistan twice in 2006–2007 and 2007–2008. After returning to the Czech Republic, he worked at the Directorate of Special Forces Management of the Ministry of Defense and served as the military assistant to the Minister of Defense.

From May 2010 to October 2014, he was the commander of the 601st Special Forces Group. In 2011, he commanded the Special Forces Task Force in the ISAF mission in Afghanistan. From November 2014 until 2017, he held the post of director at the newly established Directorate of Special Forces of the Ministry of Defense. From 2015 to 2016, he completed the General Staff course at the University of Defence in Brno. On 28 October 2016, the President of the Czech Republic, Miloš Zeman, promoted him to brigadier general. From 2017 to 2020, he was deputy commander of the Multinational Division North East in Elbląg, Poland, which includes NATO's rapid-reaction units deployed forward in Poland and the Baltic states. In 2017, his book Informační válka (Information Warfare) was published by Academia.

== National Cyber and Information Security Agency ==
On 20 March 2020, the Babiš government appointed Řehka, then the deputy commander of Multinational Division North East, as the director of the National Cyber and Information Security Agency (NÚKIB), replacing Dušan Navrátil, whom it had dismissed in December 2019. He left active military service to take up the post. Under his leadership, the agency repeatedly dealt with cyberattacks on Czech institutions and companies, many of them attributed to Russia. He resigned with effect from 20 June 2022 on his appointment as the Chief of the General Staff, and was succeeded by his deputy, Lukáš Kintr.

== Chief of the General Staff ==
In June 2022, the Fiala government approved the nomination of Řehka, then director of NÚKIB, as Chief of the General Staff, following a proposal by Defense Minister Jana Černochová. He became the first chief of the army to return to uniform from a civilian office and one of the youngest to hold the post. President Miloš Zeman appointed him to the post in June 2022 and promoted him to major general on 22 June 2022. He took office on 1 July 2022. President Petr Pavel promoted him to lieutenant general on 8 May 2023 and, on 8 May 2025, to Army general, the highest rank in the Czech army.

As chief, Řehka spoke out publicly against stagnating defense budgets and breaches of alliance commitments, which brought him into conflict with politicians. His remarks on preparing the army for a major war and on introducing a new form of military service drew controversy, and critics accused him of politicizing the army. During his tenure, he had repeated disputes with Defense Minister Jana Černochová. In spring 2023 he reportedly considered resigning over them, but was persuaded to stay by national security adviser Tomáš Pojar and Prime Minister Fiala. Later points of contention included his support for Skupina D, an association supplying drones to Ukraine, and his public criticism of how the Ministry of Defense operated.

The Babiš government chose his first deputy, Miroslav Hlaváč, as his successor. Pavel appointed Hlaváč on 30 June 2026, and on the same day, Řehka symbolically handed over the General Staff's battle flag at Vítkov. Hlaváč took office on 1 July 2026. His military service commitment ended on 31 August 2026.

== Later career ==
After leaving command, Řehka joined the board of directors of the University of West Bohemia in Plzeň in July 2026. He was nominated by the university and appointed to this honorary, unpaid post by Education Minister Robert Plaga.

=== 2026 Senate election ===
In July 2026, Řehka announced he was running in the 2026 Senate election for Senate district 9 – Plzeň-City as an independent candidate, nominated by the Mayors and Independents (STAN) party. His candidacy, announced while he was still a serving soldier, drew criticism from Defense Minister Jaromír Zůna and Zůna's predecessor, Jana Černochová. Zůna said that although the candidacy was lawful, it went against the spirit of the law. Černochová said a Chief of the General Staff should remain apolitical until his last day of service. A spokesperson for the General Staff explained that serving soldiers were not prohibited from standing for election with a party's support. In the first round, held on 9–10 October, Řehka led with 32.9% of the vote (12,611 votes), ahead of the ANO 2011 candidate Lucie Kantorová with 27.3%. He won in a run-off against Kantorová on 16–17 October, taking 59.4% of the vote, and was elected to the Senate on 17 October 2026.

== Personal life ==
Řehka has two daughters with his first wife, Irena. In May 2024, he announced that they had separated. The following day, it emerged that he was in a relationship with Michaela Opltová, a Mayors and Independents member of the Chamber of Deputies who sat on its defense committee. She later moved to the security committee to avoid a possible conflict of interest. They married on 27 June 2026 at Křimice, near Plzeň, and she took the surname Řehková. The couple live near Plzeň.

== Awards and recognition ==
- Arnošt Lustig Award (2019)
- Knight's Cross of the Order of Merit of the Republic of Poland (2023)
- Order of Merit, 2nd class (Ukraine, 2023)
- Medal of Merit for services to the state in the field of defense (2025)
- Ordre national du Mérite, Commander (2026)

== Works ==
- Řehka, Karel (2017). Informační válka [Information Warfare] (in Czech). Prague: Academia. ISBN 978-80-200-2770-2.
- Řehka, Karel; Hamšík, Ivan (2026). Řehka: Když není kam uhnout [Řehka: When There Is Nowhere to Turn Aside] (in Czech). Prague: Mladá fronta. ISBN 978-80-204-6730-0.
