= Jitka Seitlová =

Czech politician, geologist (born 1954)

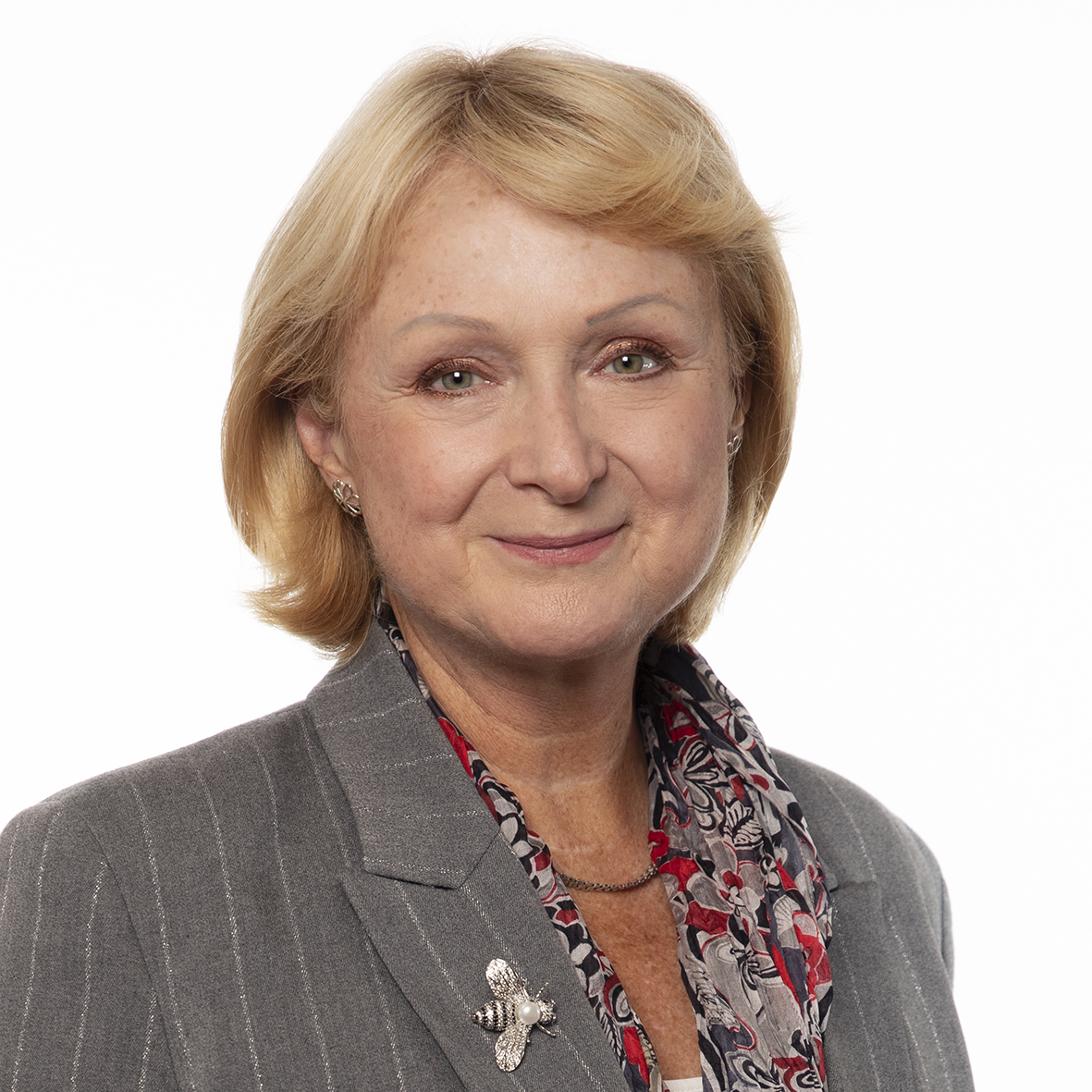
- Seitlová in 2020

Senator from Přerov
- In office 18 October 2014 – 10 October 2026
- Preceded by: Jiří Lajtoch
- Succeeded by: Jakub Navařík
- In office 23 November 1996 – 14 February 2007
- Succeeded by: Jiří Lajtoch

Personal details
- Born: 17 April 1954 (age 72) Přerov, Czechoslovakia
- Party: ODA (1995–2002); KDU-ČSL (2017–)
- Profession: Politician

Jitka Seitlová (born 17 April 1954) is a Czech politician and former senator for Přerov District, a position which she held from 2014 to 2026. She also served for the same district between 1996 and 2007. She won in the 1996 Czech Senate election, ahead of ODS candidate Stanislav Žalud. In November 2020, she was elected as deputy speaker (Vice-President) of the Senate.
