= Josef Řihák =

Czech politician

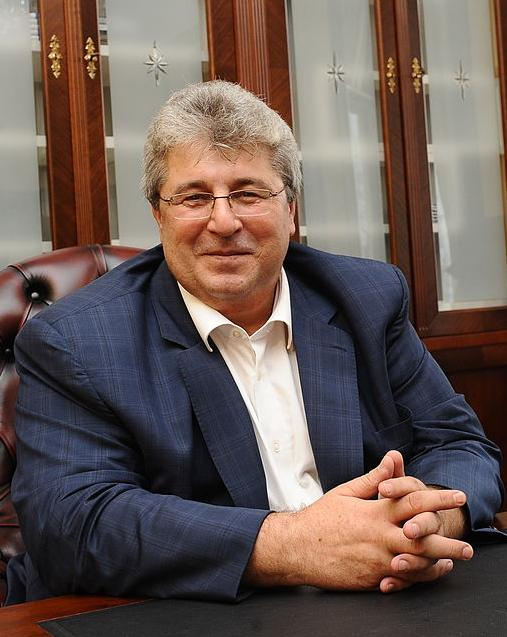

4th Governor of the Central Bohemian Region
- Incumbent
- Assumed office 20 November 2012
- Preceded by: Zuzana Moravčíková

Senator from Příbram
- Incumbent
- Assumed office 25 October 2008
- Preceded by: Jaromír Volný

Mayor of Příbram
- In office 2006–2012
- Preceded by: Ivan Fuksa
- Succeeded by: Pavel Pikrt

Personal details
- Born: 25 April 1959 (age 67) Karlovy Vary, Czechoslovakia
- Party: ČSSD
- Spouse: Hana Řiháková
- Education: University of Veterinary and Pharmaceutical Sciences Brno

Josef Řihák (born 25 April 1959 in Karlovy Vary) is a former Czech politician who was a member of the Czech Social Democratic Party (ČSSD) from 1998 to 2023. He served as a senator for District No. 18—Příbram from 2008 to 2014, mayor of Příbram from 2006 to 2012, and a member of the Chamber of Deputies of the Parliament of the Czech Republic from 2002 to 2008. He was also a representative of the Central Bohemian Region from 2000 to 2007 and again from 2012 to 2020, serving as governor of the region from November 2012 until his resignation in June 2014 and as a regional councillor for investments and public procurement from 2017 to 2020. He has been a member of the Příbram City Council since 2002.

== Biography ==
He graduated from the Secondary Agricultural Technical School in Březnice and, after completing his basic military service, began working at the District Veterinary Administration in Příbram. He earned a degree through distance learning from the University of Veterinary Sciences in Brno (majoring in food hygiene and agricultural ecology) and holds the title of MVDr. From 1995 to 1998 he worked as a district veterinary inspector and later as head of the Veterinary and Hygiene Station in Příbram.

== Political career ==
From 1998 to 2023 he was a member of the Czech Social Democratic Party (ČSSD).

He was elected to the Regional Council of the Central Bohemian Region in 2000 as a ČSSD candidate. In the 2002 elections he was elected to the Chamber of Deputies for the Central Bohemian Region constituency. He served on the Chamber’s Agriculture Committee and retained his seat in the 2006 elections. From 2006 to 2007 he was vice-chairman of the committee. He remained in the Chamber until October 2008, when he resigned his seat. In the Chamber he co-sponsored five bills, two of which were passed (including the Act on Public Non-Profit Institutional Healthcare Facilities).

He has long been active in local politics. In the 2002, 2006 and 2010 municipal elections he was elected to the Příbram City Council for the ČSSD. In 2002 he also joined the city council under Mayor Ivan Fuksa (ODS). In the autumn of 2006 he headed the Social Democrats’ candidate list in Příbram; the party gained two additional seats. After two weeks of negotiations Řihák was elected mayor as the representative of a minority coalition of the ČSSD and the SNK European Democrats, supported by Communist Party of Bohemia and Moravia councillors. He then resigned from the Central Bohemian Regional Council.

From 2007 he represented mayors in opposition to the planned deployment of a U.S. radar system in the Czech Republic. After plans were announced to abolish the Brdy Military Training Area, he led initiatives to designate the area as a protected zone.

In 2008 the ČSSD–SNK coalition at Příbram City Hall collapsed and the ODS returned to the leadership of the city, though Řihák remained mayor. In 2010 the Social Democrats’ slate, led by him, won 31.87 percent of the vote and gained three additional seats (11 out of 25 in total). Shortly afterwards the ČSSD–ODS coalition was restored.

The ČSSD–ODS coalition was stable, though the opposition criticised efforts to privatise certain facilities. The sale of Polyclinic I met with the strongest opposition from the opposition, part of the public, and doctors who practised there; Řihák’s predecessor and ODS coalition partner Ivan Fuksa also disagreed with the circumstances. A petition against the sale was signed by thousands of residents and large public protests took place; the privatisation also led to an unsuccessful attempt to remove Řihák from office.

Under Řihák’s leadership the city, with the help of EU subsidies, renovated the bus station and the area around the cultural centre, began an extensive renovation of T. G. M. Square and its surroundings, and renovated the Březohorský housing estate including its central 17. listopadu Square.

In December 2011 an unknown perpetrator set fire to his family’s cottage; Řihák described the incident as an act of revenge linked to the Polyclinic controversy.

Following the David Rath corruption scandal, in 2012 he won the nomination as the Social Democrats’ lead candidate for the regional elections. Under his leadership the party won the election. Negotiations for a Social Democratic minority government failed, so the ČSSD reached a cooperation agreement with the Communist Party of Bohemia and Moravia (KSČM) that included the KSČM joining the regional council (the ČSSD maintained that this did not constitute a formal coalition). On 20 November 2012 Řihák was elected governor of the Central Bohemian Region; he intended to keep his Senate seat but announced his resignation as mayor. On 10 December 2012 he was succeeded as mayor of Příbram by Pavel Pikrt, who described him as the city’s best mayor since 1989.

On 20 June 2014 the Central Bohemian branch of the ČSSD called on him to resign as governor because he had lost their support. He did so three days later.

In the 2014 municipal elections he retained his seat on the Příbram City Council, having headed the local ČSSD ticket. The party suffered significant losses, losing seven seats and moving into opposition. The post-election period was also marked by a dispute with his successor as mayor, Pavel Pikrt, who left the ČSSD but retained his council seat. In the concurrent 2014 Senate elections he again ran for the ČSSD in District No. 18—Příbram, finishing third with 18.89% of the vote and failing to advance to the second round.

On 3 November 2014 the Central Bohemian Regional Council appointed him to head the Regional Property Commission. He was re-elected as a regional councillor in the 2016 elections. In October 2017 he was elected regional councillor for investments and public procurement. In the 2020 elections he ran for re-election as a regional councillor but was unsuccessful and left both the council and his councillor post.

== Personal life ==
Řihák is married and has a son and a daughter. He is a recipient of the PŘÍSTAV Award, presented to him in 2010 by the Czech Council for Children and Youth for his support of extracurricular work with children and youth.

Political offices
Preceded by Ivan Fuksa	Mayor of Příbram; 2006–2012	Succeeded by Pavel Pikrt

Political offices
Preceded by Ivan Fuksa	Mayor of Příbram; 2006-2012	Succeeded by Pavel Pikrt
