= Josef Vacek =

Czech weightlifter

Personal information
- Nationality: Czech
- Born: 18 July 1900

Sport
- Sport: Weightlifting

Josef Vacek (born 18 July 1900, date of death unknown) was a Czech weightlifter. He competed in the men's featherweight event at the 1928 Summer Olympics, where he placed joint 8th overall (along with Turkey's Cemal Erçman) in a field of 21 competitors.
