= Pavel Lebeda =

Czech politician (1940–2023)

Member of the Senate of the Czech Republic for Kolín
- In office 25 October 2008 – 25 October 2014
- Preceded by: Jan Rakušan
- Succeeded by: Emilie Třísková

Personal details
- Born: 30 June 1940 Zbraslav, Protectorate of Bohemia and Moravia
- Died: 6 June 2023 (aged 82)
- Party: ČSSD
- Education: Faculty of Medicine in Plzeň, Charles University
- Occupation: Surgeon

Pavel Lebeda (30 June 1940 – 6 June 2023) was a Czech politician. A member of the Czech Social Democratic Party, he served in the Senate from 2008 to 2014.

Lebeda died on 6 June 2023, at the age of 82.
