= 2018 Trutnov by-election =

2018 Czech senate by-election
| 5 and 6 January 2018 (first round); 12 and 13 January 2018 (second round) |
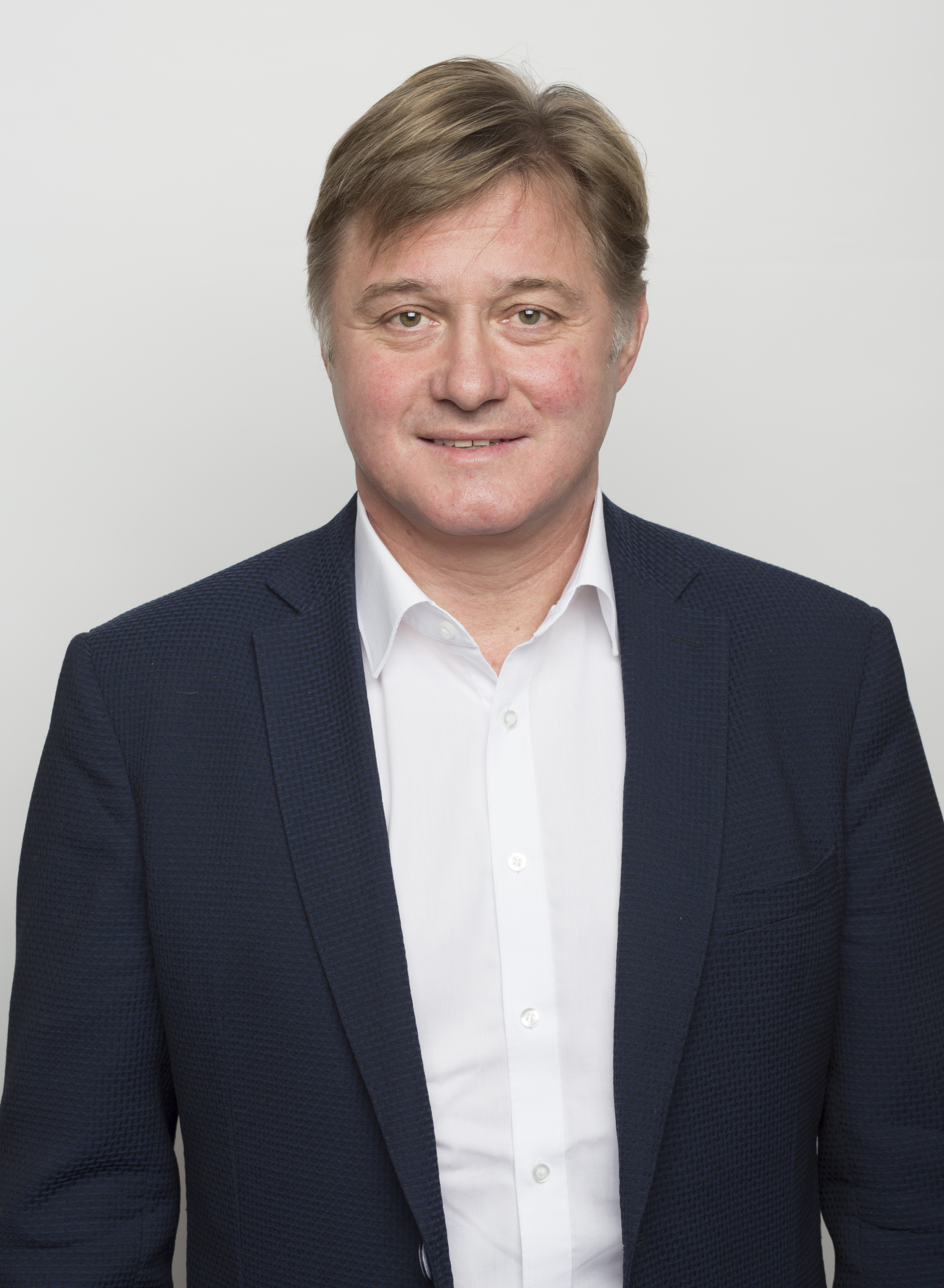

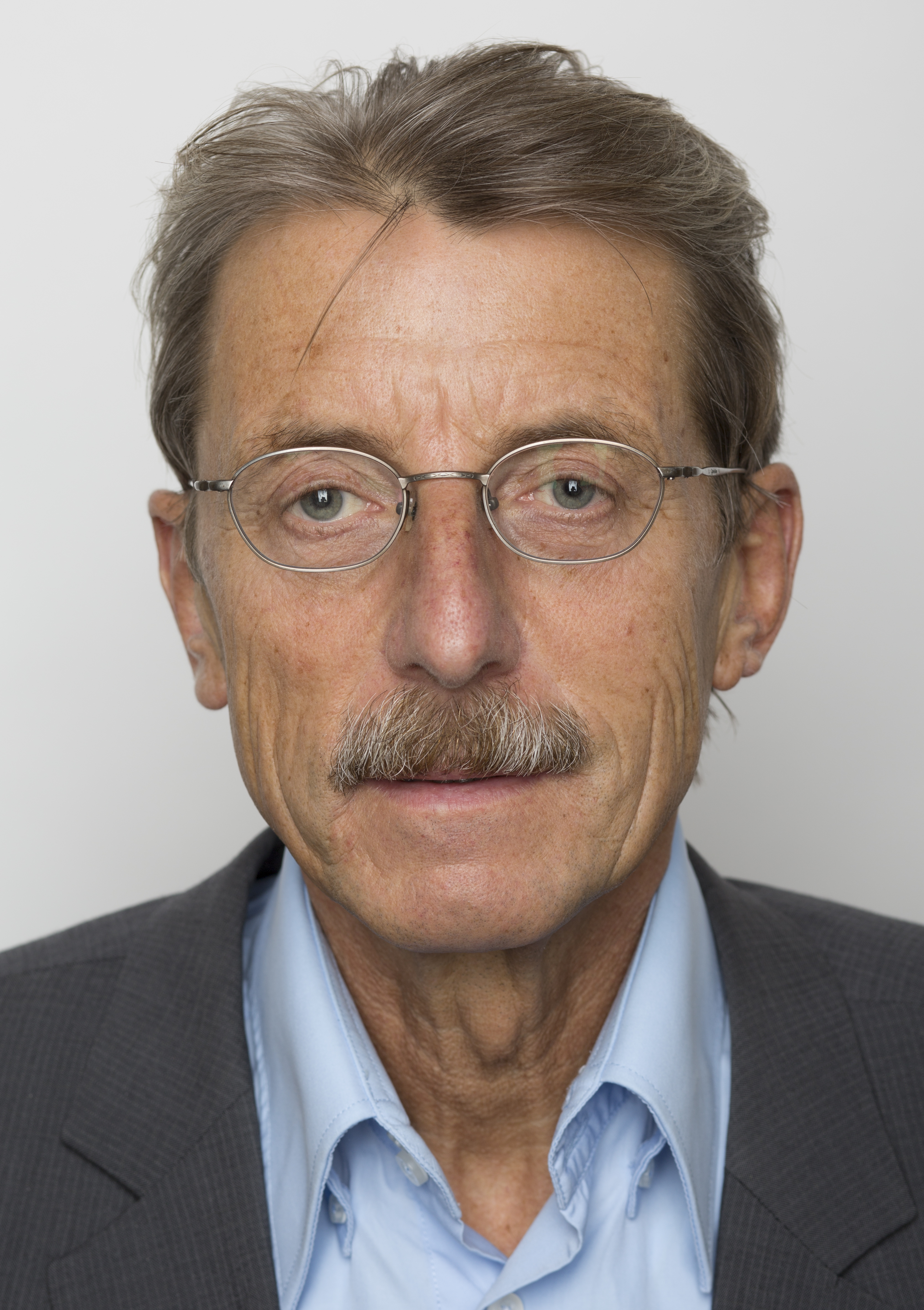
| | First party | Second party |
|---|---|---|
| Candidate | Jan Sobotka | Jiří Hlavatý |
| Party | STAN | ANO |
| Popular vote | 30,331 | 14,859 |
| Percentage | 67.1% | 32.9% |

A by-election for the Trutnov Senate seat in the Czech Republic was held over two rounds in January 2018. The first round was held on 5 and 6 January 2018, with the second round on 12 and 13 January. The front-runners in the election were Jan Sobotka, supported by right-wing parties, and Jiří Hlavatý, the candidate of ANO 2011. Both of these candidates qualified for the second round held on 12 and 13 January 2018, which was won by Sobotka with 67% of votes.

== Background ==
Incumbent Senator Jiří Hlavatý stood in the 2017 legislative election and was elected to the Chamber of Deputies. As a result, his mandate as a Senator ceased to exist. Hlavatý expressed his surprise, as he believed he would be able to choose which seat to take, and called the rule undemocratic and totalitarian.

On 25 October 2017, Czech president Miloš Zeman announced that the first round of the by-election would be held on 5 and 6 January 2018.

== Candidates ==
- Jaroslav Dvorský (Piráti), writer
- Terezie Holovská, businesswoman and lawyer
- Blanka Horáková (ODA), businesswoman
- Jiří Hlavatý (ANO 2011), MP and previous Senator. He stated on 31 October 2017 that he was considering running, and announced his candidacy on 2 November 2017.
- Iva Řezníčková (Communist Party of Bohemia and Moravia)
- Jan Sobotka (STAN, TOP 09, KDU–ČSL, ODS), Mayor of Vrchlabí. He was nominated by STAN. TOP 09 suggested it could support his candidacy.
- Klára Sovová (NEI), businesswoman. She announced her candidacy on 20 November 2017.
- Karel Šklíba (ČSSD), Deputy Mayor of Úpice.
- Luďka Tomešová (SPD), businesswoman

== Campaign ==
On 30 October 2017, Jan Sobotka announced his candidacy as the nominee of Mayors and Independents. He also received endorsements from TOP 09, the Christian and Democratic Union – Czechoslovak People's Party and the Civic Democratic Party. Hlavatý announced his candidacy on 2 November 2017. Jakub Dvorský announced his candidacy on 21 November 2017 as a candidate of the Czech Pirate Party.

Communist Party candidate Iva Řezníčková was accused of defamation on 22 November 2017. Hlavatý held a public discussion with voters on 1 December 2017.

Sobotka had four billboards put up within the district. He stated that his campaign would conclude with leaflets he would send to voters. Sobotka said that he wanted to maintain the status quo in the region.

Terezie Holovská was rejected as a candidate by the Municipal Bureau of Trutnov. She appealed the decision in Court. The Regional Court decided that the rejection of her candidacy was illegal, and her nomination was reinstated.

XTV held a debate between the candidates on 15 December 2017.

The campaign concluded on 4 January 2018. Sobotka announced that his campaign had cost 400,000 CZK. Hlavatý estimated that his campaign had cost 500,000 CZK, while Karel Šklíba estimated the cost of his campaign at 140,000 CZK. Political scientists predicted that the election would be won by Jiří Hlavatý or Jan Sobotka. Sobotka is popular in Vrchlabí and its surroundings while Hlavatý is popular in Dvůr Králové nad Labem and its surroundings.

The first round was held on 5 and 6 January 2018. Jan Sobotka received the highest number of votes, with Hlavatý second. Those two candidates faced each other in a run-off on 12 and 13 January. The turnout was very low. Sobotka said that he had expected the result. He said that he would hold meetings with voters and use social media for his campaign for the second round. Hlavatý's share of the vote fell 9% from the 2014 election, which he attributed to the media misquoting some things he had said. He stated that he would not campaign for the second round. Klára Sovová and Jaroslav Dvorský endorsed Jan Sobotka for the second round.

Evaluating the first round results, political scientist Jiří Štefek noted that Hlavatý's result in the first round was lower than expected, and stated that Hlavatý should work harder on his campaign before the second round if he wanted to win. Another disappointing result was that of the Social Democratic candidate Šklíba, who had been considered a strong candidate but received only 6%. Štefek also commented on the result of Terezie Holovská, who had been a high-profile candidate due to her problems registering. Štefek said that Holovská had never had a chance since the beginning of the election.

Sobotka was endorsed by four candidates prior to the second round: Klára Sovová, Jaroslav Dvorský, Karel Šklíba and Blanka Horáková. Hlavatý was endorse by Terezie Holovská. The second round will be held on 12 and 13 January 2018, alongside the first round of the presidential election. Sobotka defeated Hlavatý by a large margin in the second round held on 12 and 13 January 2018, receiving 67% of votes, with Hlavatý on 33% of votes.

== Betting odds ==
Betting shops considered Jiří Hlavatý the front runner. His betting odds were 1:1.8, while his main rival Sobotka had 1:2.5 odds. Klára Sovová was considered the third strongest candidate, with odds of 1:5.

== Results ==
| Candidate | Party | First round | | Second round | |
| Candidate | Party | Votes | % | Votes | % |
|---|---|---|---|---|---|
| Jan Sobotka | Mayors and Independents supported by ODS, TOP 09 and KDU–ČSL | 7,615 | 33.51% | 30,331 | 67.11% |
| Jiří Hlavatý | ANO 2011 | 5,728 | 25.21% | 14,859 | 32.88% |
| Klára Sovová | Independent Initiative | 2,700 | 11.88% | | |
| Jaroslav Dvorský | Czech Pirate Party | 2,406 | 10.59% | | |
| Iva Řezníčková | Communist Party of Bohemia and Moravia supported by SPO | 1,612 | 7.09% | | |
| Karel Šklíba | Czech Social Democratic Party | 1,294 | 5.69% | | |
| Luďka Tomešová | Freedom and Direct Democracy | 759 | 3.34% | | |
| Blanka Horáková | Civic Democratic Alliance | 455 | 2.00% | | |
| Terezie Holovská | Independent | 149 | 0.65 | | |
| Total valid votes | | 22,718 | 98.81 | 45,190 | 71.78% |
| Invalid votes | | 274 | 1.19 | 17,743 | 28.22% |
| Total | | 100,438 | 100 | 99,263 | 100 |
| Registered voters/turnout | | 22,992 | 22.90% | 62,956 | 59.43% |
Source:Czech Statistical Bureau

== Aftermath ==
Sobotka was elected as Senator, to serve the rest of Hlavatý's term. Sobotka stated that he plans to focus on regional development. Hlavatý said he had congratulated Sobotka, and suggested that people had most likely decided that businessmen don't belong in politics. Hlavatý decided to leave politics after his defeat.

Political scientist Jiří Štefek stated that Hlavatý's defeat was caused by disappointment with Andrej Babiš, and the other parties' support for Sobotka.
