= Ivan Fuksa =

Czech politician

Minister of Agriculture
- In office 13 July 2010 – 4 October 2011
- Prime Minister: Petr Nečas
- Preceded by: Jakub Šebesta
- Succeeded by: Petr Bendl

Member of the Chamber of Deputies
- In office 29 May 2010 – 7 November 2012

Mayor of Příbram
- In office 13 November 2002 – 7 November 2006
- Preceded by: Josef Vacek
- Succeeded by: Josef Řihák

Personal details
- Born: 15 July 1963 (age 63) Příbram, Czechoslovakia
- Party: ODS
- Education: University of Žilina

Ivan Fuksa (born 15 July 1963) is a Czech politician who served as Minister of Agriculture from 2010 to 2011 and member of the Chamber of Deputies from 2010 to 2012.

Fuksa graduated from the Transport and Communications University in Prague. He worked in the municipal transport company in Prague and after having returned to Příbram in 1988, he became teacher.

He was elected into Příbram city assembly in 1990 as the Civic Forum member. He co-founded Příbram's Civic Democratic Party (ODS), led it in the municipal elections and became Příbram's mayor in 2002. He replaced Josef Vacek in the seat.

In 2006, Fuksa's led ODS gained two more seats in the city assembly, but the party was not able to find a coalition partner and had to leave to opposition. Fuksa was replaced by new social-democratic mayor Josef Řihák, his former coalition partner.

On 29 January 2007 Minister of Finance Miroslav Kalousek named Fuksa his first deputy after the ODS nomination.

Fuksa is married again after divorcing once, has two children from his second marriage. He is an active athlete, he has participated in several sea-sailing competitions, climbed the top of Mont Blanc and finished several international marathons.

Political offices
Preceded by Josef Vacek	Mayor of Příbram; 2002–2006	Succeeded by Josef Řihák
