= Jiří Hlavatý =

Czech politician and businessman

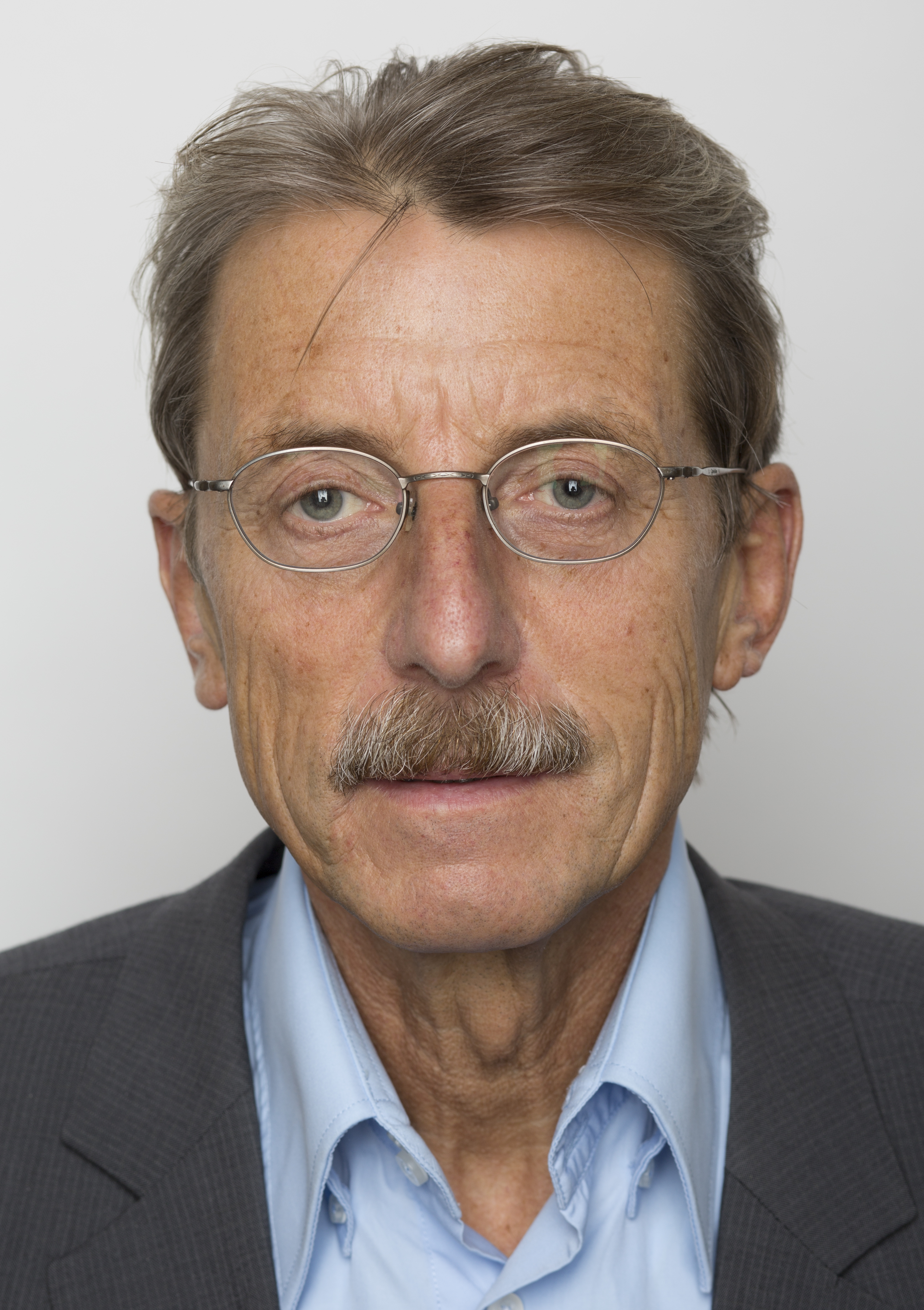

Senator from Trutnov
- In office 18 October 2014 – 21 October 2017
- Preceded by: Pavel Trpák
- Succeeded by: Jan Sobotka

Member of the Chamber of Deputies
- In office 21 October 2017 – 24 November 2017

Personal details
- Born: 29 July 1948 (age 78)
- Party: ANO 2011

Jiří Hlavatý (born 29 July 1948) is a Czech politician and businessman. He is a CEO and owner of JUTA company. He served as a Senator in 39 district - Trutnov until 2017 legislative election. He was elected a member of the Chamber of Deputies on 21 October 2017 and lost his Senate seat as a result. Hlavatý then gave up his seat in the Chamber of Deputies and announced his candidacy in by-election for his Senate seat.

== Biography ==
He studied Institute of Mechanical Engineering in Liberec.

He started to work at Juta state company after his studies. He eventually became the CEO of the company. Juta became a private company after the Velvet Revolution. Hlavatý owns Juta since 2007.

== Political career ==
Hlavatý entered politics in 2014 when he ran in Senate election for Trutnov seat. He was nominated by ANO 2011. Hlavatý received 26% in the first round and 60% in run-off and defeated TOP 09 nominee Adolf Klepš.

Hlavatý participated in 2017 legislative election. He was placed last on ANO 2011 list for Hradec Králové region. He was elected due to preferential votes. Hlavatý lost his Senate seat as a result. By-election i Trutnov district was called for 5 and 6 January 2018.

Hlavatý stated that he didn't know he will lose his Senate seat and expected that he will be allowed to choose if he wants to be a Senato or Deputy. He stated that he didn't want to be a Deputy and wanted to choose his Senate seat. He stated that he considers the fact that he lost his senate seat a return to Totality. Hlavatý decided to run in by-election to get his Senate seat back. When he was asked if he plans to pay for public costs of the election he stated that the by-election s caused by voters who elected him a Deputy and they should be asked if they pay for the costs. He gave up his seat in the Chamber of Deputies on 24 November 2017 and was replaced by Eva Matyášová.

Hlavatý received 25% in the first round of Trutnov by-election and advanced to run-off against Jan Sobotka who received 33.5%. Hlavatý lost the second round on 12 and 13 January 2018.
