= Jiří Bis =

Czech politician (1941–2018)

Jiří Bis (26 April 1941 in Ivančice – 3 October 2018) was a Czech politician who served as a Senator from 2008 to 2014.
