= Jan Sobotka =

Czech politician

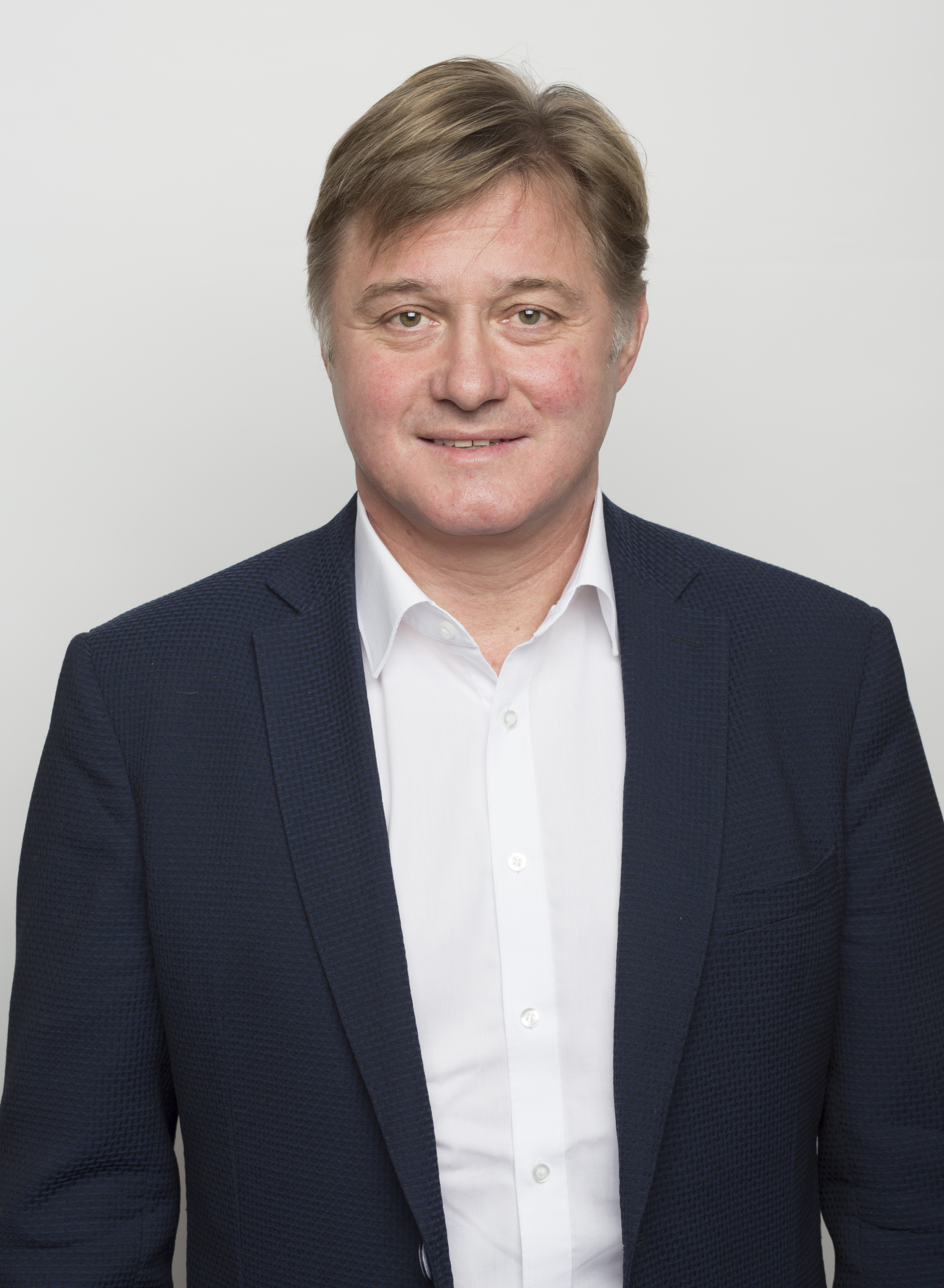

Senator from Trutnov
- Incumbent
- Assumed office 13 January 2018
- Preceded by: Jiří Hlavatý

Mayor of Vrchlabí
- Incumbent
- Assumed office 1998
- Preceded by: Josef Krejčí

Personal details
- Born: 25 July 1961 (age 65) Vrchlabí, Czechoslovakia
- Party: Independent (since 1998); Civic Democratic Party (1994–1998)
- Website: www.jansobotka.cz

Jan Sobotka (born 25 July 1961) is a Czech politician. He has served as mayor of Vrchlabí since 1998 and senator from Trutnov since 2018.

== Biography ==
Sobotka was born in Vrchlabí, Czechoslovakia (now Czech Republic). He studied Brno University of Technology. He finished his studies in 1988. He worked at Agrostav Dvůr Králové nad Labem and in 1990 he started his own business.

== Political career ==
Sobotka was a member of the Civic Democratic Party in the 1990s and in 1994 he was elected a member of Vrchlabí municipal assembly. He became Mayor of Vrchlabí in 1998. He was an independent candidate nominated by Freedom Union (US). He ran as candidate of US for Senate in 2008 senate election but wasn't elected.

Sobotka ran in 2018 by-election in Trutnov district. He was nominated by Mayors and Independents and supported by the Civic Democratic Party, TOP 09 and KDU-ČSL. Sobotka defeated Hlavatý on 13 January 2018.
