= Opinion polling for the 2013 Czech parliamentary election =

Opinion polling for the 2013 Czech parliamentary election started immediately after the 2010 parliamentary election.

== Percentage ==
Opininon polls (indications of smaller parties can be inaccurate as the average is counted only from surveys reporting those parties)

Published	Company	ČSSD	ODS	TOP 09 STAN	KSČM	ÚSVIT (VV)	KDU ČSL	SPOZ	HV	SZ	DSSS	PIRÁTI	ANO	others	turnout
29 May 2010	Previous election	22.08	20.22	16.70	11.27	10.88	4.39	4.33	3.67	2.44	1.14	0.80	-	2.85	62.6
10 September 2013	TNS Aisa	28.0	9.5	13.0	15.5	5.5	4.5	5.5	<2	5.0	2.0		7.0	4.5	
11 September 2013	Médea	27.4	9.9	10.2	15.7	9.1	4.7	4.1	1.6	3.2	2.0		13.1	1.0	70.0
12 September 2013	Sanep	26.2	9.9	13.9	16.2	3.7	5.2	6.9	3.3				6.1	9.8	56.2
16 September 2013	STEM	30.0	11.0	12.0	15.0	2.3	5.5	7.4	1.0	2.7	1.3		7.7	3.3	59.0
19 September 2013	ppm factum	26.2	8.0	13.8	16.7	2.5	6.7	5.1	1.7	2.3			10.9	6.1	52.7
24 September 2013	CVVM	30.5	7.0	12.5	19.5	2.5	4.5	5.5		2.0			14.0	2.0	62.0
26 September 2013	TNS Aisa	29.0	9.0	10.5	14.5	5.0	5.5	4.0		3.0			11.0	8.0	
27 September 2013	STEM	28.0	12.5	11.0	17.0	2.5	5.5	5.5	1.0	3.3			10.0	4.1	65.0
6 October 2013	TNS Aisa	29.0	8.5	9.5	11.0	4.5	6.5	5.0		3.5			13.0	9.5	
13 October 2013	TNS Aisa	28.5	6.5	11.0	12.5	5.0	6.0	4.5		3.5		2.0	12.5	8.0	
14 October 2013	ppm factum	22.8	7.2	13.2	17.1	3.7	5.9	4.7	<2	3.7	<2	<2	12.1	9.6	62.6
16 October 2013	Médea	22.2	5.5	9.6	11.8	8.2	6.2	3.7		2.9	2.3	3.1	16.9	7.7	71.0
18 October 2013	STEM	25.9	8.6	11.5	13.3	5.9	4.5	2.6	1.0	2.6	0.7	3.1	16.1	4.2	67.0
19 October 2013	Median	25.5	8.0	13.0	16.0	4.0	6.0	5.0		3.0		2.0	13.0	2.0	60.0
20 October 2013	TNS Aisa	23.0	7.0	10.5	14.0	6.0	6.0	4.0		3.0		2.5	16.0	8.0	
21 October 2013	CVVM	26.0	6.5	9.0	18.0	5.0	5.0	3.5		2.0		2.5	16.5	6.0	63.0
21 October 2013	Sanep	23.8	7.5	11.9	16.9	5.3	5.7	5.2	3.5	3.1			11.6	5.5	59.3
26 October 2013	Election results	20.46	7.73	12.00	14.91	6.89	6.78	1.51	0.43	3.20	0.86	2.66	18.66	3.94	59.48

=== Previous polls ===
Opininon polls (indications of smaller parties can be inaccurate as the average is counted only from surveys reporting those parties)

Published	Company	ČSSD	LEV 21	ODS	TOP 09	KSČM	VV	LIDEM	KDU-ČSL	SPOZ	SBB	SZ	DSSS	PIRÁTI	SSO	ANO 2011	Others	Turnout
29 May 2010	Previous election	22.08		20.22	16.70	11.27	10.88		4.39	4.33	3.67	2.44	1.14	0.80	0.74	-	1.3	62.6
31 August 2010	Factum Invenio	20.8		20.1	19.6	13.4	7.9		4.4	3.1		3.9					7.7	62.3
21 September 2010	CVVM	27.0		23.5	16.5	12.5	14.0		2.5	1.0	1.0	1.0					1.0	60.0
22 September 2010	STEM *	27.1		19.3	15.4	13.9	10.8		3.7	1.9	2.6	3.0					2.3	
29 September 2010	Factum Invenio	22.2		20.7	18.1	13.3	8.8		4.3	3.3	3.0	2.4					3.4	62.7
6 October 2010	Sanep	25.2		19.3	17.8	13.6	9.6		2.5	2.3	2.4	1.9					5.4	
7 October 2010	Factum Invenio	22.9		20.2	16.3	13.5	9.6		5.8	2.3		2.5					6.3	62.7
18 October 2010	STEM *	29.9		18.6	14.9	14.1	8.1		3.0	2.3	2.3	2.8					4.0	
25 October 2010	CVVM	31.0		20.5	15.0	12.5	10.0		4.0		2.0	2.5					2.5	59.0
5 November 2010	Factum Invenio	26.0		18.8	17.9	12.0	6.3		5.6		3.1	3.9					6.4	62.7
10 November 2010	Sanep	29.3		18.7	18.1	13.7	8.3		5.7								6.2	
18 November 2010	STEM *	33.3		20.7	16.2	10.6	6.6		4.6	0.7	1.3	2.4					3.5	
24 November 2010	CVVM	33.0		21.0	21.5	10.0	5.0		4.5			2.5					3.0	59.0
2 December 2010	Sanep	32.9		17.1	20.2	12.0	7.1		4.6								6.1	
14 December 2010	STEM *	33.3		18.2	16.4	13.0	6.0		4.2	0.5	1.5	4.0					2.9	
16 December 2010	CVVM	31.0		22.0	19.5	12.0	6.5		3.5			2.5					3.0	58.0
7 January 2011	Sanep	33.3		16.8	19.1	12.5	7.9		4.7								5.7	
19 January 2011	STEM *	33.3		18.8	12.5	14.0	7.8		4.8	0.9	1.3	3.5					3.5	
27 January 2011	CVVM	29.0		26.5	17.0	8.5	9.0		4.5			2.5					3.0	58.0
2 February 2011	Factum Invenio	24.3		20.1	17.1	13.8	7.3		7.5	1.6	2.0	2.8					3.5	60.0
3 February 2011	Sanep	34.1		16.5	18.3	11.8	8.1		3.9								7.3	
14 February 2011	STEM *	32.9		19.3	14.3	11.2	10.5		4.0	1.2	1.4	3.1					2.2	
25 February 2011	CVVM	31.0		22.0	17.0	13.0	8.0		4.0			2.0					3.0	60.0
2 March 2011	Factum Invenio	24.5		19.8	15.4	13.0	6.5		8.8	1.0	2.4	4.4					4.2	61.0
7 March 2011	Sanep	33.8		17.6	17.0	12.9	8.3		4.5								5.9	
17 March 2011	STEM *	34.2		19.6	13.7	12.1	7.8		3.5	1.6	1.6	3.3					2.6	
23 March 2011	CVVM	34.0		22.0	13.5	12.5	9.5		4.5			2.0					2.0	63.0
6 April 2011	Sanep	35.4		18.3	15.3	13.0	7.9		4.8								5.3	
7 April 2011	Factum Invenio	28.4		19.2	13.9	13.6	6.7		5.9	0.5	3.0	4.3					4.5	59.1
18 April 2011	STEM *	36.7		18.5	12.5	12,5	7.0		3.0	1.5	1.8	3.0					3.5	
21 April 2011	CVVM	35.0		22.0	15.5	12.0	5.5		3.5			3.0					3.5	61.0
29 April 2011	Factum Invenio	29.1		20.3	13.9	14.3	4.7		6.6	1.3	2.0	3.3					4.2	58.4
12 May 2011	Sanep	34.3		16.3	14.3	12.9	6.7		5.7								9.8	
16 May 2011	STEM *	37.1		18.4	13.7	14.5	3.1		4.1	1.7	2.0	1.9					3.3	
18 May 2011	CVVM	33.5		21.0	16.5	15.0	3.5		4.5			2.5					3.5	59.0
1 June 2011	Factum Invenio	29.8		20.2	15.4	14.3	3.0		6.0	2.1	1.3	4.4					3.5	55.8
9 June 2011	Sanep	35.3		16.3	15.4	13.3	3.9		5.7								10.1	
20 June 2011	STEM *	34.7		19.1	13.7	14.4	3.8		4.3	1.1	1.4	3.5					3.8	
23 June 2011	CVVM	33.5		21.0	16.0	15.5	3.5		5.5			2.5					2.5	58.0
12 July 2011	Sanep	34.5		17.8	16.3	13.0	3.4		5.3								9.7	
29 July 2011	Factum Invenio	29.1		16.7	14.7	16.3	3.7		5.5	2.6	1.5	5.2					4.7	55.5
14 August 2011	Sanep	34.1		17.6	15.9	13.5	3.4		5.4								10.1	
30 August 2011	Factum Invenio	28.9		18.7	13.6	15.5	3.7		6.5	2.4	1.4	4.0					5.3	55.6
13 September 2011	Sanep	33.2		18.0	14.2	14.3	3.3		5.6								11.4	
21 September 2011	CVVM	35.0		21.5	13.5	16.5	3.5		5.0			2.5					2.5	55.0
23 September 2011	Factum Invenio	29.3		19.6	12.5	16.0	3.3		6.8	1.6	2.0	3.5					5.3	58.3
26 September 2011	STEM *	34.9		17.5	13.4	16.0	4.3		3.7	1.2	2.4	3.4					3.2	
7 October 2011	Factum Invenio	27.3		20.0	12.5	16.0	3.6		6.0	1.9	2.1	4.9					5.3	58.0
14 October 2011	Sanep	30.5		18.8	13.6	14.8	3.9		5.8		3.0						9.6	
19 October 2011	CVVM	32.0		23.5	14.0	15.5	4.0		4.5			2.5					4.0	60.0
24 October 2011	STEM *	32.9		20.4	12.1	14.5	2.6		4.3	1.6	2.1	4.2					5.6	
4 November 2011	Factum Invenio	28.5		19.2	13.7	15.9	2.2		5.9	2.5	1.3	5.4					5.3	58.5
11 November 2011	Sanep	29.6		19.0	13.4	14.5	4.3		5.3								13.6	
14 November 2011	STEM *	33.8		19.3	14.5	14.5	2.9		3.8	1.1	2.0	3.0					5.1	
23 November 2011	CVVM	34.5		21.5	13.5	17.0	4.0		4.5			2.0					3.0	59.0
2 December 2011	Factum Invenio	26.1		18.8	16.0	15.8	2.5		5.4	2.9	1.4	4.0					7.1	57.8
16 December 2011	STEM *	31.1		17.3	12.6	15.8	2.5		5.1	1.9	3.0	4.4					6.2	
16 December 2011	Sanep	28.3	1.4	19.2	13.4	14.5	4.3		5.3								13.6	
21 December 2011	CVVM	34.0		18.5	17.5	17.0	1.5		4.0			2.5					5.0	54.0
13 January 2012	Sanep	29.4		19.0	13.1	14.7	4.7		5.4								13.7	
17 January 2012	STEM *	30.8		18.4	13.5	14.0	4.3		4.8	2.1	2.5	3.7					6.2	
25 January 2012	CVVM	34.0		23.5	15.0	12.5	4.0		4.5			2.5					4.0	60.0
10 February 2012	Sanep	30.1		21.7	14.1	13.9	5.1		5.3			3.0					6.8	
13 February 2012	Factum Invenio	25.5		19.4	15.0	14.9	2.2		4.3	4.4	3.2	4.1					7.2	57.9
21 February 2012	CVVM	32.5		23.5	14.0	15.5	3.5		4.0			3.0					4.0	57.0
8 March 2012	Sanep	27.3		21.2	14.3	14.1	5.1		5.1	3.2		3.0					6.7	
8 March 2012	Factum Invenio	26.1		18.4	13.3	14.4	2.3		4.2	4.7	3.5	3.9			3.6		5.8	59.4
9 March 2012	STEM *	36.1		19.7	11.3	15.1	2.9		4.8	2.2	1.4	2.5					3.9	
21 March 2012	CVVM	35.0		20.0	14.0	16.5	3.0		4.5	2.0		2.0					3.0	59.0
5 April 2012	Factum Invenio	26.9		17.2	13.1	14.9	1.4		6.0	3.3	2.9	4.5			3.1		6.8	60.7
11 April 2012	STEM *	33.5		18.6	11.6	14.5	1.8		4.6	3.4	1.8	3.9					6.5	
16 April 2012	Sanep	26.1		18.9	13.7	14.0	1.8		5.4	5.0							15.1	
18 April 2012	CVVM	37.0		17.5	11.5	20.0	2.0		5.5	2.0		1.5					3.0	63.0
24 April 2012	Median	31.0	3.0	19.5	11.0	13.0	3.0		6.0	3.0	2.5	2.0			3.0		3.0	63.0
3 May 2012	Factum Invenio	27.3	2.0	16.4	10.7	17.6	1.2		7.2	3.4	2.7	5.1			3.1		3.4	61.4
9 May 2012	STEM *	35.3		16.1	9.2	18.9	1.2		4.2	3.0	1.5	3.4					7.3	
11 May 2012	Sanep	26.9		15.6	10.9	16.8	0.9		5.8	5.1	3.0	3.1					11.9	
21 May 2012	Sanep	22.3		14.7	8.7	19.8	0.7		7.9	5.4	3.7	3.2					13.6	
22 May 2012	Median	32.5	2.5	20.5	11.5	14.0	2.0		5.0	2.0	2.5	2.0			2.0		3.5	62.0
23 May 2012	CVVM	36.5		17.0	10.5	21.5	1.5		5.5	1.5		2.5					3.5	58.0
28 May 2012	STEM *	31.6		19.1	10.4	17.8	1.4		5.0	2.8	1.4	4.2					6.4	
29 May 2012	Factum Invenio	26.2	2.9	15.3	10.9	18.1	0.9		6.6	4.8	2.6	5.1			3.7		3.4	61.6
13 June 2012	Sanep	22.7	3.2	14.2	8.7	19.9	1.3		8.1	5.5	3.8	3.2					9.4	
19 June 2012	STEM *	28.1		19.1	12.2	16.2	1.5		5.8	4.2	1.7	4.1					7.1	
20 June 2012	CVVM	31.0		20.0	10.0	20.5	0.5		7.0	3.0		4.5					4.0	61.0
22 June 2012	Median	26.0	2.0	22.5	12.5	18.0	1.0		4.5	2.0	2.5	3.5			2.5		3.0	59.5
28 June 2012	Factum Invenio	22.7	3.1	16.6	13.0	17.1	1.1		6.2	5.5	2.9	4.0			3.1		3.6	61.4
11 July 2012	Sanep	23.1	3.3	14.8	7.9	19.5	1.2		8.3	5.6	4.0	3.4					8.9	
27 July 2012	Factum Invenio	22.7	3.4	17.7	12.6	16.0	1.7		6.1	5.4	3.4	3.6			3.4		4.0	62.0
10 August 2012	Sanep	22.3	3.9	15.8	7.1	20.1	1.5		7.9	5.8	3.8	3.3					8.5	
29 August 2012	Factum Invenio	21.0	2.3	17.3	11.9	15.7	0.9		5.6	7.6	2.3	3.7			2.5		9.2	58.5
11 September 2012	Sanep	20.5	4.1	14.8	7.5	20.2	1.0		7.9	7.1	3.9	3.8			3.0		6.2	
12 September 2012	STEM *	29.5		16.2	10.3	18.1	2.6		3.9	5.8	1.3	3.6					8.6	
20 September 2012	CVVM	31.5		20.5	8.5	21.0	0.5	1.0	6.0	3.0	1.0	1.5		1.0		1.0	4.0	61.0
24 September 2012	ppm Factum	21.5	2.2	17.1	10.3	16.5	2.0		5.2	7.6	2.8	3.8	2.9		2.8		5.5	61.5
25 September 2012	Median	25.5	3.5	21.0	10.5	17.5	2.0		4.0	4.0	3.5	2.0			2.0		4.5	63.5
13 October 2012	2012 Czech regional elections	23.58	0.50	12.28	6.63	20.43	0.24	-	5,82 (+3,01 in coalition)	3.41	1.15	1,75 (+2,87 in coalition)	1.24	2.19	1.48	-		36.89
15 October 2012	STEM *	30.1		16.8	10.9	15.8	1.8		4.3	4.4	1.9	3.8					10.2	
22 October 2012	ppm Factum	22.8	1.9	17.1	11.7	16.4	1.5		5.6	6.4	2.9	3.1	2.2		2.7		5.8	60.4
22 October 2012	CVVM	33.0		16.5	8.5	22.5	1.0		5.0	3.5	1.5	3.5		1.5			3.5	58.0
24 October 2012	Median	28.5	2.0	20.0	10.5	16.5	1.5		4.5	4.0	2.5	3.0					7.0	65.0
8 November 2012	Sanep	22.3	3.8	14.1	5.8	20.1	1.2		7.8	6.7	3.1	3.5					11.6	
14 November 2012	STEM *	31.9		17.4	8.1	15.6	0.6		5.7	4.2	0.9	3.6	1.6	1.6			8.7	
15 November 2012	ppm Factum	25.1	1.3	15.3	11.8	16.5	1.1		6.3	5.3	2.5	3.2	1.3		2.5		7.9 (<1%)	59.7
23 November 2012	Median	27.5		21.0	11.5	17.0	2.0		5.0	5.0	2.0	2.5					6.5 (<2%)	64.5
28 November 2012	CVVM	39.0		16.0	10.0	19.0	0.5	<1	5.0	1.5	<1	3.0		1.5	<1	<1	4.5 (<1%)	58.0
10 December 2012	ppm Factum	25.6	1.2	15.7	10.5	16.3	1.2		6.4	5.7	1.8	3.7	1.8	3.4	2.4		4.4 (<1%)	59.9
13 December 2012	Sanep	25.8	<3	14.2	6.2	19.2	0.7		7.6	6.0	<3	3.5					16.8(<3%)	57.8
17 December 2012	STEM *	32.8		17.2	11.2	15.7	1.1	1.1	5.7	3.3	1.9	4.4					5.6 (<1%)	
19 December 2012	CVVM	36.0		17.0	8.5	22.0	0.5	<1	6.0	1.5	<1	4.0	<1	<1		<1	4.5 (<1%)	57.0
23 December 2012	Median	29.0		22.5	10.5	16.0	2.0		5.0	4.0		2.0			2.0		7.0 (<2%)	67.0
12 January 2013	2013 Czech presidential election	16.11	-	2.46	23.40	-	-	-	4.95	24.21	2.39	3.23	-	-	-	-	23.19	61.31
16 January 2013	ppm Factum	24.0	1.2	17.1	11.1	14.6	1.4		6.7	6.6	2.2	3.8	1.8	2.7	2.6		4.1 (<1%)	61.3
21 January 2013	STEM *	32.9		17.1	11.4	15.8	0.9	1.1	4.7	4.6	1.6	3.0				1.1	5.6 (<1%)	
26 January 2013	2013 Czech presidential election	-	-	-	45.2	-	-	-	-	54.8	-	-	-	-	-	-	-	59.11
30 January 2013	CVVM	38.0	<1	13.0	16.0	17.5	0.5		3.5	3.5		2.0	<1	<1	<1		5.5 (<1%)	62.0
5 February 2013	ppm Factum	24.6	1.1	15.6	14.5	13.8	0.9		7.4	7.4	2.0	3.1	1.5	2.0	2.4		3.6 (<1%)	50.5
7 February 2013	Sanep	26.1	<3	11.8	10.9 +1.3	18.1	0.5		6.6	7.9		2.1					14.7(<3%)	57.8
20 February 2013	STEM *	33.0		14.0	17.1	13.6	1.0		4.8	6.3	2.1	3.0					4.1 (<1%)	59.0
21 February 2013	CVVM	41.0	<1	12.0	17.0	17.0	0.0	<1	3.5	3.5	<1	1.5	<1	<1	<1	<1	4.5 (<1%)	59.0
1 March 2013	Median	33.0		16.0	17.0	14.0	1.0		6.0	3.0		2.5					7.5 (<2%)	64.0
5 March 2013	ppm Factum	25.9	1.7	13.3	16.5	13.6	1.5		7.8	7.5	1.5	2.9	1.7	2.0	1.7		2.5 (<1%)	50.0
12 March 2013	Sanep	27.2	2.8	10.2	13.2 +1.1	17.3	0.8	0.1	5.9	8.3		2.5					10.6(<3%)	56.7
19 March 2013	STEM *	33.0		10.5	17.6	14.7	1.4		5.5	5.5	1.3	3.3		0.8		1.1	4.1 (<1%)	55.0
20 March 2013	CVVM	40.0	0	13.5	16.0	15.5	1.5	<1	3.5	3.5	<1	1.5	<1	0	0	<1	2.5 (<1%)	59.0
21 March 2013	Median	30.5		15.5	17.5	15.0	1.0		5.0	5.5		3.5					7.5 (<2%)	62.5
4 April 2013	ppm Factum	26.6	1.7	13.7	15.2	14.3	1.6		7.0	7.4	1.0	2.7	1.6	1.6	2.0		3.6 (<1%)	50.4
11 April 2013	Sanep	28.3	2.9	9.3	14.5 +1.1	17.4	0.5	0.1	6.1	8.4		2.4					9.O(<3%)	58.3
16 April 2013	STEM *	38.0		12.2	15.8	15.3	0.7		5.6	5.9	0.8	3.3		0.6		0.7	1.2 (<1%)	53.0
24 April 2013	CVVM	40.0	0	12.0	17.0	16.5	0	<1	3.5	5.0	<1	2.0	0	<1	0	<1	4.0 (<1%)	59.0
29 April 2013	Median	32.0		18.0	16.0	15.5	1.5		4.0	5.5		3.0					4.5 (<2%)	59.0
30 April 2013	ppm Factum	26.2	0.3	14.8	15.3	13.6		0.5	7.1	7.7	1.1	3.2	1.3	2.5	2.2		4.2 (<1%)	50.7
13 May 2013	Sanep	27.9	3.0	11.8	12.4 +1.2	17.1	0.4	0.3	6.3	7.6		2.8					9.2(<3%)	55.2
22 May 2013	CVVM	37.0	<1	14.5	14.5	17.0	0.5	<1	5.0	4.0	<1	3.0	<1	<1	<1	<1	4.5 (<1%)	60.0
27 May 2013	Median	32.0		18.5	15.0	15.5	2.0		5.0	4.0		2.5					5.5 (<2%)	61.0
29 May 2013	STEM *	32.0		16.0	15.0	14.0	1.4	0.5	5.5	4.7	1.3	4.4				0.5	4.7 (<1%)	51.0
31 May 2013	ppm Factum	24.9	0.5	14.5	16.2	13.1		0.5	7.7	7.2	1.7	3.3	1.4	2.5	2.0		4.3 (<1%)	50.8
13 June 2013	Sanep	28.5	2.9	13.4	11.7 +1.4	16.9	0.3	0.2	6.5	6.7		2.8					8.7(<3%)	57.4
18 June 2013	STEM *	31.0		16.0	16.0	12.0	2.3		5.0	5.1	0.6	4.5				0.6	5.4 (<1%)	56.0
21 June 2013	CVVM	35.0	<1	13.0	17.0	18.5	0.5	<1	5.5	3.5	<1	2.5	<1	<1	0	<1	4.0 (<1%)	61.0
21 June 2013	Sanep	29.7	3.1	9.1	8.9 +1.2	17.3	0.5	0.2	6.8	7.3	2.8	3.0	2.2	2.2		2.1	3.6(<2%)	53.8
21 June 2013	ppm Factum	29.3	1.8	8.0	15.0	16.1	1.0	1.7	7.5	6.6	1.1	3.5	2.8	1.5	1.3	2.1	2.8 (<1%)	50.5
24 June 2013	Median	32.5		16.0	17.0	16.5	3.0		4.0	3.0		2.5					5.5 (<2%)	61.5
11 July 2013	Sanep	27.2	2.9	8.0	11.0	17.5	0.3	0.1	7.1	7.0	2.1	3.1	2.8	2.6		2.0	3.4(<2%)	53.4
24 July 2013	Median	34.0		13.0	15.0	15.5	3.0		5.5	3.0		2.0					6.0 (<2%)	62.0
15 August 2013	Sanep	27.9	2.0	7.8	13.1	16.7	0.3	0.1	6.4	7.7	3.2	2.8		2.4		2.6	4.8(<2%)	55.2
19 August 2013	ppm Factum *	32.3		9.2	15.4	13.8			4.6	7.7						7.7	7.7 (<1%)	50.5
23 August 2013	Median	32.0		13.5	15.0	15.5	3.5		4.0	5.0		2.5					9.0 (<2%)	63.2
4 September 2013	TNS Aisa	25.4		10.8	9.7	13.7	2.1		4.5	3.7	4.0	2.6				12.0	2.8	70.0
29 May 2010	Previous election	22.08		20.22	16.70	11.27	10.88		4.39	4.33	3.67	2.44	1.14	0.80	0.74	-	1.24	62.6
Published	Company	Č S S D	L E V 2 1	O D S	T O P 0 9	K S Č M	V V	L I D E M	K D U - Č S L	S P O Z	S B B	S Z	D S S S	P I R Á T I	S S O	A N O 2 0 1 1	O t h e r s	T u r n o u t

- Note on varying poll methodology: STEM records all responses (including undecided, won't vote) to percentage. The figures in table are adjusted to correspond with other surveys excluding those undecided or abstaining.

== Seats ==
Seat prediction for Czech parliamentary election for KSČM (red), ČSSD (orange), SZ (green), SPOZ (pink), VV (light blue), KDU-ČSL (yellow), ODS (blue), TOP 09 (purple)

101 seats needed for majority
Published	Company	ČSSD	ODS	TOP 09	KSČM	VV	KDU-ČSL	SZ	SPOZ	ANO
29 May 2010	Previous election	56	53	41	26	24	0	0	0	-
31 August 2010	Factum Invenio	53	50	47	33	17				
22 September 2010	STEM	63	47	39	29	22				
29 September 2010	Factum Invenio	57	52	43	31	17				
6 October 2010	Sanep	59	45	42	32	22				
7 October 2010	Factum Invenio	56	50	38	30	17	9			
18 October 2010	STEM	74	44	35	31	16				
5 November 2010	Factum Invenio	66	47	43	26	9	9			
10 November 2010	Sanep	62	39	40	29	18	12			
18 November 2010	STEM	81	48	37	23	11				
2 December 2010	Sanep	74	38	45	27	16				
14 December 2010	STEM	81	47	37	27	8				
16 December 2010	Factum Invenio	61	47	41	29	10	12			
7 January 2011	Sanep	74	37	43	28	18				
19 January 2011	STEM	81	45	28	32	14				
2 February 2011	Factum Invenio	57	47	40	28	15	13			
3 February 2011	Sanep	77	37	41	27	18				
14 February 2011	STEM	81	45	32	24	18				
2 March 2011	Factum Invenio	61	47	36	28	11	17			
7 March 2011	Sanep	75	39	38	29	19				
17 March 2011	STEM	83	49	29	28	11				
6 April 2011	Sanep	78	41	34	29	18				
7 April 2011	Factum Invenio	72	46	31	31	11	9			
18 April 2011	STEM	92	46	27	28	7				
29 April 2011	Factum Invenio	74	48	33	33		12			
12 May 2011	Sanep	76	36	32	29	15	12			
16 May 2011	STEM	94	46	28	32					
1 June 2011	Factum Invenio	74	48	37	31		10			
9 June 2011	Sanep	82	38	36	31		13			
20 June 2011	STEM	91	50	28	31					
12 July 2011	Sanep	79	41	38	30		12			
29 July 2011	Factum Invenio	73	39	33	39		9	7		
14 August 2011	Sanep	79	41	37	31		12			
30 August 2011	Factum Invenio	72	48	31	37		12			
13 September 2011	Sanep	78	42	33	34		13			
23 September 2011	Factum Invenio	72	48	30	38		12			
26 September 2011	STEM	87	45	30	38					
7 October 2011	Factum Invenio	72	49	30	39		10			
14 October 2011	Sanep	73	45	33	35		14			
24 October 2011	STEM	80	55	30	35					
4 November 2011	Factum Invenio	73	46	31	35		9	6		
11 November 2011	Sanep	71	46	33	36		14			
14 November 2011	STEM	81	49	35	35					
2 December 2011	Factum Invenio	68	46	40	38		8			
16 December 2011	STEM	77	50	34	33		6			
16 December 2011	Sanep	70	48	33	36		13			
13 January 2012	Sanep	72	47	32	36		13			
17 January 2012	STEM	80	55	30	35					
10 February 2012	Sanep	67	48	31	31	11	12			
13 February 2012	Factum Invenio	73	49	40	38					
8 March 2012	Sanep	62	49	33	32	12	12			
8 March 2012	Factum Invenio	75	49	37	39					
9 March 2012	STEM	88	50	25	37					
5 April 2012	Factum Invenio	73	46	32	38		11			
11 April 2012	STEM	88	49	23	35		5			
16 April 2012	Sanep	63	45	33	34		13		12	
3 May 2012	Factum Invenio	72	41	24	42		14	7		
9 May 2012	STEM	92	42	20	46					
11 May 2012	Sanep	66	39	27	41		14		13	
21 May 2012	Sanep	57	37	22	50		20		14	
28 May 2012	STEM	81	48	23	42		6			
29 May 2012	Factum Invenio	72	38	25	45		13	7		
13 June 2012	Sanep	57	36	22	50		21		14	
19 June 2012	STEM	74	50	26	41		9			
28 June 2012	Factum Invenio	59	45	32	43		12		9	
11 July 2012	Sanep	58	38	20	49		21		14	
27 July 2012	Factum Invenio	59	47	31	41		13		9	
10 August 2012	Sanep	56	40	18	51		20		15	
29 August 2012	Factum Invenio	56	46	30	41		10		17	
11 September 2012	Sanep	53	38	19	52		20		18	
12 September 2012	STEM	79	42	23	47				9	
24 September 2012	ppm Factum	60	47	24	42		10		17	
15 October 2012	STEM	78	51	30	41					
22 October 2012	ppm Factum	60	47	29	42		10		12	
8 November 2012	Sanep	58	37	15	52		20		18	
14 November 2012	STEM	87	46	18	39		10			
15 November 2012	ppm Factum	69	39	29	42		13		8	
10 December 2012	ppm Factum	70	41	24	42		14		9	
13 December 2012	Sanep	65	36	16	49		19		15	
17 December 2012	STEM	87	43	25	35		10			
16 January 2013	ppm Factum	65	45	26	36		14		14	
21 January 2013	STEM	84	42	29	36		9			
5 February 2013	ppm Factum	64	40	33	33		14		16	
7 February 2013	Sanep	64	29	27	45		16		19	
20 February 2013	STEM	83	35	42	33				7	
5 March 2013	ppm Factum	66	40	32	31		15		16	
12 March 2013	Sanep	66	25	32	42		15		20	
19 March 2013	STEM	84	22	34	36		8		6	
4 April 2013	ppm Factum	68	33	36	34		14		15	
11 April 2013	Sanep	67	22	35	41		15		20	
16 April 2013	STEM	91	24	34	35		6		10	
30 April 2013	ppm Factum	66	35	38	31		14		16	
13 May 2013	Sanep	67	29	30	41		15		18	
29 May 2013	STEM	83	40	35	34		8			
31 May 2013	ppm Factum	65	35	41	29		15		15	
13 June 2013	Sanep	68	32	28	40		16		16	
18 June 2013	STEM	79	38	40	29		7		7	
21 June 2013	ppm Factum	78	18	37	41		15		11	
11 July 2013	Sanep	72	21	24	46		19		18	
15 August 2013	Sanep	71	20	33	42		16		18	
4 September 2013	Médea	67	26	22	36	18				31
12 September 2013	Sanep	63	21	33	39		12		17	15
16 September 2013	STEM	76	22	31	34		8		14	15
19 September 2013	ppm factum	68	17	32	39		13		7	24
27 September 2013	STEM	72	30	24	41		7		8	18
14 October 2013	ppm factum	62	18	35	44		12			29
18 October 2013	STEM	67	20	28	33	11				41
29 May 2010	Previous election	56	53	41	26	24	0	0	0	-
Published	Company	ČSSD	ODS	TOP 09	KSČM	ÚSVIT	KDU-ČSL	SZ	SPOZ	ANO 2011
