= Freeholder Party of the Czech Republic =

Freeholder Party of the Czech Republic Strana soukromníků České republiky
- Abbreviation: Soukromníci
- Leader: Petr Bajer
- Founded: March 13, 2009.
- Headquarters: Holice
- Ideology: Conservatism
- Political position: Centre-right
- Colours: Yellow
- Chamber of Deputies: 0 / 200
- Senate: 0 / 81
- European Parliament: 0 / 21
- Regional councils: 2 / 675
- Local councils: 14 / 62,178

Website
- http://www.soukromnici.cz/cs/

Freeholder Party of the Czech Republic (Czech: Strana soukromníků České republiky, Soukromníci) is a centre-right conservative political party in the Czech Republic. The party considers itself to be a successor to Czechoslovak Traders' Party and to be inspired by Party of Entrepreneurs, Small Business Owners, and Farmers of the Czech Republic.

== History ==
=== Foundation and cooperation with Civic Democrats ===
On November 21, 2008, the preparatory committee started collecting signatures for creation of a new eurorealist, centre-right political party, which aims to build on the political traditions of the Czechoslovak Traders' Party and Republican Party of Farmers and Peasants. The committee succeeded and as a result the Freeholder Party was founded by Rostislav Senjuk on March 13, 2009, under the name "Freeholder Party of the Czech Republic" (Czech: „Strana soukromníku České republiky“) with abbreviation SsČR. The party described itself as a centre-right conservative party and used as a motto "I have learned that a man has the right and obligation to look down at another man, only when that man needs help to get up from the ground." a quote attributed to Gabriel García Márquez.

The party received 4 544 votes (0.19%) in 2009 European Parliament election and thus won no seat. Following the election, then-prime minister Mirek Topolánek from the Civic Democratic Party reached out to political parties and other groups to the right of center with an offer to cooperate in the 2009 Czech legislative election including the Freeholder Party.

The 2009 legislative election got cancelled by the Constitutional Court of the Czech Republic but the cooperation between the Freeholder Party and the Civic Democrats continued. For the 2010 Czech legislative election the leader of the Freeholder Party cooperated with Civic Democratic advisory group called Economic Group of Experts (Czech: Ekonomická skupina odborníků) and in it endorsed the Civic Democratic Party.

=== Departure from the Civic Democrats ===
The Freeholder Party took part in 2012 regional elections and received 1 seat in Liberec Region. Another member was elected as candidate of Christian and Democratic Union – Czechoslovak People's Party. The party also cooperated with SNK-ED and in no regions ran together with the Civic Democrats. On the 4th congress of the Freeholders Party, members from Ústí nad Labem region criticized then leadership for continued cooperation with the Civic Democrats, they also demanded for the party to broaden its scope and to cooperate with all democratic parties, not only with those on the right. Following the congress, the Freeholders Party announced that the party wants to unite the right to run on one platform in the next Czech legislative election.

In 2013 the Freeholders Party was negotiating with TOP 09 to run on their list. Petr Gazdík from STAN, who were running with TOP 09 at that time said that they also reached out to the Freeholders as well as regional parties to not split votes in the upcoming election. The party was also considering to run again with the Civic Demorats or with ANO 2011 but in the end the party decided to lead their own list.

After talks with major parties failed, the Freeholder Party decided to run on their own list and invited other parties to join them. In South Bohemian Region the list included members of SNK-ED. LIDEM allowed its members to join the Freeholder Party list, one of these being their deputy leader Dagmar Navrátilová. Other parties joining the list was Conservative Party, NOS and Citizens of the Czech Republic. The Freeholder Party received 13 041 votes (0.26%) and no seat in 2013 Czech legislative election.

Following the poor election result, the party leader Rostislav Senjuk stepped down and on December 7, 2013, the party elected Petr Bajer the new leader. On December 22, 2013, the new leadership started talks with newly formed Civic Conservative Party for the 2014 European Parliament elections and municipal elections. The Freeholder Party ran in 2014 European Parliament elections on the list of the Civic Conservative Party. The list received 3 481 votes (0.22%) and no seats.

=== Cooperation with Ivo Valenta and Party of Free Citizens ===
On August 5, 2014, multimillionaire Ivo Valenta announced that he is running in 2014 Czech Senate elections in District 81 - Uherské Hradiště just a few hours before the deadline. Following the successful campaign, Valenta became a sponsor of the party and negotiated an agreement between SsČR and Party of Free Citizens to participate in joint list for 2016 regional elections. The coalition received 2% nationwide but succeeded in Zlín region.

=== Post 2016 development ===
On 21 February 2017 Freeholder Party agreed to participate in 2017 Czech legislative election together with Civic Democratic Party. The coalition received 11% of votes and came second but Freeholders didn't receive any seats.

On 16 July 2025 Freeholder Party announced that they will endorse the Motorists for themselves party in the 2025 Czech legislative election, stating that they want to prevent vote splitting and that the parties agree on economic issues and foreign policy. The party had 12 candidates in all total and they ran in all regions with the exceptions of Plzeň region, Ústí nad Labem region and Moravian-Silesian region. The list received 7% of the vote and came sixth but Freeholders didn't receive any seats.

== Election results ==
=== Chamber of Deputies ===
Year	Leader	Vote	Vote %	Seats	+/-	Place	Notes	Position
2013	Rostislav Senjuk	13,041	0.3	0 / 200	0	16th	Freeholder Party list also included LIDEM, KONS, SNK-ED and NOS	extra-parliamentary
2017	Petr Fiala (ODS)	572,962	11.3	0 / 200	0	2nd	Part of the ODS list	extra-parliamentary
2021	Zuzana Majerová Zahradníková (Tricolour)	148,457	2.8	0 / 200	0	8th	Part of Tricolour–Svobodní–Soukromníci coalition	extra-parliamentary
2025	Filip Turek (independent)	380,601	6.77	0 / 200	0	6th	Part of the AUTO list	extra-parliamentary

=== European Parliament ===
Year	Main Candidate	Vote	Vote %	Seats	+/-	Place	Notes
2009	Jiří Pekárek	4,544	0.2	0 / 22	0	23rd	
2014	Pavel Černý	3,481	0.22	0 / 21	0	22nd	Part of the OKS list
2019	Josef Valihrach	8,720	0.36	0 / 21	0	18th	Soukromníci-Nezávislí coalition (endorsed by ODA)
2024	Libor Vondráček	52,408	1.76	0 / 21	0	10th	Part of the Svobodní list together with PRO PLZEŇ and PRO Zdraví

=== Presidential ===
Election	Candidate	First round result			Second round result		
Election	Candidate	Votes	%Votes	Result	Votes	%Votes	Result
2018	Mirek Topolánek	221,689	4.3	6th			

=== Local elections ===
Election	Votes	%	Seats	+/–
2026	49,787	0.04	26 / 62,178	
