= 2013 Czech parliamentary election =

- 25–26 October 2013

All 200 seats in the Chamber of Deputies 101 seats needed for a majority
- Turnout: 59.44% (▼3.11pp)
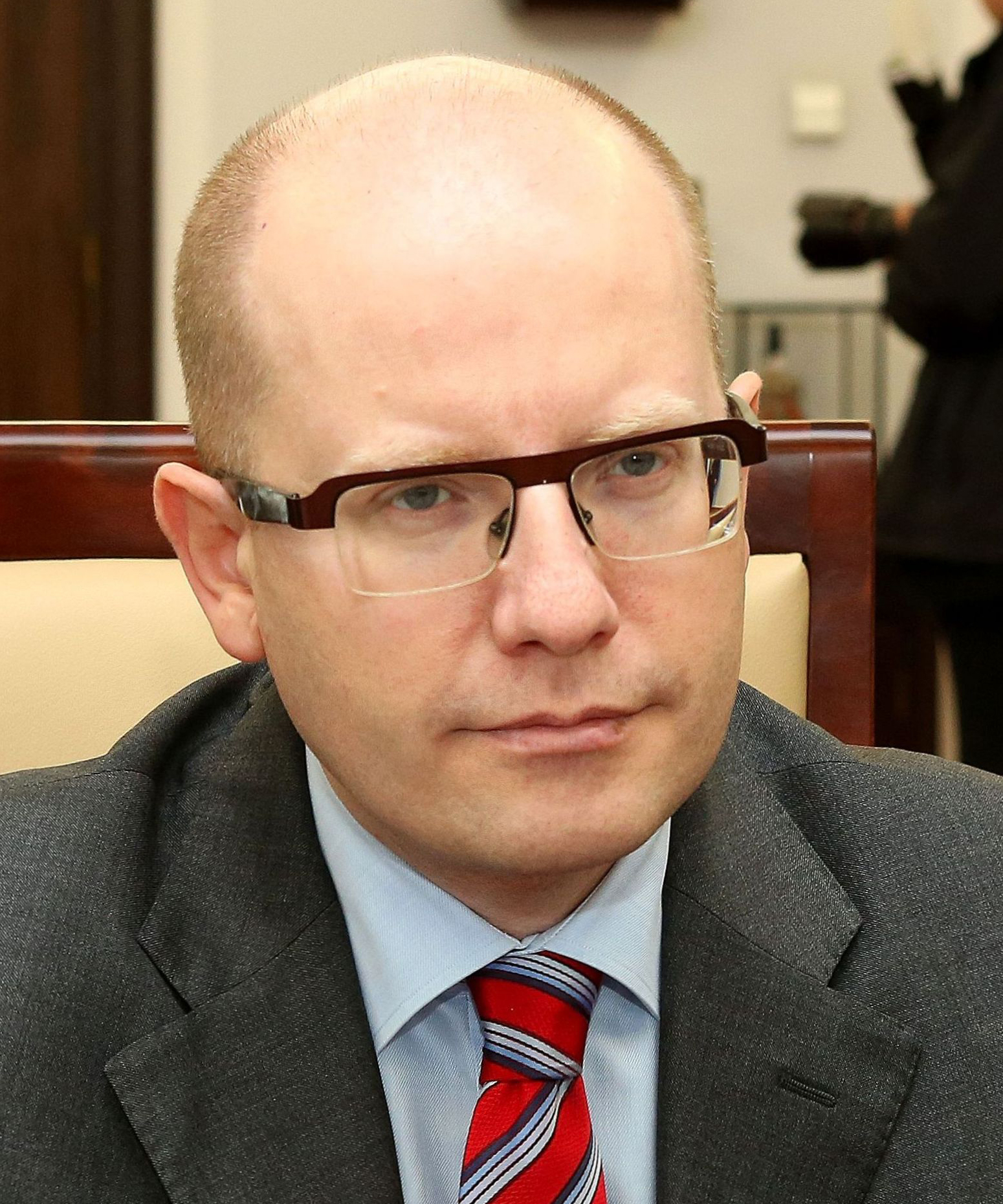

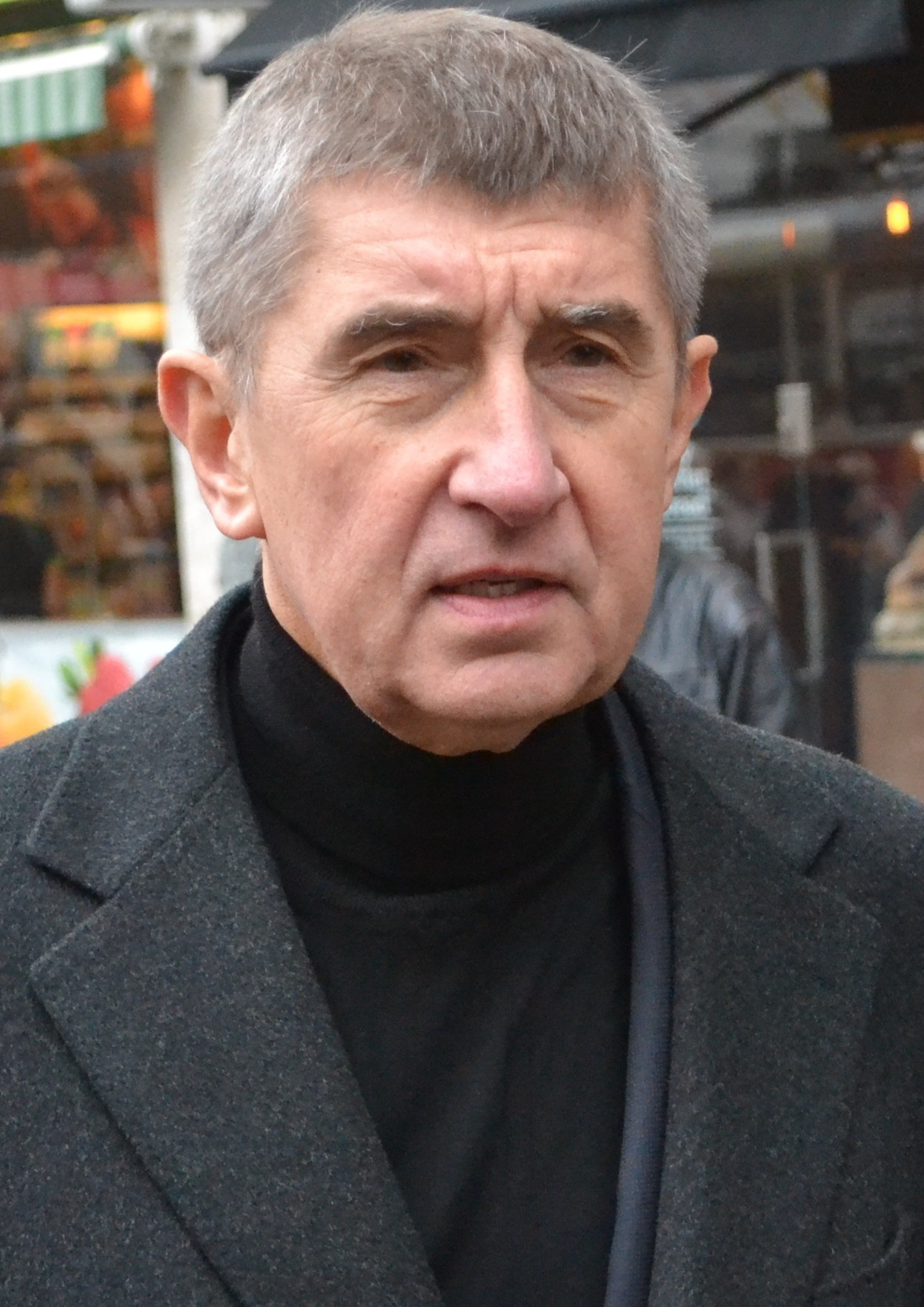

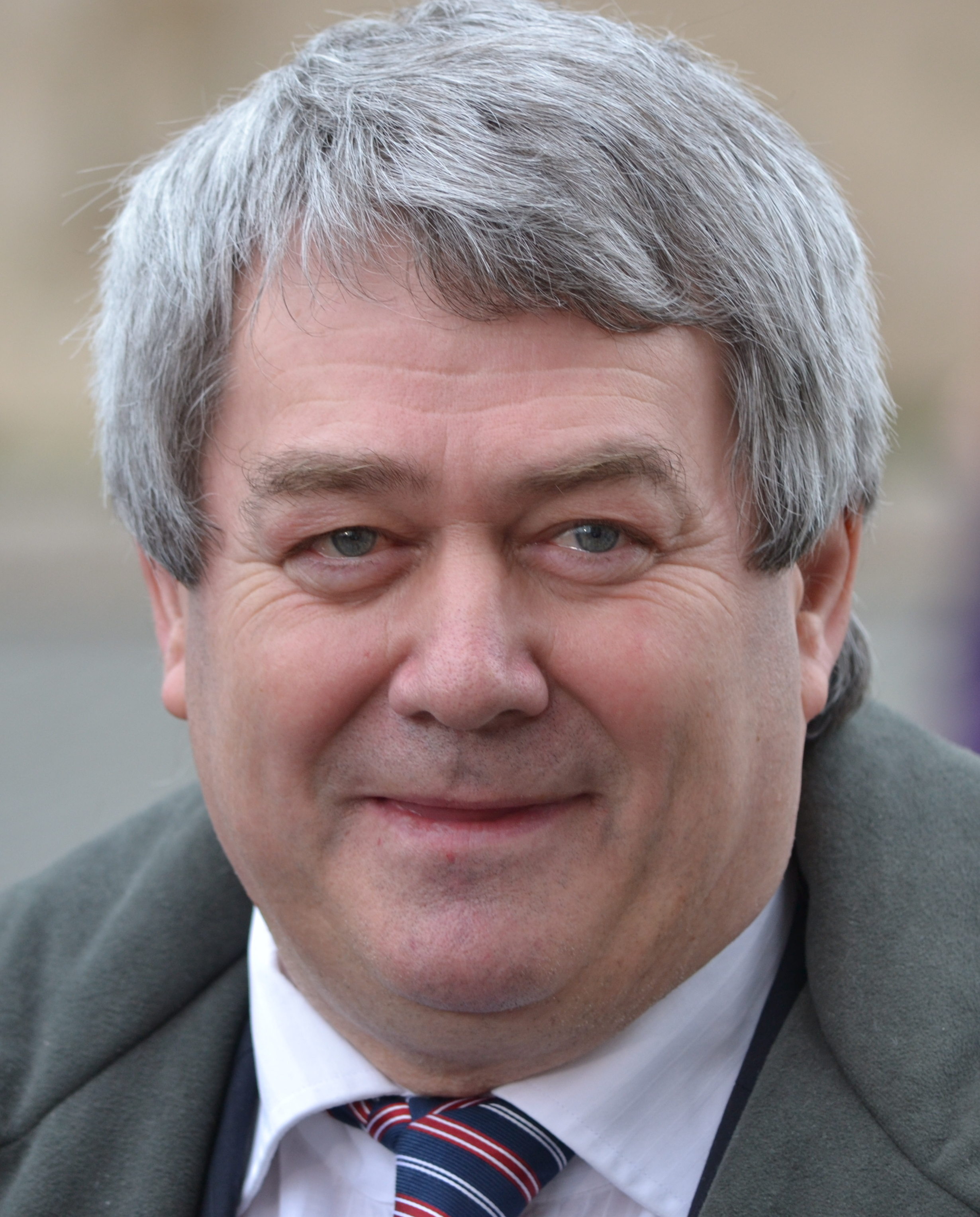

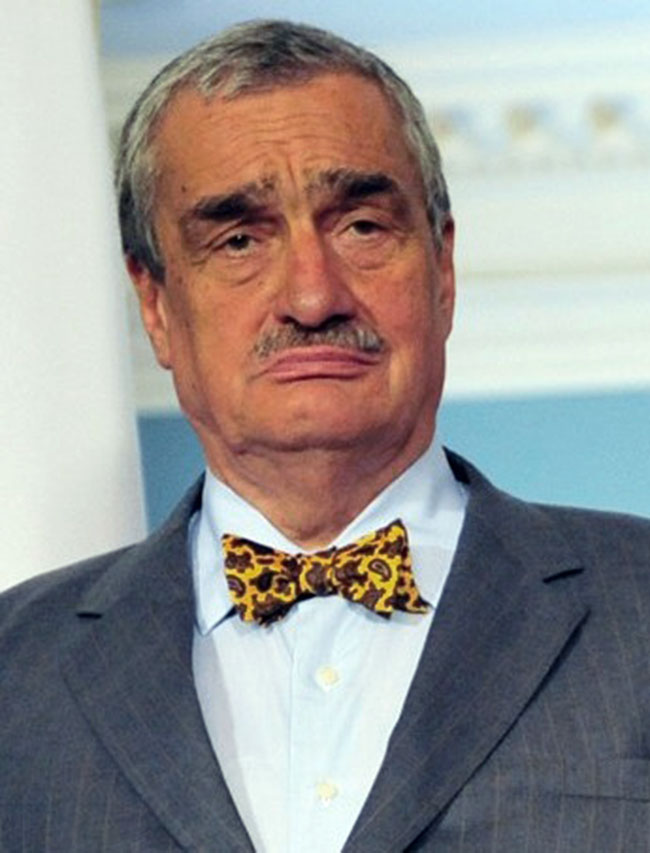

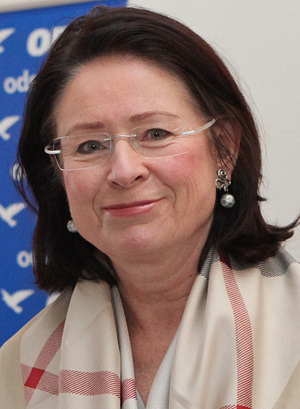

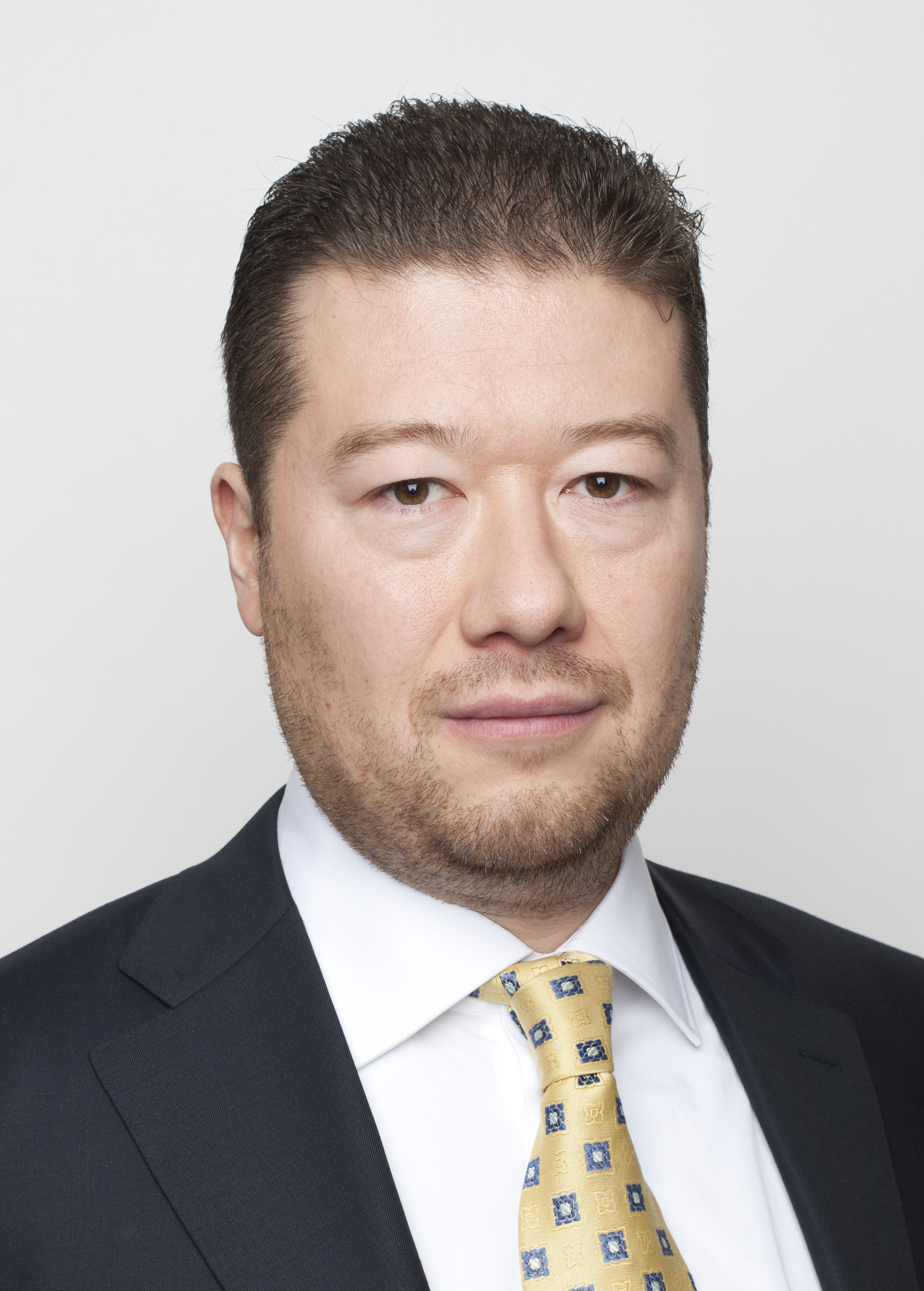

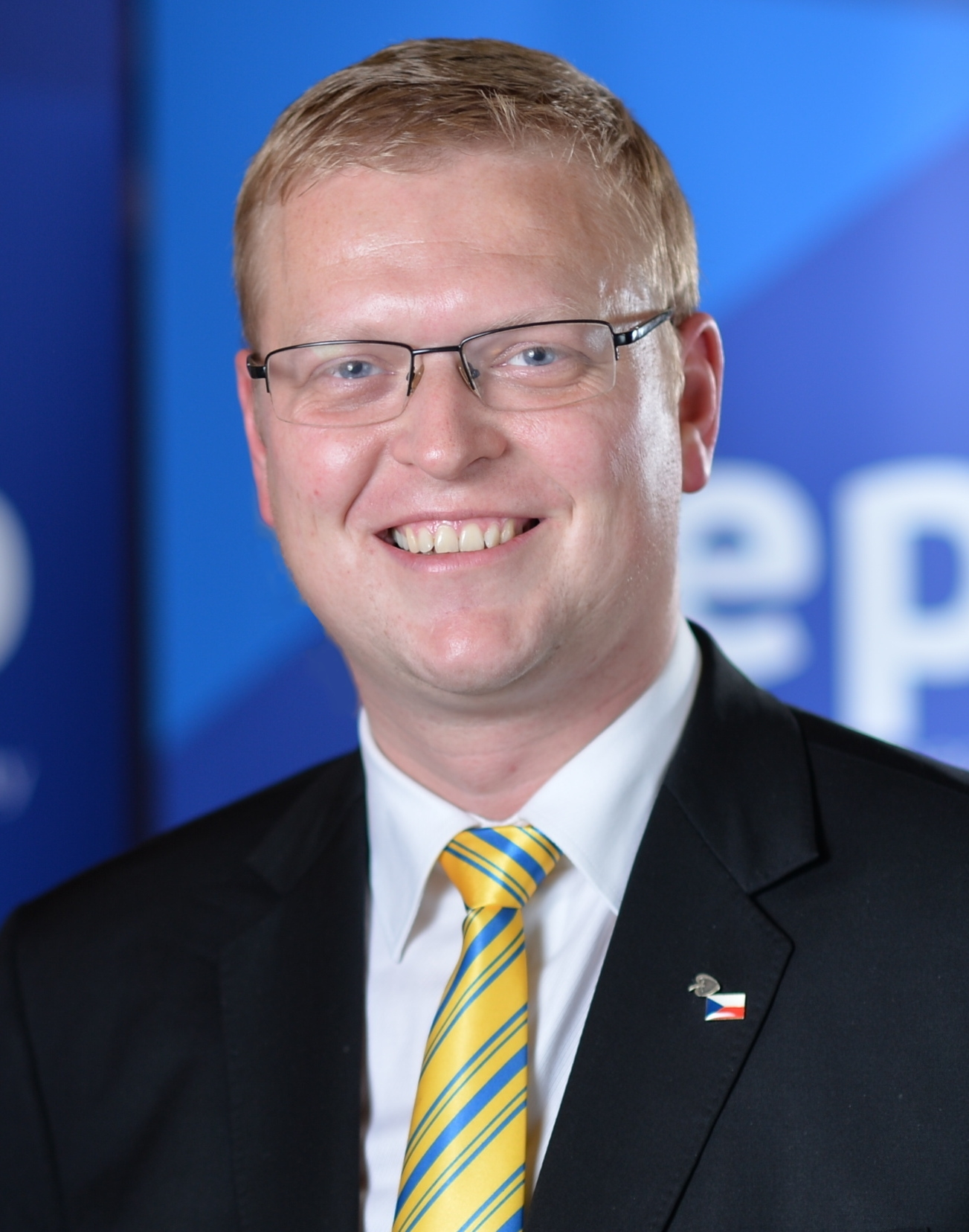
	First party	Second party	Third party
Leader	Bohuslav Sobotka	Andrej Babiš	Vojtěch Filip
Party	ČSSD	ANO	KSČM
Last election	22.09%, 56 seats	Did not exist	11.27%, 26 seats
Seats won	50	47	33
Seat change	▼6	New	▲7
Popular vote	1,016,829	927,240	741,044
Percentage	20.46%	18.66%	14.91%
Swing	▼1.63pp	New	▲3.64pp
	Fourth party	Fifth party	Sixth party
Leader	Karel Schwarzenberg	Miroslava Němcová	Tomio Okamura
Party	TOP 09	ODS	Dawn
Last election	16.71%, 41 seats	20.22%, 53 seats	Did not exist
Seats won	26	16	14
Seat change	▼15	▼37	New
Popular vote	596,357	384,174	342,339
Percentage	12.00%	7.73%	6.89%
Swing	▼4.71pp	▼12.49pp	New
	Seventh party
Leader	Pavel Bělobrádek
Party	KDU-ČSL
Last election	4.39%, 0 seats
Seats won	14
Seat change	▲14
Popular vote	336,970
Percentage	6.78%
Swing	▲2.39pp
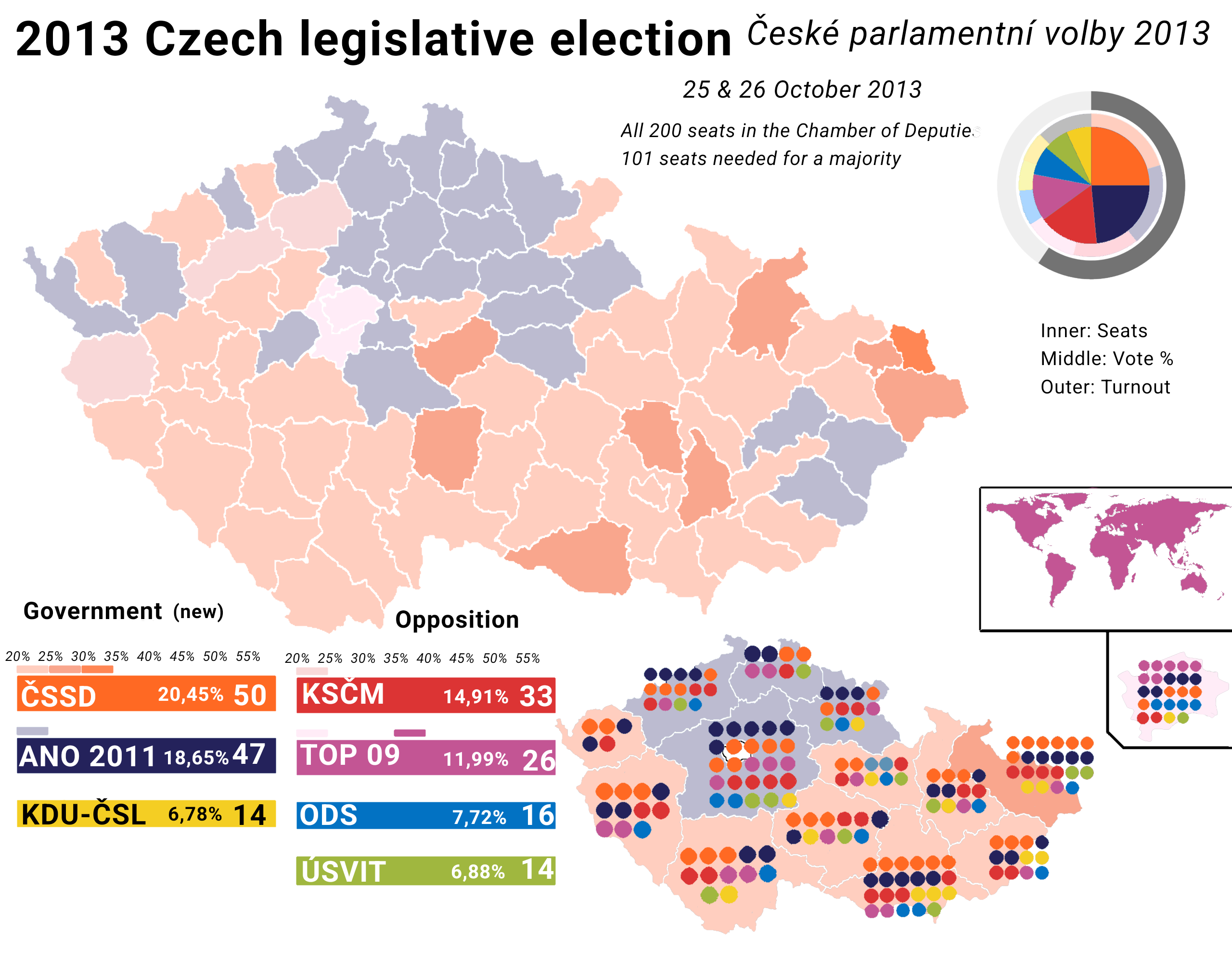
Prime Minister before election
Jiří Rusnok
Independent
Prime Minister after election
Bohuslav Sobotka
ČSSD

Early parliamentary elections were held in the Czech Republic on 25 and 26 October 2013, seven months before the constitutional expiry of the elected parliament's four-year legislative term.

The government elected in May 2010 led by Prime Minister Petr Nečas was forced to resign on 17 June 2013, after a corruption and bribery scandal. A caretaker government led by Prime Minister Jiří Rusnok was then appointed by the President, but narrowly lost a vote of confidence on 7 August, leading to its resignation six days later. The Chamber of Deputies then passed a motion of dissolution on 20 August, requiring new elections to be called within 60 days of presidential assent. The President gave his assent on 28 August, scheduling the elections for 25 and 26 October 2013.

The two parties gaining the most seats were the Czech Social Democratic Party (ČSSD) (50 seats) and the new party ANO (47 seats). The Communist Party of Bohemia and Moravia came third, with an increase in vote share of 3.6%. The two parties from the previous coalition government who were contesting the election, TOP 09 and the Civic Democratic Party (ODS), lost substantial numbers of seats, to finish fourth and fifth, respectively. Two other parties (re)entered the parliament, the new party Dawn of Direct Democracy, and the Christian and Democratic Union – Czechoslovak People's Party.

== Background ==
The previous election in May 2010 resulted in the formation of a three-party centre-right coalition government consisting of the Civic Democratic Party (ODS), TOP 09 and Public Affairs (VV), with 118 seats, led by Prime Minister Petr Nečas.

On 22 April 2012, after a split in VV related to corruption accusations against the party leadership (especially Vít Bárta), ODS and TOP 09 dissolved their coalition with VV, raising the possibility that early elections would be held in June 2012. However, shortly afterwards a breakaway faction of VV, led by Karolína Peake, formed a new party, LIDEM, who replaced VV in the coalition with ODS and TOP 09. The revised coalition controlled 100 seats (ODS=51, TOP09=41, LIDEM=8), and won a subsequent vote of confidence on 27 April 2012 by 105 to 93 votes, with additional support from some independent MPs.

On 17 June 2013, Prime Minister Petr Nečas resigned after a spying and corruption scandal. The Czech Social Democratic Party (ČSSD), the largest opposition party, called for the dissolution of the Chamber of Deputies and a snap election, while the ODS‑TOP09‑LIDEM coalition argued they could still command a majority under Miroslava Němcová (ODS) as the new prime minister, as they proposed to the Czech President. From 25 June 2013, the previous government coalition only held 98 seats (ODS=50, TOP09=42, LIDEM=6), and was therefore dependent upon support from independent MPs. To demonstrate its majority, the ODS-led coalition submitted 101 MP signatures of support to the president, including two extra independents as part of the LIDEM parliamentary group and the independent Michal Doktor, a former ODS member. In an unprecedented move, President Miloš Zeman decided not to accept the coalition's requests, but instead appointed a caretaker government with Jiří Rusnok as new prime minister. Zeman described the new government as a "government of experts", while his critics described it as a "government of Zeman's friends". Former Prime Minister Jan Fischer was named as finance minister. Zeman stated that if the caretaker government could not win majority support in the vote of confidence required by the constitution to take place after 30 days in office, then he would give the ODS-led coalition a second attempt to form a government, provided it could still submit at least 101 signatures of support from MPs.

On 7 August 2013, Jiří Rusnok's caretaker government lost the confidence vote in parliament by 93 to 100 votes, with 7 abstentions. A simple majority was required to unseat the government, which was supported by all MPs from ODS, TOP09 and LIDEM (except two ODS MPs and Karolína Peake of LIDEM, who broke the party line by abstaining). The two dissenting ODS MPs, who were both expelled from the party a few hours after the vote, explained their decision by stating that ODS needed a period of self-reflection in opposition in order to win the municipal elections in 2014.

Karolína Peake resigned as leader of LIDEM after the vote, and TOP 09 stated that due to a lack of support for a reformed ODS‑TOP09‑LIDEM government, as indicated by the results of the confidence vote, they would withdraw their support for this coalition, in favour of early elections. ČSSD and the Communist Party (KSČM) also supported early elections.

Though the constitution of the Czech Republic allows the president two attempts to appoint someone to form a new government, there is no time limit. As such, in theory the caretaker government could be allowed by the president to continue in its interim capacity until new elections took place, despite having lost the confidence vote. The end of the legislative term was scheduled to be May 2014, unless the parliament was dissolved before that date. Nevertheless, the caretaker government decided voluntarily to resign on 13 August 2013, with immediate effect, and the parliament convened on 20 August to decide whether to dissolve the parliament and call for new elections within 60 days, or to request that the president again appoint someone to form a new government.

A vote on dissolution of the parliament was scheduled to take place at 14:00 on 20 August. The four parties who had stated their support for the motion (TOP 09, ČSSD, KSČM and VV) together held more than the 60% majority (120 seats) required to pass the motion of dissolution, according to article 35(2) of the constitution. On 20 August, the parliament approved the motion of dissolution by 140 to 7. The president gave his assent for the dissolution of the parliament on 28 August, and scheduled the elections for 25‑26 October 2013.

== Incumbent parliament ==
The distribution of seats in the Chamber of Deputies on 20 August 2013, immediately before the parliament was dissolved, was as follows:

Distribution of seats in Chamber of Deputies		On 20 August 2013
ČSSD	Czech Social Democratic Party	54
ODS	Civic Democratic Party	48
TOP09	TOP 09	42
KSČM	Communist Party	26
VV	Public Affairs	11
LIDEM	Liberal Democrats	8*
LEV 21 – NS	LEV 21 – National Socialists (Jiří Paroubek and Petr Benda)	2
Úsvit	Dawn of Direct Democracy (Radim Fiala)	1
PSZ	Pro Sport and Health (Josef Dobeš)	1
JIH 12	Jihočeši 2012 (South Bohemian Regional Party: Michal Doktor)	1
–	Independents	6

* Three of these eight members (Martin Vacek, Radim Vysloužil, Jana Suchá) were not members of the LIDEM party itself, but independents who worked with the LIDEM parliamentary group.

== Parties contesting the election ==
- ČSSD announced Bohuslav Sobotka as their candidate for Prime Minister, and ruled out forming any government coalition with either TOP 09 or ODS. Sobotka said he could imagine the formation of a single-party ČSSD minority government if the party won more than 33% of the vote. The party published a 21-point campaign platform, including: higher taxes on businesses and gambling; an income tax increase to 27–29% for people with monthly earnings above CZK 100,000; creation of new jobs; an increase in the minimum wage from 8.5 to 12 thousand CZK per month; pensions guaranteed to increase with inflation; the removal of VAT for medicine and payment for consultations with doctors; more police to be employed in high crime areas; and implementation of a new Civil Service Act.
- TOP 09 leader Karel Schwarzenberg said the main issue for his party during the campaign would be to campaign against Zeman and what he described as his abuse of presidential power. He added that the party had "wanted to launch a European election campaign, but now the defence of parliamentary democracy is the issue". On 12 September, the party published its campaign platform, including: curbing the powers of the president; setting a time-frame for adoption of the Euro; boosting the role of education and culture in society; and encouraging greater individual responsibility for living a healthy life.
- ODS, now led by Miroslava Němcová, published its election manifesto on 11 September, mainly targeting middle class and young voters, with support for under-30s to buy their first home and measures to make it easier for them to start their own business.
- ODS renegades led by ODS MP Boris Šťastný called for the former Czech President and founder of ODS Václav Klaus to establish a new right-wing party based on original ODS values, in order to offer a right-wing alternative to ODS in the election. Šťastný said that ODS had "betrayed their voters by failing to comply with what they promised before the election, and none of the leadership apologized for it or decided to change." He also accused ODS of denying its members' free speech and freedom to express individual opinions. Several other ODS renegades said that they were ready to support such a party, including ODS MP Pavel Bém. On 28 August, Klaus announced that he would not run in the 2013 election. Nonetheless, a new party was announced two days later under the name Cheer Up (Czech: Hlavu Vzhůru) (HV). Headed by Jana Bobošíková, the new party consisted of Bobošíková's Sovereignty – Jana Bobošíková Bloc (SBB), Heal Our Politics (Czech: Uzdravme Naší Politiku) (UNP), Jihočeši 2012 (JIH12), the ultra-conservative initiative Akce D.O.S.T. (Trust, Objectivity, Freedom, Tradition), former ODS members including Michal Doktor and Boris Šťastný, and conservative independent politicians. The political program duplicated the previous program of SBB, including promises to: disengage the Czech Republic from the obligation to adopt the euro; strengthen support for traditional families; and not implement a budgetary debt brake law.
- LIDEM deputy leader Dagmar Navrátilová stated that the party would probably try to form a partnership with another party for the elections. Former leader Karolína Peake said she would remain a member of the party, but recommended that the party should not participate in the parliamentary elections, but instead focus on the following year's municipal elections and the European Parliament election. Three weeks later, the party announced that it would not participate in the parliamentary elections, but would allow members to run for the center-right Freeholder Party.
- The Freeholder Party of the Czech Republic (SSCR), a centre-right party formed in 2008 and led by Rostislav Senjuk, stood lists in all 14 regions, featuring members from other centre-right parties, including LIDEM. The focus of the party's campaign was opposition to progressive taxes, which they said punish diligence for privately employed citizens.
- Public Affairs (VV) decided not to participate in the elections, but some of its MPs, including Vít Bárta, joined the lists of the newly created party Dawn of Direct Democracy. Three VV MPs, including vice president Michal Babák, resigned from their party positions in protest, while announcing that they would continue being members of the party, but focus on running in the following year's municipal and regional elections.
- Dawn of Direct Democracy leader Tomio Okamura announced that his party would be running in all regions, funded by his personal money, and that candidates from VV and other organisations could join the party's lists if they shared the values of the party. Their candidates included former ODS MP Radim Fiala. Its campaign platform included: the introduction of a presidential system of government; the provision of social benefits only for those "who live an upright life"; stricter immigration policies; and a reduction of VAT.
- Pro Sport and Health (PSZ) leader Josef Dobeš entered negotiations for his party to join the election lists of the Party of Civic Rights – Zemanovci (SPOZ), with the main political objective of promoting greater funding for sporting activities. On 3 September, Dobeš announced that he had resigned as chairman of PSZ, and that its committee had approved his proposal for the entire party to join SPOZ for the elections.
- Party of Civic Rights – Zemanovci (SPOZ), led by Zdeněk Štengl, was founded in October 2009 by the former leader of ČSSD Miloš Zeman as a social democratic alternative to ČSSD. When Zeman was elected as president in January 2013, he made a pledge not to interfere in party politics while in office, but SPOZ continued to use his name and political support in their election campaign.
- National Socialists – Left of the 21st century (LEV 21), founded in October 2011 and led by the former leader of ČSSD Jiří Paroubek and former ČSSD MP Petr Benda, published a 20-point political program on 1 September, focused on economic development, anti-corruption measures, welfare and public spending increases, and measures to reduce the cost of living. In protest at an alleged lack of media coverage relative to the party's support in polls, Paroubek withdrew his candidacy on 13 September, stating that LEV 21 would still participate in the elections with his support.
- ANO, a party led by Andrej Babiš and described as centre-right, stood candidates in all regions, with a program focusing on fighting unemployment, improving transport infrastructure, and abolition of immunity and equity returns for politicians and their families. The party ruled out any political collaboration with the Communist Party (KSČM).
- The Czech Pirate Party announced that they would focus on three principles: free access to information, democratic reform of the state, and education.
- The Liberal-Environmental Party (Czech: Liberálně Ekologickou Stranu) (LES), a new party founded on 27 August 2013 and led by Martin Bursík, former president of the Green Party (SZ), was established in protest at SZ's decision to move from a centre to a centre-left position on the political spectrum. The party's steering committee included former environment minister Ladislav Miko, civic activist Matěj Hollan, film director Olga Sommerová and environmentalist Ivan Rynda. The party's supporters included Czech-American economist Jan Švejnar, and businessman Michal Horáček. The party started negotiations to join the KDU–ČSL lists. When these negotiations failed, the party decided not to stand in the elections.
- The Roma Democratic Party (RDS), a left-wing party founded in August 2013 to represent Czech Roma people and led by Miroslav Tancoš, published a political program focusing on promoting the interests of poor Roma people, in particular support for single mothers, pensioners, the ill, and the unemployed, and equal access for Roma children in elementary schools. By 3 September, the party had gathered enough candidates to run in four regions, and through advertisement for additional candidates they still hoped being able to run in all of the 14 Czech regions. Tancoš stated the party was not only working to improve conditions for the Roma minority, but also wanted to help find solutions to the political and economic problems facing the Czech Republic.
- Party of Free Citizens (SSO) announced its manifesto: slim state, dissolution of 26 offices, a referendum on leaving the European Union, citizens' veto and the reduction of bureaucracy. Their election was "Less state, more to citizens!" (Czech: Méně státu, více občanům!).

=== Campaign finances ===
Party	Money spent
ANO	100,000,000
ČSSD	90,000,000 Kč
TOP 09	55,000,000 Kč
ODS	38,000,000 Kč
KDU-ČSL	30,000,000 Kč
SPO	25,000,000 Kč
ÚSVIT	15,000,000 Kč
SZ	13,000,000 Kč
KSČM	11,300,000
Svobodní	3,000,000
Piráti	300,000 Kč

== Opinion polls ==
Published	Company	ČSSD	ODS	TOP 09 STAN	KSČM	ÚSVIT (VV)	KDU ČSL	SPOZ	HV	SZ	DSSS	PIRÁTI	ANO	others	turnout
29 May 2010	Previous election	22.08	20.22	16.70	11.27	10.88	4.39	4.33	3.67	2.44	1.14	0.80	–	2.85	62.6
10 September 2013	TNS Aisa	28.0	9.5	13.0	15.5	5.5	4.5	5.5	<2	5.0	2.0		7.0	4.5	
11 September 2013	Médea	27.4	9.9	10.2	15.7	9.1	4.7	4.1	1.6	3.2	2.0		13.1	1.0	70.0
12 September 2013	Sanep	26.2	9.9	13.9	16.2	3.7	5.2	6.9	3.3				6.1	9.8	56.2
16 September 2013	STEM	30.0	11.0	12.0	15.0	2.3	5.5	7.4	1.0	2.7	1.3		7.7	3.3	59.0
19 September 2013	ppm factum	26.2	8.0	13.8	16.7	2.5	6.7	5.1	1.7	2.3			10.9	6.1	52.7
24 September 2013	CVVM	30.5	7.0	12.5	19.5	2.5	4.5	5.5		2.0			14.0	2.0	62.0
26 September 2013	TNS Aisa	29.0	9.0	10.5	14.5	5.0	5.5	4.0		3.0			11.0	8.0	
27 September 2013	STEM	28.0	12.5	11.0	17.0	2.5	5.5	5.5	1.0	3.3			10.0	4.1	65.0
6 October 2013	TNS Aisa	29.0	8.5	9.5	11.0	4.5	6.5	5.0		3.5			13.0	9.5	
13 October 2013	TNS Aisa	28.5	6.5	11.0	12.5	5.0	6.0	4.5		3.5		2.0	12.5	8.0	
14 October 2013	ppm factum	22.8	7.2	13.2	17.1	3.7	5.9	4.7	<2	3.7	<2	<2	12.1	9.6	62.6
16 October 2013	Médea	22.2	5.5	9.6	11.8	8.2	6.2	3.7		2.9	2.3	3.1	16.9	7.7	71.0
18 October 2013	STEM	25.9	8.6	11.5	13.3	5.9	4.5	2.6	1.0	2.6	0.7	3.1	16.1	4.2	67.0
19 October 2013	Median	25.5	8.0	13.0	16.0	4.0	6.0	5.0		3.0		2.0	13.0	2.0	60.0
20 October 2013	TNS Aisa	23.0	7.0	10.5	14.0	6.0	6.0	4.0		3.0		2.5	16.0	8.0	
21 October 2013	CVVM	26.0	6.5	9.0	18.0	5.0	5.0	3.5		2.0		2.5	16.5	6.0	63.0
21 October 2013	Sanep	23.8	7.5	11.9	16.9	5.3	5.7	5.2	3.5	3.1			11.6	5.5	59.3

== Overseas voters ==
Following a random draw carried out by the State Election Committee, Czechs voting abroad who did not have permanent residency in the country would be included as voters in the Central Bohemian Region.

== Results ==
Party	Votes	%	+/–	Seats	+/–
Czech Social Democratic Party	1,016,829	20.46	−1.62	50	−6
ANO 2011	927,240	18.66	New	47	New
Communist Party of Bohemia and Moravia	741,044	14.91	+3.64	33	+7
TOP 09	596,357	12.00	−4.70	26	−15
Civic Democratic Party	384,174	7.73	−12.50	16	−37
Dawn of Direct Democracy	342,339	6.89	New	14	New
KDU-ČSL	336,970	6.78	+2.39	14	+14
Green Party	159,025	3.20	+0.74	0	0
Czech Pirate Party	132,417	2.66	+1.86	0	0
Party of Free Citizens	122,564	2.47	+1.75	0	0
Party of Civic Rights – Zemanovci	75,113	1.51	−2.82	0	0
Workers' Party of Social Justice	42,906	0.86	−0.24	0	0
Political Change Movement	28,592	0.58	New	0	New
Head Up – Electoral Bloc	21,241	0.43	New	0	New
Sovereignty – Party of Common Sense	13,538	0.27	−3.40	0	0
Freeholder Party of the Czech Republic	13,041	0.26	New	0	New
Koruna Česká	8,932	0.18	+0.11	0	0
National Socialists – Left of the 21st century	3,843	0.08	New	0	New
Active Independent Citizens	1,237	0.02	New	0	New
Right Bloc	1,225	0.02	New	0	0
Roma Democratic Party	609	0.01	New	0	New
Citizens 2011	455	0.01	New	0	New
Club of Committed Non-Party Members	293	0.01	+0.00	0	New
Total	4,969,984	100.00	–	200	0
Valid votes	4,969,984	99.26			
Invalid/blank votes	37,228	0.74			
Total votes	5,007,212	100.00			
Registered voters/turnout	8,424,227	59.44			
Source: Volby

=== Vote share by district ===
CSSD

ANO

KSCM

TOP 9

ODS

Úsvit

KDU-ČSL

== Aftermath ==
=== ČSSD internal conflict ===
Following the election, ČSSD said they were open to talks with all parties about the formation of a government. ANO leader Babis said he could imagine supporting a ČSSD-led government, whether in a coalition or supporting a ČSSD minority government from opposition, but that it was not his preferred option, as he opposed ČSSD proposals for tax increases. He also indicated that he would seek to become Minister of Finance in any coalition cabinet.

Immediately after the elections, two factions emerged in the ČSSD, one supporting chairman Bohuslav Sobotka and the other led by Michal Hašek, ČSSD's leader in Moravia. Hašek, with support from President Miloš Zeman, issued a statement calling for Bohuslav Sobotka to resign as party chairman. ČSSD leaders had already appointed Hašek as the lead negotiator in coalition talks due to take place with other parties. A few days previously, Michal Hašek had declared his loyalty to Sobotka, and endorsed him as leader of ČSSD. ČSSD members organized meetings and rallies against Hašek, and Sobotka compared Hašek to Zdeněk Fierlinger, ČSSD's pro-Communist leader from 1948 who forced the party to merge with the Communist regime. Sobotka was supported by Jiří Dienstbier Jr., the party's most recent presidential candidate, while Hašek was supported by party figures including Jeroným Tejc and Lubomír Zaorálek. According to opinion polls, the situation was perceived by the public as an attempted leadership coup. Subsequently, Hašek and his allies, in the face of popular and party support for Bohuslav Sobotka, resigned their positions within the party and lost influence. A new negotiation team was formed, led by Bohuslav Sobotka, to negotiate with ANO and KDU-ČSL.

=== Government formation ===
On 11 November, ČSSD began coalition talks with ANO and KDU-ČSL. All parties agreed on progressive taxation, abolition of the previous government's social reforms and a law about property origin. However, disagreement remained between ČSSD and KDU-ČSL regarding church restitution.

In late December 2013, leaders of ČSSD, ANO and KDU-ČSL announced that they had reached an agreement on a coalition government. The coalition agreement was signed on 6 January 2014. The parties also agreed on a cabinet, in which ČSSD took eight ministries, ANO seven ministries and KDU-ČSL three ministries. Sobotka became prime minister, with Babiš deputy prime minister and minister of finance, and KDU-ČSL leader Pavel Bělobrádek second deputy Prime Minister. Bohuslav Sobotka's Cabinet was sworn in on 29 January 2014.
