= Cabinet of Petr Nečas =

- 11th Cabinet of Czech Republic
- 13 July 2010 - 10 July 2013
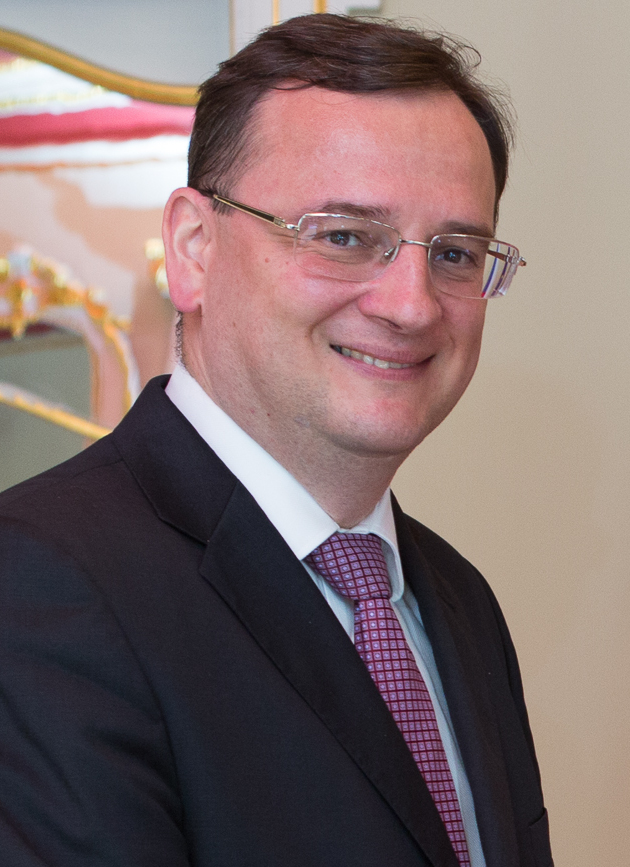
- Petr Nečas, Prime Minister
- Date formed: 13 July 2010
- Date dissolved: 10 July 2013

People and organisations
- Head of state: Václav Klaus; Miloš Zeman
- Head of government: Petr Nečas
- Deputy head of government: Karel Schwarzenberg; Radek John (until 12 March 2012); Karolína Peake (since 12 March 2012)
- No. of ministers: 15-17
- Member parties: Civic Democratic Party (ODS); TOP 09; Public Affairs (until 12 March 2012); LIDEM (since 12 March 2012)
- Status in legislature: Majority government (Coalition)
- Opposition parties: Czech Social Democratic Party (ČSSD); Communist Party of Bohemia and Moravia; Public Affairs (since 12 March 2012)
- Opposition leader: Bohuslav Sobotka

History
- Election: 2010 Czech legislative election
- Predecessor: Fischer
- Successor: Rusnok

The Cabinet of Petr Nečas was formed after the 2010 Czech legislative election. It consisted of Civic Democratic Party, TOP 09 and Public Affairs (later replaced by LIDEM).

== Government ministers ==
Portfolio	Minister	Political party	In office
Prime Minister	Petr Nečas	ODS	June 28, 2010 – July 10, 2013
First Deputy Prime Minister; Minister of Foreign Affairs	Karel Schwarzenberg	TOP 09	July 13, 2010 – July 10, 2013
Deputy Prime Minister	Radek John	VV	July 13, 2010 – May 20, 2011
Deputy Prime Minister	Karolína Peake	LIDEM, formerly VV	July 1, 2011 – July 10, 2013; July 1, 2011 – December 12, 2012 head of the Government Legislative Council
Minister of the Interior	Radek John	VV	July 13, 2010 – April 21, 2011
Minister of the Interior	Jan Kubice	non-partisan	April 22, 2011 – July 10, 2013
Minister of Labour and Social Affairs	Jaromír Drábek	TOP 09	July 13, 2010 – October 31, 2012
Minister of Labour and Social Affairs	Ludmila Müllerová	TOP 09	November 16, 2012 – July 10, 2013
Minister of the Environment	Pavel Drobil	ODS	July 13, 2010 – December 21, 2010
Minister of the Environment	Tomáš Chalupa	ODS	January 17, 2011 – July 10, 2013
Minister for Regional Development	Kamil Jankovský	LIDEM, formerly VV	July 13, 2010 – July 10, 2013
Minister of Defence	Alexandr Vondra	ODS	July 13, 2010 – December 7, 2012
Minister of Defence	Karolína Peake	LIDEM, formerly VV	December 12, 2012 – December 20, 2012
Minister of Defence	Petr Nečas (acting)	ODS	December 21, 2012 – March 18, 2013
Minister of Defence	Vlastimil Picek	non-partisan	March 19, 2013 – July 10, 2013
Minister of Industry and Trade	Martin Kocourek	ODS	July 13, 2010 – November 14, 2011
Minister of Industry and Trade	Martin Kuba	ODS	November 16, 2011 – July 10, 2013
Minister of Health	Leoš Heger	TOP 09	July 13, 2010 – July 10, 2013
Minister of Finance	Miroslav Kalousek	TOP 09	July 13, 2010 – July 10, 2013
Minister of Justice	Jiří Pospíšil	ODS	July 13, 2010 – June 27, 2012
Minister of Justice	Pavel Blažek	ODS	July 3, 2012 – July 10, 2013
Minister of Transport	Vít Bárta	VV	July 13, 2010 – April 21, 2011
Minister of Transport	Radek Šmerda	non-partisan, nominated by VV	April 21, 2011 – July 1, 2011
Minister of Transport	Pavel Dobeš	LIDEM, formerly VV	July 1, 2011 – December 3, 2012
Minister of Transport	Zbyněk Stanjura	ODS	December 12, 2012 – July 10, 2013
Minister of Education, Youth and Sport	Josef Dobeš	VV	July 13, 2010 – March 31, 2012
Minister of Education, Youth and Sport	Petr Fiala	non-partisan	May 2, 2012 – July 10, 2013
Minister of Culture	Jiří Besser	STAN, nominated by TOP 09	July 13, 2010 – December 16, 2011
Minister of Culture	Alena Hanáková	STAN, nominated by TOP 09	December 20, 2011 – July 10, 2013
Minister of Agriculture	Ivan Fuksa	ODS	July 13, 2010 – October 4, 2011
Minister of Agriculture	Petr Bendl	ODS	October 6, 2011 – July 10, 2013
Minister without portfolio, head of the Government Legislative Council	Petr Mlsna	non-partisan, nominated by LIDEM	December 12, 2012 – July 10, 2013
