= Kamil Jankovský =

Czech politician (born 1958)

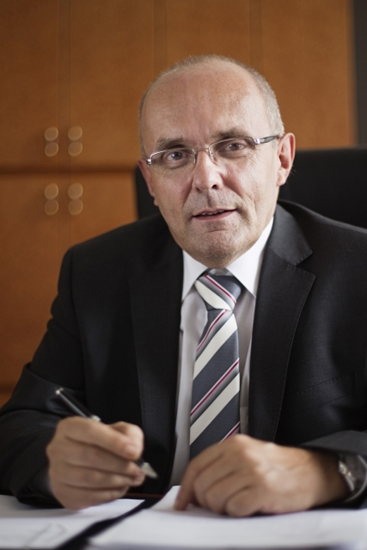
- Kamil Jankovský in 2010

Minister of Regional Development
- In office 13 July 2010 – 10 July 2013
- Prime Minister: Petr Nečas
- Preceded by: Rostislav Vondruška
- Succeeded by: František Lukl

Personal details
- Born: 10 March 1958 (age 68) Prague, Czechoslovakia
- Party: Public Affairs (until 2012); LIDEM (since 2012)

Kamil Jankovský (born 10 March 1958) is a Czech politician, who served as Minister of Regional Development of the Czech Republic from July 2010 to July 2013. He was appointed to Petr Nečas's Cabinet in July 2010.
