= Petr Mlsna =

Czech politician and lawyer (born 1978)

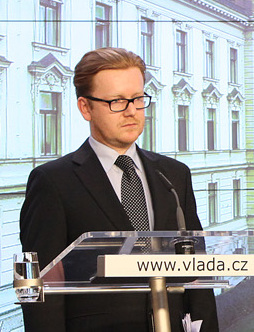

Chairman of the Government Legislative Council
- In office 12 December 2012 – 10 July 2013
- Prime Minister: Petr Nečas
- Preceded by: Karolína Peake
- Succeeded by: Marie Benešová

Personal details
- Born: 13 November 1978 (age 47) Czechoslovakia
- Party: Independent (nominated by LIDEM)
- Education: Charles University
- Occupation: Lawyer

Petr Mlsna (born 13 November 1978) is a Czech politician, who served as Chairman of the Government Legislative Council and Minister without Portfolio of the Czech Republic from December 2012 to July 2013. He was appointed to Petr Nečas' Cabinet as an independent on 12 December 2012.
