= Alena Hanáková =

Czech politician and culture minister

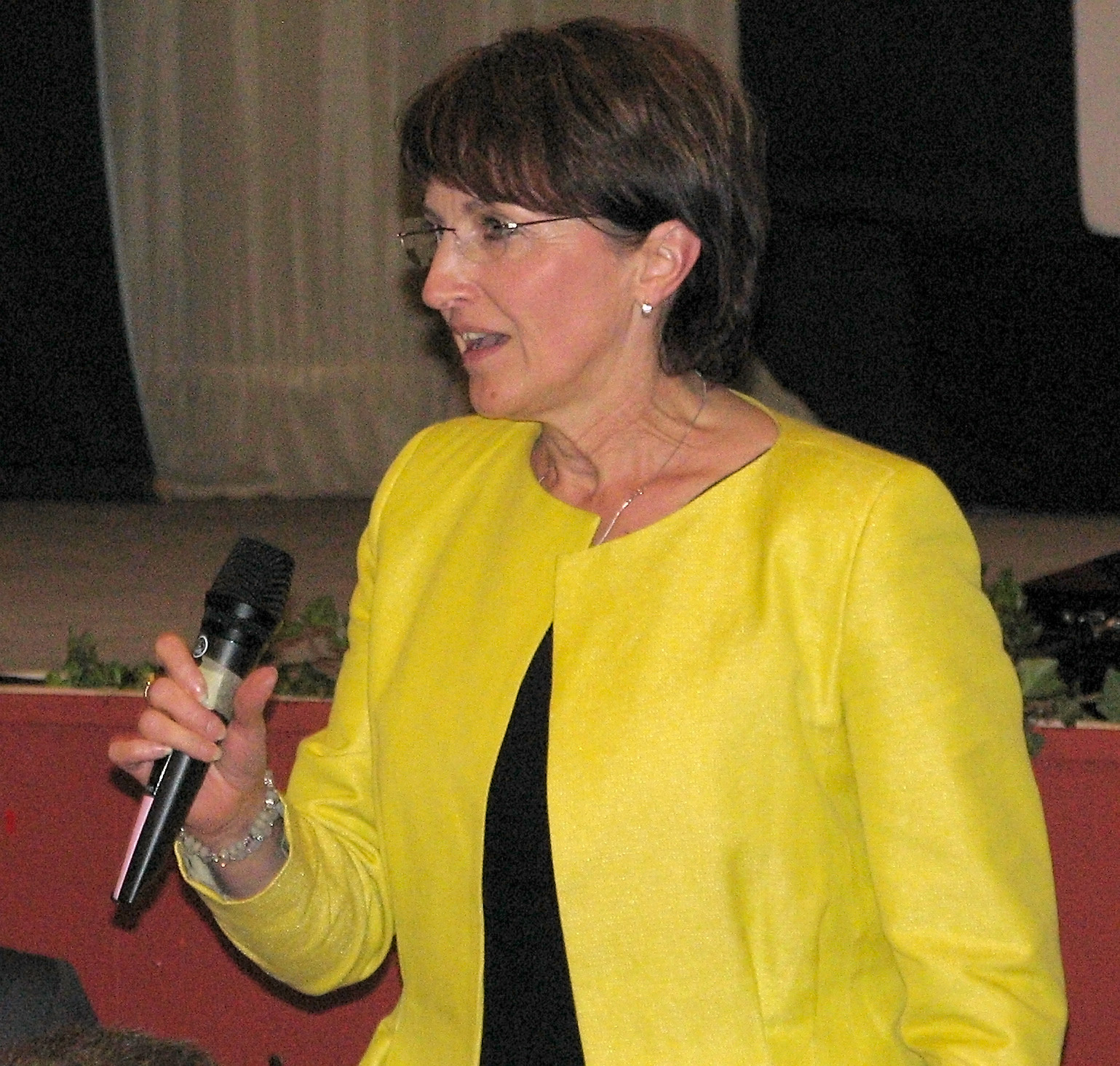

Minister of Culture of the Czech Republic
- In office 20 December 2011 – 10 July 2013
- Preceded by: Jiří Besser
- Succeeded by: Jiří Balvín

Member of the Chamber of Deputies
- In office 29 May 2010 – 28 July 2013

Mayor of Vizovice
- In office 6 November 2006 – 10 November 2010
- Preceded by: Vít Sušila
- Succeeded by: Roman Persun

Personal details
- Born: 1 September 1958 (age 68) Zlín, Czechoslovakia
- Party: Mayors and Independents
- Education: Palacký University Olomouc

Alena Hanáková (born 1 September 1958) is a Czech politician, who served as Minister of Culture of the Czech Republic between December 2011 and July 2013 as part of Petr Nečas' Cabinet. She was appointed on 20 December 2011, becoming the second woman in the government after Karolína Peake.

She served as mayor of Vizovice between 2006 and 2010.
