= Cabinet of Jiří Rusnok =

- 12th Cabinet of Czech Republic
- 10 July 2013 - 29 January 2014
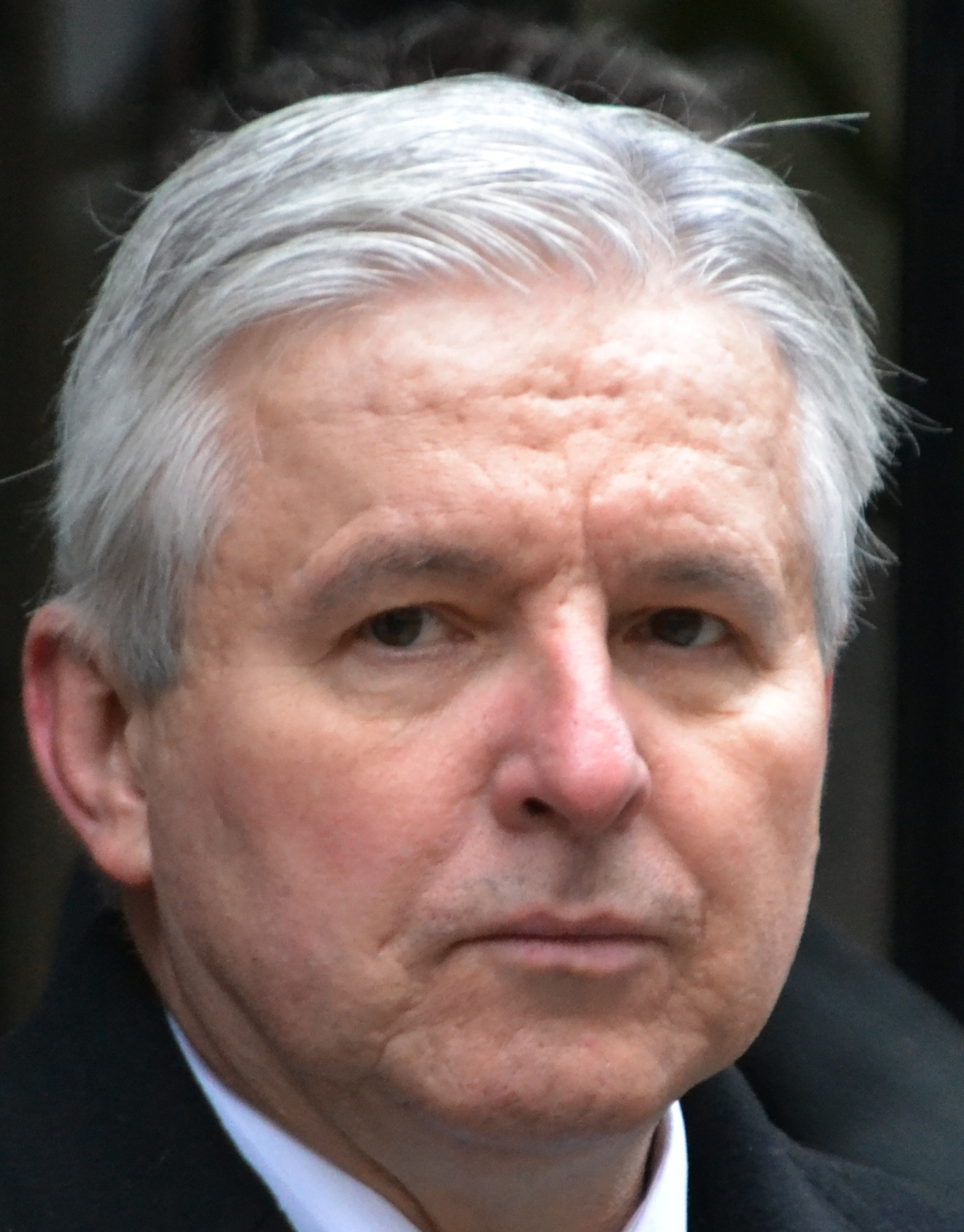
- Jiří Rusnok, Prime Minister
- Date formed: 10 July 2013
- Date dissolved: 29 January 2014

People and organisations
- Head of state: Miloš Zeman
- Head of government: Jiří Rusnok
- No. of ministers: 15
- Member parties: Independent; Supported by: ČSSD (54); KSČM (26); VV (11)
- Status in legislature: Caretaker

History
- Predecessor: Nečas
- Successor: Sobotka

Cabinet of Jiří Rusnok was a Cabinet of the Czech Republic. It was appointed by the President of the Czech Republic Miloš Zeman on 10 July 2013; however, on 7 August, it did not win enough support, losing a confidence vote by 93 to 100. Some parties called for immediate dissolution, leading eventually to elections which took place in October. Rusnok's cabinet then continued in a caretaker capacity. It left the office on 29 January 2014.

== Government ministers ==
Portfolio	Minister	Political party	In office
Prime Minister	Jiří Rusnok	non-partisan	June 25, 2013 – January 29, 2014
Deputy Prime Minister; Minister of Finance	Jan Fischer	non-partisan	July 10, 2013 – January 29, 2014
Deputy Prime Minister; Minister of the Interior	Martin Pecina	non-partisan	July 10, 2013 – January 29, 2014
Minister of Foreign Affairs	Jan Kohout	non-partisan	July 10, 2013 – January 29, 2014
Minister of Defence	Vlastimil Picek	non-partisan	July 10, 2013 – January 29, 2014
Minister of Justice	Marie Benešová	non-partisan	July 10, 2013 – January 29, 2014
Minister of Labour and Social Affairs	František Koníček	non-partisan	July 10, 2013 – January 29, 2014
Minister of Industry and Trade	Jiří Cieńciała	non-partisan	July 10, 2013 – January 29, 2014
Minister of Health	Martin Holcát	non-partisan	July 10, 2013 – January 29, 2014
Minister of Education, Youth and Sport	Dalibor Štys	non-partisan	July 10, 2013 – January 29, 2014
Minister of Agriculture	Miroslav Toman	non-partisan	July 10, 2013 – January 29, 2014
Minister of Transport	Zdeněk Žák	non-partisan	July 10, 2013 – January 29, 2014
Minister for Regional Development	František Lukl	non-partisan	July 10, 2013 – January 29, 2014
Minister of the Environment	Tomáš Podivínský	KDU-ČSL	July 10, 2013 – January 29, 2014
Minister of Culture	Jiří Balvín	non-partisan	July 10, 2013 – January 29, 2014
