= Petr Bendl =

Czech politician (born 1966)

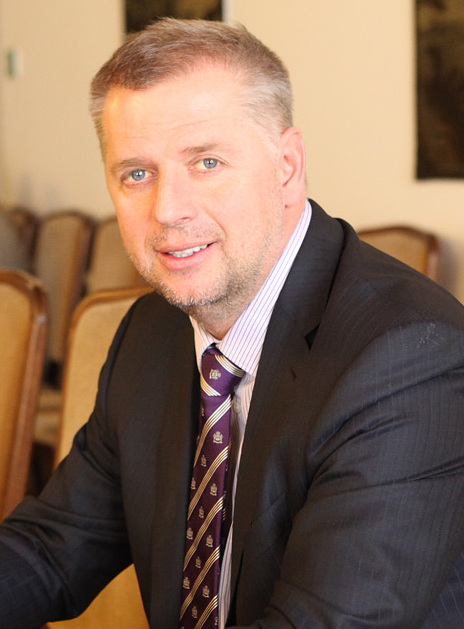
- Bendl in 2013

Minister of Agriculture
- In office 6 October 2011 – 10 July 2013
- Prime Minister: Petr Nečas
- Preceded by: Ivan Fuksa
- Succeeded by: Miroslav Toman

Minister of Transport
- In office 23 January 2009 – 8 May 2009
- Prime Minister: Mirek Topolánek
- Preceded by: Aleš Řebíček
- Succeeded by: Gustáv Slamečka

Governor of the Central Bohemian Region
- In office 18 December 2000 – 24 November 2008
- Preceded by: Office established
- Succeeded by: David Rath

Member of the Chamber of Deputies
- Incumbent
- Assumed office 2 July 2019
- In office 29 May 2010 – 26 October 2017
- In office 20 June 1998 – 28 February 2001

Personal details
- Born: January 24, 1966 (age 60) Kladno, Czechoslovakia
- Party: ODS
- Children: 2
- Education: Technical University of Liberec
- Occupation: Politician

Petr Bendl (born 24 January 1966) is a Czech politician, who served as Minister of Agriculture from October 2011 to July 2013 in Cabinet of Prime Minister Petr Nečas and briefly as Minister of Transport under leadership of Prime Minister Mirek Topolánek. Bendl is a former governor of the Central Bohemian Region after serving two terms. He was Member of the Chamber of Deputies (MP) between 2010 and 2017.

== Early life and education ==
Bendl was born on 24 January 1966 in Kladno.

He is a graduate at Engineering and Textile University in Liberec.

== Career ==
After a short spell as firefighter, he worked as director of Kladno district office and municipal office's departments.

In 1991 Bendl entered the Civic Democratic Party and as the party's leader he was elected member of the Kladno city assembly in 1994 becoming mayor of the city immediately.

Bendl was also vice-president of the Union of Cities and Municipalities of the Czech Republic in 1997–1998.

In 1998 he was elected into the Chamber of Deputies of the Czech Republic (resigned in 2001 due to his regional career) as well into the Kladno assembly and was thus replaced by Milan Volf as the new Kladno mayor, staying only in the city council until 2000.

In 2000 he was elected in the Central Bohemian Region assembly and became first Governor of the region. He defended his seat successfully in 2004.

== Personal life ==
Bendl is married and has two sons - Tomáš and Daniel.
