= Rostislav Vondruška =

Czech politician (1961–2024)

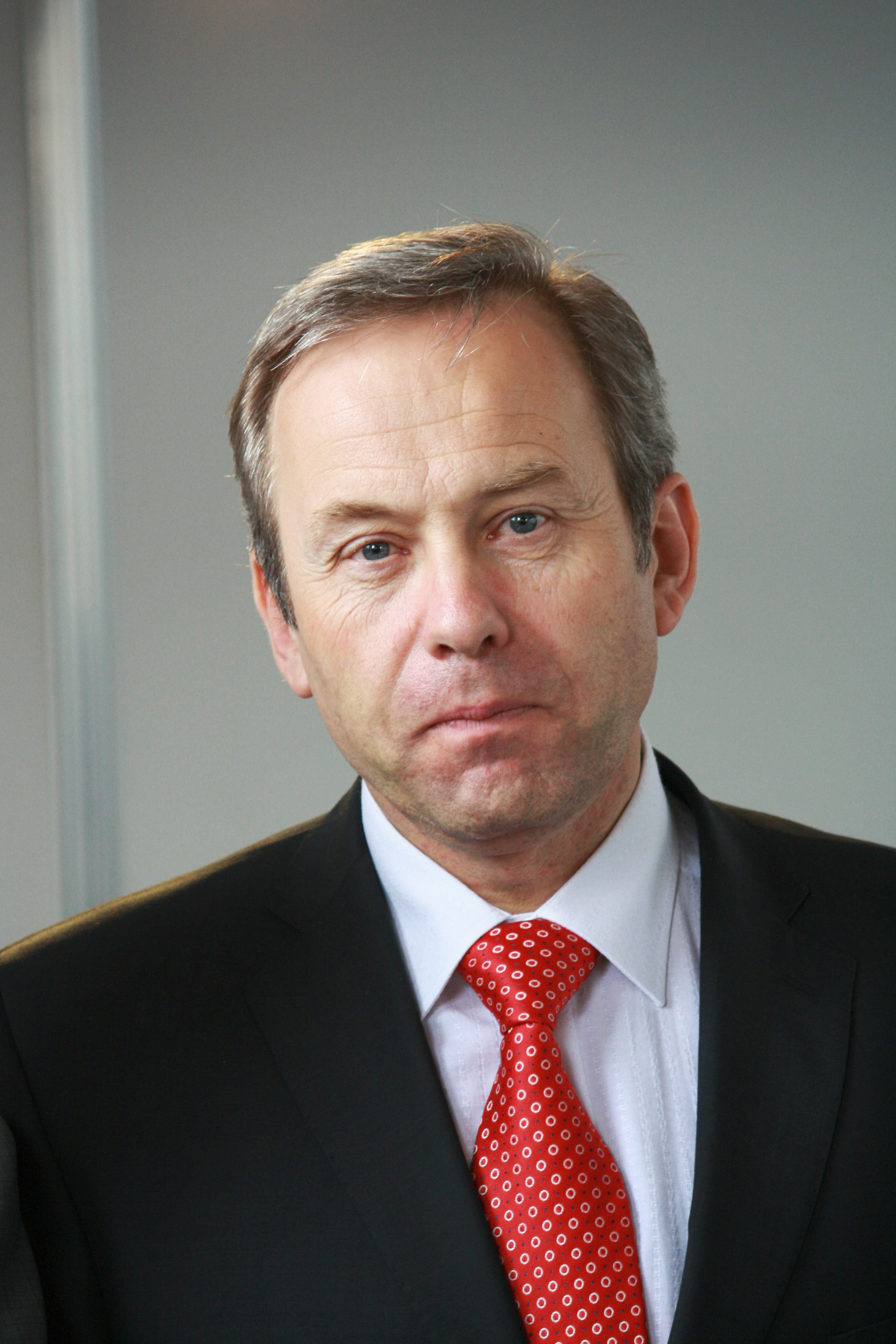

Minister for Regional Development
- In office 8 May 2009 – 13 July 2010
- Prime Minister: Jan Fischer
- Preceded by: Cyril Svoboda
- Succeeded by: Kamil Jankovský

Personal details
- Born: 24 March 1961 Kladno, Czechoslovakia
- Died: 2 July 2024 (aged 63)

Rostislav Vondruška (24 March 1961 – 2 July 2024) was a Czech politician. He was the Minister for Regional Development in the caretaker government of Jan Fischer. Vondruška died on 2 July 2024, at the age of 63.
