= Gustáv Slamečka =

Former Minister of Transport of the Czech Republic

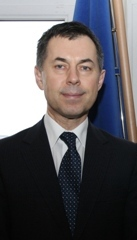

Minister of Transport
- In office 8 May 2009 – 13 July 2010
- Prime Minister: Jan Fischer
- Preceded by: Petr Bendl
- Succeeded by: Vít Bárta

Personal details
- Born: 5 June 1959 (age 66) Nitra, Czechoslovakia (now Slovakia)

Gustáv Slamečka (born 5 June 1959) is a Czech politician of Slovak origin. He was the Minister of Transport in the caretaker government of Jan Fischer.

The first non-Czech national who became a member of the Czech government after the dissolution of Czechoslovakia was born in Nitra, Slovakia and still possesses the Slovak citizenship as his relatives live in Nitra where he regularly returns to visit them. He also obtained his first university degree in Slovakia at the Economic University of Banská Bystrica and later continued his education in the Czech Republic, the United States at the University of Pittsburgh, and Australia. He has lived in Prague since 1996. After years of work in private sector he entered service in Czech administration in 2007. In the beginning of 2009 he became a secretary of the Ministry of transport. At the head of the office he was nominated by the Civic Democratic Party after the fall of the government of Mirek Topolánek and appointed on 8 May 2009.

== Citizenship controversy ==
His lack of Czech citizenship led to controversy over his inclusion in the national cabinet, with the opposition Czech Social Democratic Party labelling it a security risk. His naturalisation in November 2009 rendered the issue moot.

== Personal life ==
Slamečka is openly gay, and living with his partner, head of the Prime Minister's Office Jan Novák, for ten years. Trade union leader Jaromír Dušek's charge that Slamečka is part of a corrupt "homosexual cartel" in control of the Transport Ministry and České dráhy (Czech Railways) has been met with criticism and Slamečka is now pressing charges against Dušek.

The homosexual Žaluda and the homosexual Slamečka are close, and the homosexual Slamečka has ties to the homosexual Novák. There is a horde of about twenty of them at the Ministry of Transport, and another thirty managing the railways, and these people absolutely control Czech Railways. Trust me on that. We need to get them down to 4%, so that we can have equal opportunities. I tell you, I'm afraid to bend over in the hallways over there.

— Jaromír Dušek
