= Tomáš Chalupa =

Czech politician and journalist

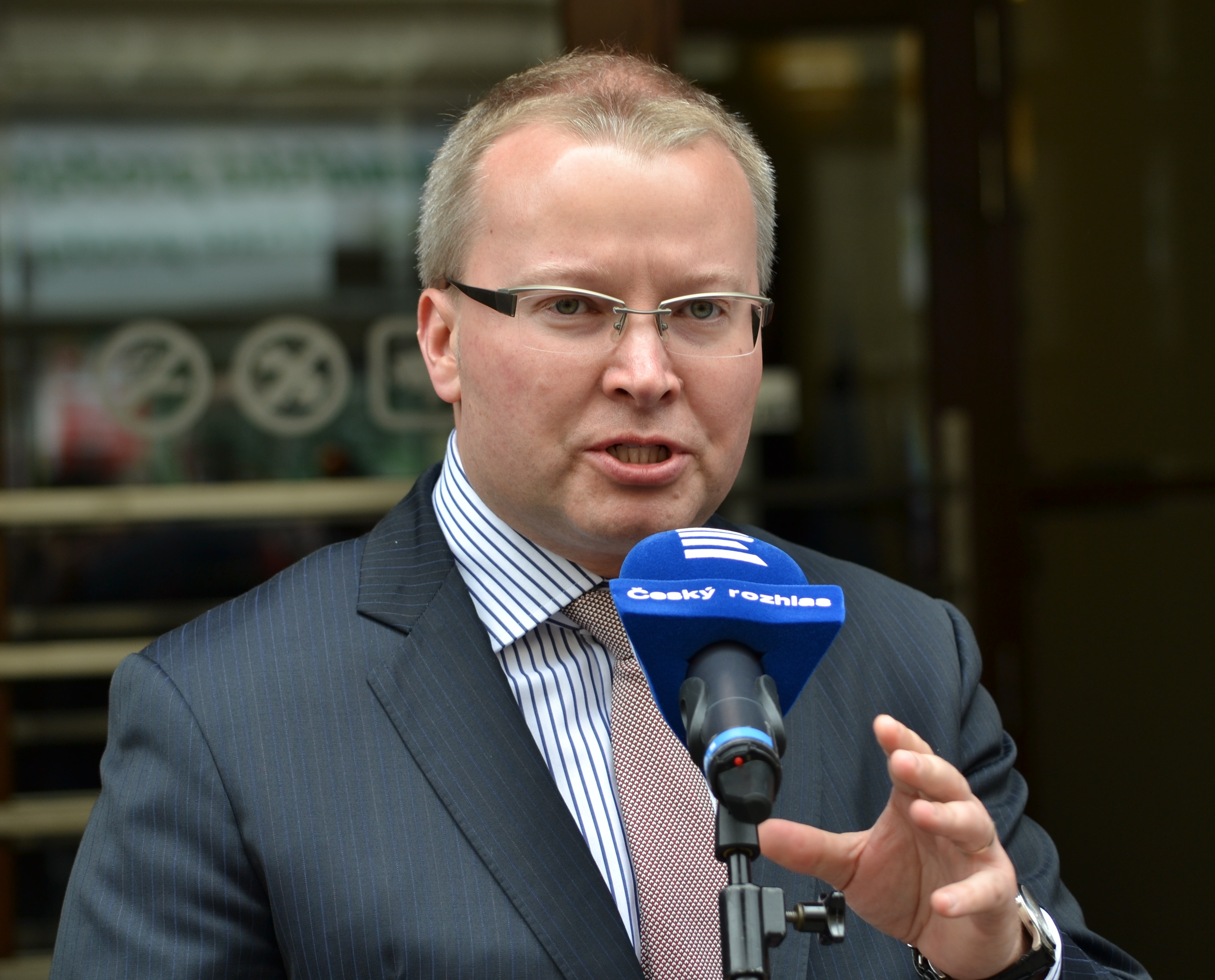
- Tomáš Chalupa in 2013

Minister of the Environment
- In office 17 January 2011 – 10 July 2013
- Prime Minister: Petr Nečas
- Preceded by: Pavel Drobil
- Succeeded by: Tomáš Podivínský

Member of the Chamber of Deputies
- In office 29 May 2010 – 28 August 2013

Personal details
- Born: 3 July 1974 (age 51) Prague, Czechoslovakia
- Party: Civic Democratic Party

Tomáš Chalupa (born 3 July 1974) is a Czech politician who served as Minister of the Environment of the Czech Republic from January 2011 to July 2013. He previously served as mayor of Prague 6 from 2002 to 2011.
