= Karolína Peake =

Czech politician and lawyer (born 1975)

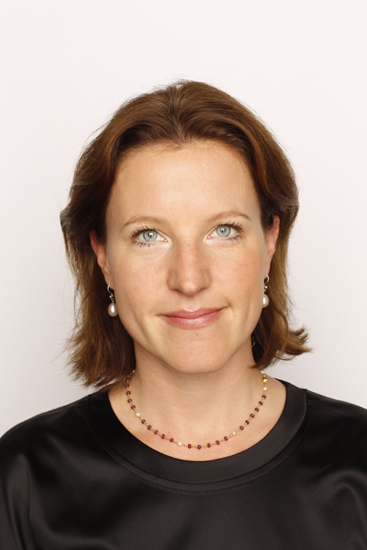

Deputy Prime Minister of the Czech Republic
- In office 1 July 2011 – 10 July 2013
- Prime Minister: Petr Nečas
- Preceded by: Radek John
- Succeeded by: Martin Pecina

Minister of Defence
- In office 12 December 2012 – 20 December 2012
- Prime Minister: Petr Nečas
- Preceded by: Alexandr Vondra
- Succeeded by: Petr Nečas

Chairman of the Government Legislative Council
- In office 14 July 2011 – 12 December 2012
- Prime Minister: Petr Nečas
- Preceded by: Jiří Pospíšil
- Succeeded by: Petr Mlsna

Leader of the Liberal Democrats
- In office 3 November 2012 – 8 August 2013
- Preceded by: established
- Succeeded by: Dagmar Navrátilová

Member of the Chamber of Deputies
- In office 29 May 2010 – 28 August 2013

Personal details
- Born: 10 October 1975 (age 50) Prague, Czechoslovakia
- Party: Independent
- Other political affiliations: Civic Democratic Party (1997–98); Public Affairs (2007–12); LIDEM (2012–13)
- Spouse: Charles Peake
- Children: Two
- Education: Charles University
- Profession: Lawyer

Karolína Peake (née Kvačková; born 10 October 1975) is a Czech politician and lawyer who served as the Deputy Prime Minister of the Czech Republic in the Cabinet of Petr Nečas from 2011 to 2013.

== Career ==
She was a member of the Civic Democratic Party between 1997 and 1998, during her studies at university. In 1999 she graduated from the Faculty of Law at Charles University and married Charles Peake, an Australian manager of Czech-Chinese origin. After this, she worked as a trainee lawyer in the Czech branch of Baker & McKenzie. She gave birth to her sons Sebastian, and Theodor, with whom she took five years parental leave. Thereafter, she began to be involved in local politics, including campaigns to save a local park and to extend local children's playgrounds. In 2006, she was elected to the town council of Prague 1 for Public Affairs.

Peake was elected to the Chamber of Deputies in the 2010 election, representing Public Affairs (VV), but left in April 2012 with seven other MPs. The party she founded after breaking away from VV was named LIDEM, which means "for the people" in Czech, and is also based on the first letters of "Liberal Democrats". She was appointed Minister of Defense in December 2012, but was dismissed by Prime Minister Petr Nečas eight days later, due to criticism of her rapid replacement of ministry deputies.

Peake is a member of the Prague Society for International Cooperation. The Society existed as a network during dissident times. Several of its members were imprisoned by Communist regimes. It became an NGO in 1997 under the presidency of Vaclav Havel. The aim was - and is - to bring former members of the Secret Police to justice and to fight corruption. The Society also forges connections between future leaders and public figures internationally.

== See also ==
- Petr Nečas's Cabinet
