= Dagmar Navrátilová =

Czech politician (born 1966)

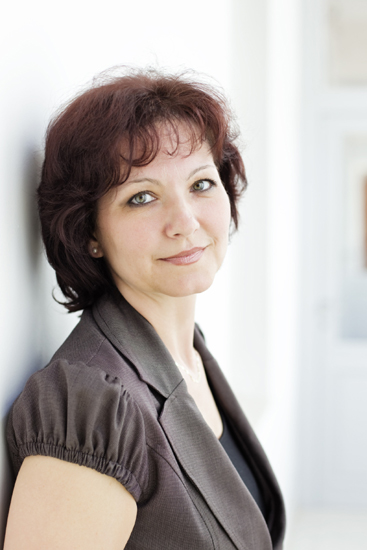

Leader of the Liberal Democrats
- In office 9 November 2013 – 15 February 2014
- Preceded by: Karolína Peake
- Succeeded by: Aleš Hemer

Member of Parliament for Olomouc
- In office 29 May 2010 – 28 August 2013

Personal details
- Born: 18 July 1966 (age 60) Olomouc, Czechoslovakia
- Party: LIDEM (2012–present)
- Other political affiliations: Public Affairs (2009–12)
- Children: Three
- Education: Palacký University

Dagmar Navrátilová (born 18 July 1966) is a Czech politician. She was elected to the Chamber of Deputies in the 2010 election, representing Public Affairs (VV), but broke away with party leader Karolína Peake and five other politicians to form a new party. The new party founded after breaking away from VV was named LIDEM, which means "for the people" in Czech, and is also based on the first letters of "Liberal Democrats".
