= 2014 Czech municipal elections =

- 10–11 October 2014

All 62,300 seats in municipal councils
- Turnout: 44.46%
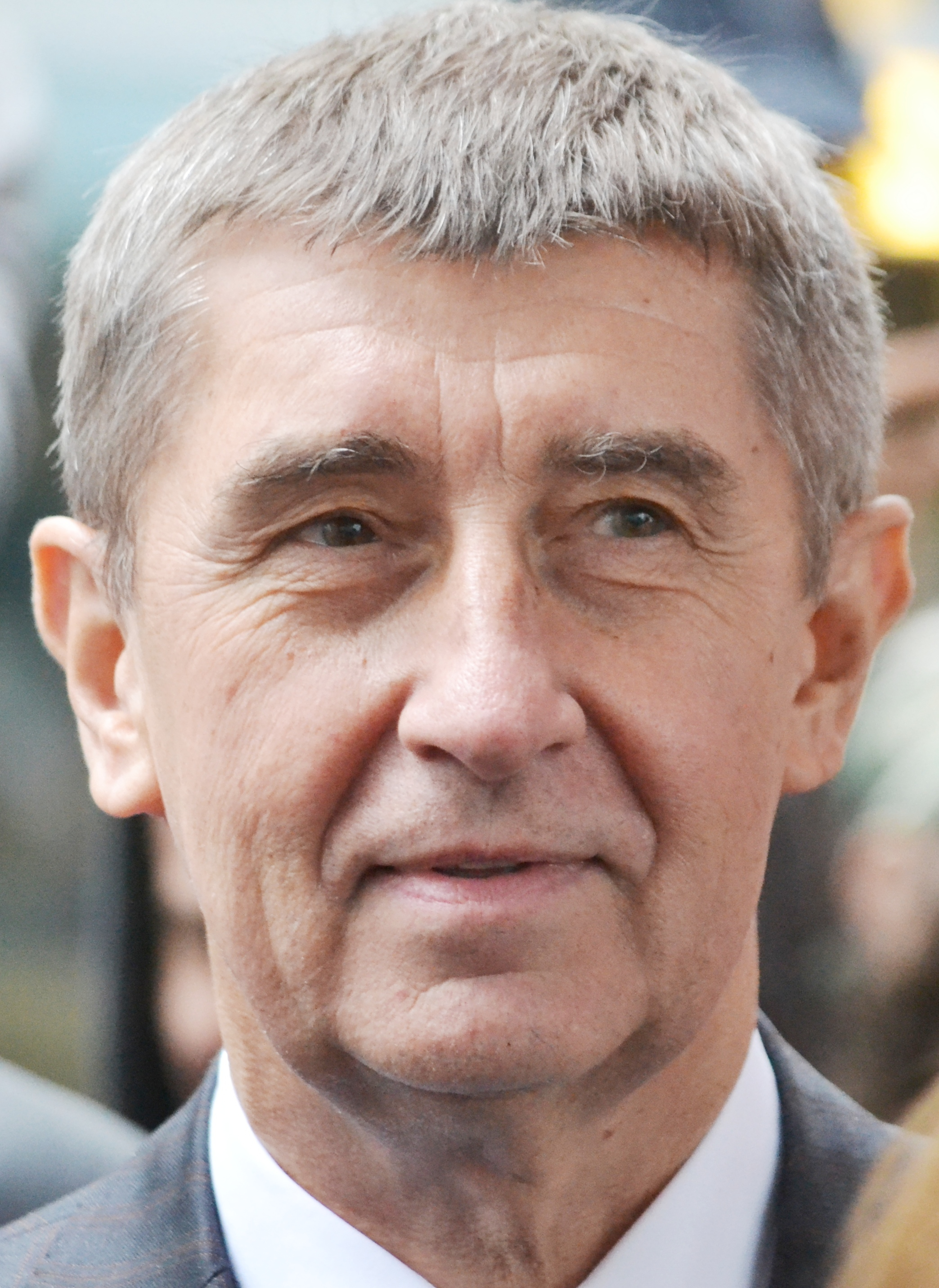

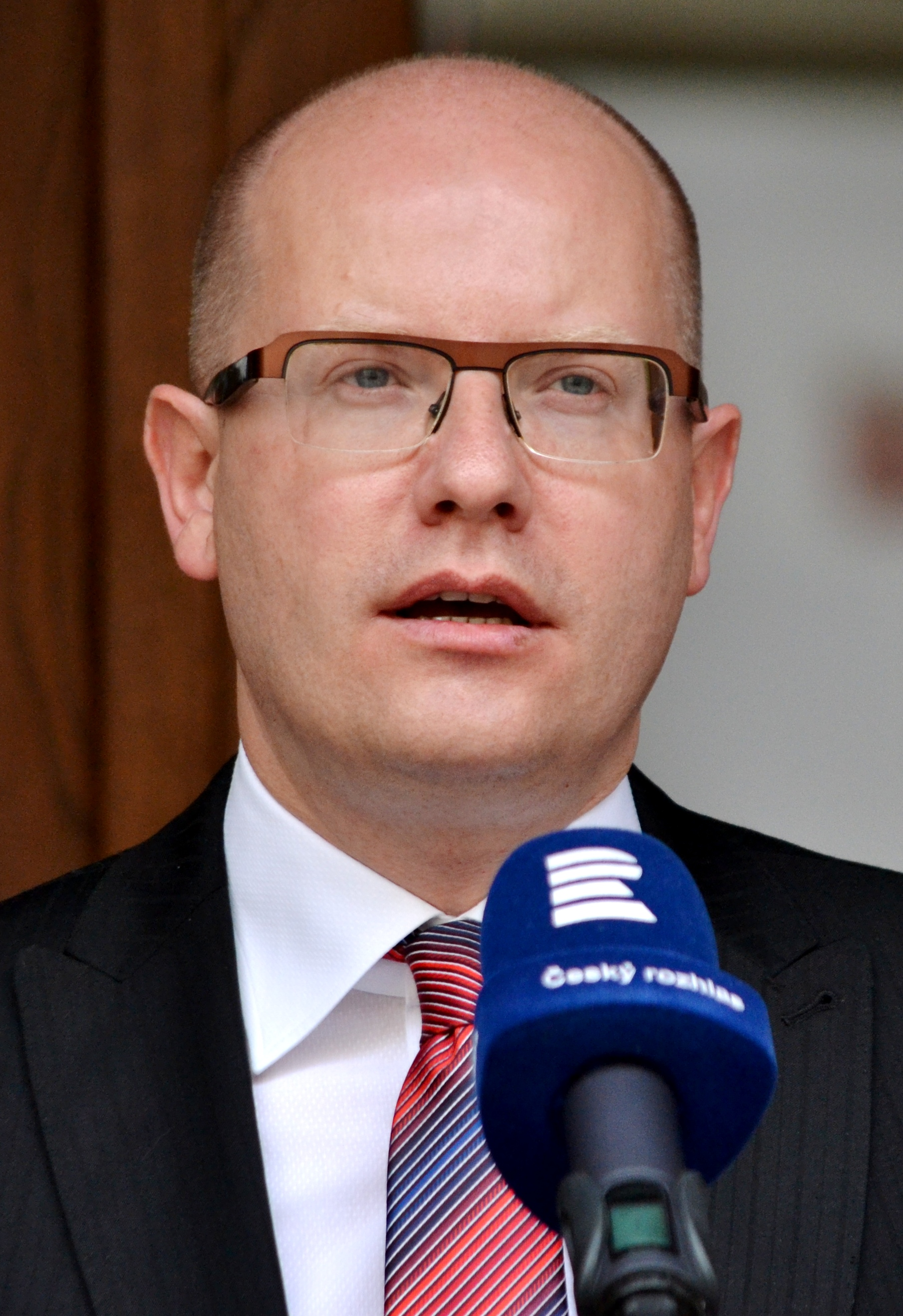

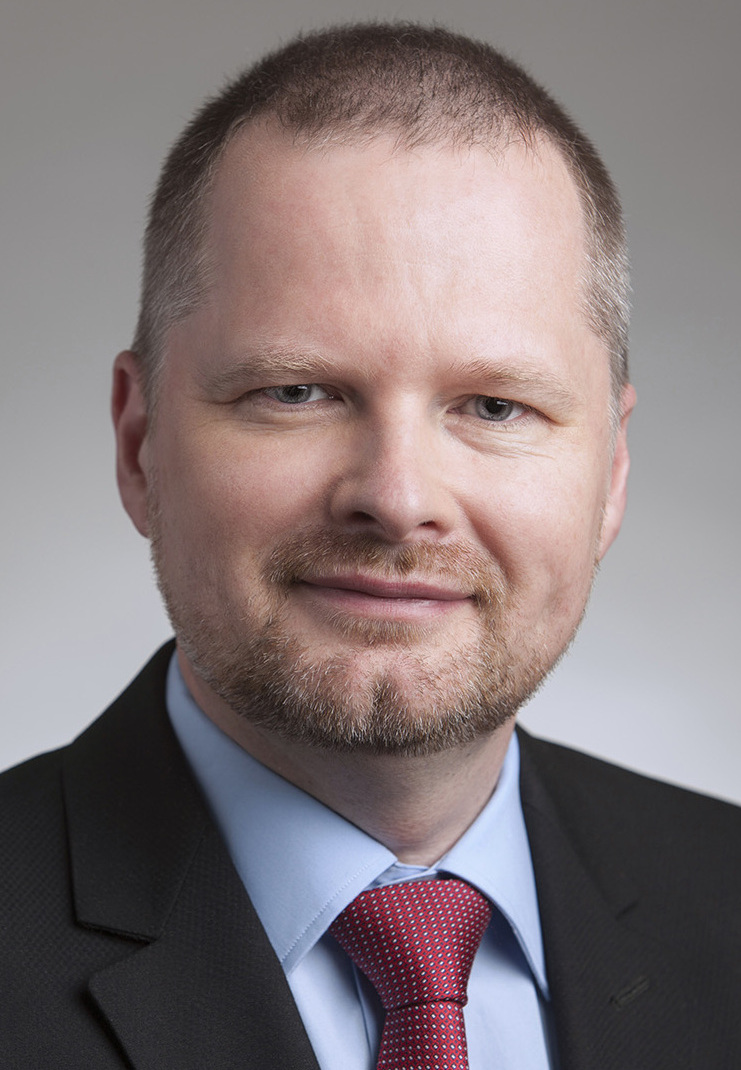

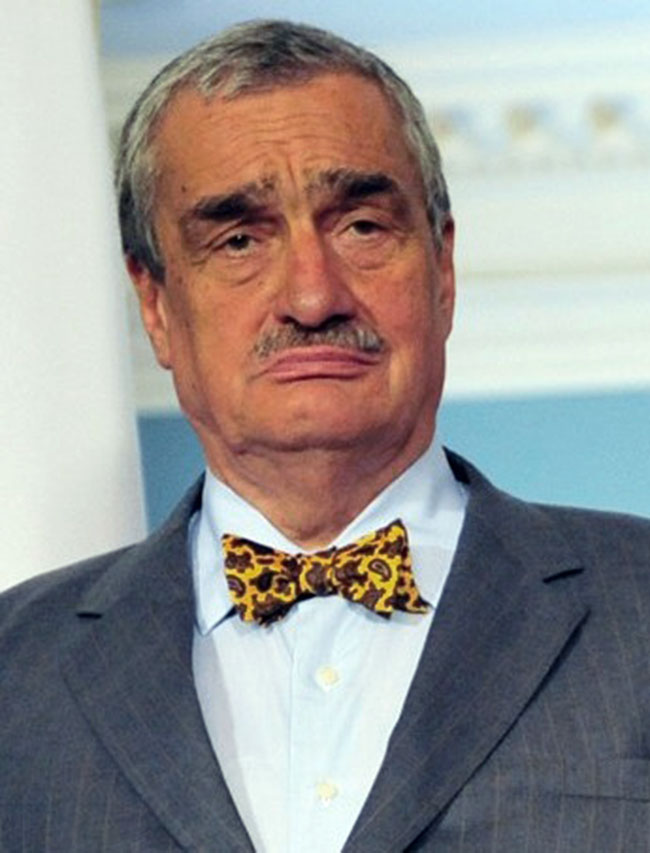

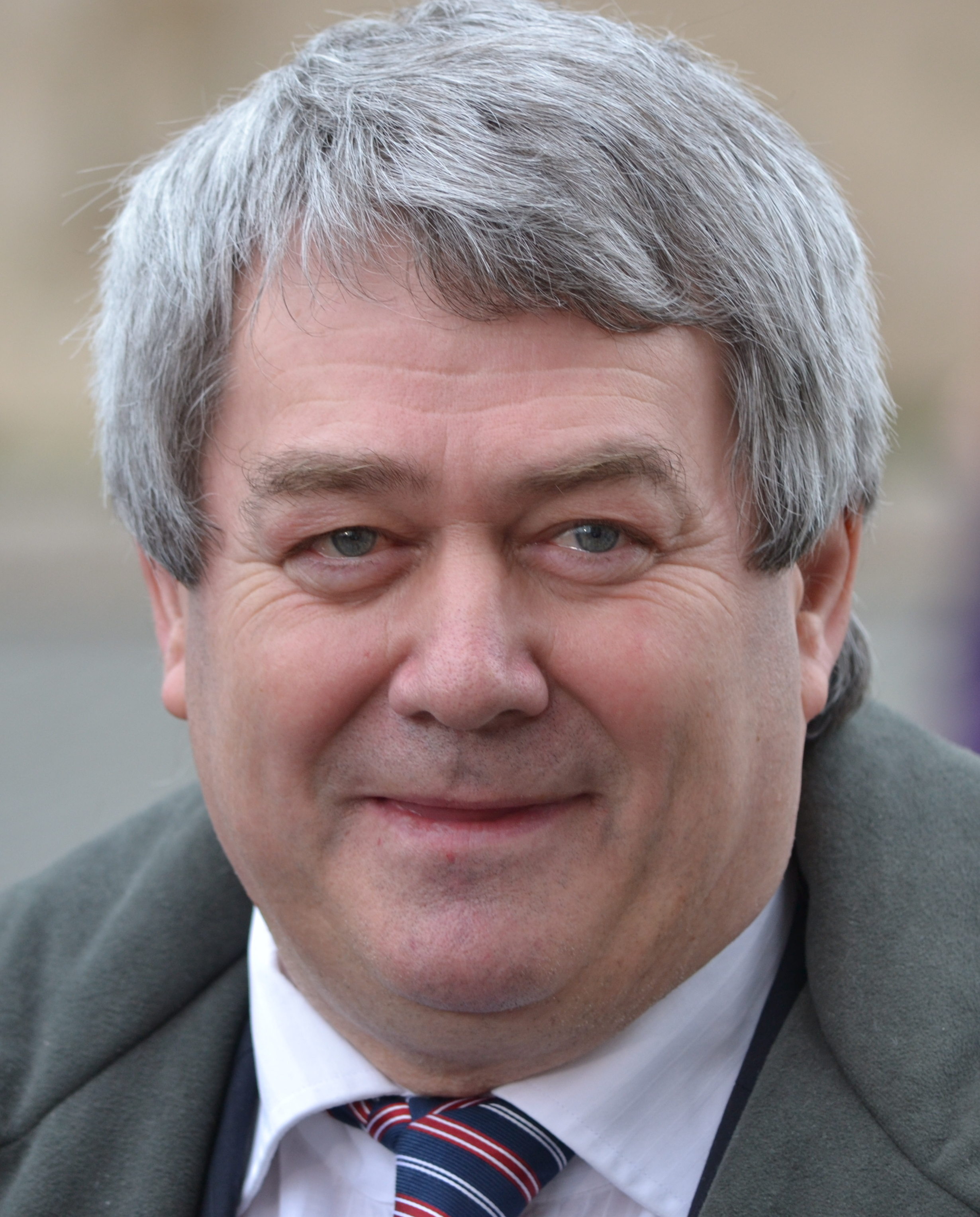

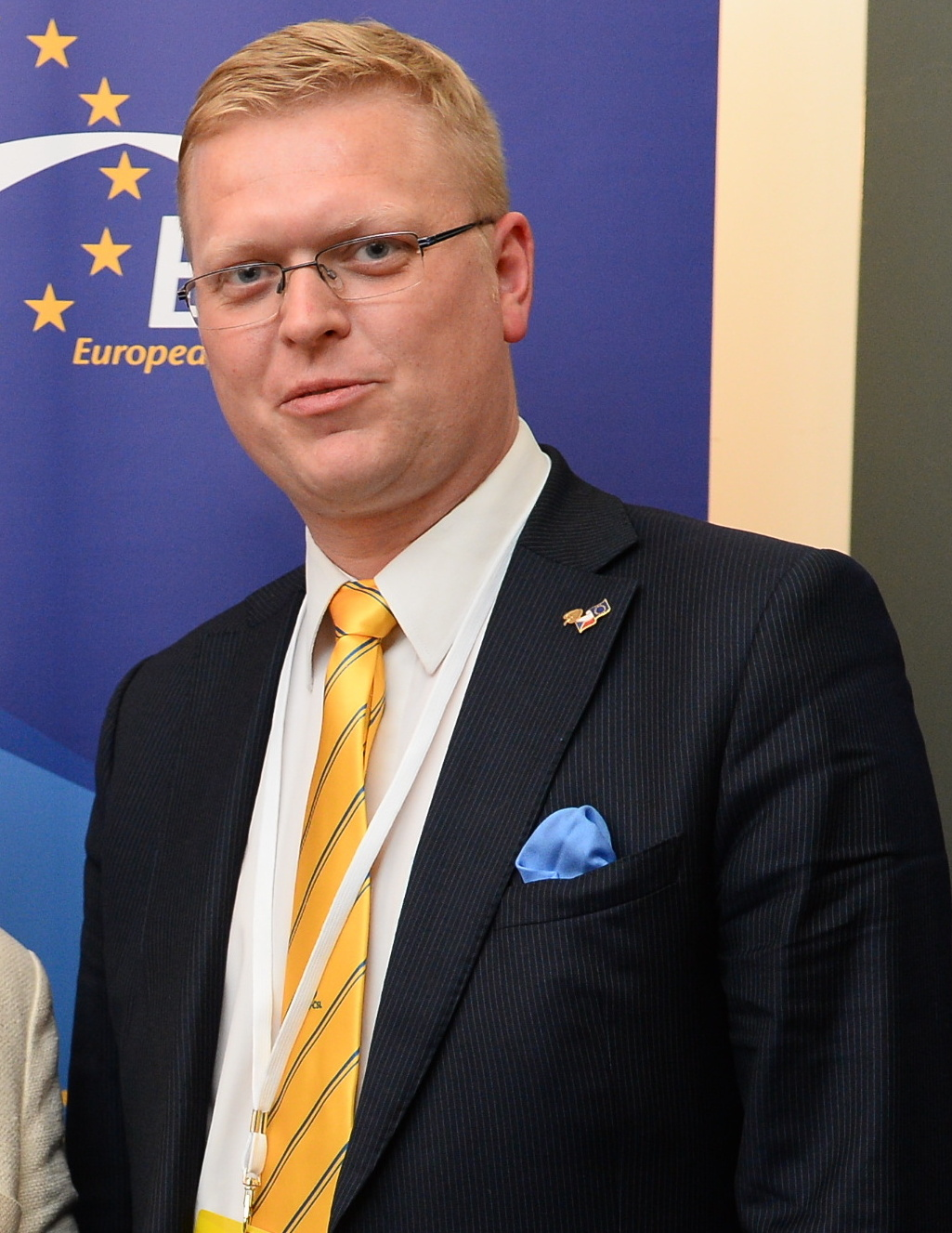
	First party	Second party	Third party
Leader	Andrej Babiš	Bohuslav Sobotka	Petr Fiala
Party	ANO	ČSSD	ODS
Seats won	1,600	3,773	2,214
Popular vote	14,458,998	12,535,655	8,930,650
Percentage	14.6%	12.7%	9.0%
	Fourth party	Fifth party	Sixth party
Leader	Karel Schwarzenberg	Vojtěch Filip	Pavel Bělobrádek
Party	TOP 09	KSČM	KDU-ČSL
Seats won	726	2,510	3,792
Popular vote	8,324,195	7,730,503	4,865,956
Percentage	8.4%	7.8%	4.9%

Municipal elections were held in the Czech Republic on 10–11 October 2014. Approximately 62,300 local council seats were elected. The date of the elections was announced by the President Miloš Zeman in June 2014.

== Results ==
Party	Seats
Christian and Democratic Union – Czechoslovak People's Party	3,792
Czech Social Democratic Party	3,773
Communist Party of Bohemia and Moravia	2,510
Civic Democratic Party	2,214
Association STAN and Independent candidates	1,749
ANO 2011	1,600
STAN	1,324
TOP 09	726
Associations of Independent candidates/local associations	30,030
Other parties and subjects (256)	7,060
Independents	6,333
Source: Novinky
