= Vít Bárta =

Czech businessman and politician (born 1973)

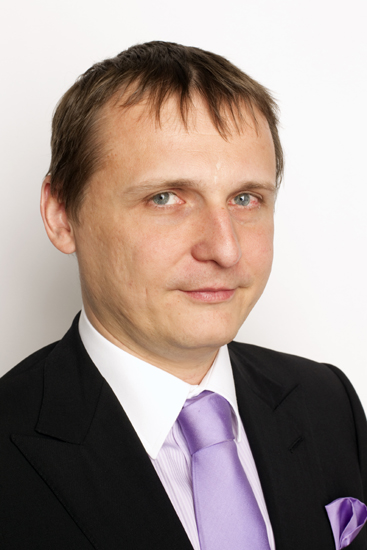

Minister of Transport
- In office 13 July 2010 – 21 April 2011
- Prime Minister: Petr Nečas
- Preceded by: Gustáv Slamečka
- Succeeded by: Radek Šmerda

Leader of Public Affairs
- In office 16 February 2013 – 25 November 2013
- Preceded by: Radek John
- Succeeded by: Jiří Kohout

Member of the Chamber of Deputies
- In office 29 May 2010 – 28 August 2013

Personal details
- Born: 5 December 1973 (age 52) Prague, Czechoslovakia (now Czech Republic)
- Spouse(s): Kateřina Klasnová (2010–present)
- Occupation: Businessman Politician

Vít Bárta (born 5 December 1973) is a Czech businessman and politician who served as Minister of Transport from 2010 to 2011 and as Member of the Chamber of Deputies (MP) from 2010 to 2013. In 2011 Bárta announced his resignation from the government due to prosecution when he was accused of bribery by his party colleagues. After his conviction and subsequent acquittal, Bárta became chairman of the Public Affairs political party and held the position in 2013.

== Political career ==
He was elected to the Chamber of Deputies of the Parliament of the Czech Republic and became a member of Petr Nečas' cabinet. He became chairman of Public Affairs on 16 February 2013, a position he held until delivering his resignation on 26 November of the same year.

== Controversy ==
In April 2011, Bárta was accused of bribery by his colleagues from Public Affairs, deputies Jaroslav Škárka, Stanislav Huml, and Kristýna Kočí. The deputies were subsequently expelled from the party. The incident caused serious problems in the Czech government coalition.

On 8 April 2011, Bárta announced his resignation from the government of Petr Nečas.

A year later, in April 2012, Bárta was convicted of bribery and conditionally sentenced to 18 months of imprisonment. In January 2013, Bárta was acquitted by the Prague 5 district court, a decision which was confirmed by Prague's city court two months later.

An additional charge was announced in 2013 against Bárta and Jan Petržílek related to wiretapping. After a prosecution lasting for more than eight years, both defendants were acquitted in May 2022. He was subsequently awarded compensation totalling around 950,000 Czech koruna.

== See also ==
- Politics of the Czech Republic
