= Public Affairs (political party) =

Public Affairs Věci veřejné
- Chairman: Fredegar Formen; Stanislava Moravcová; Jaroslav Škárka; Radek John; Vít Bárta; Jiří Kohout
- Founded: 22 July 2002
- Dissolved: 12 November 2015
- Headquarters: Štefánikova 23/203, Prague 5
- Newspaper: Věci veřejné
- Ideology: Conservative liberalism Direct democracy Populism
- Political position: Centre to centre-right
- Colours: Light blue

Website
- veciverejne.cz (archived)

Public Affairs (Czech: Věci veřejné, VV, nicknamed véčkaři) was a political party in the Czech Republic. Its main platform was transparency and opposition to political corruption. It had 24 seats in the 2010–2013 Chamber of Deputies. The party was led by anti-establishment investigative journalist and writer Radek John, and later by Jiří Kohout.

Besides opposing corruption, the party shares the fiscally conservative views of the other centre-right parties. It had a number of right-wing populist policies. The party lacked of a coherent ideology and gained voters across the political spectrum. The party was supportive of direct democracy – the members of the party could change the course of the party by Internet referendums – and was pro-European Union.

== Early years ==
Founded in 2001, the party focused on local politics in Prague, particularly Prague 1, for most of its existence. In June 2009, Radek John was recruited as its chairman, and it emerged in late 2009 as a contender in the 2010 election, polling above the 5% threshold to win seats, and occasionally above KDU-ČSL and the Green Party. John competed with Karel Schwarzenberg for the title of the country's most popular politician.

In the election, VV received 10.9% of the vote, easily surpassing the 5% threshold, and won 24 seats. The party entered into a governing coalition with the country's two other centre-right parties: the Civic Democratic Party (ODS) and TOP 09.

== Party breakdown ==
In April 2011, Vít Bárta, Czech Minister of Transport, was accused of bribery by his party colleagues, deputies Jaroslav Škárka, Stanislav Huml, and Kristýna Kočí, who were subsequently expelled from the party. The incident caused serious problems in the Czech government coalition.

A lawsuit involving several members and deputies of the party began to be debated in court on 5 March 2012. Vít Bárta was accused by the State Prosecution of bribery and Jaroslav Škárka of receiving a bribe.

After Nečas's government collapsed, some members of Public Affairs split to form another party, LIDEM, hoping to continue their coalition with ODS and TOP 09, with Miroslava Němcová as Prime Minister. However, President Miloš Zeman refused and instead appointed Jiří Rusnok a caretaker Prime Minister. When this cabinet failed to win a confidence vote in the Chamber, the opposition called for dissolution of the Chamber and early elections. The remaining Public Affairs deputies voted in favour, and the motion of dissolution was passed with 143 out of 200 votes.

On 3 September 2013, Bárta announced that Public Affairs would not be standing in the October 2013 legislative election, leading to a split in the party's leadership. Some party members were later elected as candidates of Dawn of Direct Democracy.

In August 2015, the party announced its dissolution, with chairman Jiří Kohout stating that the party no longer had enough money to operate.

== Election results ==
=== Chamber of Deputies ===
Year	Vote	Vote %	Seats	Place	Government?
2010	569,127	10.8	24 / 200	5th	Coalition (2010–12), Opposition (2012–13)
2013	On Dawn list	6.9	4 / 200	8th	Opposition
