= Order of the Nation (political party) =

Conservative Right Party – Order of the Nation Strana konzervativní pravice – Řád národa
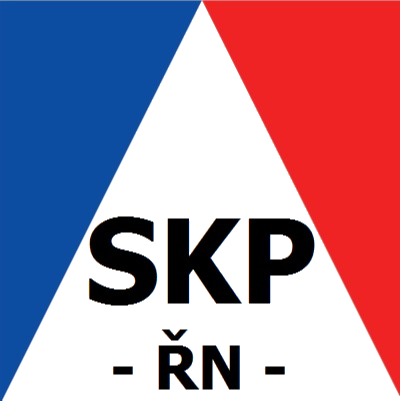
- Abbreviation: SKP - ŘN
- Founder: Karolína Peake
- Founded: 3 May 2012
- Dissolved: 15 November 2025
- Split from: Public Affairs
- Headquarters: Boženy Němcové 703, Sokolov
- Ideology: National conservatism Nationalism; Euroscepticism; Historical: Liberalism
- Political position: Far-right
- European affiliation: ELDR (formerly)
- Colours: White; Red; Blue

Conservative Right Party – Order of the Nation (Czech: Strana konzervativní pravice – Řád národa, SKP - ŘN), previously known as LIDEM – Liberal Democrats, was a political party in the Czech Republic, formed in 2012 as a breakaway party from Public Affairs (VV). The party supported greater individual freedom in both economic and social spheres. It was dissolved on 15 November 2025.

== History ==
On 22 April 2012, the governing coalition of the Civic Democratic Party (ODS) and TOP 09 dissolved their coalition with VV due to corruption accusations against the party leadership (especially Vít Bárta), raising the possibility that early elections would be held in June 2012. However, shortly afterwards VV Deputy Karolína Peake led a breakaway faction of herself and seven other VV deputies who replaced VV in the coalition with ODS and TOP 09. The revised coalition controlled 100 seats (ODS=51, TOP 09=41, LIDEM=8), and won a subsequent vote of confidence on 27 April 2012 by 105 to 93 votes, with additional support from some independent MPs. The new party was launched as LIDEM on 3 May 2012.

In September 2012, the party applied for membership of the European Liberal Democrat and Reform Party (ELDR), and was accepted on 9 November 2012.

In December 2012, the Czech Prime Minister Petr Nečas sacked Karolína Peake as Defence Minister after only eight days in the post. He stated that he had lost confidence in her after she had begun her ministerial appointment by sacking one of the most senior officials in the Defence Ministry. This situation created a coalition crisis, as Peake announced that all LIDEM ministers consequently would withdraw on 10 January 2013, unless a solution could be found. On 8 January, LIDEM's republican council guaranteed no ministers would withdraw and the party would still support the government, as long as they could renegotiate a new improved coalition agreement with TOP 09 and ODS.

On 7 August 2013, party leader Peake left the Chamber of Deputies building during a vote of confidence for the Jiří Rusnok government. The remainder of the LIDEM deputies remained in the building and voted against government. The next day, 8 August 2013, Karolína Peake announced her resignation as LIDEM leader.

LIDEM was renamed to VIZE 2014 in March 2014. The party changed its name once again in June 2015 to Order of the Nation. In May 2019, it was renamed to Conservative Right Party – Order of the Nation.

== Elected representatives ==
As per May 2012, the LIDEM parliamentary group included eight members of the 200-member Chamber of Deputies. Of these eight members, Martin Vacek and Radim Vysloužil were never members of the LIDEM party itself, but independents working with the party to form a stronger coalition group. The six MPs who were both members of the LIDEM parliamentary group and LIDEM party included:

- Lenka Andrýsová
- Dagmar Navrátilová
- Viktor Paggio
- Karolína Peake
- Jiří Rusnok
- Jana Suchá

At the end of April 2013, Jana Suchá did not renew her membership fees for the following year, but the party announced on 4 August 2013 that despite this, she would stay in the party's parliamentary group in the Chamber of Deputies until the next election. On 4 August 2013, it was also reported that the LIDEM parliamentary group still counted all original eight members, as the three independents (non-party members) committed themselves to vote along with the LIDEM party group in the Chamber of Deputies.
