= Senate district 46 – Ústí nad Orlicí =

Electoral district in the Czech Republic

46 – Ústí nad Orlicí
- inline Senate district of the Czech Republic

- The Ústí nad Orlicí district on a map
- Senator: Petr Fiala; KDU-ČSL
- Region: Pardubice
- District: Ústí nad Orlicí; Svitavy
- Last election: 2022
- Next election: 2028

Senate district 46 – Ústí nad Orlicí is an electoral district of the Senate of the Czech Republic, located in part of the Ústí nad Orlicí District and the north-western part of the Svitavy District. Since 2022, the Senator for the district is Petr Fiala, elected as a candidate of KDU-ČSL and SproK.

== Senators ==
Year	Senator	Party
1996	Bohumil Čada	KDU-ČSL
1998	Bohumil Čada	4KOALICE
2004	Ludmila Müllerová	KDU-ČSL
2010	Petr Šilar	KDU-ČSL
2016	Petr Šilar	KDU-ČSL
2022	Petr Fiala	KDU-ČSL

== Election results ==
=== 1996 ===
1996 Czech Senate election in Ústí nad Orlicí
Candidate	Party	1st round		2nd round	
Candidate	Party	Votes	%	Votes	%
Bohumil Čada	KDU-ČSL	9 600	26,84	17 294	57,23
Vladimír Zamazal	ODS	12 716	35,56	12 925	42,97
Václav Erben	ČSSD	6 296	17,60	—	—
Jiří Karlíček	KSČM	3 819	10,68	—	—
Jiří Marek	Independent	3 333	9,32	—	—

=== 1998 ===
1998 Czech Senate election in Ústí nad Orlicí
Candidate	Party	1st round		2nd round	
Candidate	Party	Votes	%	Votes	%
Bohumil Čada	4KOALICE	17 683	45,62	13 853	69,67
Lubomír Hýbl	ODS	10 251	26,44	5 946	30,03
František Slavík	ČSSD	6 075	15,67	—	—
Jiří Karlíček	KSČM	4 756	12,27	—	—

=== 2004 ===
2004 Czech Senate election in Ústí nad Orlicí
Candidate	Party	1st round		2nd round	
Candidate	Party	Votes	%	Votes	%
Ludmila Müllerová	KDU-ČSL	7 844	26,85	9 830	50,15
Jiří Čepelka	ODS	10 702	36,63	9 771	49,84
Jaroslav Demel	ČSSD	4 295	14,70	—	—
Jaroslav Fišer	KSČM	3 823	13,08	—	—
Ervín Kukuczka	SNK	1 848	6,32	—	—
Adam Bubna-Litic	KČ	354	1,21	—	—
Pavel Valenz	NEZ	345	1,18	—	—

=== 2010 ===
2010 Czech Senate election in Ústí nad Orlicí
Candidate	Party	1st round		2nd round	
Candidate	Party	Votes	%	Votes	%
Petr Šilar	KDU-ČSL	10 311	22,52	14 622	56,13
Miloslav Soušek	ČSSD	10 213	22,30	11 427	43,86
Ludmila Müllerová	TOP 09, STAN	8 377	18,29	—	—
Richard Neugebauer	ODS	7 395	16,15	—	—
Jaromír Dušek	SPOZ	3 807	8,31	—	—
Jaroslav Bajt	KSČM	2 944	6,43	—	—
Wesselin Toppisch	Suverenity	2 735	5,97	—	—

=== 2016 ===
2016 Czech Senate election in Ústí nad Orlicí
Candidate	Party	1st round		2nd round	
Candidate	Party	Votes	%	Votes	%
Petr Šilar	KDU-ČSL	11 523	33,61	9 681	63,92
Jan Lipavský	ANO 2011	6 381	18,61	5 463	36,07
Jaroslav Zedník	TOP 09	5 947	17,35	—	—
Dalibor Zelený	ČSSD	3 956	11,54	—	—
Antonín Vyšohlíd	KSČM	2 776	8,09	—	—
Soňa Hlavová	SPO	2 606	7,60	—	—
Martin Strnad	Dawn	1 086	3,16	—	—

=== 2022 ===
2022 Czech Senate election in Ústí nad Orlicí
Candidate	Party	1st round	
Candidate	Party	Votes	%
Petr Fiala	KDU-ČSL, SproK	24 433	65,66
Stanislav Ešner	ANO 2011	12 773	34,33
