= Senate district 52 – Jihlava =

Electoral district in the Czech Republic

52 – Jihlava
- inline Senate district of the Czech Republic

- The Jihlava district on a map
- Senator: Miloš Vystrčil; ODS
- Region: Vysočina; South Bohemia
- District: Jihlava; Jindřichův Hradec
- Last election: 2022
- Next election: 2028

Senate district 52 – Jihlava is an electoral district of the Senate of the Czech Republic, located in the entirety of the Jihlava District and the eastern part of the Jindřichův Hradec District. Since 2010, the Senator for the district is Miloš Vystrčil, a member of ODS and the current President of the Senate.

== Senators ==
Year	Senator	Party
1996	Václav Jehlička	ODA
1998	Václav Jehlička	4KOALICE
2004	Václav Jehlička	KDU-ČSL
2010	Miloš Vystrčil	ODS
2016	Miloš Vystrčil	ODS
2022	Miloš Vystrčil	ODS

== Election results ==
=== 1996 ===
1996 Czech Senate election in Jihlava
Candidate	Party	1st round		2nd round	
Candidate	Party	Votes	%	Votes	%
Václav Jehlička	ODA	12 653	38,03	15 703	70,49
Josef Ježek	ODS	7 750	23,30	6 574	29,51
Ladislav Urban	ČSSD	6 317	18,99	—	—
Jiří Sedláček	KSČM	4 945	14,86	—	—
Jaroslav Řičánek	ČMUS	1 602	4,82	—	—

=== 1998 ===
1998 Czech Senate election in Jihlava
Candidate	Party	1st round		2nd round	
Candidate	Party	Votes	%	Votes	%
Václav Jehlička	4KOALICE	14 824	39,85	10 569	68,03
Ivan Činčera	ODS	7 988	21,47	4 966	31,97
Pavel Málek	ČSSD	7 575	20,36	—	—
Jiří Vlach	KSČM	6 817	18,32	—	—

=== 2004 ===
2004 Czech Senate election in Jihlava
Candidate	Party	1st round		2nd round	
Candidate	Party	Votes	%	Votes	%
Václav Jehlička	KDU-ČSL	10 286	37,96	9 741	66,34
Erich Janderka	ODS	6 446	23,79	4 942	33,65
Pavel Šlechtický	KSČM	5 365	19,80	—	—
Zdeněk Jaroš	ČSSD	2 926	10,79	—	—
Blanka Dvorníková	NEZ	1 050	3,87	—	—
Miloslava Jebavá	PB	881	3,25	—	—
Vladimír Ondráček	MODS	141	0,52	—	—

=== 2010 ===
2010 Czech Senate election in Jihlava
Candidate	Party	1st round		2nd round	
Candidate	Party	Votes	%	Votes	%
Miloš Vystrčil	ODS	14 050	33,94	13 805	59,37
Vratislav Výborný	ČSSD	7 961	19,23	9 446	40,62
Pavel Šlechtický	KSČM	6 140	14,83	—	—
Jan Kasal	KDU-ČSL	4 577	11,05	—	—
Zdeňka Drlíková	TOP 09, STAN	3 744	9,04	—	—
Vladislav Nechvátal	Svobodní	2 888	6,97	—	—
František Halásek	Suverenity	1 215	2,93	—	—
Eduard Zeman	SPOZ	816	1,97	—	—

=== 2016 ===
2016 Czech Senate election in Jihlava
Candidate	Party	1st round		2nd round	
Candidate	Party	Votes	%	Votes	%
Miloš Vystrčil	ODS, SNK ED, SsČR, STO	9 043	25,71	8 144	53,37
Michal Stehlík	KDU-ČSL	5 698	16,20	7 114	46,62
Zdeněk Faltus	ANO 2011	5 396	15,34	—	—
Helena Vrzalová	KSČM	4 581	13,02	—	—
Rudolf Chloupek	ČSSD	3 713	10,55	—	—
Milan Kolář	TOP 09, SZ	3 216	9,14	—	—
Petr Paul	SPD	2 536	7,21	—	—
Jiří Nápravník	KČ	644	1,83	—	—
Zdeněk Kučírek	M	339	0,96	—	—

=== 2022 ===
2022 Czech Senate election in Jihlava
Candidate	Party	1st round		2nd round	
Candidate	Party	Votes	%	Votes	%
Miloš Vystrčil	ODS, KDU-ČSL, TOP 09	21 681	45,62	23 273	60,03
Jana Nagyová	ANO 2011	14 523	30,56	15 495	39,96
Tomáš Nielsen	PRO 2022	5 648	11,88	—	—
Václav Lhotský	SPD	2 776	5,84	—	—
Josef Pavlík	KSČM	1 712	3,60	—	—
Luděk Růžička	DOMOV	1 177	2,47	—	—
