= Senate district 58 – Brno-City =

Electoral district in the Czech Republic

58 – Brno
- inline Senate district of the Czech Republic

- The Brno-City district on a map
- Senator: Jiří Dušek; ODS
- Region: South Moravia
- District: Brno-město
- Last election: 2022
- Next election: 2028

Senate district 58 – Brno-město is an electoral district of the Senate of the Czech Republic, located in part of the Brno-City District. Since 2016, the Senator for the district is Jiří Dušek, an independent elected for a coalition of ČSSD, ODS and Fakt Brno.

== Senators ==
Year	Senator	Nominating party
1996	Luděk Zahradníček	ODS
1998	Dagmar Lastovecká	ODS
2003	Karel Jarůšek	ODS
2004	Rostislav Slavotínek	KDU-ČSL
2010	Stanislav Juránek	KDU-ČSL
2016	Jiří Dušek	ANO 2011
2022	Jiří Dušek	ODS

== Election results ==
=== 1996 ===
1996 Czech Senate election in Brno-city
Candidate	Party	1st round		2nd round	
Candidate	Party	Votes	%	Votes	%
Luděk Zahradníček	ODS	11 000	37,98	14 669	54,45
Vilém Buriánek	ČSSD	6 097	21,05	12 273	45,55
Jan Satoria	KSČM	3 629	12,53	—	—
Jiří Pernes	ODA	3 088	10,66	—	—
Ludvík Motyčka	KDU-ČSL	3 051	10,53	—	—
Milan Černocký	MSLK_96	1 072	3,70	—	—
Bohumil Pokorný	SZ	549	1,90	—	—
Jaroslav Popelka	H. A.	476	1,64	—	—

=== 1998 ===
1998 Czech Senate election in Brno-city
Candidate	Party	1st round		2nd round	
Candidate	Party	Votes	%	Votes	%
Dagmar Lastovecká	ODS	9 562	33,40	9 797	50,68
Václav Božek	ČSSD	6 955	24,30	9 534	49,32
Luděk Zahradníček	4KOALICE	6 875	24,02	—	—
Josef Kůta	KSČM	3 540	12,37	—	—
Jiří Vachek	NEZ	1 694	5,92	—	—

=== 2003 by-election ===
2003 Czech Senate by-election in Brno-city
Candidate	Party	1st round		2nd round	
Candidate	Party	Votes	%	Votes	%
Karel Jarůšek	ODS	4 858	31,63	4 761	50,11
Rostislav Slavotínek	KDU-ČSL	2 822	18,37	4 740	49,88
Daniel Borecký	KSČM	2 267	14,76	—	—
Petr Cibulka	PB	2 043	13,30	—	—
Jiří Löw	"LIRA"	1 952	12,70	—	—
Marie Součková	ČSSD	1 155	7,52	—	—
Jiří Vachek	NEZ	261	1,69	—	—

=== 2004 ===
2004 Czech Senate election in Brno-city
Candidate	Party	1st round		2nd round	
Candidate	Party	Votes	%	Votes	%
Rostislav Slavotínek	KDU-ČSL	5 327	22,06	7 453	52,77
Karel Jarůšek	ODS	7 936	32,87	6 668	47,22
Daniel Borecký	KSČM	3 555	14,72	—	—
Jiří Čejka	ČSSD	3 397	14,07	—	—
Jiří Löw	"LIRA"	2 836	11,74	—	—
Karel Kobosil	NEZ	1 086	4,49	—	—

=== 2010 ===
2010 Czech Senate election in Brno-city
Candidate	Party	1st round		2nd round	
Candidate	Party	Votes	%	Votes	%
Stanislav Juránek	KDU-ČSL	9 061	24,82	13 749	53,93
Václav Božek	ČSSD	9 774	26,78	11 744	46,06
Jiří Vorlíček	TOP 09	6 457	17,69	—	—
Miroslav Hošek	ODS	6 151	16,85	—	—
Daniel Borecký	KSČM	2 891	7,92	—	—
Jiří Vítek	VV	1 086	2,97	—	—
Jan Kux	Suverenity	568	1,55	—	—
Ladislav Zapletal	SPOZ	507	1,38	—	—

=== 2016 ===
2016 Czech Senate election in Brno-city
Candidate	Party	1st round		2nd round	
Candidate	Party	Votes	%	Votes	%
Jiří Dušek	ANO 2011	9 248	28,16	6 397	51,94
Stanislav Juránek	KDU-ČSL	7 220	21,99	5 917	48,05
Jiří Čejka	ČSSD	4 640	14,13	—	—
Barbora Antonová	SZ, TOP 09, ŽTB	4 210	12,82	—	—
Jiří Pernes	ODS, Moravané	3 162	9,63	—	—
Oldřich Duchoň	KSČM	2 483	7,56	—	—
Luděk Moudrý	Dawn	940	2,86	—	—
Lucie Zajícová	ND	492	1,49	—	—
Lubomír Žalud	KČ	438	1,33	—	—

=== 2022 ===
2022 Czech Senate election in Brno-city
Candidate	Party	1st round		2nd round	
Candidate	Party	Votes	%	Votes	%
Jiří Dušek	ČSSD, ODS, Vas, Fakt Brno	10 383	29,27	10 544	62,91
Petr Vokřál	ANO 2011	9 434	26,59	6 214	37,08
Michal Sedláček	TOP 09, KDU-ČSL	6 442	18,16	—	—
Zdeněk Koudelka	Tricolour, Moravané, SPD,	5 082	14,32	—	—
Petr Kunc	SEN 21	3 493	9,84	—	—
Lucie Zajícová	HOME	634	1,78	—	—
