= Senate district 31 – Ústí nad Labem =

Electoral district in the Czech Republic

31 – Ústí nad Labem
- inline Senate district of the Czech Republic

- The Ústí nad Labem district on a map
- Senator: Martin Krsek; SEN 21
- Region: Ústí nad Labem
- District: Ústí nad Labem; Litoměřice
- Electorate: 94,739
- Area: 404.44 km²
- Last election: 2022
- Next election: 2028

Senate district 31 – Ústí nad Labem is an electoral district of the Senate of the Czech Republic, located in the entirety of Ústí nad Labem and parts of Litoměřice districts. Since 2022, a SEN 21 nominee Martin Krsek is Senator for the district.

== Senators ==
Year	Senator	Party
1996 (Note: Election for shortened two-year term)	Oto Neubauer	ČSSD
1998	Jaroslav Doubrava	KSČM
2004	Pavel Sušický	ODS
2010	Jaroslav Doubrava	S.cz
2016	Jaroslav Doubrava	S.cz
2022	Martin Krsek	SEN 21

== Election results ==
=== 1996 ===
1996 Czech Senate election in Ústí nad Labem
Candidate	Party	1st round		2nd round	
Candidate	Party	Votes	%	Votes	%
Oto Neubauer	ČSSD	6 986	27,39	16 306	59,88
Petr Cerman	ODS	7 628	29,90	10 925	40,12
Jan Michalec	KSČM	4 535	17,78	—	—
Petr Novotný	ODA	3 726	14,61	—	—
Dušan Oslej	SZ	2 136	8,37	—	—
Jiří Šetina	DEU	497	1,95	—	—

=== 1998 ===
1998 Czech Senate election in Ústí nad Labem
Candidate	Party	1st round		2nd round	
Candidate	Party	Votes	%	Votes	%
Jaroslav Doubrava	KSČM	7 242	27,63	12 066	52,37
Zdeněk Kavina	ODS	7 428	28,34	10 976	47,63
Jan Schmidt	ČSSD	6 132	23,40	—	—
Vlastimil Novobilský	4KOALICE	4 513	17,22	—	—
Petr Miller	NEZ	895	3,41	—	—

=== 2004 ===
2004 Czech Senate election in Ústí nad Labem
Candidate	Party	1st round		2nd round	
Candidate	Party	Votes	%	Votes	%
Pavel Sušický	ODS	9 773	39,33	11 908	56,26
Jaroslav Doubrava	KSČM	7 996	32,18	9 255	43,73
Jaroslav Brychta	ČSSD	2 141	8,61	—	—
Zdeněk Kubec	SZSP	1 491	6,00	—	—
Zdeňka Jeřábková	NEZ	1 295	5,21	—	—
Roman Hanusch	SNK	1 128	4,54	—	—
Marian Páleník	CZ	1 128	2,31	—	—
Petr Hannig	SZR	444	1,78	—	—

=== 2010 ===
2010 Czech Senate election in Ústí nad Labem
Candidate	Party	1st round		2nd round	
Candidate	Party	Votes	%	Votes	%
Jaroslav Doubrava	S.cz	7 391	23,15	11 602	55,97
Pavel Sušický	ODS	8 625	27,01	9 125	44,02
Gustav Krov	ČSSD	6 656	20,85	—	—
Jan Eichler	SZSP	3 728	11,67	—	—
Petr Brázda	KSČM	2 700	8,45	—	—
Liběna Dobrovolná	TOP 09	2 500	7,83	—	—
Jan Jaroš	KDU-ČSL	321	1,00	—	—

=== 2016 ===
2016 Czech Senate election in Ústí nad Labem
Candidate	Party	1st round		2nd round	
Candidate	Party	Votes	%	Votes	%
Jaroslav Doubrava	S.cz	6 767	23,94	6 533	57,89
František Holešovský	ANO 2011	4 333	15,33	4 751	42,10
Martin Hausenblas	JsmePRO!, SZ, Pirates	3 432	12,14	—	—
Vítězslav Štefl	ČSSD	2 482	8,78	—	—
Jan Tvrdík	ODS	2 207	7,80	—	—
Tomáš Vandas	DSSS, NF, NÁR.SOC., ČÚNL	1 964	6,94	—	—
Jiří Madar	UFO	1 961	6,93	—	—
Stanislav Körner	KSČM	1 914	6,77	—	—
Ilona Tajchnerová	TOP 09	1 675	5,92	—	—
Petr Kůstka	Independent	1 524	5,39	—	—

=== 2022 ===
2022 Czech Senate election in Ústí nad Labem
Candidate	Party	1st round		2nd round	
Candidate	Party	Votes	%	Votes	%
Martin Krsek	SEN 21	6 407	19,16	11 840	67,71
Petr Nedvědický	ANO 2011	8 156	24,39	5 645	32,28
Martin Balej	ODS	4 298	12,85	—	—
Alfréd Dytrt	TOP 09, KDU-ČSL	4 078	12,19	—	—
René Hladík	SPD	3 504	10,48	—	—
Věra Nechybová	UFO	3 084	9,22	—	—
Jaroslav Telecký	PRO 2022	2 439	7,29	—	—
Miloslav Buldra	KSČM	1 032	3,08	—	—
Jan Beer	Rozumní	434	1,29	—	—
