= Senate district 79 – Hodonín =

Electoral district in the Czech Republic

79 – Hodonín
- inline Senate district of the Czech Republic

- The Hodonín district on a map
- Senator: Eva Rajchmanová; KDU-ČSL
- Region: South Moravian
- District: Hodonín
- Last election: 2022
- Next election: 2028

Senate district 79 – Hodonín is an electoral district of the Senate of the Czech Republic, located in the western part of the Hodonín District. Since 2022, the Senator for the district has been Eva Rajchmanová, elected as a KDU-ČSL candidate.

== Senators ==
Year	Senator	Party
1996	Jan Benda	KDU-ČSL
1998	Josef Kaňa	KDU-ČSL
2004	Alena Venhodová	ODS
2010	Zdeněk Škromach	ČSSD
2016	Anna Hubáčková	KDU-ČSL
2022	Eva Rajchmanová	KDU-ČSL

== Election results ==
=== 1996 ===
1996 Czech Senate election in Hodonín
Candidate	Party	1st round		2nd round	
Candidate	Party	Votes	%	Votes	%
Jan Benda	KDU-ČSL	7 550	21,23	13 060	54,04
Pavel Hofírek	ODS	10 641	29,93	11 109	45,96
Zdeněk Tomešek	ČSSD	6 204	17,45	—	—
Jan Letocha	Independent	5 275	14,84	—	—
Miloslav Hálek	KSČM	5 033	14,15	—	—
František Karkoška	MSLK 96	434	1,22	—	—
Jan Hešlar	Greens	420	1,18	—	—

=== 1998 ===
1998 Czech Senate election in Hodonín
Candidate	Party	1st round		2nd round	
Candidate	Party	Votes	%	Votes	%
Josef Kaňa	4KOALICE	13 084	34,32	9 071	56,63
Zdeněk Lukeš	ČSSD	10 130	26,57	6 946	43,37
Miroslav Novotný	ODS	7 928	20,80	—	—
Antonín Zralý	KSČM	6 979	18,31	—	—

=== 2004 ===
2004 Czech Senate election in Hodonín
Candidate	Party	1st round		2nd round	
Candidate	Party	Votes	%	Votes	%
Alena Venhodová	ODS	6 154	23,90	8 757	57,72
Josef Kaňa	KDU-ČSL	5 216	20,26	6 413	42,27
Antonín Zralý	KSČM	4 433	17,22	—	—
František Tříska	SvOS	2 682	10,41	—	—
Josef Černý	ČSSD	2 201	8,55	—	—
Jiří Kubrický	NPM	2 101	8,16	—	—
Přemysl Růžička	Independent	2 069	8,03	—	—
Petr Kozánek	NEZ	884	3,43	—	—

=== 2010 ===
2010 Czech Senate election in Hodonín
Candidate	Party	1st round		2nd round	
Candidate	Party	Votes	%	Votes	%
Zdeněk Škromach	ČSSD	17 476	37,28	16 444	56,17
Alena Venhodová	ODS	10 380	22,14	12 830	43,82
Jiří Koliba	KDU-ČSL	7 166	15,28	—	—
Martina Milerová	KSČM	4 863	10,37	—	—
Risto Ljasovský	STAN, TOP 09	3 366	7,18	—	—
Zuzana Matušková	Rozumní	1 524	3,25	—	—
Jiří Brüch	VV	1 339	2,85	—	—
Rudolf Bauer	SPOZ	760	1,62	—	—

=== 2016 ===
2016 Czech Senate election in Hodonín
Candidate	Party	1st round		2nd round	
Candidate	Party	Votes	%	Votes	%
Anna Hubáčková	KDU-ČSL	9 203	28,30	14 493	67,78
Zdeněk Škromach	ČSSD	7 892	24,26	6 888	32,21
Josef Zimovčák	ANO	5 779	17,77	—	—
Jana Bačíková	ODS	3 959	12,17	—	—
Ján Lahvička	KSČM	2 758	8,48	—	—
Vítězslav Krabička	Moravané	2 361	7,26	—	—
Květoslav Přibil	SPRRSČ	567	1,74	—	—

=== 2022 ===
2022 Czech Senate election in Hodonín
Candidate	Party	1st round		2nd round	
Candidate	Party	Votes	%	Votes	%
Eva Rajchmanová	KDU-ČSL, ODS, TOP 09	12 545	28,46	11 647	51,61
Ladislava Brančíková	ANO	12 211	27,70	10 919	48,38
Antonín Kuchař	STAN	6 464	14,66	—	—
Vítězslav Krabička	SPD	5 245	11,90	—	—
Zbyněk Pastyřík	MZH, Moravané	3 631	8,23	—	—
Lenka Ingrová	KSČM	2 461	5,58	—	—
Ivo Vašíček	Pirates	1 515	3,43	—	—
