= Senate district 67 – Nový Jičín =

Electoral district in the Czech Republic

67 – Nový Jičín
- inline Senate district of the Czech Republic

- The Nový Jičín district on a map
- Senator: Ivana Váňová; KDU-ČSL
- Region: Moravian-Silesian
- District: Nový Jičín; Ostrava-City
- Last election: 2022
- Next election: 2028

Senate district 67 – Nový Jičín is an electoral district of the Senate of the Czech Republic, consisting of the eastern part of the Nový Jičín District and part of the Ostrava-City District. Since 2022, the Senator for the district has been Ivana Váňová, a member of KDU-ČSL.

== Senators ==
Year	Senator	Party
1996	František Konečný	ODS
1998	Jaroslav Šula	4KOALICE
2004	Milan Bureš	ODS
2010	Zdeněk Besta	ČSSD
2016	Petr Orel	SZ
2022	Ivana Váňová	KDU-ČSL

== Election results ==
=== 1996 ===
1996 Czech Senate election in Nový Jičín
Candidate	Party	1st round		2nd round	
Candidate	Party	Votes	%	Votes	%
František Konečný	ODS	12 024	34.12	16 749	50.15
Astrid Poučová	ČSSD	8 626	24.48	16 646	49.85
Josef Pavela	KDU-ČSL	6 761	19.19	—	—
Ludmila Hanzelková	KSČM	5 687	16.14	—	—
Vladimír Klečka	SZ	1 477	4.19	—	—
Antonín Hrňa	MSLK_96	665	1.89	—	—

=== 1998 ===
1998 Czech Senate election in Nový Jičín
Candidate	Party	1st round		2nd round	
Candidate	Party	Votes	%	Votes	%
Jaroslav Šula	4KOALICE	8 524	22.67	9 733	55.52
Milan Šturm	ODS	9 360	24.90	7 798	44.48
Ludmila Hanzelková	KSČM	7 074	18.82	—	—
Jiří Dener	ČSSD	5 880	15.64	—	—
Jaroslav Petržela	Independent	5 027	13.37	—	—
Aloiz Kreisel	Independent	1 731	4.60	—	—

=== 2004 ===
2004 Czech Senate election in Nový Jičín
Candidate	Party	1st round		2nd round	
Candidate	Party	Votes	%	Votes	%
Milan Bureš	ODS	6 997	23.59	9 152	52.24
Jaroslav Šula	KDU-ČSL	5 422	18.28	8 265	47.45
Jiří Schwarz	Independent	5 022	16.93	—	—
Karel Vymětal	KSČM	4 447	14.99	—	—
Sylva Kováčiková	SNK	3 297	11.11	—	—
František Kačenka	ČSSD	2 006	6.76	—	—
Roman Jelínek	SP	1 386	4.67	—	—
Bohuslav Chwajol	NEZ	1 080	3.64	—	—

=== 2010 ===
2010 Czech Senate election in Nový Jičín
Candidate	Party	1st round		2nd round	
Candidate	Party	Votes	%	Votes	%
Zdeněk Besta	ČSSD	10 280	22.21	15 786	60.32
Milan Bureš	ODS	7 657	16.54	10 382	39.67
Drahomír Strnadel	NBeskydy	5 694	12.30	—	—
Karel Kuboš	KSČM	5 384	11.63	—	—
Sylva Kováčiková	VV	5 322	11.50	—	—
Jaroslav Šula	KDU-ČSL	4 962	10.72	—	—
Miroslav Kobsa	TOP 09	4 702	10.16	—	—
Zdeněk Krajčíř	SPOZ	1 312	2.83	—	—
Antonín Hrabánek	Suverenity	962	2.07	—	—

=== 2016 ===
2016 Czech Senate election in Nový Jičín
Candidate	Party	1st round		2nd round	
Candidate	Party	Votes	%	Votes	%
Petr Orel	SZ, KDU-ČSL	11 162	33.73	12 565	74.23
Jaroslav Dvořák	ČSSD	6 295	19.02	4 361	25.76
Jiří Strýček	ANO 2011	6 255	18.90	—	—
Pavel Pisch	KSČM	4 516	13.64	—	—
Jiří Demel	Pirates	2 493	7.53	—	—
Pavel Jurečka	Dawn	2 368	7.15	—	—

=== 2022 ===
2022 Czech Senate election in Nový Jičín
Candidate	Party	1st round		2nd round	
Candidate	Party	Votes	%	Votes	%
Ivana Váňová	KDU-ČSL, ODS, TOP 09	9 598	21.31	10 039	50.79
Jaromír Radkovský	ANO 2011	12 865	28.56	9 726	49.20
Petr Orel	Greens	8 828	19.60	—	—
Pavel Liška	SPD	5 436	12.06	—	—
Leo Luzar	Independent	3 289	7.30	—	—
Dana Váhalová	ČSSD	2 567	5.69	—	—
Jan Mužík	Tricolour	2 455	5.45	—	—
