= Senate district 64 – Bruntál =

Electoral district in the Czech Republic

64 – Bruntál
- inline Senate district of the Czech Republic

- The Bruntál district on a map
- Senator: Ladislav Václavec; ANO 2011
- Region: Moravian-Silesian
- District: Bruntál; Opava
- Last election: 2022
- Next election: 2028

Senate district 64 – Bruntál is an electoral district of the Senate of the Czech Republic, located in the entirety of the Bruntál District and parts of the Opava District. Since 2016, the Senator for the district has been Ladislav Václavec, an independent elected for ANO 2011.

== Senators ==
Year	Senator	Party
1996	Zdeněk Babka	ČSSD
1998	Rostislav Harazin	KSČM
2004	Jiří Žák	ODS
2010	Jaroslav Palas	ČSSD
2016	Ladislav Václavec	ANO 2011
2022	Ladislav Václavec	ANO 2011

== Election results ==
=== 1996 ===
1996 Czech Senate election in Bruntál
Candidate	Party	1st round		2nd round	
Candidate	Party	Votes	%	Votes	%
Zdeněk Babka	ČSSD	6 335	26.83	14 755	62.93
Karel Janyška	ODS	6 632	28.09	8 691	37.07
Rostislav Harazin	KSČM	5 294	22.42	—	—
Vladimír Vocelka	ODA	4 123	17.46	—	—
Miroslav Štěpán	KSČ	627	2.66	—	—
Eduard Peřich	SPŽRČR	597	2.53	—	—

=== 1998 ===
1998 Czech Senate election in Bruntál
Candidate	Party	1st round		2nd round	
Candidate	Party	Votes	%	Votes	%
Rostislav Harazin	KSČM	7 852	26.92	10 154	60.48
Jana Škrlová	ODS	5 282	18.11	6 635	39.52
Jaromír Foltýn	Independent	5 032	17.25	—	—
Zdeněk Babka	ČSSD	4 533	15.54	—	—
Luděk Jurajda	4KOALICE	3 976	13.63	—	—
Milan Glombíček	Independent	1 778	6.10	—	—
Miroslav Štěpán	KSČ	716	2.45	—	—

=== 2004 ===
2004 Czech Senate election in Bruntál
Candidate	Party	1st round		2nd round	
Candidate	Party	Votes	%	Votes	%
Jiří Žák	ODS	4 563	23.90	8 533	53.37
Rostislav Harazin	KSČM	5 421	28.40	7 453	46.62
Ludmila Čajanová	KDU-ČSL	2 371	12.42	—	—
Josef Hercig	ČSSD	2 307	12.08	—	—
Jarmila Handlová	Independent	1 318	6.90	—	—
Stanislav Navrátil	US-DEU	779	4.08	—	—
Jan Ziegler	NEZ	759	3.97	—	—
Josef Švéda	Independent	742	3.88	—	—
Jiří Škrabal	SNK	513	2.68	—	—
Václav Blažek	SP	312	1.63	—	—

=== 2010 ===
2010 Czech Senate election in Bruntál
Candidate	Party	1st round		2nd round	
Candidate	Party	Votes	%	Votes	%
Jaroslav Palas	ČSSD	11 062	32.69	12 013	62.56
Jiří Žák	ODS	4 775	14.11	7 189	37.43
Vítězslav Maláč	KDU-ČSL	4 543	13.42	—	—
Miroslava Hustáková	Independent	3 962	11.70	—	—
Pavel Bačgoň	KSČM	3 947	11.66	—	—
Jan Síla	Independent	1 681	4.96	—	—
Marián Olejník	TOP 09	1 484	4.38	—	—
Vilém Urbiš	VV	1 399	4.13	—	—
Alfréd Roik	SZR	984	2.90	—	—

=== 2016 ===
2016 Czech Senate election in Bruntál
Candidate	Party	1st round		2nd round	
Candidate	Party	Votes	%	Votes	%
Ladislav Václavec	ANO 2011	5 883	24.88	6 575	53.40
Ladislav Sekanina	KSČM	4 394	18.59	5 737	46.59
Vítězslav Maláč	KDU-ČSL	3 087	13.06	—	—
Ladislav Velebný	ČSSD	2 881	12.18	—	—
Salome Sýkorová	SNK ED, SZ	1 882	7.96	—	—
Bronislav Sedláček	STAN	1 830	7.74	—	—
Jiří Žák	ODS, SsČR	1 645	6.95	—	—
Miroslav Sládek	SPR-RSČ	773	3.27	—	—
Rudolf Skandera	Dawn	655	2.77	—	—
Jaroslav Chalupa	DSSS	340	1.43	—	—
Radoslav Štědroň	SSPD-SP	266	1.12	—	—

=== 2022 ===
2022 Czech Senate election in Bruntál
Candidate	Party	Votes	%
Ladislav Václavec	ANO 2011	19 804	58.85
Pavla Löwenthalová	KDU-ČSL, ODS, TOP 09	4 367	12.97
Miroslava Hustáková	Tricolour	3 057	9.08
Luděk Šarman	NEZ	2 510	7.46
Ladislav Šupina	KSČM	2 437	7.24
Antonín Staněk	Přísaha	1 471	4.37
