= Senate district 19 – Prague 11 =

Electoral district in the Czech Republic

Coordinates: 50°01′58″N 14°34′10″E

19 – Prague 11
- inline Senate district of the Czech Republic

- The Prague-11 district on a map
- Senator: Hana Marvanová; Civic Democratic Party
- Region: Capital City of Prague
- District: Prague
- Electorate: 93534
- Area: 62.03 km²
- Last election: 2022
- Next election: 2028

Senate district 19 – Prague 11 is an electoral district of the Senate of the Czech Republic, located in the Capital City of Prague. Since 2022, a Civic Democratic Party nominee Hana Marvanová is Senator for the district.

== Senators ==
Year	Senator	Party
1996 (Note: Election for shortened two-year term)	Václav Mencl	ODS
1998	Daniel Kroupa	4KOALICE
2004	Jan Nádvorník	ODS
2010	Milan Pešák	ODS
2016	Ladislav Kos	HPP 11
2022	Hana Marvanová	ODS

== Election results ==
=== 1996 ===
1996 Czech Senate election in Prague 11
Candidate	Party	1st round		2nd round	
Candidate	Party	Votes	%	Votes	%
Václav Mencl	ODS	18 915	47,81	23 847	63,70
Ivan David	ČSSD	8 011	20,25	13 590	36,30
Oldřich Kužílek	ODA	7 356	18,59	—	—
Jaroslav Matějka	KSČM	4 090	10,34	—	—
Dominik Chren	NEZ	1 188	3,00	—	—

=== 1998 ===
1998 Czech Senate election in Prague 11
Candidate	Party	1st round		2nd round	
Candidate	Party	Votes	%	Votes	%
Daniel Kroupa	4KOALICE	10 399	28,66	14 150	57,78
Václav Mencl	ODS	12 343	34,01	10 338	42,22
Zdeněk Šarapatka	ČSSD	6 180	17,03	—	—
Jaroslav Matějka	KSČM	3 844	10,59	—	—
Karel Hurt	SZ	3 523	9,71	—	—

=== 2004 ===
2004 Czech Senate election in Prague 11
Candidate	Party	1st round		2nd round	
Candidate	Party	Votes	%	Votes	%
Jan Nádvorník	ODS	10 201	39,65	10 407	55,04
Petr Jirava	SNK ED	3 689	14,33	8 500	44,95
Antonín Zápotocký	KDU-ČSL	3 364	13,07	—	—
Jaroslava Dlouhá	KSČM	3 085	11,99	—	—
Daniel Kroupa	CZ	3 011	11,70	—	—
Ivan David	ČSSD	2 131	8,28	—	—
Petr Hoffmann	NEZ	245	0,95	—	—

=== 2010 ===
2010 Czech Senate election in Prague 11
Candidate	Party	1st round		2nd round	
Candidate	Party	Votes	%	Votes	%
Milan Pešák	ODS	10 671	26,20	15 017	56,70
Ladislav Kárský	ČSSD	8 304	20,39	11 464	43,29
Josef Zieleniec	VV	7 516	18,45	—	—
Pavel Hlaváč	TOP 09	5 130	12,59	—	—
Jana Čunátová	KSČM	2 963	7,27	—	—
Miloslav Bednář	Svobodní	2 154	5,28	—	—
Ladislav Bátora	Suverenity	1 396	3,42	—	—
Pavel Přeučil	ČPS	1 131	2,77	—	—
Augustin Bubník	SNK ED	964	2,36	—	—
Peter Ondrejka	ČSNS 2005	496	1,21	—	—

=== 2016 ===
2016 Czech Senate election in Prague 11
Candidate	Party	1st round		2nd round	
Candidate	Party	Votes	%	Votes	%
Ladislav Kos	HPP 11, KDU-ČSL, Pirates, SZ	4 702	16,67	9 639	55,89
Helena Válková	ANO 2011	5 423	19,23	7 607	44,10
Miroslava Skovajsová	ČSSD	4 349	15,42	—	—
Jakub Lepš	TOP 09, STAN	3 972	14,09	—	—
Marta Šorfová	ODS	3 137	11,12	—	—
Petr Sýkora	JM-ND	1 560	5,53	—	—
Věra Příhodová	SPD	1 191	4,22	—	—
Jana Čunátová	KSČM	944	3,34	—	—
Jan Koukal	SsČR	815	2,89	—	—
Vlastimil Vilímec	HPP	673	2,38	—	—
Petr Hannig	Rozumní	662	2,34	—	—
Věra Hollerová	KSČ	554	1,96	—	—
Martin Vacek	HOZK	208	0,73	—	—

=== 2022 ===
2022 Czech Senate election in Prague 11
Candidate	Party	1st round		2nd round	
Candidate	Party	Votes	%	Votes	%
Hana Kordová Marvanová	ODS, KDU-ČSL, TOP 09	15 080	39,02	11 764	67,87
Ladislav Kos	HPP 11, Greens, SEN 21	6 524	16,88	5 569	32,12
Tomáš Hudeček	Independent	5 653	14,63	—	—
Milan Urban	SPD	5 157	13,34	—	—
Vladimír Špidla	ČSSD	3 221	8,33	—	—
David Bohbot	Svobodní	1 373	3,55	—	—
Robert Vašíček	ČSNS	968	2,50	—	—
Šárka Oharková	PES	663	1,71	—	—
