= Senate district 61 – Olomouc =

Electoral district in the Czech Republic

61 – Olomouc
- inline Senate district of the Czech Republic

- The Olomouc district on a map
- Senator: Lumír Kantor; KDU-ČSL
- Region: Olomouc
- District: Olomouc
- Last election: 2022
- Next election: 2028

Senate district 61 – Olomouc is an electoral district of the Senate of the Czech Republic, located in the eastern part of the Olomouc District. Since 2016, the Senator for the district is Lumír Kantor, an independent elected for KDU-ČSL.

== Senators ==
Year	Senator	Party
1996	Josef Jařab	ODA
1998	František Mezihorák	ČSSD
2004	Jan Hálek	ODS
2010	Martin Tesařík	ČSSD
2016	Lumír Kantor	KDU-ČSL
2022	Lumír Kantor	KDU-ČSL

== Election results ==
=== 1996 ===
1996 Czech Senate election in Olomouc
Candidate	Party	1st round		2nd round	
Candidate	Party	Votes	%	Votes	%
Josef Jařab	ODA	9 372	25,21	16 080	55,02
Jan Hálek	ODS	13 395	36,02	13 146	44,98
František Mezihorák	ČSSD	8 626	23,20	—	—
Miroslav Marek	KSČM	4 538	12,20	—	—
Jaroslav Křivánek	ČSNS	863	2,32	—	—
František Stružka	MSLK_96	389	1,05	—	—

=== 1998 ===
1998 Czech Senate election in Olomouc
Candidate	Party	1st round		2nd round	
Candidate	Party	Votes	%	Votes	%
František Mezihorák	ČSSD	10 033	29,31	11 258	51,73
Jan Hálek	ODS	10 028	29,30	10 506	48,27
Tomáš Kvapil	4KOALICE	9 056	26,46	—	—
Miroslav Marek	KSČM	5 109	14,93	—	—

=== 2004 ===
2004 Czech Senate election in Olomouc
Candidate	Party	1st round		2nd round	
Candidate	Party	Votes	%	Votes	%
Jan Hálek	ODS	9 152	29,87	12 238	55,74
Martin Tesařík	ČSSD	6 684	21,82	9 716	44,25
Jana Mačáková	ED	5 963	19,46	—	—
Jaroslava Cardová	KSČM	4 775	15,58	—	—
Marie Horáková	KDU-ČSL	3 025	9,87	—	—
Pavel Foretník	N	886	2,89	—	—
Stanislav Stránský	NEZ	146	0,47	—	—

=== 2010 ===
2010 Czech Senate election in Olomouc
Candidate	Party	1st round		2nd round	
Candidate	Party	Votes	%	Votes	%
Martin Tesařík	ČSSD	14 306	34,52	16 052	54,78
Jan Hálek	ODS	8 449	20,38	13 249	45,21
Jiří Klein	TOP 09, STAN	8 216	19,82	—	—
Miroslav Skácel	KSČM	4 004	9,66	—	—
Pavel Nováček	KDU-ČSL	3 745	9,03	—	—
Jan Rytíř	Suverenity	2 326	5,61	—	—
Josef Dušek	SPOZ	396	0,95	—	—

=== 2016 ===
2016 Czech Senate election in Olomouc
Candidate	Party	1st round		2nd round	
Candidate	Party	Votes	%	Votes	%
Lumír Kantor	KDU-ČSL	10 215	27,62	10 794	52,44
Milan Brázdil	ANO 2011	12 271	33,18	9 786	47,55
Martin Tesařík	ČSSD	5 185	14,02	—	—
Zdenka Szukalská	KSČM	3 007	8,13	—	—
Jaroslav Morávek	ODS	2 509	6,78	—	—
Ivo Barteček	SsČR	1 989	5,37	—	—
Eva Hrindová	APAČI 2017	906	2,45	—	—
Pavel Andrš	KČ	556	1,50	—	—
Václav Šimek	ND	338	0,91	—	—

=== 2022 ===
2022 Czech Senate election in Olomouc
Candidate	Party	1st round		2nd round	
Candidate	Party	Votes	%	Votes	%
Lumír Kantor	KDU-ČSL	11 121	26,06	14 778	60,07
Milan Brázdil	ANO 2011	13 851	32,46	9 820	39,92
Čestmír Neoral	ODS	4 871	11,41	—	—
Zuzana Majerová	Tricolour	4 238	9,93	—	—
Václav Ranc	Pirates	2 946	6,90	—	—
Michal Malacka	STAN	2 399	5,62	—	—
Petr Vrána	PRO 2022	2 290	5,36	—	—
Ctirad Musil	Moravané	954	2,23	—	—
