= Senate district 40 – Kutná Hora =

Electoral district in the Czech Republic

40 – Kutná Hora
- inline Senate district of the Czech Republic

- The Kutná Hora district on a map
- Senator: Bohuslav Procházka; KDU-ČSL
- Region: Central Bohemian; Vysočina
- District: Kutná Hora; Havlíčkův Brod; Benešov
- Electorate: 112,518
- Area: 1,809.83 km²
- Last election: 2022
- Next election: 2028

Senate district 40 – Kutná Hora is an electoral district of the Senate of the Czech Republic, located in the entirety of the Kutná Hora District and parts of the Havlíčkův Brod and Benešov districts. Since 2022, a KDU-ČSL member Bohuslav Procházka is Senator for the district.

== Senators ==
Year	Senator	Party
1996 (Note: Election for shortened two-year term)	Karen Floss	ČSSD
1998	Jan Fencl	ČSSD
2004	Bedřich Moldan	ODS
2010	Jaromír Strnad	ČSSD
2016	Jaromír Strnad	ČSSD
2022	Bohuslav Procházka	KDU-ČSL

== Election results ==
=== 1996 ===
1996 Czech Senate election in Kutná Hora
Candidate	Party	1st round		2nd round	
Candidate	Party	Votes	%	Votes	%
Karen Floss	ČSSD	8 016	26,42	15 680	53,07
Ivo Šanc	ODS	11 879	39,16	13 866	46,93
Jan Mičánek	KDU-ČSL	4 710	15,53	—	—
Radoslav Klein	KSČM	4 651	15,33	—	—
Radko Šťastný	ČSNS	1 082	3,57	—	—

=== 1998 ===
1998 Czech Senate election in Kutná Hora
Candidate	Party	1st round		2nd round	
Candidate	Party	Votes	%	Votes	%
Jan Fencl	ČSSD	9 638	28,26	9 229	55,58
Miloslav Palán	ODS	8 918	26,15	7 376	44,42
Josef Mikšovský	4KOALICE	8 398	24,62	—	—
Václav Melša	KSČM	7 153	20,97	—	—

=== 2004 ===
2004 Czech Senate election in Kutná Hora
Candidate	Party	1st round		2nd round	
Candidate	Party	Votes	%	Votes	%
Bedřich Moldan	ODS	5 522	24,13	8 066	51,22
Běla Hejná	ČSSD	4 810	21,02	7 680	48,77
Václav Melša	KSČM	4 183	18,28	—	—
Ivo Šanc	US-DEU	3 501	15,30	—	—
Josef Viktora	Independent	2 356	10,29	—	—
Petr Janda	NEZ	1 428	6,24	—	—
Vladimír Zeman	ED, SNK	1 077	4,70	—	—

=== 2010 ===
2010 Czech Senate election in Kutná Hora
Candidate	Party	1st round		2nd round	
Candidate	Party	Votes	%	Votes	%
Jaromír Strnad	ČSSD	13 125	30,59	14 500	60,16
Zdeněk Nováček	TOP 09, STAN	7 261	16,92	9 599	39,83
Lucie Talmanová	ODS	5 389	12,56	—	—
Stanislav Veselý	KSČM	4 594	10,70	—	—
Oldřich Doležal	Independent	3 118	7,26	—	—
Olga Zubová	DSZ	2 515	5,86	—	—
Michaela Šojdrová	KDU-ČSL	2 406	5,60	—	—
Ladislav Exner	VV	1 843	4,29	—	—
Jana Volfová	Suverenity	1 203	2,80	—	—
Marie Matyášová	SPOZ	810	1,88	—	—
Milan Vodička	Svobodní	405	0,94	—	—
Josef Mrocek	KČ	236	0,55	—	—

=== 2016 ===
2016 Czech Senate election in Kutná Hora
Candidate	Party	1st round		2nd round	
Candidate	Party	Votes	%	Votes	%
Jaromír Strnad	ČSSD	9 560	29,64	8 312	54,79
Ivo Šanc	STAN	8 061	25,00	6 856	45,20
Julius Špičák	ANO	5 657	17,54	—	—
Lenka Bochníčková	KSČM	4 539	14,07	—	—
Milan Vodička	Svobodní, ODS, SsČR	3 402	10,55	—	—
Radim Špaček	KČ	1 024	3,17	—	—

=== 2022 ===
2022 Czech Senate election in Kutná Hora
Candidate	Party	1st round		2nd round	
Candidate	Party	Votes	%	Votes	%
Bohuslav Procházka	KDU-ČSL	9 567	20,38	10 606	50,62
Jaromír Strnad	ČSSD, ANO	14 820	31,57	10 344	49,37
Kateřina Daczická	ODS	6 857	14,61	—	—
Luděk Jeništa	STAN	6 845	14,58	—	—
Antonín Dušek	SPD	4 165	8,87	—	—
Jiří Reichel	KSČM	2 438	5,19	—	—
Jiří Strachota	Svobodní	2 237	4,76	—	—
