= Senate district 28 – Mělník =

Electoral district in the Czech Republic

Coordinates: 50°15′44″N 14°30′02″E

28 – Mělník
- inline Senate district of the Czech Republic

- The Mělník district on a map
- Senator: Jarmila Smotlachová; ODS
- Region: Central Bohemian
- District: Mělník; Prague-East
- Electorate: 119,047
- Area: 957.73 km²
- Last election: 2022
- Next election: 2028

Senate district 28 – Mělník is an electoral district of the Senate of the Czech Republic, located in the Mělník and Prague-East districts. Since 2022, a ODS member Jarmila Smotlachová is Senator for the district.

== Senators ==
Year	Senator	Party
1996 (Note: Election for shortened two-year term)	Jaroslav Horák	ODS
1998	Jaroslav Horák	ODS
2004	Jiří Nedoma	ODS
2010	Veronika Vrecionová	ODS
2016	Petr Holeček	STAN
2022	Jarmila Smotlachová	ODS

== Election results ==
=== 1996 ===
1996 Czech Senate election in Mělník
Candidate	Party	1st round		2nd round	
Candidate	Party	Votes	%	Votes	%
Jaroslav Horák	ODS	15 436	44,83	17 748	55,55
Zdeněk Chalupník	ČSSD	6 673	19,38	14 199	44,45
Josef Materna	KSČM	5 440	15,80	—	—
Antonín Baudyš	KDU-ČSL	2 817	8,18	—	—
Eva Kudláčková	DEU	1 621	4,71	—	—
Miroslav Baloun	ČP	1 061	3,08	—	—
Daniela Králová	KAN	735	2,13	—	—
Josef Mečl	SDL	647	1,88	—	—

=== 1998 ===
1998 Czech Senate election in Mělník
Candidate	Party	1st round		2nd round	
Candidate	Party	Votes	%	Votes	%
Jaroslav Horák	ODS	11 414	31,17	10 252	53,80
Oldřich Pácha	ČSSD	7 574	20,68	8 802	46,20
Josef Materna	KSČM	7 158	19,55	—	—
Ratibor Majzlík	4KOALICE	7 038	19,22	—	—
Miroslav Baloun	ČP	3 436	9,38	—	—

=== 2004 ===
2004 Czech Senate election in Mělník
Candidate	Party	1st round		2nd round	
Candidate	Party	Votes	%	Votes	%
Jiří Nedoma	ODS	9 213	32,47	9 787	56,27
Radim Uzel	SeVo	4 299	15,15	7 604	43,72
Jiřina Fialová	KSČM	4 240	14,94	—	—
Stanislav Huml	NEZ	3 304	11,64	—	—
Zuzana Baudyšová	KDU-ČSL	3 114	10,97	—	—
Ctirad Mikeš	ČSSD	3 037	10,70	—	—
Jindra Hudcová	SNK, ED	1 166	4,10	—	—

=== 2010 ===
2010 Czech Senate election in Mělník
Candidate	Party	1st round		2nd round	
Candidate	Party	Votes	%	Votes	%
Veronika Vrecionová	ODS	14 497	30,69	16 035	55,83
Milan Němec	ČSSD	12 042	25,49	12 682	44,16
Nina Nováková	TOP 09, STAN	9 800	20,75	—	—
Jiřina Fialová	KSČM	4 985	10,55	—	—
Petr Hannig	Suverenity	3 405	7,21	—	—
Libor Holík	VV	2 495	5,28	—	—

=== 2016 ===
2016 Czech Senate election in Mělník
Candidate	Party	1st round		2nd round	
Candidate	Party	Votes	%	Votes	%
Petr Holeček	STAN	8 222	23,26	10 419	63,64
Veronika Vrecionová	ODS	7 538	21,33	5 951	36,35
Igor Karen	ANO 2011	6 290	17,80	—	—
Stanislav Huml	ČSSD	4 348	12,30	—	—
Zdeněk Štefek	KSČM	2 538	7,18	—	—
Martin Mach	SZ	2 457	6,95	—	—
Jiří Kobza	SPD	2 261	6,39	—	—
Petr Zavadil	Svobodní	1 166	3,29	—	—
Svatopluk Černý	DSSS	364	1,03	—	—
Pavel Matějka	SPR-RSČ of Miroslav Sládek	151	0,42	—	—

=== 2022 ===
2022 Czech Senate election in Mělník
Candidate	Party	1st round		2nd round	
Candidate	Party	Votes	%	Votes	%
Jarmila Smotlachová	ODS (Note: Supported by KDU-ČSL and Freeholder Party of the Czech Republic)	11 603	25,02	14 929	65,22
Andrea Brzobohatá	ANO 2011	11 163	24,07	7 961	34,77
Petr Holeček	STAN	8 893	19,17	—	—
Zdeněk Šarapatka	TOP 09	5 076	10,94	—	—
Ivan Noveský	PRO 2022	4 576	9,86	—	—
Milan Němec	ZSZME	2 768	5,96	—	—
Karen Pumrová	Manifest.cz (Note: Supported by Svobodní)	2 290	4,93	—	—
