= Senate district 73 – Frýdek-Místek =

Electoral district in the Czech Republic

73 – Frýdek-Místek
- inline Senate district of the Czech Republic

- The Frýdek-Místek district on a map
- Senator: Zdeněk Matušek; ANO 2011
- Region: Moravian-Silesian
- District: Frýdek-Místek; Karviná
- Last election: 2022
- Next election: 2028

Senate district 73 – Frýdek-Místek is an electoral district of the Senate of the Czech Republic, located in the eastern part of the Frýdek-Místek District and the southern part of the Karviná District. Since 2022, the Senator for the district has been Zdeněk Matušek, an independent elected for ANO 2011.

== Senators ==
Year	Senator	Party
1996	Emil Škrabiš	KDU-ČSL
1998	Emil Škrabiš	4KOALICE
2004	Igor Petrov	SNK
2010	Petr Gawlas	ČSSD
2016	Jiří Cieńciała	OSN
2022	Zdeněk Matušek	ANO

== Election results ==
=== 1996 ===
1996 Czech Senate election in Frýdek-Místek
Candidate	Party	1st round		2nd round	
Candidate	Party	Votes	%	Votes	%
Emil Škrabiš	KDU-ČSL	5 328	23,05	11 776	61,43
Jan Starý	ODS	7 229	31,28	7 394	38,57
Halina Dordová	KSČM	5 164	22,34	—	—
Bohumil Blahoňovský	Independent	3 597	15,56	—	—
Jiří Czap	COEX	1 794	7,66	—	—

=== 1998 ===
1998 Czech Senate election in Frýdek-Místek
Candidate	Party	1st round		2nd round	
Candidate	Party	Votes	%	Votes	%
Emil Škrabiš	4KOALICE	7 148	23,48	6 707	52,27
Miroslav Doseděl	ČSSD	6 817	22,39	6 124	47,73
Halina Dordová	KSČM	5 550	18,23	—	—
Zdeněk Budínský	ODS	5 479	18,00	—	—
Ladislav Gavlas	Independent	2 702	8,87	—	—
Jiří Pinkava	COEX	1 419	4,66	—	—
Jan Szotkowski	Independent	1 331	4,37	—	—

=== 2004 ===
2004 Czech Senate election in Frýdek-Místek
Candidate	Party	1st round		2nd round	
Candidate	Party	Votes	%	Votes	%
Igor Petrov	SNK	5 325	23,54	7 567	59,55
Emil Škrabiš	KDU-ČSL	4 216	18,64	5 138	40,44
Jan Weber	ODS	3 314	14,65	—	—
Měčislav Kaleta	KSČM	2 636	11,65	—	—
Anna Konderlová	Independent	2 604	11,59	—	—
Jan Ferenc	NEZ	2 071	9,15	—	—
Miroslav Poništ	ČSSD	1 903	8,41	—	—
Jan Szotkowski	HNPD	494	2,18	—	—
Pavol Valko	SP	53	0,23	—	—

=== 2010 ===
2010 Czech Senate election in Frýdek-Místek
Candidate	Party	1st round		2nd round	
Candidate	Party	Votes	%	Votes	%
Petr Gawlas	ČSSD	11 127	27,39	12 669	51,41
Stanislav Czudek	VV	10 382	25,55	11 973	48,58
Dagmar Adamová	ODS	5 211	12,82	—	—
Igor Petrov	TOP 09, STAN	4 411	10,85	—	—
Miroslav Boublík	KSČM	4 221	10,39	—	—
Michael Trojka	KDU-ČSL	2 196	5,40	—	—
Marian Kuś	NEZ	1 817	4,47	—	—
Jan Szotkowski	Suverenity	1 256	3,09	—	—

=== 2016 ===
2016 Czech Senate election in Frýdek-Místek
Candidate	Party	1st round		2nd round	
Candidate	Party	Votes	%	Votes	%
Jiří Cieńciała	OSN	12 892	46,18	10 804	73,35
Pavla Golasowská	KDU-ČSL	4 583	16,41	3 925	26,64
Ivo Raška	ANO	4 545	16,28	—	—
Petr Gawlas	ČSSD	3 730	13,36	—	—
Gustav Pilch	KSČM	1 356	4,85	—	—
Jan Osoba	Dawn	806	2,88	—	—

=== 2022 ===
2022 Czech Senate election in Frýdek-Místek
Candidate	Party	1st round		2nd round	
Candidate	Party	Votes	%	Votes	%
Zdeněk Matušek	ANO, ČSSD	14 087	42,33	7 519	50,98
Stanislav Folwarczny	KDU-ČSL, ODS, TOP 09	10 594	31,83	7 228	49,01
Petr Gawlas	NEZ	3 758	11,29	—	—
Petr Hamrozi	NEJ	2 822	8,48	—	—
Daniel Pawlas	DOMA	1 040	3,12	—	—
Gina Horylová	BOS	974	2,92	—	—
