= Senate district 34 – Liberec =

Electoral district in the Czech Republic

34 – Liberec
- inline Senate district of the Czech Republic

- The Liberec district on a map
- Senator: Michael Canov; SLK
- Region: Liberec
- District: Liberec
- Electorate: 112,975
- Area: 648.87 km²
- Last election: 2022
- Next election: 2028

Senate district 34 – Liberec is an electoral district of the Senate of the Czech Republic, located in parts of the Liberec District. Since 2016, a SLK member Michael Canov is Senator for the district.

== Senators ==
Year	Senator	Party
1996 (Note: Election for shortened two-year term)	Přemysl Sobotka	ODS
1998	Přemysl Sobotka	ODS
2004	Přemysl Sobotka	ODS
2010	Přemysl Sobotka	ODS
2016	Michael Canov	SLK
2022	Michael Canov	SLK

== Election results ==
=== 1996 ===
1996 Czech Senate election in Liberec
Candidate	Party	1st round		2nd round	
Candidate	Party	Votes	%	Votes	%
Přemysl Sobotka	ODS	13 539	37,47	19 592	56,31
František Sokol	ČSSD	6 853	18,97	15 202	43,69
Zdeněk Kovář	KDU-ČSL	6 598	18,26	—	—
Jaroslav Mráz	Independent	2 826	7,82	—	—
Karel Hanauer	KSČM	2 696	7,46	—	—
Alois Čvančara	ODA	1 638	4,53	—	—
Jaroslav Jáč	SŽJ	1 563	4,33	—	—
Jan Frydrych	DEU	417	1,15	—	—

=== 1998 ===
1998 Czech Senate election in Liberec
Candidate	Party	1st round		2nd round	
Candidate	Party	Votes	%	Votes	%
Přemysl Sobotka	ODS	12 364	34,51	12 746	58,14
Václav Pecina	ČSSD	7 190	20,7	9 176	41,86
Pavel Harvánek	Independent	4 845	13,52	—	—
Bohuslav Svoboda	4KOALICE	4 821	13,46	—	—
Jaroslav Morávek	KSČM	3 618	10,10	—	—
Vladimíra Hoření	DRS	2 585	7,21	—	—
Jan Horčic	PA	206	0,57	—	—
Josef Krejsa	RU	200	0,56	—	—

=== 2004 ===
2004 Czech Senate election in Liberec
Candidate	Party	1st round		2nd round	
Candidate	Party	Votes	%	Votes	%
Přemysl Sobotka	ODS	13 737	43,29	15 876	72,54
Josef Vondruška	KSČM	4 598	14,49	6 008	27,45
František Vízek	ČSSD	3 879	12,22	—	—
Miroslav Samek	NEZ	3 561	11,22	—	—
Lidie Vajnerová	SZR	2 975	9,37	—	—
Miroslav Chvála	Independent	2 664	8,39	—	—
Václav Srb	KČ	315	0,99	—	—

=== 2010 ===
2010 Czech Senate election in Liberec
Candidate	Party	1st round		2nd round	
Candidate	Party	Votes	%	Votes	%
Přemysl Sobotka	ODS	17 344	36,97	17 656	54,06
Stanislav Eichler	ČSSD	12 330	26,28	15 003	45,93
Jan Marušiak	TOP 09	6 530	13,92	—	—
Zuzana Chytrá	Suverenita	3 117	6,64	—	—
Milan Erbert	KSČM	2 877	6,13	—	—
Zdeněk Kubr	VV	2 228	4,75	—	—
Leoš Škoda	SOS	1 289	2,74	—	—
Milan Drobný	SPOZ	821	1,75	—	—
Zdeněk Joukl	ALTERNATIVA	369	0,78	—	—

=== 2016 ===
2016 Czech Senate election in Liberec
Candidate	Party	1st round		2nd round	
Candidate	Party	Votes	%	Votes	%
Michael Canov	SLK, STAN	18 698	45,31	16 579	80,19
Marek Vávra	ANO 2011	6 351	15,39	4 096	19,81
Jan Korytář	Change	4 515	10,94	—	—
Petr Hromádka	TOP 09	2 668	6,46	—	—
Pavel Ploc	ČSSD	2 382	5,77	—	—
Jaroslav Havelka	KSČM	2 291	5,55	—	—
Lidie Vajnerová	NBPLK	2 003	4,85	—	—
Martina Bufková Rychecká	ODS	1 810	4,39	—	—
Petr Černý	NOS	551	1,34	—	—

=== 2022 ===
2022 Czech Senate election in Liberec
Candidate	Party	1st round		2nd round	
Candidate	Party	Votes	%	Votes	%
Michael Canov	SLK	19 613	43,51	14 000	66,34
Radka Loučková Kotasová	ANO 2011	11 881	26,36	7 101	33,65
Martina Motshagen	ODS, KDU-ČSL, TOP 09	7 069	15,68	—	—
Svatopluk Holata	SPD	6 504	14,43	—	—
