= Senate district 49 – Blansko =

Electoral district in the Czech Republic

49 – Blansko
- inline Senate district of the Czech Republic

- The Blansko district on a map
- Senator: Jaromíra Vítková; KDU-ČSL
- Region: South Moravia
- District: Blansko; Brno-Country
- Last election: 2022
- Next election: 2028

Senate district 49 – Blansko is an electoral district of the Senate of the Czech Republic, located in the entirety of the Blansko District and the northern part of the Brno-Country District. Since 2016, the Senator for the district is Jaromíra Vítková, a member of KDU-ČSL.

== Senators ==
| Year | Senator | Party |
|---|---|---|
| 1996 | Libor Pavlů | ČSSD |
| 1998 | Stanislav Bělehrádek | 4KOALICE |
| 2004 | Vlastimil Sehnal | ODS |
| 2010 | Jozef Regec | ČSSD |
| 2016 | Jaromíra Vítková | KDU-ČSL |
| 2022 | Jaromíra Vítková | KDU-ČSL |

== Election results ==
=== 1996 ===
1996 Czech Senate election in Blansko
| Candidate | Party | 1st round | | 2nd round | |
| Candidate | Party | Votes | % | Votes | % |
|---|---|---|---|---|---|
| Libor Pavlů | ČSSD | 8 039 | 21,54 | 18 762 | 53,92 |
| Stanislav Frantel | ODS | 10 035 | 26,89 | 16 035 | 46,08 |
| Jiří Bebar | KSČM | 6 289 | 16,85 | — | — |
| Josef Hromas | KDU-ČSL | 6 141 | 16,46 | — | — |
| Pavel Henek | ODA | 3 413 | 9,15 | — | — |
| Josef Vybíhal | SŽJ | 2 162 | 5,79 | — | — |
| Petr Kavan | MSLK_96 | 1 239 | 3,32 | — | — |

=== 1998 ===
1998 Czech Senate election in Blansko
| Candidate | Party | 1st round | | 2nd round | |
| Candidate | Party | Votes | % | Votes | % |
|---|---|---|---|---|---|
| Stanislav Bělehrádek | 4KOALICE | 16 587 | 39,72 | 12 835 | 64,56 |
| Jiří Drápela | ČSSD | 9 380 | 22,46 | 7 045 | 35,44 |
| Jiří Bebar | KSČM | 8 105 | 19,41 | — | — |
| Stanislav Frantel | ODS | 7 685 | 18,40 | — | — |

=== 2004 ===
2004 Czech Senate election in Blansko
| Candidate | Party | 1st round | | 2nd round | |
| Candidate | Party | Votes | % | Votes | % |
|---|---|---|---|---|---|
| Vlastimil Sehnal | ODS | 6 434 | 21,22 | 13 440 | 54,76 |
| Zuzka Bebarová-Rujbrová | KSČM | 7 153 | 23,59 | 11 102 | 45,23 |
| Zdeněk Peša | SNK, NPM | 5 737 | 18,92 | — | — |
| Stanislav Kamba | KDU-ČSL | 5 547 | 18,29 | — | — |
| Lubomír Toufar | ČSSD | 3 261 | 10,75 | — | — |
| Jaroslav Bernášek | ED | 1 422 | 4,69 | — | — |
| Marie Salm-Reifferscheidt-Raitz | KČ | 521 | 1,71 | — | — |
| Jiří Riegert | Independent | 242 | 0,79 | — | — |

=== 2010 ===
2010 Czech Senate election in Blansko
| Candidate | Party | 1st round | | 2nd round | |
| Candidate | Party | Votes | % | Votes | % |
|---|---|---|---|---|---|
| Jozef Regec | ČSSD | 15 541 | 30,62 | 17 389 | 54,32 |
| Zdeněk Peša | KDU-ČSL | 10 771 | 21,22 | 14 619 | 45,67 |
| Karel Jarůšek | ODS | 6 760 | 13,31 | — | — |
| Stanislav Navrkal | KSČM | 5 353 | 10,54 | — | — |
| Ivana Holomková | TOP 09 | 4 922 | 9,69 | — | — |
| Josef Mikulášek | VV | 3 662 | 7,21 | — | — |
| Jindřich Vomela | Suverenity | 2 078 | 4,09 | — | — |
| Pavel Henek | KONS | 943 | 1,85 | — | — |
| Petr Rožňák | SPOZ | 526 | 1,03 | — | — |
| Miroslav Lejsek | FiS | 197 | 0,38 | — | — |

=== 2016 ===
2016 Czech Senate election in Blansko
| Candidate | Party | 1st round | | 2nd round | |
| Candidate | Party | Votes | % | Votes | % |
|---|---|---|---|---|---|
| Jaromíra Vítková | KDU-ČSL | 7 204 | 18,73 | 10 246 | 61,06 |
| Jan Machač | ODS | 5 955 | 15,48 | 6 534 | 38,93 |
| Ivo Polák | ČSSD | 5 665 | 14,73 | — | — |
| Drago Sukalovský | STAN | 5 237 | 13,61 | — | — |
| Jozef Regec | SsČR | 4 940 | 12,84 | — | — |
| Jiří Míšenský | ANO 2011 | 4 245 | 11,03 | — | — |
| Mária Koudelová | KSČM | 3 753 | 9,75 | — | — |
| Robert Štěpánek | Dawn | 1 077 | 2,80 | — | — |
| Jiří Šoltys | NáS | 380 | 0,98 | — | — |

=== 2022 ===
2022 Czech Senate election in Blansko
| Candidate | Party | 1st round | | 2nd round | |
| Candidate | Party | Votes | % | Votes | % |
|---|---|---|---|---|---|
| Jaromíra Vítková | KDU-ČSL, ODS, TOP 09 | 15 061 | 30,79 | 14 188 | 65,36 |
| Antonín Žirovnický | ANO 2011 | 8 774 | 17,93 | 7 519 | 34,63 |
| Drago Sukalovský | STAN | 6 290 | 12,85 | — | — |
| Zdeněk Wetter | ČSSD | 5 764 | 11,78 | — | — |
| Filip Vítek | Pirates | 5 366 | 10,97 | — | — |
| Jiří Rokos | SPD | 5 043 | 10,30 | — | — |
| Martin Sklář | Freeholders | 2 617 | 5,35 | — | — |
