= Senate district 1 – Karlovy Vary =

Electoral district in the Czech Republic

Coordinates: 50°14′22″N 13°11′39″E

1 – Karlovy Vary
- inline Senate district of the Czech Republic

- The Karlovy Vary district on a map
- Senator: Věra Procházková; ANO 2011
- Region: Karlovy Vary
- District: Karlovy Vary
- Electorate: 85376
- Area: 1,379.84
- Last election: 2022
- Next election: 2028

Senate district 1 – Karlovy Vary is an electoral district of the Senate of the Czech Republic, centered around the city of Karlovy Vary in the north of the Karlovy Vary District. Since 2022, Věra Procházková from ANO 2011 is representing the district.

== Senators ==
Senators for the district 1 – Karlovy Vary
Year	Senator	Party
1996 (Note: Election for shortened two-year term)	Vladimír Kulhánek	ODS
1998	Vladimír Kulhánek	ODS
2004	Jan Horník	SD-SN
2010	Jan Horník	STAN
2016	Jan Horník	STAN
2022	Věra Procházková	ANO

== Election results ==
=== 1996 ===
1996 Czech Senate election in Karlovy Vary (Note: As this was the first ever election to the Senate of the Czech Republic, Senator was elected only for two-year term.)
Candidate	Party	1st round		2nd round	
Candidate	Party	Votes	%	Votes	%
Vladimír Kulhánek	ODS	10 885	41,74	14 741	61,31
Igor Savič	ČSSD	4 435	17,01	9 301	38,69
Jan Blažek CSc.	KSČM	3 260	12,50	—	—
Petr Masák	ODA	3 007	11,53	—	—
Karel Rada	Independent	2 275	8,72	—	—
Jana Neuberová	NEZ	947	3,63	—	—
Karel Masný	SDL	767	2,94	—	—
Josef Havlíček	ČSNS	503	1,93	—	—
ODS win (new seat)					

=== 1998 ===
1998 Czech Senate election in Karlovy Vary
Candidate	Party	1st round		2nd round	
Candidate	Party	Votes	%	Votes	%
Vladimír Kulhánek	ODS	8 816	31,57	9 190	56,37
Edmund Janisch	ČSSD	6 278	22,48	7 114	43,63
Zdeněk Šmíd	4KOALICE	6 048	21,66	—	—
Jaroslav Borka	KSČM	3 701	13,25	—	—
Marie Tobolková	SZ	3 080	11,03	—	—
ODS hold					

=== 2004 ===
2004 Czech Senate election in Karlovy Vary
Candidate	Party	1st round		2nd round	
Candidate	Party	Votes	%	Votes	%
Jan Horník	SD-SN	4 859	21,25	8 244	58,18
Václav Heřman	ODS	4 770	20,86	5 925	41,81
Jaroslav Borka	KSČM	3 785	16,55	—	—
Václav Lupínek	Independent	3 767	16,47	—	—
Michael Kuneš	ČSSD	1 943	8,49	—	—
Pavla Andrejkivová	KDU-ČSL	1 647	7,20	—	—
Jan Knára	NEZ	1 061	4,64	—	—
Milan Křimský	Rozumní	721	3,15	—	—
Radan Večerka	KONS	309	1,35	—	—
SD-SN gain from ODS					

=== 2010 ===
2010 Czech Senate election in Karlovy Vary
Candidate	Party	1st round		2nd round	
Candidate	Party	Votes	%	Votes	%
Jan Horník	STAN (Note: In a coalition with TOP 09)	7 454	22,25	10 179	71,75
Josef Pavel	ODS	5 135	15,35	4 007	28,24
Jiří Vyvadil	ČSSD	5 044	15,05	—	—
Jiří Kotek	ALTERNATIVE [cs] (Note: In a coalition with Citizens [cs])	4 175	12,46	—	—
Jaroslav Borka	KSČM	4 097	12,23	—	—
Jaroslav Žák	Doctors	1 875	5,59	—	—
Jaroslav Rovný	ČSNS	1 791	5,34	—	—
Věra Procházková	Rozumní	1 746	5,21	—	—
Ivan Poustka	Victoria	1 616	4,82	—	—
František Weiss	VV	566	1,68	—	—
STAN gain from SD-SN					

=== 2016 ===
2016 Czech Senate election in Karlovy Vary
Candidate	Party	1st round		2nd round	
Candidate	Party	Votes	%	Votes	%
Jan Horník	STAN (Note: Supported by TOP 09, KDU-ČSL and KOA [cs])	6 451	23,46	8 114	66,17
Josef Váňa	ANO	5 216	18,96	4 148	33,82
Pavel Čekan	ČSSD	4 084	14,85	—	—
Jiří Brdlík	ODS	3 759	13,67	—	—
Věra Bartůňková	KSČM	2 738	9,95	—	—
Jiří Kotek	ALTERNATIVE [cs]	2 709	9,85	—	—
Eduard Frisch	SNK1 [cs]	1 685	6,12	—	—
Věra Ježková	Greens	855	3,10	—	—
STAN hold					

=== 2022 ===
2022 Czech Senate election in Karlovy Vary
Candidate	Party	1st round		2nd round	
Candidate	Party	Votes	%	Votes	%
Věra Procházková	ANO	8 343	25,86	5 924	67,97
Eva Chromcová	SPD	4 557	14,12	2 791	32,02
Martin Maleček	VOK [cs]	4 226	13,10	—	—
Jan Horník	STAN	3 977	12,32	—	—
Petr Kulhánek	KOA [cs]	3 972	12,31	—	—
Václav Slavík	KDU-ČSL (Note: Part of SPOLU coalition)	2 482	7,69	—	—
Bohdan Vaněk	Pirates	1 838	5,69	—	—
Pavel Petričko	Independent	1 376	4,26	—	—
Petr Ajšman	HEART FOR... [cs]	693	2,14	—	—
Bedřich Šmudla	PES [cs]	524	1,62	—	—
Jan Havel	DSZ	269	0,83	—	—
ANO gain from STAN					
