= Senate district 43 – Pardubice =

Electoral district in the Czech Republic

43 – Pardubice
- inline Senate district of the Czech Republic

- The Pardubice district on a map
- Senator: Miluše Horská; KDU-ČSL
- Region: Pardubice; Hradec Králové
- District: Pardubice; Hradec Králové
- Last election: 2022
- Next election: 2028

Senate district 43 – Pardubice is an electoral district of the Senate of the Czech Republic, located in the western part of the Pardubice District and the south-western part of the Hradec Králové District. Since 2010, the Senator for the district is Miluše Horská, elected as a candidate of KDU-ČSL.

== Senators ==
Year	Senator	Electoral party
1996 (Note: Election for shortened two-year term)	Jaroslava Moserová	ODA
1998	Jaroslava Moserová	4KOALICE
2004	Jiří Stříteský	ODS
2010	Miluše Horská	Independent
2016	Miluše Horská	Independent
2022	Miluše Horská	KDU-ČSL

== Election results ==
=== 1996 ===
1996 Czech Senate election in Pardubice
Candidate	Party	1st round		2nd round	
Candidate	Party	Votes	%	Votes	%
Jaroslava Moserová	ODA	8 267	20,58	17 330	56,06
Hana Tomanová	ODS	14 519	36,14	13 581	43,94
Ota Karen	ČSSD	7 590	18,90	—	—
Zdeněk Mareš	KSČM	5 875	14,63	—	—
Marta Novotná	SŽJ	2 121	5,28	—	—
Jaroslav Sýkora	Independent	1 797	4,47	—	—

=== 1998 ===
1998 Czech Senate election in Pardubice
Candidate	Party	1st round		2nd round	
Candidate	Party	Votes	%	Votes	%
Jaroslava Moserová	4KOALICE	13 609	32,21	13 034	59,97
Václav Stříteský	ODS	10 360	24,52	8 702	40,03
Slavěna Broulíková	ČSSD	9 832	23,27	—	—
Václav Snopek	KSČM	6 403	15,16	—	—
Emil Efler	Independent	2 041	4,83	—	—

=== 2004 ===
2004 Czech Senate election in Pardubice
Candidate	Party	1st round		2nd round	
Candidate	Party	Votes	%	Votes	%
Jiří Stříteský	ODS	12 834	38,61	10 304	53,84
Jaroslava Moserová	US-DEU	8 750	26,32	8 834	46,15
Václav Snopek	KSČM	6 134	18,45	—	—
Zdeněk Černý	ČSSD	3 440	10,35	—	—
Stanislav Baťa	NEZ	1 245	3,74	—	—
Jiří Bezák	SŽJ	832	2,50	—	—

=== 2010 ===
2010 Czech Senate election in Pardubice
Candidate	Party	1st round		2nd round	
Candidate	Party	Votes	%	Votes	%
Miluše Horská	NK	8 751	19,50	14 944	52,23
Jiří Komárek	ČSSD	9 973	22,22	13 666	47,76
Jiří Málek	VV	8 170	18,20	—	—
Jiří Stříteský	ODS	6 895	15,36	—	—
Václav Snopek	KSČM	5 019	11,18	—	—
Vladimír Engelmajer	ČSR	3 494	7,78	—	—
Marta Lederová	Suverenity	1 571	3,50	—	—
Petr Janko	SPOZ	1 003	2,23	—	—

=== 2016 ===
2016 Czech Senate election in Pardubice
Candidate	Party	1st round		2nd round	
Candidate	Party	Votes	%	Votes	%
Miluše Horská	NK, KDU-ČSL	10 020	27,28	9 849	70,29
Jaroslav Menšík	ANO 2011	5 720	15,57	4 161	29,70
Vladimír Ninger	ČSSD	4 925	13,41	—	—
David Novák	ODS	3 870	10,53	—	—
Pavel Studnička	KSČM	3 418	9,30	—	—
Jiří Čáslavka	TOP 09, STAN	3 217	8,76	—	—
Emanuel Žďárský	NSK	1 962	5,34	—	—
Petr Štěpánek	APAČI 2017	1 404	3,82	—	—
Petr Novotný	SsČR	1 205	3,28	—	—
Karel Daňhel	Dawn	981	2,67	—	—

=== 2022 ===
2022 Czech Senate election in Pardubice
Candidate	Party	1st round		2nd round	
Candidate	Party	Votes	%	Votes	%
Miluše Horská	KDU-ČSL, NK	16 457	39,05	13 438	57,23
Martin Charvát	ANO 2011	14 454	34,29	10 042	42,76
Jaromír Nosek	SPD	4 906	11,64	—	—
Vladimír Ninger	ČSSD, SsČR	2 761	6,55	—	—
Svatopluk Pleva	BOS	2 109	5,00	—	—
Milan Bušek	Independent	1 453	3,44	—	—
