= Senate district 37 – Jičín =

Electoral district in the Czech Republic

37 – Jičín
- inline Senate district of the Czech Republic

- The Jičín district on a map
- Senator: Tomáš Czernin; TOP 09
- Region: Hradec Králové; Central Bohemia
- District: Jičín; Nymburk
- Electorate: 116,175
- Area: 1,509.33 km²
- Last election: 2022
- Next election: 2028

Senate district 37 – Jičín is an electoral district of the Senate of the Czech Republic, located in the entirety of the Jičín District and parts of the Nymburk District. Since 2016, a TOP 09 member Tomáš Czernin is Senator for the district.

== Senators ==
Year	Senator	Party
1996 (Note: Election for shortened two-year term)	Jiří Liška	ODS
1998	Jiří Liška	ODS
2004	Jiří Liška	ODS
2010	Josef Táborský	ČSSD
2016	Tomáš Czernin	TOP 09
2022	Tomáš Czernin	TOP 09

== Election results ==
=== 1996 ===
1996 Czech Senate election in Jičín
Candidate	Party	1st round		2nd round	
Candidate	Party	Votes	%	Votes	%
Jiří Liška	ODS	15 932	44,79	18 736	56,52
Josef Horáček	ČSSD	7 617	21,41	14 412	43,48
Karel Šibrava	KSČM	5 684	15,98	—	—
Luděk Puš	KDU-ČSL	4 713	13,25	—	—
Radko Pavlovec	DEU	1 623	4,56	—	—

=== 1998 ===
1998 Czech Senate election in Jičín
Candidate	Party	1st round		2nd round	
Candidate	Party	Votes	%	Votes	%
Jiří Liška	ODS	15 852	40,20	13 097	64,06
František Ringo Čech	ČSSD	8 157	20,68	7 347	35,94
Čestmír Jung	4KOALICE	7 433	18,85	—	—
Jan Novák	KSČM	5 692	14,43	—	—
Jiří Drobeček	ČSNS	2 302	5,84	—	—

=== 2004 ===
2004 Czech Senate election in Jičín
Candidate	Party	1st round		2nd round	
Candidate	Party	Votes	%	Votes	%
Jiří Liška	ODS	12 529	47,13	14 113	71,40
Vladimír Jeník	KSČM	4 493	16,90	5 653	28,59
Jiří Vitvar	KDU-ČSL	4 237	15,93	—	—
Miloš Petera	ČSSD	3 326	12,51	—	—
Iva Dousková	NEZ	1 996	7,50	—	—

=== 2010 ===
2010 Czech Senate election in Jičín
Candidate	Party	1st round		2nd round	
Candidate	Party	Votes	%	Votes	%
Josef Táborský	ČSSD	11 635	24,97	14 558	54,09
Jiří Liška	ODS	12 680	27,21	12 352	45,90
Tomáš Czernin	TOP 09, STAN	8 619	18,50	—	—
Jiří Kuhn	KDU-ČSL	4 629	9,93	—	—
Otakar Ruml	KSČM	4 553	9,77	—	—
Miroslav Voda	Suverenity	2 314	4,96	—	—
Jiří Hvězda	VV	2 155	4,62	—	—

=== 2016 ===
2016 Czech Senate election in Jičín
Candidate	Party	1st round		2nd round	
Candidate	Party	Votes	%	Votes	%
Tomáš Czernin	TOP 09, STAN	10 472	28,51	11 075	59,13
Jan Malý	ANO 2011	9 226	25,11	7 653	40,86
Josef Táborský	ČSSD	5 211	14,18	—	—
Věra Beranová	KSČM	4 222	11,49	—	—
Ivan Doležal	ODS	3 765	10,25	—	—
Jiří Fiala	Rozumní	2 663	7,25	—	—
Vladimír Dryml	Úsvit	1 171	3,18	—	—

=== 2022 ===
2022 Czech Senate election in Jičín
Candidate	Party	1st round		2nd round	
Candidate	Party	Votes	%	Votes	%
Tomáš Czernin	TOP 09, ODS, KDU-ČSL	14 618	28,99	14 449	53,83
Jaromír Dědeček	ANO 2011	13 198	26,17	12 391	46,16
Dana Kracíková	STAN	6 498	12,88	—	—
René Franěk	Svobodní	5 619	11,14	—	—
Eva Kotyzová	SPD	5 041	9,99	—	—
Marta Martinová	Pirates	3 639	7,21	—	—
Václav Ort	KSČM	1 809	3,58	—	—
