= Senate district 10 – Český Krumlov =

Electoral district in the Czech Republic

Coordinates: 48°55′59″N 14°19′32″E

10 – Český Krumlov
- inline Senate district of the Czech Republic

- The Český Krumlov district on a map
- Senator: Tomáš Jirsa; Civic Democratic Party
- Region: South Bohemian
- District: Český Krumlov; Prachatice; České Budějovice
- Electorate: 117847
- Area: 3,531.34km² km²
- Last election: 2022
- Next election: 2028

Senate district 9 – Český Krumlov is an electoral district of the Senate of the Czech Republic, centered around the city of Český Krumlov and consisting of the whole of Český Krumlov District and parts of Prachatice District and České Budějovice District. Since 2004, ODS member Tomáš Jirsa is Senator for the district.

== Senators ==
Year	Senator	Party
1996 (Note: Election for shortened two-year term)	Karel Vachta	ČSSD
1998	Martin Dvořák	ODS
2004	Tomáš Jirsa	ODS
2010	Tomáš Jirsa	ODS
2016	Tomáš Jirsa	ODS
2022	Tomáš Jirsa	ODS

== Election results ==
=== 1996 ===
1996 Czech Senate election in Český Krumlov
Candidate	Party	1st round		2nd round	
Candidate	Party	Votes	%	Votes	%
Karel Vachta	ČSSD	6 605	20,49	15 695	51,77
Eva Dudáková	ODS	8 614	26,72	14 619	48,23
Jiří Netík	KDU-ČSL	4 897	15,19	—	—
Jaroslav Zámečník	KSČM	4 858	15,07	—	—
Milan Marko	Independent	3 767	11,69	—	—
Jan Vondrouš	Independent	3 491	10,83	—	—

=== 1998 ===
1998 Czech Senate election in Český Krumlov
Candidate	Party	1st round		2nd round	
Candidate	Party	Votes	%	Votes	%
Martin Dvořák	ODS	12 019	32,55	9 309	52,83
Karel Vachta	ČSSD	9 445	25,58	8 312	47,17
Zdeněk Štěpán	4KOALICE	6 389	17,30	—	—
Viliam Koršala	KSČM	5 102	13,82	—	—
Zdeněk Troup	Independent	3 973	10,76	—	—

=== 2004 ===
2004 Czech Senate election in Český Krumlov
Candidate	Party	1st round		2nd round	
Candidate	Party	Votes	%	Votes	%
Tomáš Jirsa	ODS	12 885	48,10	13 821	71,51
Miloslav Šimánek	KSČM	4 952	18,48	5 505	28,48
Karel Vachta	ČSSD	4 602	17,18	—	—
Jan Vondrouš	KDU-ČSL	3 655	13,64	—	—
Koloman Markovič	NEZ	690	2,57	—	—

=== 2010 ===
2010 Czech Senate election in Český Krumlov
Candidate	Party	1st round		2nd round	
Candidate	Party	Votes	%	Votes	%
Tomáš Jirsa	ODS	16 367	33,41	15 129	54,70
Vladimír Špidla	ČSSD	11 649	23,78	12 526	45,29
Zdeněk Troup	TOP 09	8 795	17,95	—	—
Luboš Dvořák	KSČM	5 322	10,86	—	—
Jan Zasadil	KDU-ČSL	3 844	7,84	—	—
Roman Bureš	Rozumní	1 601	3,26	—	—
Bohumil Bezemek	SPOZ	1 396	2,85	—	—

=== 2016 ===
2016 Czech Senate election in Český Krumlov
Candidate	Party	1st round		2nd round	
Candidate	Party	Votes	%	Votes	%
Tomáš Jirsa	ODS	11 458	32,10	10 843	59,74
Jindřich Florián	ČSSD	8 469	23,72	7 306	40,25
Miroslav Máče	KSČM	4 603	12,89	—	—
David Jan Žák	TOP 09, STAN	3 522	9,86	—	—
Jitka Zikmundová	KDU-ČSL	2 743	7,68	—	—
Tomáš Novák	Pirates	2 053	5,75	—	—
Pavel Himl	SZ	1 286	3,60	—	—
Marie Paukejová	Dawn	975	2,73	—	—
Radim Hreha	APAČI 2017	582	1,36	—	—

=== 2022 ===
2022 Czech Senate election in Český Krumlov
Candidate	Party	1st round		2nd round	
Candidate	Party	Votes	%	Votes	%
Tomáš Jirsa	ODS	17 378	36,53	12 188	66,36
Miroslav Lorenc	ANO 2011	8 307	17,46	6 177	33,63
Dalibor Uhlíř	NEZ	7 814	16,42	—	—
Robert Huneš	KDU-ČSL	7 717	16,22	—	—
Václav Mikeš	SPD	6 351	13,35	—	—
