= Senate district 55 – Brno-City =

Electoral district in the Czech Republic

55 – Brno-City
- inline Senate district of the Czech Republic

- The Brno-City district on a map
- Senator: Tomáš Töpfer; ODS
- Region: South Moravia
- District: Brno-Country; Brno-City
- Last election: 2022
- Next election: 2028

Senate district 55 – Brno-City is an electoral district of the Senate of the Czech Republic, located in the western part of the Brno-Country District and the western part of the Brno-City District. Since 2022, the Senator for the district is Tomáš Töpfer, an independent elected for the SPOLU coalition (KDU-ČSL, ODS and TOP 09).

== Senators ==
Year	Senator	Party
1996	Vlasta Svobodová	ODS
1998	Tomáš Julínek	ODS
2004	Tomáš Julínek	ODS
2010	Jan Žaloudík	ČSSD
2016	Jan Žaloudík	ČSSD
2022	Tomáš Töpfer	ODS

== Election results ==
=== 1996 ===
1996 Czech Senate election in Brno-City
Candidate	Party	1st round		2nd round	
Candidate	Party	Votes	%	Votes	%
Vlasta Svobodová	ODS	11 470	35,72	18 149	59,71
Pavel Pavlík	KSČM	6 334	19,73	12 246	40,29
Zdeněk Stránský	ČSSD	5 867	18,27	—	—
Miroslav Richter	Independent	4 502	14,02	—	—
Jiří Březa	ODA	2 901	9,04	—	—
Jan Treful	MSLK_96	1 034	3,22	—	—

=== 1998 ===
1998 Czech Senate election in Brno-City
Candidate	Party	1st round		2nd round	
Candidate	Party	Votes	%	Votes	%
Tomáš Julínek	ODS	11 062	30,78	11 780	57,03
Pavel Pavlík	KSČM	8 505	23,67	8 877	42,97
Václav Benda	4KOALICE	7 995	22,25	—	—
Stanislav Fiala	ČSSD	6 007	16,72	—	—
Jiří Bílý	HSMS-MNSj	2 367	6,59	—	—

=== 2004 ===
2004 Czech Senate election in Brno-City
Candidate	Party	1st round		2nd round	
Candidate	Party	Votes	%	Votes	%
Tomáš Julínek	ODS	8 712	33,72	11 896	66,68
Iljič Procházka	KSČM	5 198	20,12	5 942	33,31
Josef Hájek	KDU-ČSL	5 006	19,37	—	—
Vilém Buriánek	ČSSD	3 184	12,32	—	—
Vít Unzeitig	NEZ	2 531	9,79	—	—
Jiří Tomek	US-DEU	580	2,24	—	—
Radomír Malý	NSJ	335	1,29	—	—
Antonín Žiška	M	285	1,10	—	—

=== 2010 ===
2010 Czech Senate election in Brno-City
Candidate	Party	1st round		2nd round	
Candidate	Party	Votes	%	Votes	%
Jan Žaloudík	ČSSD	15 709	32,37	21 684	67,31
Tomáš Julínek	ODS	9 607	19,79	10 527	32,68
Vojtěch Adam	KSČM	8 300	17,10	—	—
František Svoboda	KDU-ČSL	6 297	12,97	—	—
Karel Bořecký	TOP 09	4 668	9,61	—	—
Vladimír Paulík	VV	1 945	4,00	—	—
Daniela Magálová	SPOZ	1 017	2,09	—	—
Ivan Čadeni	Suverenity	984	2,02	—	—

=== 2016 ===
2016 Czech Senate election in Brno-City
Candidate	Party	1st round		2nd round	
Candidate	Party	Votes	%	Votes	%
Jan Žaloudík	ČSSD	7 011	18,62	7 034	52,63
Pavel Staněk	ANO 2011	7 397	19,65	6 329	47,36
Jiří Ventruba	ODS	6 650	17,67	—	—
Michal Burian	STAN	6 499	17,26	—	—
Radoslav Skála	KSČM	4 797	12,74	—	—
Bohuslav Klíma	Moravané	2 694	7,15	—	—
Jiří Brančík	SaS	1 296	3,44	—	—
Ivo Minařík	Dawn	1 289	3,42	—	—

=== 2022 ===
2022 Czech Senate election in Brno-City
Candidate	Party	1st round		2nd round	
Candidate	Party	Votes	%	Votes	%
Tomáš Töpfer	ODS, KDU-ČSL, TOP 09	14 866	30,23	12 633	52,79
Bořek Semrád	ANO 2011	12 887	26,21	11 294	47,20
Radomír Pavlíček	STAN	6 988	14,21	—	—
Tomáš Kotas	SPD	4 359	8,86	—	—
Petra Rédová Fajmonová	PRO 2022	3 971	8,07	—	—
Bohumil Smutný	KSČM	3 169	6,44	—	—
Pavel Trčala	MZH, Moravané	2 925	5,94	—	—
