= Senate district 76 – Kroměříž =

Electoral district in the Czech Republic

76 – Kroměříž
- inline Senate district of the Czech Republic

- The Kroměříž district on a map
- Senator: Jana Zwyrtek Hamplová; NEZ
- Region: Zlín; South Moravian
- District: Kroměříž; Vyškov
- Last election: 2022
- Next election: 2028

Senate district 76 – Kroměříž is an electoral district of the Senate of the Czech Republic, located in the entirety of the Kroměříž District and the eastern part of the Vyškov District. Since 2022, the Senator for the district has been Jana Zwyrtek Hamplová, elected as an independent for Nezávislí.

== Senators ==
Year	Senator	Party
1996	Eva Nováková	KDU-ČSL
1998	František Kroupa	4KOALICE
2004	Zdeněk Janalík	ODS
2010	Miloš Malý	ČSSD
2016	Šárka Jelínková	KDU-ČSL
2022	Jana Zwyrtek Hamplová	NEZ

== Election results ==
=== 1996 ===
1996 Czech Senate election in Kroměříž
Candidate	Party	1st round		2nd round	
Candidate	Party	Votes	%	Votes	%
Eva Nováková	KDU-ČSL	6 827	21,49	11 379	55,18
Jiří Jachan	ODS	9 140	28,78	9 243	44,82
Josef Vitásek	ČSSD	6 241	19,65	—	—
Jaroslav Adamík	KSČM	5 531	17,41	—	—
Josef Palíšek	Independent	2 479	7,81	—	—
Ivan Dřímal	MSLK 96	1 470	6,09	—	—
Pavel Mozga	Independent	609	1,92	—	—

=== 1998 ===
1998 Czech Senate election in Kroměříž
Candidate	Party	1st round		2nd round	
Candidate	Party	Votes	%	Votes	%
František Kroupa	4KOALICE	10 029	29,49	9 637	56,86
Jan Slanina	ČSSD	7 527	22,13	7 311	43,14
Jaroslav Adamík	KSČM	6 798	19,99	—	—
Miloš Horanský	ODS	4 611	13,56	—	—
Josef Horák	Independent	4 245	12,48	—	—
Antonín Žiška	HSMS-MNSJ	800	2,35	—	—

=== 2004 ===
2004 Czech Senate election in Kroměříž
Candidate	Party	1st round		2nd round	
Candidate	Party	Votes	%	Votes	%
Zdeněk Janalík	ODS	7 250	30,05	12 051	65,58
Ludmila Štaudnerová	KSČM	4 928	20,43	6 324	34,41
Vojtěch Jurčík	KDU-ČSL	4 349	18,03	—	—
Miloš Malý	ČSSD	2 992	12,14	—	—
Jarmila Číhalová	US-DEU	2 274	9,42	—	—
František Kroupa	SNK	1 470	6,09	—	—
Petr Pálka	NEZ	856	3,54	—	—

=== 2010 ===
2010 Czech Senate election in Kroměříž
Candidate	Party	1st round		2nd round	
Candidate	Party	Votes	%	Votes	%
Miloš Malý	ČSSD	10 315	25,04	13 191	53,86
Zdeněk Janalík	ODS	9 586	23,27	11 298	46,13
Zdeněk Pánek	KDU-ČSL	6 472	15,71	—	—
Lenka Mergenthalová	TOP 09, STAN	4 306	10,45	—	—
Jaroslav Adamík	KSČM	4 202	10,20	—	—
Zdeňka Dokoupilová	SZ	2 684	6,51	—	—
Pavel Dohnal	M	1 738	4,22	—	—
Ignác Hoza	VV	1 149	2,79	—	—
Lubomír Nečas	SPOZ	729	1,77	—	—

=== 2016 ===
2016 Czech Senate election in Kroměříž
Candidate	Party	1st round		2nd round	
Candidate	Party	Votes	%	Votes	%
Šárka Jelínková	KDU-ČSL	5 197	16,94	8 023	53,48
Jan Hašek	ANO	4 929	16,07	6 977	46,51
Daniela Hebnarová	ODS	4 429	14,44	—	—
Eva Badinková	KSČM	3 813	12,43	—	—
Jaroslav Chmelař	ČSSD	3 609	11,76	—	—
Vojtěch Škrabal	STAN	3 469	11,31	—	—
Zdeněk Zlámal	NEZ	3 441	11,22	—	—
Josef Novák	SPO	1 135	3,70	—	—
Petr Šico	KČ	643	2,09	—	—

=== 2022 ===
2022 Czech Senate election in Kroměříž
Candidate	Party	1st round		2nd round	
Candidate	Party	Votes	%	Votes	%
Jana Zwyrtek Hamplová	NEZ	7 854	18,87	9 031	50,65
Lucie Pluhařová	ANO	8 721	20,95	8 798	49,34
Šárka Jelínková	KDU-ČSL, ODS, TOP 09	7 624	18,31	—	—
Rudolf Seifert	STAN	7 262	17,44	—	—
Olga Sehnalová	ČSSD	7 085	17,02	—	—
Stanislav Skála	SPD	3 074	7,38	—	—
