= Senate district 13 – Tábor =

Electoral district in the Czech Republic

Coordinates: 49°23′29″N 14°27′43″E

13 – Tábor
- inline Senate district of the Czech Republic

- The Tábor district on a map
- Senator: Marek Slabý; Tábor 2020
- Region: South Bohemian; Central Bohemian
- District: Tábor; Písek
- Electorate: 111258
- Area: 2,111.45 km²
- Last election: 2022
- Next election: 2028

Senate district 13 – Tábor is an electoral district of the Senate of the Czech Republic, centered around the city of Tábor and consisting of the whole of Tábor District and parts of the Písek District. Since 2020, Tábor 2020 nominee Tomáš Jirsa is Senator for the district.

== Senators ==
Year	Senator	Party
1996 (Note: Election for shortened two-year term)	Pavel Eybert	ODS
1998	Pavel Eybert	ODS
2004	Pavel Eybert	ODS
2010	Pavel Eybert	ODS
2016	Jaroslav Větrovský	ANO 2011
2022	Marek Slabý	T2020

== Election results ==
=== 1996 ===
1996 Czech Senate election in Tábor
Candidate	Party	1st round		2nd round	
Candidate	Party	Votes	%	Votes	%
Pavel Eybert	ODS	16 119	42,88	19 769	52,96
Pavel Seifer	ČSSD	8 686	23,11	17 558	47,04
Jiří Vaníček	ODA	6 495	17,28	—	—
Jiří Vrba	KSČM	5 656	15,05	—	—
Vladimír Trojáček	ČMUS	637	1,69	—	—

=== 1998 ===
1998 Czech Senate election in Tábor
Candidate	Party	1st round		2nd round	
Candidate	Party	Votes	%	Votes	%
Pavel Eybert	ODS	14 897	36,91	12 562	59,52
Jaroslav Kopecký	ČSSD	8 735	21,64	8 543	40,48
Josef Kolář	4KOALICE	6 865	17,01	—	—
Ivan Nadberežný	KSČM	6 750	16,72	—	—
Lubor Tůma	SKS	3 113	7,71	—	—

=== 2004 ===
2004 Czech Senate election in Tábor
Candidate	Party	1st round		2nd round	
Candidate	Party	Votes	%	Votes	%
Pavel Eybert	ODS	14 361	48,34	14 137	65,25
Stanislav Kázecký	ČSSD	5 668	19,08	7 527	34,74
Vlasta Parkanová	KDU-ČSL	5 082	17,10	—	—
Ivan Nadberežný	KSČM	4 595	15,46	—	—

=== 2010 ===
2010 Czech Senate election in Tábor
Candidate	Party	1st round		2nd round	
Candidate	Party	Votes	%	Votes	%
Pavel Eybert	ODS	18 922	39,94	15 520	51,20
Jan Mládek	ČSSD	13 932	29,40	14 790	48,79
Zdeněk Straka	KSČM	4 959	10,46	—	—
Petr Krůček	TOP 09	4 252	8,97	—	—
Iveta Vilímková	Suverenita	1 906	4,02	—	—
Jaroslav Hejl	KDU-ČSL	1 874	3,92	—	—
Vilém Mikula	ČSNS 2005	938	1,98	—	—
Jindřich Goetz	SPOZ	589	1,24	—	—

=== 2016 ===
2016 Czech Senate election in Tábor
Candidate	Party	1st round		2nd round	
Candidate	Party	Votes	%	Votes	%
Jaroslav Větrovský	ANO 2011	6 882	17,83	11 643	59,83
Jan Mládek	ČSSD	6 794	17,60	7 814	40,16
Jiří Fišer	T2020, STAN	6 358	16,47	—	—
Jindřich Bláha	ODS	5 537	14,34	—	—
Pavel Klíma	TOP 09	4 647	12,04	—	—
Ladislav Šedivý	KSČM	3 740	9,69	—	—
Martin Konvička	APAČI 2017	3 117	8,07	—	—
Petr Král	Pirates	1 517	3,93	—	—

=== 2022 ===
2022 Czech Senate election in Tábor
Candidate	Party	1st round		2nd round	
Candidate	Party	Votes	%	Votes	%
Marek Slabý	T2020, KDU-ČSL, ODS, TOP 09	14 186	30,00	10 676	53,47
Jaroslav Větrovský	JIH 12	10 718	22,67	9 289	46,52
Martin Kupec	ANO 2011	8 871	18,76	—	—
Olga Bastlová	ČSSD	3 195	6,75	—	—
Jiří Šimánek	STAN	2 825	5,97	—	—
Miloš Zábranský	SPD	2 531	5,35	—	—
Evžen Zadražil	Svobodní	2 501	5,28	—	—
Martin Kákona	Pirates	2 060	4,35	—	—
Jiří Machač	Independent	391	0,82	—	—
