= 2022 Czech Senate election =

- 23–24 September 2022 (first round); 30 September–1 October 2022 (second round)

27 of the 81 seats in the Senate
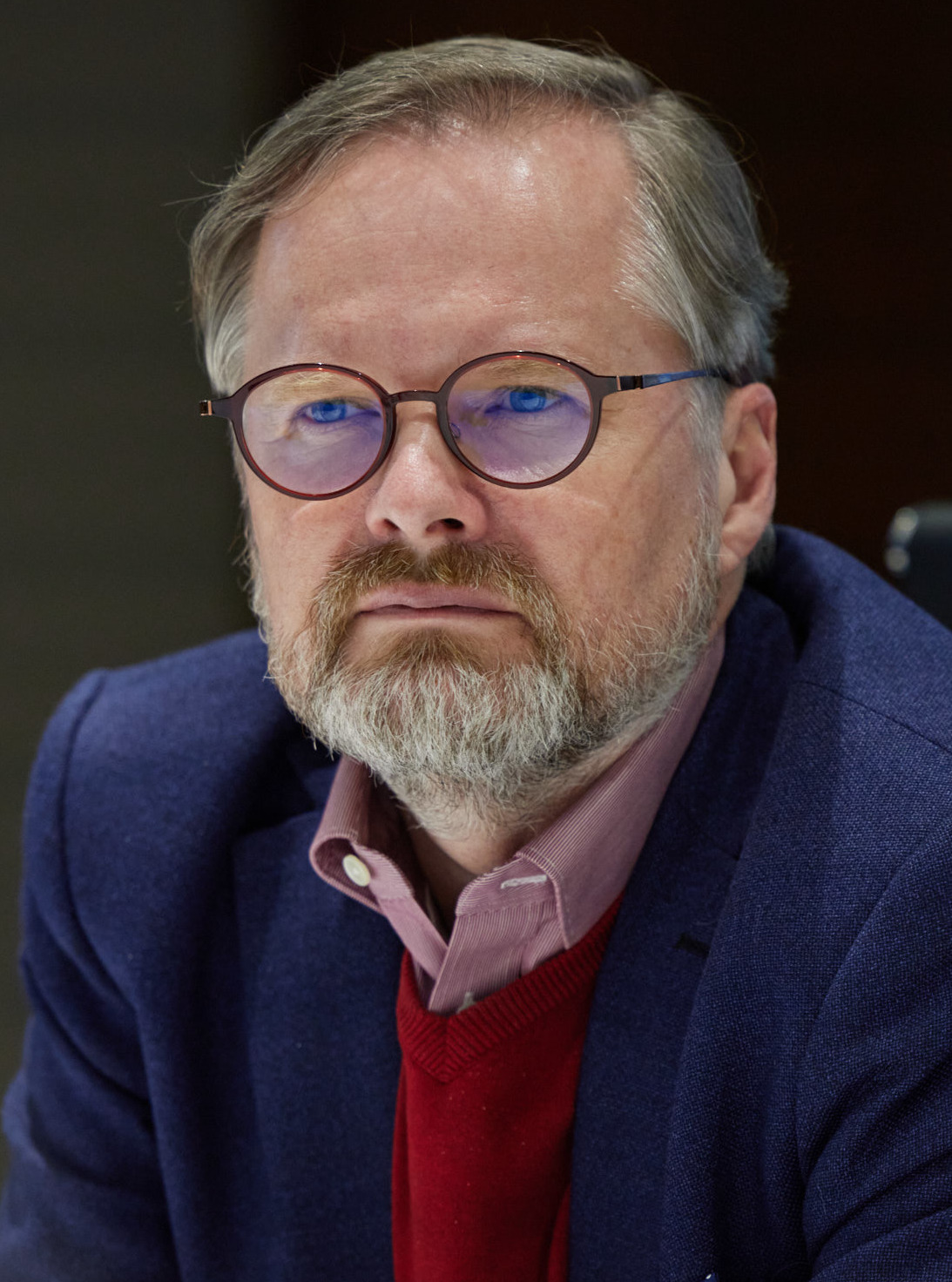

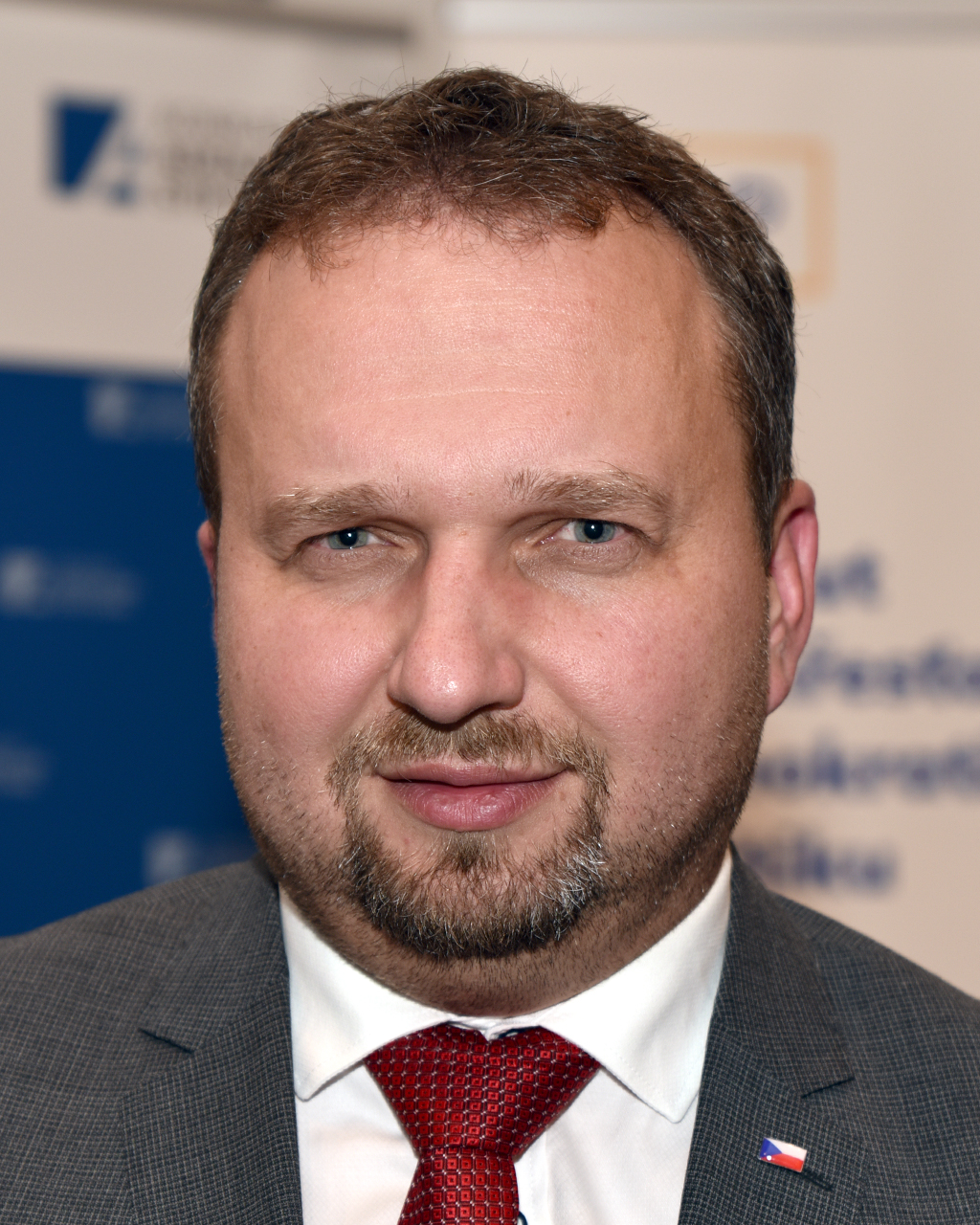

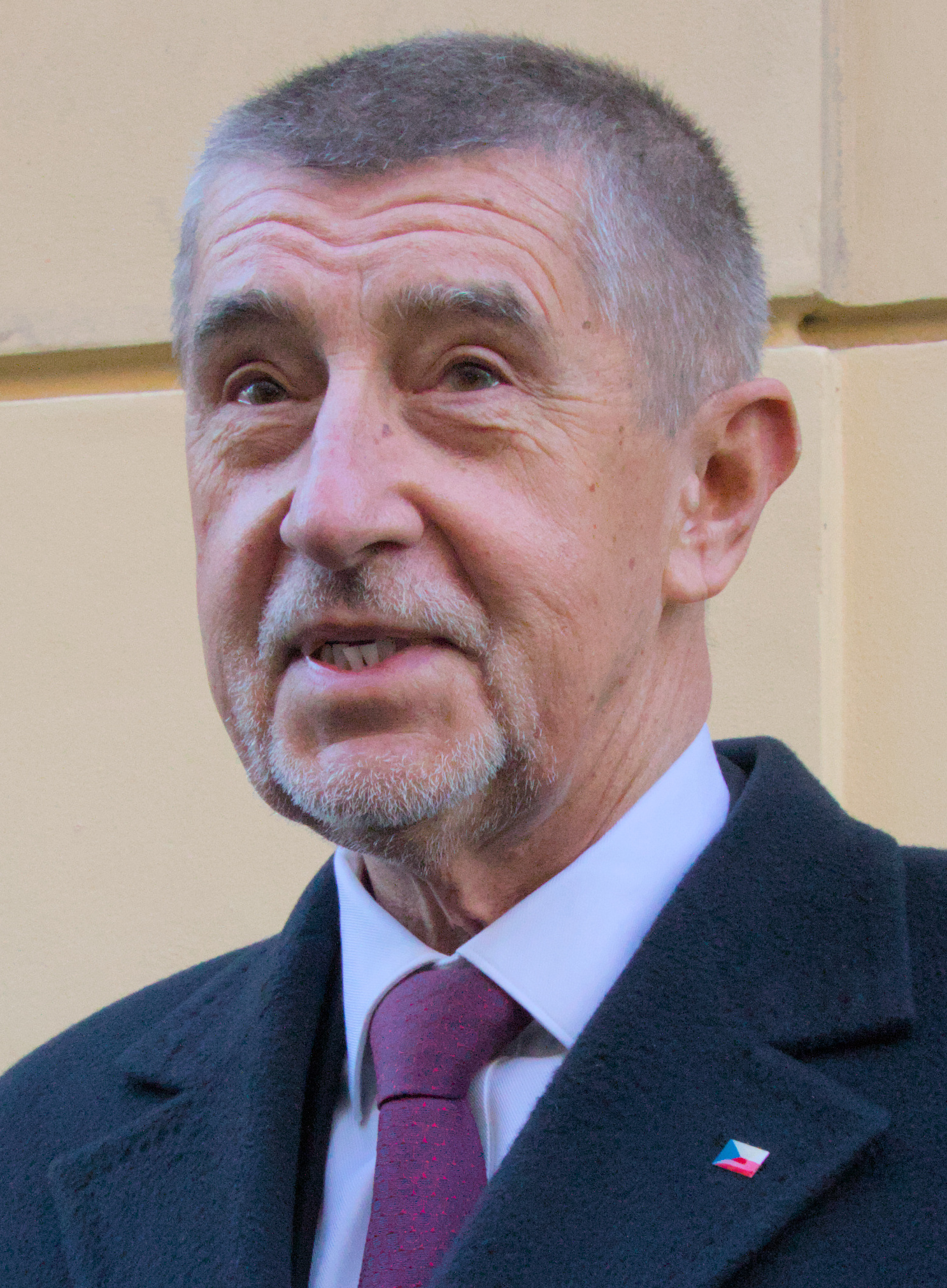

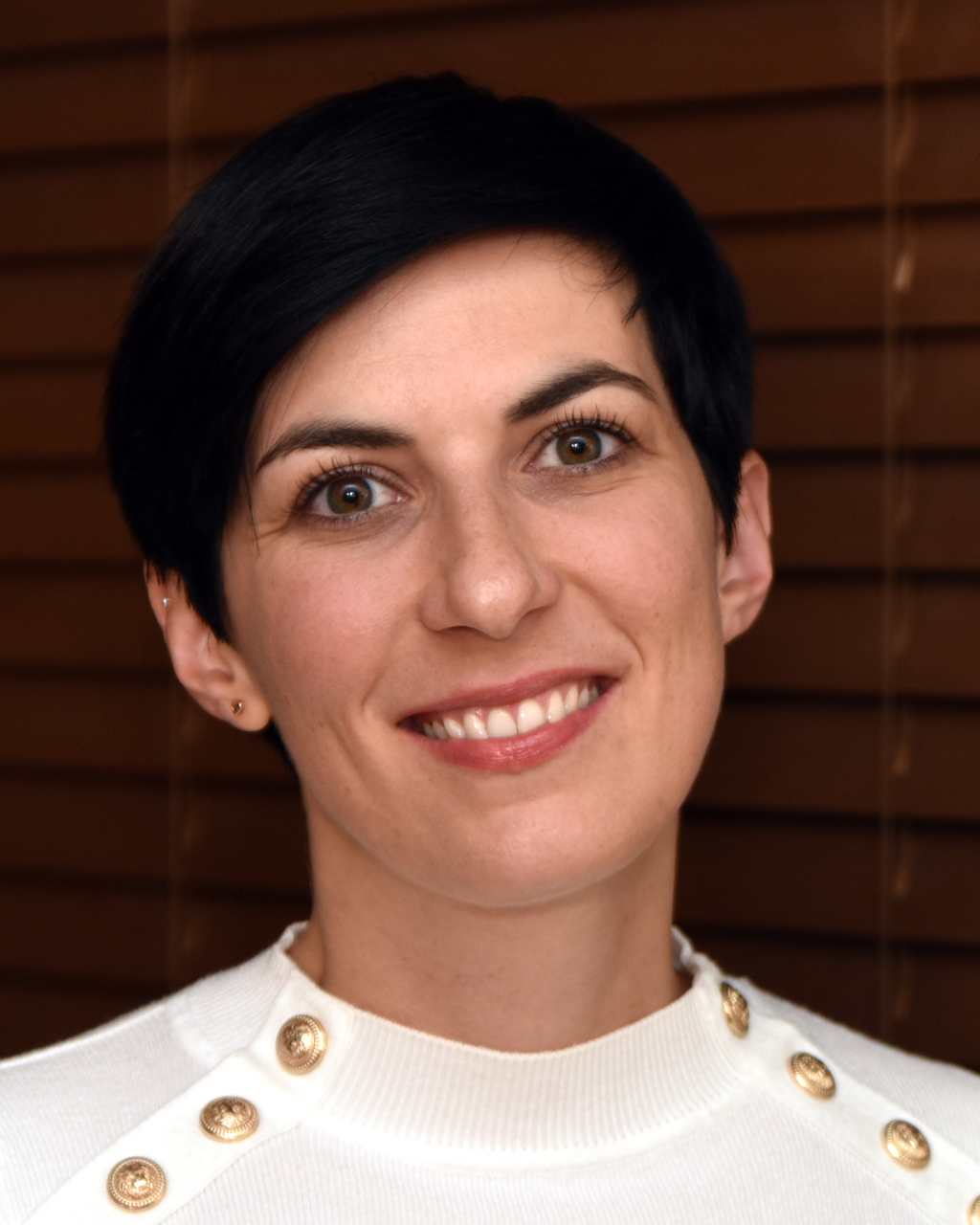

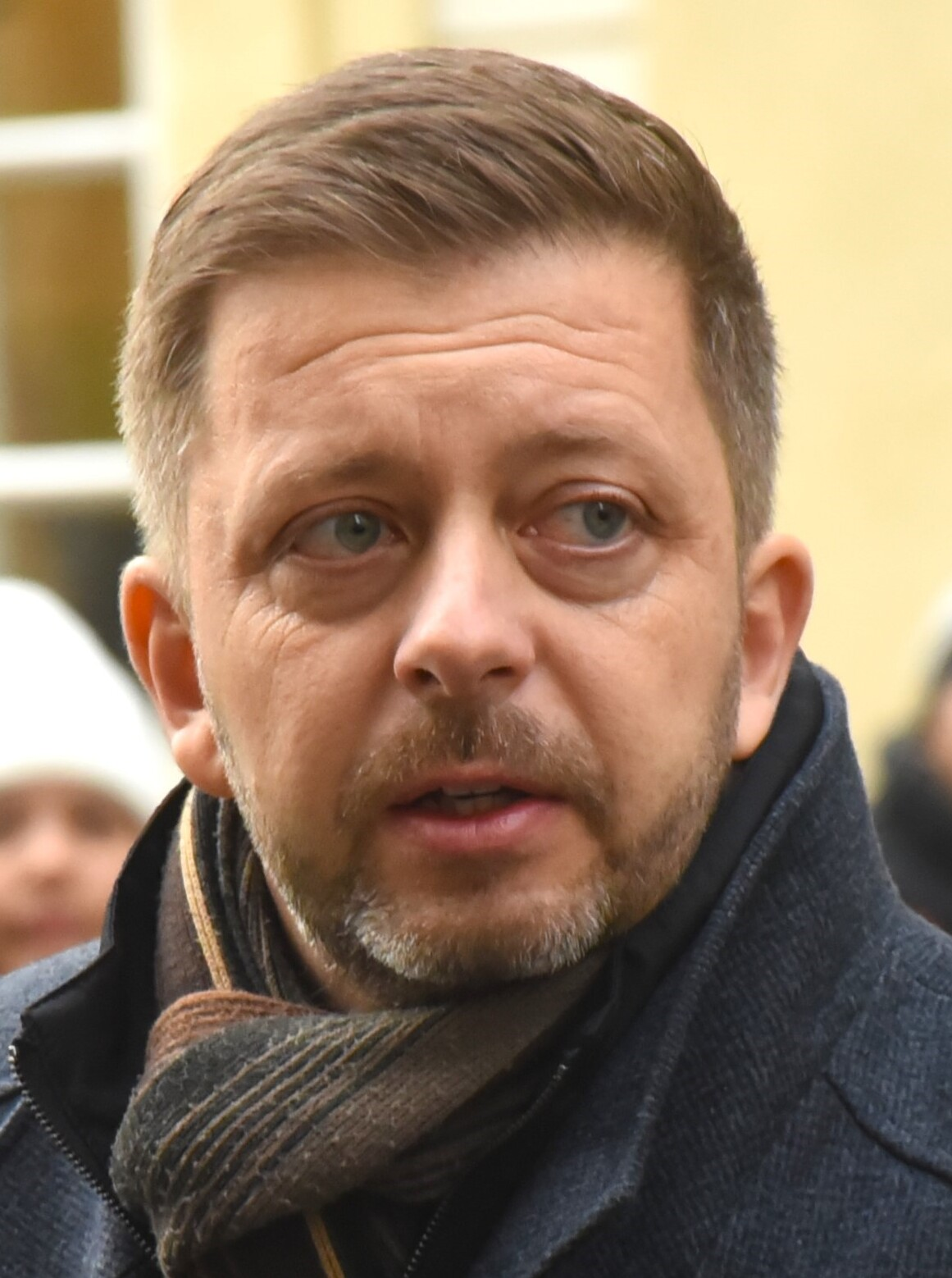

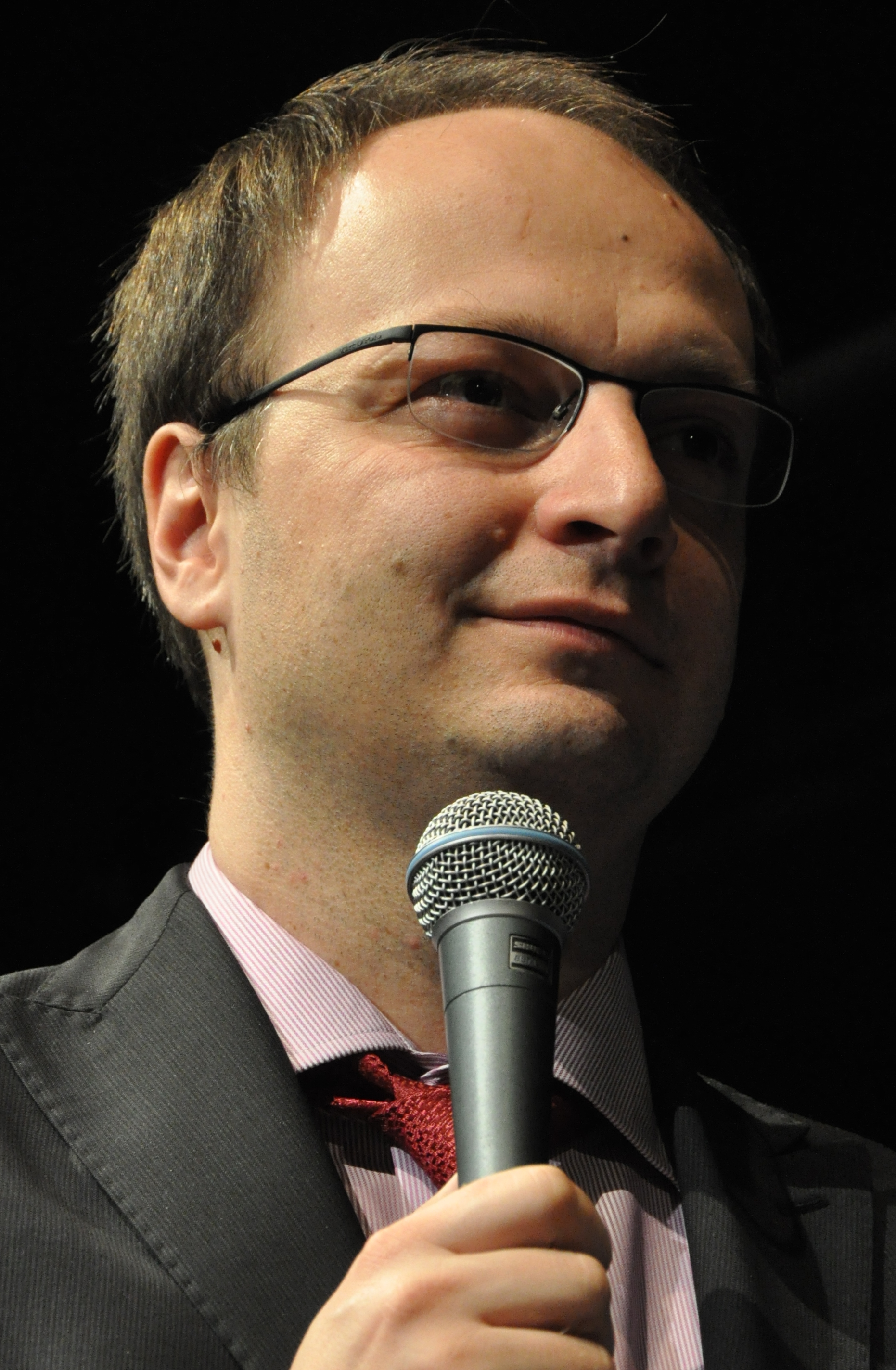
	First party	Second party	Third party
Leader	Petr Fiala	Marian Jurečka	Andrej Babiš
Party	ODS	KDU-ČSL	ANO
Last election	3	6	3
Seats won	8	7	3
Seat change	▲5	▲1	0
First round	151,908; 13.7%	120,972; 10.9%	244,516; 22%
Second round	111,071; 23.2%	74,696; 15.6%	149,331; 31.1%
	Fourth party	Fifth party	Sixth party
Leader	Markéta Pekarová Adamová	Vít Rakušan	Václav Láska
Party	TOP 09	STAN	SEN 21
Last election	2	3	0
Seats won	3	1	1
Seat change	▲1	▼2	▲1
First round	73,473; 6.6%	95,019; 8.5%	27,672; 2.5%
Second round	33,314; 7.0%	20,410; 4.3%	21,051; 4.4%
- The first round results for the 2022 Czech Senate elections, by largest party per district.

Senate elections were held in the Czech Republic on 23 and 24 September 2022 alongside municipal elections. The election were won by the Spolu alliance consisting of the Civic Democratic Party (ODS), KDU-ČSL and TOP 09 which won 20 seats (including Tábor 2020 candidate Marek Slabý and ProMOST candidate Jan Paparega). The ODS was the most successful party, winning eight seats.

== Districts and incumbents ==
27 districts up for election
District	Incumbent senator	Party	Running	Result
1 – Karlovy Vary	Jan Horník	Mayors and Independents	Yes	4th place
4 – Most	Alena Dernerová	Union of Democrats - Association of Independents	Yes	lost in runoff
7 – Plzeň-město	Václav Chaloupek	Mayors and Independents	Yes	4th place
10 – Český Krumlov	Tomáš Jirsa	Civic Democratic Party	Yes	won
13 – Tábor	Jaroslav Větrovský	Independent	Yes	lost in runoff
16 – Beroun	Jiří Oberfalzer	Civic Democratic Party	Yes	won
19 – Prague 11	Ladislav Kos	Movement for Prague 11	Yes	lost in runoff
22 – Prague 10	Renata Chmelová	KDU-ČSL	Yes	won
25 – Prague 6	Jiří Růžička	TOP 09	Yes	won
28 – Mělník	Petr Holeček	Mayors and Independents	Yes	3rd place
31 – Ústí nad Labem	Jaroslav Doubrava	Severočeši.cz	No	—N/a
34 – Liberec	Michael Canov	Mayors for the Liberec Region	Yes	won
37 – Jičín	Tomáš Czernin	TOP 09	Yes	won
40 – Kutná Hora	Jaromír Strnad	Czech Social Democratic Party	Yes	lost in runoff
43 – Pardubice	Miluše Horská	KDU-ČSL	Yes	won
46 – Ústí nad Orlicí	Petr Šilar	KDU-ČSL	No	—N/a
49 – Blansko	Jaromíra Vítková	KDU-ČSL	Yes	won
52 – Jihlava	Miloš Vystrčil	Civic Democratic Party	Yes	won
55 – Brno-City	Jan Žaloudík	Czech Social Democratic Party	No	—N/a
58 – Brno-City	Jiří Dušek	Civic Democratic Party	Yes	won
61 – Olomouc	Lumír Kantor	KDU-ČSL	Yes	won
64 – Bruntál	Ladislav Václavec	ANO 2011	Yes	won
67 – Nový Jičín	Petr Orel	Green Party	Yes	3rd place
70 – Ostrava-City	Zdeněk Nytra	Civic Democratic Party	Yes	won
73 – Frýdek-Místek	Jiří Cieńciała	Independent	No	—N/a
76 – Kroměříž	Šárka Jelínková	KDU-ČSL	Yes	3rd place
79 – Hodonín	Anna Hubáčková	KDU-ČSL	No	—N/a

== Candidates ==
According to information from the Czech Statistical Office, 178 candidates (135 men and 43 women) applied candidacy. Compared to 2016 election, the number of candidates decreased by 55. The three youngest candidates seeking the senatorial seat are all 40 years old, the oldest candidate is 79 years old. The average age of the candidates is 56.63 years.

- In Senate district 1 – Karlovy Vary, Senate Vice-President Jan Horník is defending his seat, Karlovy Vary Region Governor Petr Kulhánek, who is also the son of former senator Vladimír Kulhánek, former deputy Věra Procházková and the mayor of Žlutice Václav Slavík are also running for the post of senator.
- In Senate district 4 – Most, the neurologist Alena Dernerová defends her mandate as a senator, other candidates include mayor of Most and the representative of the Ústí Region, Jan Paparega, or the former long-time member of the KSČM Hana Aulická Jírovcová, who is running as an independent candidate.
- In 7 – Plzeň-město, the candidates include senator and director Václav Chaloupek, jockey Josef Váňa, sports shooter Jan Kůrka, former Minister of Justice Daniela Kovářová or two former MPs Pavel Šrámek and Jiří Valenta.
- In Senate district 10 – Český Krumlov, senator Tomáš Jirsa, local politician Miroslav Lorenc or hospice director Robert Huneš are candidates.
- In Senate district 13 - Tábor, senator Jaroslav Větrovský is running for reelection. Other candidates include doctor Marek Slabý and mayor of Planá nad Lužnicí Jiří Šimánek.
- In 16 – Beroun, producer and deputy mayor of Karlštejn Janis Sidovský, lawyer Martin Karim or Senate vice-chairman Jiří Oberfalzer are candidates.
- In Senate district 19 – Prague 11, Senator Ladislav Kos is defending his mandate, his challengers include former Prime Minister Vladimír Špidla, politician Hana Kordová Marvanová, security expert David Bohbot or former Mayor of Prague Tomáš Hudeček.
- In Senate district 22 – Prague 10 candidates include the former mayor of Prague 10 Renata Chmelová, cardiac surgeon Jan Pirk and MP Jiří Kobza.
- In Senate district 25 – Prague 6, Senate Vice President Jiří Růžička is defending his mandate, against other candidates such as former deputy Dana Balcarová, 2018 presidential candidate Petr Hannig and manager Lenka Helena Koenigsmark.
- In Senate district 28 – Mělník, Senator Petr Holeček is defending his mandate, and other candidates include the manager of a non-profit organization Andrea Brzobohatá, the mayor of the village of Hlavenec Jarmila Smotlachová or the publicist Zdeněk Šarapatka.
- In Senate district 31 – Ústí nad Labem, the rector of the University of Jan Evangelista Purkyně in Ústí nad Labem Martin Balej, the director of the gymnasium Alfréd Dytrt, the mayor of Ústí nad Labem Petr Nedvědický and the former mayor of Ústí Věra Nechybová are among others running.
- In Senate district 34 – Liberec, Senator Michael Canov defends his mandate.
- In Senate district 37 – Jičín, senator Tomáš Czernin, ZOO Chleby director René Franěk, mayor of Železnice Dana Kracíková or former vice-chairman of the KSČM Václav Ort are candidates.
- In Senate district 40 – Kutná Hora, senator Jaromír Strnad is defending his mandate. Mayor of Vlašim Luděk Jeništa is running against him.
- In Senate district 43 – Pardubice, the candidates include senator Miluše Horská, mayor of Pardubice Martin Charvát and doctor Vladimír Ninger.
- In Senate district 46 – Ústí nad Orlicí, only technologist Stanislav Ešner and mayor of Letohrad Petr Fiala are seeking the post of senator.
- In Senate district 49 – Blansko, senator Jaromíra Vítková and the mayor of Kuřim Drago Sukalovský are candidates.
- In Senate district 52 – Jihlava, Senate President Miloš Vystrčil is defending the senator's mandate while other candidates include Agrofert employee Jana Nagyová, former representative of the Vysočina Region Josef Pavlík or lawyer Tomáš Nielsen.
- In Senate district 55 – Brno-City, the mayor of Železné Radomír Pavlíček, actor Tomáš Töpfer or mountaineer Pavel Trčala are running for the post of senator.
- Senator Jiří Dušek (now as a candidate of ODS) is defending his mandate in district Senate district 58 – Brno-City, other candidates are, for example, the former mayor of Brno Petr Vokřál, the architect of the city of Brno Michal Sedláček, the deputy mayor of the Brno-Židenice district Petr Kunc or former deputy Zdeněk Koudelka.
- In District Senate district 61 – Olomouc, candidates are Senator Lumír Kantor, MP Milan Brázdil, leader of Tricolour Citizens' Movement Zuzana Majerová and university teacher Michal Malacka.
- In Senate district 64 – Bruntál, the mandate of Senator Ladislav Václavec is being defended. Former Minister of Culture Antonín Staněk and Krnov representative Pavla Löwenthalová are also candidates for the Senate.
- In Senate district 67 – Nový Jičín, the ornithologist Petr Orel defends the senator's mandate, against him are, for example, former member of the KSČM Leo Luzar (now running as an independent candidate), general manager of Ostrava Leoš Janáček Airport Jaromír Radkovský and former member of parliament Dana Váhalová.
- Candidates in Senate district 70 – Ostrava-City include, Senator Zdeněk Nytra, former Senator Liana Janáčková, Chairman of the NEZ movement Patrik Hujdus or former Senator for District 48 – Rychnov nad Kněžnou Miroslav Antl.
- In Senate district 73 – Frýdek-Místek, manager Zdeněk Matušek, local politician Stanislav Folwarczny, former senator Petr Gawlas or former deputy Daniel Pawlas are among candidates.
- In Senate district 76 – Kroměříž, Senator Šárka Jelínková is defending her mandate. Her challengers include Holešov Mayor Rudolf Seifert, former MEP Olga Sehnalová and lawyer Jana Zwyrtek Hamplová.
- In Senate district 79 – Hodonín, candidates for the senatorial seat include, for example, the deputy mayor of Kyjov Antonín Kuchař, the mayor of Dambořice Zbyněk Pastyřík, the mayor of Dolní Bojanovice Eva Rajchmanová or the manager Ivo Vašíček.

Among the incumbent senators, Anna Hubáčková, Jiří Cieńciała, Jan Žaloudík, Petr Šilar and Jaroslav Doubrava did not run.

== Campaign ==
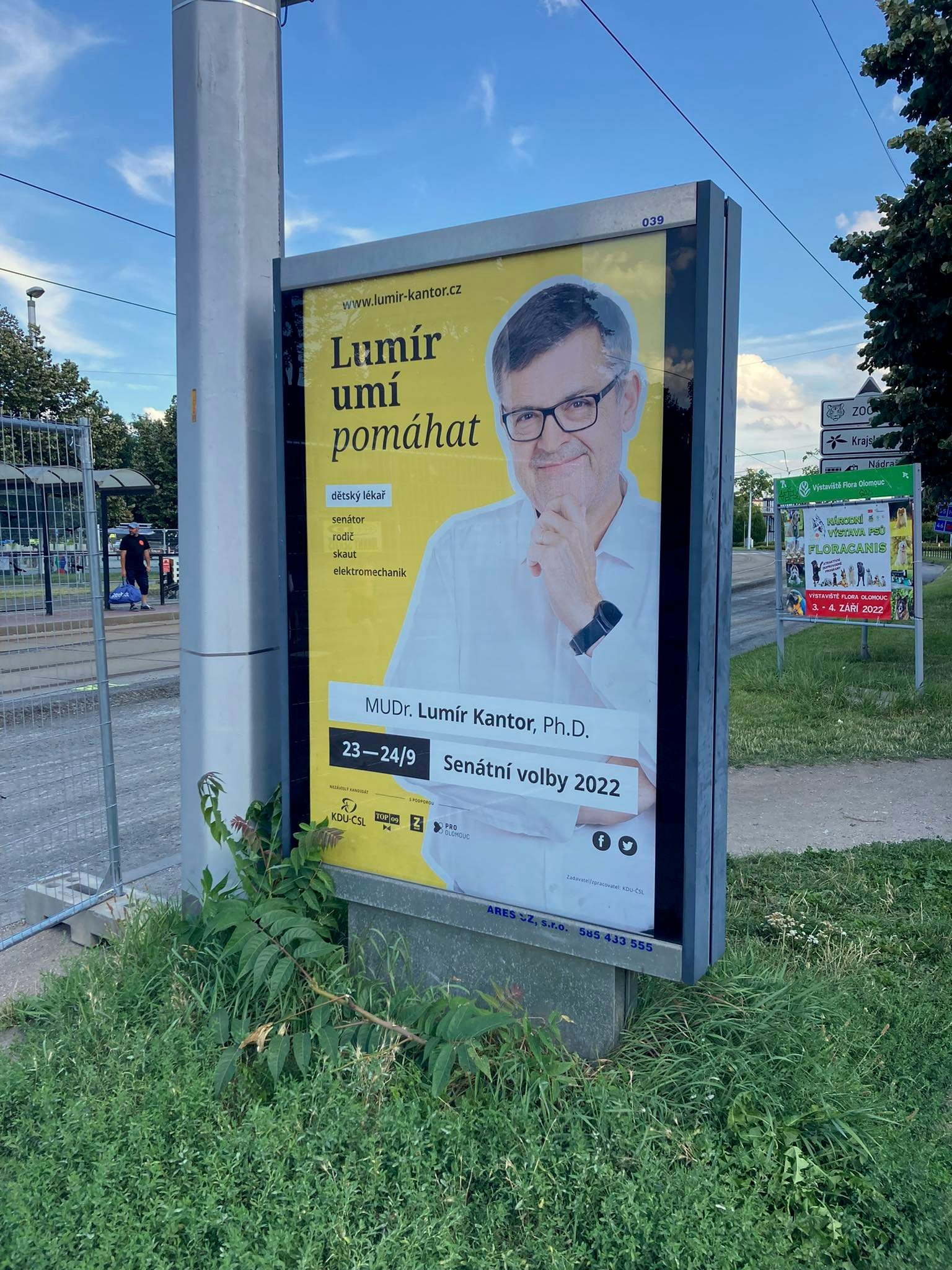
Campaign in Olomouc

KDU-ČSL introduced its candidates on 24 April 2022. Leader Marian Jurečka stated that party wants to win 7 seats at least. On 29 May 2022 Czech Pirate Party launched campaign with slogan "Bravery to do what is right" and introduced its candidates. Party nominated 7 candidates.

Parties that include Spolu (ODS, KDU-ČSL and TOP 09) decided to cooperate in the election nominating 19 common candidates with 6 nominated by ODS (including Senate president Miloš Vystrčil), 7 nominated by KDU-ČSL and 6 nominated by TOP 09. Candidates were introduced to public on 14 June 2022. Czech Prime Minister and leader of Spolu Petr Fiala stated that Spolu wants to retain democratic majority in senate. KDU-ČSL would nominate 11 senators overall. ODS nominated 13 candidates and TOP 09 7 candidates.

ANO 2011 launched campaign on 5 September 2022 with party leader Andrej Babiš appealed to voter to make the election a referendum about Petr Fiala's cabinet. Babiš decided to focus his personal campaign to help Jana Nagyová in Jihlava senate district against senate president Miloš Vystrčil believing that Vystčil's defeat would be a huge blow to governing coalition.

Czech Social Democratic Party launched campaign on 11 September 2022. It focused on energy prices, progressive taxation for companies and higher minimal wages.

First round was held on 23 and 24 September 2022. It was a big success for ANO 2011 which had 17 candidates advancing and one being elected in first round. Freedom and Direct Democracy had its candidate advancing to second round for the first time in its history. 3 candidates were elected in the first round including Jiří Růžička, Petr Fiala and Ladislav Václavec. Mayors and Independents suffered heavy losses in the first round with only one candidate advancing. Party lost some of its significant politicians such as Jan Horník, Petr Holeček or Václav Chaloupek who failed to advance for second round. ODS was second most successful party with 9 candidates advancing. KDU-ČSL had 6 candidates advancing and 1 being elected in first round. TOP 09 had 3 candidates advancing and 1 being elected. Overall SPOLU parties had 18 candidates advancing and 2 elected in first round.

ANO 2011 focused campaign for second round largely in Jihlava district. Party leadership went to the district to personally support Nagyová against Vystrčil whose defeat would weaken government coalition.

== Results ==
Party	First round			Second round			Seats		
Party	Votes	%	Seats	Votes	%	Seats	Won	Not up	Total
ANO 2011	244,516	21.98	1	149,331	31.12	2	3	2	5
Civic Democratic Party	151,908	13.65	0	111,071	23.15	8	8	15	23
KDU-ČSL	120,972	10.87	1	74,696	15.57	6	7	5	12
Freedom and Direct Democracy	85,855	7.72	0	2,791	0.58	0	0	0	0
Mayors and Independents	75,406	6.78	0	6,410	1.34	0	0	15	15
TOP 09	73,473	6.60	1	33,341	6.95	2	3	3	6
Czech Social Democratic Party	43,870	3.94	0	10,344	2.16	0	0	1	1
Independents	32,431	2.92	0	9,031	1.88	1	1	0	1
Czech Pirate Party	28,302	2.54	0				0	2	2
Senator 21	27,672	2.49	0	21,051	4.39	1	1	3	4
PRO 2022	27,048	2.43	0				0	0	0
Mayors for the Liberec Region	19,613	1.76	0	14,000	2.92	1	1	1	2
Communist Party of Bohemia and Moravia	17,612	1.58	0				0	0	0
Tricolour Citizens' Movement	14,832	1.33	0				0	0	0
Tábor 2020	14,186	1.28	0	10,676	2.23	1	1	0	1
Svobodní	11,730	1.05	0				0	1	1
South Bohemians 2020	10,718	0.96	0	9,289	1.94	0	0	0	0
Green Party	8,828	0.79	0				0	0	0
ProMOST	8,672	0.78	0	6,747	1.41	1	1	0	1
United Democrats – Association of Independents	8,608	0.77	0	4,729	0.99	0	0	0	0
Moravian Land Movement	6,556	0.59	0				0	0	0
Movement for Prague 11	6,524	0.59	0	5,569	1.16	0	0	0	0
For Plzen	4,683	0.42	0				0	0	0
For Health	4,276	0.38	0				0	0	0
Choice for the Region	4,226	0.38	0				0	0	0
Karlovy Vary Civic Alternative	3,972	0.36	0				0	0	0
Manifest.cz	3,319	0.30	0				0	0	0
Ústí Citizen's Forum	3,084	0.28	0				0	0	0
Safety, Responsibility, Solidarity	3,083	0.28	0				0	0	0
No Movement	2,822	0.25	0				0	0	0
For Sport and Healthy Milestone	2,768	0.25	0				0	0	0
Freeholder Party of the Czech Republic	2,617	0.24	0				0	0	0
Independent for Prague 10	1,984	0.18	0				0	0	0
Domov	1,811	0.16	0				0	0	0
Party of Common Sense	1,587	0.14	0				0	0	0
Czech National Socialist Party	1,478	0.13	0				0	0	0
Přísaha	1,471	0.13	0				0	0	0
PES Movement	1,187	0.11	0				0	0	0
Doma	1,040	0.09	0				0	0	0
Moravané	954	0.09	0				0	0	0
Heart for ...	693	0.06	0				0	0	0
State Party Direct Democracy – Labour Party	396	0.04	0				0	0	0
National Democracy	290	0.03	0				0	0	0
Democratic Party of Greens	269	0.02	0				0	0	0
Hradec Králové Democratic Club							–	1	1
Marek Hilšer for the Senate							–	1	1
Ostravak							–	1	1
Independents	25,177	2.26	0	10,707	2.23	1	1	3	4
Total	1,112,519	100.00	3	479,783	100.00	24	27	54	81
Valid votes	1,112,519	96.47		479,783	99.60				
Invalid/blank votes	40,670	3.53		1,947	0.40				
Total votes	1,153,189	100.00		481,730	100.00				
Registered voters/turnout	2,749,658	41.94		2,479,869	19.43				
Source: Volby

=== Elected senators ===
27 districts up for election
District	Senator	Party	Note
1 – Karlovy Vary	Věra Procházková	ANO 2011	
4 – Most	Jan Paparega	ProMOST	
7 – Plzeň-město	Daniela Kovářová	Ind.	
10 – Český Krumlov	Tomáš Jirsa	ODS	
13 – Tábor	Marek Slabý	T2020	
16 – Beroun	Jiří Oberfalzer	ODS	
19 – Prague 11	Hana Kordová Marvanová	ODS	
22 – Prague 10	Jan Pirk	TOP 09	
25 – Prague 6	Jiří Růžička	TOP 09	
28 – Mělník	Jarmila Smotlachová	ODS	
31 – Ústí nad Labem	Martin Krsek	SEN 21	
34 – Liberec	Michael Canov	SLK	
37 – Jičín	Tomáš Czernin	TOP 09	
40 – Kutná Hora	Bohuslav Procházka	KDU-ČSL	
43 – Pardubice	Miluše Horská	KDU-ČSL	
46 – Ústí nad Orlicí	Petr Fiala	KDU-ČSL	
49 – Blansko	Jaromíra Vítková	KDU-ČSL	
52 – Jihlava	Miloš Vystrčil	ODS	
55 – Brno-City	Tomáš Töpfer	ODS	
58 – Brno-City	Jiří Dušek	ODS	Originally elected for ANO 2011.
61 – Olomouc	Lumír Kantor	KDU-ČSL	
64 – Bruntál	Ladislav Václavec	ANO 2011	
67 – Nový Jičín	Ivana Váňová	KDU-ČSL	
70 – Ostrava-City	Zdeněk Nytra	ODS	
73 – Frýdek-Místek	Zdeněk Matušek	ANO 2011	
76 – Kroměříž	Jana Zwyrtek Hamplová	NEZ	
79 – Hodonín	Eva Rajchmanová	KDU-ČSL	

== Aftermath ==
Election was seen as a huge defeat for ANO 2011 as it won only in 3 districts despite strong showing in first round. It was also noted that Babiš' appeal to make the election a referendum about Petr Fiala's cabinet backfired on him as the governing coalition has won the election. ODS led by Prime Minister Petr Fiala won highest number of seats and won the election. KDU-ČSL was also successful. Mayors and Independents on the other hand suffered heavy losses as it lost 5 of its 6 seats up for election. Czech Social Democratic Party once major left wing party also saw continuation of its decline as it failed to win any seat and was left with only one last Senator after the election.

Jihlava district was most watched district as President of Senate Miloš Vystrčil was defending his seat there and leader of ANO 2011 Andrej Babiš strongly focused on the district. Despite Babiš' personal involvement Vystrčil received 60% against Nagyová's 40% and won by large margin. Notably turnout was much higher than in other districts.

Prime Minister Petr Fiala stated after election that the result is a success for Spolu. He stated that he is especially pleased with Jihlava district result which he considers personal defeat for Andrej Babiš. He stated that Vystrčil' victory in Jihlava was symbolic stating that Vystrčil face whole power of ANO 2011. Fiala also noted result of his own party ODS which won 8 seats twice more than in 2016. Andrej babiš admitted that the result was a disappointment and noted that some of his candidates lost narrowly. He stated that his party faced "after-November Cartel" in the election. Babiš also stated that despite defeat in Senate election his party won municipal election which was held along with first round.

=== Analysis ===
Several political scientists including Terezie Wasserbauerová or Jan Tvrdoň attributed defeat of ANO 2011 in second round to a bad strategy by party leadership which wanted to make the election a referendum about governing coalition and focused campaign in Jihlava district and not in districts where the race was expected to be close. Kamil Švec noted that ANO is losing Senate elections repeatedly in second round. Josef Kopecký stated that election reminded ANO that two round election doesn't help it which is a warning for 2023 Czech presidential election.
