= Vlastimil Sehnal =

Czech politician (1959–2025)

Vlastimil Sehnal (27 February 1959 in Brno – 14 October 2025) was a Czech politician who served as Senator. He died at the age of 66.
