= Independents (political party) =

Czech political party

Independents Nezávislí
- Abbreviation: NEZ
- Chairperson: Patrik Hujdus
- Founded: 8 September 1994
- Headquarters: Raisova 1066/6, 709 00 Ostrava – Mariánské Hory
- Chamber of Deputies: 0 / 200
- Senate: 1 / 81
- European Parliament: 0 / 21

Website
- nezavisli.cz

The Independents (Czech: Nezávislí) is a political party in the Czech Republic.

== History ==
The party was established on 8 September 1994 as the Association of Prague Independents, before adopting its current name in 1995. In the 1996 Chamber of Deputies and Senate elections it received 0.5% of the vote and failed to win a seat. Despite increasing its vote share to 0.9% in the Chamber of Deputies elections and 0.8% in the Senate elections of 1998, the party remained seatless. The 2000 Senate elections saw the party finish fifth, although with only 1.5% of the vote and no seats. However, in the 2002 Senate elections the party received 4% of the vote in the first round, and won two seats. They won two seats in the European Parliament in the 2004 elections, and another seat in the Senate elections later the same year.

After receiving just 0.6% of the vote in the 2006 Chamber of Deputies elections, the party's vote share fell to 0.5% in the 2006 Senate elections and it failed to win a seat. The party lost both its Senate seats won in 2002 in the 2008 elections and both its European Parliament seats in the 2009 elections.

The party failed to win a seat in subsequent Senate elections in 2010, 2014, 2016, 2018 and 2020. It regained parliamentary representation when it won a seat in the 2022 Senate elections, with Jana Zwyrtek Hamplová elected in Kroměříž.
