= 1998 Czech Senate election =

Election in the Czech Republic

Senate elections for a third of the chamber were held in the Czech Republic on 13 and 14 November 1998 with a second round on 20 and 21 November.

The result was a victory for the Four-Coalition, which won 13 of the 27 seats up for election. The Coalition was an alliance of the Christian and Democratic Union – Czechoslovak People's Party, the Democratic Union, the Freedom Union and the Civic Democratic Alliance. However, Civic Democratic Party remained the largest Senate fraction. Voter turnout was 41% in the first round and 20.3% in the second.

The elections were held using the two-round system, with an absolute majority required to be elected.

== Results ==
| Party | First round | | | Second round | | | Seats | | | |
| Party | Votes | % | Seats | Votes | % | Seats | Won | Not up | Total | +/– |
|---|---|---|---|---|---|---|---|---|---|---|
| Civic Democratic Party | 266,377 | 27.69 | 0 | 210,156 | 39.13 | 9 | 9 | 19 | 28 | –4 |
| Four-Coalition | 255,785 | 26.59 | 0 | 166,483 | 31.00 | 13 | 13 | 13 | 26 | +5 |
| Czech Social Democratic Party | 208,845 | 21.71 | 0 | 121,700 | 22.66 | 3 | 3 | 20 | 23 | –2 |
| Communist Party of Bohemia and Moravia | 159,123 | 16.54 | 0 | 31,097 | 5.79 | 2 | 2 | 2 | 4 | +2 |
| Green Party | 7,803 | 0.81 | 0 | | | | 0 | 0 | 0 | 0 |
| Independents | 7,415 | 0.77 | 0 | | | | 0 | 0 | 0 | 0 |
| Czech Right | 3,436 | 0.36 | 0 | | | | 0 | 0 | 0 | 0 |
| Moravians | 3,167 | 0.33 | 0 | | | | 0 | 0 | 0 | New |
| Party of Conservative Accord | 3,113 | 0.32 | 0 | | | | 0 | 0 | 0 | New |
| Democratic Regional Party | 2,585 | 0.27 | 0 | | | | 0 | 0 | 0 | New |
| Czech National Social Party | 2,302 | 0.24 | 0 | | | | 0 | 0 | 0 | 0 |
| Coexistence | 1,419 | 0.15 | 0 | | | | 0 | 0 | 0 | 0 |
| Democratic League | 992 | 0.10 | 0 | | | | 0 | 0 | 0 | New |
| Communist Party of Czechoslovakia | 716 | 0.07 | 0 | | | | 0 | 0 | 0 | New |
| Right Alternative | 452 | 0.05 | 0 | | | | 0 | 0 | 0 | 0 |
| Republican Union | 200 | 0.02 | 0 | | | | 0 | 0 | 0 | New |
| Independents | 38,381 | 3.99 | 0 | 7,655 | 1.43 | 0 | 0 | 0 | 0 | –1 |
| Total | 962,111 | 100.00 | 0 | 537,091 | 100.00 | 27 | 27 | 54 | 81 | 0 |
| Valid votes | 962,111 | 87.97 | | 537,091 | 99.12 | | | | | |
| Invalid/blank votes | 131,564 | 12.03 | | 4,778 | 0.88 | | | | | |
| Total votes | 1,093,675 | 100.00 | | 541,869 | 100.00 | | | | | |
| Registered voters/turnout | 2,666,398 | 41.02 | | 2,665,043 | 20.33 | | | | | |
Source: Nohlen & Stöver, Volby
