= Democratic Party of Greens =

Czech political party

Democratic Party of Greens – FOR ANIMAL RIGHTS Demokratická strana zelených – ZA PRÁVA ZVÍŘAT
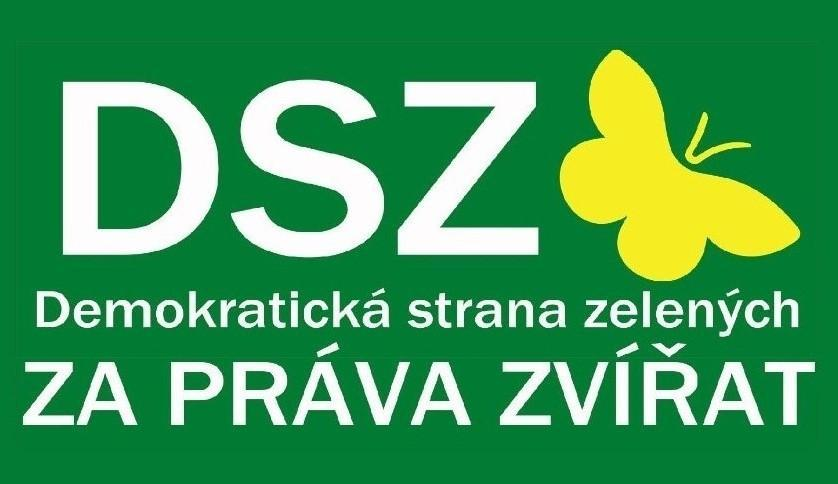
- Abbreviation: DSZ - ZA PRÁVA ZVÍŘAT
- Chairman: Jiří Anderle
- Deputy Leader: Jan Sladký
- Founder: Vladislav Koval; Daniel Solis; Jan Vondrouš; Olga Zubová
- Founded: 10 March 2009; 17 years ago
- Split from: Green Party
- Headquarters: Klenčí pod Čerchovem 64
- Ideology: Animal rights Formerly: Green politics; Anti-immigration
- Political position: Single-issue; Formerly: Left-wing
- Colours: Green Yellow
- Chamber of Deputies: 0 / 200
- European Parliament: 0 / 21

Website
- https://dsz-zapravazvirat.cz/

Democratic Party of Greens – FOR ANIMAL RIGHTS (Czech: Demokratická strana zelených – ZA PRÁVA ZVÍŘAT, DSZ - ZA PRÁVA ZVÍŘAT) is a political party in the Czech Republic. It was founded on 10 March 2009 as a split from the Green Party, led by two Green MPs, Olga Zubová and Věra Jakubková, who opposed the party's participation in the centre-right government of Mirek Topolánek. The current leader is Jiří Anderle, representative of Klenčí pod Čerchovem

== History ==
=== Democratic Appeal ===
Following the 2008 regional elections, Dana Kuchtová, the former minister of education, published an appeal addressed to the then-chairman of the Green Party, Martin Bursík, the party's executive committee, and the party members, in which she criticized the leadership at the time for the election defeat. On January 31, 2009, she published the Democratic Appeal (Czech: Demokratická výzva). The main goal of the appeal was the restoration of voters' confidence in the Green Party. The appeal also announced the formation of an internal party platform dedicated to rebuilding the party. More than 300 party members, including MPs Olga Zubová and Věra Jakubková, decided to support the appeal.

=== Formation of the party ===
The planned formation of the Democratic Party of Greens was announced by Jan Vondrouš the day after four politicians – Dana Kuchtová, Olga Zubová, Věra Jakubková, and Martin Čáslavka – were expelled from the Green Party. The party was founded on March 10, 2009. The MP Olga Zubová joined the newly formed party, thereby securing parliamentary representation, while Věra Jakubková became an honorary member. The first leadership consisted of the chairman Vladislav Koval, along with Jan Vondrouš, Olga Zubová, Jaromír Soukup, Luďka Tomešová and Jiří Šteg. The initiator of the appeal, Dana Kuchtová, did not join the new party and called on her former party colleagues to remain within the Green Party.

=== Early years ===
The party ran unsuccessfully in the 2009 European Parliament elections, in which it received 0.6% of the vote. The campaign was mostly financed by Jaromír Soukup. The party's lead candidate was Daniel Solis, but the most prominent faces of the campaign were Olga Zubová, along with Jaromír Soukup and sociologist Jan Keller. The party ran on a platform titled Vision of Democratic Europe.

The party approached the newly formed Czech Pirate Party before the European Parliament elections with an offer of cooperation for the upcoming Legislative election, but the Pirates rejected the offer. Ultimately, the Democratic Party of Greens received an offer to run on the ticket of the Czech Social Democratic Party. The party accepted this offer, and Olga Zubová was placed in the 5th position on the ČSSD's Prague ticket.

In the summer of 2009, the party participated in protests against the state high school-leaving exams. On July 16, a protest was held by the Green Revolution (GR) group, which was affiliated with the party. The primary organizer of the July protest was Markéta Zahradníková, who worked for Jaromír Soukup's media companies.

Following the decision not to call an early election, an anonymous member of the ČSSD announced that Olga Zubová would likely be removed from the ČSSD's Prague ticket due to a lackluster campaign performance. The then-chairman of the Prague ČSSD, Miroslav Poche, and the leader of the Prague list, Petr Hulínský, dismissed this as speculation and announced that the party would run with the same candidates as in the cancelled election, meaning that Olga Zubová would remain on the list. Despite this, Olga Zubová did not appear on the final ticket; this decision may have been influenced by the fact that Jaromír Soukup, who had financed the party campaign up to that point, decided to withdraw further financial support.

On October 6, 2009, Olga Zubová became the party's chairwoman. In January 2010, the party amended its bylaws, relocated its headquarters, and changed its name from Demokratická strana Zelených to Demokratická strana zelených. Since the party was no longer running in the legislative election it decided to focus on the autumn Senate and municipal elections. For the Senate elections the party fielded three candidates and ran on a platform titled Vision of a Europe of Peace and Democracy. In the municipal elections, the party invited anyone who did not hold racist or xenophobic views to run on its ticket, including members of other parties. Party founder Daniel Solis ran in Prague 1 as the leader of the Green Prague Residents (Czech: Zelená Praha Rezidenti) list (together with Party of Civic Rights – Zemanites) In Domažlice, Klenčí pod Čerchovem and Mrákov the party ran together with Sovereignty. In Ostrava, party founder Vladislav Koval ran as the leader of the DECLARATION OF COMMON INTERESTS (Czech: DEKLARACE SPOLEČNÝCH ZÁJMŮ) list.

=== Cooperation with Jana Bobošíková ===
In June 2011, Vojtěch Tomeš became the party's chairman. On July 4, 2011, former party chairwoman Olga Zubová was introduced at a press conference held by Sovereignty – Jana Bobošíková's Bloc as the newly elected chairwoman of the party's Central Bohemian regional organization. The two parties had already cooperated in the municipal elections in Domažlice and Klatovy districts. In early 2012, Olga Zubová declared that the Democratic Party of Greens had "folded" into Sovereignty; she cited the defense of Czech interests in the European Union and the rejection of foreign military missions as areas of ideological overlap. Party chairman Vojtěch Tomeš was also in favor of uniting the left, stating that he could envision cooperation even with the Communist Party of Bohemia and Moravia and that the Democratic Party of Greens was not pro-European at that time. In June 2012, Jiří Anderle became the party's chairman and he decided to continue cooperating with Jana Bobošíková. The party ran on Sovereignty – Party of Common Sense list in the 2012 regional election in the Plzeň Region, supported Jana Bobošíková in the 2013 Czech presidential election, ran within Jana Bobošíková's next electoral project, the Head Up – Electoral Bloc in the 2013 legislative election. In the 2014 European Parliament elections the party ran on the Czech Sovereignty list.

=== Anti-immigration stance ===
The party began to act independently again in September 2014. Daniel Solis, one of the party's founders of the party, spoke at a protest against the sanctions imposed on Russia following the Russian annexation of Crimea. In his speech, he criticized Martin Bursík, a petition called We are Distancing Ourselves (Czech: Distancujeme se) initiated by Michael Kocáb, and also TOP 09 for alleged protection and covering up of fascism. In the 2014 municipal elections the Democratic Party of Greens ran under its name in Plzeň Region where it received support of the Civic Conservative Party. In return, the party endorsed Civic Conservative Party for the Prague municipal elections, with the exception of Prague 2, where the party endorsed the Civic Democratic Party. The party's mayoral candidate in Plzeň was former police officer Zdeněk Kylián, whose previous conviction for the illegal use of pictures from police databases had been cleared by Václav Klaus's amnesty. The party's leader Jiří Anderle stated, that the party would support Kylián even if Zdeněk Kylián was not cleared.

On January 19, 2015, the party declared its support for Jana Černochová from the Civic Democratic Party, then-mayor of Prague 2, following her speech at an anti-Islam protest organized by Martin Konvička. On June 15, 2015, the party announced its support for initiatives by Civic Conservative Party, calling for a petition against migrant quotas, referendum on Czechia leaving the European Union, creation of the Movement for Strong Czech Republic in Europe of Free Nations, cooperation with the French National Rally and lifting of the sanctions imposed on Russia. On August 11, 2015, the party announced that they agree with the President Miloš Zeman's hardline stance against accepting any migrants from culturally distinct regions.

On May 17, 2016, the party launched the Vlast initiative, which opposed the European Union's and Angela Merkel's approach to the migration crisis. The initiative called for the unification of anti-immigration parties and movements into a single group with the working title HOMELAND (Czech: VLAST), which intended to contest the 2017 Legislative election. The initiative published a list of 75 groups it aimed to involve in the emerging project, 42 of which were active. Among the parties mentioned were, for example, the Freedom and Direct Democracy movement, the Workers' Party of Social Justice and Miroslav Sládek's Republicans.

On June 30, 2016 the party announced a joint list for the 2016 Regional elections with the parties Rozumní, Czech National Socialist Party and Czech National Social Party; the electoral name of this coalition was "NO TO ILLEGAL IMMIGRATION - MONEY BETTER SPENT ON OUR PEOPLE" (Czech: „NE ILEGÁLNÍ IMIGRACI - PENÍZE RADĚJI PRO NAŠE LIDI“). This slogan was intended to refer to the list's two main positions: the rejection of immigrants from the Middle East and the fight against the exploitation of the healthcare and social welfare systems. Within the list the Democratic Party of Greens presented itself as the only non-Marxist green party in the Czech Republic, comparing its vision of green politics to the Brontosaurs movement. For the Senate elections which took place at the same time the party decided to endorse ideologically close candidates, they endorsed 16 candidates in the first round and three candidates in the second round.

Following the 2016 Regional elections, in which the Freedom and Direct Democracy, running together with Party of Civic Rights, was the only anti-immigration party to win seats on the councils, lawyer Norbert Naxera, with the party's approval, issued a new call for unity ahead of the upcoming Legislative elections. In this appeal, the party expressed the need to secure sponsors and cited the Slovak People's Party Our Slovakia as an inspiration. The appeal further contained four points on which the parties on the joint list were to agree. Specifically, these were the approval of a law on a general referendum, a ban on accepting immigrants from non-European countries, withdrawal from the EU and NATO. On December 23, 2016, the party published a letter from the Homeland initiative announcing that Tomáš Ortel, frontman of the band Ortel, had taken over as the initiative's leader. On May 2, 2017 the party announced that it would run on the list of the Party of Common Sense and it supported their presidential candidate Petr Hannig in the 2018 presidential election. In the second round the party decided to endorse Miloš Zeman and it criticized his opponent Jiří Drahoš for skinning a rabbit during the campaign. On May 29, 2018, the party expressed support for the protests of the Decent People movement against the play Our Violence and Your Violence by Oliver Frljić.

=== Animal rights focus ===
On July 28, 2018, the party announced that it invites all animal rights groups to join its lists for the 2018 municipal elections and that it would allow these groups to pick a name for these lists. Following the success of this initiative the party decided to change its name on January 31, 2019 to Democratic Party of Greens – For Animal Rights (Czech: Demokratická strana zelených – ZA PRÁVA ZVÍŘAT) and on February 12, 2019, the party released a list of 12 new priorities focused exclusively on animal rights. Among these points there are stricters punishments for animal abuse, banning of puppy mills or banning experiments on animals.

On May 9, 2019, Andrea Bychlová, the party's leader for the 2019 European Parliament elections, shared her vision for the campaign. The main goal was to join the other European animal rights parties and establish a European Parliament group focused solely on animal rights. The party got approached by the Animal Politics Foundation, created by the Dutch Party for the Animals, regarding cooperation in the elections. In an interview with the Czech Television, Andrea Bychlová also stated that she supports policies to combat climate change, referendum on Czechia leaving the European Union, lifting of sanctions on Russia and is in favour of Ukraine and Turkey joining the EU.

For the 2020 Regional Elections the party managed to run alone in all 13 regions and it once again invited animal rights groups on its lists. The party also ran in the Senate elections and it endorsed candidates who promised to advocate for animal rights. The party's best result was in Plzeň Region, where it received 1.03% of the vote.

On May 20, 2021, the party announced that it will join other non-parliamentary parties in running in the 2021 Legislative election on the Alliance for the Future list. The party became the list's program guarantor in regards to animal and environment protection. The chairman of the Democratic Party of Greens Jiří Anderle said that one of the main reasons for joining this list was the 5% threshold, which he considers discriminatory towards smaller parties. The list failed to meet the 5% threshold. In the 2022 municipal elections the party once again invited animal rights groups to run on its lists and the party also ran one candidate in the Senate elections.

The party ran in the 2024 European Parliament elections with Hana Janišová as its lead candidate. The party once again solely focused on the issue of animal rights, stating that while the biggest priorities in general are migrants, the war in Ukraine and the adoption of Euro, which Hana Janišová is in favor of, the main goal of the party would be to enforce current EU legislation. In the student election the party managed to secure 4.55% of the vote, placing 8th just behind ANO 2011 and ahead of the Green Party. In the election, the party received 0.41% of the vote. In the 2024 Regional Elections the party ran alone in all 13 regions, the party's best result was in Plzeň Region, where it received 0.89% of the vote.

The party intended to run in the 2025 Legislative election. The party first approached the Communist Party of Bohemia and Moravia regarding a possible cooperation, since it considered to run on the Stačilo! list. The parties have not reached an agreement and on August 12, 2025, the party presented its candidates in the Plzeň Region, which was the only region in which the party intended to run. Subsequently, on September 10, 2025, the party announced its withdrawal from the election, stating that it would support a party with platform aligned with its priorities in the areas of animal rights. On September 22, 2025, the party announced its endorsement of ANO 2011 movement and called on its members, voters, supporters and animal rights activists to vote for vote this movement.

== Election results ==
=== Chamber of Deputies ===
Election	Votes		Seats
Election	List	%	Abs.
2013	Head Up – Electoral Bloc	0.42	0/200
2017	Party of Common Sense	0.72	0/200
2021	Alliance for the Future	0.21	0/200

=== Senate ===
==== 2010 Elections ====
DSZ Candidates
Senate District	Candidate	% of the vote
22 - Praha 10	Miroslav Suja	1.13 (#7)
25 - Praha 6	Daniel Solis	1.01 (#9)
40 - Kutná Hora	Olga Zubová	5.86 (#6)

==== 2016 Elections ====
Candidates Endorsed by DSZ
	First Round			Second Round		
Senate District	Candidate	Party	% of the vote	Candidate	Party	% of the vote
4 – Most	Jiří Maria Sieber	ŘN	5.59			
10 – Český Krumlov	Radim Hreha	APAČI 2017	1.63			
16 – Beroun	Petr Hampl	APAČI 2017	7.11	Jiří Oberfalzer	ODS	63.14
19 – Praha 11	Petr Hannig	Rozumní	2.34			
25 – Praha 6	Daniel Solis	SPR-RSČ Miroslava Sládka	1.11			
28 – Mělník	Pavel Matějka	SPR-RSČ Miroslava Sládka	0.42			
31 – Ústí nad Labem	Tomáš Vandas	DSSS	6.94			
34 – Liberec	Marek Vávra	ANO	15.38	Marek Vávra	ANO	19.81
37 – Jičín	Jiří Fiala	Rozumní	7.25			
52 – Jihlava	Patr Paul	SPD	7.21			
58 – Brno-město	Lucie Zajícová	ND	1.49			
61 – Olomouc	Eva Hrindová	APAČI 2017	2.45			
64 – Bruntál	Radoslav Štědroň	SSPD-SP	1.12			
70 – Ostrava-město	Alena Vitásková	Úsvit	12.16			
76 – Kroměříž	Daniela Hebranová	ODS	14.44			
79 – Hodonín	Anna Hubáčková	KDU-ČSL	28.30	Anna Hubáčková	KDU-ČSL	67.78

=== European Parliament ===
Election	List	Votes	%	Seats
2009	DSZ	14,761	0.62	0
2014	Czech Sovereignty	2,086	0.13	0
2019	DSZ - ZA PRÁVA ZVÍŘAT	14,339	0.60	0
2024	DSZ - ZA PRÁVA ZVÍŘAT	12,448	0.42	0

== Criticism surrounding the party ==
=== Vote splitting and influence of Jaromír Soukup ===
The party got criticized by Green MP Kateřina Jacques for vote splitting. She claimed that the party exists solely to damage the Green Party and that it was created by Jaromír Soukup, who, according to Kateřína Jacques, wanted to have a strong influence on the Green Party, when Martin Bursík stood up to him. She claims that following the 2009 European Parliament elections, where both parties failed to enter the European Parliament, Jaromír Soukup sent an SMS to Martin Bursík, which read "I really showed you" (Czech: To jsem ti to nandal). She claims that the MPs Olga Zubová and Věra Jakubková were not active and that is why Jaromír Soukup decided to influence them.

=== Czech Television regional debates ===
Before the 2020 Regional elections the Czech Television with help from KANTAR and Data Collect polling agencies conducted a poll measuring electoral potential in all 13 regions. The poll showed DSZ's potential between 3% and 6% and the party got invited to participate in three debates. This result seemed surprising and got criticized by Deník N and Parlametní listy because the party was not very well known and was not running full lists in all the regions and in some the party had only one candidate.

Similar situation happened before the 2024 Regional elections. The Czech Television tasked KANTAR and Data Collect polling agencies to conduct a poll measuring electoral potential in all 13 regions. The results of this poll were used to invite parties into the broadcast debates. The poll showed DSZ's electoral potential in all regions between 6% and 10% and the party got invited into the debate for Hradec Králové Region.
