= Senate district 25 – Prague 6 =

Electoral district in the Czech Republic

Coordinates: 50°05′19″N 14°18′58″E

25 – Prague 6
- inline Senate district of the Czech Republic

- The Prague-6 district on a map
- Senator: Jiří Růžička; TOP 09
- Region: Capital City of Prague
- District: Prague
- Electorate: 81,246
- Area: 35.33 km²
- Last election: 2022
- Next election: 2028

Senate district 25 – Prague 6 is an electoral district of the Senate of the Czech Republic, located in the Capital City of Prague. Since 2016, Jiří Růžička, a TOP 09 nominee, is Senator of the district.

== Senators ==
Year	Senator	Party
1996 (Note: Election for shortened two-year term)	Jan Koukal	ODS
1998	Jan Ruml	4KOALICE
2004	Karel Schwarzenberg	US-DEU
2010	Petr Bratský	ODS
2016	Jiří Růžička	TOP 09
2022	Jiří Růžička	TOP 09

== Election results ==
=== 1996 ===
1996 Czech Senate election in Prague 6
Candidate	Party	1st round	
Candidate	Party	Votes	%
Jan Koukal	ODS	25 701	54,13
Jaromír Císař	ČSSD	7 752	16,33
Alexander Tuček	KSČM	6 225	13,11
Josef Fořtl	ODA	4 049	8,53
Helena Frankenbergerová	KAN	1 971	4,15
Ivan Martinovský	SZ	693	1,46
Aleš Moravec	PB	661	1,39
Zdeněk Škoda	SDP	431	0,91

=== 1998 ===
1998 Czech Senate election in Prague 6
Candidate	Party	1st round		2nd round	
Candidate	Party	Votes	%	Votes	%
Jan Ruml	4KOALICE	18 367	40,67	20 059	65,56
Jan Koukal	ODS	11 065	24,50	10 536	34,44
Zdeněk Trojan	ČSSD	7 552	16,72	—	—
Alexander Tuček	KSČM	5 216	11,55	—	—
Karel Kříž	NEZ	2 960	6,55	—	—

=== 2004 ===
2004 Czech Senate election in Prague 6
Candidate	Party	1st round		2nd round	
Candidate	Party	Votes	%	Votes	%
Karel Schwarzenberg	US-DEU, ODA	10 547	33,20	15 088	58,16
Marie Kousalíková	ODS	10 495	33,04	10 854	41,83
Václav Exner	KSČM	4 691	14,76	—	—
Jan Kačer	KDU-ČSL	3 455	10,87	—	—
Jindřich Tomáš	ČSSD	1 914	6,02	—	—
Zdislav Růžička	SZR	447	1,40	—	—
Jiří Stanislav	NEZ	214	0,67	—	—

=== 2010 ===
2010 Czech Senate election in Prague 6
Candidate	Party	1st round		2nd round	
Candidate	Party	Votes	%	Votes	%
Petr Bratský	ODS	11 574	29,86	10 851	50,16
Bedřich Moldan	TOP 09, STAN	9 761	23,50	10 781	49,83
Jan Kohout	ČSSD	7 970	19,19	—	—
Lucie Ramnebornová	Independent	4 039	9,72	—	—
Helena Briardová	KSČM	2 936	7,06	—	—
Martin Stránský	VV	2 342	5,63	—	—
Marián Hošek	KDU-ČSL	1 521	3,66	—	—
Tomáš Finger	SPOZ, Sovereignty	774	1,86	—	—
Daniel Solis	DSZ	422	1,01	—	—
Ivan Šterzl	ČSNS 2005	190	0,45	—	—

=== 2016 ===
2016 Czech Senate election in Prague 6
Candidate	Party	1st round		2nd round	
Candidate	Party	Votes	%	Votes	%
Jiří Růžička	TOP 09, STAN	12 213	42,31	13 631	72,06
Václav Bělohradský	ČSSD, SZ	4 828	16,72	5 284	27,93
František Stárek	ODS	3 957	13,71	—	—
Vlastimil Harapes	ANO 2011	3 840	13,30	—	—
Pavel Franěk	KSČM	1 728	5,98	—	—
Jaroslav Dvořák	SPO	877	3,03	—	—
Martin Šalek	ŘN	482	1,67	—	—
Bedřich Danda	SsČR	341	1,18	—	—
Daniel Solis	SPR-RSČ of Miroslav Sládek	321	1,11	—	—
Aleš Hušák	NEZ	274	0,94	—	—

=== 2022 ===
2022 Czech Senate election in Prague 6
Candidate	Party	1st round	
Candidate	Party	Votes	%
Jiří Růžička	TOP 09, KDU-ČSL, ODS, STAN	18 301	50,28
Dana Balcarová	Pirates	5 451	14,97
Petr Pavlík	ČSSD	3 559	9,77
Petr Vacek	PRO 2022	3 482	9,56
Lenka Helena Koenigsmark	SEN 21	2 911	7,99
Petr Hannig	Rozumní	1 153	3,16
Jiří Pavel Pešek	Manifest.cz	1 029	2,82
Jaroslav Dvořák	ČSNS	510	1,40
