= Senate district 4 – Most =

Electoral district in the Czech Republic

Coordinates: 50°33′32″N 13°34′41″E

4 – Most
- inline Senate district of the Czech Republic

- The Most district on a map
- Senator: Jan Paparega; ProMOST
- Region: Ústí nad Labem
- District: Most
- Electorate: 86904
- Area: 467.16 km²
- Last election: 2022
- Next election: 2028

Senate district 4 – Most is an electoral district of the Senate of the Czech Republic, located around the city of Most and consisting of the whole of Most District. From 2022, Jan Paparega of ProMOST is representing the district, caucusing with the ODS and TOP 09 Senate group.

== Senators ==
Year	Senator	Party
1996 (Note: Election for shortened two-year term)	Richard Falbr	Independent
1998	Richard Falbr	ČSSD
2004	Vlastimil Balín	KSČM
2010	Alena Dernerová	S.cz
~~2016~~ (Note: Election canceled by the Supreme Administrative Court)	~~Alena Dernerová~~	S.cz
2017 (Note: Re-run of the 2016 election)	Alena Dernerová	SD-SN
2022	Jan Paparega	ProMOST

== Elections ==
=== 1996 ===
1996 Czech Senate election in Most (Note: As this was the first ever election to the Senate of the Czech Republic, Senator was elected only for two-year term.)
Candidate	Party	1st round		2nd round	
Candidate	Party	Votes	%	Votes	%
Richard Falbr	Independent	6 245	26,34	11 993	53,23
Milan Konečný	ODS	9 367	39,51	10 538	46,77
Jan Vagaši	KSČM	5 168	21,80	—	—
Petr Pakosta	ČSNS	1 509	6,37	—	—
Kamila Moučková	ODA	727	3,07	—	—
Vojtěch Krejčíř	KDU-ČSL	690	2,91	—	—
Independent win (new seat)					

=== 1998 ===
1998 Czech Senate election in Most
Candidate	Party	1st round		2nd round	
Candidate	Party	Votes	%	Votes	%
Richard Falbr	ČSSD	11 609	41,55	9 584	55,59
Pavel Weiss	Independent	5 676	22,32	7 655	44,41
Jiří Pešek	ODS	5 552	19,87	—	—
Vlastimil Balín	KSČM	4 856	17,38	—	—
Andrej Olejník	Right Alternative	246	0,88	—	—
ČSSD gain from Independent					

=== 2004 ===
2004 Czech Senate election in Most
Candidate	Party	1st round		2nd round	
Candidate	Party	Votes	%	Votes	%
Vlastimil Balín	KSČM	5 236	27,01	7 894	52,42
Hana Jeníčková	ODS	4 608	23,84	7 163	47,57
Petr Červenka	ČSSD	3 828	19,81	—	—
Pavel Weiss	KDU-ČSL	2 625	13,58	—	—
Karel Zdražil	SNK ED	1 444	7,47	—	—
Tomáš Matějovský	NEZ	1 153	5,96	—	—
Olga Procházková	Rozumní	429	2,22	—	—
KSČM gain from ČSSD					

=== 2010 ===
2010 Czech Senate election in Most
Candidate	Party	1st round		2nd round	
Candidate	Party	Votes	%	Votes	%
Alena Dernerová	S.cz	12 671	37,29	11 677	65,14
Zdeněk Brabec	ČSSD	6 039	17,77	6 247	34,85
Josef Nétek	KSČM	4 012	11,80	—	—
Václav Hofmann	ODS	3 921	11,54	—	—
Saša Štembera	TOP 09	2 674	7,87	—	—
Vlastimil Doležal	VV	1 846	5,43	—	—
Tomáš Vandas	DSSS	1 744	5,13	—	—
Vlastimil Balín	OMMO	1 069	3,14	—	—
S.cz gain from KSČM					

=== 2016 ===
The 2016 election was declared invalid by the Supreme Administrative Court of the Czech Republic (NSS) after it was found that the deputy leader of Severočeši.cz retracted Alena Dernerová's candidacy a week before the election, however the city administration of Most, which was overseeing the election, did not accept the retraction. NSS found this illegal and ordered an electoral re-run in 2017.

2016 Czech Senate election in Most (annulled)
Candidate	Party	1st round		2nd round	
Candidate	Party	Votes	%	Votes	%
Alena Dernerová	S.cz	8 134	36,66	6 844	70,81
Jiří Šlégr	ČSSD	3 644	16,42	2 821	29,18
Jiří Biolek	STAN	3 465	15,61	—	—
Josef Nétek	KSČM	2 542	11,45	—	—
Libuše Hrdinová	ODS	1 820	8,20	—	—
Oto Zaremba	DSSS (Note: In a coalition with NÁR.SOC., NF, ČÚNL)	1 339	6,03	—	—
Jiří Maria Sieber	SKP – ŘN	1 241	5,59	—	—
S.cz hold (later annulled)					

=== 2017 (re-run) ===
Re-run of the annulled 2016 election. Alena Dernerová chose to run under United Democrats – Association of Independents label after she was ousted from Severočeši.cz the year before, and was reelected in the first round after gaining over 50% of the vote.

2017 Czech Senate repeated election in Most
Candidate	Party	1st round	
Candidate	Party	Votes	%
Alena Dernerová	SD-SN	5 933	54,90
Jiří Šlégr	ČSSD	1 700	15,73
Josef Nétek	KSČM	797	7,37
Roman Ziegler	ANO	723	6,69
Jiří Biolek	STAN	639	5,91
Libuše Hrdinová	ODS	444	4,10
Jiří Maria Sieber	SKP – ŘN	246	2,27
Zbyněk Vodák	TOP 09	195	1,80
Jiří Fiala	Rozumní	128	1,18
SD-SN gain from S.cz			

=== 2022 ===
Candidate	Party	1st round		2nd round	
Candidate	Party	Votes	%	Votes	%
Jan Paparega	ProMOST (Note: Supported by ODS, TOP 09 and KDU-ČSL)	8 672	31,59	6 747	58,79
Alena Dernerová	SD-SN	8 608	31,36	4 729	41,20
Ivana Turková	SPD	6 547	23,85	—	—
Hana Aulická Jírovcová	Independent	3 331	12,13	—	—
Michal Moravec	ND	290	1,05	—	—
ProMOST gain from SD-SN					
