= Vlastimil Balín =

Czech politician and senator

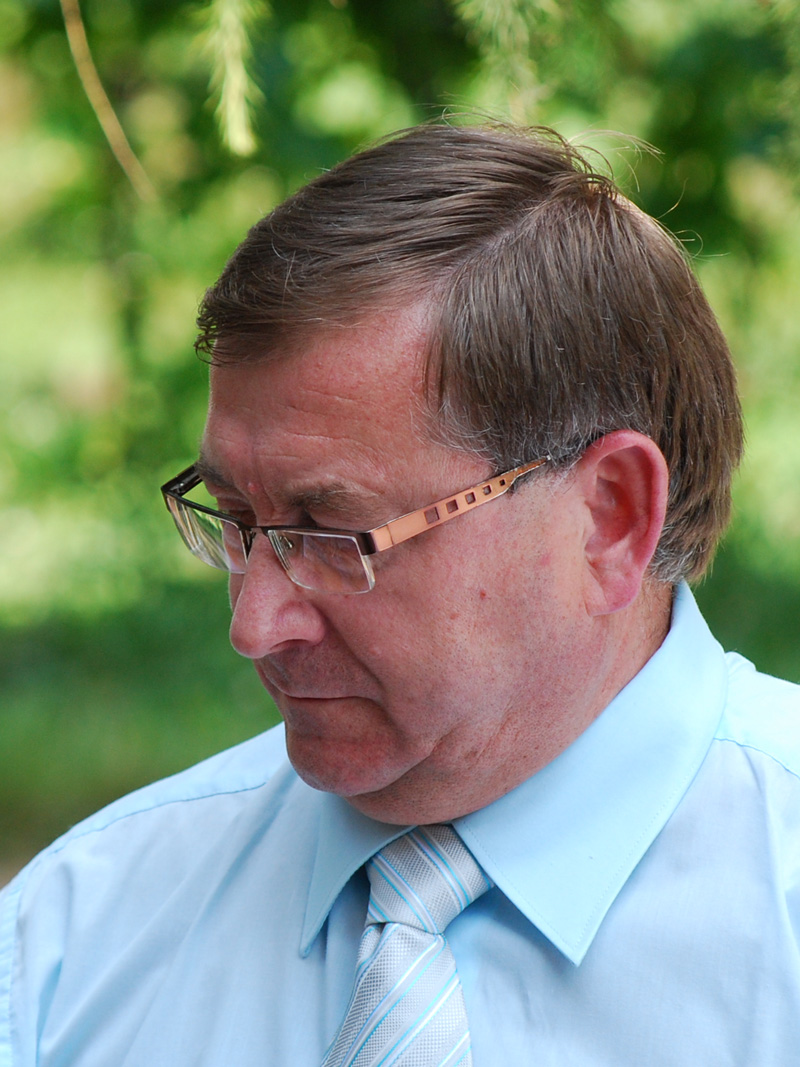

Senator for Most
- In office 13 November 2004 – 13 November 2010
- Preceded by: Richard Falbr
- Succeeded by: Alena Dernerová

Personal details
- Born: 23 October 1950 (age 75) Most, Czechoslovakia
- Party: Communist Party of Bohemia and Moravia (until 2010)
- Occupation: politician
- Website: balin.cz

Vlastimil Balín (born 23 October 1950) is a Czech politician who served as Senator for Senate district 4 – Most from 2004 to 2010. He was a member of the Communist Party of Bohemia and Moravia.
