= 2004 Czech Senate election =

- 5 and 6 November 2004 (first round); 12 and 13 November 2004 (second round)
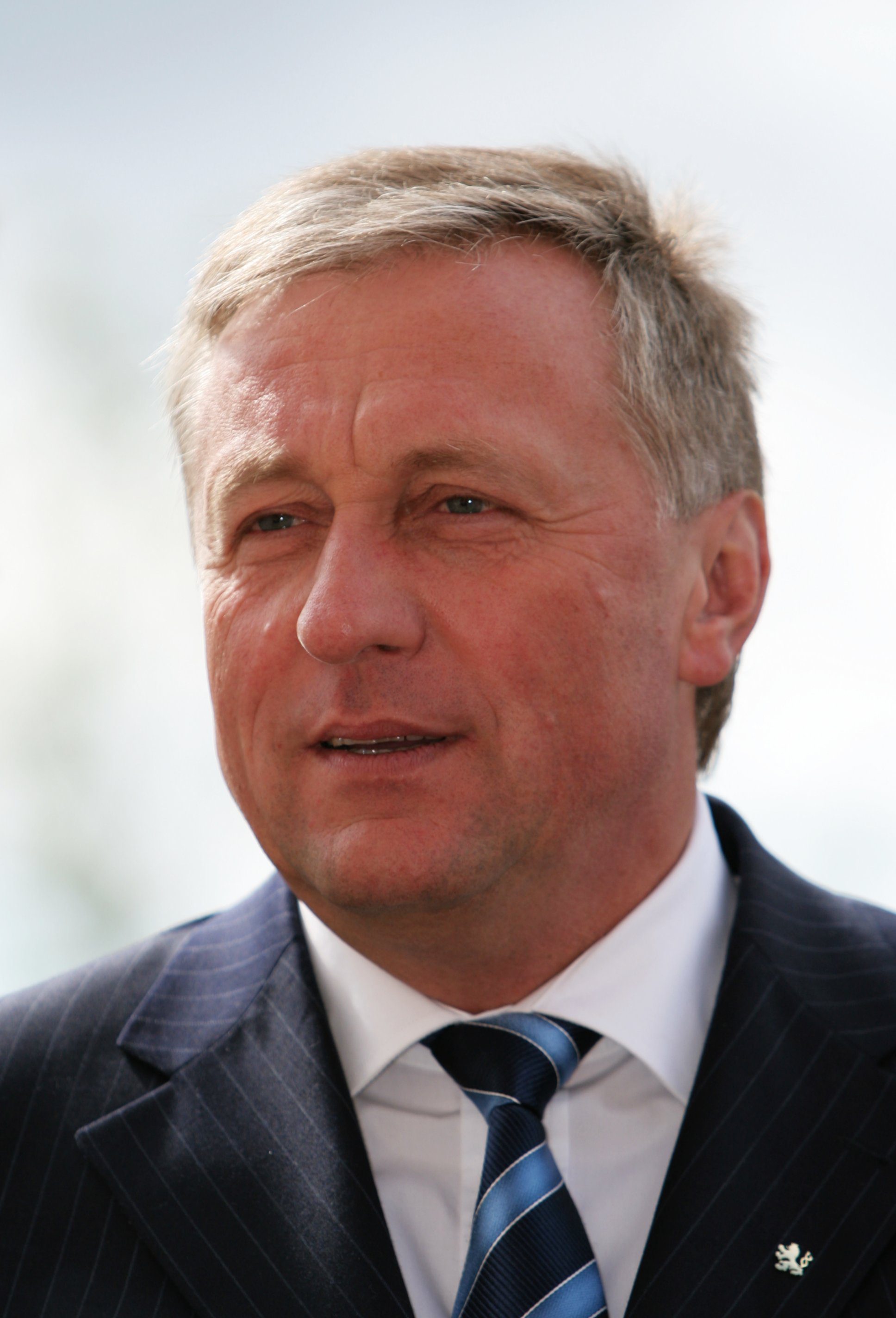

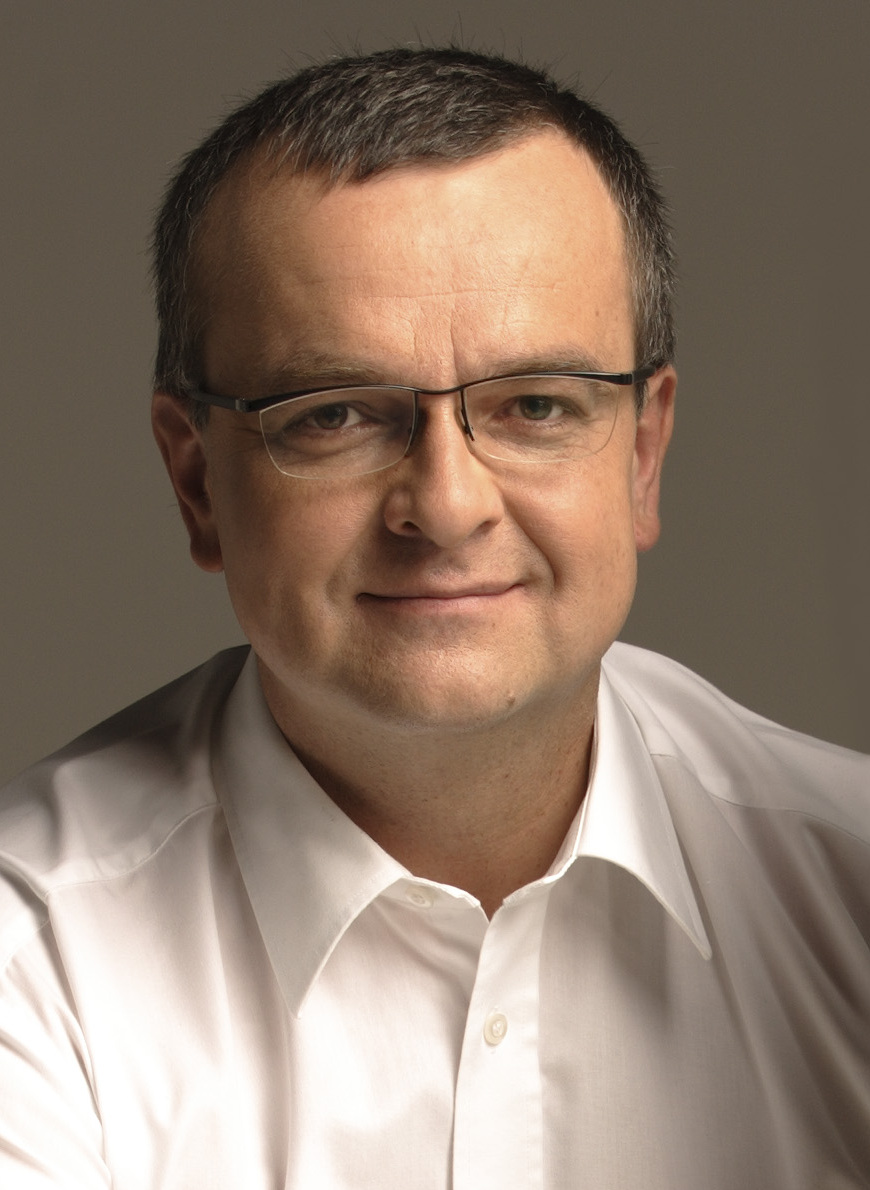

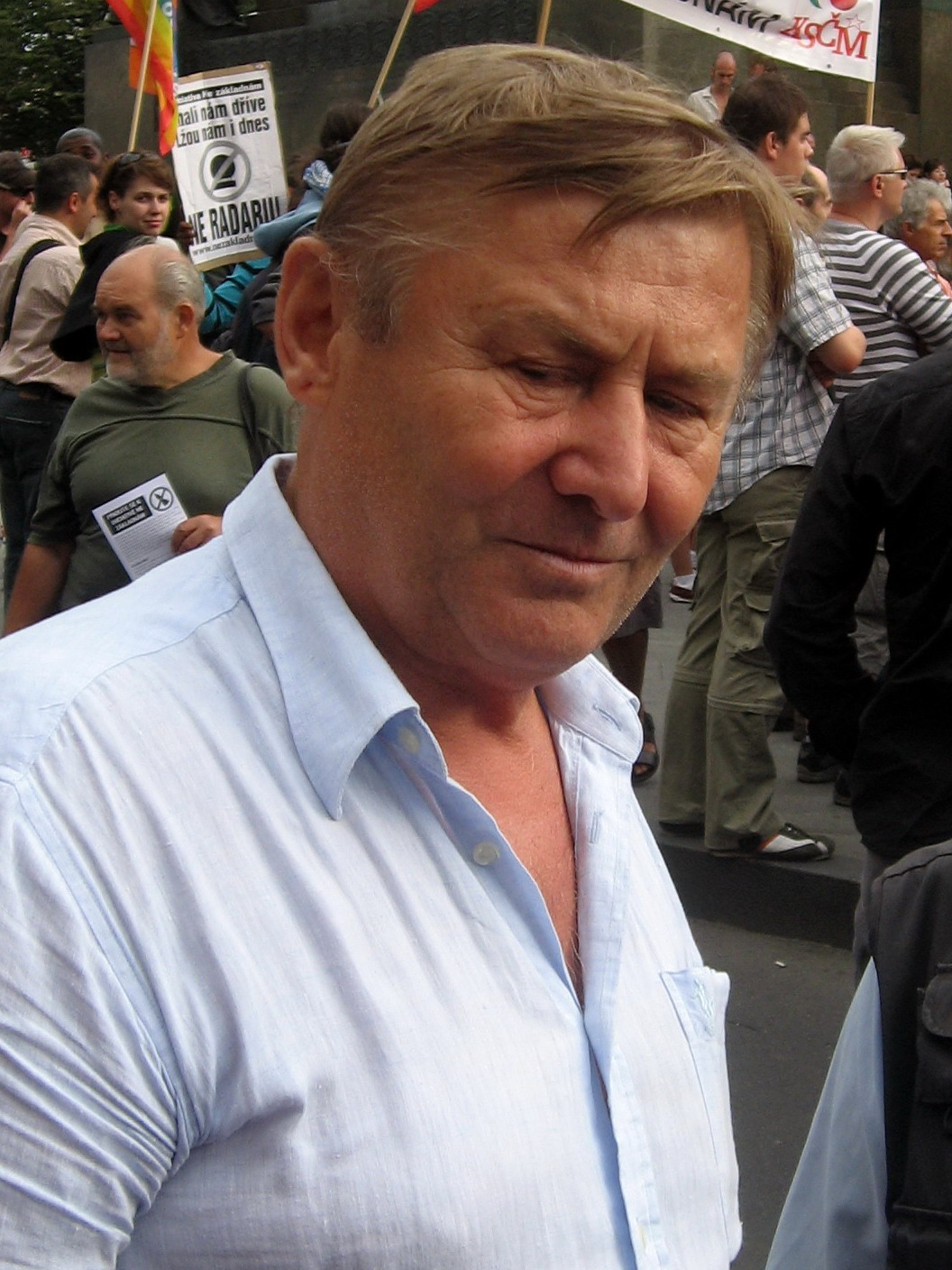
| | First party | Second party | Third party |
|---|---|---|---|
| Leader | Mirek Topolánek | Miroslav Kalousek | Miroslav Grebeníček |
| Party | ODS | Christian and Democratic Union – Czechoslovak People's Party | KSČM |
| Seats won | 19 | 4 | 1 |
| First round | 241,120; 33.27% | 97,956; 13.52% | 125,892; 17.37% |
| Second round | 257,861; 53.85% | 54,501; 11.38% | 65,136; 13.60% |

Senate elections were held in the Czech Republic on 5 and 6 November 2004, with a second round on 12 and 13 November. The result was a victory for the Civic Democratic Party, which won 37 of the 81 seats. Voter turnout was 28.6% in the first round and just 18.4% in the second.

== Results ==
| Nominating party | First round | | | Second round | | | Total seats |
| Nominating party | Votes | % | Seats | Votes | % | Seats | Total seats |
|---|---|---|---|---|---|---|---|
| Civic Democratic Party | 241,120 | 33.27 | 1 | 257,861 | 53.85 | 17 | 18 |
| Communist Party of Bohemia and Moravia | 125,892 | 17.37 | 0 | 65,136 | 13.60 | 1 | 1 |
| KDU-ČSL | 97,956 | 13.52 | 0 | 54,501 | 11.38 | 3 | 3 |
| Czech Social Democratic Party | 90,446 | 12.48 | 0 | 24,923 | 5.20 | 0 | 0 |
| Independents | 35,900 | 4.95 | 0 | 7,337 | 1.53 | 1 | 1 |
| Freedom Union – Democratic Union | 26,431 | 3.65 | 0 | 23,922 | 5.00 | 1 | 1 |
| SNK–ED | 20,503 | 2.83 | 0 | 16,067 | 3.36 | 1 | 1 |
| United Democrats – Association of Independents | 17,433 | 2.41 | 0 | 8,244 | 1.72 | 1 | 1 |
| Non-Partisans for Moravia | 7,838 | 1.08 | 0 | | | | 0 |
| Green Party | 7,137 | 0.98 | 0 | 13,296 | 2.78 | 1 | 1 |
| Liberal Reform Party | 6,815 | 0.94 | 0 | | | | 0 |
| Party of Common Sense | 5,804 | 0.80 | 0 | | | | 0 |
| Voter Self-Defence – Your Vote for Healthcare | 4,299 | 0.59 | 0 | 7,604 | 1.59 | 0 | 0 |
| Path of Change | 3,586 | 0.49 | 0 | | | | 0 |
| Free Civic Self-Government | 2,682 | 0.37 | 0 | | | | 0 |
| State Party Direct Democracy – Labour Party | 2,031 | 0.28 | 0 | | | | 0 |
| Mayors for the Region | 1,491 | 0.21 | 0 | | | | 0 |
| Koruna Česká | 1,190 | 0.16 | 0 | | | | 0 |
| Hope | 886 | 0.12 | 0 | | | | 0 |
| Right Bloc | 881 | 0.12 | 0 | | | | 0 |
| Party for Life Security | 832 | 0.11 | 0 | | | | 0 |
| Civic Democratic Alliance | 538 | 0.07 | 0 | | | | 0 |
| Fair Play – HNPD | 494 | 0.07 | 0 | | | | 0 |
| Balbín's Poetic Party | 429 | 0.06 | 0 | | | | 0 |
| Conservative and Social Movements | 335 | 0.05 | 0 | | | | 0 |
| Conservative Party | 309 | 0.04 | 0 | | | | 0 |
| Moravané | 285 | 0.04 | 0 | | | | 0 |
| National Party | 274 | 0.04 | 0 | | | | 0 |
| HNHRM | 142 | 0.02 | 0 | | | | 0 |
| Moravian Democratic Party | 141 | 0.02 | 0 | | | | 0 |
| Conservative Alternative | 44 | 0.01 | 0 | | | | 0 |
| Independents | 20,542 | 2.83 | 0 | | | | 0 |
| Total | 724,686 | 100.00 | 1 | 478,891 | 100.00 | 26 | 27 |
| Valid votes | 724,686 | 93.22 | | 478,891 | 99.52 | | |
| Invalid/blank votes | 52,731 | 6.78 | | 2,300 | 0.48 | | |
| Total votes | 777,417 | 100.00 | | 481,191 | 100.00 | | |
| Registered voters/turnout | 2,715,437 | 28.63 | | 2,614,630 | 18.40 | | |
Source: Nohlen & Stöver, Volby
