= 2016 Czech Senate election =

- 7–8 October 2016 (first round); 14–15 October 2016 (second round); 27–28 January 2017 (Most)
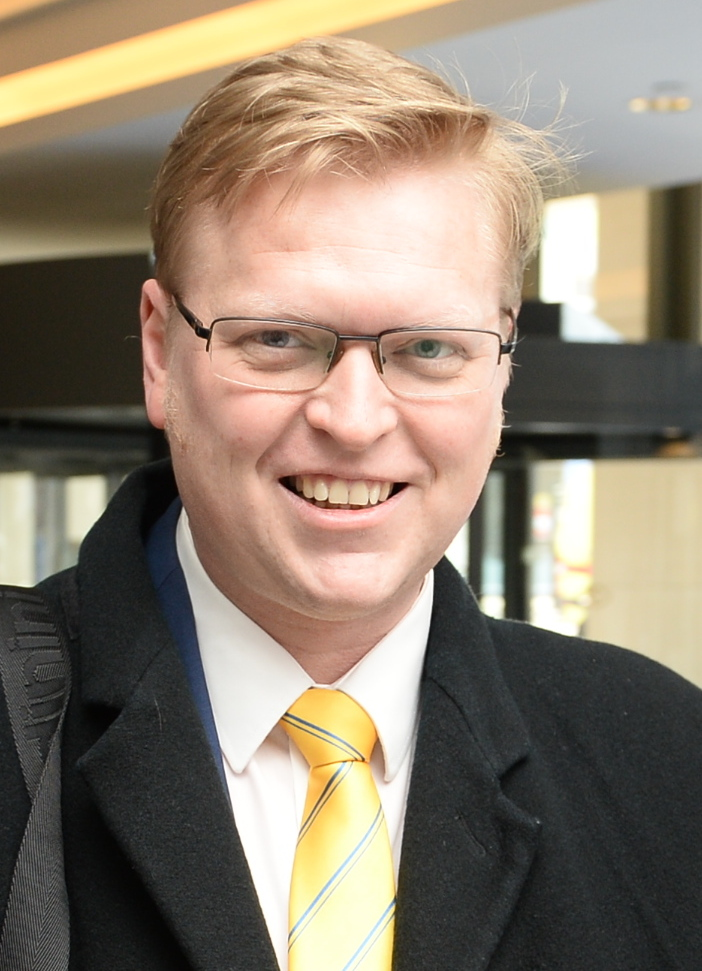

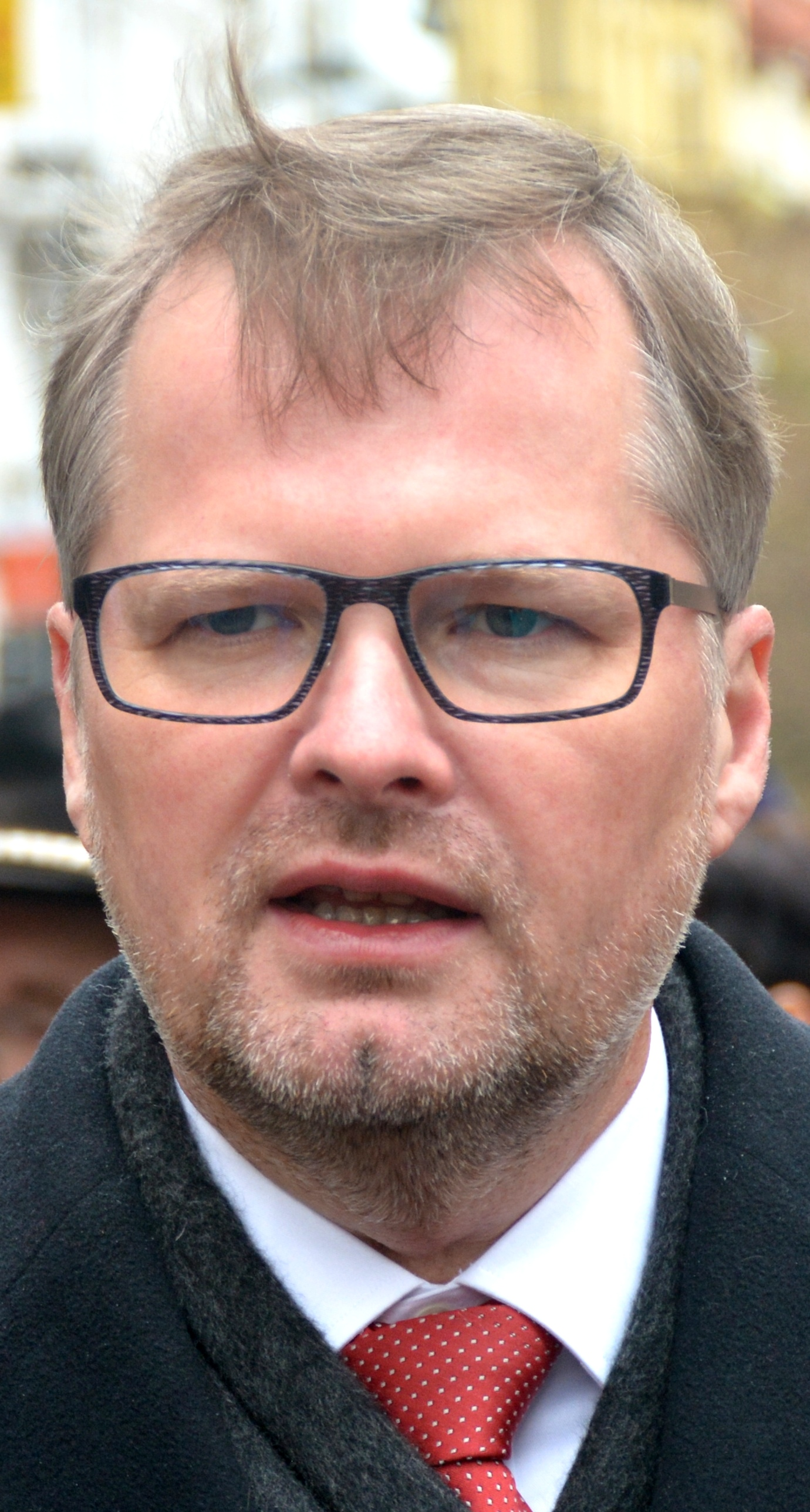

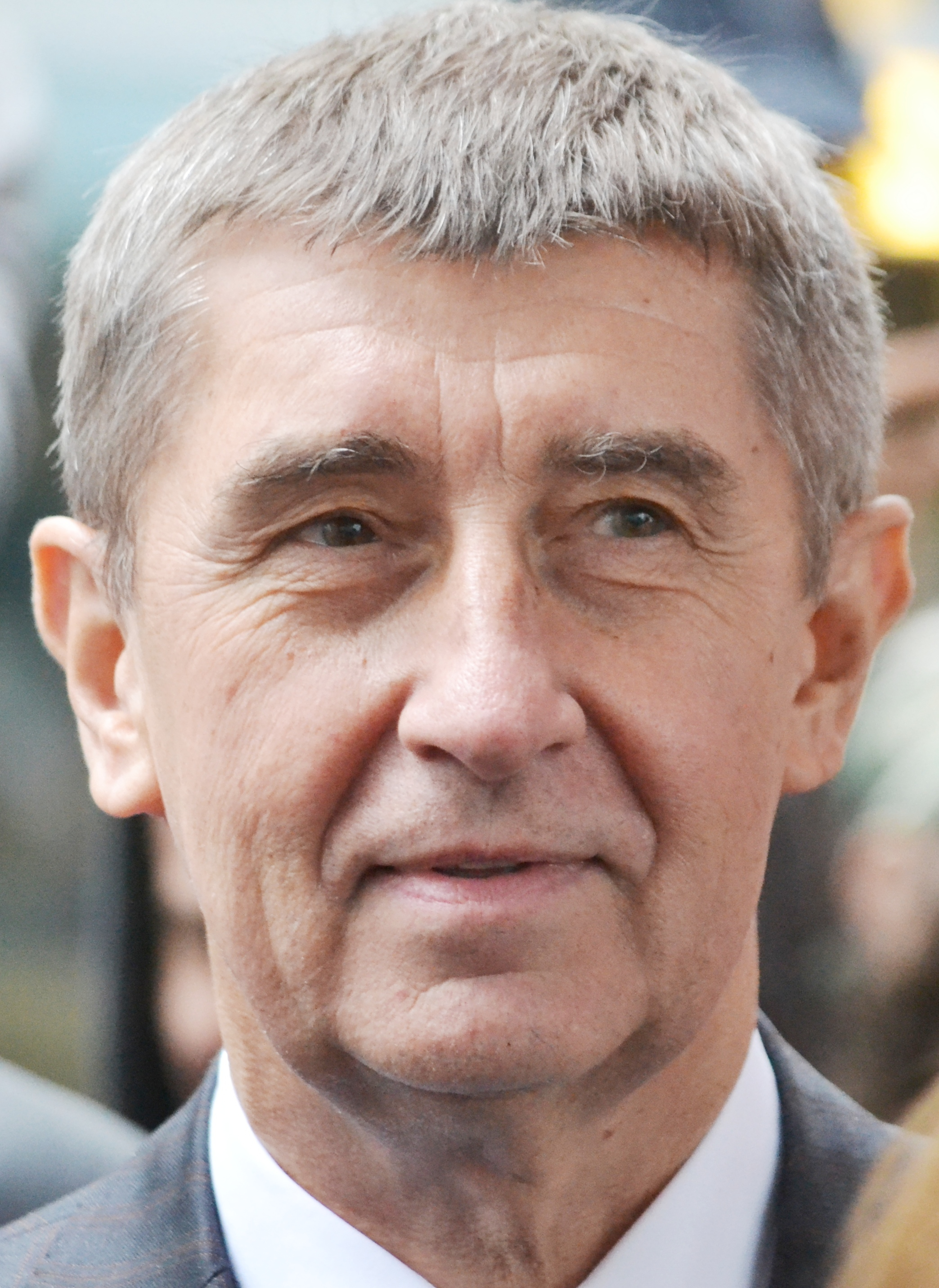

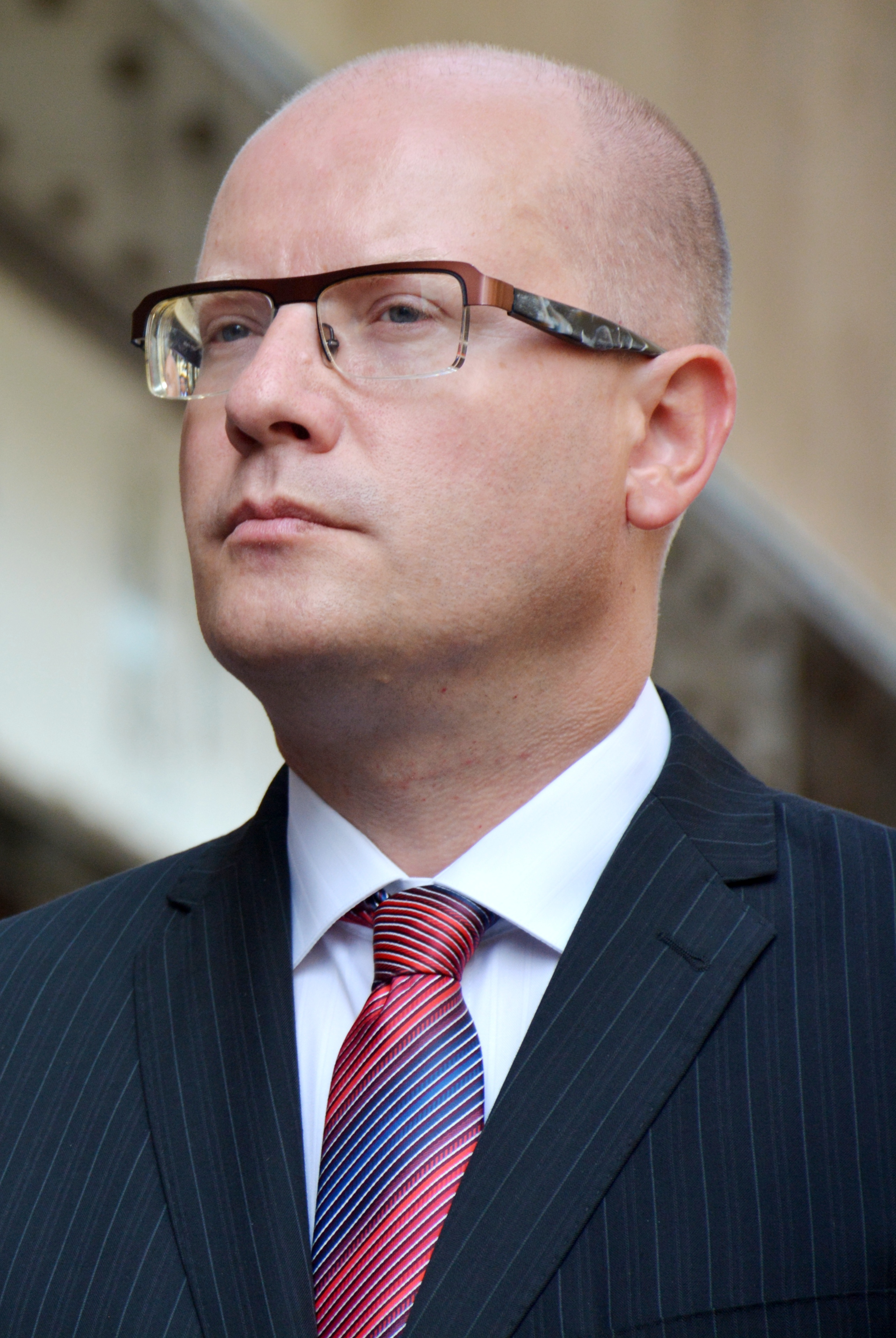

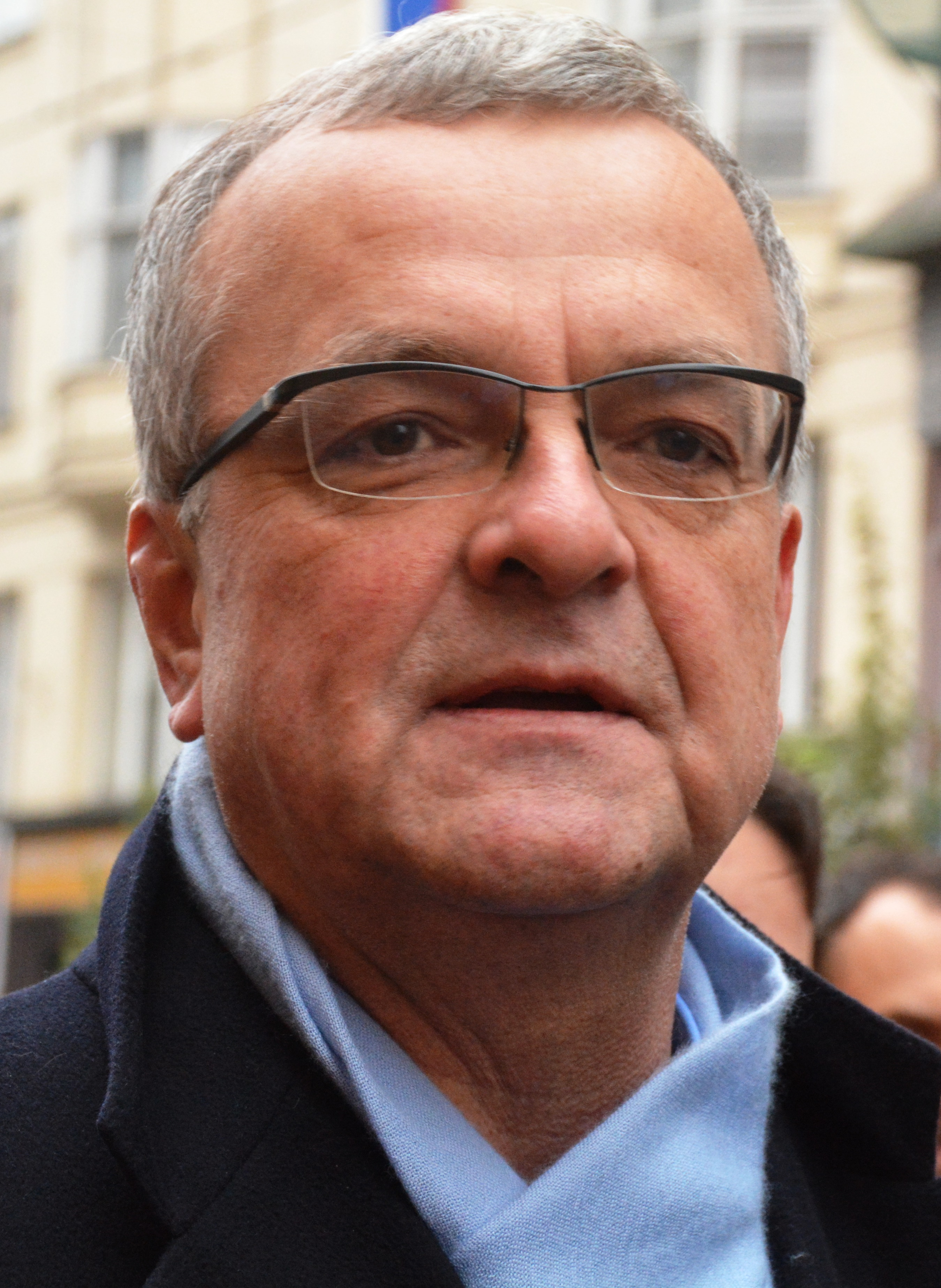

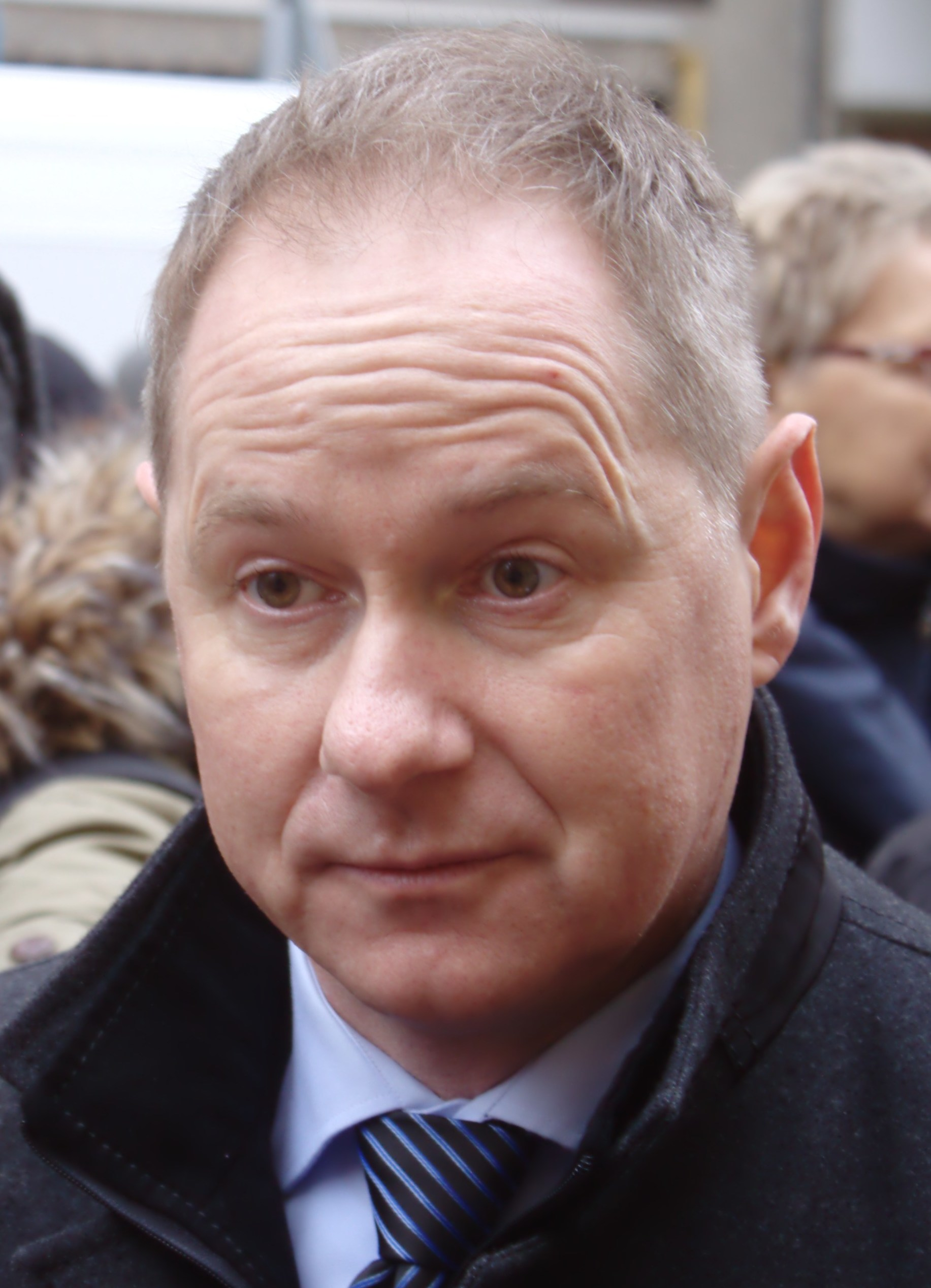
	First party	Second party	Third party
Leader	Pavel Bělobrádek	Petr Fiala	Andrej Babiš
Party	KDU-ČSL	ODS	ANO
Seats won	6	3	3
First round	74,709; 8.48%	103,216; 11.71%	151,388; 17.18%
Second round	78,448; 18.50%	42,551; 10.03%	92,051; 21.71%
	Fourth party	Fifth party	Sixth party
Leader	Bohuslav Sobotka	Miroslav Kalousek	Petr Gazdík
Party	ČSSD	TOP 09	STAN
Seats won	2	2	2
First round	128,830; 14.62%	70,653; 8.02%	43,234; 4.91%
Second round	55,622; 13.12%	30,820; 7.27%	25,389; 5.99%

Senate elections were held in the Czech Republic on 7 and 8 October 2016, with a second round on 14 and 15 of October. The first round was held alongside regional elections and several municipal referendums, notably in a referendum in Brno on the location of the town's train station.

The governing coalition of the Czech Social Democratic Party (ČSSD), ANO 2011 and the Christian and Democratic Union (KDU-ČSL) retained a majority in the full Senate, with the KDU-ČSL making the largest gains, while the Social Democrats incurred the greatest losses, retaining only two of their twelve seats up for re-election. ANO 2011 won the first round with fourteen candidates advancing, but only three of them were elected, which was a disappointment to the party. The most successful opposition party was the centre-right Civic Democratic Party. It had 6 candidates advancing and four of them elected (including Zdeněk Nytra who ran as independent).

== Electoral system ==
One third of the 81-member Senate is elected every two years, giving Senators six year terms. The seats are elected in single-member constituencies using the two-round system.

== Results ==
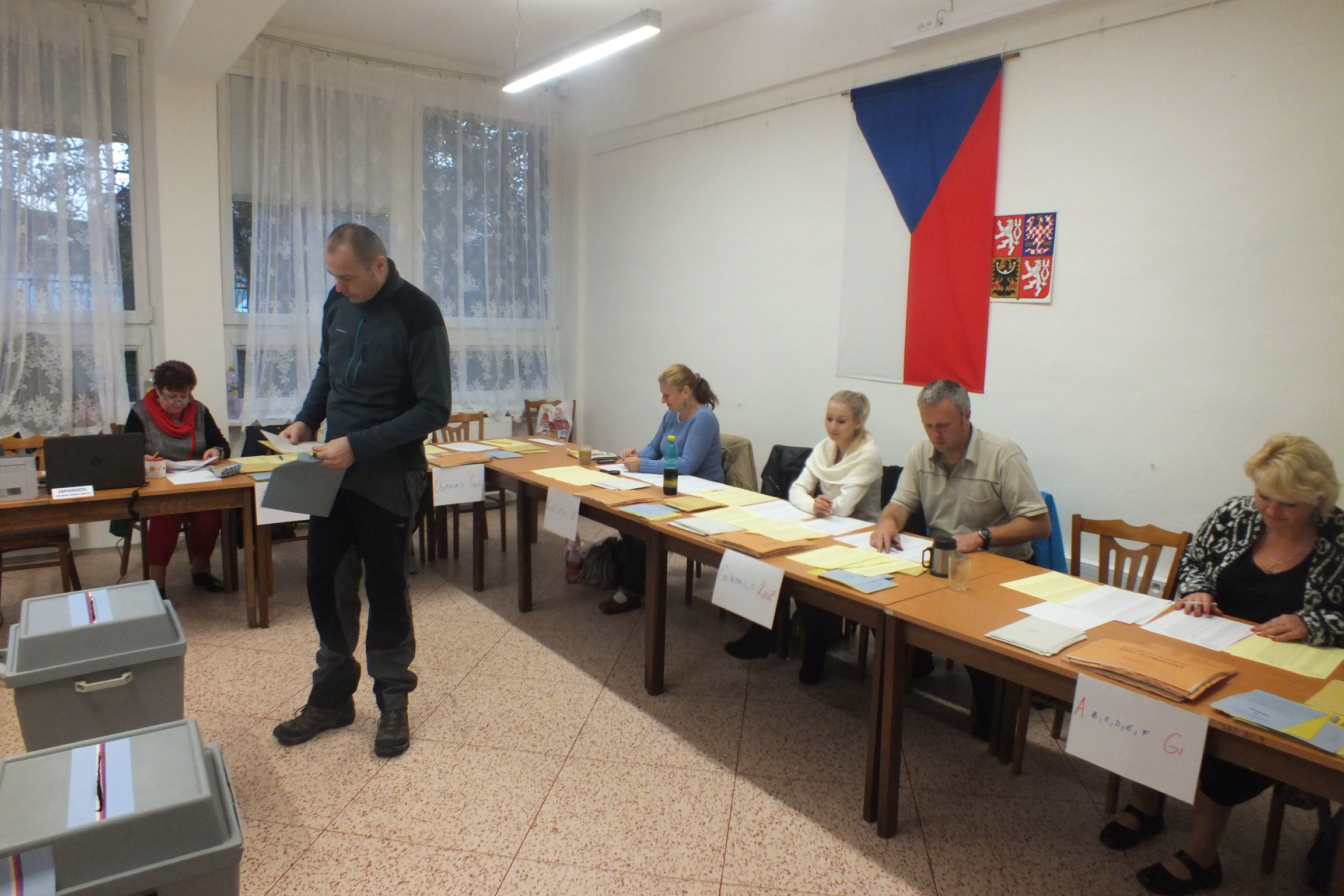
Polling station of the electoral district no. 70 in Olomouc during Czech Senate elections and the regional elections held in the Czech Republic on 7 October 2016

Nominating party	First round			Second round			Seats			
Nominating party	Votes	%	Seats	Votes	%	Seats	Won	Not up	Total	+/–
ANO 2011	151,388	17.18	0	92,051	21.71	3	3	4	7	+3
Czech Social Democratic Party	128,830	14.62	0	55,622	13.12	2	2	23	25	–10
Civic Democratic Party	103,216	11.71	0	42,551	10.03	3	3	6	9	–5
Communist Party of Bohemia and Moravia	83,741	9.50	0	5,737	1.35	0	0	1	1	0
KDU-ČSL	74,709	8.48	0	78,448	18.50	6	6	8	14	+4
TOP 09	70,653	8.02	0	30,820	7.27	2	2	0	2	+1
Mayors and Independents	43,234	4.91	0	25,389	5.99	2	2	3	5	+1
Green Party	18,798	2.13	0	12,565	2.96	1	1	3	4	+1
Mayors for the Liberec Region	18,698	2.12	0	16,579	3.91	1	1	1	2	+1
Nestraníci	16,172	1.84	0	9,849	2.32	1	1	0	1	New
Dawn – National Coalition	16,078	1.82	0				0	0	0	0
Severočeši.cz	14,901	1.69	0	13,377	3.15	2	2	0	2	New
Citizens Together – Independent	12,892	1.46	0	10,804	2.55	1	1	0	1	New
Freeholder Party of the Czech Republic	11,093	1.26	0				0	1	1	0
Independents	9,492	1.08	0	5,634	1.33	0	0	0	0	0
Alternative for the Czech Republic 2017	8,714	0.99	0				0	0	0	New
Czech Pirate Party	7,352	0.83	0				0	1	1	0
Patriotic Citizens	6,424	0.73	0	8,966	2.11	1	1	0	1	New
Tábor 2020	6,358	0.72	0				0	0	0	New
Freedom and Direct Democracy	5,988	0.68	0				0	0	0	0
Moravané	5,394	0.61	0				0	0	0	0
Movement for Prague 11	4,702	0.53	0	9,639	2.27	1	1	0	1	New
Party of Civic Rights	4,618	0.52	0				0	1	1	0
Party of Free Citizens	4,568	0.52	0				0	0	0	0
Change	4,515	0.51	0				0	0	0	New
JsmePRO!	3,432	0.39	0				0	0	0	New
Party of Common Sense	3,325	0.38	0				0	0	0	0
Koruna Česká	3,305	0.38	0				0	0	0	0
Coalition	3,303	0.37	0				0	0	0	New
For Prague	3,033	0.34	0				0	0	0	New
Alternativa	2,709	0.31	0				0	0	0	New
Ostravak	2,147	0.24	0				0	1	1	0
New Future for the Liberec Region	2,003	0.23	0				0	0	0	New
Independent Candidates to the Senate	1,962	0.22	0				0	0	0	New
Ústecká Citizens' Forum	1,961	0.22	0				0	0	0	New
SNK European Democrats	1,882	0.21	0				0	0	0	0
SPR-RSČ	1,812	0.21	0				0	0	0	New
Order of the Nation	1,723	0.20	0				0	0	0	New
Association of Independent Candidates 1	1,685	0.19	0				0	0	0	New
South City – Our Home	1,560	0.18	0				0	0	0	New
Bystrčáci	1,296	0.15	0				0	0	0	New
Workers' Party	1,127	0.13	0				0	0	0	New
HOZK	938	0.11	0				0	0	0	New
National Democracy	830	0.09	0				0	0	0	New
Czech Republic Patriots	632	0.07	0				0	0	0	New
Czechoslovak Community Party	554	0.06	0				0	0	0	New
New Direction	551	0.06	0				0	0	0	New
Nation for Itself	380	0.04	0				0	0	0	New
State Party Direct Democracy – Labour Party	266	0.03	0				0	0	0	New
Czech National Socialist Party	133	0.02	0				0	0	0	New
Independents	6,093	0.69	0	6,058	1.43	1	1	1	2	+1
Total	881,170	100.00	0	424,089	100.00	27	27	54	81	0
Valid votes	881,170	95.52		424,089	99.20					
Invalid/blank votes	41,323	4.48		3,434	0.80					
Total votes	922,493	100.00		427,523	100.00					
Registered voters/turnout	2,780,706	33.17		2,780,597	15.38					
Source: Volby, Volby

=== Re-run in Most ===
On 10 November the results in Most District were annulled due to the illegitimacy of Alena Dernerová's candidature. A re-run of the vote was organised for 27–28 January 2017, in which Dernerová was elected in the first round. Voter turnout was only 12%.

Candidate	Party	Votes	%
Alena Dernerová	United Democrats – Association of Independents	5,933	54.91
Jiří Šlégr	Czech Social Democratic Party	1,700	15.73
Josef Nétek	Communist Party of Bohemia and Moravia	797	7.38
Roman Ziegler	ANO 2011	723	6.69
Jiří Biolek	Mayors and Independents	639	5.91
Libuše Hrdinová	Civic Democratic Party	444	4.11
Jiří Maria Sieber	Order of the Nation	246	2.28
Zbyněk Vodák	TOP 09	195	1.80
Jiří Fiala	Party of Common Sense	128	1.18
Total		10,805	100.00
Valid votes		10,805	99.46
Invalid/blank votes		59	0.54
Total votes		10,864	100.00
Registered voters/turnout		90,567	12.00
Source: Volby
