= 2016 Czech regional elections =

- 7–8 October 2016

675 seats in the regional councils 13 governors
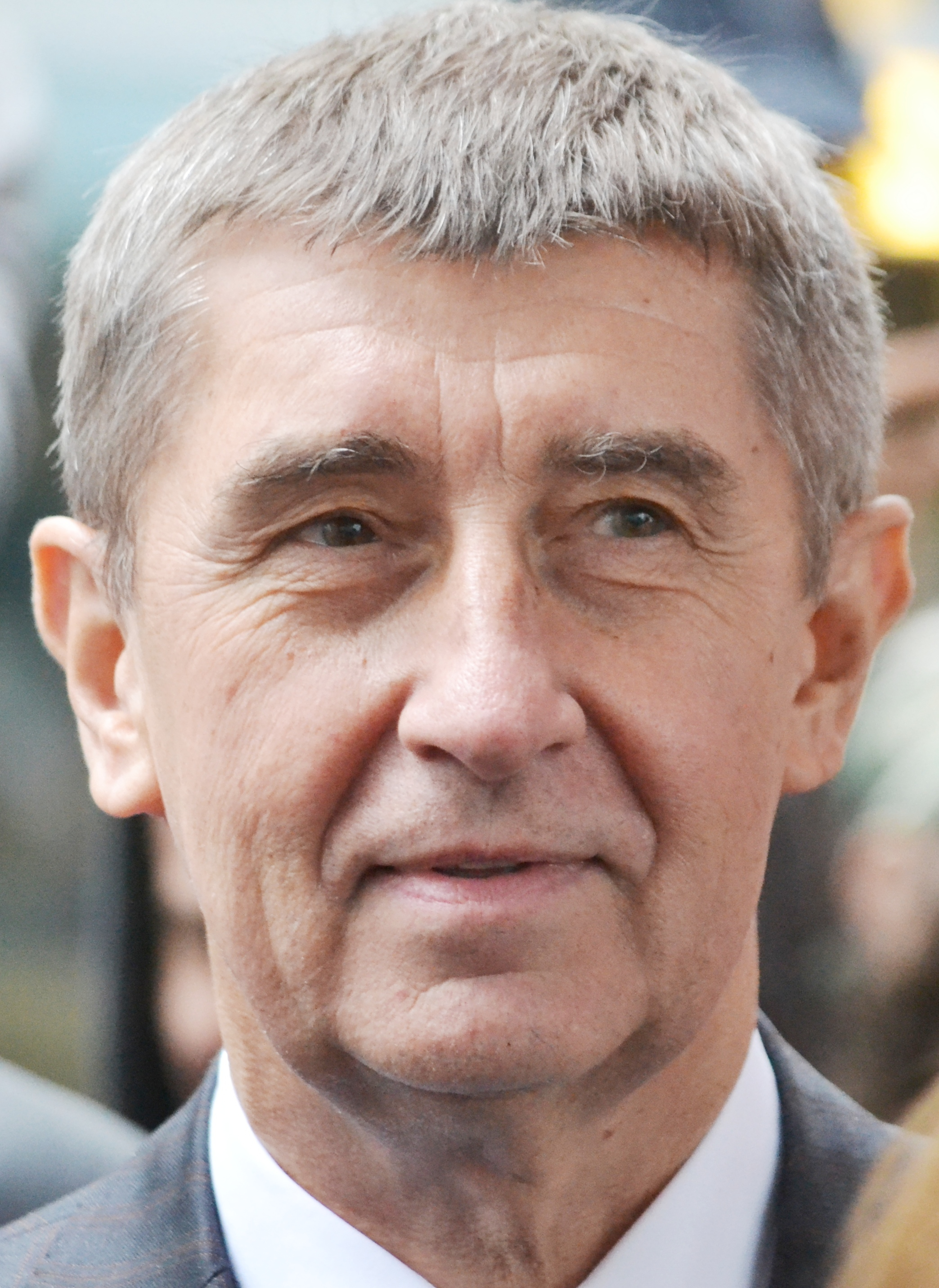

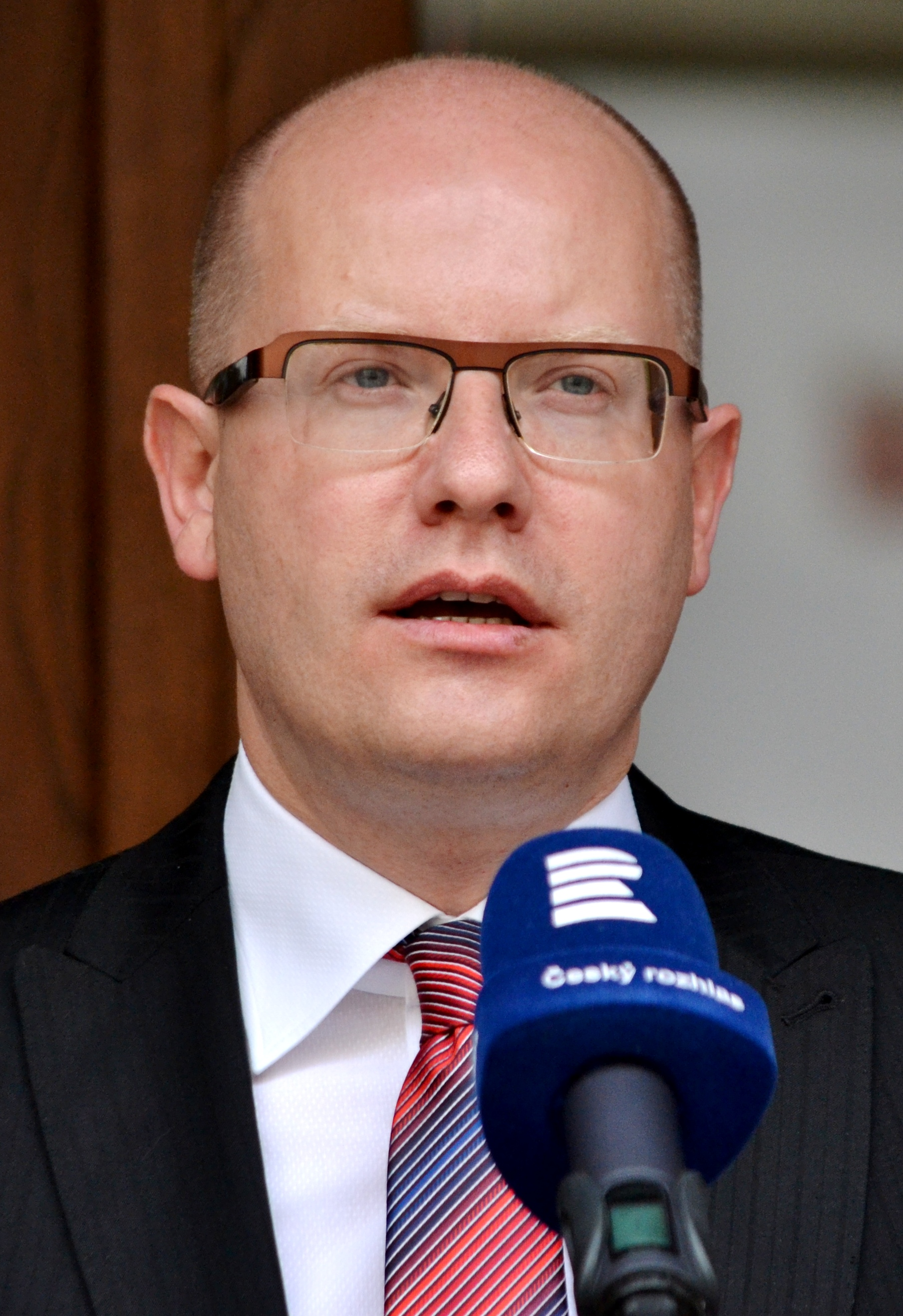

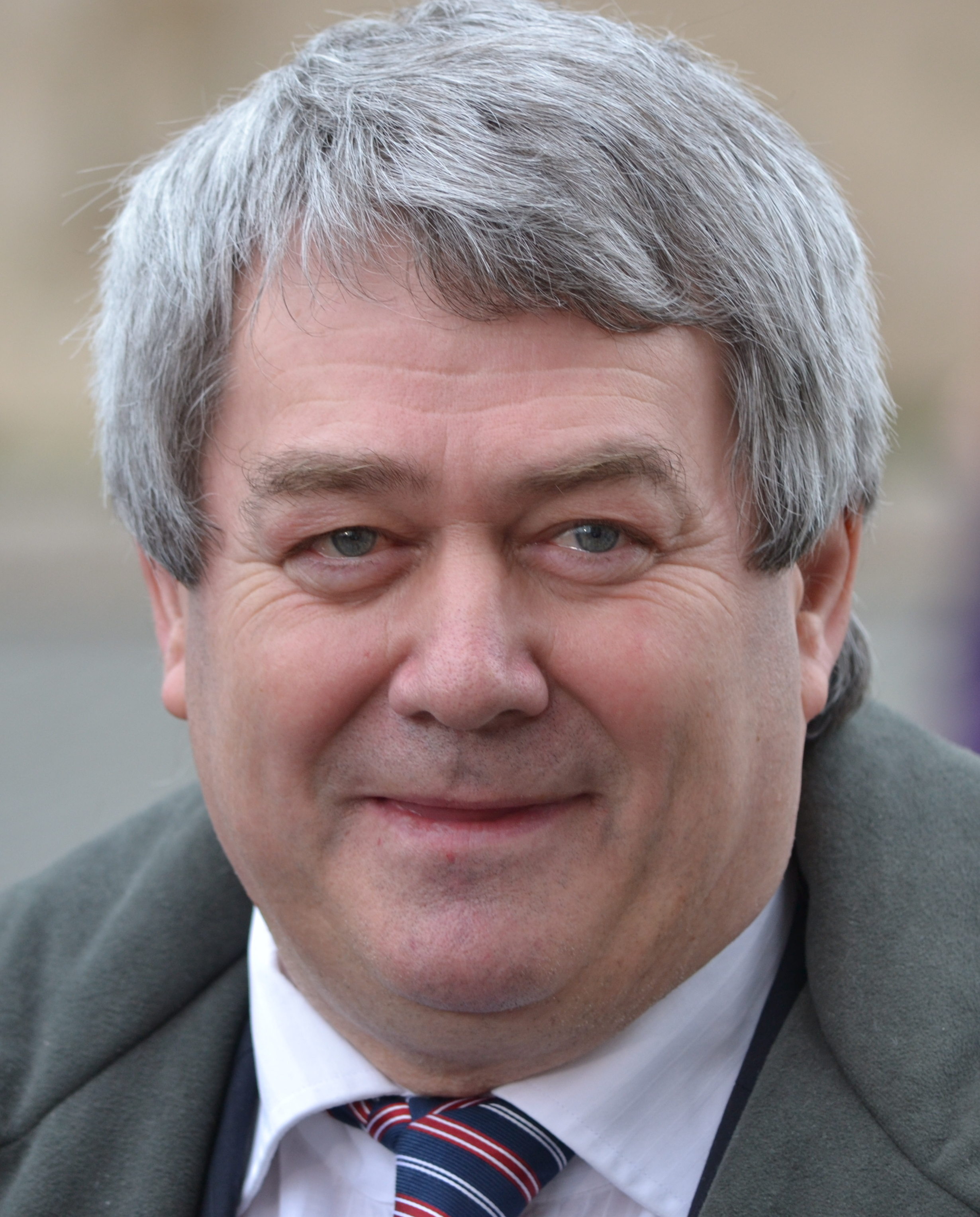

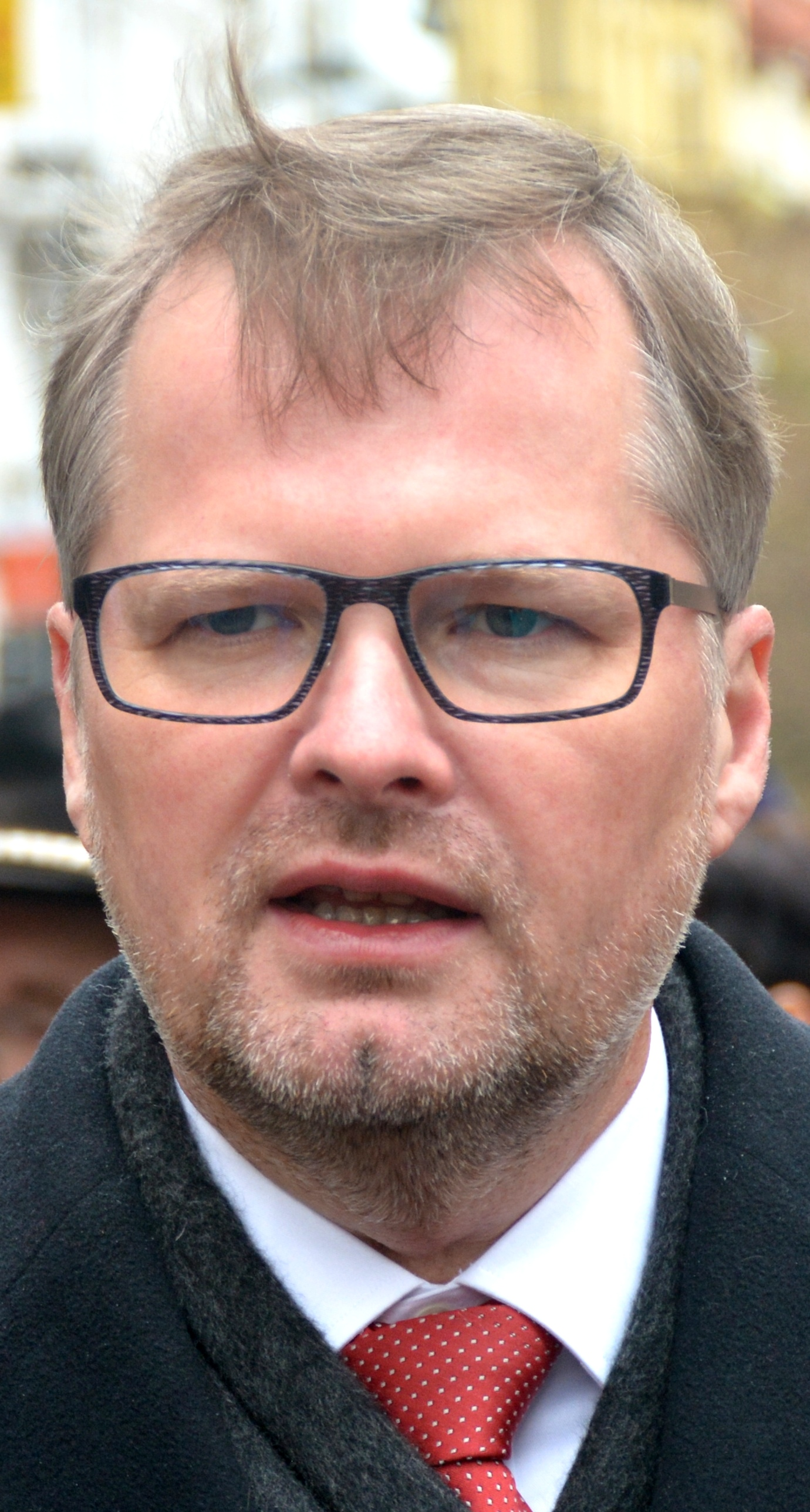

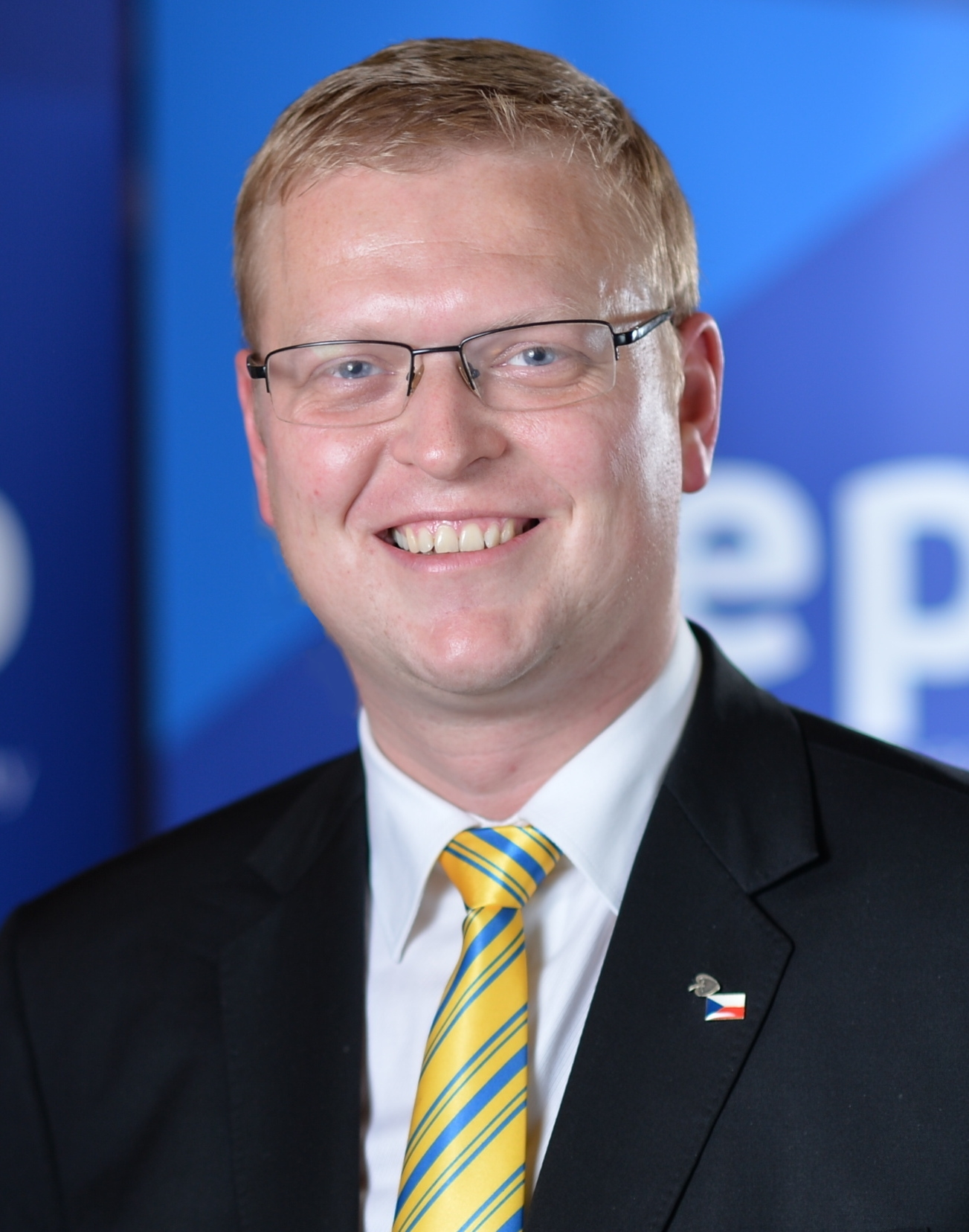

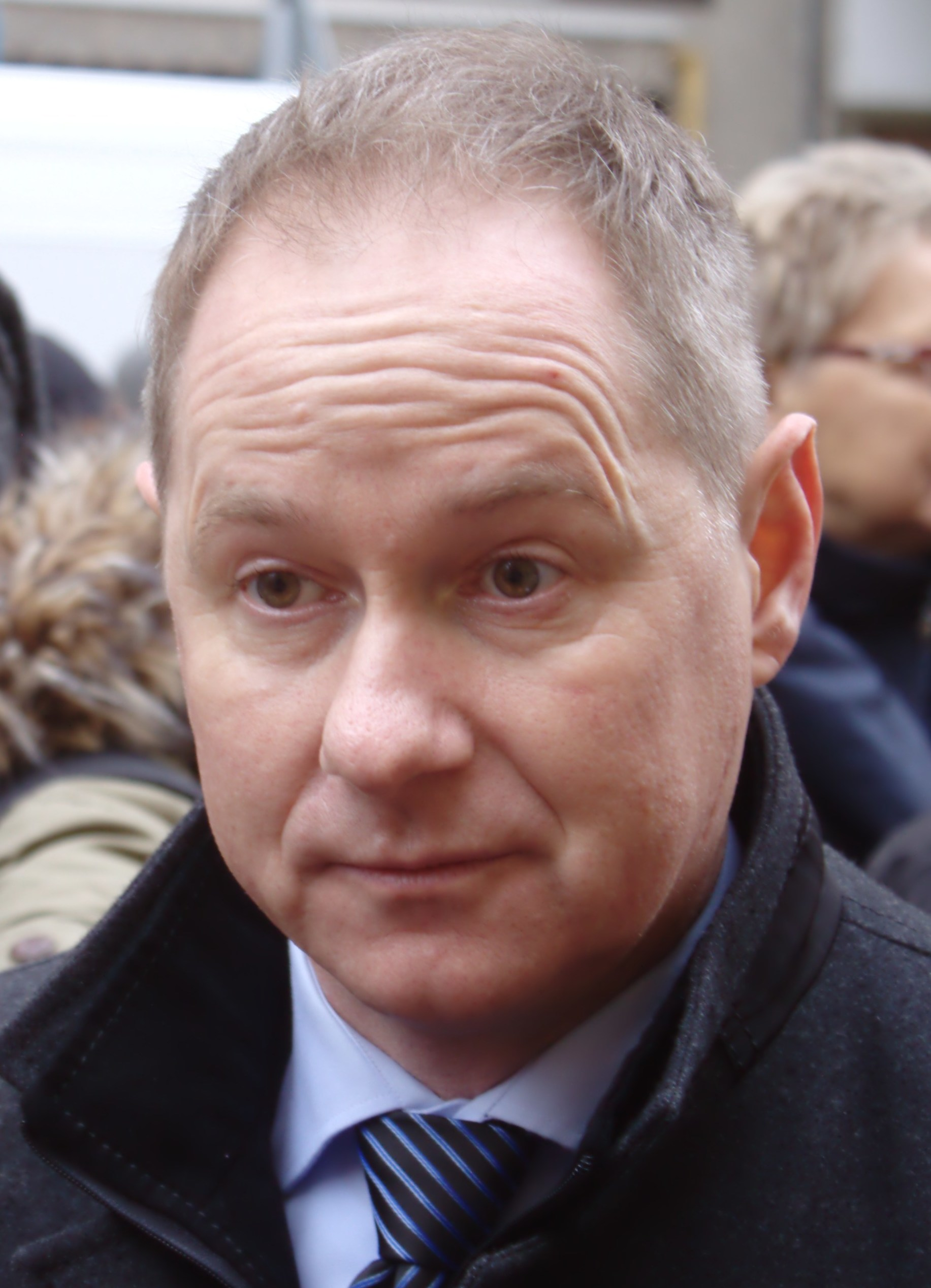
	First party	Second party	Third party
Leader	Andrej Babiš	Bohuslav Sobotka	Vojtěch Filip
Party	ANO	ČSSD	KSČM
Seats won	176	125	86
Seat change	new party	80 ▼	96 ▼
Popular vote	533,061	386,150	267,047
Percentage	21.05%	15.25%	10.55%
Swing	N/A	8.33% ▼	9.88% ▼
Governors	5	5	1
	Fourth party	Fifth party	Sixth party
Leader	Petr Fiala	Pavel Bělobrádek	Petr Gazdík
Party	ODS	KDU-ČSL	STAN
Seats won	76	61	56 (Note: Including Mayors for Liberec Region)
Seat change	26 ▼	0	18 ▲
Popular vote	239,836	159,610	101,696
Percentage	9.47%	6.30%	4.02%
Swing	2.81% ▼	0.48% ▲	^{in 2012 with TOP 09}
Governors	0	1	1
Chairman of Regional Association before election
Michal Hašek
ČSSD
Elected Chairman of Regional Association
Jana Vildumetzová
ANO

Elections to regional councils in the Czech Republic in 13 regions (except Prague) were held on 7 and 8 October 2016.

In one third of constituencies, the elections were combined with Czech Senate elections. Also, several municipal referendums were held, notably in Brno its Central station referendum.

== Background ==
Czech Social Democratic Party has won previous election while its main rival Civic Democratic Party saw large loss o support finishing third. Communist Party of Bohemia and Moravia finished second. 2013 Czech legislative election resulted in political Earthquake as populist ANO 2011 finished second to Social Democrats while Civic Democratic Party was reduced to 5th place.

Czech Social Democratic Party was viewed as front-runner of the election while ANO 2011 was expected to finish second. Civic Democratic Party was expected to become largest right-wing party. Leader of ANO 2011 Andrej Babiš stated that his party is underdog of election and that he hopes to win in 5 regions. Babiš stated that he wants to break rule of Social Democrats and Communists in regions.

== Result ==
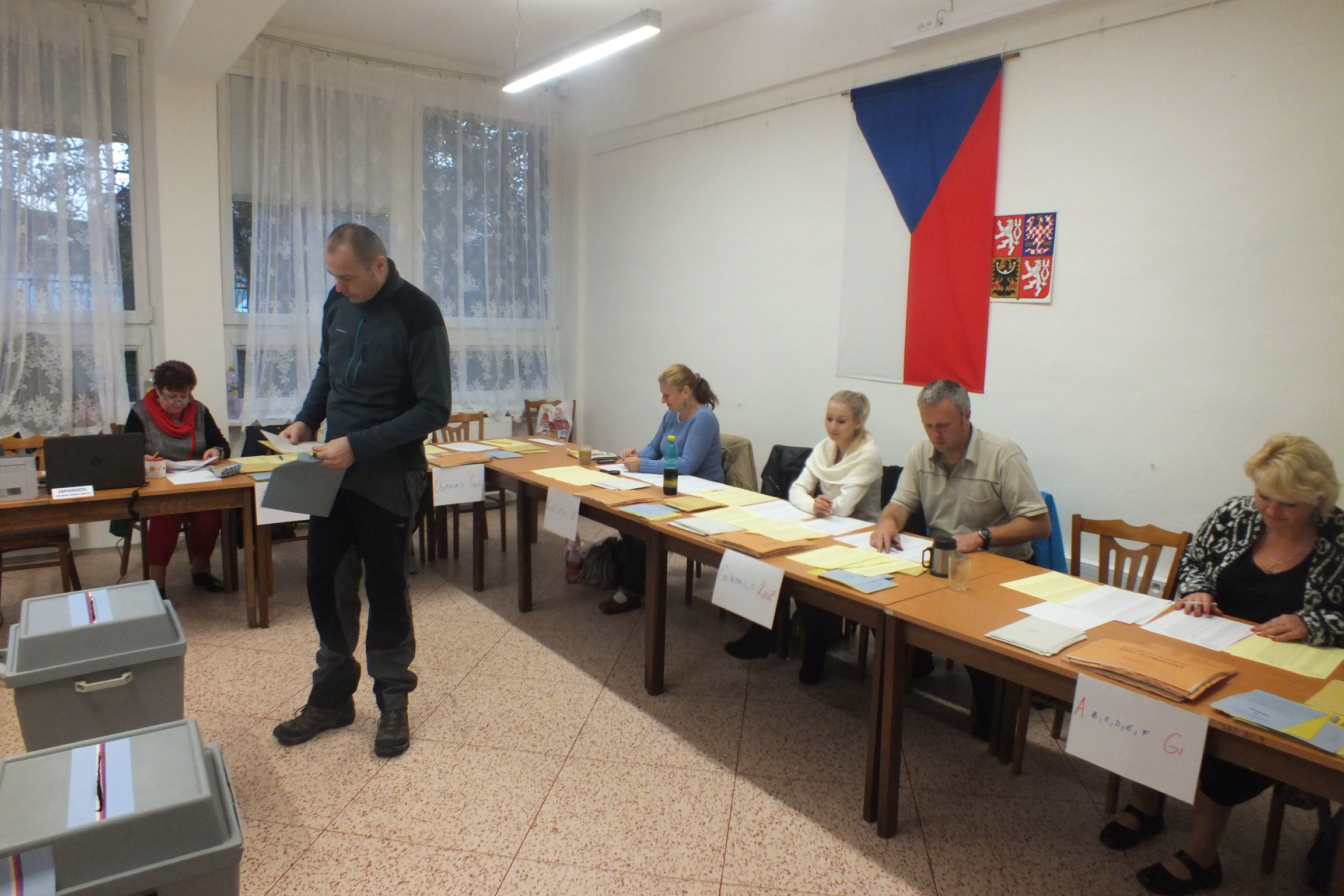
Polling station of the electoral district no. 70 in Olomouc during the regional elections and the Czech Senate elections held in the Czech Republic on 7 October 2016

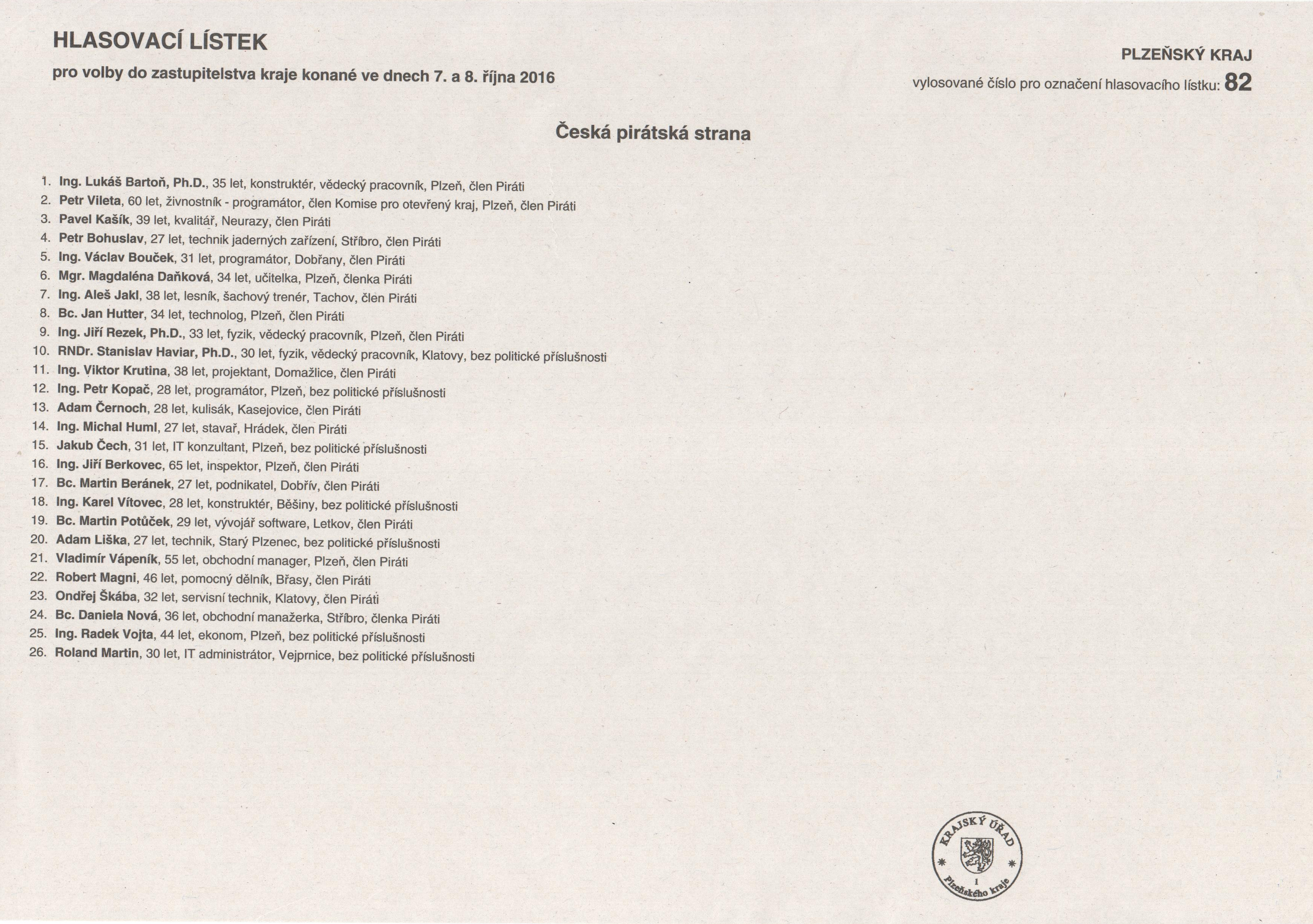
An example of the ballot for the elections. Czech Pirate Party in Plzeň region

Party	Votes	%Votes	Seats
ANO 2011	533,061	21.05%	176
Czech Social Democratic Party	386,150	15.25%	125
Communist Party of Bohemia and Moravia	267,047	10.55%	86
Civic Democratic Party	239,836	9.47%	76
Christian and Democratic Union – Czechoslovak People's Party	159,610	6.30%	42
SPD-SPO	127,328	5.02%	32
Mayors and Independents	101,696	4.02%	24
Mayors for Liberec Region	40,058	1.58%	18
TOP 09	86,164	3.4%	12
Coalition for Pardubice Region	23,421	0.92%	9
Coalition for Olomouc Region with Mayors	19,279	0.76%	7
Coalition for Hradec Králové Region - KDU-ČSL - HDK — VpM	15,912	0.63%	5
For South Bohemia — Mayors, HOPB and TOP 09	14,658	0.58%	5
Free Citizens and Freeholders	46,948	1.85	4
TOP 09 with Mayors and Žít Brno	22 997	0.91%	4
Mayors for South Moravia	21,386	0.84%	4
Mayors and East Bohemians	14,649	0.58%	4
Mayors and Patriots supported by Free Citizens and Freeholders	13,066	0.52%	4
South Bohemians 2012	10,629	0.42%	4
Mayors for Vysočina	10,390	0.41%	4
Change for Liberec Region	8,744	0.35%	4
Czech Pirate Party	44,070	1.74%	3
Greens and Pirates	38,938	0.7%	3
Movement of Independents for Harmonic Development of Municipalities and Cities	4,492	0.18%	3
Freedom and Direct Democracy	16,730	0.66%	2
SPD-SPO-SNK	9,041	0.36%	2
Pirates and Green Party + Change for Hradec Králové Region	15,912	0.34	2
Coalition for Plzeň Region - KDU-ČSL, Green Party and Independents	8,196	0.32%	2

=== South Moravian Region ===
Party	Votes	%Votes	Seats

=== Moravian-Silesian Region ===
Party	Votes	%Votes	Seats

=== Olomouc Region ===
Party	Votes	%Votes	Seats

=== Zlín Region ===
Party	Votes	%Votes	Seats

=== Hradec Králové Region ===
Party	Votes	%Votes	Seats

=== Pardubice Region ===
Party	Votes	%Votes	Seats

=== Central Bohemian Region ===
Party	Votes	%Votes	Seats
ANO 2011	72,795	20.76	16
Mayors and Independents	64,621	18.43	15
Czech Social Democratic Party	48,226	13.75	11
Civic Democratic Party	45,759	13.05	10
Communist Party of Bohemia and Moravia	35,534	10.13	8
TOP 09	22,928	6.54	5
Others	60,676	17.34	0

=== Vysočina Region ===
Party	Votes	%Votes	Seats
Czech Social Democratic Party	29,407	19.37	11
ANO 2011	25,875	17.04	9
Christian and Democratic Union – Czechoslovak People's Party	20,368	13.41	7
Communist Party of Bohemia and Moravia	17,311	11.40	6
Civic Democratic Party	13,819	9.10	5
Starostové PRO VYSOČINU	10,390	6.84	4
SPD-SPO	9,728	6.40	3
Others	24,892	16.44	0
Total	151,790	100	45
Invalid/blank votes	2,480	-	-
Registered voters/turnout	413,171	37.34	-
Source: Volby.cz

=== Plzeň Region ===
Party	Votes	%Votes	Seats
ANO 2011	34,506	21.52	11
Czech Social Democratic Party	27,829	17.35	9
Civic Democratic Party	23,461	14.63	8
Communist Party of Bohemia and Moravia	18,567	11.58	6
Mayors and Patriots	13,066	8.15	4
SPD-SPO	8,559	5.33	2
Coalition for Plzeň Region	8,196	5.11	2
Others	14,764	9.24	0

=== South Bohemian Region ===
Party	Votes	%Votes	Seats
Czech Social Democratic Party	41,299	22.55	15
ANO 2011	32,348	17.67	12
Civic Democratic Party	23,210	12.67	8
Communist Party of Bohemia and Moravia	18,317	10.00	7
For South Bohemia — Mayors, HOPB and TOP 09	14,658	8.00	5
Christian and Democratic Union – Czechoslovak People's Party	12,147	6.63	4
JIH2012	10,629	5.80	4
Others			

=== Karlovy Vary Region ===
Party	Votes	%Votes	Seats

=== Ústí nad Labem Region ===
Party	Votes	%Votes	Seats
ANO 2011	43,308	23.44	20
Communist Party of Bohemia and Moravia	29,480	15.82	13
Czech Social Democratic Party	22,178	11.90	10
Civic Democratic Party	15,909	8.54	7
SPD-SPO	15,909	6.07	5
Others	122,272	34.43	0

=== Liberec Region ===
Party	Votes	%Votes	Seats
Mayors for Liberec Region	40,058	32.35	18
ANO 2011	21.156	17.08	9
Communist Party of Bohemia and Moravia	10,039	8.10	4
Czech Social Democratic Party	9,961	8.04	4
Civic Democratic Party	9,803	7.91	4
ZMĚNA	8,744	7.06	4
SPD-SPO	6,448	5.20	2
TOP 09	4,236	3.42	0
Czech Pirate Party	4,048	3.26	0
BpLK	3,612	2.92	0
SaS	2,380	1.92	0
Dawn - National Coalition	1,397	1.12	0
Others	1,935	1.53	-
