= Ortel =

Czech rock band

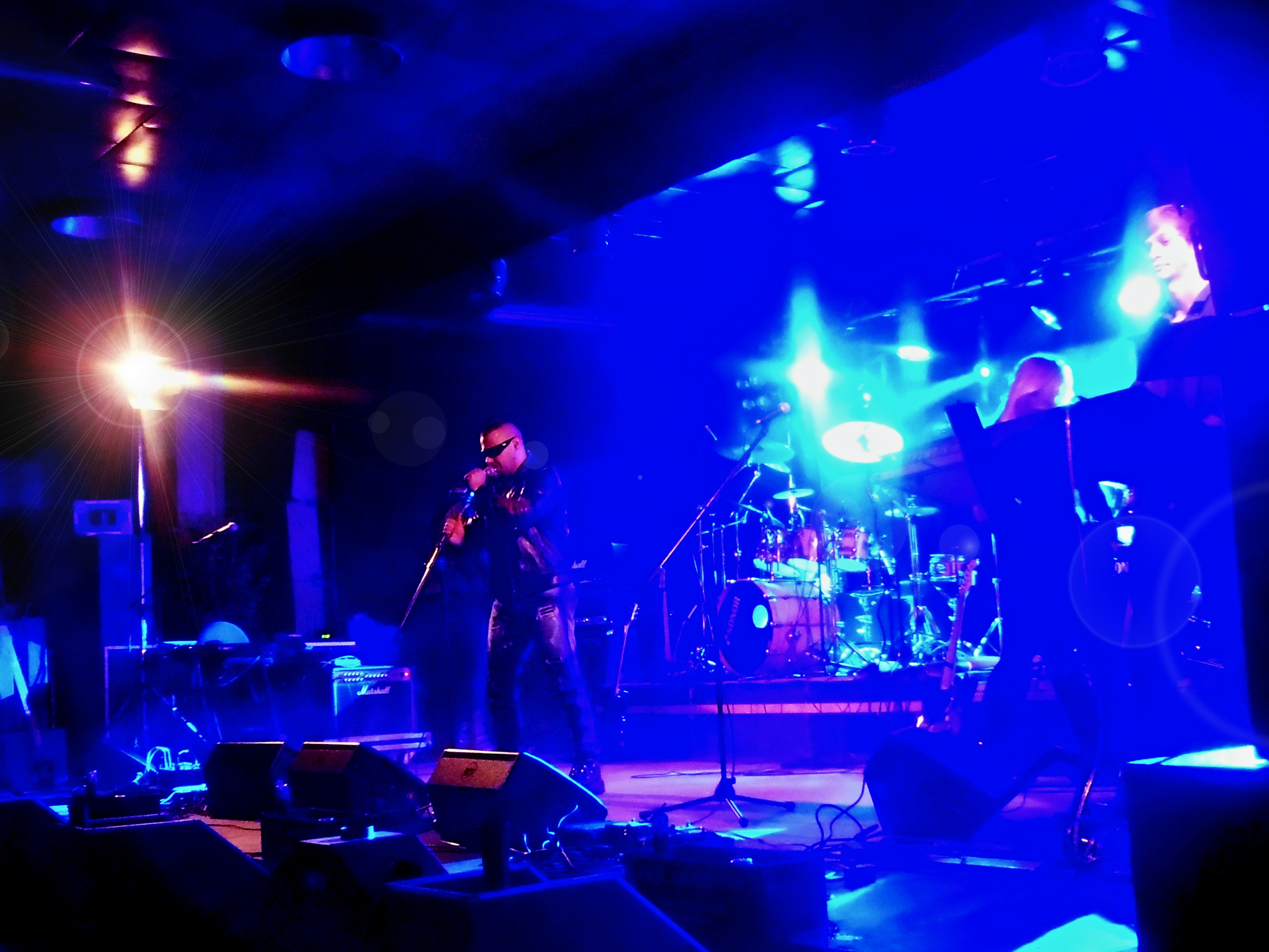
- Ortel performing in 2015

Background information
- Origin: Plzeň, Czech Republic
- Genres: Rock
- Years active: 2002–present
- Members: Tomáš Ortel; Ota; Jaroslav; Míra
- Past members: Lucie Běhounková; Adam; Balů; Karlos
- Website: ortel.cz

Ortel is a Czech rock band from Plzeň, led by its namesake, Tomáš Ortel. The band was founded in 2002 and has been prone to controversy, and they have been variously described in the media as xenophobic, racist, even Neo-Nazi, based on their image and message. In 2015 and 2016, they won second place in the Best Group category of the Český slavík awards. As of 2026, they have released ten studio albums.

== History ==
Tomáš Ortel (born Tomáš Hnídek) founded the group in 2002 after leaving the neo-Nazi band Conflict 88. According to his own statements, his motivation for launching the project was dissatisfaction with events following the 1989 Velvet Revolution in Czechoslovakia. He has stated that the band, while non-political, expresses patriotic sentiments, and he has denied any connection with neo-Nazism.

After its founding, Ortel remained an obscure group until their song "Hadr" was selected as the anthem for the Czech Workers' Party. The group rose to prominence due to their reaction to the 2015 European migrant crisis, in the form of anti-refugee rhetoric, as well as their success at the 2015 Český slavík awards, where they won second place. They repeated this feat the following year.

== Philanthropy ==
Ortel have promoted cancer-related initiatives in the past. In 2014, they supported the foundation Dobrý anděl, helping it gain donors from their fanbase. The charity later severed ties with the band due to the controversial nature of their messaging and image. In 2015 and 2016, they performed at the festival Rockové léto, which is held every year near the town of Litovel in support of cancer patient education.

== Controversy ==
The band has been called right-wing, extremist, xenophobic, racist, populist, and Neo-Nazi by various pundits, journalists, and media personalities. These accusations have been countered by others, however, who have defended the group, such as Jan Charvát from the Faculty of Social Sciences at Charles University, a specialist in the extremist music scene.

Ortel's concerts have previously been scrutinized by the Ministry of the Interior in a regular report on extremism. It concluded that the band exemplifies a trend where song lyrics tend towards right-wing extremism but are worded in such a way that the performers are not at risk of criminal prosecution.

Český slavík

Ortel placed second in the Český slavík awards both in 2015 and 2016, and in 2017, allegations of vote brigading in their favour emerged. As a consequence, the event was cancelled in 2018.

== Reactions ==
Over the years, numerous celebrities and public personalities have criticized Ortel for its image and message. Many have refused to perform at or attend events with the group. These include Radek Banga, vocalist of the hip hop band Gipsy.cz; singer-songwriter Tomáš Klus; singer Benny Cristo; František Táborský, guitarist and vocalist of the band Chinaski; musician David Koller; the punk band Pipes and Pints; and ČSSD politician Jan Chvojka.

Civil members of the Government Council for Roma Affairs have called on public figures to publicly express their opposition to the group, which they believe is connected to the far right, a movement with a history of anti-Romani sentiment in the Czech Republic and other parts of Europe.

Protests against the band's performances have taken place on a number of occasions, including in Počátky in 2015. Then-President of the Senate Milan Štěch urged the city not to organize such events, and his concern was echoed by senator Václav Láska. In February 2016, it was announced that Ortel would perform at the April Říp Pilgrimage, held under Říp hill, near Krabčice. A petition appeared, opposing this on the basis that the event was for families, not supporters of xenophobia and hatred. The petition ultimately failed, and the band proceeded to play their set. Other instances of protests in 2016 include Mladá Boleslav, Olomouc, Mostek, Nový Bor, and Heřmanův Městec.

== Band members ==
Current

- Tomáš Ortel – vocals, guitar
- Ota – guitar
- Jaroslav – bass
- Míra – drums

Past

- Lucie Běhounková – keyboards, vocals
- Adam – keyboards
- Balů – guitar
- Karlos – guitar

== Discography ==
- Nevinnej (2007)
- Co se to stalo (2009)
- Ideje (2010)
- Problém (2012)
- Mešita (2013)
- Defenestrace (2014)
- Zůstaň mým domovem (2015)
- Pochodeň (2017)
- Diktátor (2019)
- Zteč (2022)
