= National Party (Czech Republic) =

National Party Národní Strana
- National Party Logo
- Last leader: Petra Edelmannová
- Founded: 2002
- Dissolved: 2011
- Headquarters: Senovážné nám. 23, Prague
- Ideology: Czech nationalism National conservatism Antiziganism; Euroscepticism; Anti-Islamism; Anti-communism; Neo-Slavism
- Political position: Far-right
- Colours: Blue, Red, White

The National Party (Czech: Národní strana) was a far-right nationalist political party in the Czech Republic. Petra Edelmannová was the last leader of the party.

== Ideology and program ==
They were strongly opposed to Czech membership of the European Union. Their main objectives were to restore a full national sovereignty by minimising influence of foreign institutions and to toughen the national immigration policies.

The Party proposed the so-called "A final solution to the Gypsy issue" to relocate the Roma population of the Czech Republic to India, based on perceived ethnic origins.

On 28 October 2007 the Czech National Party established a paramilitary National Guard.

== Downfall ==
Decline in party membership started showing in 2009. Resignation of the party's leader Petra Edelmannová on 1 December 2009 caused a disintegration of party's leadership and speeded up the process of downfall.
The party was dissolved by the Supreme Administrative Court on 17 August 2011.
