= United Democrats – Association of Independents =

United Democrats - Association of Independents Spojení demokraté - Sdružení nezávislých
- Abbreviation: SD-SN
- Chairperson: Alena Dernerová
- Deputy Leader: Petr Heinzl
- Founder: Jan Kasl
- Founded: 18 July 2002
- Split from: Civic Democratic Party
- Ideology: Conservatism; Euroscepticism
- Political position: Centre-right
- National affiliation: Stačilo! (since 2023)
- European affiliation: European Christian Political Party
- European Parliament group: Non-Inscrits (2024–2025)
- Colours: Blue; Yellow
- Chamber of Deputies: 0 / 200
- Senate: 0 / 81
- European Parliament: 0 / 21

Website
- sdsn.cz

The United Democrats – Association of Independents (Czech: Spojení demokraté - Sdružení nezávislých, SD-SN) is a small Czech extra-parliamentary political party, formed from what remained of the European Democrats (Czech: Evropští demokraté) after that party's merger in 2006 with SNK Association of Independents to form SNK European Democrats.

SD-SN has in the past cooperated with the Mayors and Independents in the Czech Senate. For the 2024 European Parliament election, the party was a member of the Stačilo! alliance, together with the Communist Party of Bohemia and Moravia (KSČM) and the Czech National Social Party (ČSNS), and had one Member of the European Parliament (MEP) elected.

== History ==
The European Democrats were founded in 2002 by Jan Kasl, a former Civic Democrat mayor of Prague. From 2004, this party began cooperating with the SNK Union of Independents, winning 11% of the vote in the 2004 European Parliament election. In January 2006, the European Democrats agreed on a merger with SNK Union of Independents, to become SNK European Democrats; most of the party members left to join the new party.

However, the original party was not dissolved due to an ongoing judicial dispute regarding the 2002 local elections in Prague. The remaining party members renamed the party to United Democrats – Association of Independents (SD-SN) later that year. The party subsequently lost all of its Prague city councilors in the 2006 local elections and all of its regional councilors in the 2008 Czech regional elections.

SD-SN ran independently in the 2009 European Parliament election, receiving 0.06% of the vote and losing its only seat in the European Parliament.

The party did not achieve any further electoral success until 2017, when it nominated Alena Dernerová, Senator since 2010 for S.cz, for the re-run of the 2016 Senate election in Most, which Dernerová won in the first round. In the Senate, Dernerová joined the Mayors and Independents club.

Dernerová failed to hold her mandate in the 2022 Czech Senate election, losing in the second round of the election. Since then, the party has moved in a conservative and anti-system direction. For the 2024 European Parliament election, the party ran as part of the Stačilo! alliance, together with the Communist Party and ČSNS. Its nominee Ondřej Dostál, a lawyer and former health expert for the Czech Pirate Party, was second on the list, and was elected as an MEP. Dostál later joined Stačilo!. Dostál left SD-SN in 2025, remaining a member of Stačilo!.

== Election results ==
=== European Parliament ===
Election	List leader	Votes	%	Seats	+/−	EP Group
2009	Unclear	1,501	0.06 (#29)	0 / 22	New	−
2014	Did not contest			0 / 22	0	−
2019	Did not contest			0 / 22	0	−
2024 (Note: Run as part of the Stačilo! coalition.)	Kateřina Konečná	283,935	9.56 (#4)	1 / 22	▲1	NI

=== Senate ===
Election	First round			Second round			Seats	Total seats	+/–
Election	Votes	%	Place	Votes	%	Place	Seats	Total seats	+/–
2026	5,193	0.45	24th				0 / 27	0 / 81	0
