= Mrákov =

- Municipality
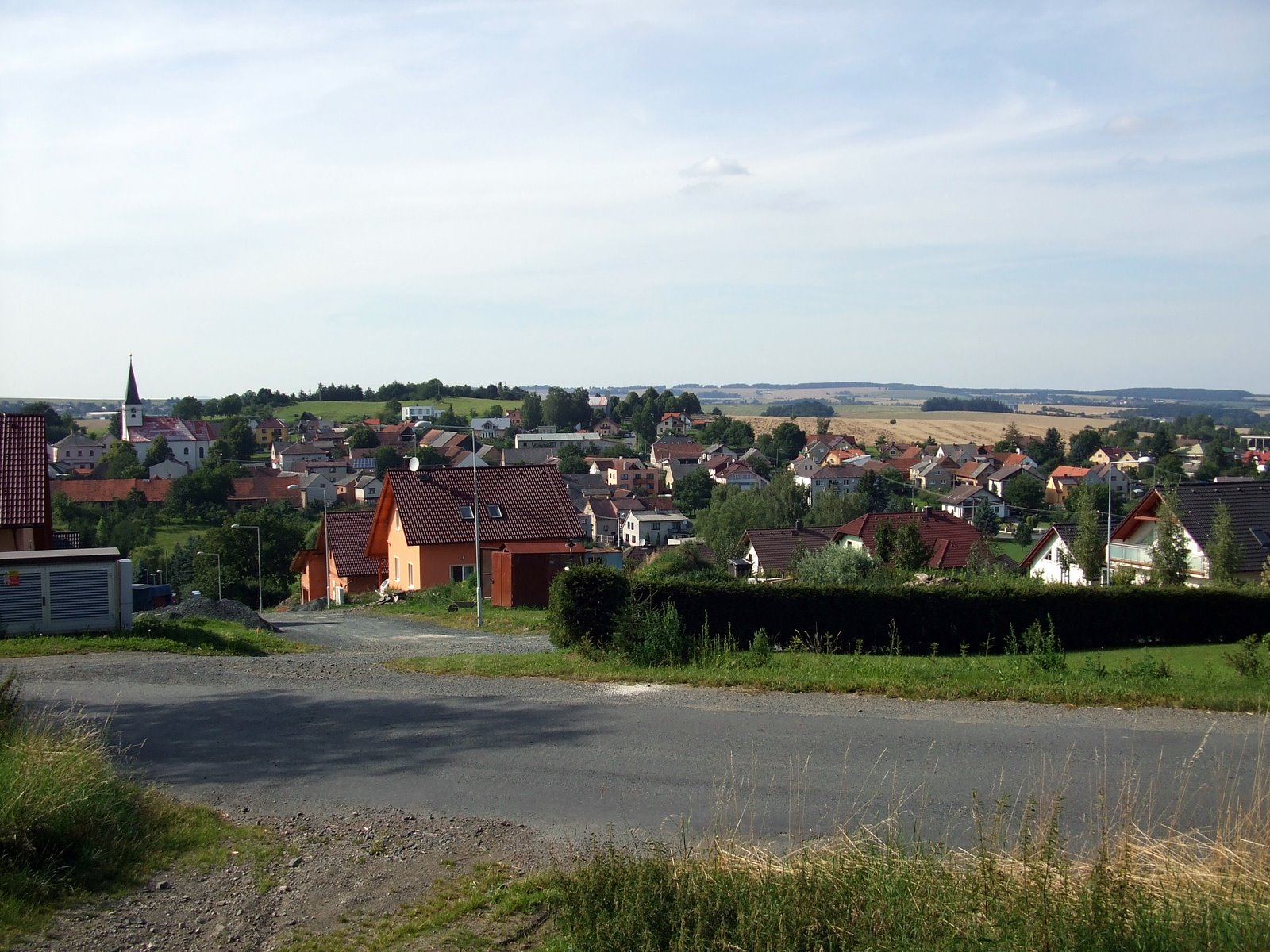
- Panorama of Mrákov

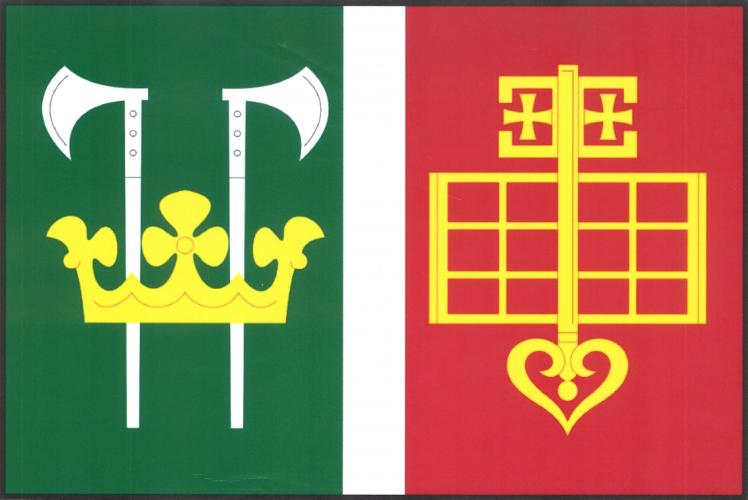
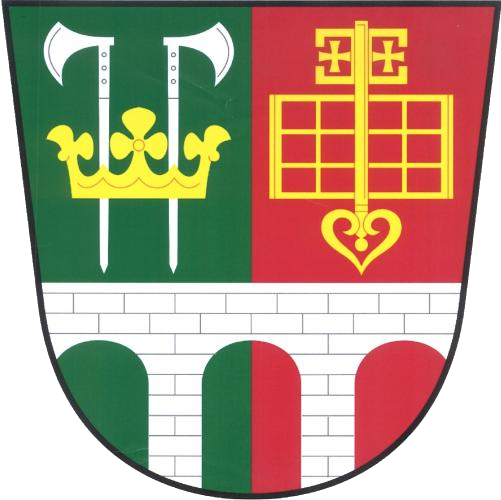
- Flag Coat of arms

- Location in the Czech Republic
- Coordinates: 49°24′4″N 12°57′3″E
- Country: Czech Republic
- Region: Plzeň
- District: Domažlice
- First mentioned: 1325

Area
  - Total: 20.63 km^{2} (7.97 sq mi)
- Elevation: 462 m (1,516 ft)

Population (2026-01-01)
  - Total: 1,153
  - Density: 55.89/km^{2} (144.8/sq mi)
- Time zone: UTC+1 (CET)
  - Summer (DST): UTC+2 (CEST)
- Postal code: 345 01
- Website: www.mrakov.cz

Mrákov is a municipality and village in Domažlice District in the Plzeň Region of the Czech Republic. It has about 1,200 inhabitants.

Mrákov lies approximately 5 kilometres (3 mi) south of Domažlice, 50 km (31 mi) south-west of Plzeň, and 131 km (81 mi) south-west of Prague.

== Administrative division ==
Mrákov consists of five municipal parts (in brackets population according to the 2021 census):

- Mrákov (447)
- Mlýneček (29)
- Nový Klíčov (100)
- Smolov (30)
- Starý Klíčov (443)

== Demographics ==
Historical population
Year	Pop.	±%
1869	1,537	—
1880	1,495	−2.7%
1890	1,432	−4.2%
1900	1,433	+0.1%
1910	1,584	+10.5%
1921	1,467	−7.4%
1930	1,307	−10.9%
1950	997	−23.7%
1961	1,074	+7.7%
1970	1,046	−2.6%
1980	1,091	+4.3%
1991	1,135	+4.0%
2001	1,134	−0.1%
2011	1,154	+1.8%
2021	1,049	−9.1%
Source: Censuses
