= Alena Dernerová =

Czech politician and physician (born 1958)

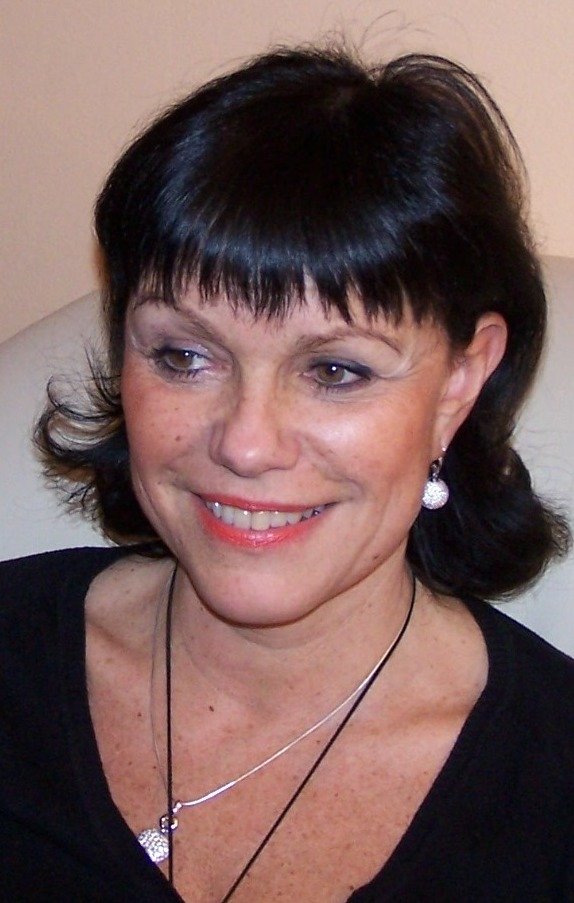
- Dernerová in 2010

Senator for Most
- In office 28 January 2017 – 15 October 2022
- In office 23 October 2010 – 23 October 2016

Member of the Most City Council
- Incumbent
- Assumed office 2 November 2002

Personal details
- Born: 13 September 1958 (age 68) Kopisty, Czechoslovakia
- Party: SD-SN (since 2022)
- Other political affiliations: Stačilo! (since 2024); ProMOST (2018–2022); Independent (2010–2018); SNK ED (2002–2010)
- Education: Charles University
- Occupation: Neurologist • Politician
- Website: adernerova.cz

Alena Dernerová (born 13 September 1958) is a Czech politician and pediatric neurologist. An independent, Dernerová became Senator for Most as a result of the 2010 Czech Senate election, ahead of Social Democrat Zdeněk Brabec in the second round of voting. She was affiliated with the Severočeši.cz movement.
