= Party of Civic Rights =

Czech political party

Party of Civic Rights Strana Práv Občanů
- Logo of Party of Civic Rights
- Abbreviation: SPO
- Founder: Miloš Zeman
- Founded: 8 December 2009
- Dissolved: 31 December 2022
- Split from: Czech Social Democratic Party
- Membership (2016): 2,500
- Ideology: Social democracy Left-wing populism
- Political position: Centre-left
- Colours: Terracotta

Website
- stranaprav.cz

The Party of Civic Rights (Czech: Strana Práv Občanů, SPO), also referred to as Zemanovci ("Zemanites"), was a centre-left, left-wing populist social-democratic political party in the Czech Republic founded in October 2009 by Miloš Zeman, the former prime minister of the Czech Republic and former leader of the Czech Social Democratic Party. Zeman was elected the president of the Czech Republic in the second round of the 2013 Czech presidential election. The party advocated direct democracy and the Nordic model.

In 2014, Jan Veleba, elected as an independent candidate in the 2012 Czech Senate election, joined the party and became its chairman. In the 2014 Czech Senate election, former JZD Slusovice chairman František Čuba was elected as the party's second senator. It has never won a seat in the Chamber of Deputies of the Czech Republic. In the 2016 Czech regional elections, it participated in a coalition with Okamura's Freedom and Direct Democracy party and won 16 seats.

== Chairmen ==
| | Person | Period |
|---|---|---|
| 1. | Miloš Zeman; Honorary chairman (13 November 2010 – present) | 6 March 2010 – 29 May 2010 |
| – | Vladimír Hönig (Vice-chairman) | 29 May 2010 – 13 November 2010 |
| 2. | Vratislav Mynář | 13. November 2010 – 23 March 2013 |
| 3. | Zdeněk Štengl | 23 March 2013 – 29 March 2014 |
| 4. | Jan Veleba | 29 March 2014 – 28 March 2018 |
| 5. | Lubomír Nečas | 28 March 2018 – 7 March 2020 |
| 6. | Martin Šulc | 7 March 2020 – 31 March 2022 |
| – | Marian Kemeridský (Vice-chairman) | 31 March 2022 – 31 December 2022 |

== Election results ==
=== Chamber of Deputies ===
| Year | Leader | Vote | Vote % | Seats | Place |
|---|---|---|---|---|---|
| 2010 | Miloš Zeman | 226,527 | 4.33% | 0 / 200 | 7th |
| 2013 | Zdeněk Štengl | 75,113 | 1.51% | 0 / 200 | 11th |
| 2017 | František Ringo Čech | 18,556 | 0.36% | 0 / 200 | 14th |
| 2021 | did not participate | | | | |

=== Senate ===
| Election | First round | | | Second round | | | Seats |
| Election | Votes | % | Places | Votes | % | Places | Seats |
|---|---|---|---|---|---|---|---|
| 2010 | 17,195 | 1.50 | 10th | - | - | - | 0 / 27 |
| 2012 | 10,894 | 1.24 | 8th | - | - | - | 0 / 27 |
| 2014 | 22,080 | 2.15 | 8th | 11,971 | 2.53 | 7th | 1 / 27 |
| 2016 | 4,568 | 0.52 | 24th | - | - | - | 0 / 27 |

=== Presidential ===
| Election | Candidate | First round result | | | Second round result | | |
| Election | Candidate | Votes | %Votes | Result | Votes | %Votes | Result |
|---|---|---|---|---|---|---|---|
| 2013 | Miloš Zeman | 1,245,848 | 24.21 | First place | 2,717,405 | 54.80 | Won |
| 2018 | Miloš Zeman | 1,985,547 | 38.56 | First place | 2,853,390 | 51.37 | Won |
