= 2010 Czech Senate election =

Senate elections were held in the Czech Republic for a third of the Czech Senate (27 seats) in October 2010. The first round was held on 15 and 16 October 2010, with a second round on 22 and 23 October 2010.

The election was a major success for the Czech Social Democratic Party, who gained 12 seats to become the largest party, with 41. The liberal conservative Civic Democratic Party fell 11 seats to 25, while the centre-right group led by TOP 09 lost 4 seats to leave them on 5 seats: equal with the Christian and Democratic Union – Czechoslovak People's Party.

== Results ==
In the first round, a turnout of 44.33% of voters was reached and no candidate gained 50% of the vote in their district, which means the top two in each district advance to the run-off round. The ČSSD's candidates advanced to the second round in 22 districts despite the fact that they held none of the seats. The ruling ODS, which held 18 of the seats, advanced to the run-off in 19. TOP 09 advanced in 5 seats, KDU–ČSL in 3, the regional Severočeši.cz in 2, Public Affairs in 1, and independent candidates in 2.

| Nominating party | First round | | | Second round | | | Seats | | |
| Nominating party | Votes | % | Seats | Votes | % | Seats | Won | Not up | Total |
|---|---|---|---|---|---|---|---|---|---|
| Czech Social Democratic Party | 290,090 | 25.28 | 0 | 299,526 | 44.02 | 12 | 12 | 29 | 41 |
| Civic Democratic Party | 266,311 | 23.21 | 0 | 225,708 | 33.17 | 8 | 8 | 17 | 25 |
| TOP 09 | 150,046 | 13.08 | 0 | 41,131 | 6.04 | 1 | 1 | 0 | 1 |
| Communist Party of Bohemia and Moravia | 117,374 | 10.23 | 0 | | | | 0 | 2 | 2 |
| KDU-ČSL | 87,182 | 7.60 | 0 | 42,990 | 6.32 | 2 | 2 | 4 | 6 |
| Public Affairs | 57,179 | 4.98 | 0 | 11,973 | 1.76 | 0 | 0 | 0 | 0 |
| Party of Common Sense | 40,295 | 3.51 | 0 | | | | 0 | 0 | 0 |
| Severočeši.cz | 20,062 | 1.75 | 0 | 23,279 | 3.42 | 2 | 2 | 0 | 2 |
| Party of Civic Rights | 17,195 | 1.50 | 0 | | | | 0 | 0 | 0 |
| Mayors and Independents | 15,231 | 1.33 | 0 | 10,179 | 1.50 | 1 | 1 | 2 | 3 |
| Independents | 10,739 | 0.94 | 0 | 10,707 | 1.57 | 0 | 0 | 0 | 0 |
| Green Party | 10,473 | 0.91 | 0 | | | | 0 | 0 | 0 |
| Non-Partisans | 8,751 | 0.76 | 0 | 14,944 | 2.20 | 1 | 1 | 0 | 1 |
| Our Beskydy | 5,694 | 0.50 | 0 | | | | 0 | 0 | 0 |
| Party of Free Citizens | 5,447 | 0.47 | 0 | | | | 0 | 0 | 0 |
| Alternative | 4,544 | 0.40 | 0 | | | | 0 | 0 | 0 |
| Mayors for the Region | 3,728 | 0.32 | 0 | | | | 0 | 0 | 0 |
| Czech Party of Regions | 3,494 | 0.30 | 0 | | | | 0 | 0 | 0 |
| Democratic Party of Greens | 3,348 | 0.29 | 0 | | | | 0 | 0 | 0 |
| Doctors (For the Recovery of Society) | 1,875 | 0.16 | 0 | | | | 0 | 0 | 0 |
| Czech National Social Party | 1,791 | 0.16 | 0 | | | | 0 | 0 | 0 |
| Czech National Socialist Party | 1,773 | 0.15 | 0 | | | | 0 | 0 | 0 |
| Workers' Party of Social Justice | 1,744 | 0.15 | 0 | | | | 0 | 0 | 0 |
| Moravané | 1,738 | 0.15 | 0 | | | | 0 | 0 | 0 |
| Victoria.cz | 1,616 | 0.14 | 0 | | | | 0 | 0 | 0 |
| Party for the Open Society | 1,289 | 0.11 | 0 | | | | 0 | 0 | 0 |
| Czech Pirate Party | 1,131 | 0.10 | 0 | | | | 0 | 0 | 0 |
| Citizens of the City, City of the Citizens | 1,069 | 0.09 | 0 | | | | 0 | 0 | 0 |
| SNK European Democrats | 964 | 0.08 | 0 | | | | 0 | 0 | 0 |
| Conservative Party | 943 | 0.08 | 0 | | | | 0 | 0 | 0 |
| Koruna Česká | 828 | 0.07 | 0 | | | | 0 | 0 | 0 |
| State Party Direct Democracy – Labour Party | 449 | 0.04 | 0 | | | | 0 | 0 | 0 |
| Folklore and Society | 197 | 0.02 | 0 | | | | 0 | 0 | 0 |
| Independents | 12,800 | 1.12 | 0 | | | | 0 | 0 | 0 |
| Total | 1,147,390 | 100.00 | 0 | 680,437 | 100.00 | 27 | 27 | 54 | 81 |
| Valid votes | 1,147,390 | 94.57 | | 680,437 | 99.59 | | | | |
| Invalid/blank votes | 65,834 | 5.43 | | 2,834 | 0.41 | | | | |
| Total votes | 1,213,224 | 100.00 | | 683,271 | 100.00 | | | | |
| Registered voters/turnout | 2,774,178 | 43.73 | | 2,774,982 | 24.62 | | | | |
Source: Volby
