= Czech National Socialist Party =

Political party in the Czech Republic

Czech National Socialist Party Česká strana národně socialistická
- Abbreviation: ČSNS 2005
- President: Jiří Stanislav (2005–2008); Karel Janko (2008–2022)
- Founder: Jiří Stanislav
- Founded: December 2005; 20 years ago
- Dissolved: 28 May 2022; 4 years ago
- Split from: Czech National Social Party
- Merged into: Czech National Social Party
- Newspaper: Naše České slovo
- Ideology: Popular socialism Left-wing nationalism Left-wing populism Euroscepticism; Anti-communism
- Political position: Left-wing
- Colors

The Czech National Socialist Party (Czech: Česká strana národně socialistická), abbreviated to ČSNS 2005, was a political party in the Czech Republic. Founded in 2005 by members of the Czech National Social Party because of financial problems of that party, ČSNS 2005 was committed to the heritage of the First Republic Czechoslovak National Socialist Party, party of Edvard Beneš or Milada Horáková. The Czech National Socialist Party was a Eurosceptic party and cooperated with the party Sovereignty – Jana Bobošíková Bloc.

In 2011, the party wanted to merge with the National Socialists – Left of the 21st century, which had been established by Jiří Paroubek, so that Paroubek's party would have historical succession with the original Czech National Social Party, but the parties ultimately did not legally merge, only some party members switched to Paroubek's new party.

On 28 May 2022, Czech National Socialist Party, and also the National Socialists, "merged" into the original Czech National Social Party (the party dissolved and its members re-registered as members of the original Czech National Social Party).

== See also ==
- Czech National Social Party
- List of political parties in the Czech Republic
