= Severočeši.cz =

Czech political party

Severočeši.cz Severočeši.cz
- Leader: Bronislav Schwarz
- Founded: April 2008
- Ideology: Ústí nad Labem regionalism Populism
- Chamber of Deputies: 0 / 200
- Senate: 1 / 81
- European Parliament: 0 / 22

Severočeši.cz (English: North Bohemians.cz) is a regionalist political party in the Czech Republic. It operates in the Ústí nad Labem Region of northern Bohemia.

The party won two seats in the Senate in the 2010 election: Jaroslav Doubrava in Ústí nad Labem and Alena Dernerová in Most.
