= 2010 Czech parliamentary election =

- 28–29 May 2010

All 200 seats in the Chamber of Deputies 101 seats needed for a majority
- Turnout: 62.55% (▼1.87pp)
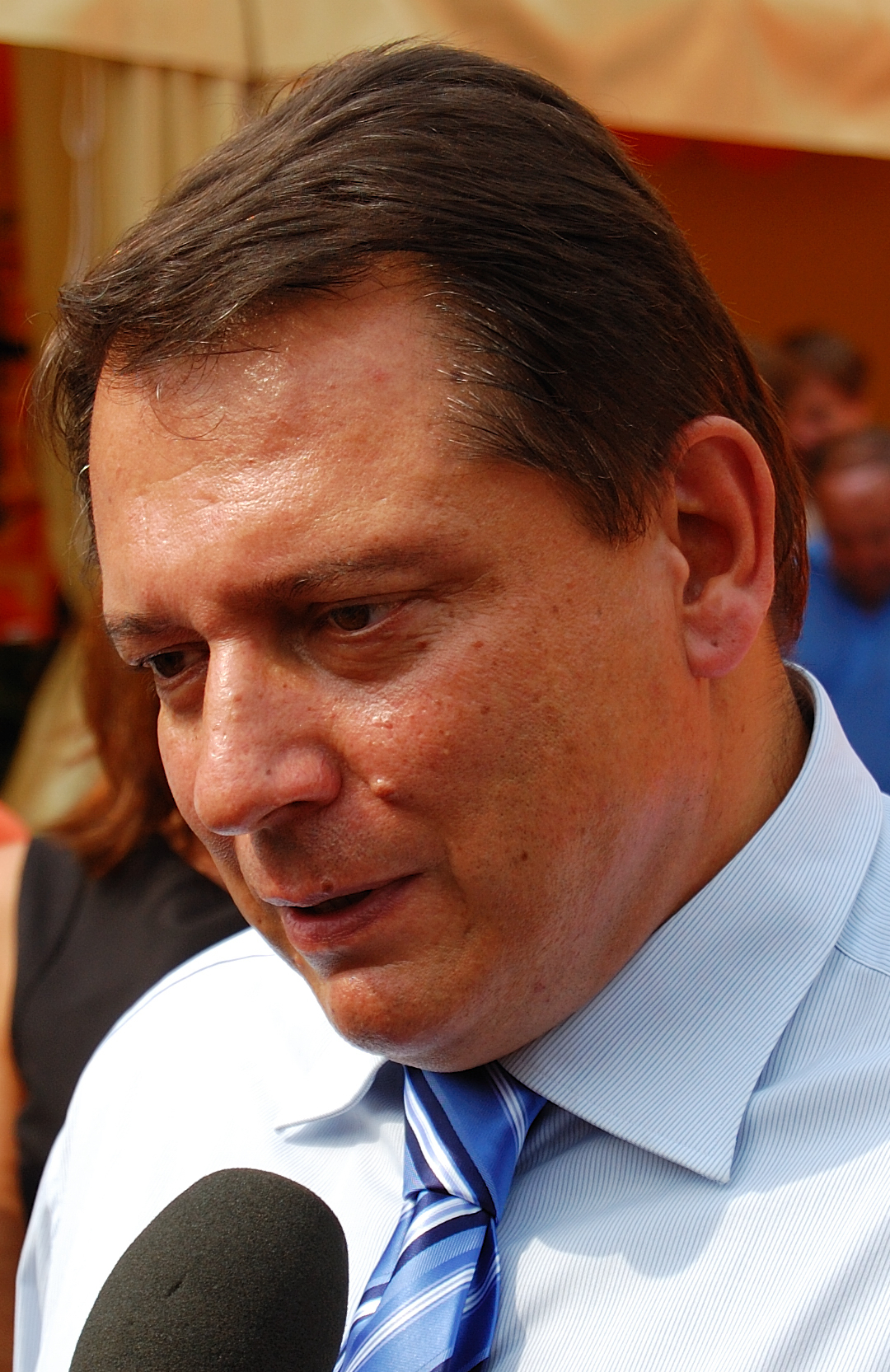

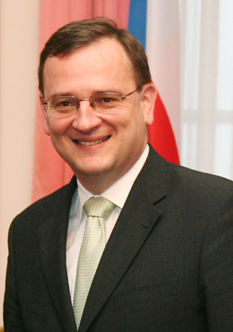

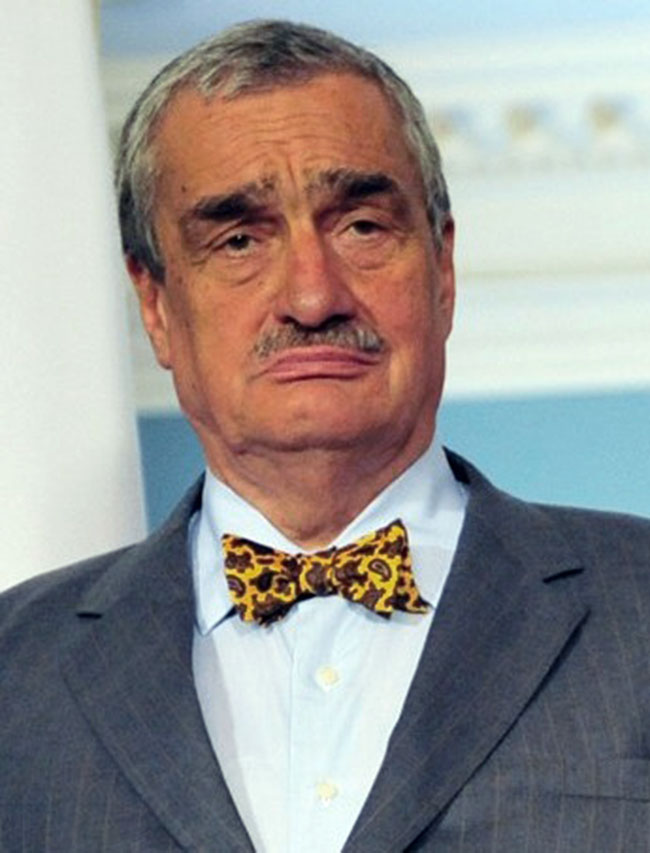

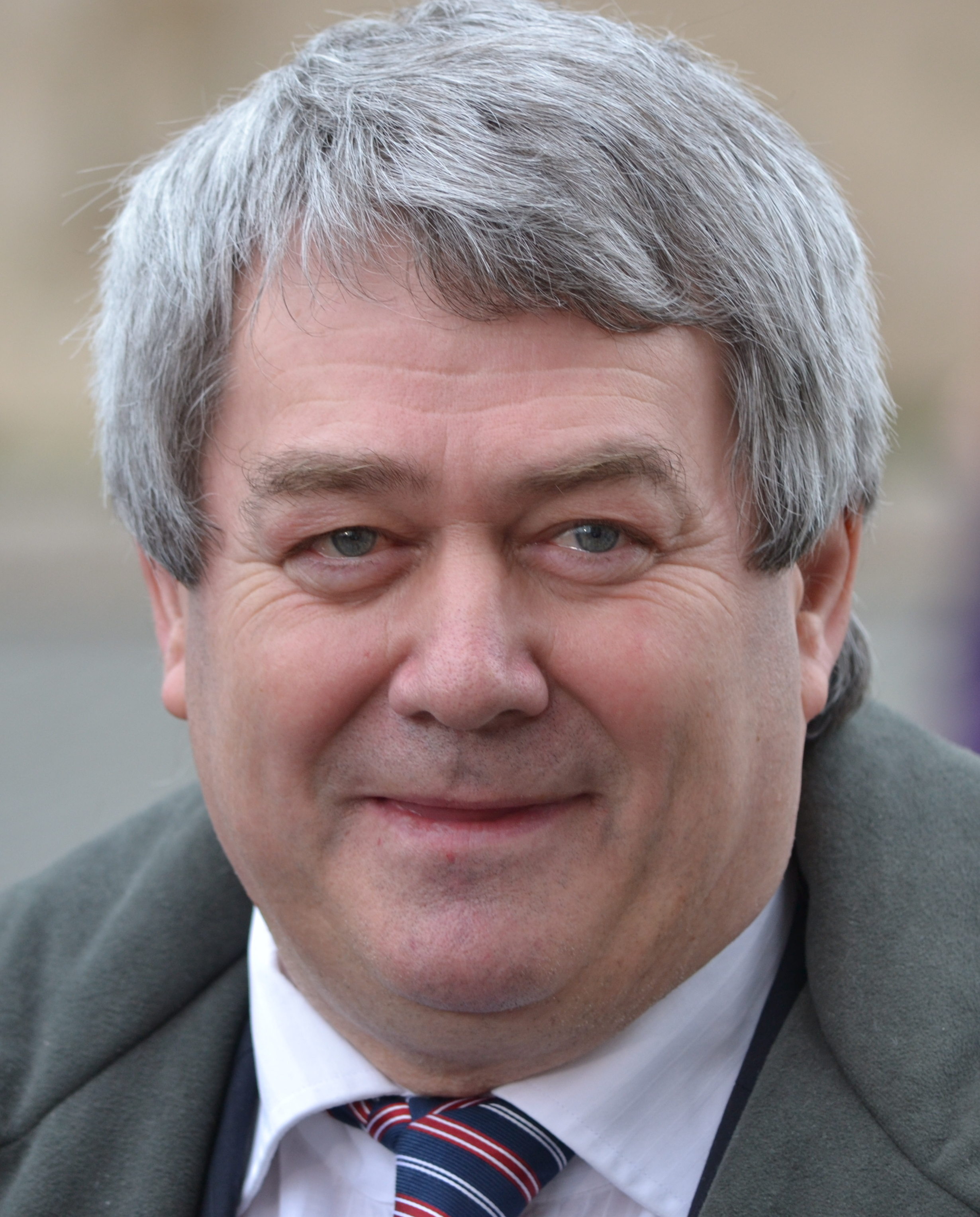

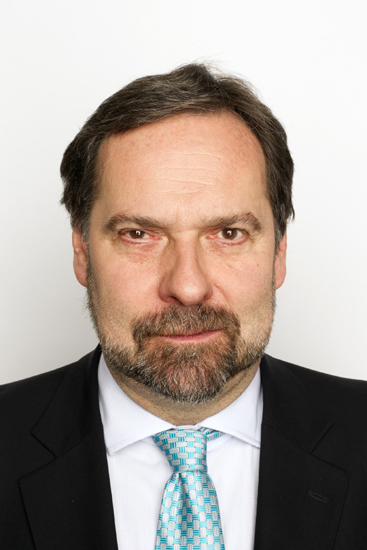
	First party	Second party	Third party
Leader	Jiří Paroubek	Petr Nečas	Karel Schwarzenberg
Party	ČSSD	ODS	TOP 09
Last election	32.32%, 74 seats	35.38%, 81 seats	Did not exist
Seats won	56	53	41
Seat change	▼18	▼28	New
Popular vote	1,155,267	1,057,792	873,833
Percentage	22.09%	20.22%	16.71%
Swing	▼10.23pp	▼15.16pp	New
	Fourth party	Fifth party
Leader	Vojtěch Filip	Radek John
Party	KSČM	VV
Last election	12.81%, 26 seats	Did not exist
Seats won	26	24
Seat change	Steady	New
Popular vote	589,765	569,127
Percentage	11.27%	10.88%
Swing	▼1.54pp	New
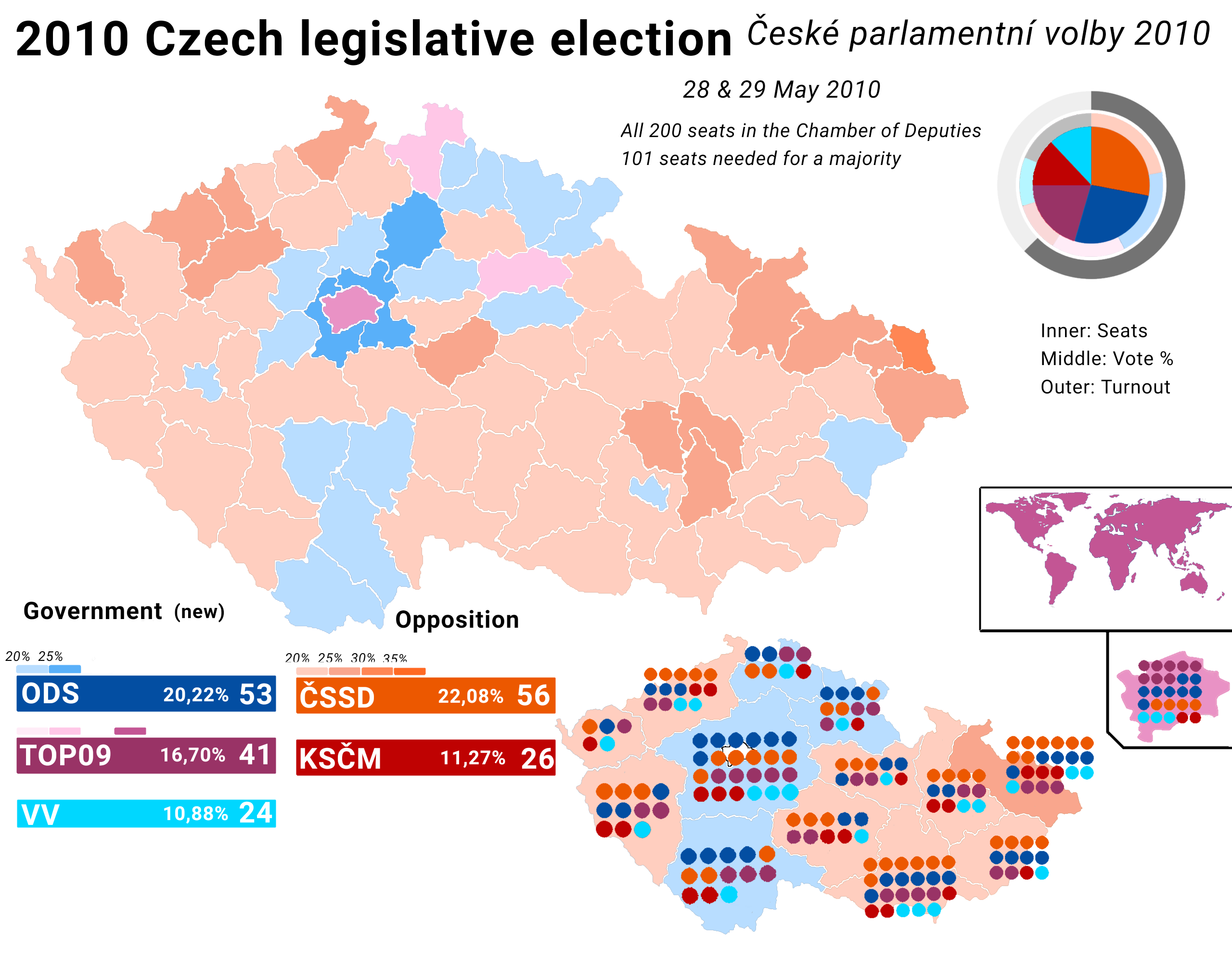
Prime Minister before election
Jan Fischer
Independent
Prime Minister after election
Petr Nečas
ODS

Parliamentary elections were held in the Czech Republic on 28–29 May 2010 to elect the 200 members of the Chamber of Deputies. The elections had been expected to take place sometime before the end of 2009, but was postponed due to legal challenges. Before the election, the country had been governed by a caretaker administration headed by Jan Fischer. The Czech Social Democratic Party (ČSSD) was the front-runner of the election and its leader Jiří Paroubek was the favourite to become the new prime minister.

ČSSD came first in the election, although they suffered significant losses in seats and the popular vote. The conservative Civic Democratic Party (ODS) and TOP 09 followed in second and third, with the Communist Party finishing fourth. ČSSD leader Jiří Paroubek resigned after the election, conceding that a conservative coalition government appeared likely due to the rise in support for two new right-wing parties: TOP 09 and Public Affairs (VV). In June, a centre-right coalition of ODS, TOP 09, and VV was formed, with Petr Nečas becoming the prime minister.

== Background ==
On 24 March 2009, after four previous failed attempts, the opposition ČSSD succeeded in passing a no confidence vote against the government of Prime Minister Mirek Topolánek (ODS) in the lower house of the Czech parliament. The measure passed with 101 votes to 96, with several members of Topolánek's own party voting with the opposition.

On 28 March 2009, ČSSD leader Jiří Paroubek and Topolánek agreed to hold early elections in October 2009. They later agreed to form an interim government of experts (before the end of the Czech EU presidency), with half of the government nominated by ČSSD and half by two parties of the incumbent government (ODS and The Greens; the third party KDU–ČSL did not participate), and that early elections would be held on 16–17 October 2009. On 5 April 2009, Paroubek and Topolánek agreed on Jan Fischer, the head of the national statistical office, as the interim prime minister, to take over on 8 May 2009, and stated that elections would be held by 15 October 2009, most likely on 9–10 October 2009.

The newly founded party Tradition Responsibility Prosperity 09 (TOP 09), which had split off from the KDU–ČSL, also contested the election. Some polls showed the party to be in fourth place, closely behind the Communist Party.

The election date was initially scheduled for 1 July 2009, but ex-ČSSD Independent MP Miloš Melčák filed a complaint with the Constitutional Court, on the grounds that he had a right to sit in parliament for a full term, and the election was postponed while the court examined the legality of the law setting the election date. A hearing was scheduled for 10 September 2009; if the court ruled against the complaint at that hearing, elections would be held as planned, but politicians agreed that they would rather change the constitution to simplify the procedure of calling early elections, and using the new provisions, the election would be held with a delay of at most one month, regardless of the court's decision, most likely on 6–7 November.

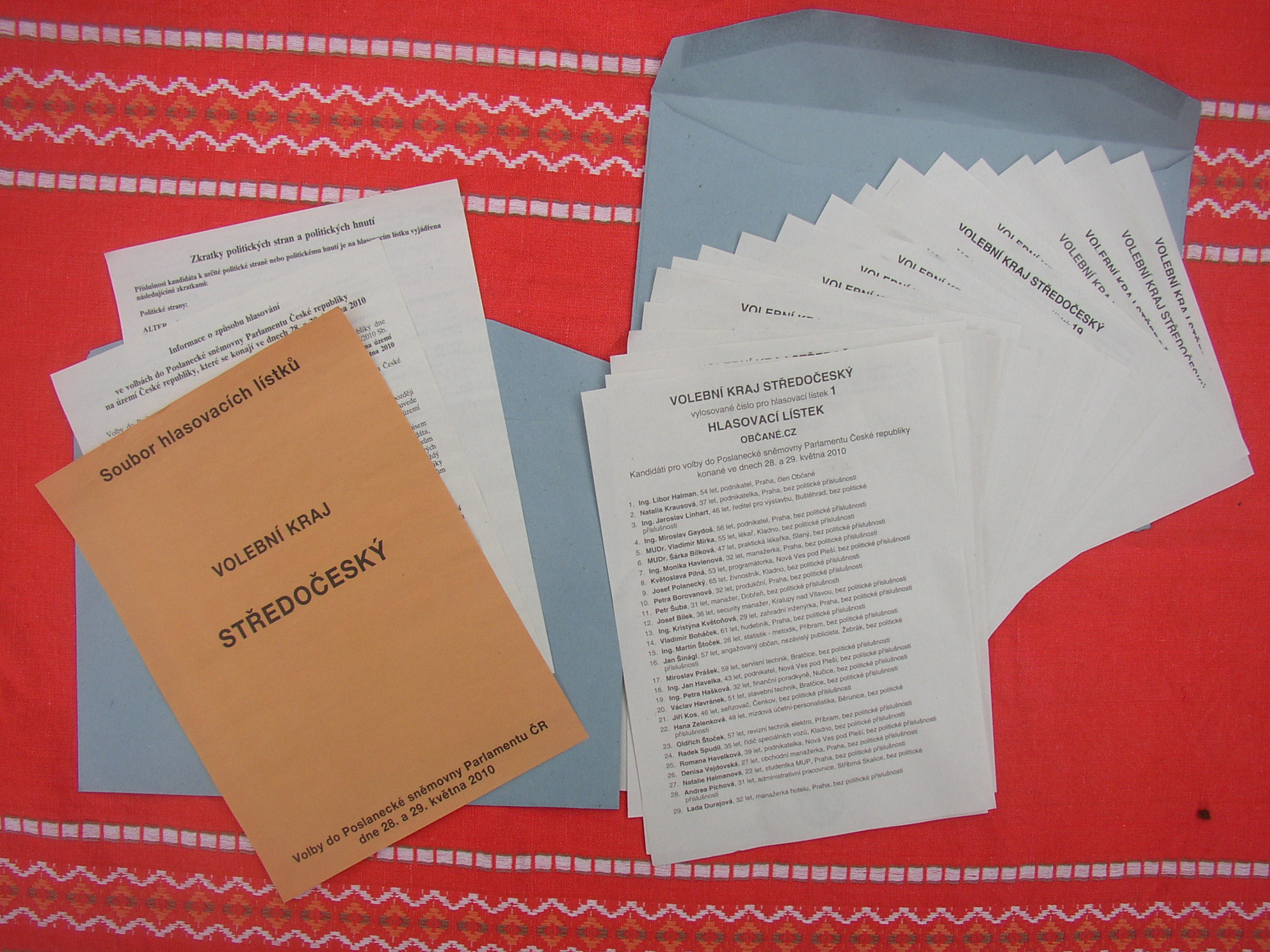
Set of ballots with instructions (version for electoral district of Central Bohemia) as delivered to voters at least three days prior to elections

However, the Constitutional Court viewed the constitutional amendment calling for one-off early elections as a retroactive decision in violation of the existing constitutional procedures regulating early elections, and struck down the act on the grounds that it violated the procedure for constitutional amendments, the right to vote, and the inalienable principle of a law-abiding state. As the Court ruled the election date invalid, the laws (a constitutional amendment and a law shortening election deadlines) were passed on 11 September as planned. President Klaus signed the laws on 12 September, and parliament planned to dissolve itself on 15 September. Melčák stated, however, that he would likely file another complaint if this plan went ahead.

In a surprise move, ČSSD announced on 15 September that it would not vote in favour of dissolution, as the new law was likely to be challenged by Melčák again, and this would again call the legality of the election into question; they were now in favour of elections in mid-2010, on the initially scheduled dates. ČSSD had 71 seats and needed ten more MPs to support their position to delay the election, but it was considered likely that they would succeed in blocking the election. The Christian and Democratic Union (KDU-ČSL) also withdrew their support for early elections, meaning the election would be held in May 2010.

Following controversial comments about the Catholic Church, Jews and homosexuals, ODS chairman Topolánek withdrew from the election and resigned as party leader on 26 March 2010. He was replaced by Petr Nečas.

== Contesting political parties and candidates ==
Party	Ideology	Leader	2006 result	
Civic Democratic Party (ODS)	Conservatism, Economic liberalism, Euroscepticism	Petr Nečas	35.4%	81 / 200
Czech Social Democratic Party (ČSSD)	Social democracy, Pro-Europeanism	Jiří Paroubek	32.3%	74 / 200
Communist Party of Bohemia and Moravia (KSČM) • Party of Democratic Socialism	Communism, Euroscepticism	Vojtěch Filip	12.8%	26 / 200
TOP 09 • Mayors and Independents • Mayors for Liberec Region	Liberal conservatism, Pro-Europeanism	Karel Schwarzenberg	new	
Public Affairs (VV) • SNK European Democrats	Conservative liberalism, Populism	Radek John	didn't contest	
Christian and Democratic Union - Czechoslovak People's Party (KDU-ČSL)	Christian democracy, Social conservatism, Pro-Europeanism	Cyril Svoboda	7.2%	13 / 200
Green Party (Zelení) • Party for the Open Society	Green politics, Pro-Europeanism	Ondřej Liška	6.3%	6 / 200
Party of Civic Rights (SPO)	Social democracy	Miloš Zeman	new	
Sovereignty – Party of Common Sense	Nationalism, Euroscepticism	Jana Bobošíková	0.5%	0 / 200
Workers' Party of Social Justice (DSSS)	Neo-Nazism, Ultranationalism, Anti-globalism, Euroscepticism	Tomáš Vandas	0.2%	0 / 200
Czech Pirate Party (Piráti)	Pirate politics, Direct and Participatory democracy, Open state, Liberalism	Ivan Bartoš	new	
Party of Free Citizens (Svobodní) • Law and Justice	Classical liberalism, Right-libertarianism, Libertarian conservatism, Euroscepticism	Petr Mach	new	
Coalition for Republic – Republican Party of Czechoslovakia (SPR–RSČ)	National conservatism, Anti-immigration, Czechoslovak unionism, Euroscepticism	Miroslav Sládek	0.2%	0 / 200

== Campaign ==
Issues that featured heavily in the campaign included the Greek government-debt crisis, the 2008 financial crisis, the possibility of national bankruptcy, and corruption.

=== Civic Democratic Party (ODS) ===
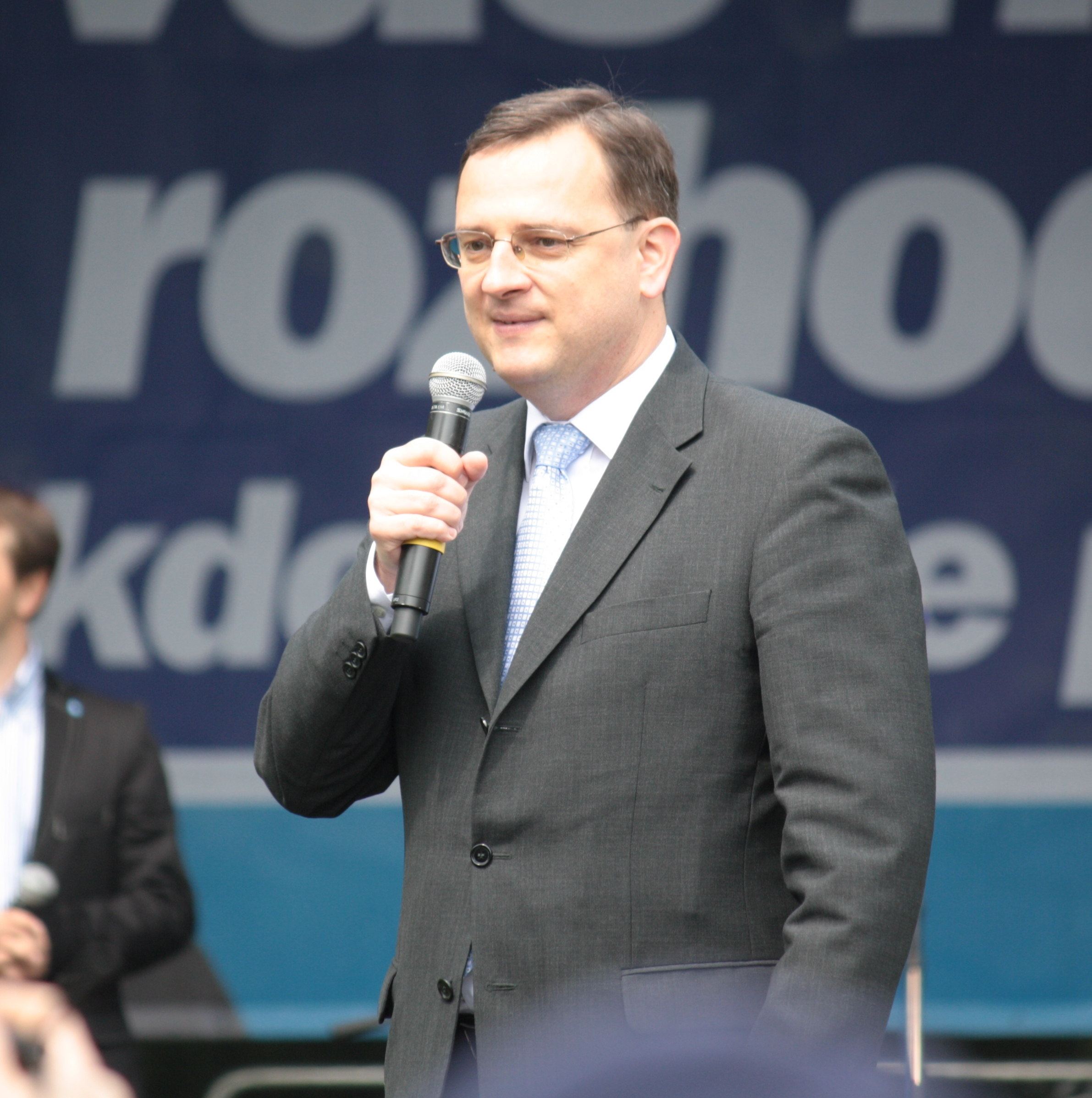
Petr Nečas during an ODS campaign event on Kampa Island, Prague

ODS launched its campaign on 16 March 2010, with reducing unemployment as the main focus. The party stated it would support shorter working periods and employment of graduates and seniors. The party used mannequins of fictional characters Václav Dobrák and Marie Slušná as campaign mascots and the campaign slogans "ODS is the solution" and "It won't happen without your vote."

When their main rival ČSSD used blue ambulances in their campaign to attack ODS, the party reacted by parking a demolished orange ambulance outside the Chamber of Deputies to depict how healthcare would look if ČSSD led the government.

The previous leader of ODS, former prime minister Mirek Topolánek, was replaced as leader by Petr Nečas on 26 March 2010, considered a more acceptable and popular candidate than Topolánek. ČSSD leader Jiří Paroubek stated that he could cooperate with Nečas in some circumstances. Nečas rejected Paroubek's comments and stated that ODS would not form a Grand coalition with ČSSD after the election.

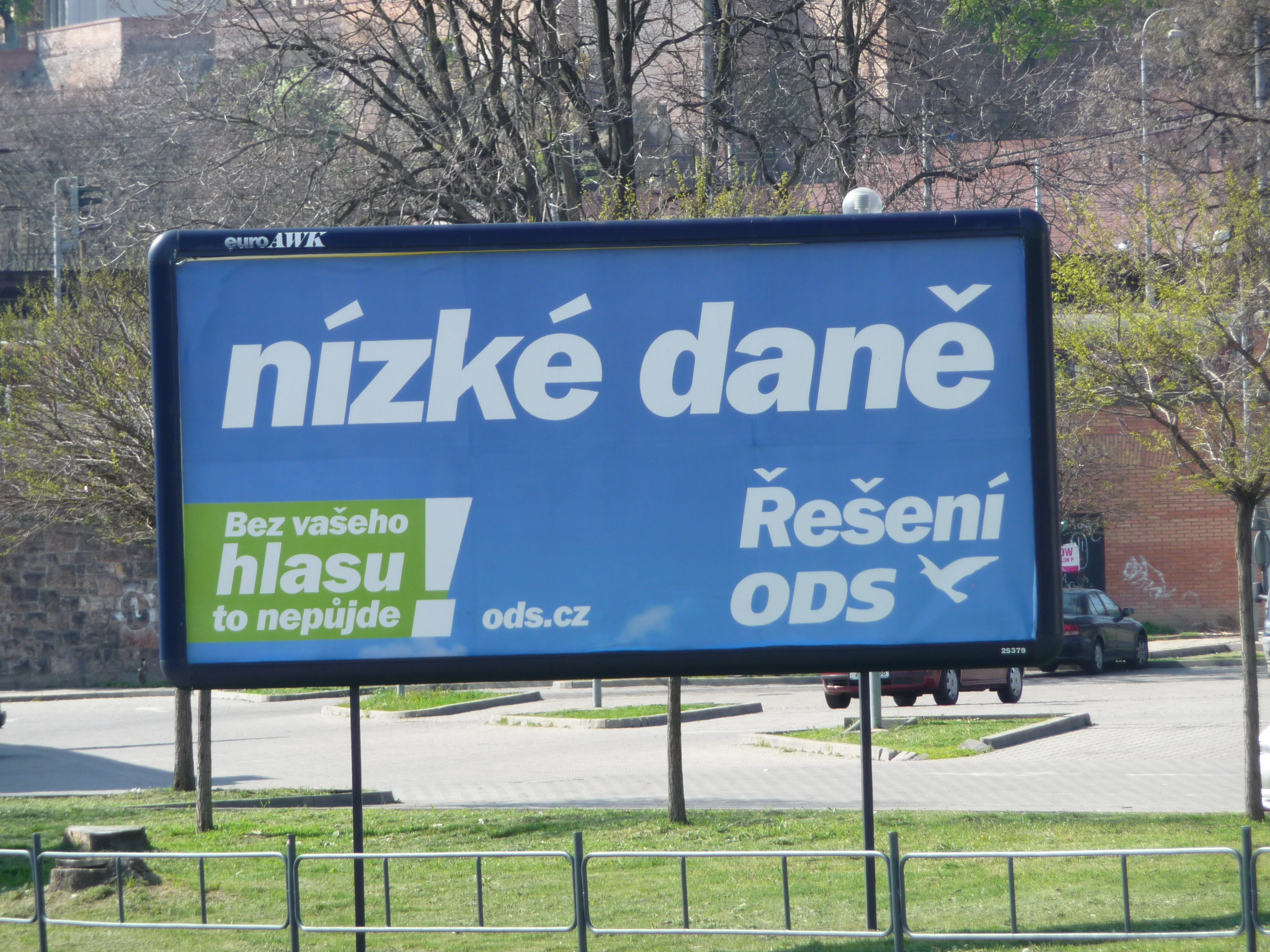
ODS billboard promising lower taxes

ODS started focusing on economics and public finances in April 2010, promising to reduce public debt to avoid bankruptcy, and using the example of Greece to warn against ČSSD. The party also used negative campaigning against ČSSD, focused primarily on Paroubek.

The Civic Democrats conducted an active campaign on the internet, communicating with potential voters on Facebook, Twitter and YouTube. The party held an online "virtual demonstration" against ČSSD. On 30 April 2010, ODS released an election advert entitled "Your vote", commemorating the trial of Milada Horáková and the Warsaw Pact invasion of Czechoslovakia, and warning against Social Democrats and Communists. The clip urged Jiří Paroubek to resign as ČSSD leader, a response to Paroubek's appeal to some ODS politicians to quit politics.

Nečas held campaign events in multiple towns across the Czech Republic, meeting potential voters. ODS also featured Nečas heavily in its billboard campaign, launched in May 2010, which presented him as a candidate of "responsible politics".

Nečas attacked ČSSD over the election debate, criticising the fact that Paroubek had agreed to just three debates, and accusing him of avoiding a confrontation with him. The first head-to-head debate between Nečas and Paroubek was held on 12 April 2018, resulting in no clear winner, according to analysts. A second debate was held on 23 May 2010, also with no clear winner. The last debate was held on 26 May 2010, with journalists judging Nečas to have been better prepared and more confident than Paroubek, and the victor of the debate.

The party published campaign newspapers with the title Jasně ("Of Course"), introducing their policies and candidates.

ODS launched the final phase of its campaign, called "120 Hours for Victory", on 23 May 2010. Nečas said that ODS had to "stop Jiří Paroubek and the Communists". 120 Hours for Victory included performances by Czech singers such as Eva Pilarová, Helena Zeťová, Ivan Mládek, Tereza Kerndlová and Jitka Zelenková, attended by hundreds of party supporters. The party invited foreign politicians who came to the event to support ODS. The party was endorsed by British prime minister David Cameron and Slovak politician Iveta Radičová who both attended the event.

=== Czech Social Democratic Party (ČSSD) ===
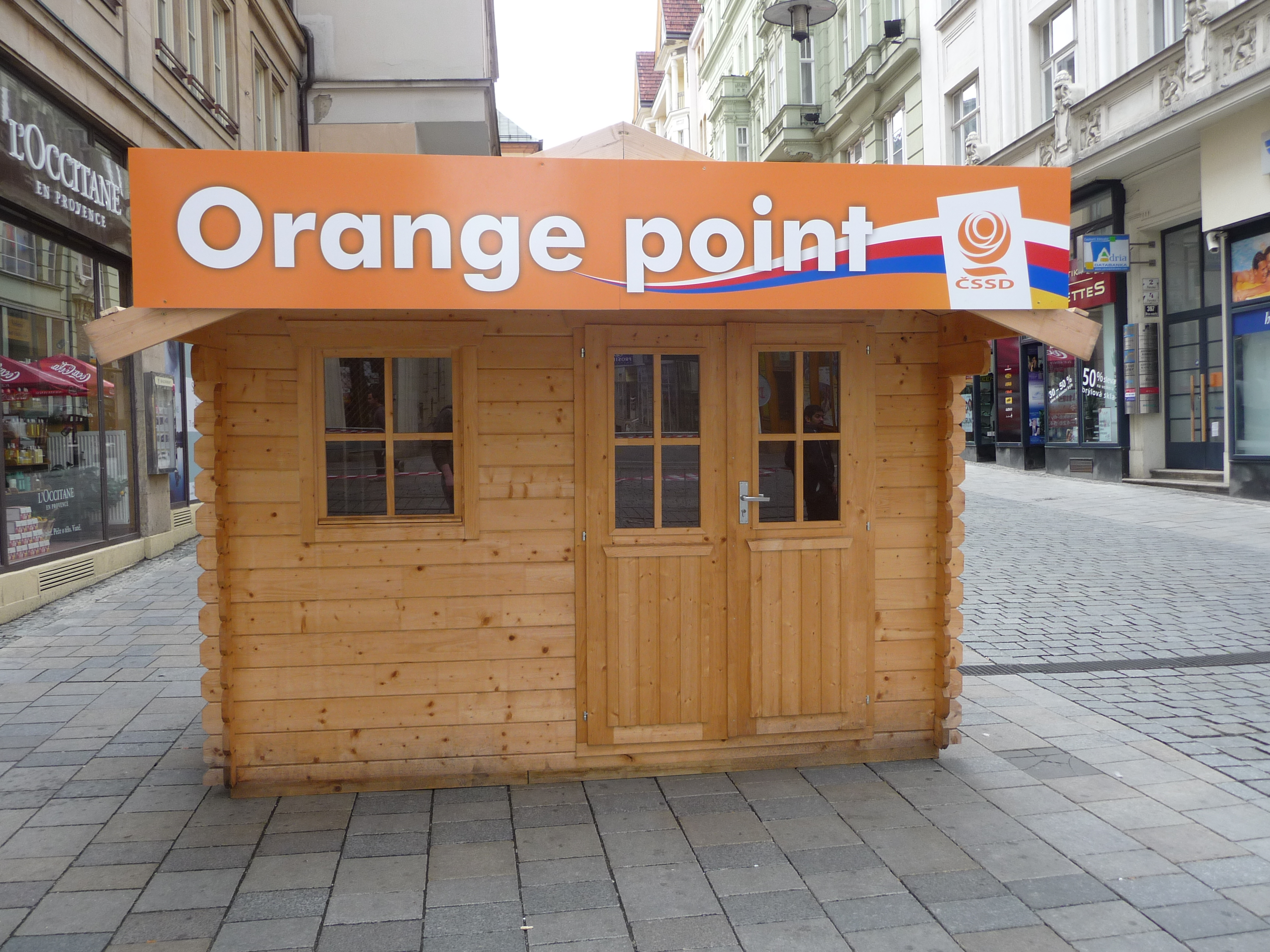
"Orange point" ČSSD kiosk in Brno

ČSSD was led into the election by former prime minister Jiří Paroubek. The party was considered the front-runner in the election and Paroubek was believed to be most likely to form the new government. The party's campaign slogans were "A better future for ordinary people" and "Change and Hope".

ČSSD launched their campaign on 22 April 2010. Paroubek stated that the party planned to restore economic growth. The party held large rallies in Czech towns, which ceased in May 2010 when ČSSD MP Bohuslav Sobotka was physically attacked by an opponent of the party. ČSSD politicians decided to meet voters at factories and schools instead. The party also put a lot of effort into a telephone campaign, in which ČSSD politicians phoned people to ask which party they were planning to vote for and ask them about their ideas.

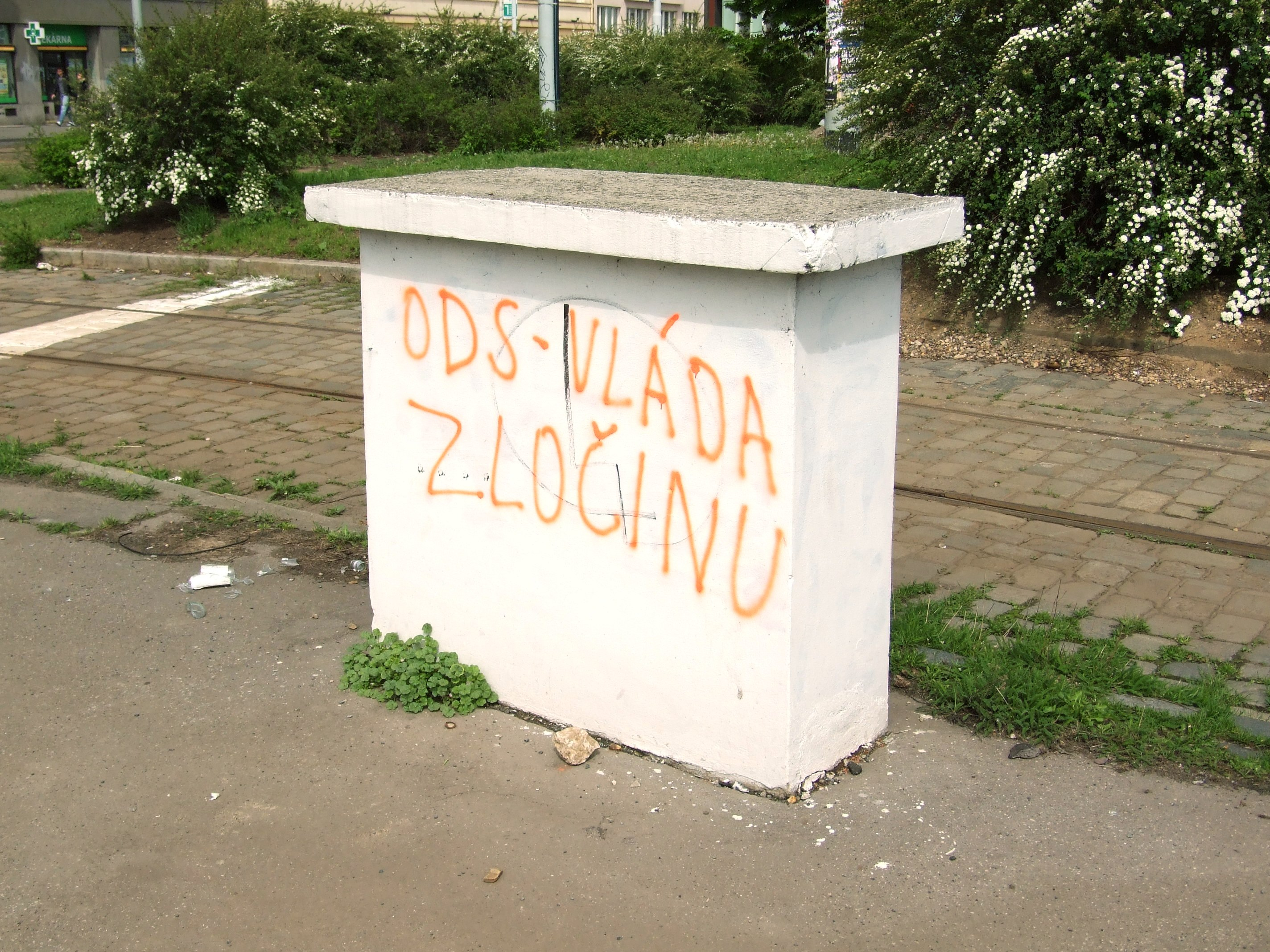
Anti-ODS graffiti in Prague

ČSSD made heavy use of negative campaigning directed as ODS and TOP 09, with half of their campaign billboards attacking those two parties. Slogans used on billboards included "Let's stop ODS and TOP 09 on 28 May" or "If you don't vote, you will pay by getting dismissed without cause." The party published campaign newspapers called Health Newspapers, attacking the healthcare plans of the two right-wing parties.

ČSSD concluded its campaign with the slogan "Work and Prosperity", and handed out 100,000 doughnuts at events for party supporters. ČSSD campaign manager Jaroslav Tvrdík stated that the party wanted to "make it more pleasant for people to wake up, and remind them why is voting important".

=== Communist Party of Bohemia and Moravia (KSČM) ===
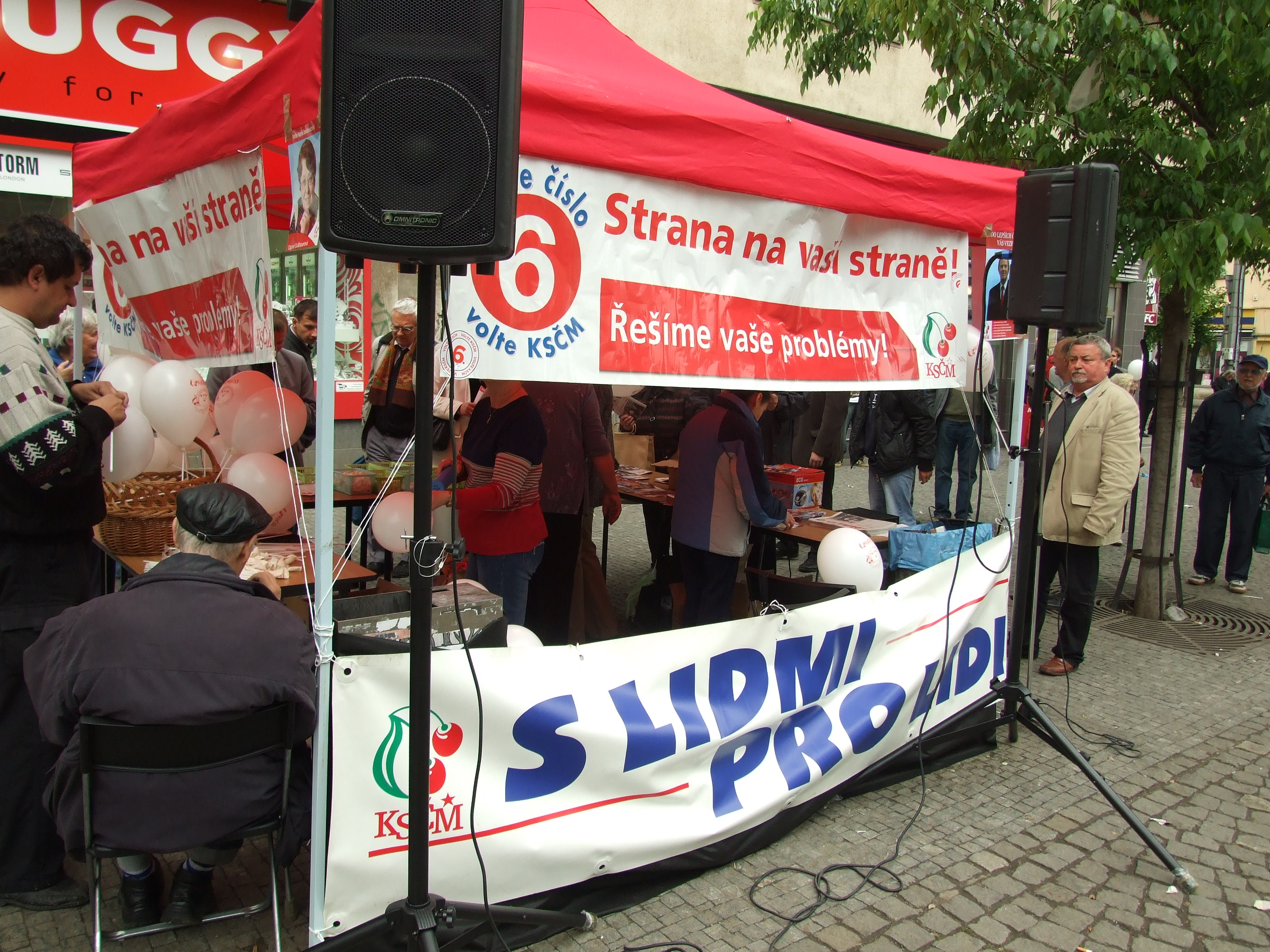
Communist party on Prague-Anděl

The Communist Party, led by Vojtěch Filip, ran a campaign focused on young voters, and held meetings with potential voters in town squares around the country, culminating in a huge rally on Náměstí Republiky, Prague. Younger party activists also attended meetings to attract young voters. The party's campaign used the slogan "With the People, For the People" and also featured celebrities who supported the party, such as singers Martin Maxa and Jana Kociánová.

=== TOP 09 ===
TOP 09 was founded by Miroslav Kalousek in June 2009. Karel Schwarzenberg was elected leader of the new party, and they entered a partnership with Mayors and Independents. TOP 09 decided to target conservative voters and began raising funds for their campaign, which was launched on 27 April 2010. Schwarzenberg promised a fight against corruption, healthcare reform, and moral renewal of the country. The party also attacked Public Affairs. The campaign, which was inspired by Barack Obama's 2008 presidential campaign, featured billboards using the slogan "more than you think".

=== Public Affairs (VV) ===
Public Affairs were led by author and journalist Radek John. The party launched its campaign on 20 April 2010, with John stating that he believed the party would receive more than 10% of votes. The party promised an end to "political dinosaurs" and promised to fight against corruption.

=== Christian and Democratic Union – Czechoslovak People's Party (KDU–ČSL) ===
KDU–ČSL, led by Cyril Svoboda, launched its campaign on 8 April 2010. The party had a shortage of campaign funding, and focused on a personal campaign, with party leaders visiting workplaces, social institutions and retirement homes. KDU-ČSL used the slogans "KDU-ČSL, the better in us" and "A good day is when ..."

=== Green Party (SZ) ===
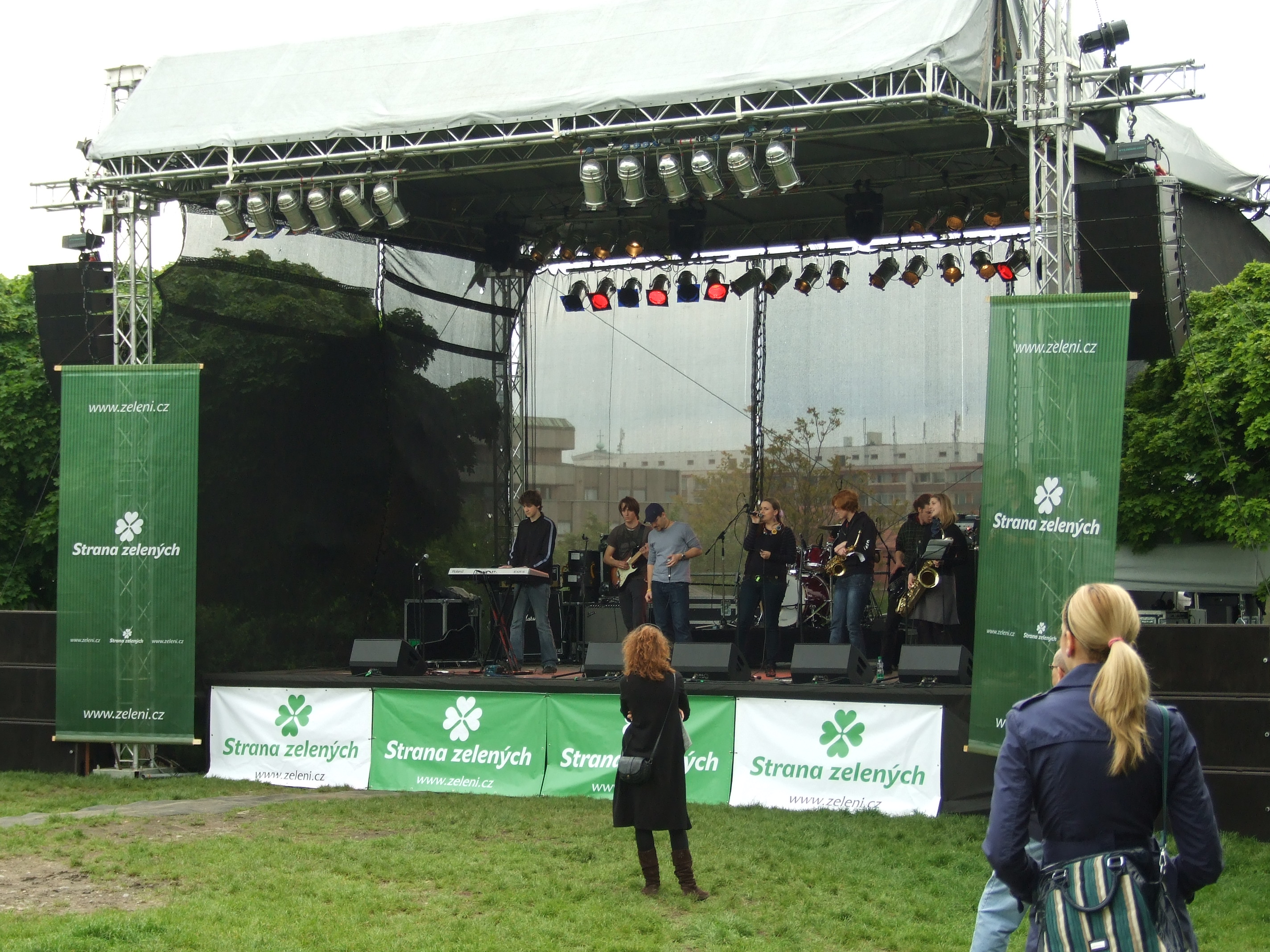
Czech Green Party campaign for 2010 elections

The Green Party, led by Ondřej Liška, launched its campaign on 27 April 2010, which featured prominent supporters of the party such as former president Václav Havel, Lenka Dusilová, and Meda Mládková.

The Greens focused heavily on communicating directly with citizens and their internet campaign. Liška stated that the Greens wanted to be different from the big parties and be "modest and sincere". The Greens considered TOP 09 and Public Affairs to be their main rivals. Their campaign focused on the environment and support for a healthy lifestyle, while also telling voters that their economic programme was good for the Czech Republic.

The party concluded its campaign by releasing three video adverts in which party supporters tried to convince people to vote for them.

=== Party of Civic Rights (SPOZ) ===
Party of Civic Rights was led by former prime minister Miloš Zeman, who stated that party's aim was to enter the Chamber of Deputies. Zeman used a bus called "Zemák" for his campaign.

=== Sovereignty – Party of Common Sense (Suverenita) ===
Sovereignty launched its campaign in January 2010, which focused heavily on leader Jana Bobošíková. The party used a campaign bus called Bobobus.

=== Independent initiatives ===
==== Defenestration 2010 ====
Defenestration 2010 was an independent initiative organised by František Janouch and Lenka Procházková, urging voters to use their preferential votes to help elect lesser known politicians, as they were "less likely to be involved in corruption".

==== Replace Politicians ====
Replace Politicians was an independent initiative supported by celebrities such as Dan Bárta, Aneta Langerová, Radek Banga, Viktor Preiss and David Koller, calling for voters to support smaller parties. The initiative held events and concerts, and the band Nightwork released a video clip to support the initiative.

=== Campaign finances ===
Party	Money spent	Campaign worth
ODS	213,000,000 Kč	192,885,423 Kč
ČSSD	184,124,000 Kč	333,084,552 Kč
VV	108,047,075 Kč	57,715,754 Kč
SPOZ	60,376,994 Kč	29,032,691 Kč
TOP 09	53,628,000 Kč	25,287,285 Kč
KDU-ČSL	50,000,000 Kč	3,795,362 Kč
SZ	12,737,573 Kč	1,658,820 Kč
KSČM	10,200,000 Kč	6,648,556 Kč
Suverenita	7,000,000 Kč	10,655,395 Kč
SSO	1,100,000 Kč	
ČPS	230,000 Kč	

== Television debates ==
The leaders of the two largest parties, Petr Nečas and Jiří Paroubek, appeared in four head-to-head debates. The first debate was organised by Česká televize in April 2010. The second was organised by Prima televize, and was a calm debate without personal attacks. The third debate was more aggressive and featured a number of personal attacks. The final debate was organised by Česká televize and was based on the format of debates organised by the BBC in the United Kingdom.

2010 Czech parliamentary election debates
Date	Organisers	P Present A Absent							
Date	Organisers	ODS	ČSSD	KSČM	TOP 09	VV	KDU–ČSL	SZ	SPOZ
12 April	Česká televize	P Nečas	P Paroubek	A	A	A	A	A	A
23 May	Prima televize	P Nečas	P Paroubek	A	A	A	A	A	A
25 May	Český rozhlas	A	A	P Filip	P Schwarzenberg	P John	P Svoboda	P Liška	P Zeman
26 May	Český rozhlas	P Nečas	P Paroubek	A	A	A	A	A	A
27 May	Česká televize	P Nečas	P Paroubek	A	A	A	A	A	A
Viewed as "the winner of debate"
Debate	Poll	ODS	ČSSD	KSČM	TOP 09	VV	KDU–ČSL	SZ	SPO
23 May; Prima televize	Ipsos Tambor	Nečas; 57%	Paroubek; 43%	A	A	A	A	A	A

== Opinion polls ==
Date	Polling Firm	ČSSD	ODS	TOP 09	KSČM	VV	KDU-ČSL	SZ	SPOZ	Others
28-29 May 2010	Election	22.1	20.2	16.7	11.3	10.9	4.4	2.4	4.3	7.7
Exit poll	SC&C	20.0	20.0	17.0	11.0	11.0	5.0	3.0	4.0	9.0
7–12 May 2010	Factum Invenio	26.3	22.9	10.9	13.1	12.6	5.5	2.5	2.6	3.6
3–10 May 2010	CVVM	30.5	19.0	14.0	13.0	11.5	3.5	4.5	2.0	2.0
28 April–4 May 2010	Sanep	29.9	22.3	10.1	12.9	9.8	4.7	2.8	5.5	2.0
2 Apr - 1 May 2010	Median	26.2	19.0	10.7	13.3	7.6	7.5	3.5	6.8	5.3
23–28 April 2010	Factum Invenio	27.5	21.7	11.1	13.9	11.0	5.2	2.9	3.2	3.5
13–28 April 2010	Médea Research	30.4	18.7	13.7	10.0	12.0	4.4	4.9	3.7	2.2
7–13 April 2010	Sanep	29.0	20.1	13.4	13.0	8.5	5.6	3.6	5.2	1.6
5–12 April 2010	CVVM	30.0	22.5	11.5	13.0	9.0	4.0	4.0	3.0	3.0
1–10 April 2010	STEM	27.8	18.6	9.3	9.9	8.1	4.9	3.2	3.1	15.2
3 - 9 Apr 2010	Factum Invenio	29.5	22.3	11.6	13.9	8.9	5.5	2.6	2.7	3.0
2 Mar - 30 Apr 2010	Median	27.0	21.2	7.5	16.8	4.3	7.4	4.8	—N/a	11.0
1 - 8 Mar 2010	CVVM	32.0	25.5	10.0	12.0	7.0	4.5	4.5	3.0	1.5
27 Feb - 8 Mar 2010	STEM	27.9	20.0	7.7	11.3	6.2	4.8	3.8	3.6	14.7
26 Feb - 3 Mar 2010	Factum Invenio	27.4	23.0	11.8	14.4	7.8	6.2	4.7	—N/a	4.7
7–13 April 2010	Sanep	29.0	20.1	13.4	13.0	8.5	5.6	3.6	5.2	1.6
2 - 3 Jun 2006	2006 Election	32.3	35.3	—N/a	12.8	—N/a	7.2	6.3	—N/a	6.1

== Results ==
The centre-left ČSSD won the most votes, with 22.1%. The conservative ODS and TOP 09 followed with 20.2% and 16.7% respectively. The Communist Party came fourth with 11.3%, ahead of the centre-right Public Affairs (VV) which received 10.9%. It was the first time that the Communists had finished lower than third in a Czech election. TOP 09 and VV won seats in Parliament for the first time. The KDU-ČSL (4.4%), the Party of Civic Rights (4.3%), the Green Party (2.4%), and Sovereignty (3.7%), failed to gain the 5% necessary to enter parliament. Voter turnout was 62.6% nationally, highest in Prague-West District (71.69%) and lowest in Sokolov District (50.89%). The results were a setback for the Czech Republic's largest parties, ČSSD and ODS. President Václav Klaus said that the results would cause a "fundamental weakening" of the two parties.

Party	Votes	%	Seats	+/–
Czech Social Democratic Party	1,155,267	22.09	56	–18
Civic Democratic Party	1,057,792	20.22	53	–28
TOP 09	873,833	16.71	41	New
Communist Party of Bohemia and Moravia	589,765	11.27	26	0
Public Affairs	569,127	10.88	24	New
KDU-ČSL	229,717	4.39	0	–13
Party of Civic Rights – Zemanovci	226,527	4.33	0	New
Sovereignty – Party of Common Sense	192,145	3.67	0	New
Green Party	127,831	2.44	0	–6
Workers' Party of Social Justice	59,888	1.14	0	New
Czech Pirate Party	42,323	0.81	0	New
Party of Free Citizens	38,894	0.74	0	New
Right Bloc	24,750	0.47	0	0
Citizens.cz	13,397	0.26	0	New
Moravané	11,914	0.23	0	0
Conservative Party	4,232	0.08	0	New
Koruna Česká	4,024	0.08	0	0
STOP	3,155	0.06	0	New
Rally for the Republic – Republican Party of Czechoslovakia	1,993	0.04	0	0
Czech National Socialist Party	1,371	0.03	0	0
Key Movement	1,099	0.02	0	New
Humanist Party	552	0.01	0	0
European Centre	522	0.01	0	New
Czech National Social Party	295	0.01	0	0
Liberálové.CZ	260	0.00	0	0
National Prosperity	186	0.00	0	New
Total	5,230,859	100.00	200	0
Valid votes	5,230,859	99.37		
Invalid/blank votes	32,963	0.63		
Total votes	5,263,822	100.00		
Registered voters/turnout	8,415,892	62.55		
Source: Czech Statistical Office

=== Vote share by district ===
CSSD

ODS

TOP 9

KSCM

VV

=== By region ===
Winning parties by region

Winning parties by district

Voter turnout by district

==== Prague ====
Party	Votes	%	Seats
TOP 09	173,840	27.28	8
Civic Democratic Party	158,014	24.79	8
Czech Social Democratic Party	96,706	15.17	4
Public Affairs	65,742	10.32	3
Communist Party of Bohemia and Moravia	41,647	6.53	2
Green Party	30,528	4.79	0
Party of Civic Rights – Zemanovci	19,851	3.11	0
Other parties	51,000	8.00	0
Total	637,328	100.00	25

==== Central Bohemian Region ====
Party	Votes	%	Seats
Civic Democratic Party	150,465	23.88	7
Czech Social Democratic Party	129,368	20.53	6
TOP 09	110,865	17.59	5
Communist Party of Bohemia and Moravia	69,368	11.01	3
Public Affairs	67,601	10.73	3
Sovereignty – Party of Common Sense	27,430	4.35	0
Party of Civic Rights – Zemanovci	23,235	3.69	0
Other parties	51,871	8.23	0
Total	630,203	100.00	24

==== South Bohemian Region ====
Party	Votes	%	Seats
Civic Democratic Party	71,173	21.37	4
Czech Social Democratic Party	68,468	20.55	3
TOP 09	57,937	17.39	3
Communist Party of Bohemia and Moravia	40,738	12.23	2
Public Affairs	35,541	10.67	1
Party of Civic Rights – Zemanovci	13,736	4.12	0
KDU-ČSL	12,558	3.77	0
Sovereignty – Party of Common Sense	12,523	3.76	0
Other parties	20,443	6.14	0
Total	333,117	100.00	13

==== Plzeň Region ====
Party	Votes	%	Seats
Czech Social Democratic Party	61,688	22.01	3
Civic Democratic Party	59,253	21.14	3
TOP 09	47,584	16.98	2
Communist Party of Bohemia and Moravia	35,077	12.52	2
Public Affairs	27,378	9.77	1
Party of Civic Rights – Zemanovci	11,605	4.14	0
KDU-ČSL	6,820	2.43	0
Other parties	30,859	11.01	0
Total	280,264	100.00	11

== Aftermath ==
After the election results were announced, Jiří Paroubek resigned as ČSSD leader, citing disappointment with the outcome, and saying that "it seems that people have chosen the direction the republic should go in and it is a different direction than the one ČSSD were offering". ČSSD had led comfortably in polling before the election, and its 22% share of the vote was a significant drop from the party's 32% in the 2006 election. Paroubek conceded that a conservative coalition government was likely.

KDU-ČSL failed to enter the parliament for the first time in the party's history. Party leader Cyril Svoboda admitted disappointment, and took responsibility for the result, resigning as leader on 6 June 2010. Michaela Šojdrová became acting leader.

The Green Party also dropped out of the Chamber of Deputies. Party leader Ondřej Liška resigned and announced a snap leadership election.

=== Government formation ===
ODS, TOP 09 and VV had all committed to government spending cuts, raising the prospect of the formation of a fiscally conservative cabinet. The leaders of the three parties held coalition talks shortly after the results were published. ODS leader Petr Nečas said that the three parties had a "common will" to form a government, stating that their financial plans would work together to help the country avoid a crisis similar to the one affecting Greece at the time. Negotiations between the three parties about the formation of a new government started on 2 June 2010, and the parties signed a proclamation to continue negotiations.

After extensive talks regarding the terms of the coalition, Nečas was appointed prime minister on 28 June 2010. Public Affairs held a referendum among party members to decide whether to join the new government. The result was announced on 12 July 2018, with 2,912 members voting in favour and 815 against. The coalition agreement was signed on the same day.
