= Alliance for the Independence of the Czech Republic =

Electoral alliance in Czech Republic

Alliance for the Independence of the Czech Republic Aliance za nezávislost ČR
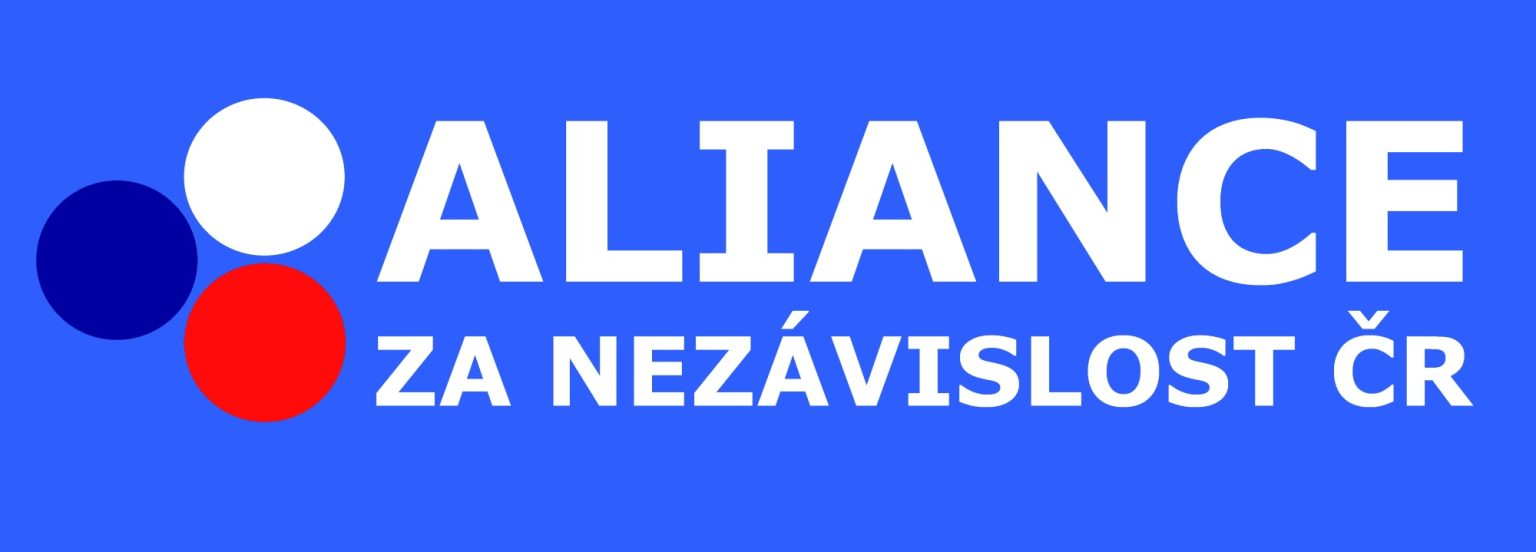
- Leader: Hynek Blaško
- Founded: 28 October 2023
- Dissolved: 8 June 2024
- Ideology: Ultranationalism; Hard Euroscepticism
- Political position: Far-right
- European Parliament group: Identity and Democracy Group
- Member parties: National Democracy; Alliance of National Forces; Party of Common Sense; Workers' Party of Social Justice; Clean Region; Safe Streets
- European Parliament: 0 / 21

Website
- https://aliancezacr.cz

Alliance for the Independence of the Czech Republic (Czech: Aliance za nezávislost ČR) was a Czech far-right and ultranationalist electoral alliance formed for the 2024 European Parliament election. The alliance was formed in October 2023 and was led by a MEP and a former general of the Czech army Hynek Blaško.

== Policies ==
The alliance supported the withdrawal of Czech Republic from the European Union and NATO, was opposed to Green Deal and international migration and advocated for a political neutrality. It hoped to terminate the Czech membership in NATO by writing a letter addressed to the President of the United States Joe Biden, citing Article 13 of the North Atlantic Treaty. Several diplomats commented their efforts as "ridiculous" and the Czech Minister of Foreign Affairs Jan Lipavský have reaffirmed the importance of the membership in a reaction to the letter.

In pre-electoral interview, Blaško reaffirmed the exit from EU and NATO as priorities, together with the alliance's opposition to international migration and the Euro. He also claimed that efforts to abolish unanimous voting in the European Council are "a terrible thing" and said that if he got reelected, he would try to rejoin the Identity and Democracy Group.

== Composition ==
Parties	Main ideology	Leader(s)	List composition
Alliance of National Forces	Nationalism	Vladimíra Vítová	12 / 28
National Democracy	Ultranationalism	Jan Sedláček	5 / 28
Workers' Party of Social Justice	Neo-Nazism	Tomáš Vandas	5 / 28
Party of Common Sense	Nationalism	Petr Hannig	4 / 28
Clean Region	Local politics	Milan Poláček	1 / 28
Safe Streets	Local politics	Hana Pavlíčková	1 / 28

== Election results ==
=== 2024 European Parliament Election ===
Election	List leader	Votes	%	Seats	+/−	EP Group
2024	Hynek Blaško	14,910	0.50 (#12)	0 / 21	New	−
