= Opinion polling for the 2016 Czech regional elections =

Nationwide public opinion polls

This page lists nationwide public opinion polls that have been conducted relating to the 2016 regional elections in the Czech Republic.

== Jihomoravský kraj (South Moravian region) ==
Polling firm	Date	ČSSD	KSČM	KDU- ČSL	ANO 2011	ODS	TOP 09	STAN	SN	SZ	PIR	SPO SPD	SVO	SsČR	ÚSV	Others
election 2012	12–13 October 2012	27.0	18.7	17.0	—	9.2	5.9		3.9	3.7	2.5	2.5	1.4	0.2	—	7.0
Sanep	15–31 July 2015	23.2	15.1	15.6	13.4	7.8	5.1	—	2.1	2.1	2.2	3.2	3.1	—	0.1	7.0
Sanep	27 October - 10 November 2015	23.5	15.3	15.2	14.8	8.1	4.7	1.2	—	2.6	—	3.0	3.4	—	0.8	7.4
Sanep	6–16 January 2016	23.2	15.7	14.9	14.9	8.7	4.7	1.1	—	2.5	—	3.1	3.5		0.9	6.8
Sanep	8–18 March 2016	23.4	15.9	15.1	14.3	9.2	4.2	1.0	—	2.7		3.3	3.9		0.9	6.1
Phoenix Research		25.5	12.0	15.7	12.4	9.0	3.5	3.3	—	2.4		4.3	5.8		1.2	4.9
SANEP	18–28 May 2016	23.8	16.8	15.2	14.9	9.3	3.8	n/a	n/a	3.2		4.4	5.2		—	4.2
Sanep	14–24 July 2016	18.2- 23.6	13.1- 16.8	12.3- 15.9	12.9- 18.5	8.1- 11.5	4.4- 6.7	—	—	2.4- 5.1		4.4- 6.7	3.1- 5.6		—	

== Moravskoslezský kraj (Moravia-Silesia region) ==
Polling firm	ČSSD	ANO 2011	KSČM	KDU-ČSL	NEZ	ODS	PIRÁTI	TOP 09	SPD	STAN	ÚSVIT	SNK-MS	Others
Sanep 15–31 July 2015	23.9	19.7	19.5	8.1	5.8	4.2	3.2	4.3	1.0	—	0.1	1.8	8.4
Sanep 27 October - 10 November 2015	23.7	19.8	19.7	7.8	5.9	4.3	3.8	3.6	1.2	1.1	0.9	—	8.2
Sanep 6–16 January 2016	23.2	20.3	19.9	7.5	6.1	4.9	3.9	3.1	1.2	1.0	0.9	-	8.0
Sanep 8–18 March 2016	23.3	19.7	20.1	7.2	6.8	6.4	4.0	2.1	1.4	0.9	0.8	n/a	7.3
Phoenix Research	25.3	17.1	18.4	10.0	n/a	8.4	1.1	2.9	1.0	5.2	2.4	n/a	7.1

== Olomoucký kraj (Olomouc region) ==
Polling firm	ČSSD	ANO 2011	KSČM	KDU-ČSL	KpOKS	ODS	TOP 09	SPD	DSSS	PIRÁTI	NEZ	NV	SSO	ÚSVIT	STAN	Others
Sanep 15–31 July 2015	19.9	19.9	19.1	6.1	—	5.8	5.2	3.3	3.1	2.9	2.6	2.4	2.1	0.3	—	7.3
Sanep 27 October - 10 November 2015	16.1	21.9	19.2	—	8.2	5.9	5.1	3.9	3.4	3.1	—	—	—	1.4	1.2	10.6
Sanep 6–16 January 2016	16.4	21.7	19.5	-	8.5	6.3	4.8	3.6	3.3	3.2	-	-	-	1.6	1.2	9.9
Sanep 8–18 March 2016	19.8	19.5	19.1	-	8.9	6.6	4.6	3.7	3.1	3.4	-	-	-	1.4	1.2	8.7

== Zlínský kraj (Zlín region) ==
Polling firm	ANO 2011	ČSSD	KDU-ČSL	KSČM	TOP 09	ODS	SSO	SPO	STAN	SPD	DSSS	ÚSVIT	Others
Sanep 15–31 July 2015	19.1	18.7	16.9	15.1	6.3	4.8	—	4.3	3.1	2.8	1.9	0.2	6.8
Sanep 27 October - 10 November 2015	19.0	16.9	17.1	14.7	5.6	4.5	4.5	4.1	3.4	2.5	—	0.7	7.0
Sanep 6–16 January 2016	18.3	16.5	18.9	14.9	4.8	4.9	6.6	4.1	3.5	2.6	-	0.8	4.1
Sanep 8–18 March 2016	17.2	16.2	18.8	15.1	4.2	4.8	9.2	4.2	3.8	2.9	-	0.5	3.1

== Královéhradecký kraj (Hradec Králové region) ==
Polling firm	ANO 2011	KSČM	ČSSD	KpKHK	TOP 09	ODS	VČ	SNK ED	SPD	SSO	PIRÁTI	ÚSVIT	ZpKHK	Others
Sanep 15–31 July 2015	16.7	15.8	12.9	11.7	7.1	6.8	6.6	4.3	4.3	2.8	1.3	0.2	—	9.5
Sanep 27 October - 10 November 2015	17.1	15.2	14.5	11.9	5.9	7.1	6.4	4.1	5.1	—	—	0.8	3.2	8.7
Sanep 6–16 January 2016	17.0	15.1	14.8	12.3	5.1	7.3	6.1	4.0	5.2	3.1	-	0.9	3.3	5.8
Sanep 8–18 March 2016	16.3	14.8	14.5	12.8	4.1	9.8	2.8	-	5.3	5.6	5.3	1.3	3.1	4.3

== Pardubický kraj (Pardubice region) ==
Polling firm	ČSSD	ANO 2011	KpPK	KSČM	ODS	NEZ	SPO	TOP 09	DSSS	PIRÁTI	SPD	ÚSVIT	VČ	STAN	Others
Sanep 15–31 July 2015	18.9	18.1	17.3	14.8	7.1	5.0	4.9	4.2	2.8	2.1	0.5	0.1	—	—	4.2
Sanep 27 October - 10 November 2015	17.0	17.2	17.4	14.8	7.1	3.4	4.0	4.1	3.2	—	0.6	1.1	3.2	0.6	6.3
Sanep 6–16 January 2016	17.1	17.2	17.5	14.6	7.2	-	3.7	4.0	-	-	0.5	1.2	3.1	0.6	9.4
Sanep 8–18 March 2016	17.3	16.4	17.8	14.8	7.8	n/a	3.8	4.9	n/a	n/a	0.9	1.0	3.0	0.5	6.6

== Středočeský kraj (Central Bohemian region) ==
Polling firm	ČSSD	KSČM	ANO 2011	TOP 09	ODS	PIRÁTI	SSO	KDU-ČSL	K	SZ	STAN	SPD	ÚSVIT	Others
Sanep 15–31 July 2015	19.1	16.1	15.9	9.9	7.1	4.6	3.7	3.5	—	2.8	2.6	1.9	0.1	12.7
Sanep 27 October - 10 November 2015	18.9	15.8	18.2	8.9	8.2	4.8	3.9	—	4.2	2.9	2.5	1.7	1.8	8.2
Sanep 6–16 January 2016	18.6	15.9	18.1	7.1	8.7	4.7	4.5	-	4.9	2.6	2.3	1.9	2.0	8.7
Sanep 8–18 March 2016	18.7	15.9	16.4	5.2	10.4	n/a	5.0	n/a	7.7	n/a	2.2	2.1	2.3	8.8

== Kraj Vysočina (Vysočina region) ==
Polling firm	ČSSD	KSČM	ANO 2011	KDU-ČSL	PV	ODS	TOP 09	STO	PIRÁTI	SPD	ÚSVIT	STAN	Others
Sanep 15–31 July 2015	22.9	16.5	16.1	12.2	7.8	5.2	4.3	3.5	3.1	1.5	0.1	—	6.8
Sanep 27 October - 10 November 2015	21.5	15.2	17.1	11.2	7.9	6.3	4.0	3.6	3.4	1.8	0.6	2.1	5.3
Sanep 6–16 January 2016	21.8	15.8	16.5	11.6	8.1	6.5	3.2	3.3	3.3	1.5	0.7	1.9	5.8
Sanep 8–18 March 2016	21.4	15.9	16.1	11.8	8.4	6.8	3.0	3.5	3.8	1.8	0.4	1.4	5.7

== Plzeňský kraj Plzeň region) ==
Polling firm	ANO 2011	ČSSD	KSČM	ODS	TOP 09	KpPlK	SNK-MS	SSO	PIRÁTI	KDU-ČSL	SPD	ÚSVIT	STAN	Others
Sanep 15–31 July 2015	19.1	17.5	15.4	9.9	6.5	5.9	4.5	4.2	3.6	2.7	1.4	0.2	—	9.1
Sanep 27 October - 10 November 2015	19.3	17.1	16.7	9.1	7.1	6.2	4.5	4.5	3.7	—	1.1	0.8	1.9	8.0
Sanep 6–16 January 2016	19.1	17.4	16.8	9.3	6.9	6.8	4.3	4.9	3.9	-	1.0	0.9	1.8	6.9
Sanep 8–18 March 2016	18.3	17.9	16.1	9.5	8.1	7.8	n/a	5.8	4.8	n/a	1.4	0.3	2.1	7.9

== Jihočeský kraj (South Bohemian region) ==
Polling firm	ČSSD	ANO 2011	KSČM	JIH12	KDU-ČSL	ODS	TOP 09	PIRÁTI	SSO	SPD	ÚSVIT	STAN	Others
Sanep 15–31 July 2015	21.7	16.7	16.6	12.2	6.9	6.1	5.7	3.8	3.2	0.8	0.2	—	6.1
Sanep 27 October - 10 November 2015	21.4	17.4	16.8	12.6	6.9	6.3	5.1	3.8	3.6	0.9	1.2	1.7	2.3
Sanep 6–16 January 2016	20.9	17.8	16.7	12.8	7.1	6.1	4.5	3.9	3.8	0.8	1.3	1.5	2.3
Sanep 8–18 March 2016	20.2	17.1	16.3	12.3	6.9	8.7	4.7	4.1	3.9	0.9	1.2	1.4	2.3

== Karlovarský kraj (Karlovy Vary region) ==
Polling firm	ANO 2011	KSČM	ČSSD	A	KpKvK	TOP 09	ODS	SPD	PIRÁTI	DSSS	SSO	KDU-ČSL	ÚSVIT	STAN	HNHRM	Others
Sanep 15–31 July 2015	18.4	17.1	15.3	10.2	5.9	5.2	5.1	3.9	3.8	3.5	2.1	1.8	0.1	—	—	7.6
Sanep 27 October - 10 November 2015	17.9	17.5	15.1	10.3	6.1	4.9	5.3	4.1	3.9	3.9	—	—	0.9	1.2	—	8.9
Sanep 6–16 January 2016	17.1	17.8	15.7	10.6	4.1	5.6	4.2	4.0	3.8	-	-	-	0.8	1.1	—	8.7
Sanep 8–18 March 2016	16.2	17.6	15.8	7.6	4.2	n/a	5.5	4.2	4.2	3.1	3.1	n/a	1.2	n/a	6.9	6.3

== Ústecký kraj (Ústí nad Labem region) ==
Polling firm	ANO 2011	KSČM	ČSSD	S.cz	PRO!	ODS	TOP 09	SPD	PIRÁTI	SSO	KDU-ČSL	DSSS	ÚSVIT	STAN	Others
Sanep 15–31 July 2015	21.1	20.3	18.1	—	9.1	5.1	5.1	3.2	3.2	2.7	2.2	2.1	0.3	—	7.5
Sanep 27 October - 10 November 2015	19.6	20.5	18.0	9.1	8.2	5.2	3.7	3.5	3.7	—	—	—	1.2	0.2	7.1
Sanep 6–16 January 2016	19.6	20.1	18.1	9.2	8.1	3.1	3.6	3.6	3.0	-	-	-	1.3	0.2	4.4
Sanep 8–18 March 2016	18.2	20.7	17.5	10.4	9.2	4.6	3.5	3.7	3.9	3.1	n/a	n/a	1.6	0.2	3.4

== Liberecký kraj (Liberec region) ==
Polling firm	ANO 2011	KSČM	SLK	ČSSD	ZMĚNA	ODS	TOP 09	DSSS	SNK-MS	SPD	KDU-ČSL	PIRÁTI	ÚSVIT	STAN	Others
Sanep 15–31 July 2015	17.8	14.1	12.7	12.3	11.6	7.1	6.5	4.3	4.1	3.4	1.8	1.0	0.2	—	3.1
Sanep 27 October - 10 November 2015	17.9	14.3	12.8	11.6	11.4	7.2	5.9	4.7	4.0	3.5	1.7	—	0.8	0.6	3.6
Sanep 6–16 January 2016	17.6	14.5	12.9	11.9	11.8	7.5	5.1	4.7	4.1	3.4	1.8	-	0.9	0.7	3.1
Sanep 8–18 March 2016	14.9	14.9	15.1	10.4	12.1	7.8	4.8	4.1	4.8	3.5	1.7	n/a	1.4	0.6	3.9
