= 2016 Liberec regional election =

← 2012	7–8 October 2016	2020 →

All 45seats in the Assembly 23 seats needed for a majority
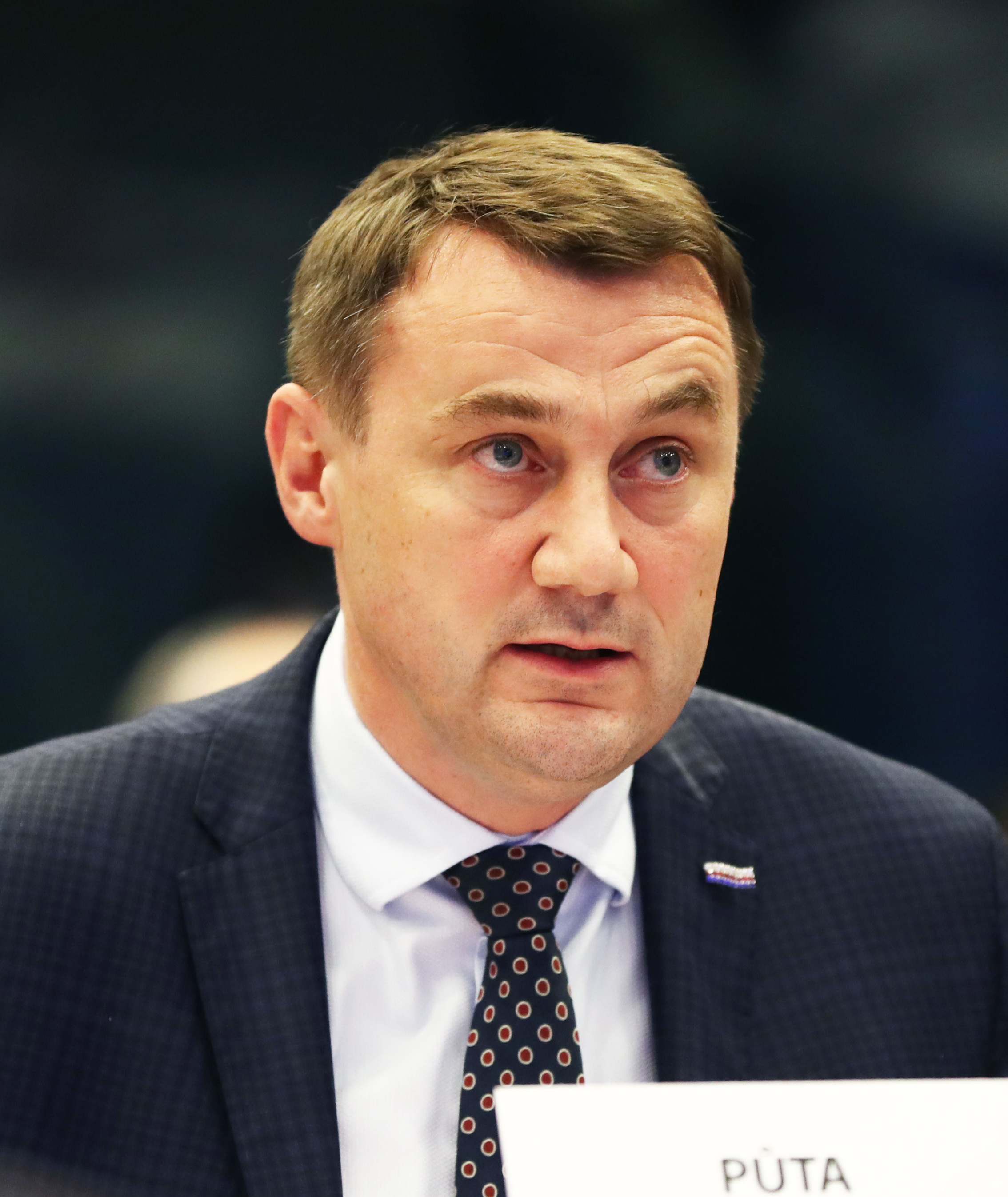

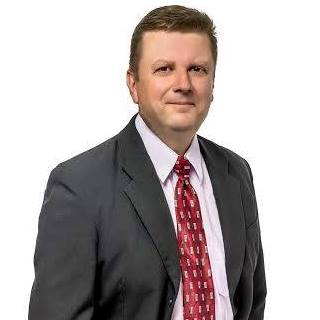
	First party	Second party	Third party
Leader	Martin Půta	Jitka Volfová	Stanislav Mackovík
Party	SLK	ANO	KSČM
Seats won	18	9	4
Popular vote	40,058	21.156	10,039
Percentage	32.3%	17.1%	8.1%
	Fourth party	Fifth party	Sixth party
Leader	Pavel Svoboda	Dan Ramzer	Jan Korytář
Party	ČSSD	ODS	Change
Seats won	4	4	4
Popular vote	2,273,722	9,803	8,744
Percentage	11.0%	7.9%	7.1%
	Seventh party
Leader	Radovan Vích
Party	SPD
Alliance	SPD–SPO
Seats won	2
Popular vote	6,448
Percentage	5.2%
Governor before election
Martin Půta
SLK
Elected Governor
Martin Půta
SLK

Liberec regional election in 2016 was held as part of 2016 regional elections. It was a surprising victory of Mayors for Liberec Region (SLK) led by Martin Půta. Půta faced accusations of corruption prior election. Půta remained Governor of Liberec region. SLK formed coalition with ANO 2011, ODS and ČSSD.

== Opinion polls ==
Polling firm	ANO 2011	KSČM	SLK	ČSSD	ZMĚNA	ODS	TOP 09	DSSS	SNK-MS	SPD	KDU-ČSL	PIRÁTI	ÚSVIT	STAN	Others
Sanep 15–31 July 2015	17.8	14.1	12.7	12.3	11.6	7.1	6.5	4.3	4.1	3.4	1.8	1.0	0.2	—	3.1
Sanep 27 October - 10 November 2015	17.9	14.3	12.8	11.6	11.4	7.2	5.9	4.7	4.0	3.5	1.7	—	0.8	0.6	3.6
Sanep 6–16 January 2016	17.6	14.5	12.9	11.9	11.8	7.5	5.1	4.7	4.1	3.4	1.8	—	0.9	0.7	3.1
Sanep 8–18 March 2016	14.9	14.9	15.1	10.4	12.1	7.8	4.8	4.1	4.8	3.5	1.7	—	1.4	0.6	3.9
Sanep 18–28 May 2016	14.3	14.7	13.9	10.2	14.2	7.2	4.1	—	—	6.8	—	—	—	—	11.2
Election 7–8 October 2016	17.1	8.1	32.3	8.0	7.1	7.9	3.4	0.6	2.9	5.2	2.9	3.3	1.1	—	2.9

== Results ==
Party	Votes	%Votes	Seats
Mayors for Liberec Region	40,058	32.35	18
ANO 2011	21,156	17.08	9
Communist Party of Bohemia and Moravia	10,039	8.10	4
Czech Social Democratic Party	9,961	8.04	4
Civic Democratic Party	9,803	7.91	4
ZMĚNA	8,744	7.06	4
Freedom and Direct Democracy-Party of Civic Rights	6,448	5.20	2
TOP 09	4,236	3.42	0
Czech Pirate Party	4,048	3.26	0
Future for Liberec Region and KDU-ČSL	3,612	2.92	0
Freeholders and Free Citizens	2,380	1.92	0
Dawn - National Coalition	1,397	1.12	0
Others	1,935	1.53	-
