= Party of Common Sense =

Rozumní Rozumní
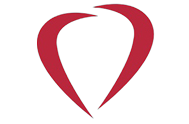
- Abbreviation: Rozumní
- Founder: Petr Hannig
- Founded: 5 March 2002
- Dissolved: 15 December 2024
- Ideology: Nationalism; Euroscepticism; Anti-immigration; Anti-Islam
- Political position: Right-wing to far-right
- Colours: White; Red; Blue

Rozumní, formerly known as the Party of Common Sense (Czech: Strana zdravého rozumu) was a Czech nationalist political party, founded in 2002 by Petr Hannig. It was dissolved in 2024.

== History ==
The party was founded in 2002 by Petr Hannig. The party received 0.2% of the vote in the 2002 Czech parliamentary election, failing to reach the 5% threshold for representation. This increased to 0.5% of the vote in the 2006 election.

In 2009, the party began collaborating with former Eurosceptic MEP Jana Bobošíková, her party Politika 21, and other independent candidates. This electoral alliance ran in the 2009 European election under the name 'Sovereignty', led by Bobošíková. The list came fifth, winning 4.3% of the vote, just short of the 5% threshold for representation.

In 2010, the party changed its name to Sovereignty – Party of Common Sense (Suverenita – Strana zdravého rozumu), and won 3.7% in the 2010 election, again falling short of parliamentary representation. The cooperation between the two parties subsequently ended, and the party returned to its original name in 2014.

The party was dissolved in 2024.

== Election results ==
=== Chamber of Deputies ===
Year	Vote	Vote %	Seats
2002	10 849	0.22	0 / 200
2006	24 828	0.46	0 / 200
2010	192 145	3.67	0 / 200
2013	13 538	0.27	0 / 200
2017	36,528	0.72	0 / 200

=== European Parliament ===
Election	List leader	Votes	%	Seats	+/−	EP Group
2004	Unclear	6,316	0.27 (#17)	0 / 21	New	−
2009	Did not contest			0 / 21	0	−
2014	Petr Hannig	24,724	1.63 (#11)	0 / 21	0	−
2019 (Note: Run in a joint list with ND.)	Adam B. Bartoš	18,715	0.79 (#12)	0 / 21	0	−
2024 (Note: Run as part of the Alliance for the Independence of the Czech Republic.)	Hynek Blaško	14,910	0.50 (#12)	0 / 21	0	−

=== Presidential ===
Election	Candidate	First round result			Second round result		
Election	Candidate	Votes	%Votes	Result	Votes	%Votes	Result
2018	Petr Hannig	29,228	0.57	8th place			
