= Alliance of National Forces (Czech Republic) =

Alliance of National Forces Aliance národních sil
- Abbreviation: ANS
- Founder: Ludvík Adámek
- Founded: 4 July 2011
- Dissolved: 28 October 2024
- Headquarters: Chudenická 1059/30; 102 00 Prague
- Ideology: Social conservatism Nationalism; Euroscepticism; Russophilia; Anti-immigration; Anti-Islam
- Political position: Far-right
- Colours: White; Red; Blue

Website
- aliancenarodnichsil.cz

The Alliance of National Forces (Czech: Aliance národních sil; ANS) was a Czech political party. It was established in 2011 under the name Citizens 2011 and its first chair was Ludvík Adámek. The party ran in the 2013 legislative election only in Prague. On June 2, 2018, Vladimíra Vítová was registered as chair, and on July 2, 2018, the party was renamed the Alliance of National Forces. The party was dissolved in 2024.

== Position ==
According to its website, the Alliance of National Forces supported the Czech Republic's withdrawal from NATO and the European Union, the "traditional family", the nationalization of strategic sectors of the national economy and natural resources (water and minerals), and the abolition of church restitution. The party opposed "migration planned by the European Union", "modern slavery of multinational companies and debt collections", the repeal of the Beneš decrees, and "efforts to liquidate the Czech state".

The first website of the Alliance of National Forces featured Karel Janko, chair of the Czech National Socialist Party, Zbyněk Štěpán, chair of National Prosperity, and Vladimíra Vítová, chair of the Czech Peace Forum. The website also listed 13 advisers and consultants, including three former Czech Social Democratic Party ministers (Jaroslav Bašta, Ivan David and Eduard Zeman).

== Electoral history ==
=== 2019 European Parliament election ===
The party participated in the 2019 European Parliament election, with Jiří Černohorský as the lead candidate. The party received 1,971 votes (0.08%) and did not win any seats.

=== 2020 Czech Senate election ===
The party participated in the 2020 Senate election, but did not have any senators elected. After the election, the party lodged a complaint with the Supreme Administrative Court to invalidate the election due to unequal access to the media. The Supreme State Court rejected the complaint, stating that "balance and equal treatment in these contexts cannot be understood mechanically as absolute equality of candidates, but from the point of view of so-called graduated equality".

=== 2021 Czech Chamber of Deputies election ===
The party participated in the 2021 Czech parliamentary election, with Vladimíra Vítová as the lead candidate. The party received 5,167 votes (0.10%) and did not win any seats.

=== 2023 Czech presidential election ===
The party endorsed Freedom and Direct Democracy candidate Jaroslav Bašta in the 2023 Czech presidential election, who came fifth with 248,375 votes (4.45%).

=== 2024 European Parliament election ===
The party participated in the 2024 European Parliament election as a part of the Alliance for the Independence of the Czech Republic coalition, with Hynek Blaško as the lead candidate. Others running for ANS on this list included former member of the Chamber of Deputies Miroslav Sládek and other members of his Rally for the Republic – Republican Party of Czechoslovakia.

== Election results ==
=== Chamber of Deputies ===
Election	Leader	Votes	%	Seats	+/–	Government
2013	Ludvík Adámek	455	0.01 (#22)	0 / 200		Extra-parliamentary
2017	Ludvík Adámek	359	0.00 (#29)	0 / 200	0	Extra-parliamentary
2021	Vladimíra Vítová	5,166	0.09 (#18)	0 / 200	0	Extra-parliamentary

=== European Parliament ===
Election	List leader	Votes	%	Seats	+/−	EP Group
2014	Petra Benešová	1,299	0.08 (#30)	0 / 21	New	−
2019	Jiří Černohorský	1,971	0.08 (#32)	0 / 21	0	−
2024 (Note: Run as part of the Alliance for the Independence of the Czech Republic.)	Hynek Blaško	14,910	0.50 (#12)	0 / 21	0	−
