= Workers' Party (Czech Republic) =

Former political party

Workers' Party Dělnická strana
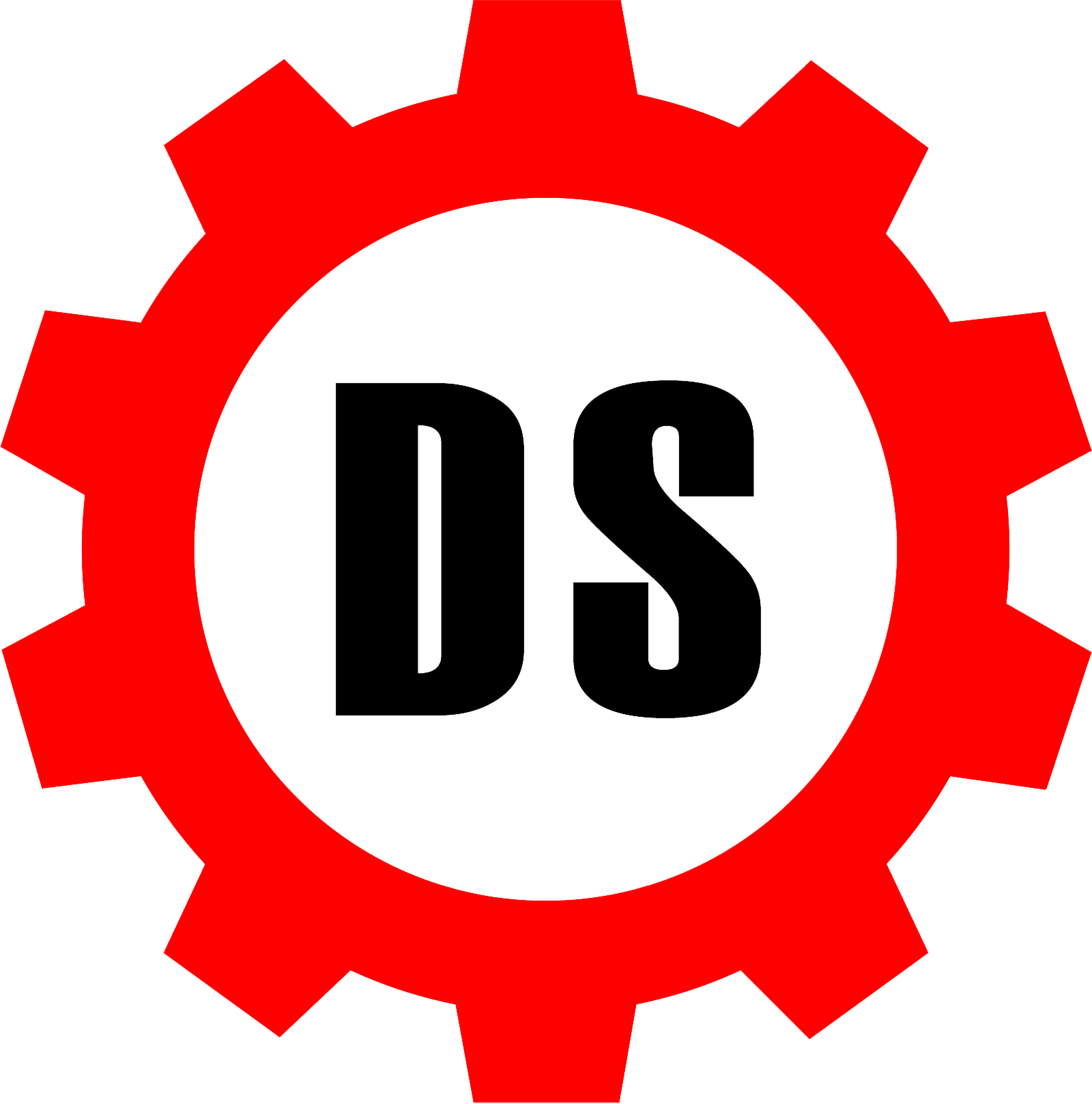
- Leader: Tomáš Vandas
- Founded: 18 January 2003
- Banned: 17 February 2010
- Split from: Republicans of Miroslav Sládek
- Succeeded by: Workers' Party of Social Justice
- Ideology: Neo-Nazism; Czech nationalism Anti-Romanyism; Anti-immigration; Anti-communism; Antisemitism
- Political position: Far-right

The Workers' Party (Czech: Dělnická strana) was a Czech far-right, extremist, and neo-Nazi political party, founded by Tomáš Vandas in 2003. In 2010, it was banned, making it the first instance of a political party being abolished for its ideology in the modern history of the Czech Republic. Its representatives, including Vandas, subsequently shifted their membership to the Workers' Party of Social Justice (Czech: Dělnická strana sociální spravedlnosti), founded in 2004.

The decision of the Supreme Administrative Court is a very important message for the entire Czech society. It is a message stating that the Czech Republic does not tolerate extremism. – Martin Pecina, Minister of the Interior of the Czech Republic

== Election results ==
European Parliament

Year	# of total votes	Vote %	Seats
2004	4,289	0.18	0
2009	25,368	1.07 ▲	0
