= National Democracy (Czech Republic) =

National Democracy Národní demokracie
- Abbreviation: ND
- Chairman: Jan Sedláček
- Deputy Leader: Miroslav Šafář
- Founder: Jiří Matzner
- Founded: March 2, 1994; 31 years ago
- Headquarters: U tržnice 1979; 272 01 Kladno
- Youth wing: National Youth
- Ideology: Czech nationalism Ultranationalism; National conservatism Hard Euroscepticism
- Political position: Far-right
- Colors: Blue

Website
- narodnidemokracie.cz

National Democracy (Czech: Národní demokracie, short ND) is a national conservative and eurosceptic political party in the Czech Republic. The party was founded in 1994 as "Law and Justice – Yes to traditional family, No to corruption and criminality" (Czech: Právo a Spravedlnost – ANO tradiční rodině, NE korupci a kriminalitě) or simply the "Law and Justice", inspired by Polish party Prawo i Sprawiedliwość.

On 11 January 2014, the party transformed into "No To Brussels – National Democracy", to bruit continuity with first Prime Minister of Czechoslovakia, Karel Kramář, and his Czechoslovak National Democracy.

For the 2019 European Parliament election the party announced a united list with the Party of Common Sense.

In April 2019 the party signed a cooperation agreement with the Liberal Democratic Party of Russia.

== Election results ==
=== Presidential ===
Election	Candidate	First round result			Second round result		
Election	Candidate	Votes	%Votes	Result	Votes	%Votes	Result
2018	Petr Hannig	29,228	0.56	8th place			

=== European Parliament ===
Election	List leader	Votes	%	Seats	+/−	EP Group
2019 (Note: Run in a joint list with Rozumní.)	Adam B. Bartoš	18,715	0.78 (#12)	0 / 21	New	−
2024 (Note: Run as part of the Alliance for the Independence of the Czech Republic.)	Hynek Blaško	14,910	0.50 (#12)	0 / 21	0	−
