= Workers' Party of Social Justice =

Workers' Party of Social Justice Dělnická strana sociální spravedlnosti
- Abbreviation: DSSS
- Founder: Jan Broj
- Founded: 29 January 2004; 22 years ago
- Dissolved: 19 October 2024; 18 months ago
- Preceded by: Workers' Party (since 2010)
- Merged into: Safe Streets
- Headquarters: Ciolkovského 853/1; 161 00 Prague
- Newspaper: Workers' List
- Youth wing: Workers' Youth
- Paramilitary wing: Civic Guards
- Ideology: Czech nationalism; Neo-Nazism; Social conservatism; Antiziganism
- Political position: Far-right
- Colours: White; Red; Blue

Website
- www.dsss.cz

The Workers' Party of Social Justice (Czech: Dělnická strana sociální spravedlnosti) was a Czech militant far-right political party, which existed from 2004 to 2024. In 2010, the party, under its original name of the Workers' Party, was banned by the Czech Supreme Administrative Court, becoming the first party since the re-establishment of democracy in the Czech Republic to be banned on ideological grounds. The party subsequently changed its name to the Workers' Party of Social Justice.

The party's program contained strict social conservative and anti-internationalist policies, and called for the overthrow of liberal democracy in the Czech Republic. The party was never represented in any legislative body in the country, and its highest vote-share was 1.14% in the Czech legislative election in 2010.

== History ==
The party was formed in 2004 and received less than 1% of the vote in its first election, but shortly afterwards attracted significant media attention for organizing riots in quarters of Litvínov with a significant Roma population. The party gained subsequent publicity by organizing a march against LGBT people in Tábor.

In March 2009 a petition by the Czech Government to ban the Workers' Party was dismissed by the Czech Supreme Administrative Court, with the presiding judge ruling that the applicant had not provided sufficient evidence, in what was seen as a botched application. Following violent attacks against Czech minorities by far-right extremists, such as the Vítkov arson attack of 2009, the government filed a more detailed petition for the ban. After discussion by the Czech Supreme Court in January and February 2010, the party was banned, marking the first instance of a party being banned for its ideology in the modern history of the Czech Republic. The party was transformed into a "Party of Citizens of the Czech Republic", and the renamed as the Workers' Party of Social Justice, retaining its program with small adjustments.

== Program ==
The party's program called for the overthrow and subversion of the Czech political system, which the party described both as "liberal" and "totalitarian". Its official slogan for the 2009 European elections was: "Resist the totalitarian regime". Some high-ranking party officials, including a Prague party leader, were associated with neo-Nazi groups such as Národní odpor, the Czech subsidiary of an international militant neo-Nazi group.

The party's program included reducing national debt while increasing old age pensions and reducing the retirement age. Concrete proposals included restrictions on foreign investment, including a total ban on purchases of real estate by foreign nationals, and nationalization of certain companies.

The party also wanted to restore the death penalty, criminalize "sexual deviation", including homosexuality, abolish registered partnership, reduce the rights of criminal defendants, and in some cases create new crimes with a retroactive effect. Some of the most controversial proposals included marking of ethnicity in ID cards, and giving the police discretion to treat arrestees inhumanely.

In international affairs, the party opposed NATO and the European Union, and demanded that the Czech Republic leave those organizations. The party was strongly anti-American and pro-Russian, stating that the Czech Republic must "immediately and strongly restore its relations with Russia". The chairman of the party arbitration commission congratulated Mahmoud Ahmadinejad of Iran after his victory in the 2009 presidential election.

== Election results ==
=== Czech legislative election ===
Year	# of total votes	Vote %	Seats
2010	59,888	1.14 (10)▲	0
2013	42,906	0.86 (12)▼	0
2017	10,402	0.20 (16) ▼	0

=== European Parliament ===
Election	List leader	Votes	%	Seats	+/−	EP Group
2014 (Note: Run in a joint list with SPE.)	Tomáš Vandas	7,902	0.52 (#15)	0 / 22	New	−
2019 (Note: Run in a joint list with NF.)	Tomáš Vandas	4,363	0.18 (#23)	0 / 22	0	−
2024 (Note: Run as part of the Alliance for the Independence of the Czech Republic.)	Hynek Blaško	14,910	0.50 (#12)	0 / 22	0	−
