= Mayors for the Liberec Region =

Mayors for the Liberec Region Starostové pro Liberecký kraj
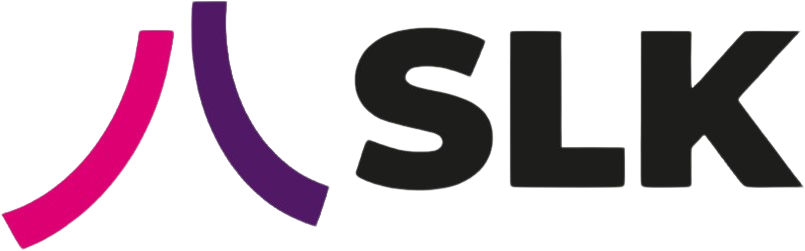
- Abbreviation: SLK
- Leader: Martin Půta
- Founded: 2008; 18 years ago
- Headquarters: Liberec
- Ideology: Liberec regionalism Subsidiarity; Pro-Europeanism
- Political position: Centre-right
- Colours: Purple
- Chamber of Deputies: 2 / 200
- Senate: 3 / 81
- European Parliament: 0 / 21
- Liberec regional council: 22 / 45
- Local councils: 109 / 62,300

Website
- starostoveprolibereckykraj.cz

Mayors for the Liberec Region (Czech: Starostové pro Liberecký kraj, SLK) is a regionalist party in the Czech Republic, established ahead of the 2008 regional elections. The party won the 2012 regional election in Liberec and its leader Martin Půta became governor of the Liberec Region, the first time a governor had come from outside one of the major parties. SLK cooperates with the Mayors and Independents party.

== Ideology ==
The party focuses on regional issues. It supports economical responsibility, transparency and flood repairs. SLK were critical of the coalition between the Czech Social Democratic Party (ČSSD) and SOS that governed the region in 2008–2012. SLK criticised the coalition for corruption and slow repairs to roads damaged by floods.

== History ==
SLK was established in 2008 and participated in regional elections that year, receiving just under 14% and forming part of the opposition in the regional assembly. SLK participated in the 2010 legislative election, with its members nominated by TOP 09. SLK member Jan Farský was elected as a member of parliament.

Martin Půta led SLK into the 2012 regional elections and won over 20% of votes, with Půta becoming Governor of the region. In 2016 he again led the party into elections, winning over 30% of votes.

== Election results ==
=== Chamber of Deputies ===
Year	Party	Candidates	Seats
2010	TOP 09	5	2
2013	TOP 09	6	1
2017	STAN	9	0

=== Senate ===
==== Česká Lípa ====
Year	Candidate	First round		Second round		Results
Year	Candidate	Votes	%Votes	Votes	%Votes	Results
2014	Jiří Vosecký	6,633	20.14	8,246	59.32	Elected
2020	Jiří Vosecký	10,418	29.59	6,988	52.87	Re-elected
2026	Martin Půta	14 052	32,66	14 287	55,75	Elected

==== Jablonec nad Nisou ====
Year	Candidate	First round		Second round		Results
Year	Candidate	Votes	%Votes	Votes	%Votes	Results
2012	Soňa Paukrtová	4,406	11.73	-	-	Eliminated

==== Liberec ====
Year	Candidate	First round		Second round		Results
Year	Candidate	Votes	%Votes	Votes	%Votes	Results
2016	Michael Canov	18,698	45.30	16,579	80.18	Elected

=== European Parliament ===
Election	List leader	Votes	%	Seats	+/−	EP Group
2024 (Note: Run in a joint list with STAN.)	Danuše Nerudová	258,431	8.70 (#5)	0 / 22	New	−

=== Regional assembly ===
Year	Votes	%Votes	Seats	Position
2008	17,878 (4th)	13.78%	7 / 45	Opposition
2012	28,763 (1st)	22.21%	13 / 45	Council
2016	40,058 (1st)	32.35%	18 / 45	Council
2020	53,546 (1st)	38.57%	22 / 45	Council
