= 2009 TOP 09 leadership election =

- 28 November 2009
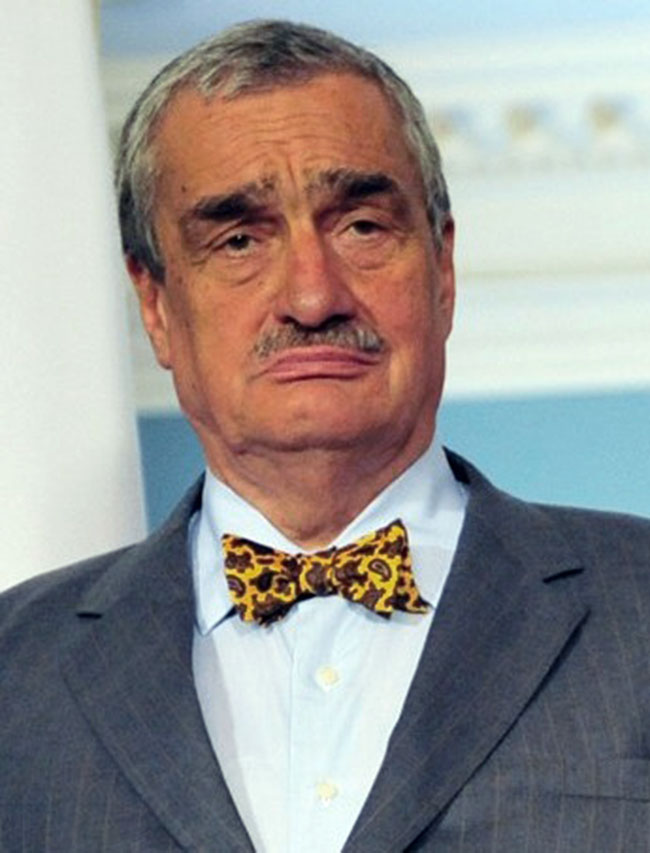
Nominee	Karel Schwarzenberg
Party	TOP 09
Electoral vote	163
Percentage	99.4%
Elected Leader of TOP 09
Karel Schwarzenberg

The first leadership election was held in the TOP 09 party in the Czech Republic on 28 November 2009. Karel Schwarzenberg became party's leader.

== Background ==
During 2009, Miroslav Kalousek left Christian and Democratic Union – Czechoslovak People's Party and decided to form a new party called TOP 09 He managed to attract some personas from other parties. It included Senator Karel Schwarzenberg who was speculated to be a possible candidate for party's leader.

== Results ==
Party's assembly was held on 28 November 2009. Schwarzenberg was introduced as the only candidate for the leader of TOP 09. 164 delegates were allowed to vote, including Schwarzenberg. Schwarzenberg refused to vote in the election and received 163 votes. Schwarzenberg became icon of the party and many delegates looked up to him with much admiration.

Candidate	Votes	%
Karel Schwarzenberg	163	99.4
Invalid	1	0.6
Total	164	100
