= 2010 Green Party (Czech Republic) leadership election =

- 14 November 2010
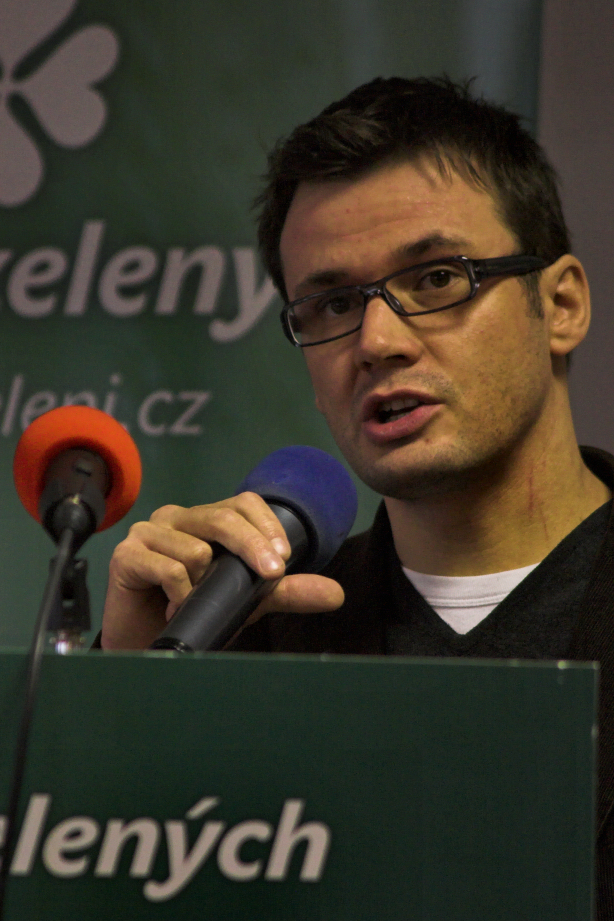

| Candidate | Ondřej Liška | Karel Helman | Giuseppe Maiello |
| Electoral vote | 125 | 35 | 27 |
| Percentage | 63.8% | 17.9% | 13.8% |
Leader of Greens before election
Ondřej Liška
Elected Leader of Greens
Ondřej Liška

The Green Party (SZ) leadership election of 2010 was held on 14 November 2010. Ondřej Liška was elected for his second term when he received 125 votes of 209.

== Voting ==
There were 4 Candidates besides Ondřej Liška - Karel Helman, Martin Marek, Giuseppe Maiello and Ivana Kyselková. 209 Delegates voted. Liška received 125 votes while Helman 35 and Maiello 27 votes. Marek received 5 votes and Kyselková 4.

| Candidate | Votes | |
|---|---|---|
| Ondřej Liška | 125 | 63.78% |
| Karel Helman | 35 | 17.86% |
| Giuseppe Maiello | 27 | 13.78% |
| Martin Marek | 5 | 2.55% |
| Ivana Kyselková | 4 | 2.04% |
