= Czech nationalism =

Ideology promoting the nation and cultural unity of the Czech people

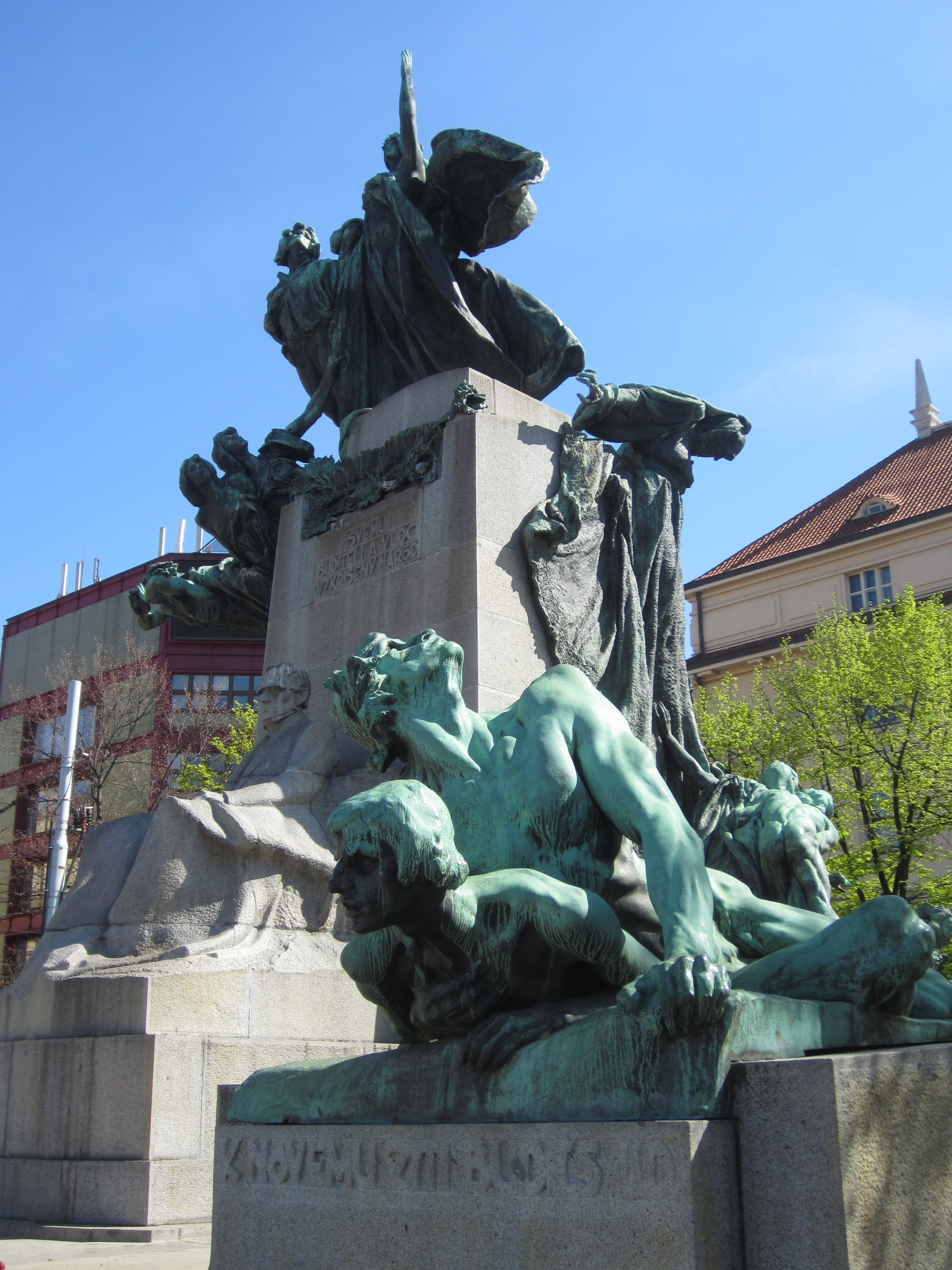
Monument of František Palacký in Prague, nicknamed Father of the Nation, considered to be father of Czech nationalism

Czech nationalism is a form of nationalism which asserts that Czechs are a nation and promotes the cultural unity of Czechs. Modern Czech nationalism arose in the 19th century in the form of the Czech National Revival. In 1848, Czech nationalism became an important political factor in the Austrian Empire due to the activities of the Old Czech Party, led by František Palacký. During World War I, Czech nationalist politicians, such as Karel Kramář in the Czech lands and Tomáš Garrigue Masaryk abroad, endorsed the idea of independence from Austro-Hungarian rule.

After 1918 and the creation of Czechoslovakia, the absolute majority of Czech politicians and society adopted Czechoslovakism, that is, the notion of a unified state including Slovakia.

The transformation of Czechoslovakia into a liberal market economy during the years 1990-1992 saw disputes between Czechs and Slovaks about the character of the Czechoslovak federation. Separatist forces were strengthened by Slovak nationalist aspirations as well as by Czech economic nationalism, the latter based on the perception that the Czech lands were subsidizing less-developed Slovakia. Czechoslovakia was divided into the Czech Republic and Slovakia, with the Czech Republic becoming independent on 1 January 1993.

== List of Czech nationalist political parties ==
=== Current nationalist parties or parties with nationalist factions (2024) ===
==== Far-right ====
- Freedom and Direct Democracy
- National Democracy

==== Right-wing ====
- ANO 2011
- Přísaha
- Tricolour Citizens' Movement
- Civic Democratic Party
- Svobodní
- Law, Respect, Expertise
- Motorists for Themselves

==== Left-wing ====
- Stačilo!
- Communist Party of Bohemia and Moravia
- Czech Sovereignty of Social Democracy
- Czech National Social Party

== See also ==
- Czechs
- Czech Republic
- Czech National Revival
- Czechoslovakism
