= Tomáš Vandas =

Czech politician (born 1969)

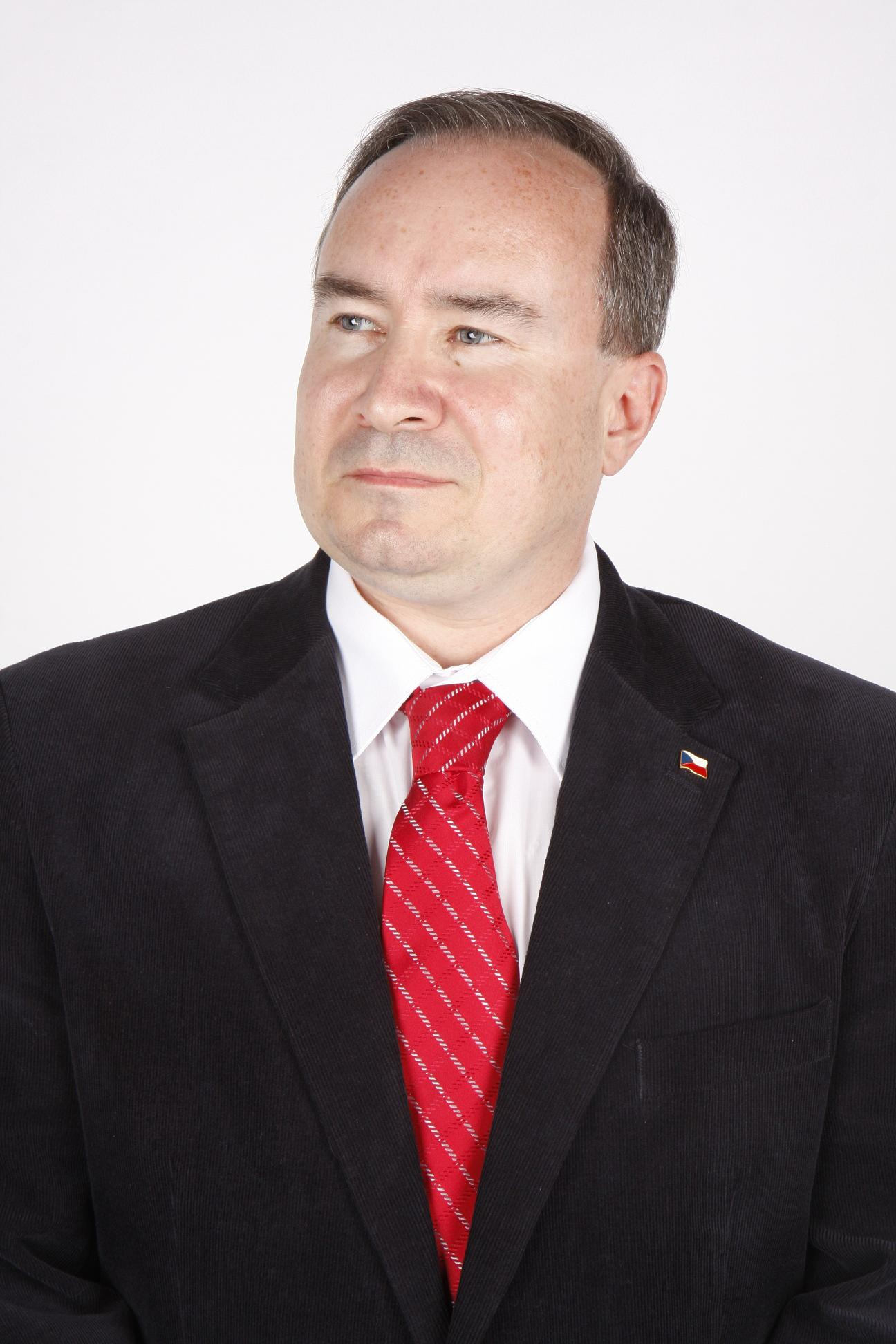

Chairman of Workers' Party
- In office 31 May 2003 – 17 February 2024
- Preceded by: Jiří Štěpánek
- Succeeded by: Office abolished

Personal details
- Born: 3 March 1969 (age 57) Prague, Czechoslovakia
- Party: SPR–RSČ (1995–2003); Workers' Party (2003–2010); DSSS (2010–2024)
- Profession: Quality manager, politician
- Website: http://www.tomasvandas.cz

Tomáš Vandas (Czech pronunciation: [ˈtomaːʃ ˈvandas]; born 3 March 1969) is a Czech far-right politician, who was the leader of the non-parliamentary Workers' Party of Social Justice from 2003 until its dissolution in 2024.

== Education and occupation ==
Vandas was born in Prague. Having completed a plumbing course, he continued his education at the High School of Industrial Technology. He is a graduate of the Jan Amos Komensky University of Prague, where he achieved a bachelor's degree in social and mass communication.

== Political career ==
Vandas began his political activism in 1995. From 1997-98 he worked for the Coalition for Republic - Republican Party of Czechoslovakia, initially as an assistant to an MP, and later as a member of the party's audit committee. After the parliamentary elections in 1998 he became general secretary to SPR-RSČ. In 2003 he was a founding member of the Workers' Party, and was its chairman from 31 May 2003 until 17 February 2010, when the party was prohibited by the Czech Supreme Administrative Court.

Vandas stood in the senate elections in 2010 but was unsuccessful, receiving 5.13% of the vote. In March 2012, Vandas announced his intention to run for Czech president in the 2013 direct presidential elections, but failed to collect the required 50,000 signatures. In the 2022 municipal elections, he was elected to the city council of Bílina as the leader of the 'Clean and Safe Bílina' list.
