= Hynek Blaško =

Czech politician (born 1955)

Hynek Blaško MEP
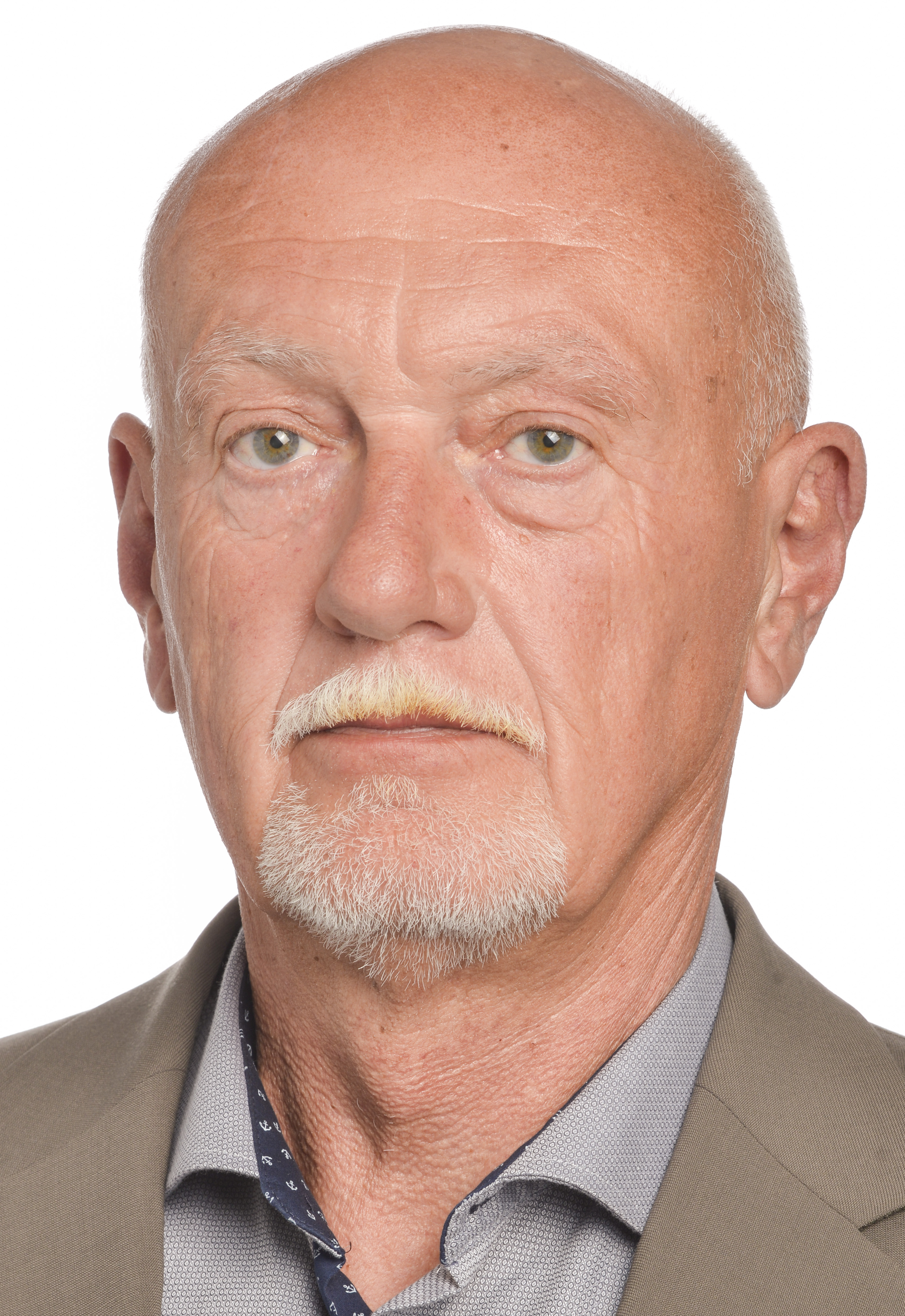

Member of the European Parliament for Czech Republic
- In office 2 July 2019 – 15 July 2024

Personal details
- Born: 15 July 1955 (age 71) Prague, Czechoslovakia
- Party: Communist Party of Czechoslovakia (1981–1989); Freedom and Direct Democracy (2019–2022)
- Education: Military Academy in Brno
- Website: blasko-prezident23.cz

Hynek Blaško (born 15 July 1955 in Prague) is a Czech general and politician who was elected as a Member of the European Parliament in 2019.

On 14 September 2022 Blaško left Freedom and Direct Democracy due to disagreement with functioning of the party.

On 15 September 2022, he was one of 16 MEPs who voted against condemning President Daniel Ortega of Nicaragua for human rights violations, in particular the arrest of Bishop Rolando Álvarez.

== 2023 Czech presidential election ==
On 27 May 2022 Blaško announced his intention to run for the office of President of the Czech Republic in the 2023 election. His presidential bid received support from DSSS. Blaško eventually failed to gather enough signatures and withdrew from the election.
