= List of heads of state and government who have visited Ukraine during the Russo-Ukrainian war (2022–present) =

Map of serving heads who have visited Ukraine since the Russian invasion

A number of foreign leaders have visited Ukraine during the Russian invasion, meeting president of Ukraine Volodymyr Zelenskyy and other officials, and visiting areas around the country. This list only includes heads of state and government that visited Ukraine while in office. Heads of state and government may have visited Ukraine in honor of the anniversary of the Russian invasion or for other occasions, such as Holodomor, International Chernobyl Disaster Remembrance Day, Constitution Day, Statehood Day, Day of the National Flag, or Independence Day.

== List ==
State	Head of state and/or government	Date(s) of visit(s)	Details of visit(s)	References
Albania	Edi Rama	2022-06-15		
Albania	Bajram Begaj	2026-07-15	The 5th Ukraine-Southeast Europe Summit	
Australia	Anthony Albanese	2022-07-03–2022-07-04	Albanese became the first Australian prime minister and Oceanian leader to make a diplomatic visit to Ukraine.	
Austria	Karl Nehammer	2022-04-09	Nehammer was the first leader of a neutral country to visit Ukraine during the invasion. Two days later, he became the first European leader to visit Russia during the invasion.	
Austria	Alexander Van der Bellen	2023-02-01		
Belgium	Alexander De Croo	2022-11-26		
Belgium	Alexander De Croo	2024-02-24		
Belgium	Bart De Wever	2025-04-08		
Bulgaria	Kiril Petkov	2022-04-28		
Bulgaria	Nikolai Denkov	2024-02-26		
Bulgaria	Rosen Zhelyazkov	2025-06-11		
Bulgaria	Andrey Gyurov	2026-03-30		
Bosnia and Herzegovina	Željko Komšić	2023-08-23		
Canada	Justin Trudeau	2022-05-08	Trudeau was the first non-European and North American leader to visit Ukraine during the invasion.	
Canada	Justin Trudeau	2023-06-10		
Canada	Justin Trudeau	2024-02-24		
Canada	Justin Trudeau	2025-02-24	Trudeau opened a summit on peace and security, and pledged military and monetary aid to Ukraine.	
Canada	Mark Carney	2025-08-24		
Croatia	Andrej Plenković	2022-05-08		
Croatia	Andrej Plenković	2023-03-31		
Croatia	Andrej Plenković	2024-09-11		
Croatia	Andrej Plenković	2025-06-11		
Croatia	Andrej Plenković	2026-02-24	Visited on the 4-year anniversary of Russia's full-scale invasion	
Croatia	Andrej Plenković	2026-07-15	The 5th Ukraine-Southeast Europe Summit	
Czech Republic	Petr Fiala	2022-03-15		
Czech Republic	Petr Fiala	2022-10-31		
Czech Republic	Petr Pavel	2023-04-28		
Czech Republic	Petr Pavel	2025-03-20–2025-03-21		
Czech Republic	Petr Pavel	2026-01-15–2026-01-16		
Comoros	Azali Assoumani	2023-06-16		
Cyprus	Nikos Christodoulides	2025-12-04	The first visit of the Cypriot Head of State to Ukraine since the beginning of Russia's full-scale invasion, and the last time a President of Cyprus visited Ukraine was ten years ago	
Denmark	Mette Frederiksen	2022-04-21		
Denmark	Mette Frederiksen	2023-01-30		
Denmark	Mette Frederiksen	2023-09-06		
Denmark	Mette Frederiksen	2024-02-23		
Denmark	Mette Frederiksen	2024-11-19	Visited on the 1,000th day of Russia's full-scale invasion	
Denmark	Mette Frederiksen	2025-02-24		
Denmark	Mette Frederiksen	2026-02-24	Visited on the 4-year anniversary of Russia's full-scale invasion	
Denmark	Mette Frederiksen	2026-08-23	Visited for Ukraine's national flag day.	
Egypt	Mostafa Madbouly	2023-06-16		
Estonia	Alar Karis	2022-04-13		
Estonia	Alar Karis	2023-06-02		
Estonia	Alar Karis	2024-09-12		
Estonia	Alar Karis	2026-08-23-2026-08-24		
Estonia	Kaja Kallas	2023-04-24		
Estonia	Kristen Michal	2024-12-09		
Estonia	Kristen Michal	2025-02-24		
Estonia	Kristen Michal	2026-02-24	Visited on the 4-year anniversary of Russia's full-scale invasion	
Finland	Sanna Marin	2022-05-26		
Finland	Sanna Marin	2023-03-10		
Finland	Sauli Niinistö	2023-01-24		
Finland	Petteri Orpo	2023-08-23		
Finland	Petteri Orpo	2025-05-28		
Finland	Petteri Orpo	2026-10-22		
Finland	Alexander Stubb	2024-04-03		
Finland	Alexander Stubb	2025-02-24		
Finland	Alexander Stubb	2025-09-11		
Finland	Alexander Stubb	2026-02-24	Visited on the 4-year anniversary of Russia's full-scale invasion	
Finland	Alexander Stubb	2026-08-23-2026-08-24	Visited for Ukraine's national flag day.	
France	Emmanuel Macron	2022-06-16		
France	Emmanuel Macron	2025-05-10		
Germany	Olaf Scholz	2022-06-16		
Germany	Olaf Scholz	2024-12-02		
Germany	Frank-Walter Steinmeier	2022-10-25		
Germany	Friedrich Merz	2025-05-10		
Germany	Friedrich Merz	2026-10-04		
Greece	Katerina Sakellaropoulou	2022-11-03		
Greece	Kyriakos Mitsotakis	2024-03-06	Russia launched a missile attack that landed approximately 500 to 800 metres (0.31 to 0.50 mi) from the delegation while visiting Odesa.	
Greece	Kyriakos Mitsotakis	2025-06-11		
Guatemala	Alejandro Giammattei	2022-07-25	Giammattei was the first Latin American leader to visit Ukraine during the invasion.	
Guinea-Bissau	Umaro Sissoco Embaló	2022-10-26	Embaló, who is also Chairman of the Economic Community of West African States (ECOWAS), was the first African leader to visit Ukraine during the invasion.	
Honduras	Nasry Asfura	2026-06-19		
Hungary	Katalin Novak	2022-11-26		
Hungary	Katalin Novak	2023-08-22		
Hungary	Viktor Orbán	2024-07-02		
Iceland	Katrín Jakobsdóttir	2023-03-14		
Iceland	Kristrún Frostadóttir	2025-02-24		
Iceland	Kristrún Frostadóttir	2026-02-24	Visited on the 4-year anniversary of Russia's full-scale invasion	
India	Narendra Modi	2024-08-23	First visit by any Indian Prime Minister since Ukrainian Independence	
Indonesia	Joko Widodo	2022-06-29	Jokowi was the first Asian leader to visit Ukraine during the invasion. On June 30, he met with Vladimir Putin in Moscow.	
(Republic of Ireland) Ireland	Micheál Martin	2022-07-06		
(Republic of Ireland) Ireland	Micheál Martin	2026-07-23		
(Republic of Ireland) Ireland	Leo Varadkar	2023-07-19		
(Republic of Ireland) Ireland	Simon Harris	2024-09-04		
Italy	Mario Draghi	2022-06-16		
Italy	Giorgia Meloni	2023-02-21		
Italy	Giorgia Meloni	2024-02-24		
Japan	Fumio Kishida	2023-03-21		
Latvia	Egils Levits	2022-04-13		
Latvia	Egils Levits	2022-09-09		
Latvia	Egils Levits	2023-03-03		
Latvia	Krišjānis Kariņš	2023-03-16		
Latvia	Edgars Rinkēvičs	2023-11-24		
Latvia	Edgars Rinkēvičs	2025-02-24		
Latvia	Evika Siliņa	2024-09-11		
Latvia	Evika Siliņa	2025-07-15		
Latvia	Evika Siliņa	2026-02-24	Visited on the 4-year anniversary of Russia's full-scale invasion	
Latvia	Andris Kulbergs	2026-08-23-2026-08-24	Visited for Ukraine's national flag day and independence day.	
Lithuania	Gitanas Nausėda	2022-04-13		
Lithuania	Gitanas Nausėda	2022-07-28		
Lithuania	Gitanas Nausėda	2023-01-11		
Lithuania	Gitanas Nausėda	2023-06-28		
Lithuania	Gitanas Nausėda	2023-08-23–2023-08-24		
Lithuania	Gitanas Nausėda	2024-09-11		
Lithuania	Gitanas Nausėda	2025-02-24		
Lithuania	Gitanas Nausėda	2026-08-23-2026-08-24	Visited for Ukraine's national flag day and independence day.	
Lithuania	Ingrida Šimonytė	2022-04-11		
Lithuania	Ingrida Šimonytė	2022-11-26		
Lithuania	Ingrida Šimonytė	2023-11-24		
Lithuania	Ingrida Šimonytė	2024-08-24		
Lithuania	Gintautas Paluckas	2024-12-20		
Lithuania	Inga Ruginienė	2025-10-06		
Luxembourg	Xavier Bettel	2022-06-21		
Luxembourg	Luc Frieden	2026-08-24	Visited for Ukrainian independence day.	
Moldova	Maia Sandu	2022-06-27		
Moldova	Maia Sandu	2023-03-31		
Moldova	Maia Sandu	2025-01-25		
Moldova	Maia Sandu	2025-06-11		
Moldova	Maia Sandu	2026-04-26	40-year anniversary of International Chernobyl Disaster Remembrance Day	
Moldova	Maia Sandu	2026-07-15	The 5th Ukraine-Southeast Europe Summit	
Moldova	Maia Sandu	2026-08-24	Visited for Ukrainian independence day.	
Moldova	Natalia Gavrilița	2022-12-06		
Moldova	Alexandru Munteanu	2026-02-10		
Moldova	Vasile Tofan	2026-10-26-2026-10-27		
Montenegro	Dritan Abazović	2022-06-15		
Montenegro	Jakov Milatović	2025-06-11		
Netherlands	Mark Rutte	2022-07-11		
Netherlands	Mark Rutte	2023-02-17		
Netherlands	Mark Rutte	2023-10-13		
Netherlands	Mark Rutte	2024-03-01		
Netherlands	Dick Schoof	2024-09-02		
Netherlands	Dick Schoof	2025-02-15		
Netherlands	Dick Schoof	2025-10-06		
Netherlands	Rob Jetten	2026-03-08		
Norway	Jonas Gahr Støre	2022-07-01		
Norway	Jonas Gahr Støre	2023-08-24		
Norway	Jonas Gahr Støre	2025-02-24		
Norway	Jonas Gahr Støre	2025-08-25		
Norway	Jonas Gahr Støre	2026-02-24–2026-02-25	Visited on the 4-year anniversary of Russia's full-scale invasion	
Norway	Jonas Gahr Støre	2026-08-23	Visited for Ukraine's national flag day.	
Poland	Mateusz Morawiecki	2022-03-15		
Poland	Mateusz Morawiecki	2022-06-01		
Poland	Mateusz Morawiecki	2022-09-09		
Poland	Mateusz Morawiecki	2022-11-26		
Poland	Mateusz Morawiecki	2023-02-24		
Poland	Mateusz Morawiecki	2023-07-07		
Poland	Andrzej Duda	2022-04-13		
Poland	Andrzej Duda	2022-05-22		
Poland	Andrzej Duda	2022-08-23		
Poland	Andrzej Duda	2023-01-11		
Poland	Andrzej Duda	2023-06-28		
Poland	Andrzej Duda	2024-08-24		
Poland	Andrzej Duda	2025-06-28		
Poland	Donald Tusk	2024-01-22		
Poland	Donald Tusk	2024-12-17		
Poland	Donald Tusk	2025-05-10		
Poland	Donald Tusk	2026-02-05		
Poland	Donald Tusk	2026-09-18	Attended the Carpathian 8 summit	
Portugal	António Costa	2022-05-21		
Portugal	Marcelo Rebelo de Sousa	2023-08-23		
Portugal	Luís Montenegro	2025-12-20		
Qatar	Mohammed bin Abdulrahman bin Jassim Al Thani	2023-07-28		
Romania	Nicolae Ciucă	2022-04-26		
Romania	Klaus Iohannis	2022-06-16		
Romania	Nicușor Dan	2025-06-11		
Romania	Nicușor Dan	2026-07-15	The 5th Ukraine-Southeast Europe Summit	
Romania	Nicușor Dan	2026-09-18	Attended the Carpathian 8 summit	
Senegal	Macky Sall	2023-06-16		
Serbia	Aleksandar Vučić	2025-06-11		
Serbia	Aleksandar Vučić	2026-07-15		
Serbia	Aleksandar Vučić	2026-09-18	Attended the Carpathian 8 summit	
Slovakia	Eduard Heger	2022-04-08		
Slovakia	Eduard Heger	2023-03-31		
Slovakia	Zuzana Čaputová	2022-05-31		
Slovakia	Zuzana Čaputová	2023-04-28		
Slovakia	Zuzana Čaputová	2024-05-10		
Slovakia	Robert Fico	2024-01-24		
Slovakia	Robert Fico	2025-09-05		
Slovakia	Robert Fico	2026-11-05		
Slovenia	Janez Janša	2022-03-15		
Slovenia	Janez Janša	2026-07-15	The 5th Ukraine-Southeast Europe Summit	
Slovenia	Robert Golob	2023-03-31		
Slovenia	Nataša Pirc Musar	2024-06-28		
South Africa	Cyril Ramaphosa	2023-06-16		
South Korea	Yoon Suk Yeol	2023-07-15		
Spain	Pedro Sánchez	2022-04-21		
Spain	Pedro Sánchez	2023-02-23		
Spain	Pedro Sánchez	2023-07-01		
Spain	Pedro Sánchez	2025-02-24		
Sweden	Magdalena Andersson	2022-07-04		
Sweden	Ulf Kristersson	2023-02-15		
Sweden	Ulf Kristersson	2025-02-24		
Sweden	Ulf Kristersson	2026-02-24		
Sweden	Carl XVI Gustaf	2026-04-17	First monarch to visit Ukraine during the invasion.	
Switzerland	Ignazio Cassis	2022-10-20		
Switzerland	Alain Berset	2023-11-25		
Turkey	Recep Tayyip Erdoğan	2022-08-18		
United Kingdom	Boris Johnson	2022-04-09		
United Kingdom	Boris Johnson	2022-06-17		
United Kingdom	Boris Johnson	2022-08-24		
United Kingdom	Rishi Sunak	2022-11-19		
United Kingdom	Rishi Sunak	2024-01-12		
United Kingdom	Keir Starmer	2025-01-16		
United Kingdom	Keir Starmer	2025-05-10		
United Kingdom	Keir Starmer	2026-07-16		
United Kingdom	Andy Burnham	2026-08-24	Visited for Ukrainian independence day.	
United States	Joe Biden	2023-02-20		
Zambia	Hakainde Hichilema	2023-06-16		

== Gallery ==
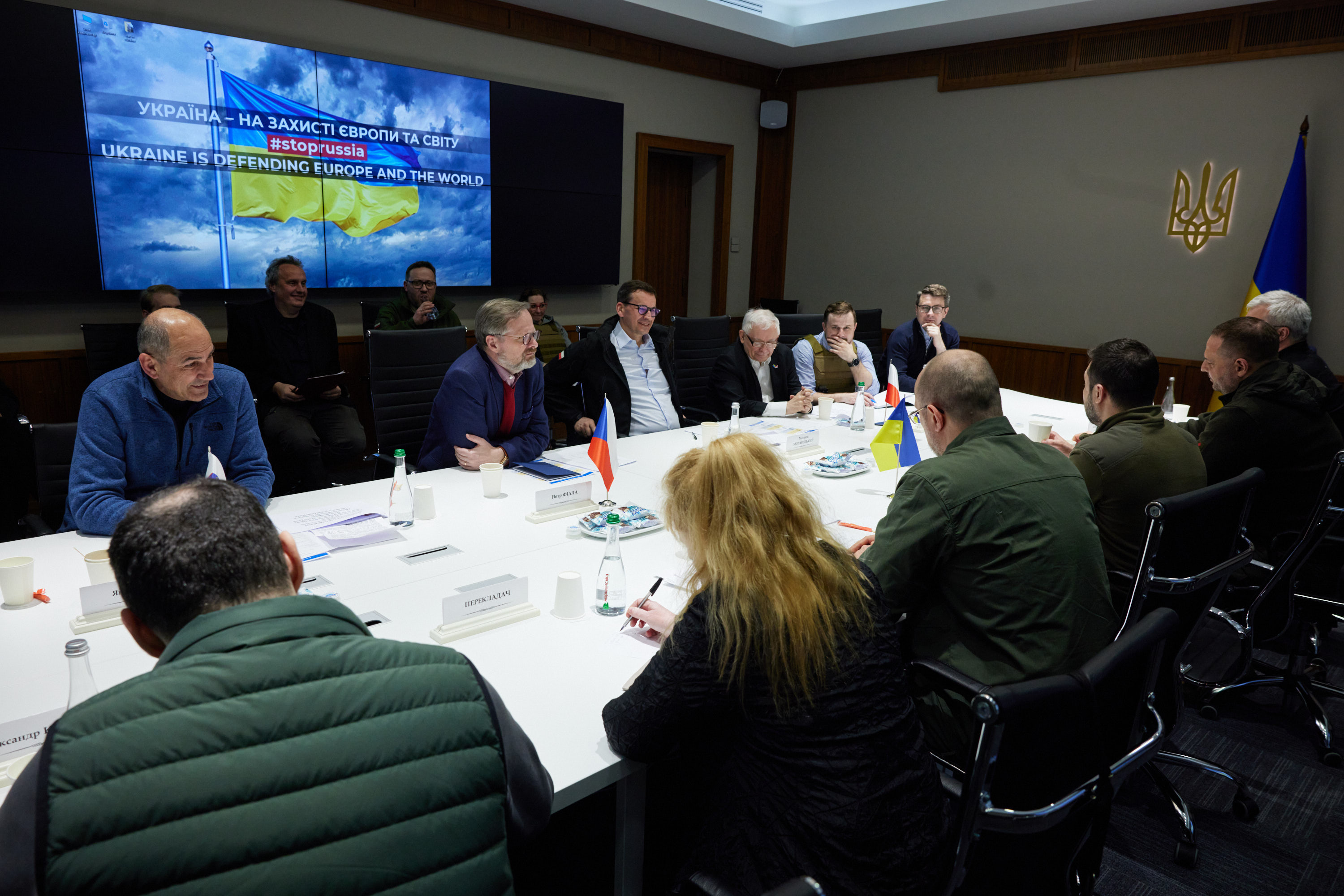
Volodymyr Zelenskyy meeting with Prime Minister of Poland Mateusz Morawiecki, Deputy Prime Minister of Poland Jarosław Kaczyński, Prime Minister of the Czech Republic Petr Fiala and Prime Minister of Slovenia Janez Janša on March 15, 2022

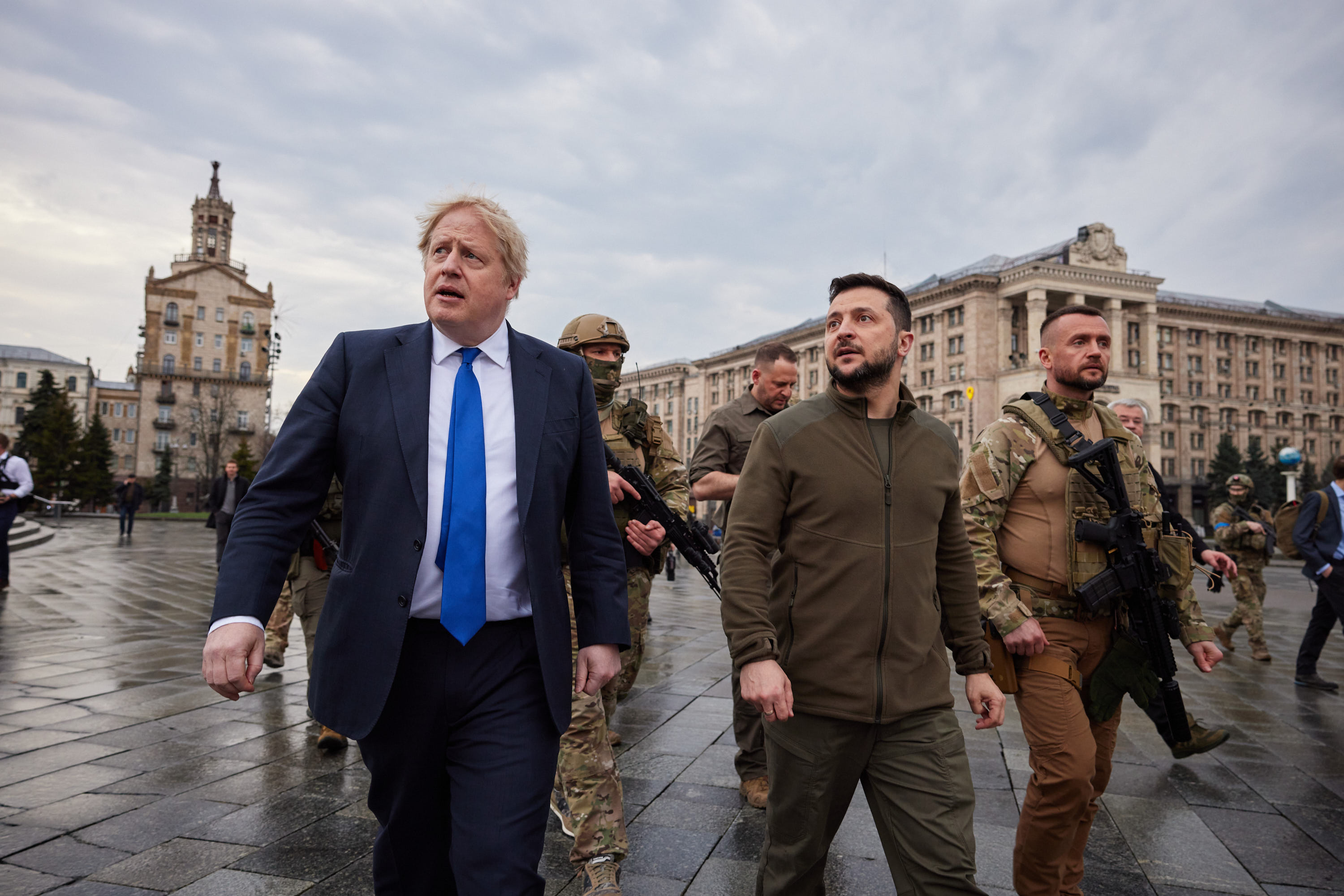
British Prime Minister Boris Johnson walks on a street of war-hit Kyiv alongside Zelenskyy on April 9, 2022

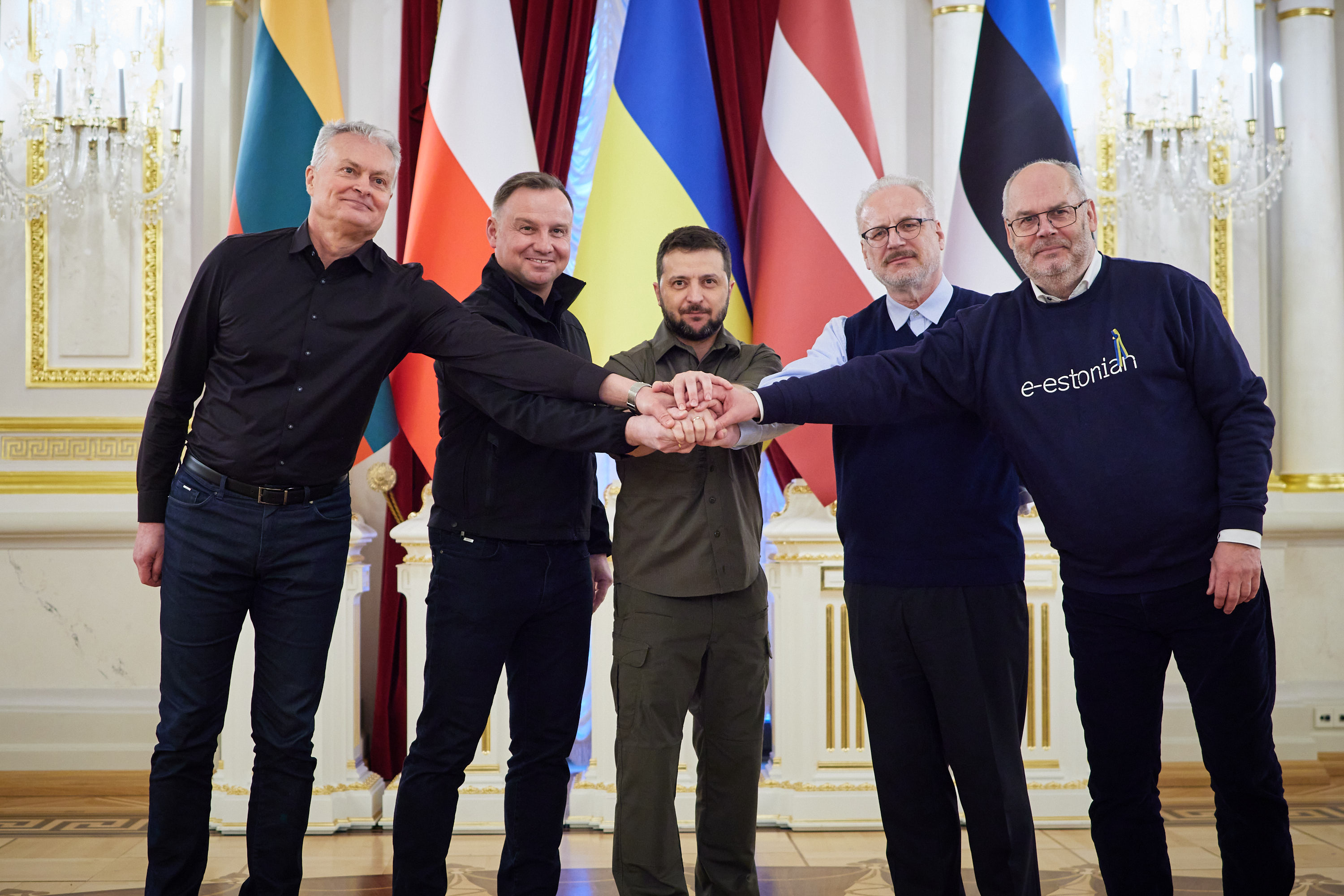
Lithuanian President Gitanas Nausėda, Polish President Andrzej Duda, Latvian President Egils Levits and Estonian President Alar Karis in Kyiv on April 13, 2022

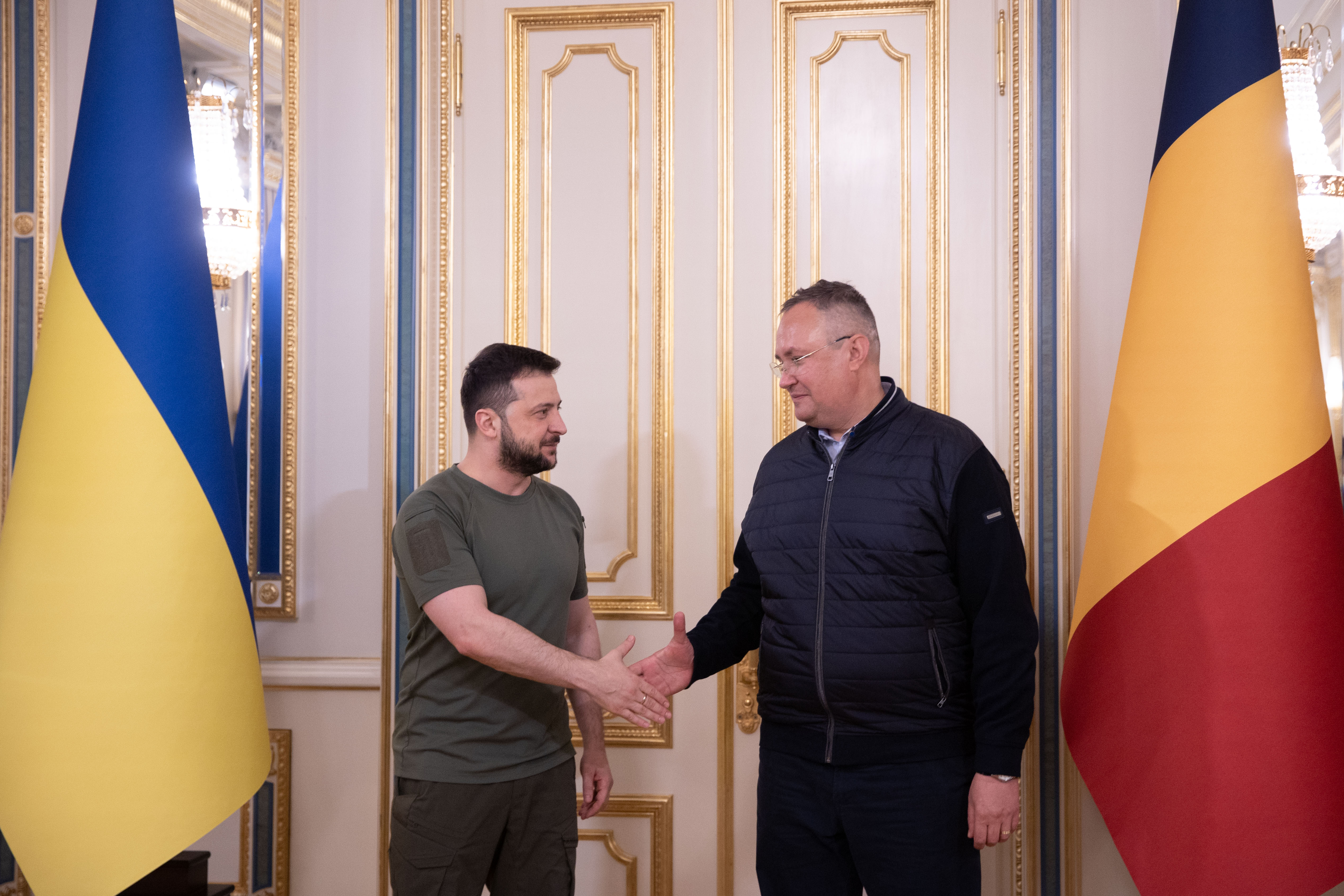
Romanian Prime Minister Nicolae Ciucă in Kyiv on April 26, 2022

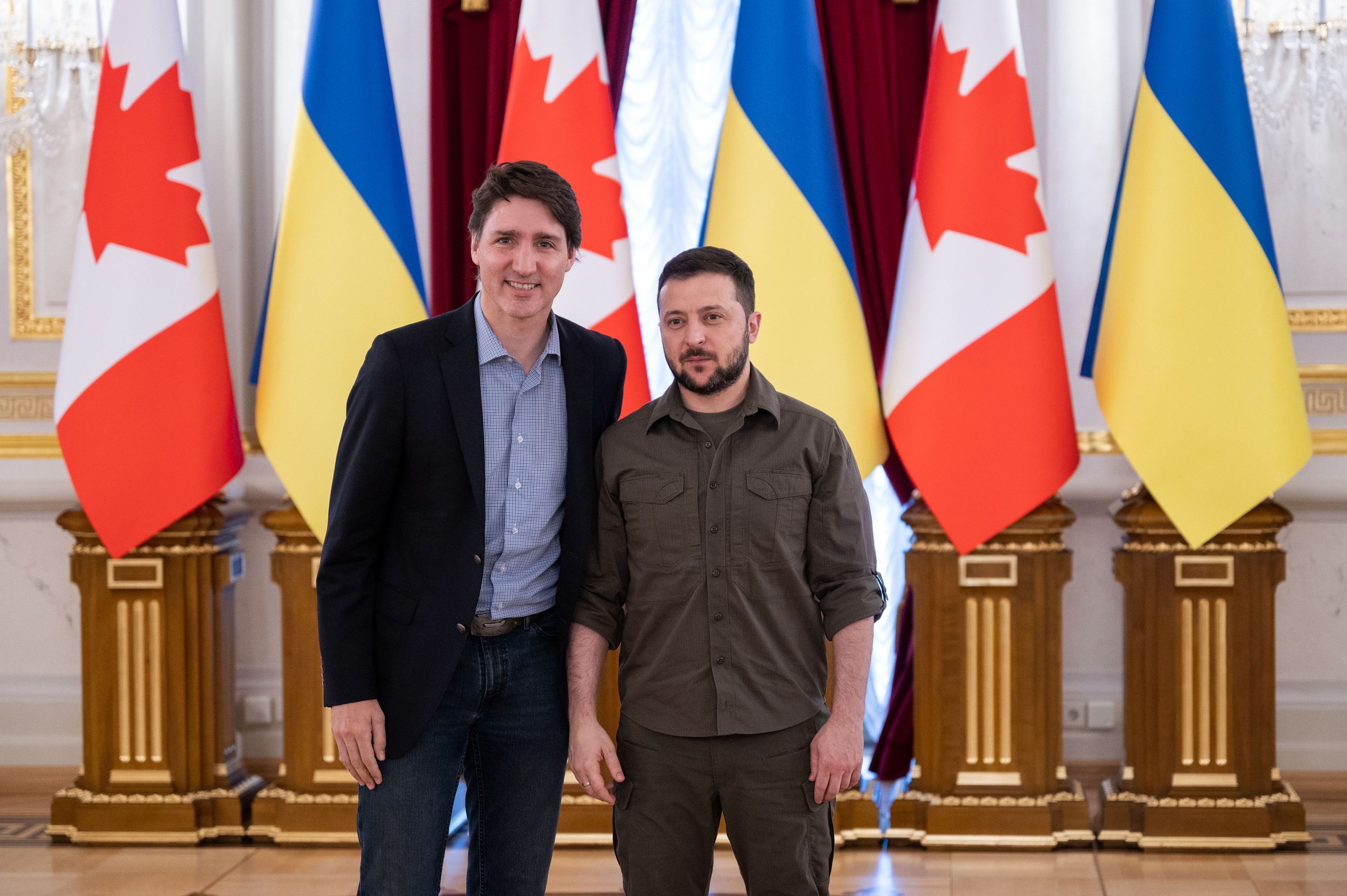
Canadian Prime Minister Justin Trudeau with Ukrainian President Volodymyr Zelenskyy in Kyiv on May 8, 2022

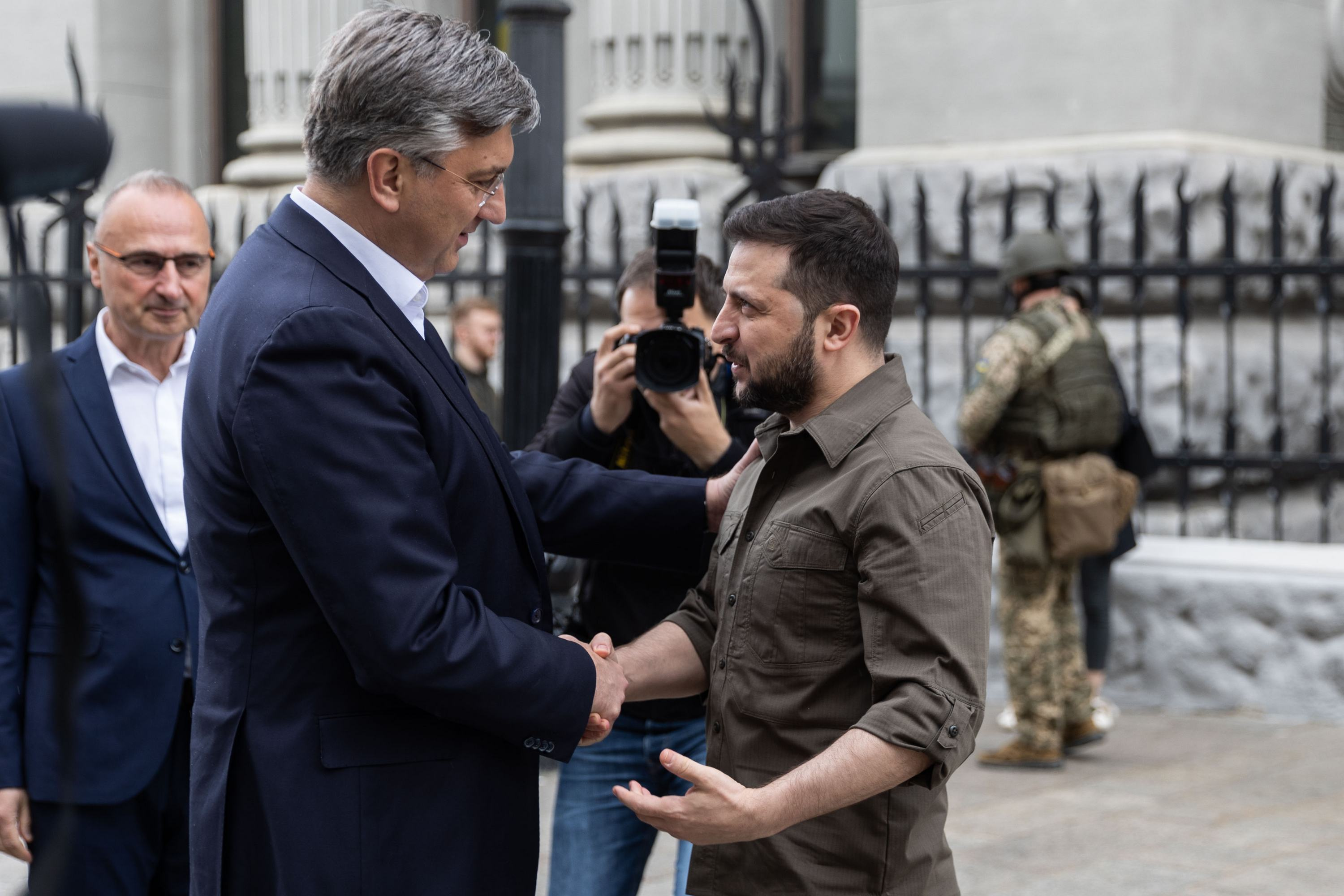
Croatian Prime Minister Andrej Plenković greeting Ukrainian president Volodymyr Zelenskyy in Kyiv on May 8, 2022

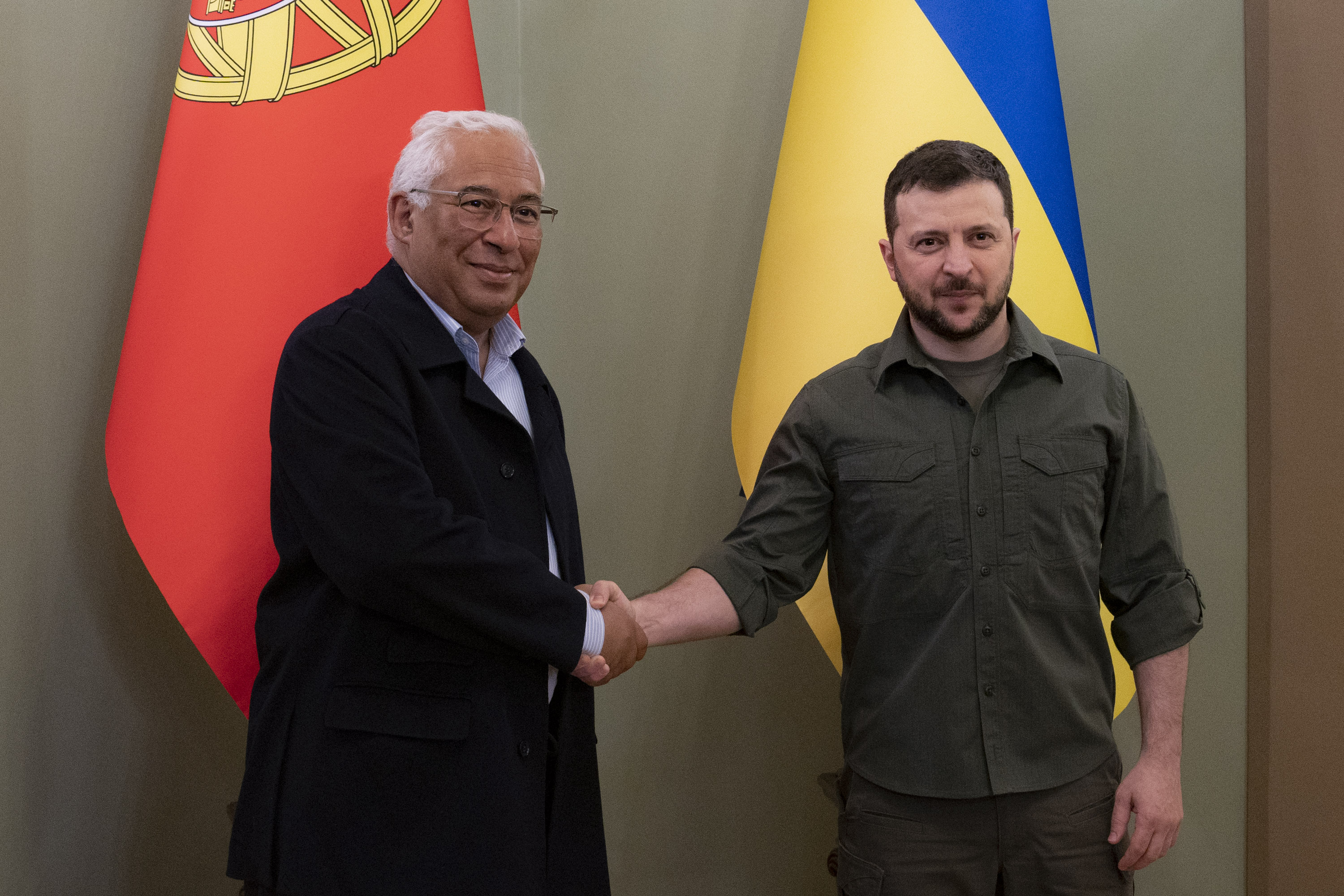
Portuguese Prime Minister António Costa met with Ukrainian President Zelenskyy in Kyiv on May 21, 2022.

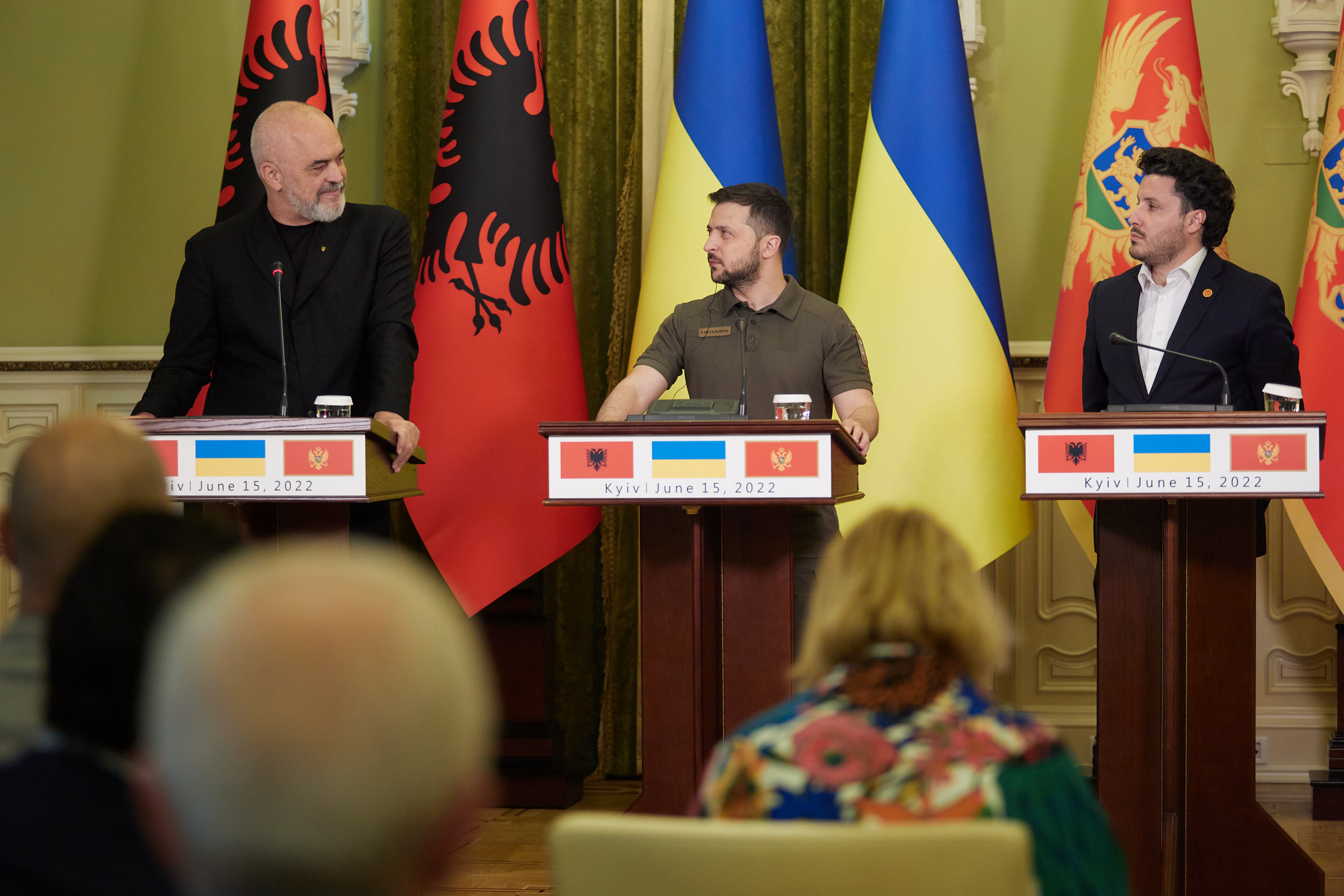
Albanian Prime Minister Edi Rama and Montenegrin Prime Minister Dritan Abazović in Kyiv on June 15, 2022

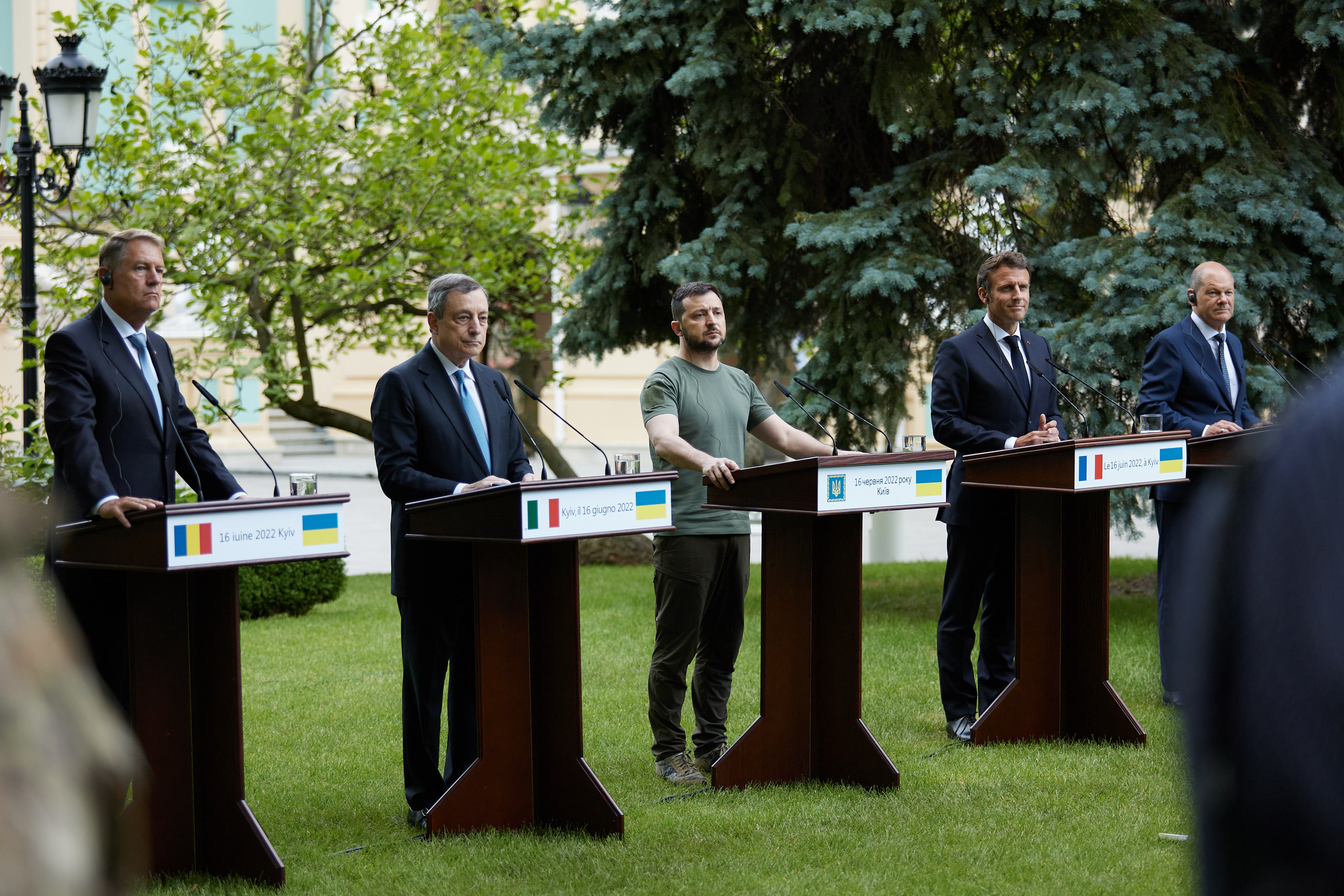
French President Emmanuel Macron, German Chancellor Olaf Scholz, Italian Prime Minister Mario Draghi and Romanian President Klaus Iohannis in Kyiv on June 16, 2022

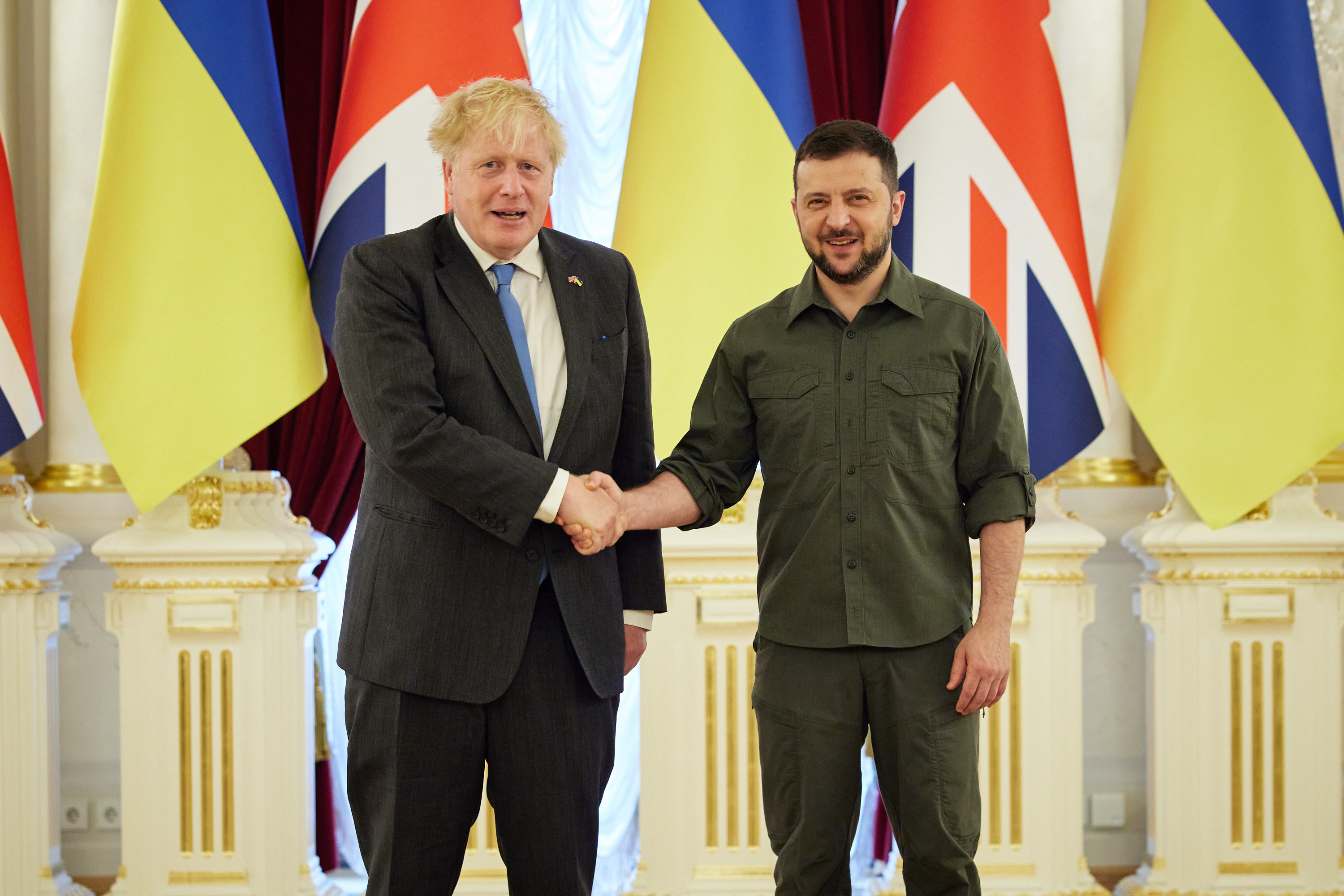
Volodymyr Zelenskyy meeting with British Prime Minister Boris Johnson in Kyiv on June 17, 2022

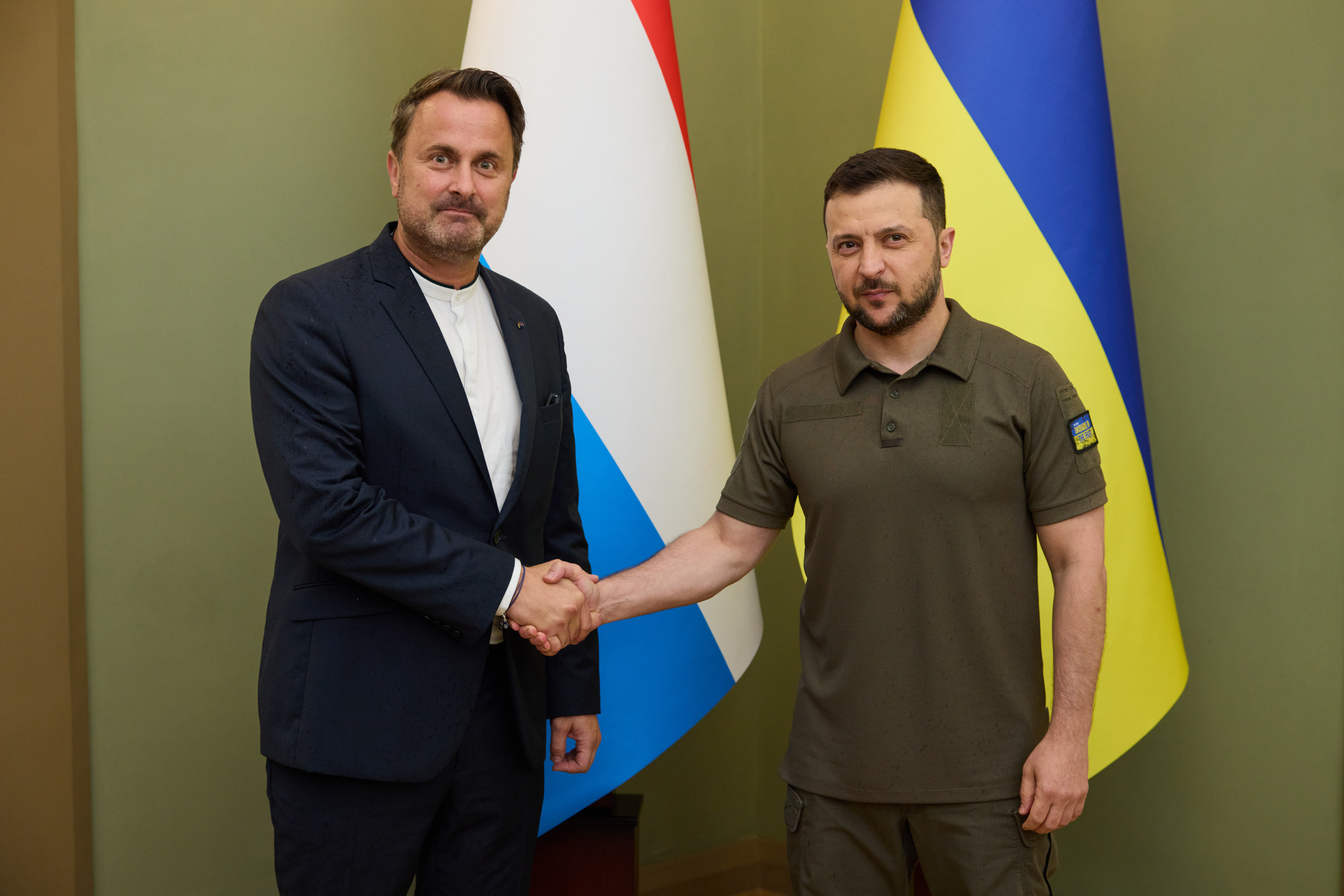
Luxembourgish Prime Minister Xavier Bettel in Kyiv on June 21, 2022

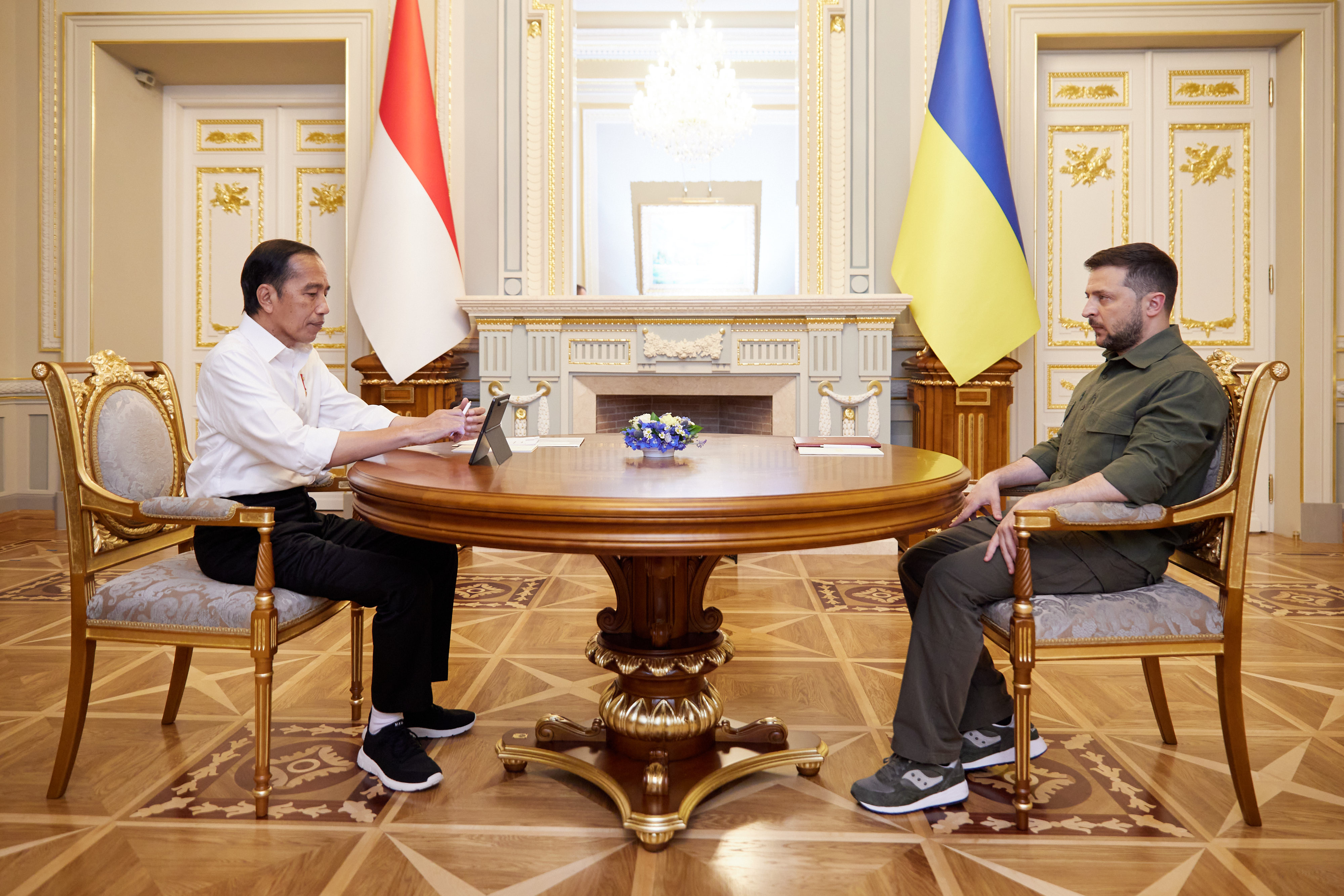
Indonesian President Joko Widodo in Kyiv on June 29, 2022

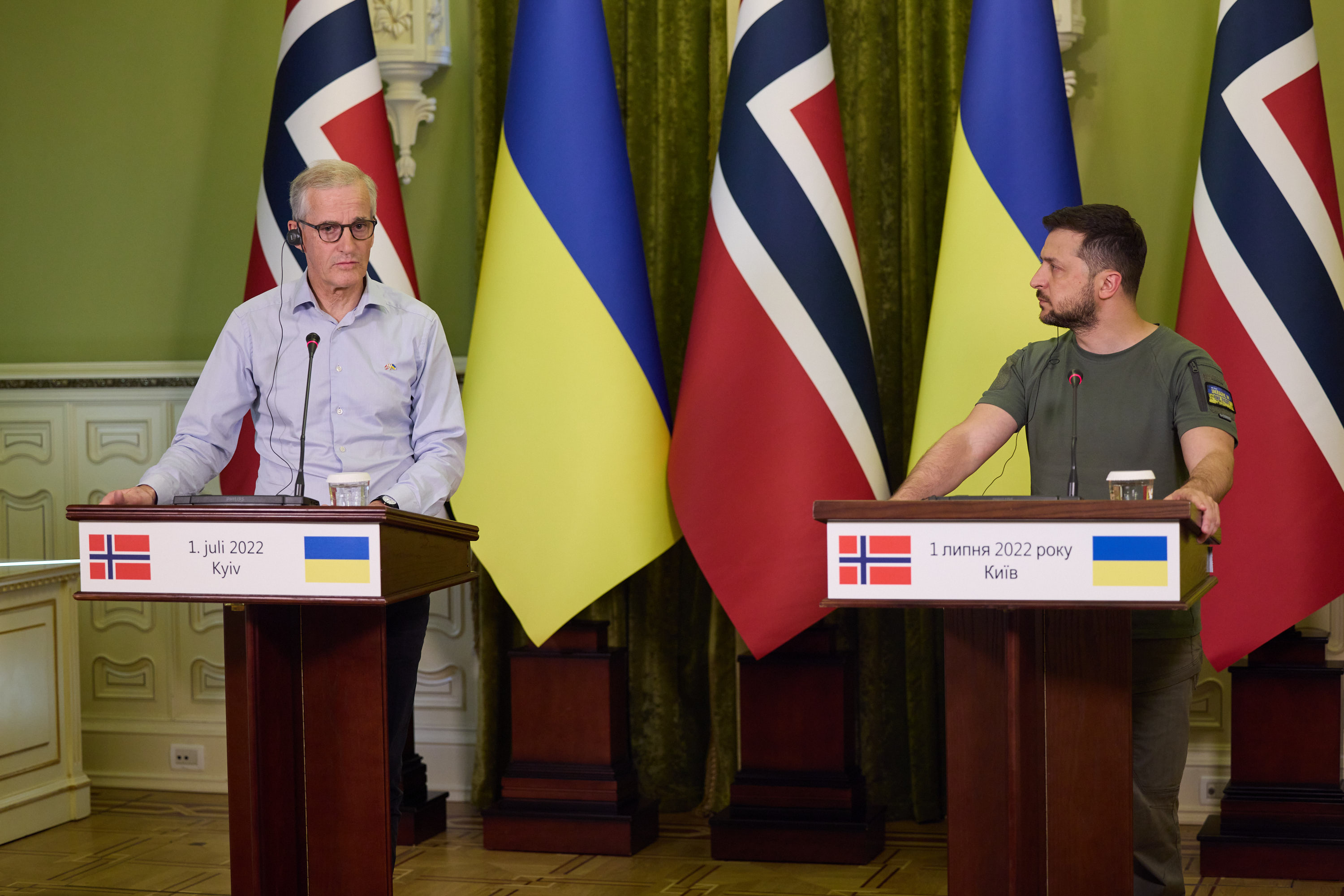
Jonas Gahr Støre with Ukrainian President Volodymyr Zelenskyy in Kyiv on July 1, 2022

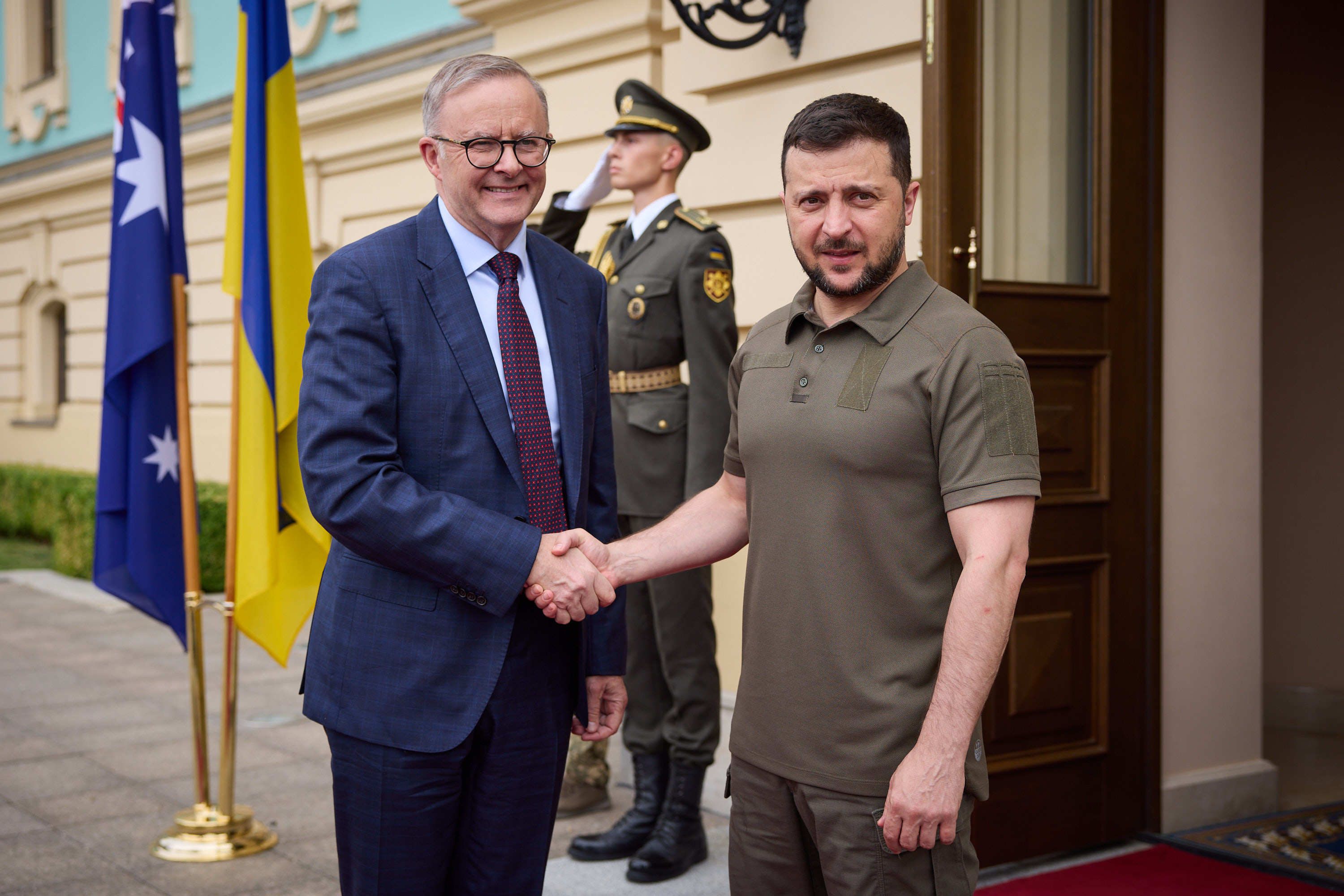
Anthony Albanese visiting Ukrainian president Volodymyr Zelenskyy in Kyiv, July 3, 2022

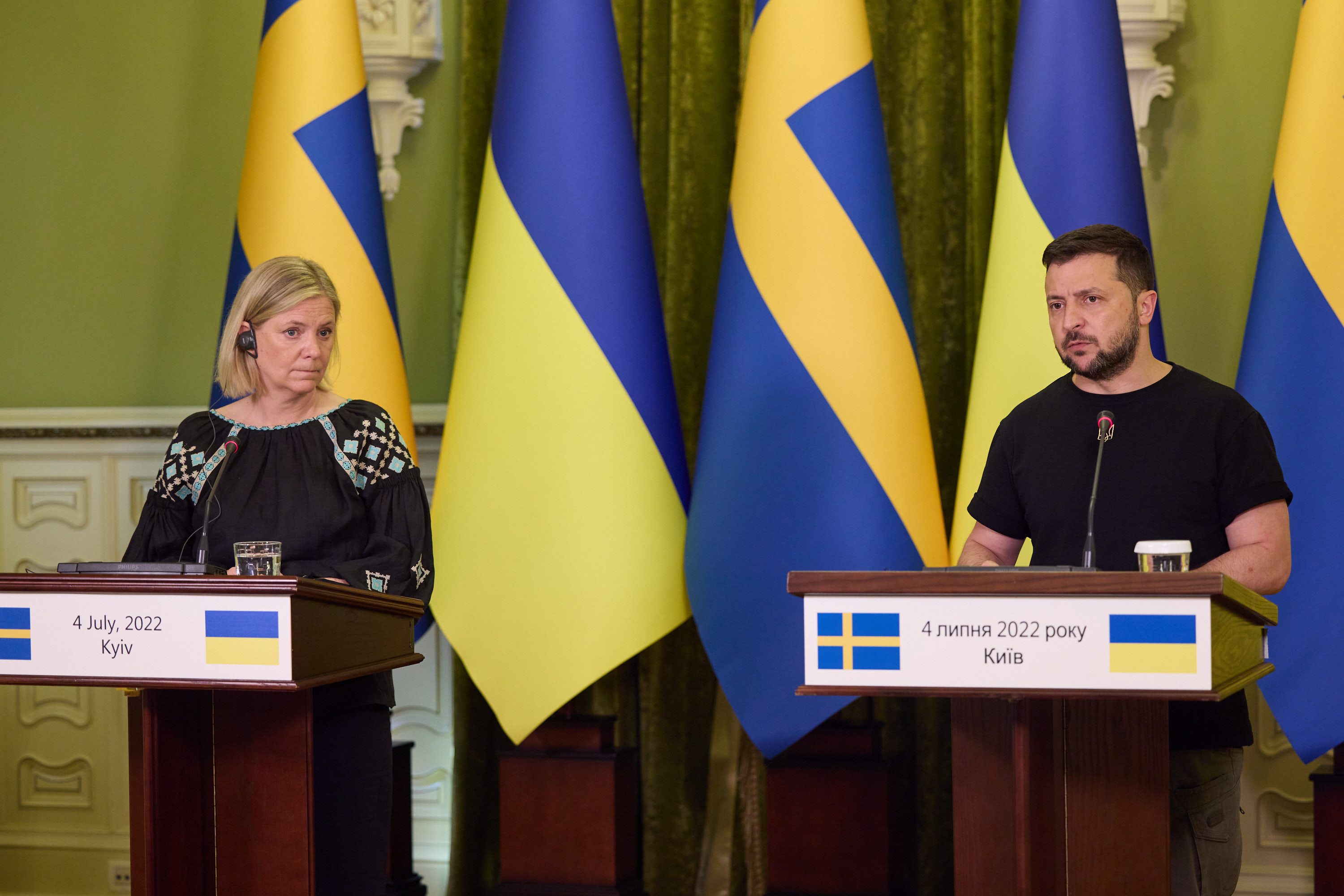
Swedish Prime Minister Magdalena Andersson met with the President of Ukraine Volodymyr Zelenskyy in Kyiv on July 4, 2022.

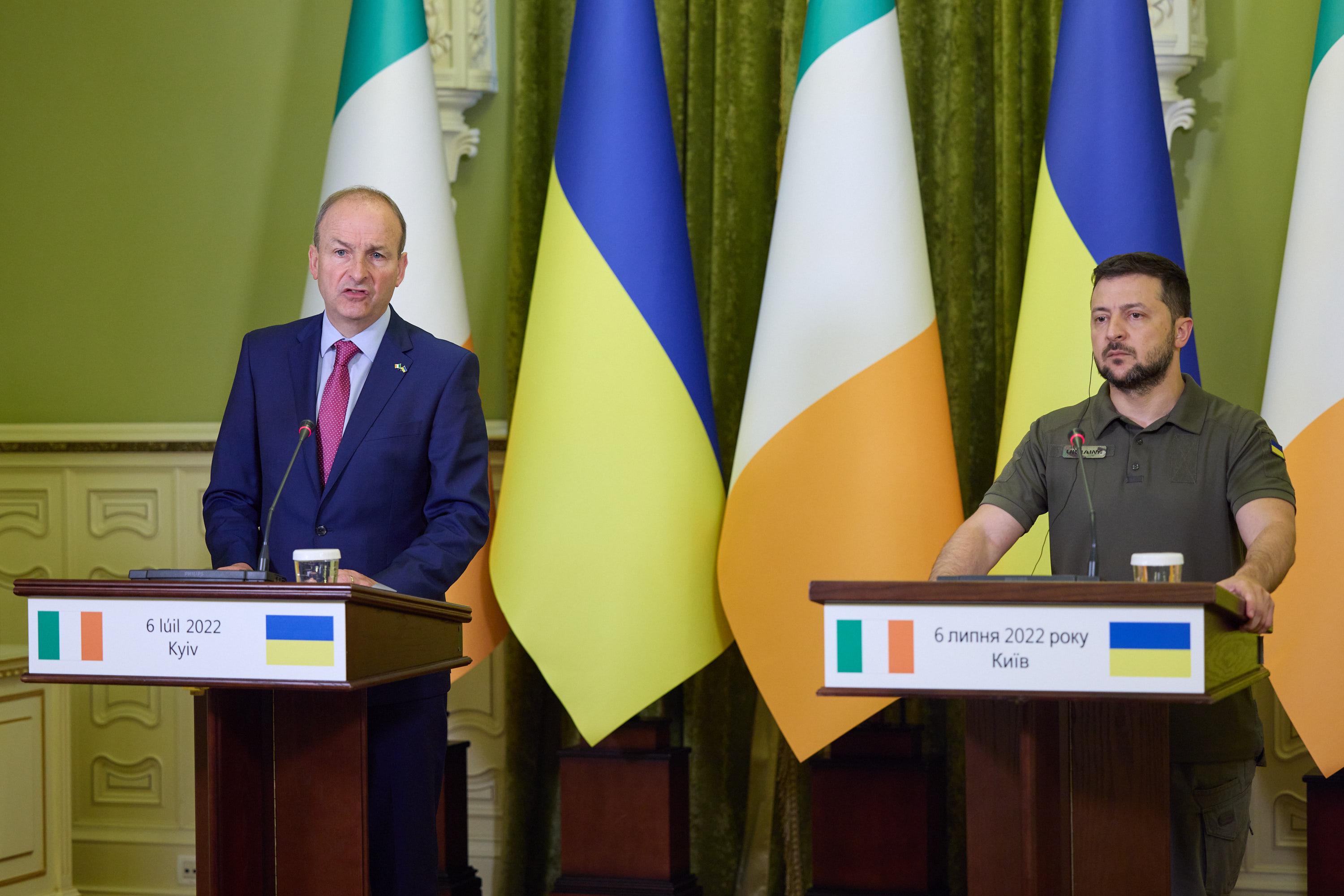
Prime Minister Micheál Martin in Kyiv, July 6, 2022

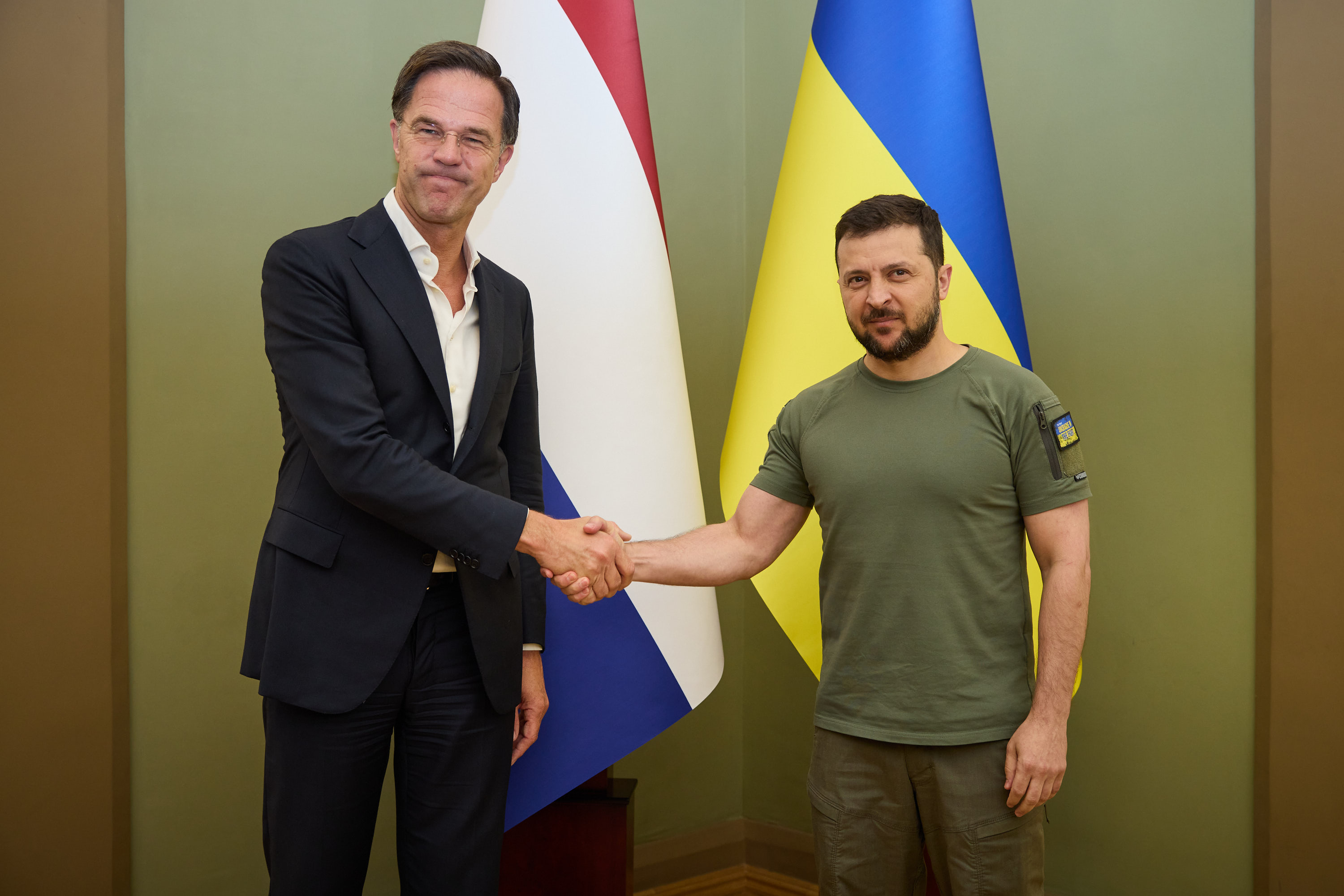
Volodymyr Zelenskyy meeting with Dutch Prime Minister Mark Rutte on July 11, 2022

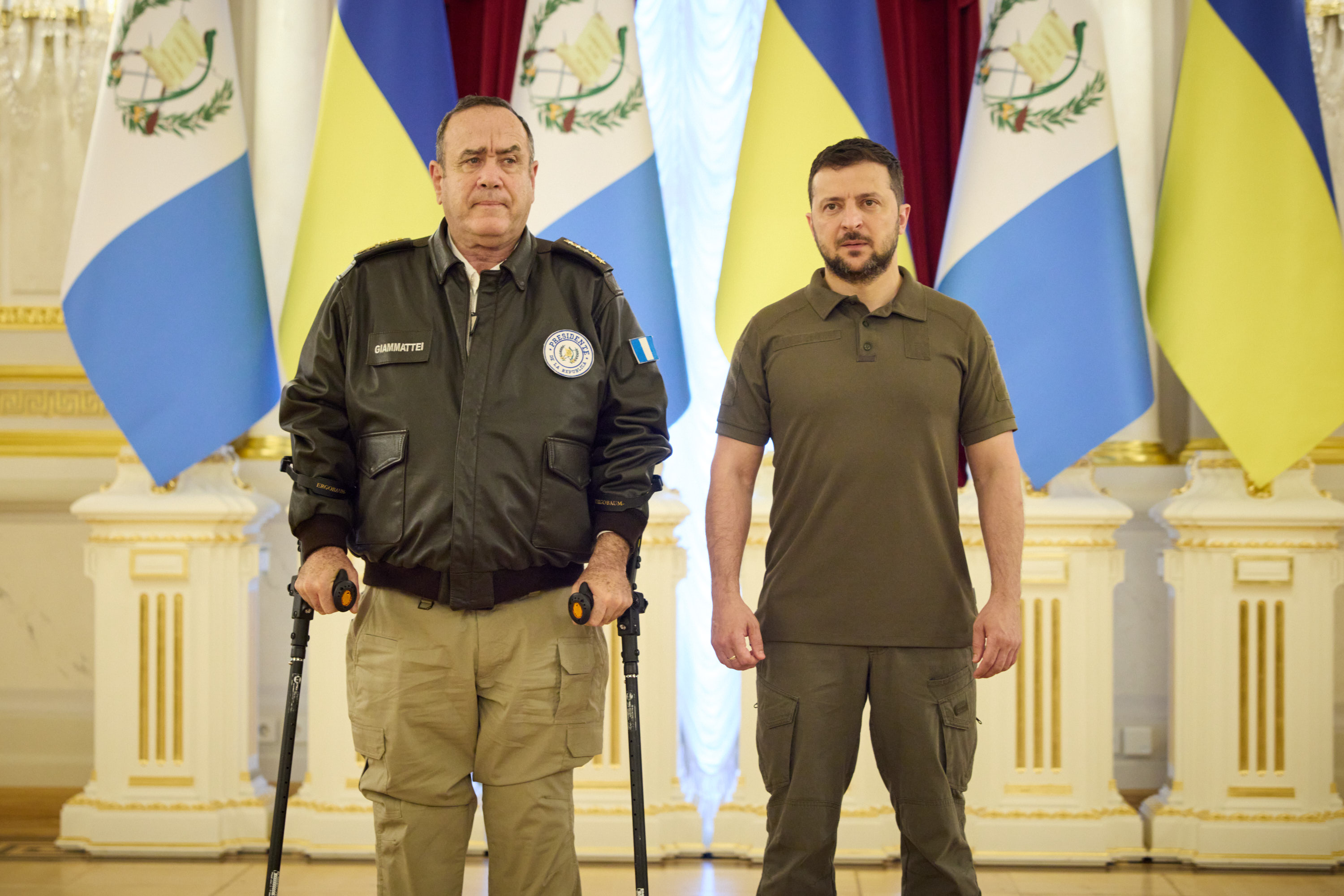
President of Guatemala Alejandro Giammattei in Kyiv on July 25, 2022

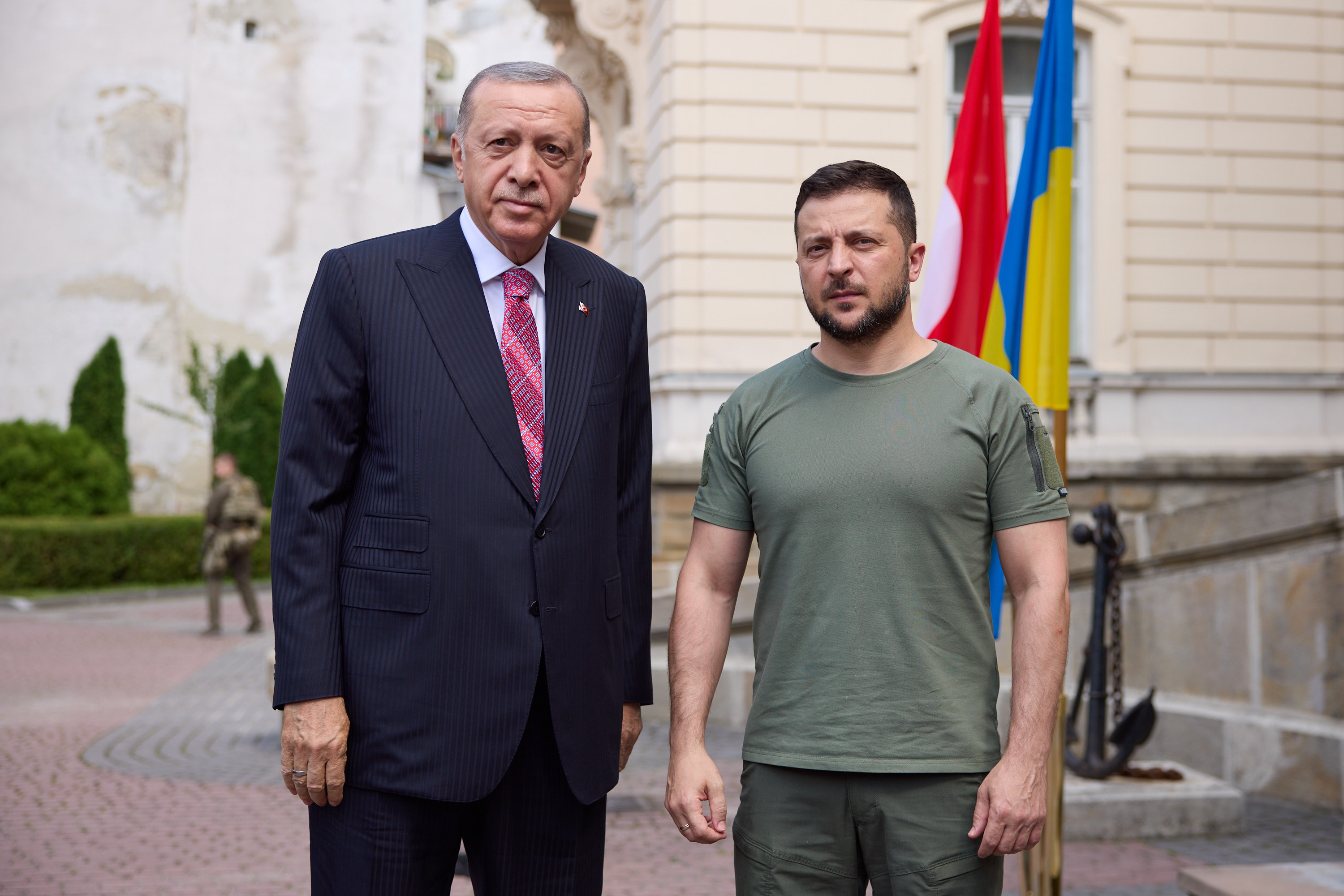
Volodymyr Zelenskyy meeting with Turkish President Recep Tayyip Erdoğan on August 18, 2022

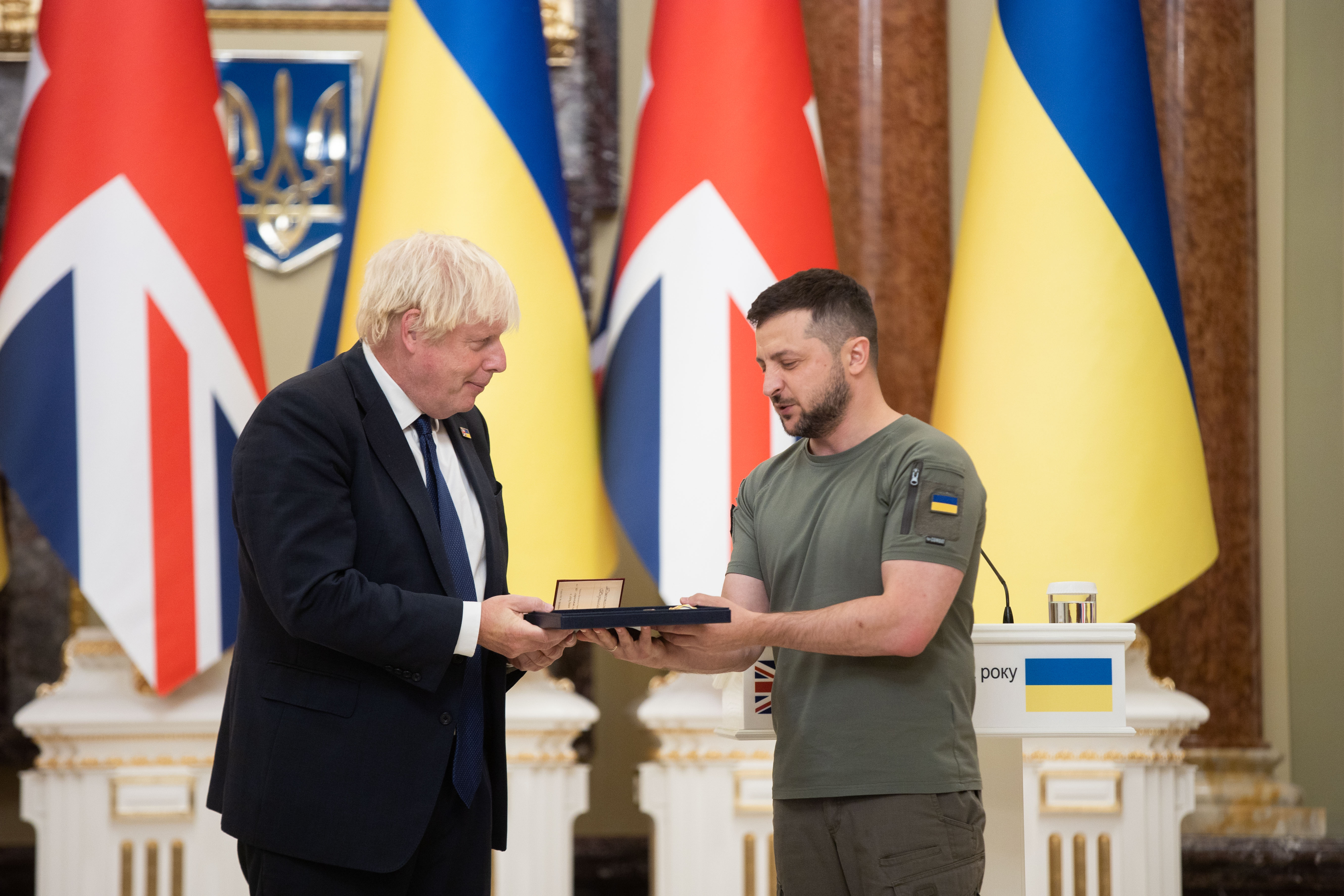
Volodymyr Zelenskyy meeting with British Prime Minister Boris Johnson in Kyiv on August 24, 2022

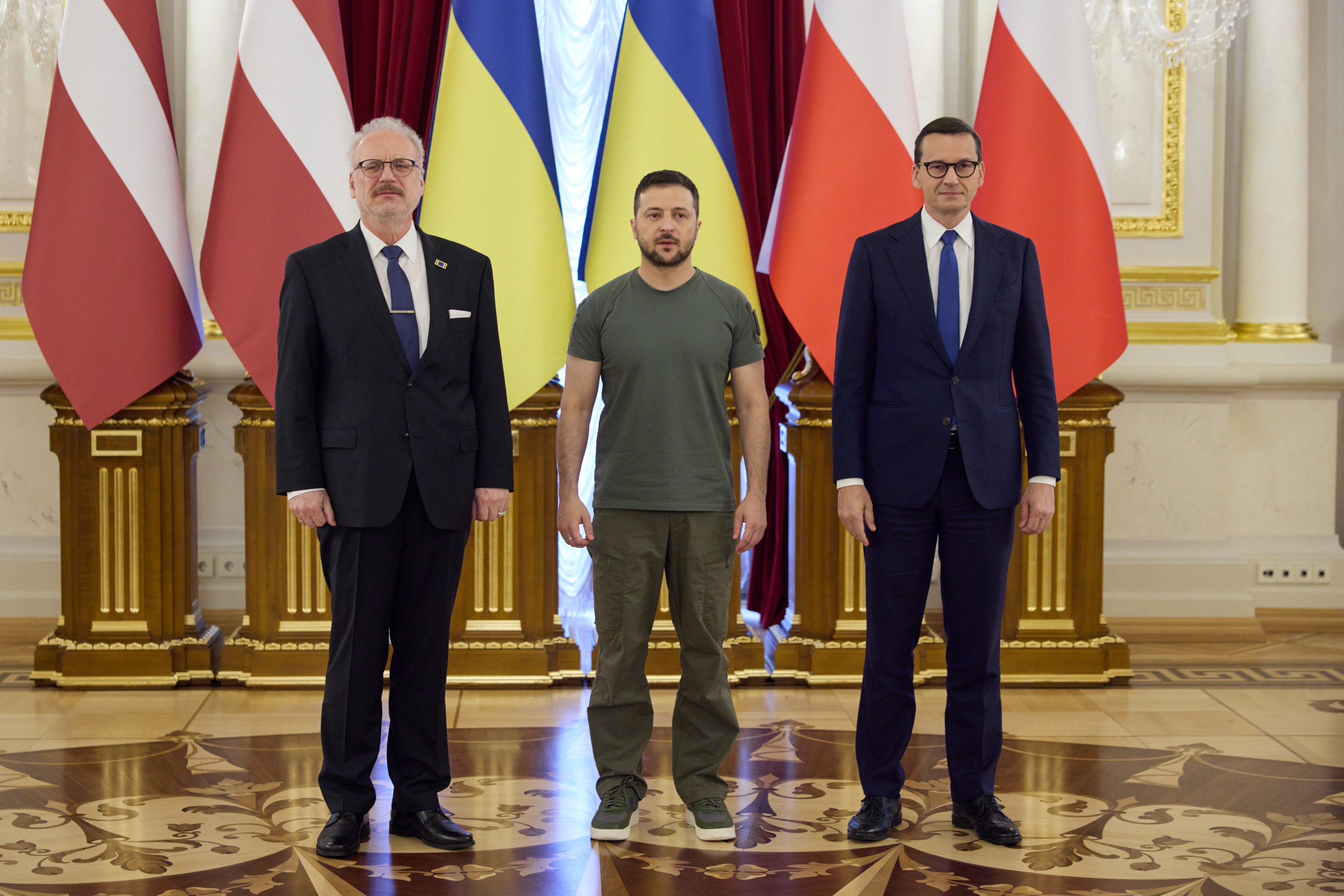
Latvian President Egils Levits and Polish Prime Minister Mateusz Morawiecki meets with the Ukrainian President Volodymyr Zelenskyy in Kyiv, September 9, 2022

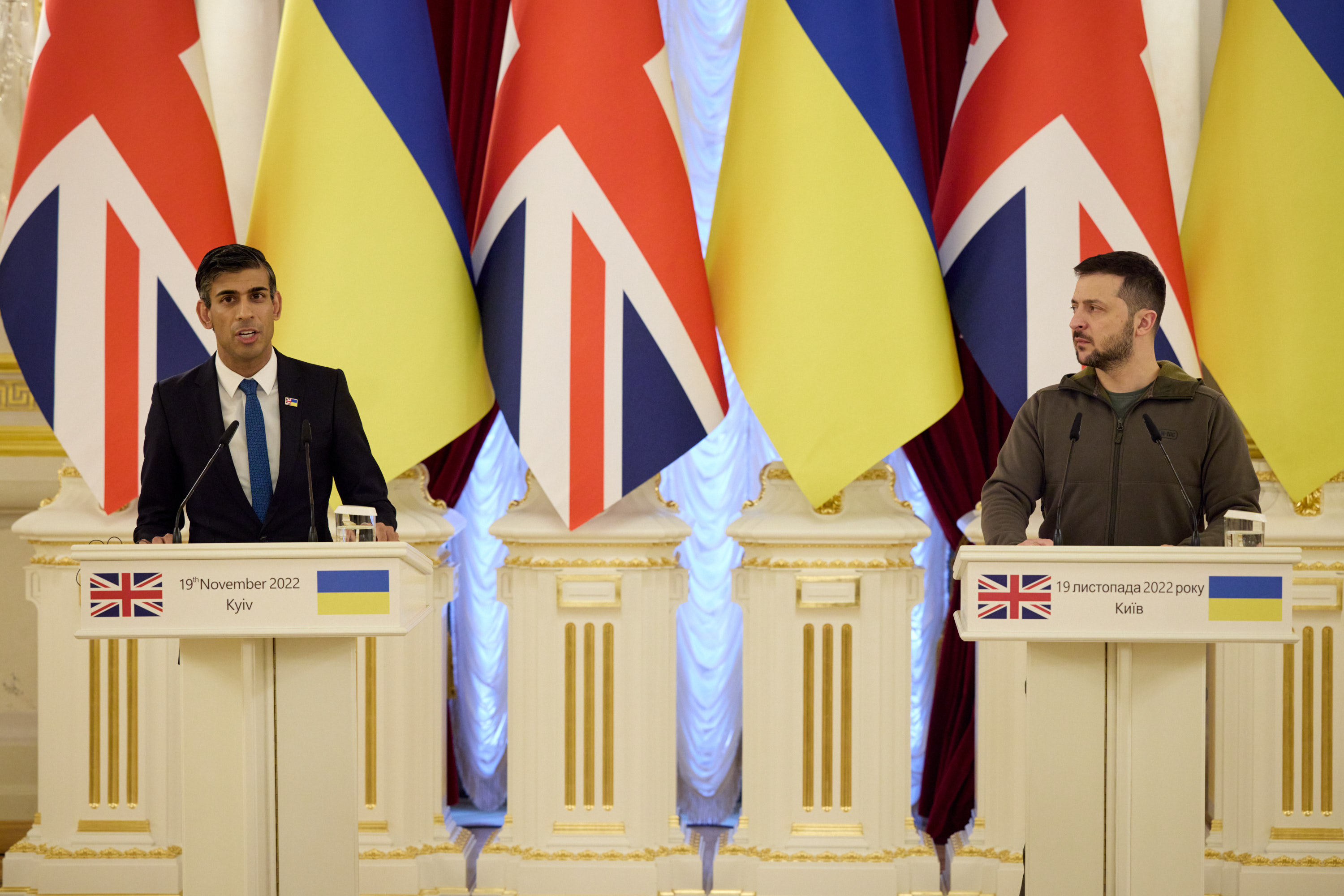
Volodymyr Zelenskyy meeting with British Prime Minister Rishi Sunak in Kyiv on November 19, 2022

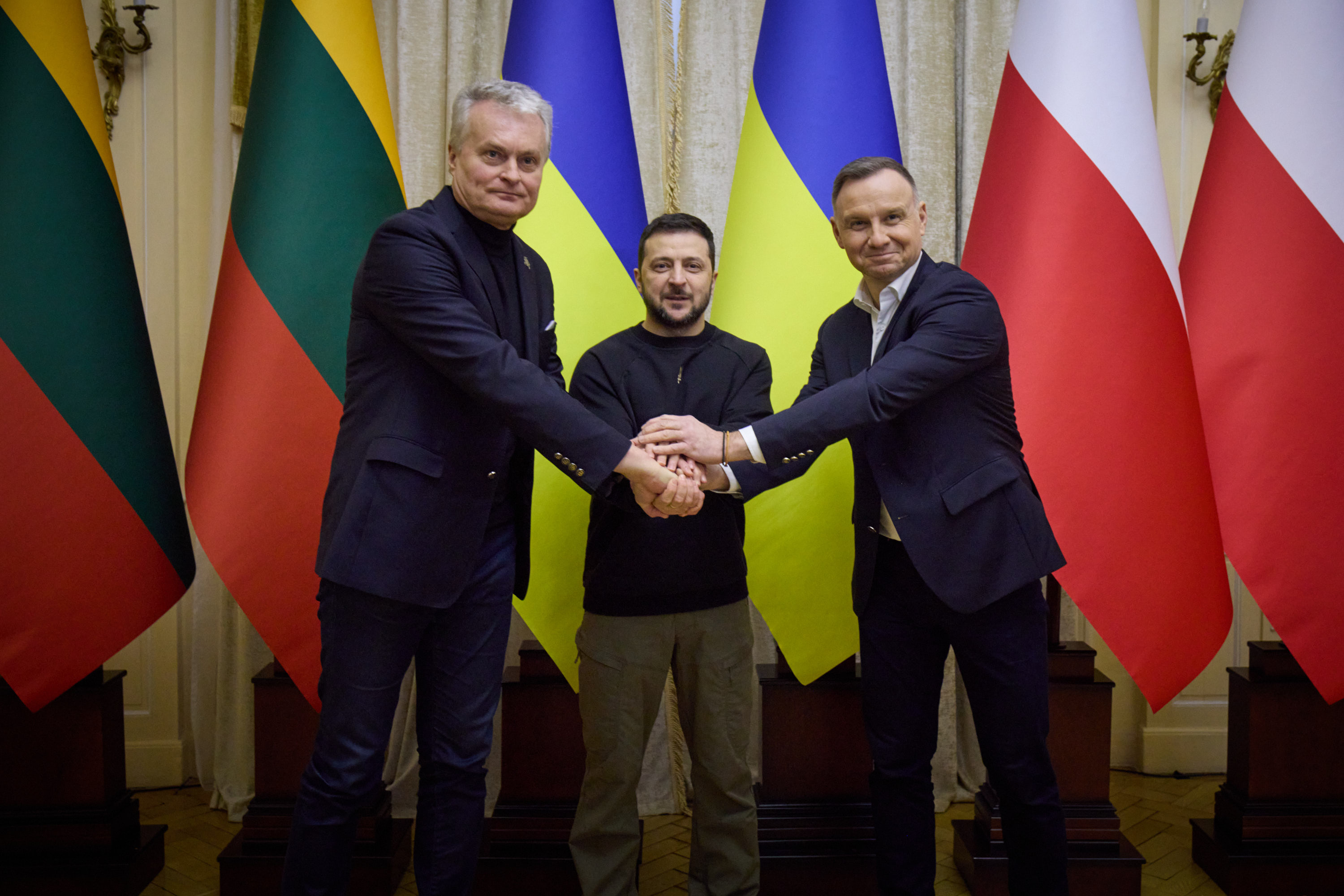
Andrzej Duda, Volodymyr Zelenskyy and Gitanas Nausėda held a meeting in the format of the Lublin Triangle in Lviv on January 11, 2023.

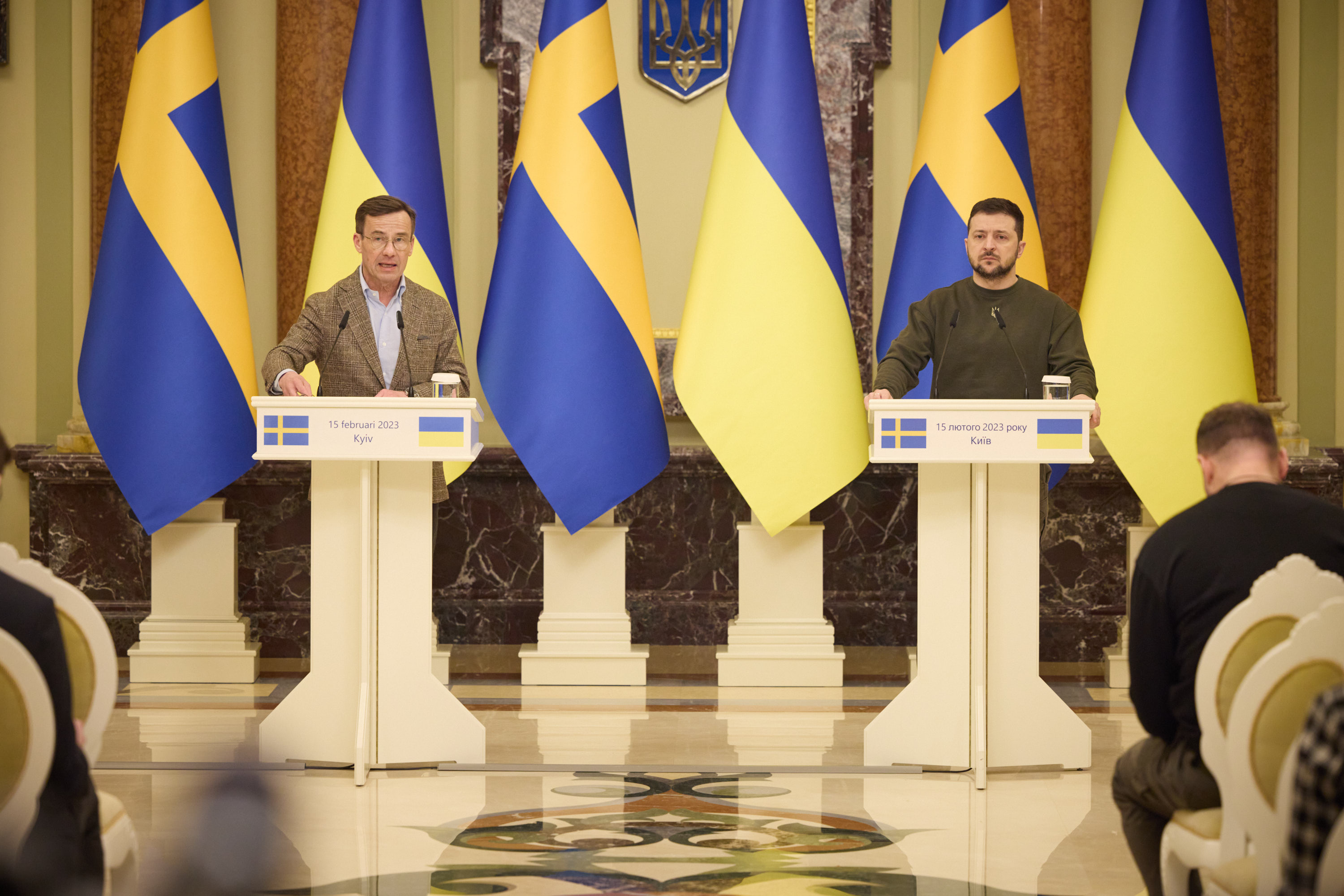
Volodymyr Zelenskyy and Prime Minister of Sweden Ulf Kristersson made speeches in Kyiv on February 15, 2023.

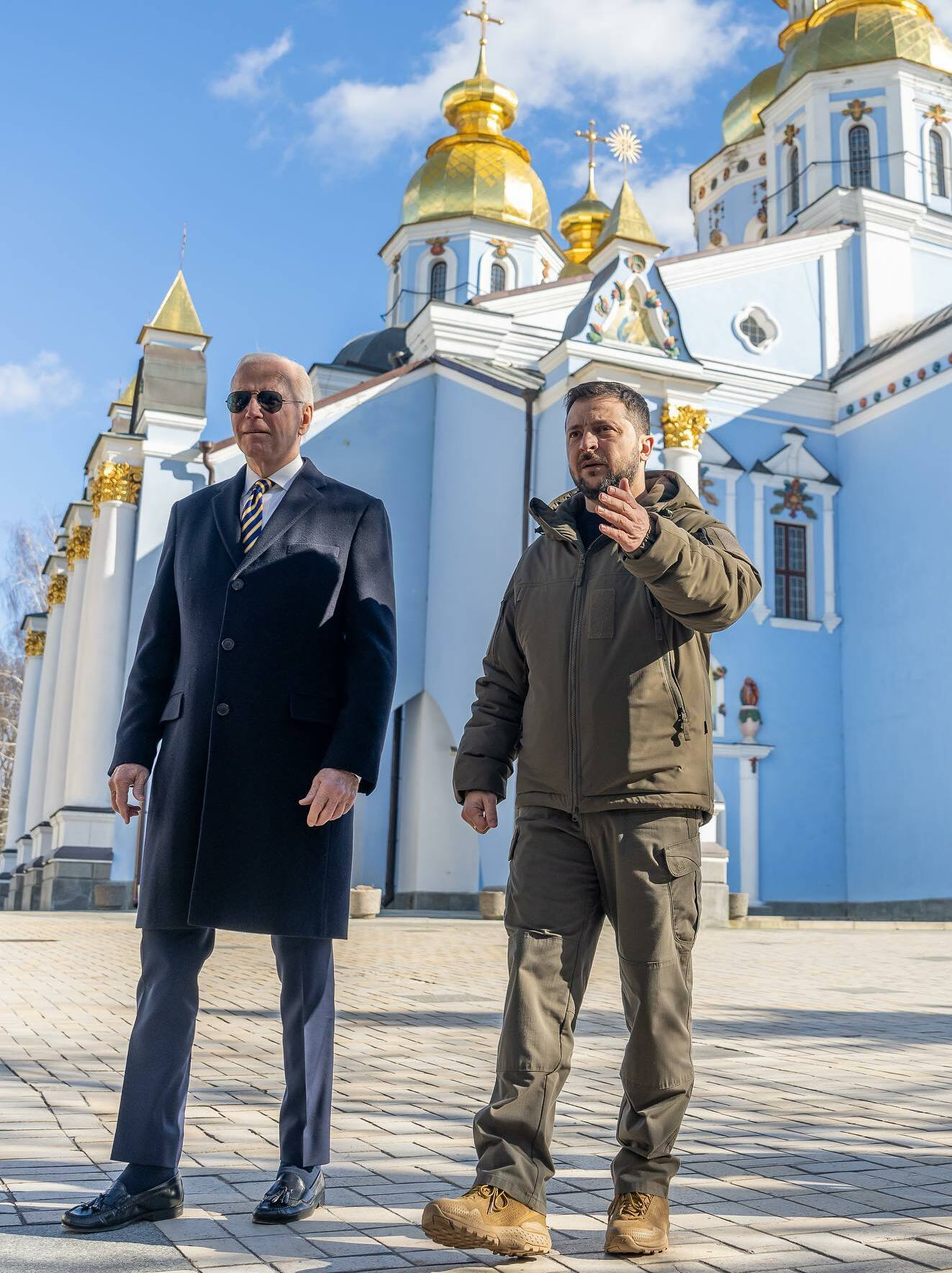
US President Joe Biden visited Kyiv on February 20, 2023.

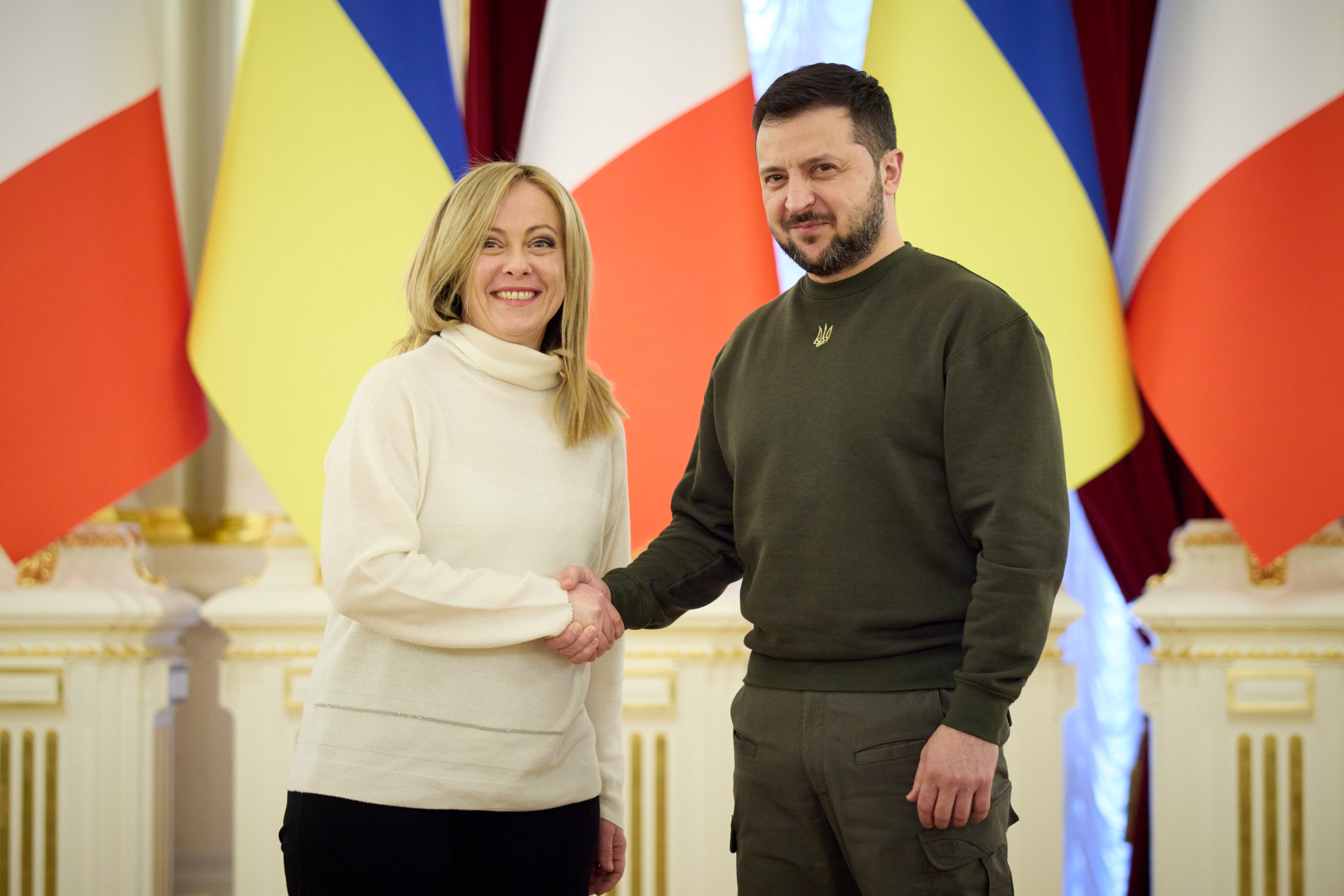
Volodymyr Zelenskyy meeting with Italian Prime Minister Giorgia Meloni on February 21, 2023

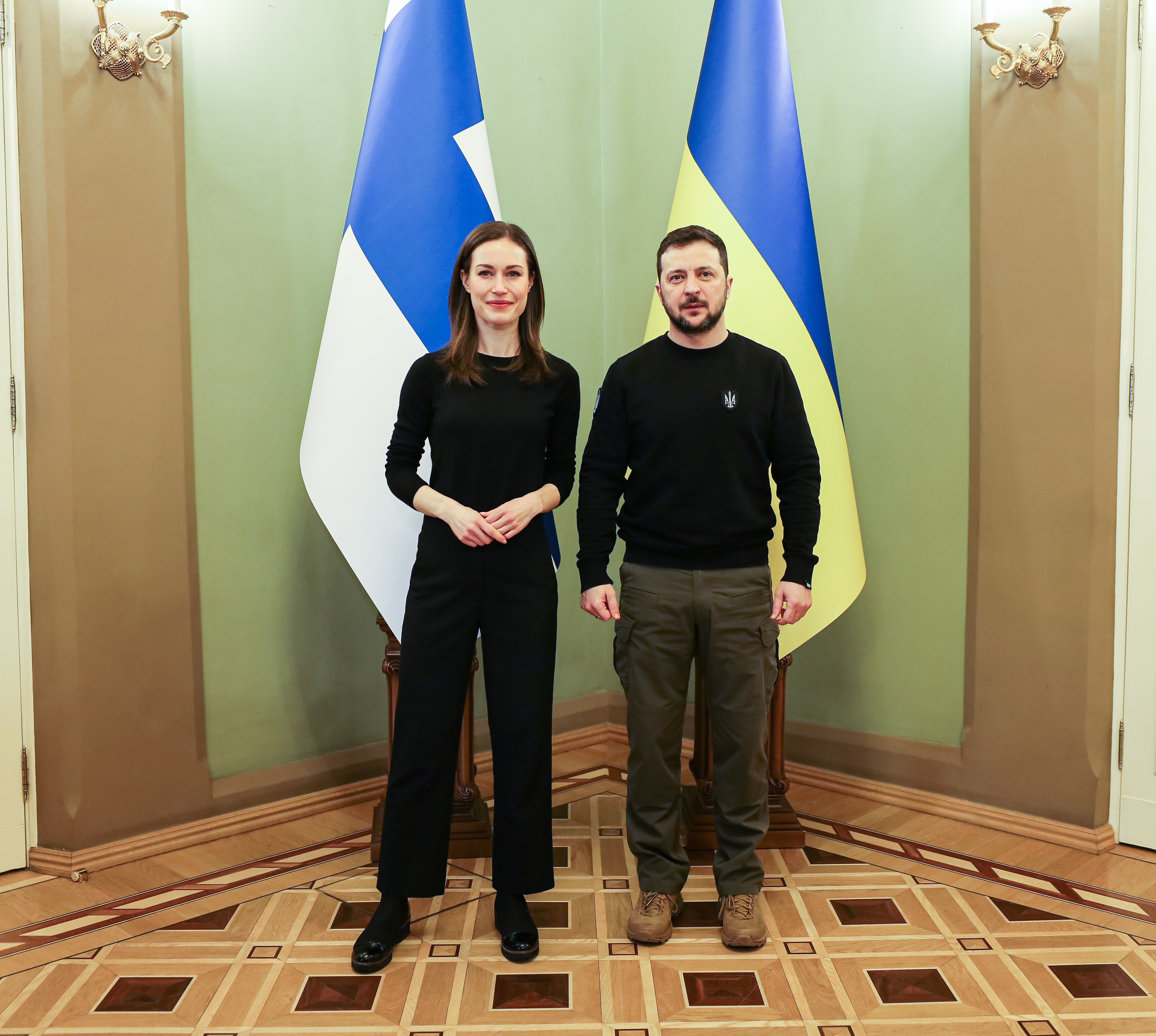
Volodymyr Zelenskyy meeting with Finnish Prime Minister Sanna Marin on March 10, 2023

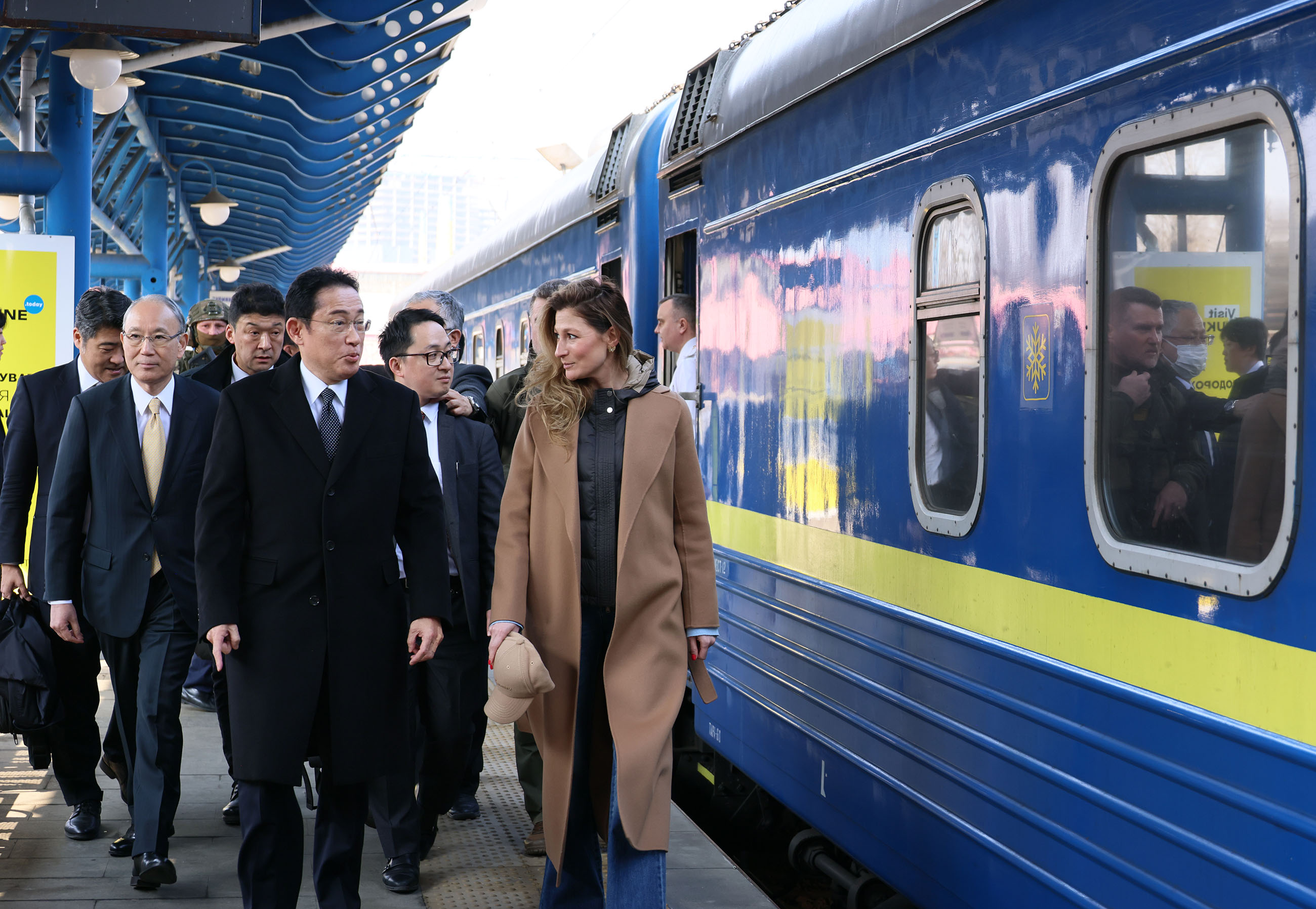
Prime Minister of Japan Fumio Kishida arriving by train in Kyiv on March 21, 2023

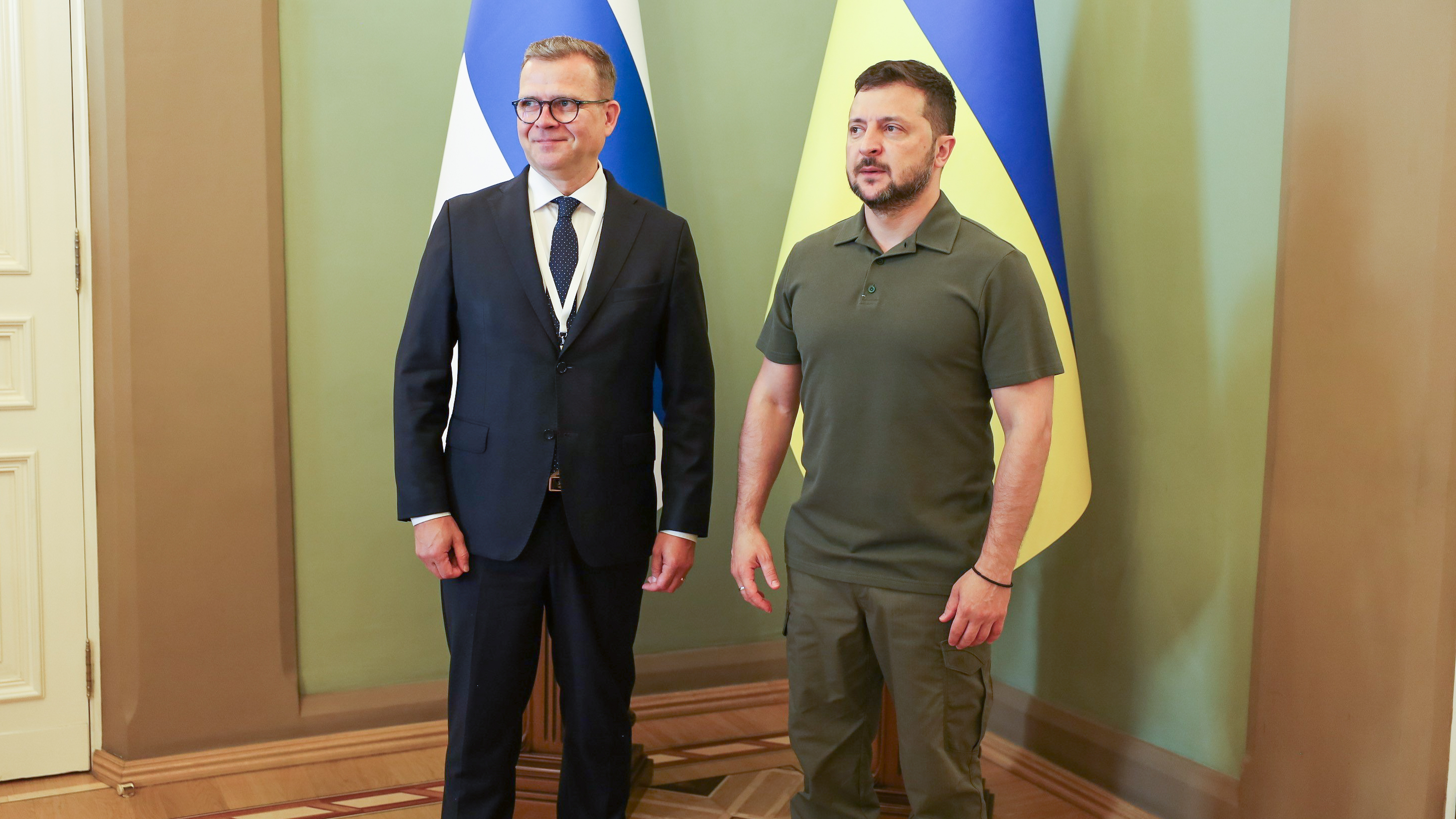
Finnish Prime Minister Petteri Orpo with Ukrainian President Volodymyr Zelenskyy in Kyiv, August 23, 2023

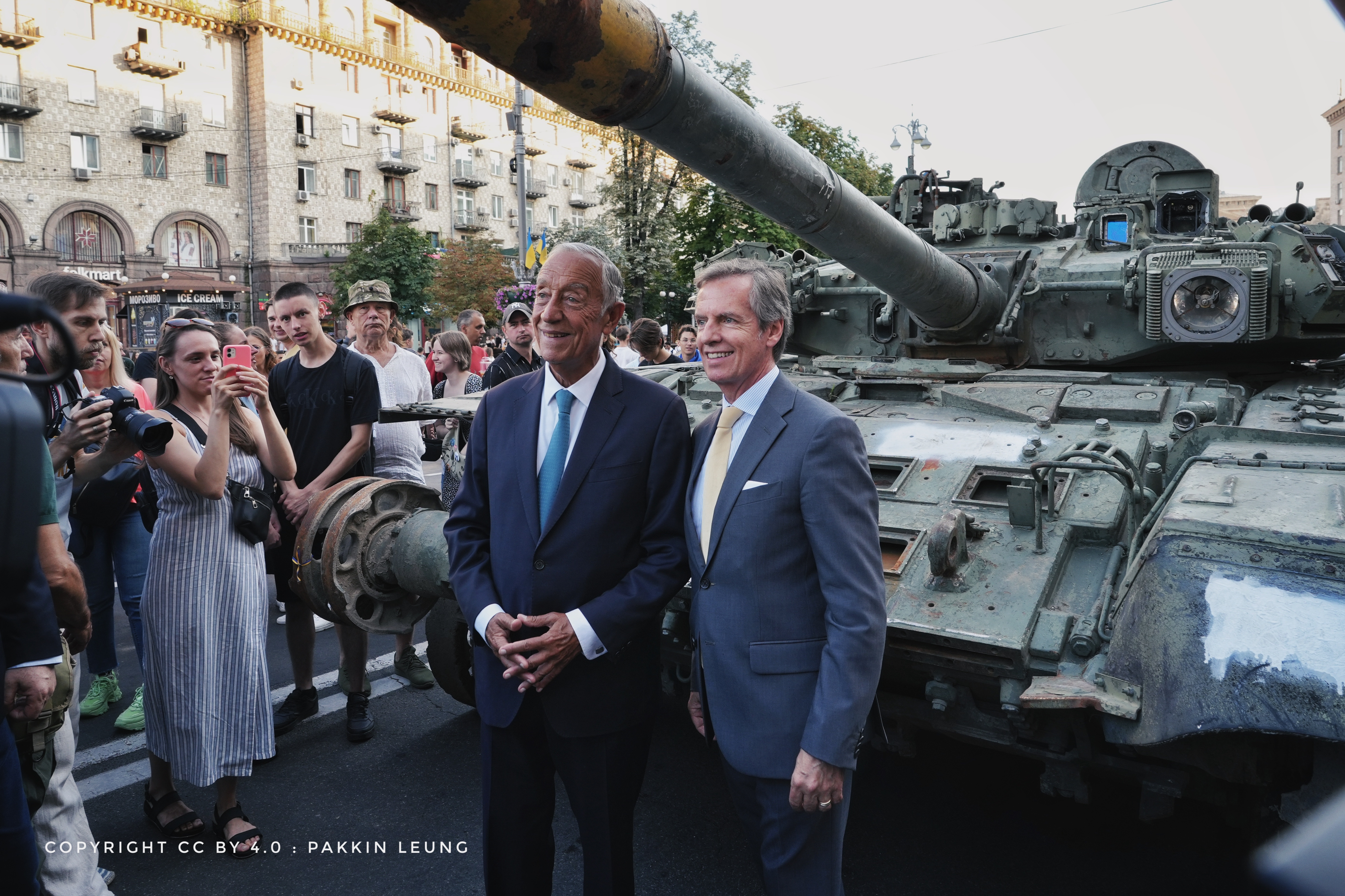
Portuguese President Marcelo Rebelo de Sousa visited Kyiv on August 23, 2023.

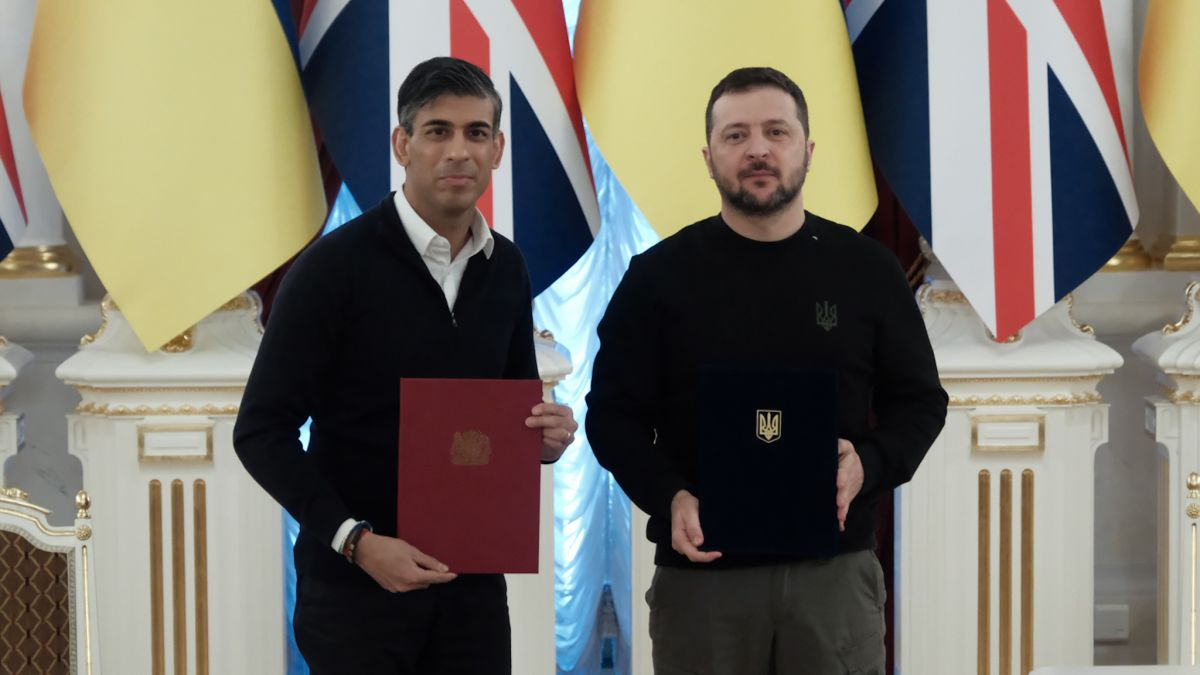
Volodymyr Zelenskyy meeting with British Prime Minister Rishi Sunak in Kyiv on January 12, 2024

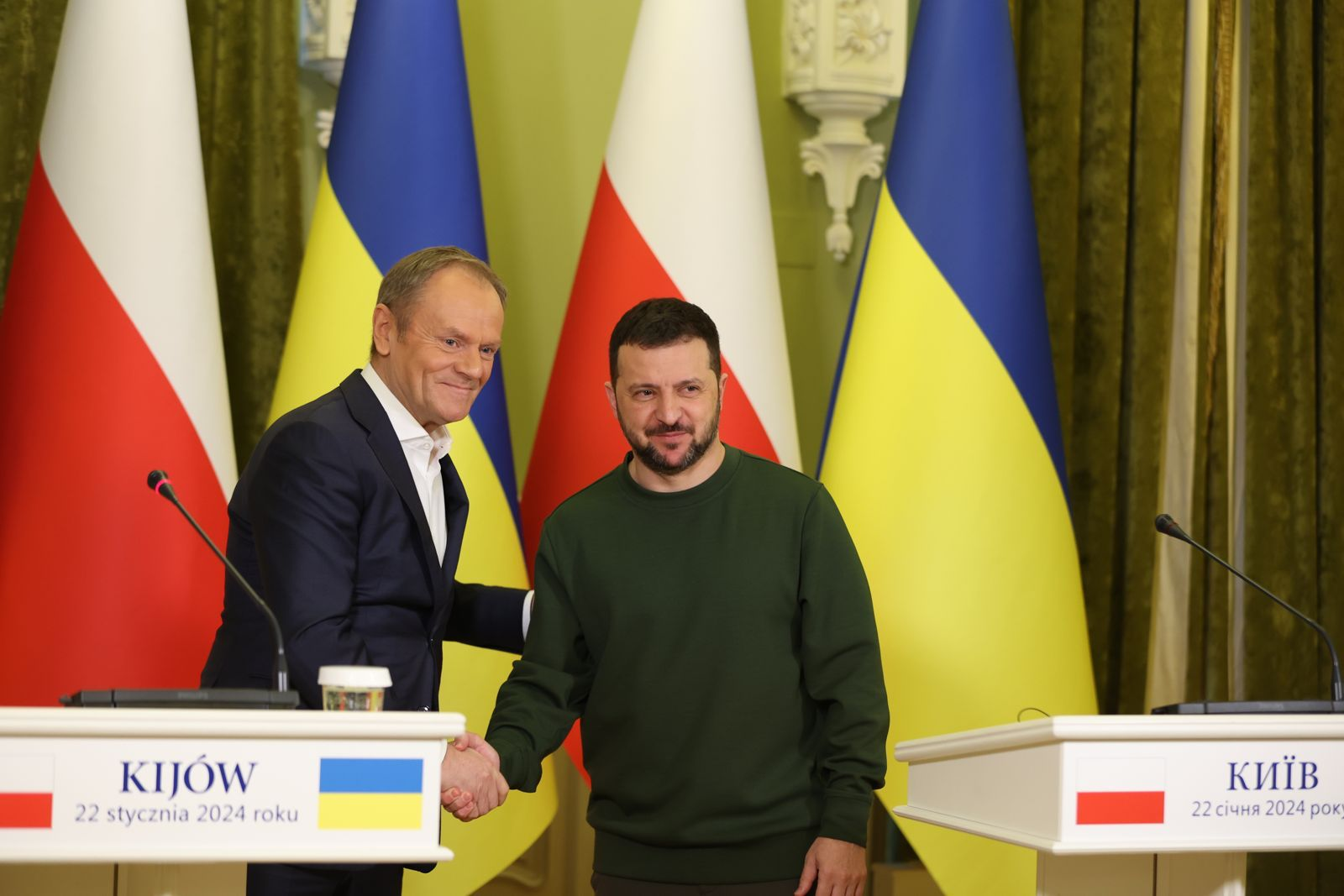
Polish Prime Minister Donald Tusk visited Kyiv on January 22, 2024.

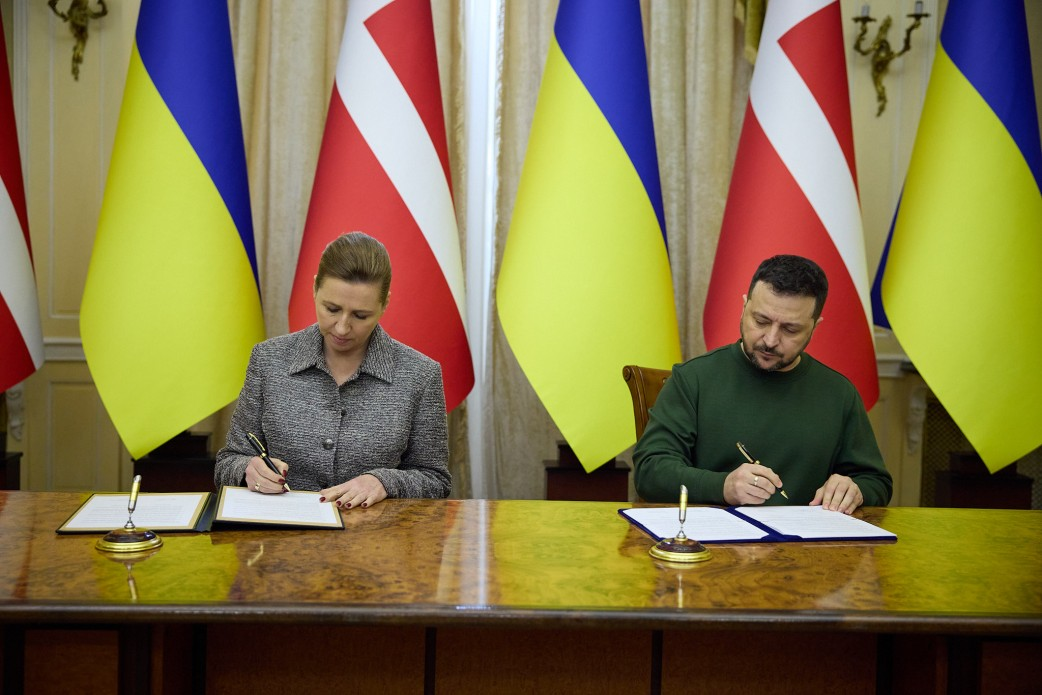
Danish Prime Minister Mette Frederiksen in Lviv on February 23, 2024

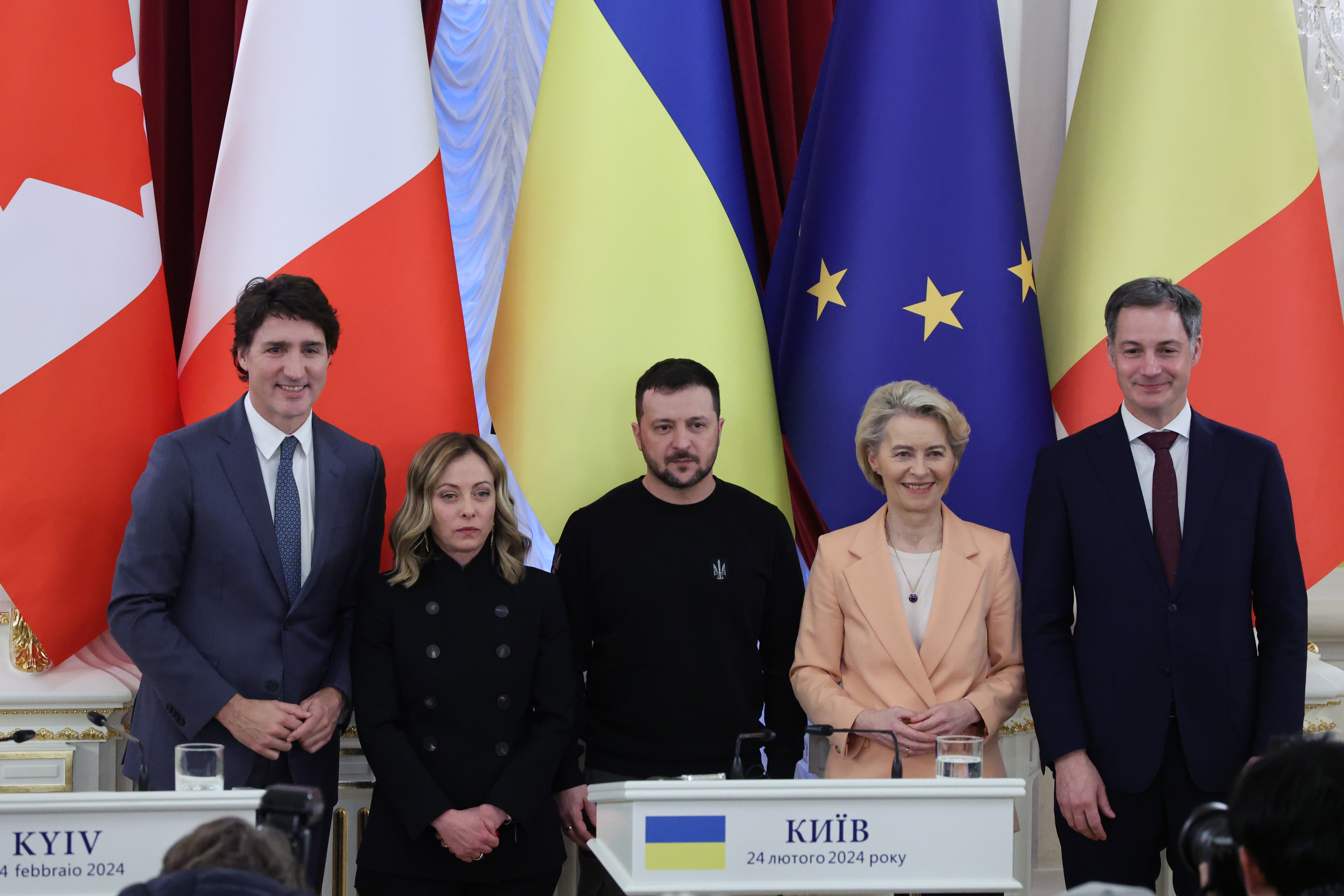
Canadian Prime Minister Justin Trudeau, Italian Prime Minister Giorgia Meloni and Belgian Prime Minister Alexander de Croo in Kyiv on February 24, 2024

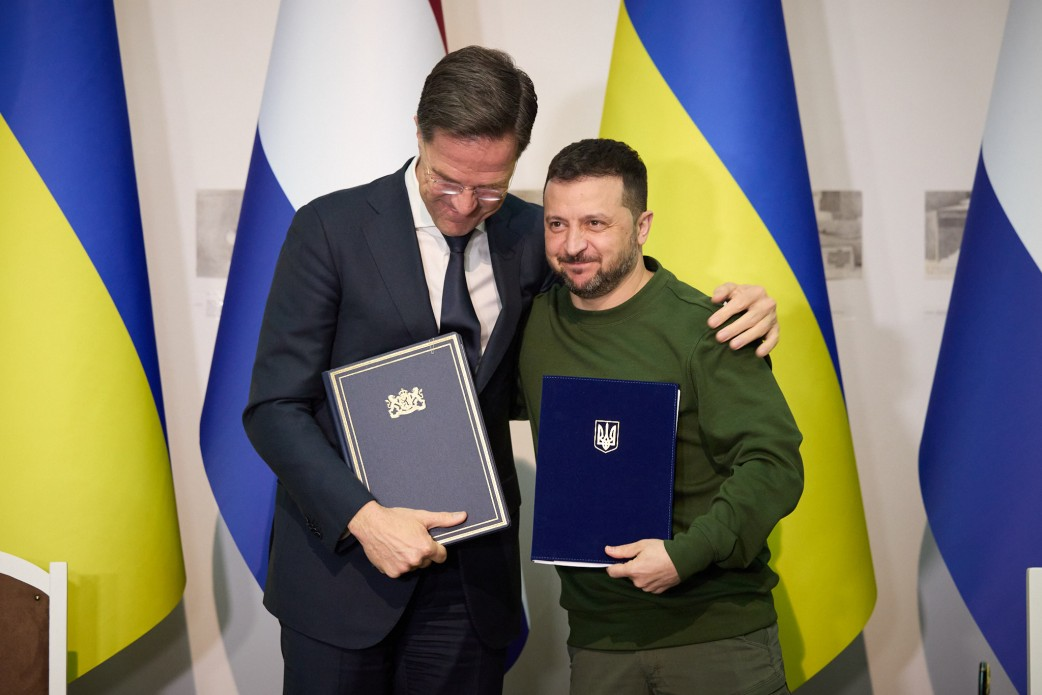
Dutch Prime Minister Mark Rutte in Kharkiv on March 1, 2024

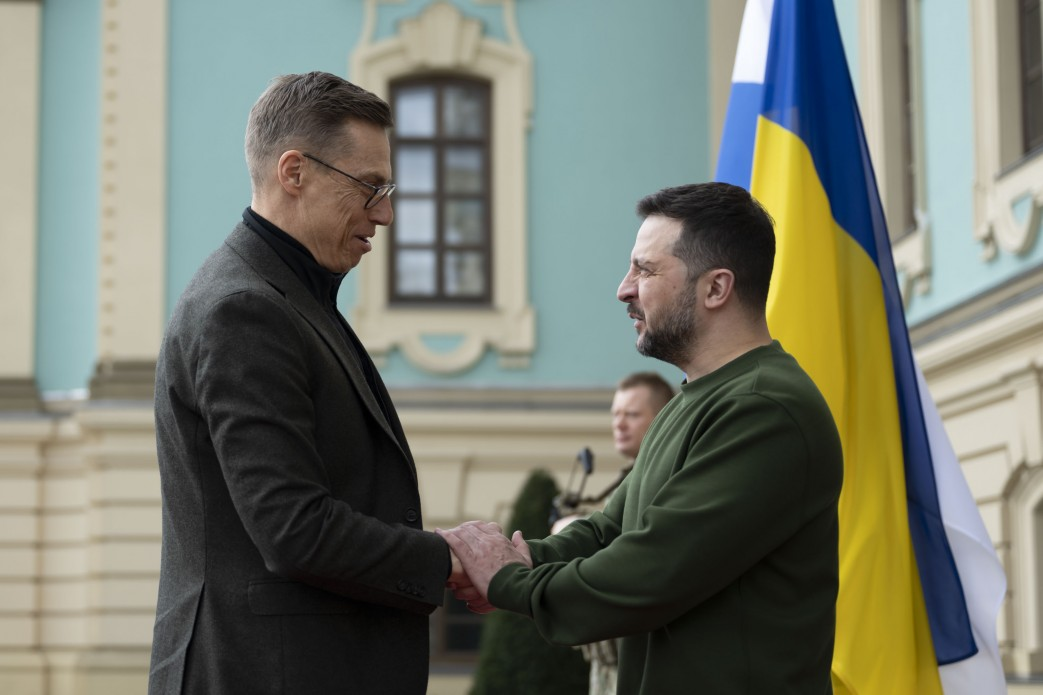
President of Finland Alexander Stubb in Kyiv on April 3, 2024

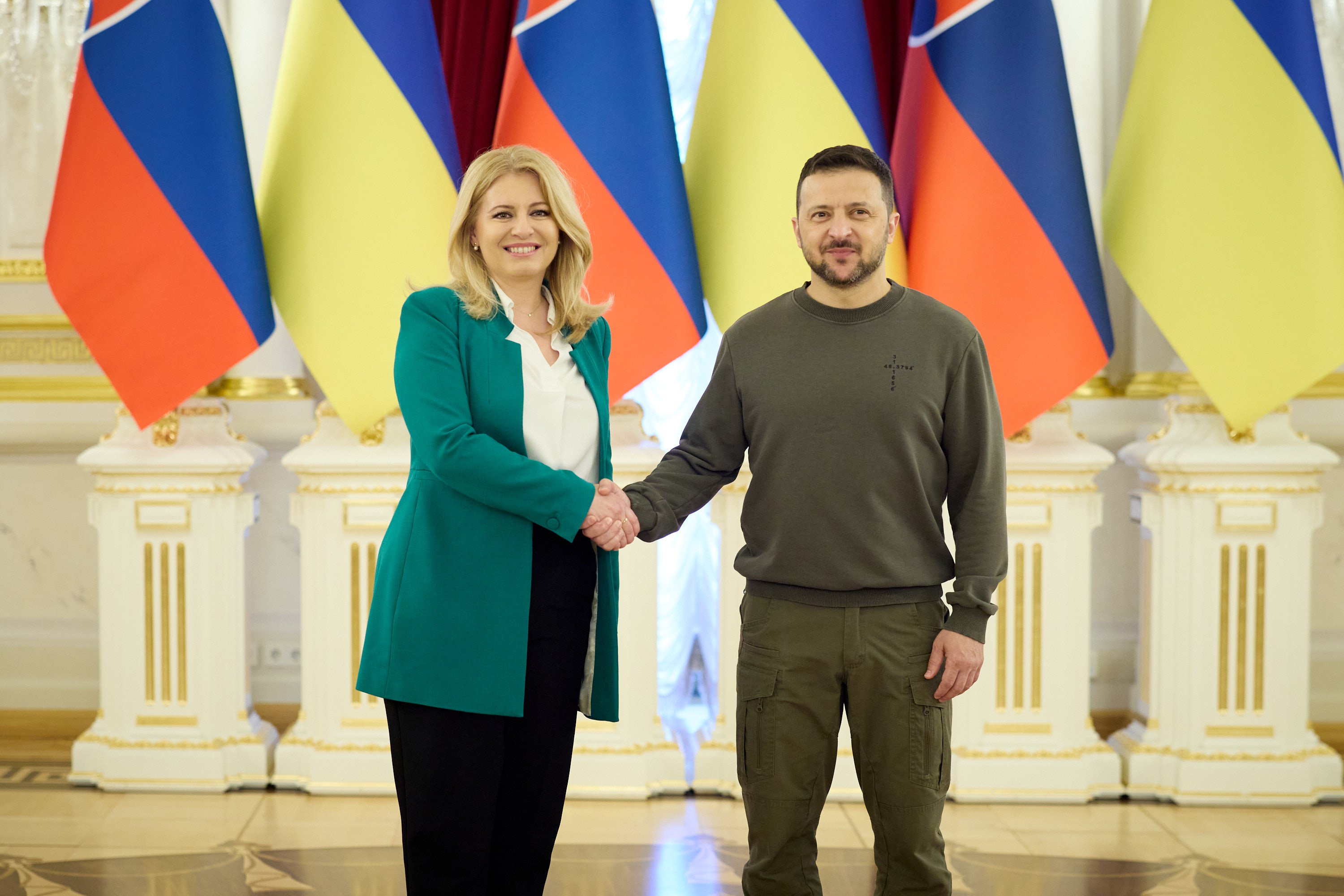
President of Slovakia Zuzana Čaputová in Kyiv on May 10, 2024

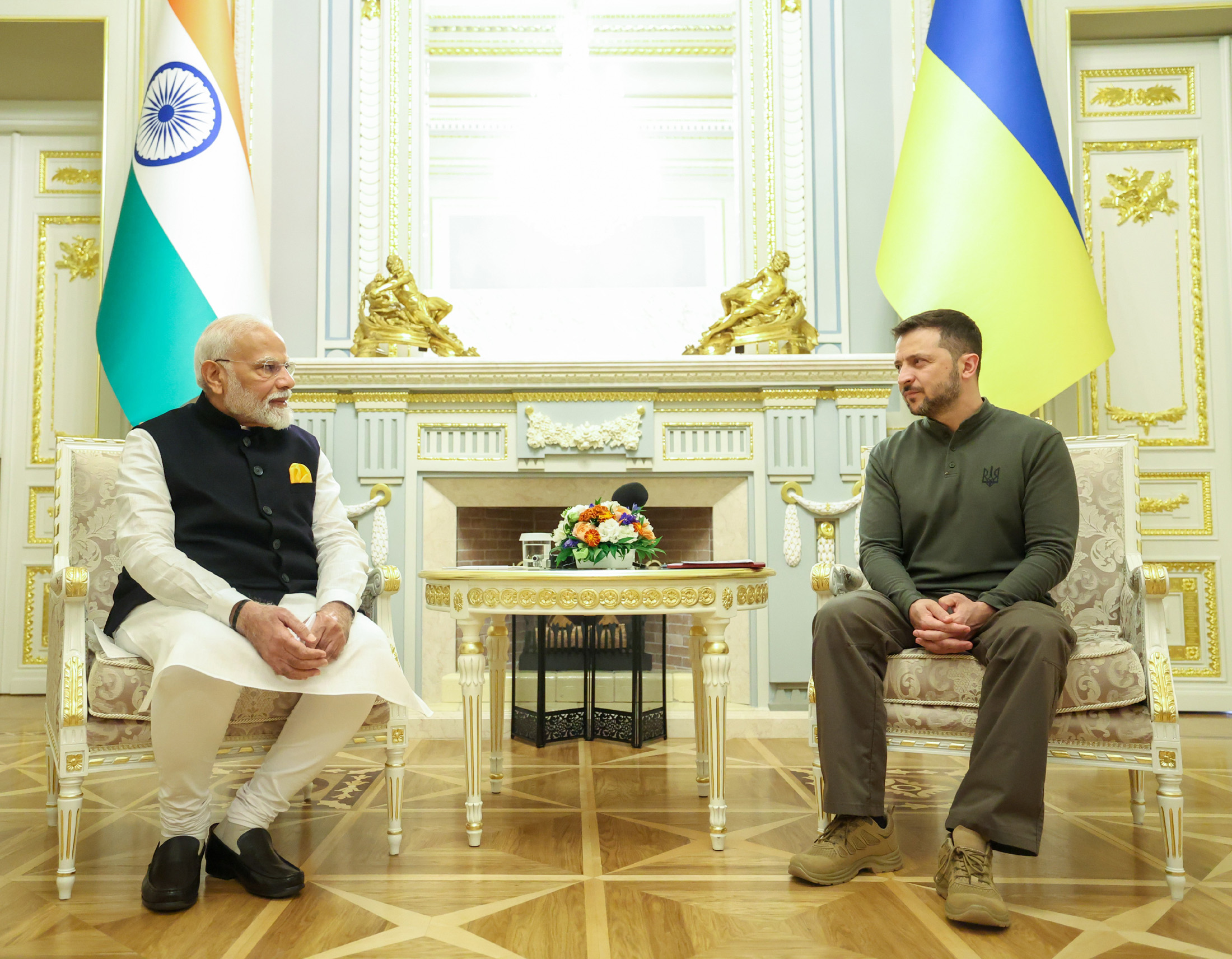
Indian Prime Minister Narendra Modi visited Kyiv on August 23, 2024.

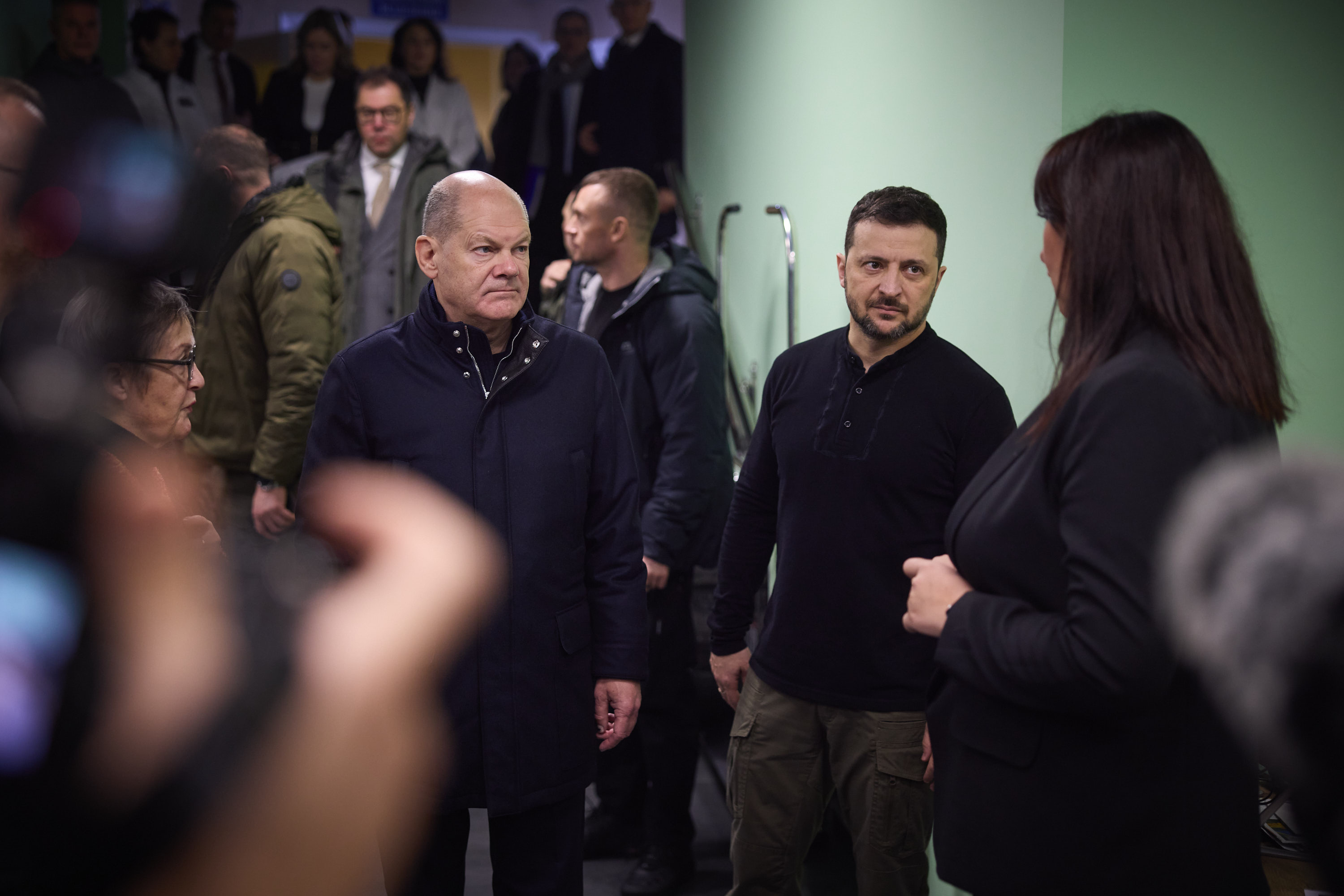
German Chancellor Olaf Scholz meets with Ukrainian President Volodymyr Zelenskyy in Kyiv, on December 2, 2024.

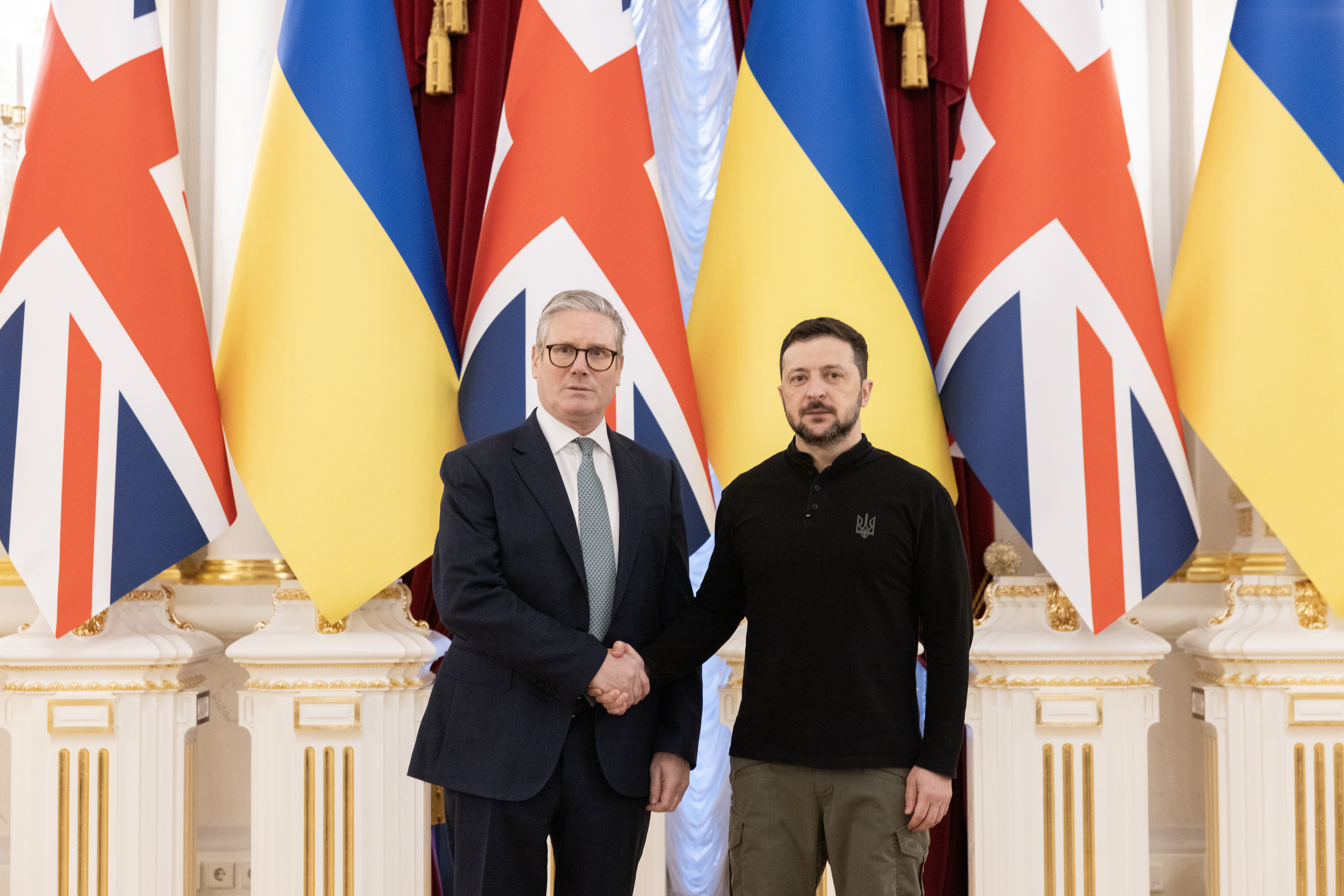
Volodymyr Zelenskyy meeting with British Prime Minister Keir Starmer in Kyiv on January 16, 2025

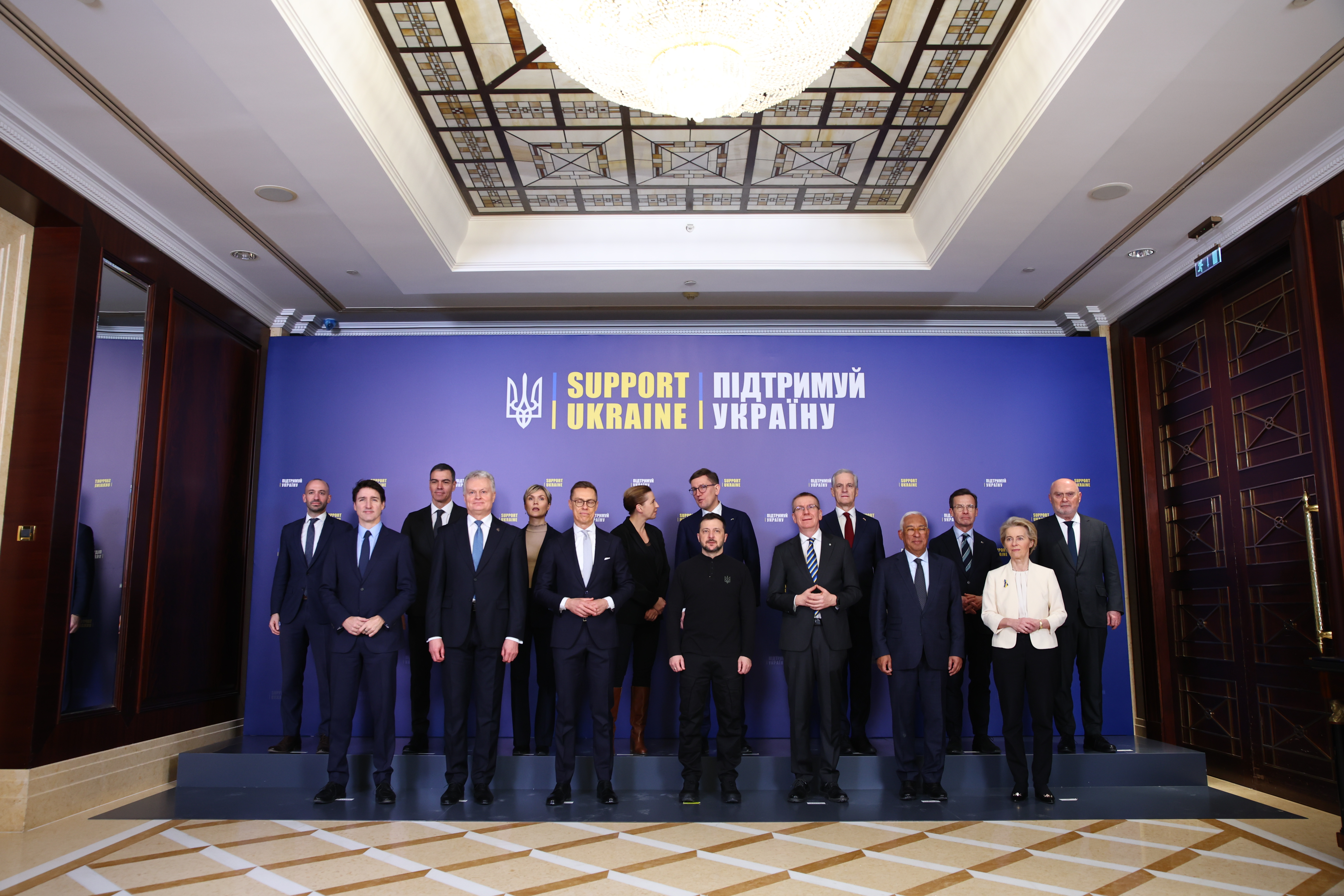
Canadian Prime Minister Justin Trudeau, Icelandic Prime Minister Kristrún Frostadóttir, Norwegian Prime Minister Jonas Gahr Støre, Danish Prime Minister Mette Frederiksen, Finnish President Alexander Stubb, Swedish Prime Minister Ulf Kristersson, Estonian Prime Minister Kristen Michal, Latvian President Edgars Rinkēvičs, Lithuanian President Gitanas Nausėda, Spanish Prime Minister Pedro Sánchez visited Kyiv on February 24, 2025.

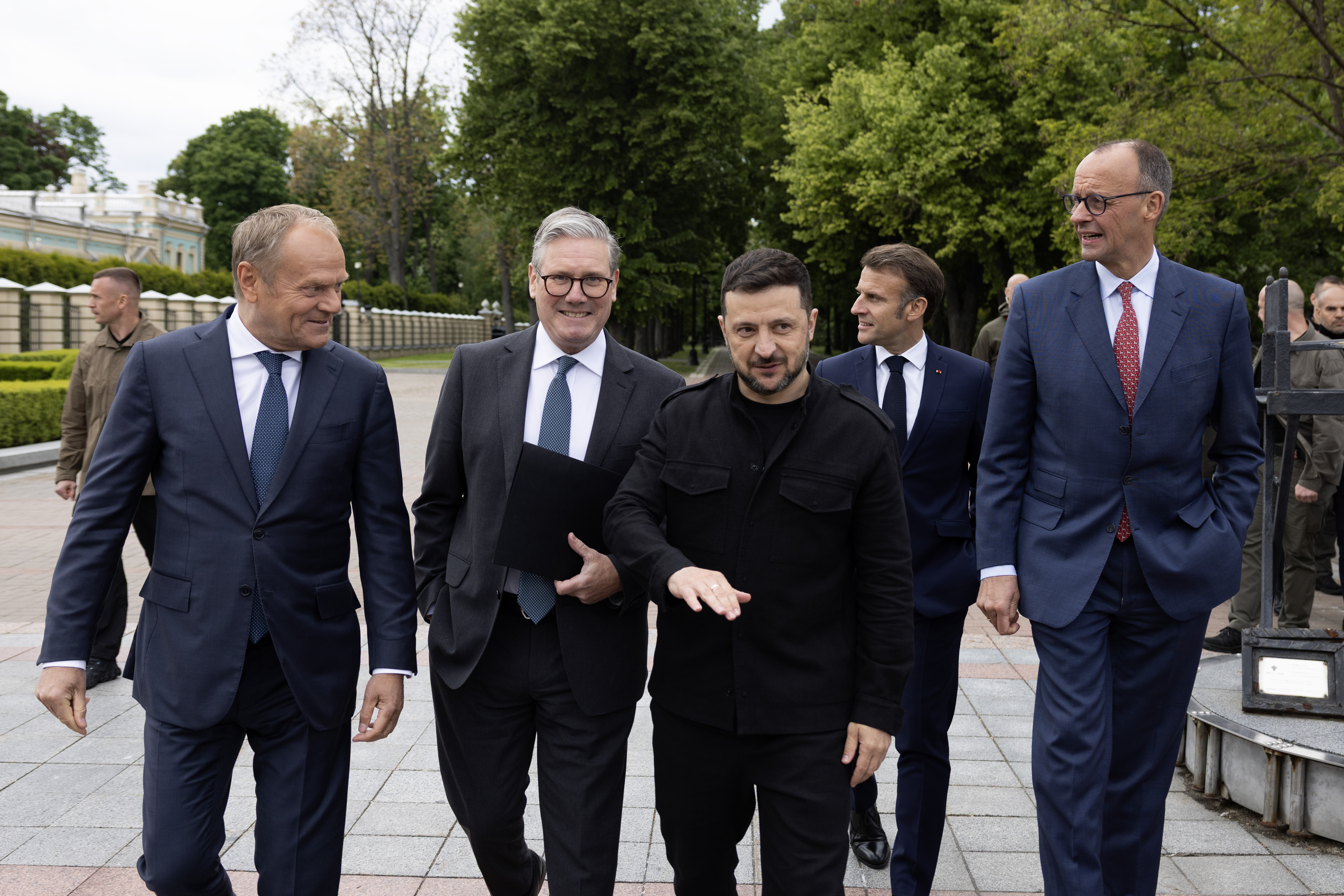
German Chancellor Friedrich Merz, French President Emmanuel Macron, British Prime Minister Keir Starmer and Polish Prime Minister Donald Tusk with Ukrainian President Volodymyr Zelenskyy visited Kyiv on May 10, 2025

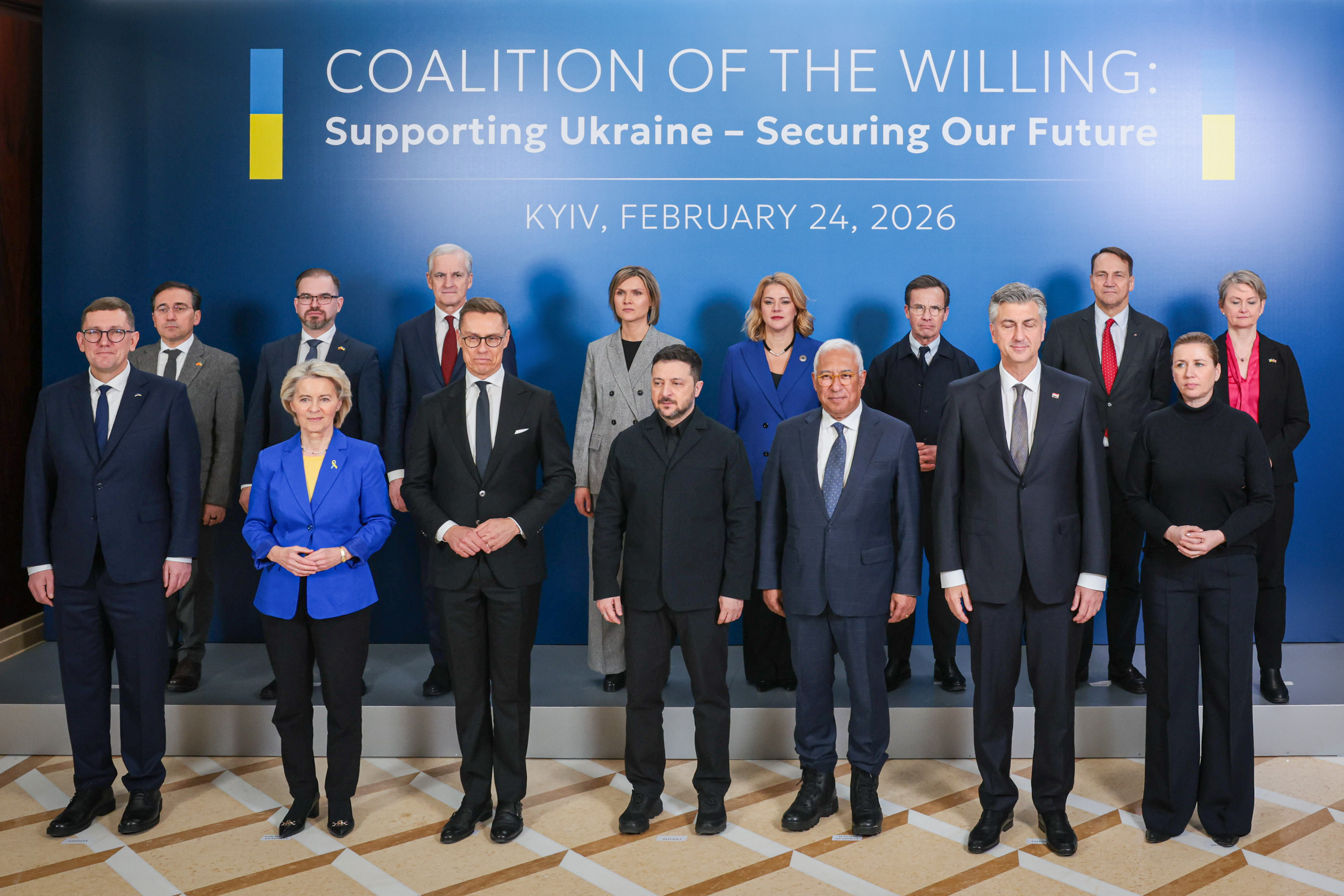
Coalition of the Willing meeting in Kyiv for the 4th anniversary of Ukraine invasion

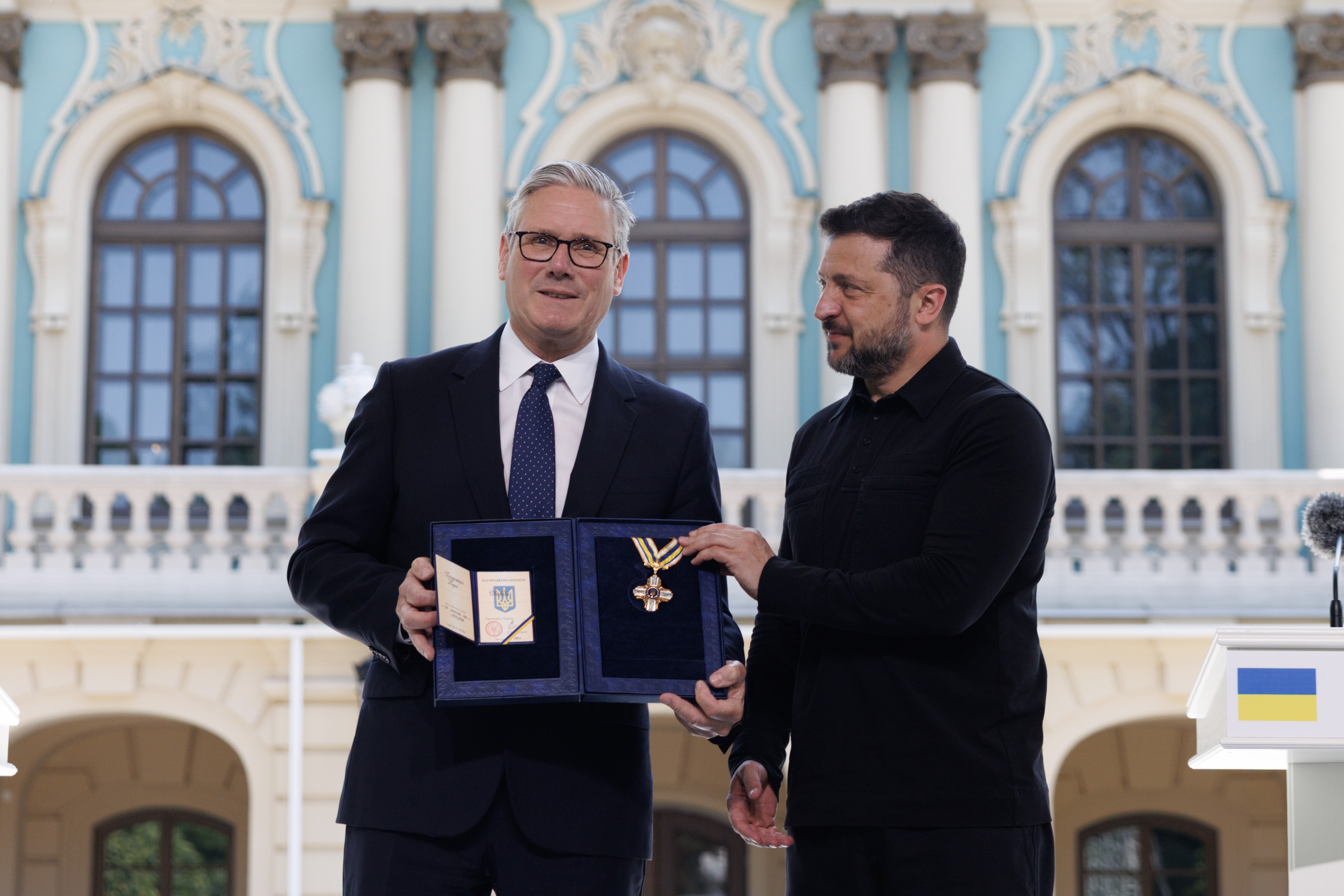
Volodymyr Zelenskyy meeting with British Prime Minister Keir Starmer in Kyiv on July 16, 2026

== See also ==
- Iron diplomacy
- List of heads of state and government who have visited Russia during the Russo-Ukrainian war (2022–present)
- List of international presidential trips made by Volodymyr Zelenskyy
- International reactions to the Gaza war
