= Senate district 60 – Brno-City =

Electoral district in the Czech Republic

60 – Brno-City
- inline Senate district of the Czech Republic

- The Brno-City district on a map
- Senator: Zdeněk Papoušek; ODS
- Region: South Moravia
- District: Brno-město
- Last election: 2026
- Next election: 2032

Senate district 60 – Brno-City is an electoral district of the Senate of the Czech Republic, located in part of the Brno-City District. Since the 2025 by-election in the district, Zdeněk Papoušek, a ODS nominee, is the senator for the district.

== Senators ==
Year	Senator	Party
1996	Jan Zahradníček	KDU-ČSL
2002	Jiří Zlatuška	"LIRA"
2008	Miloš Janeček	ČSSD
2014	Zdeněk Papoušek	KDU-ČSL
2020	Roman Kraus	ODS
2025	Zdeněk Papoušek	ODS
2026	Zdeněk Papoušek	ODS

== Election results ==
=== 1996 ===
1996 Czech Senate election in Brno-City
Candidate	Party	1st round	
Candidate	Party	Votes	%
Jan Zahradníček	KDU-ČSL	19 994	50,06
Jan Ráž	ČSSD	7 296	18,27
Josef Kůta	KSČM	5 498	13,77
Zdeněk Pánek	Independent	3 888	9,73
Jan Kopeček	MSLK_96	1 809	4,53
Petr Šuleř	ČSNS	1 455	3,64

=== 2002 ===
2002 Czech Senate election in Brno-City
Candidate	Party	1st round		2nd round	
Candidate	Party	Votes	%	Votes	%
Jiří Zlatuška	"LIRA"	7 592	24,30	20 069	57,85
Ivan Kopečný	ODS	8 299	26,56	14 620	42,14
Jan Zahradníček	KDU-ČSL	4 948	15,83	—	—
Dominik Šulc	ČSSD	4 362	13,96	—	—
Helena Sýkorová	KSČM	4 092	13,09	—	—
Jiřina Suchá	Your voice	1 371	4,38	—	—
Vladimír Baďura	ANEO	460	1,47	—	—
Ladislav Vašíček	SV SOS	117	0,37	—	—

=== 2008 ===
2008 Czech Senate election in Brno-City
Candidate	Party	1st round		2nd round	
Candidate	Party	Votes	%	Votes	%
Miloš Janeček	ČSSD	16 240	34,48	21 753	58,20
Petr Duchoň	ODS	13 552	28,77	15 622	41,79
Jiří Zlatuška	"LIRA"	9 063	19,24	—	—
Daniel Borecký	KSČM	4 077	8,65	—	—
Zdeněk Kolíbal	KDU-ČSL	3 196	6,78	—	—
Eliška Kovářová	SNK ED	964	2,04	—	—

=== 2014 ===
2014 Czech Senate election in Brno-City
Candidate	Party	1st round		2nd round	
Candidate	Party	Votes	%	Votes	%
Zdeněk Papoušek	KDU-ČSL	8 061	19,83	13 300	63,69
Karel Doležal	ČSSD	7 102	17,47	7 582	36,30
Jan Bobrovský	ODS	6 410	15,77	—	—
Karel Schmeidler	ANO 2011	6 049	14,88	—	—
Miloslava Pošvářová	SZ, Pirates	4 231	10,41	—	—
Michal V. Marek	TOP 09, STAN	3 834	9,43	—	—
Helena Sýkorová	KSČM	2 952	7,26	—	—
Miloš Janeček	Republika	1 540	3,78	—	—
Jiří Šoltys	OČR	457	1,12	—	—

=== 2020 ===
2020 Czech Senate election in Brno-City
Candidate	Party	1st round		2nd round	
Candidate	Party	Votes	%	Votes	%
Roman Kraus	ODS, TOP 09	9 661	21,84	11 036	57,71
Anna Šabatová	Greens, SEN 21, Idealisté	7 937	17,94	8 085	42,28
Karel Rais	ANO 2011	7 047	15,93	—	—
Jiří Kadeřávek	Pirates	6 505	14,70	—	—
Tomáš Tomáš	KDU-ČSL	5 920	13,38	—	—
Tomáš Anderle	SPD	2 786	6,29	—	—
Richard Novák	Tricolour	1 429	3,23	—	—
Pavel Trčala	MZH	1 391	3,14	—	—
Lukáš Berta	MHS	916	2,07	—	—
Bohuslav Chalupa	FOR Health	423	0,95	—	—
Oldřich Duchoň	NáS	209	0,47	—	—

=== 2025 (by-election) ===
2025 Czech Senate by-election in Brno-City
Candidate	Party	1st round	
Candidate	Party	Votes	%
Zdeněk Papoušek	ODS, KDU-ČSL, TOP 09, STAN, Pirates, Greens, Fakt Brno	11 788	59,40
Karin Podivinská	ANO 2011, SOCDEM	4 350	21,92
Petr Koš	SPD, Tricolour, PRO 2022	1 153	5,81
Pavel Trčala	MZH	1 150	5,79
Martin Hovorka	PŘÍSAHA	871	4,38
Milan Hamerský	KAN	530	2,67

=== 2026 ===
2026 Czech Senate election in Brno-City
Candidate	Party	1st round		2nd round	
Candidate	Party	Votes	%	Votes	%
Zdeněk Papoušek	ODS, TOP 09, KDU-ČSL, Pirates, Fakt Brno	19 395	42,08	12 051	65,78
Karel Zitterbart	STAN	11 269	24,45	6 268	34,21
Jaroslav Štěrba	ANO 2011	9 275	20,12	—	—
Jaroslav Turánek	SPD	2 892	6,27	—	—
Veronika Holcnerová	Kruh	1 896	4,11	—	—
Klára Alžběta Samková	Stačilo!	1 355	2,94	—	—
