= Gymnázium třída Kapitána Jaroše =

School in Brno, Czech Republic

Coordinates: 49.2021°N 16.6113°E

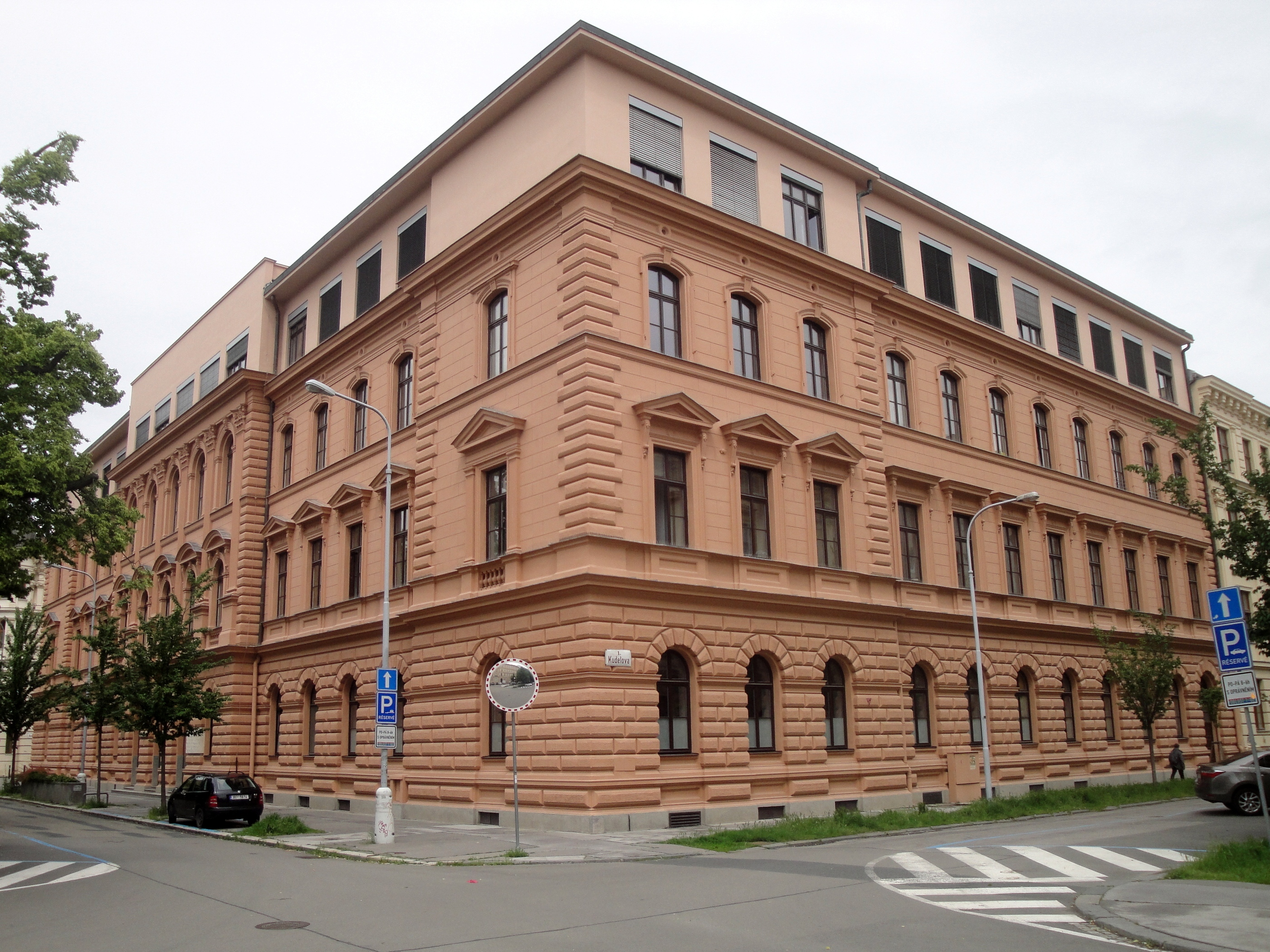

Information
- Established: 1867; 159 years ago
- Website: www.jaroska.cz

Gymnázium třída Kapitána Jaroše (historically known as the 1st Czech Gymnasium of Brno; commonly known as Jaroška) is a public gymnasium in Brno, Czech Republic.

== History ==
Founded in 1867 as Slovanské gymnázium, the school is the oldest Czech-language gymnasium in Moravia, alongside the gymnasium in Olomouc. The school was originally located in a building on Na Hradbách street (now Rooseveltova 13), moving to its current premises in a neo-Renaissance building at třída Kapitána Jaroše 14 on 18 September 1884.

In 1984 the school was designated as a specialized mathematics academy. Between the years 1992 and 2002, 30 of the 66 representatives of the Czech Republic in the International Mathematical Olympiad were students of the school.

== Notable alumni ==
Notable former staff and students at the school include:

=== Staff ===
- František Bartoš (1837–1906), linguist and ethnographer, taught at the school in 1869–1888.
- Vladimír Šťastný (1841–1910), priest and poet, taught theology at the school in 1867–1900.
- František Koláček (1851–1913), physicist, taught at the school in 1873–1891

=== Students ===
- Alfons Mucha (1860–1939), artist
- Vilém Mrštík (1863–1912), writer
- Petr Bezruč (1867–1958), poet and short story writer
- Karel Absolon (1877–1960), archaeologist and speleologist
- Karel Čapek (1890–1938), author and journalist
- Lev Blatný (1894–1930), poet
- Ondřej Sekora (1899–1967), painter and author
- Růžena Vacková (1901–1982), art historian
- Ivan Blatný (1919–1990), poet
- Zdeněk Rotrekl (1920–2013), poet
- Felix Maria Davídek (1921–1988), Roman Catholic bishop
- Jan Novák (1921–1984), composer
- Josef Koukl (1926–2010), Roman Catholic Bishop of Litoměřice
- Milan Kundera (1929-2023), novelist
- Jiří Zlatuška (born 1957), politician
- Petr Fiala (born 1964), politician, prime minister of the Czech Republic
- Petr Zelenka (born 1967), film director
- Pavel Blatný (born 1968), chess grandmaster
- Jaroslav Suchý (born 1971), figure skater and politician
- Kateřina Mrázová (born 1972), figure skater
- Martin Špinar (born 1972), footballer
- Radka Kovarikova (born 1975), figure skater
- Danuše Nerudová (born 1979), economist and politician
- Kateřina Tučková (born 1980), writer
- Jakub Hrůša (born 1981), conductor
- Mario Holek (born 1986), footballer
