= 2024 Civic Democratic Party leadership election =

Czech political party leadership election

- 13 April 2024
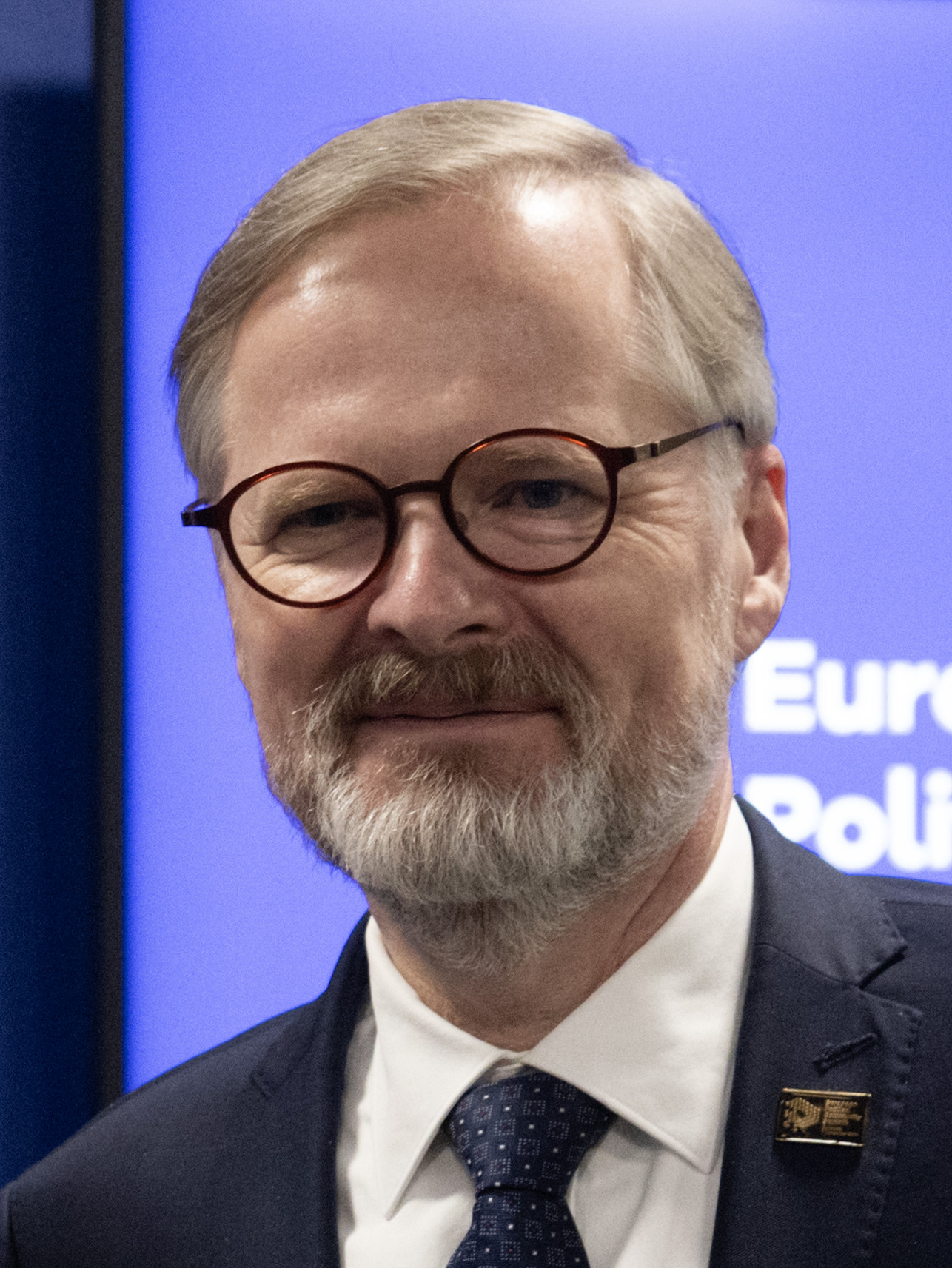
| Candidate | Petr Fiala |
| Electoral vote | 424 |
| Percentage | 81% |
Leader of ODS before election
Petr Fiala
Elected Leader of ODS
Petr Fiala

The Civic Democratic Party (ODS) held a leadership election on 13 April 2024. Petr Fiala was re-elected for sixth term which would expire in 2026. In 2025, Fiala became the longest serving leader of ODS.

== Background ==
Petr Fiala has been the leader of the party since 2014. Party formed an electoral alliance with KDU-ČSL and TOP 09, under the name Spolu. Spolu received 27.8% of votes in the 2021 Czech parliamentary election and finished first. As a result, Fiala became Prime Minister of the Czech Republic, and subsequently confirmed his candidacy. Fiala was then confirmed as a leader of the party in 2022 leadership election.

Election was held in Ostrava on 13 April 2024. Fiala was the sole candidate who received nominations from all regional organisations.

== Candidates ==
- Petr Fiala, the incumbent leader.

== Voting ==
Voting was held in Clarion Hotel, Ostrava. 539 delegates are allowed to vote. The incumbent leader Fiala ran unopposed. Fiala stated that he doesn't intend to leave the country for populists and extremists. Fiala received 424 votes from 523 delegates and was elected for his sixth term.

| Candidate | Vote | % |
|---|---|---|
| Petr Fiala | 424 | 81.07% |
| Against | 77 | 14.72% |
| Invalid | 22 | 4.21% |
