= 2022 ANO 2011 leadership election =

- 12 February 2022
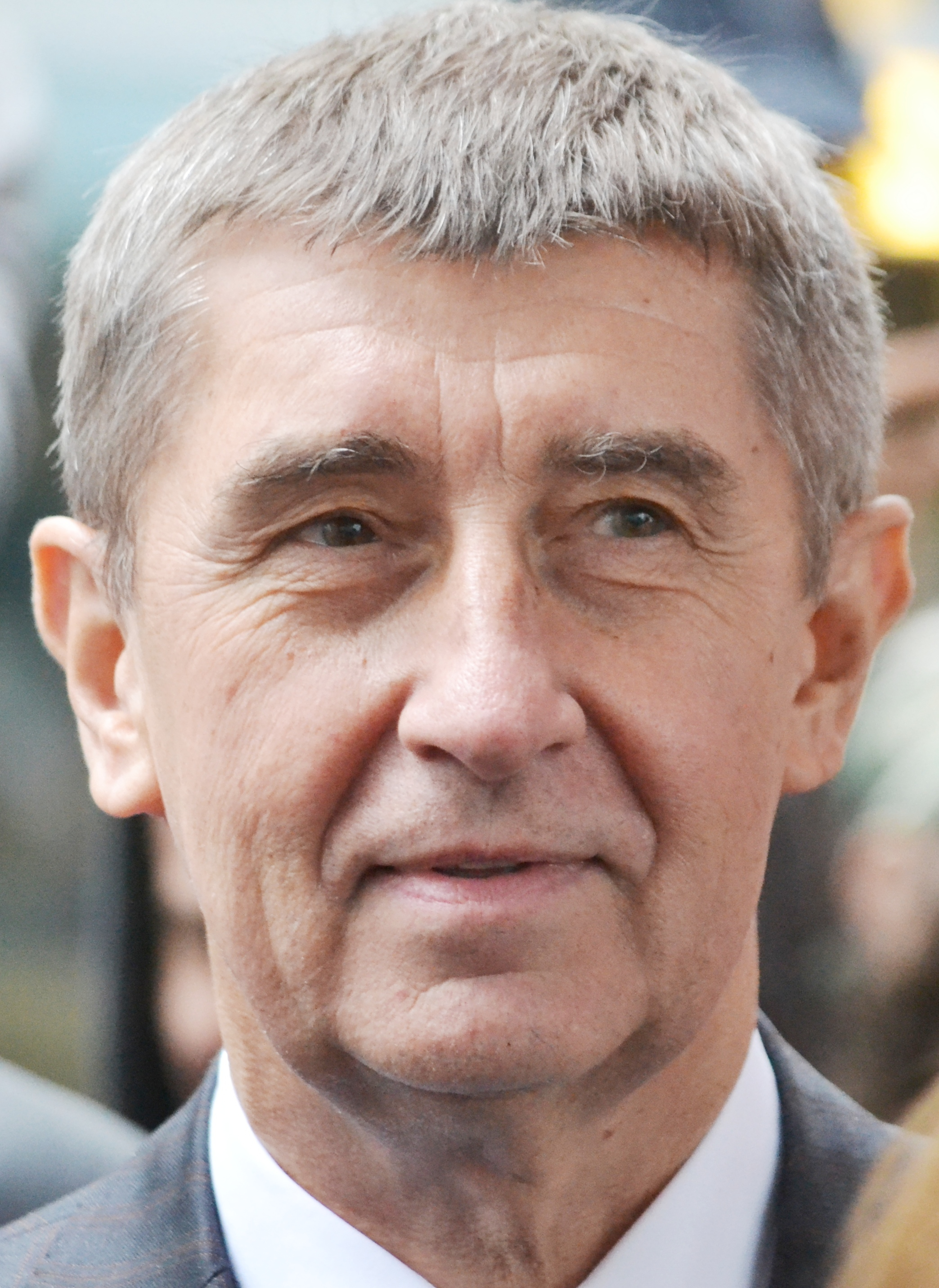
Candidate	Andrej Babiš
Electoral vote	76
Percentage	80%
leader of ANO 2011 before election
Andrej Babiš
Elected leader of ANO 2011
Andrej Babiš

The leadership election for ANO 2011 was held on 12 February 2022. It was originally set to be held in February 2021 but was postponed due to COVID-19 pandemic in the Czech Republic. The incumbent leader Andrej Babiš is expected to run unopposed. In February 2021 the election was postponed by one year till February 2022.

== Background ==
Andrej Babiš led the party since establishment of the party in 2011. Under his leadership the party won 2017 parliamentary election and Babiš became Prime Minister of the Czech Republic. Last leadership election was held in 2019. Next election was set for February 2021 but had to be delayed due to COVID-19 pandemic with no date set initially. It was then decided that leadership election will be delayed by one year and will occur in February 2022. In 2021 ANO lost next parliamentary election and was relegated to opposition.

Babiš decided to run for another term. He received 14 regional nominations. Babiš stated that he doesn't intend to run for reelection 2024 and doesn't intend to participate in 2025 parliamentary election.

== Candidates ==
- Andrej Babiš, former Prime Minister of the Czech Republic and incumbent leader. He already confirmed his candidacy.

== Voting ==
95 delegates were allowed to vote. Babiš was the only candidate. In his candidate speech he confirmed that he is running for the last time and noted that party needs to find a new face who will lead the party in 2025 parliamentary election. Babiš stated that his main priorities for his last term as the party leader is contact with citizens and work in Shadow cabinet. Babiš received 76 votes and thus was reelected.

Result
Candidate	Votes	%
Andrej Babiš	76	80%
Abstained	13	13.68%
Against	6	6.32%

== Aftermath ==
Prime Minister Petr Fiala congratulated Babiš for his victory stating that he hopes that ANO 2011 will work as a constructive opposition.
