= 2018 Civic Democratic Party leadership election =

Czech political party leadership election

- 13 January 2018
- Turnout: 92.5%
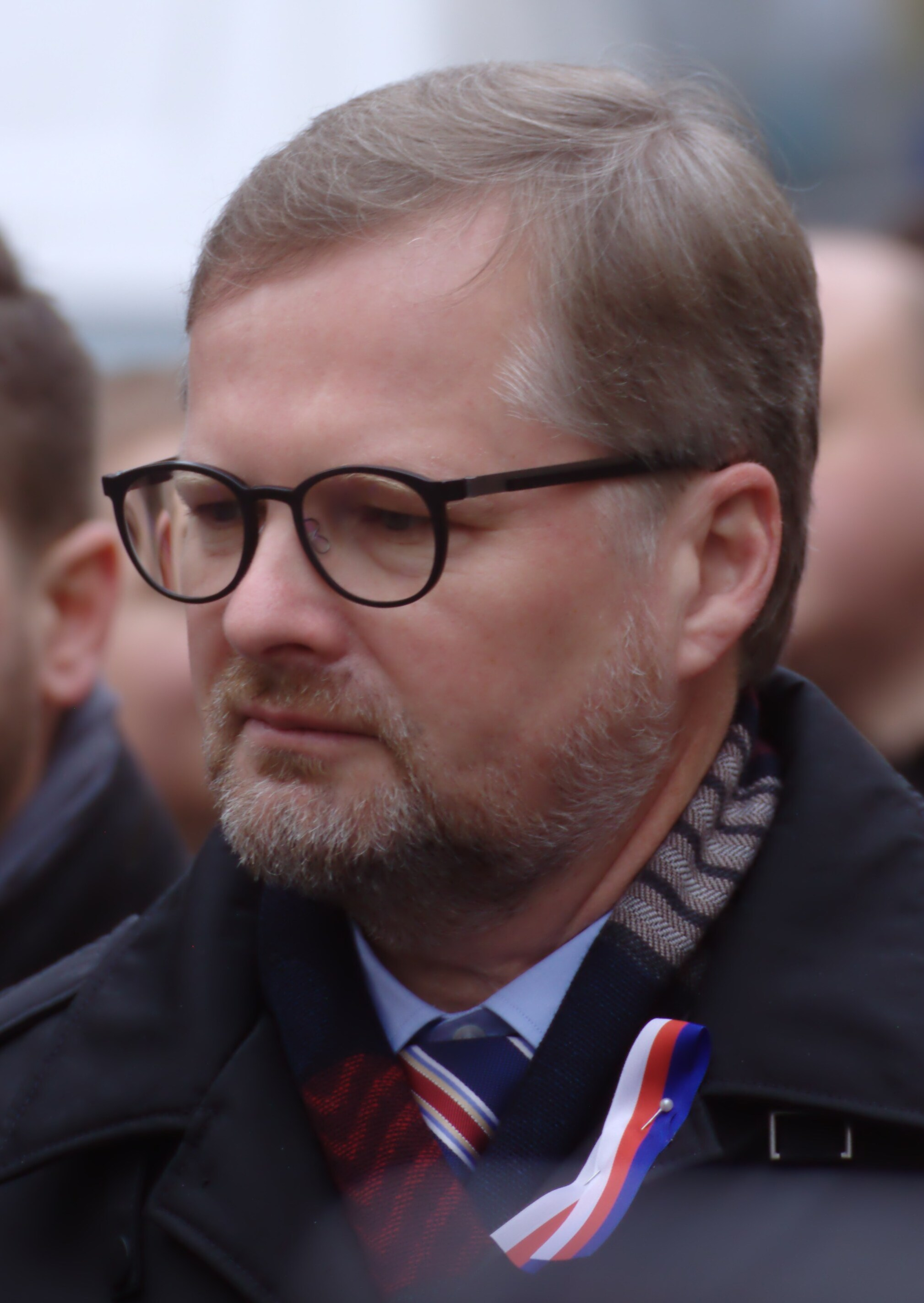
Candidate	Petr Fiala
Electoral vote	451
Percentage	93.4%
Leader of ODS before election
Petr Fiala
Elected Leader of ODS
Petr Fiala

A Civic Democratic Party (ODS) leadership election was held on 13 January 2018. The incumbent leader Petr Fiala sought reelection. Shadow Minister of Education Václav Klaus Jr. was widely expected to run against Fiala. He was considered to be one of the most visible politician of the party. In December 2016, Czech bookmaker company Fortuna wrote a course for Klaus Jr. to replace Fiala on 20:1. Klaus Jr.. decided to not run against Fiala. Approximately 540 delegates were allowed to vote. Fiala received 451 votes and was elected for another term.

== Candidates ==
- Petr Fiala - The incumbent leader of ODS might seek reelection. He is considered to be more of a "Chairman unifier" than his possible rival Klaus Jr. Fiala leads the party since 2014.

=== Refused ===
- Václav Klaus Jr. - Shadow Minister of education and son of Václav Klaus, the founder and the first leader of ODS. He was widely expected to run. He was considered to be the most visible politician of the party. He is more Eurosceptic than Fiala. Klaus believes that ODS should be closer a protest party. Some prominent politicians of ODS expressed support for him. He himself stated that his candidature depends on his result during 2017 legislative election. Klaus Jr. decided to not run.

== Background ==
Previous election was held in 2016. Petr Fiala was elected for second term. Fiala's education advisor Václav Klaus Jr. rejoined the party in January 2017. Klaus' father is a founder and the first leader of ODS and speculations that Klaus Jr. will become a rival to Fiala started. The leadership election will be held after 2017 legislative election. The result of the leadership election is expected be influenced by the legislative election.

Jaroslav Kubera stated on 14 August 2017 that 2018 leadership election will depend on party's result in 2017 legislative election. Kubera believes that if ODS receives less than 10%, Fiala will definitely be replaced as the leader. On 6 October 2017, Fiala stated that he doesn't intend to resign if ODS gets less than 10%.

ODS eventually received over 11% of votes and came second. The result was received positively in the party. Václav Klaus Jr. on the other hand stated that 11% is a poor result that doesn't give the party a chance to uphold its ideas and also means that ODS will remain in opposition. Fiala himself stated that he will most likely seek reelection.

On 23 October 2017, Klaus Jr. stated that he believes he has a friendly relationship with Fiala and voices saying that he is Fiala's opponent are false On 5 November 2017, Vysočina regional organisation of ODS nominated Petr Fiala for the position of leader. Klaus Jr. ruled out his candidacy on 29 November 2017. Fiala received nomination from Prague organisation on the same day. On 1 December 2017, Fiala received nomination from Ústí regional organisation. Central Bohemian organisation gave nomination to Fiala on 2 December 2017. Liberec region gave its nomination for Fiala on 6 December 2017. On 18 December 2017, Fiala received nomination from Olomuc regional organisation. Petr Fiala attended a congress of Hradec Králové organisation of the party. He thanked members of the organisation for their work and stated that fight for survival of ODS is finished. Fiala then received nomination from the congress. South Bohemian ODS held a congress on 8 January 2018. It endorsed Fiala. The leader of South Bohemian ODS Martin Kuba stated that Fiala helped to get ODS from problems it had in 2013. He believes ODS doesn't have a persona that could replace Fiala. Fiala himself attended congress of Plzeň region organisation and received its nomination.

== Voting ==
Candidate	Vote	%
Petr Fiala	451	93.37%
Against	32	7.63%

Fiala received nominations from all 14 regional organisations of the party and was the only candidate. Fiala talked about 2018 presidential election in his candidacy speech and stated that he wants Czech people to vote. He also warned against populist and stated that ODS should attract voters with ideas and a right-wing program. Of 544 delegates, 503 attended party's congress and thus participated in the election. Fiala needed to receive at least 252 votes. He received 451 votes of 483. 12 votes were invalid while 8 delegates didn't vote.
