= Pavel Mezlík =

Czech footballer

Personal information
- Date of birth: 25 June 1983 (age 43)
- Place of birth: Třebíč, Czechoslovakia
- Height: 1.78 m (5 ft 10 in)
- Position: Midfielder

Youth career
- 1991–1995: FC Rudíkov
- 1995–1998: Horácká Slavia Třebíč
- 1998–1999: FC Zbrojovka Brno

Senior career*
Years	Team	Apps	(Gls)
1999–2007	FC Zbrojovka Brno	72	(5)
2006	FC Hradec Králové (loan)	11	(2)
2007	Vysočina Jihlava (loan)	14	(0)
2008–2011	SK České Budějovice	81	(5)
2012–2015	FC Zbrojovka Brno	34	(6)
2015–2016	FK Blansko	16	(4)
- * Club domestic league appearances and goals as of 30 September 2020

Pavel Mezlík (born 25 June 1983) is a Czech football player.

Mezlík started his football career in Rudíkov. In 1998, he moved to FC Zbrojovka Brno. On 22 May 1999, at the age of 15, he appeared in a league match against FC Karviná, becoming the youngest player in the history of Gambrinus liga. He played in Brno until 2008, with the exceptions of loans at FC Hradec Králové and Vysočina Jihlava in 2006 and 2007. In 2008 he moved to SK Dynamo České Budějovice where he plays to date.

Mezlík played for Czech youth national teams since the under-15 level.
