= 2022 Civic Democratic Party leadership election =

Czech political party leadership election

- 9 April 2022
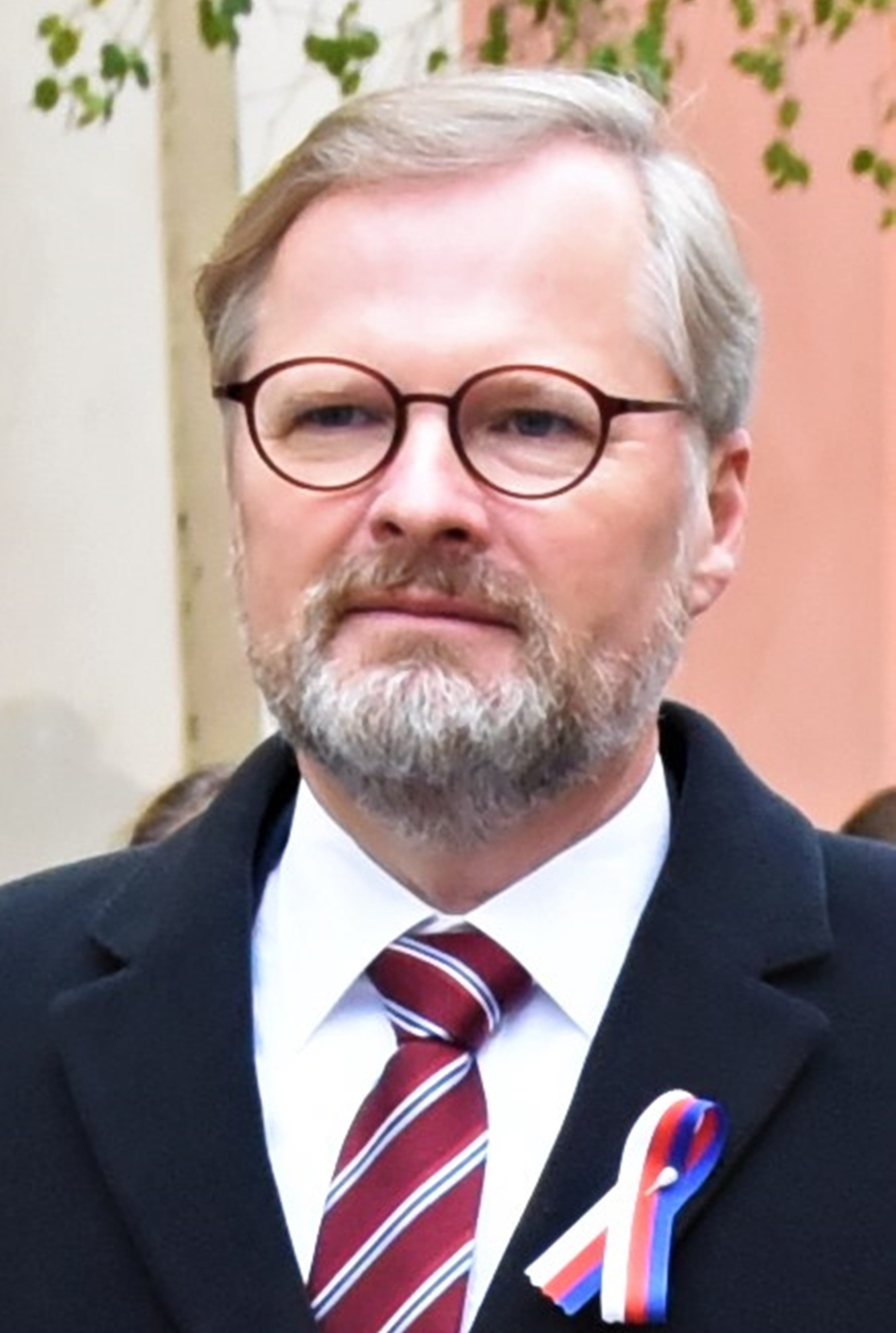
Candidate	Petr Fiala
Electoral vote	510
Percentage	95.5%
Leader of ODS before election
Petr Fiala
Elected Leader of ODS
Petr Fiala

The Civic Democratic Party (ODS) held a leadership election on 9 April 2022, following the 2021 Czech parliamentary election.

== Background ==
Petr Fiala has been the leader of the party since 2014. Leadership elections are held every two years. Fiala was reelected for a fourth term in 2020, but his reelection was overshadowed by the defeat of his Deputy Leader Alexandra Udženija and the candidacy of controversial politician Pavel Novotný for Deputy leader. Support for ODS in opinion polls stagnated during 2020, and Fiala decided to form an electoral alliance with KDU-ČSL and TOP 09, under the name Spolu. It was reported that some members of ODS did not agree with the alliance. Martin Kuba, the Governor of the South Bohemian Region, expressed his opposition to the alliance in January and February 2021. Kuba received widespread media attention during the COVID-19 pandemic, triggering tabloid speculation that he would eventually replace Fiala.

SPOLU received 27.8% of votes in the 2021 Czech parliamentary election and finished first. As a result Fiala became Prime Minister of the Czech Republic, and subsequently confirmed his candidacy. The election was scheduled for 15 January 2022, but was postponed till Spring 2022 due to the COVID-19 pandemic.

== Candidates ==
- Petr Fiala, the incumbent leader. In December 2021, after the 2021 Czech parliamentary election, he confirmed that he would stand again as leader.

=== Speculative ===
- Martin Kuba, Governor of South Bohemian region. Kuba's media profile increased during the COVID-19 pandemic, triggering speculation that he would replace Fiala as the leader of ODS.

== Voting ==
The vote was set for 9 April 2022, with more than 600 voting delegates gathering in O2 universum Centre. Fiala was the sole candidate. Fiala acknowledged during his nomination speech that many voters had chosen ODS as a lesser evil, and said the party should keep that in mind. He said that voters had decided to give the party another chance and ODS could not afford to disappoint them. He also noted as a success of his leadership that ODS had returned to the position of senior government party. Fiala won reelection with 510 of 534 votes. 24 votes were invalid.

Candidate	Vote	%
Petr Fiala	510	95.51
Invalid	24	4.49%
