= 2004 Masaryk University Rector election =

- 22 October 2004
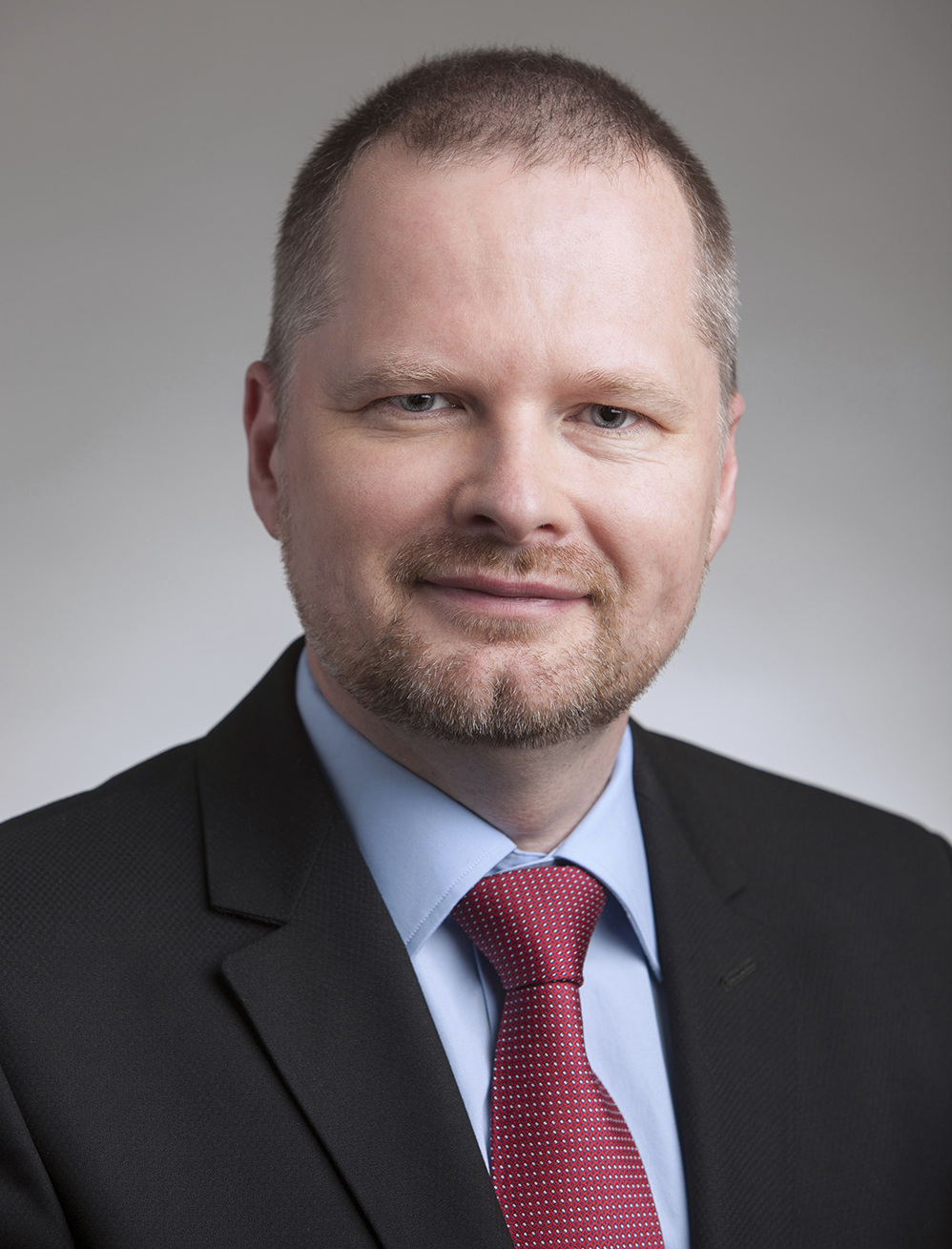

Candidate	Petr Fiala	Jan Wechsler
Electoral vote	27	17
Percentage	61.36	38.64
Rector before election
Jiří Zlatuška
Elected Rector
Petr Fiala

The Masaryk University Rector election, 2004 was held in April 2004. Incumbent rector Jiří Zlatuška was ineligible to run. Dean of the Faculty of Social Studies Petr Fiala was elected new Rector. Fiala was the youngest elected Rector in the history of University.

== Background ==
Jiří Zlatuška was rector since 1998. He was ineligible to run for another term. Three candidates decided to run - Dean of the Faculty of Social Studies Petr Fiala, Professor of Medicine Jan Wechsler and Student Václav Linkov. Linkov's candidacy drew attention of media as he was viewed as a recessist candidate. Linkov's electoral promises included foundation of Department of erotic studies and buying Air Fighter. Election was viewed as a duel between Fiala and Wechsler. Fiala was indirectly endorsed by Zlatuška.

== Election ==
First and second round was held on 20 April 2004. Wechsler received 19 votes against Fiala's 17 votes. Linkov withdraw from candidacy during his speech noting that his rivals are more competent. Both Fiala and Wechdler received 18 votes in second round. Candidate needed 24 votes to be elected as 31 of 46 members of academic senate were present. Election was thus unsuccessful. Date of third round was set for 26 April 2004.

Third round was held on 26 April 2004. Fiala received 27 votes against Wechsler's 17 votes and won the election. In 2007 Fiala was elected for second term and remained in the position until 2011 when it expired.
