= Vladimír Šťastný =

Czech priest and poet

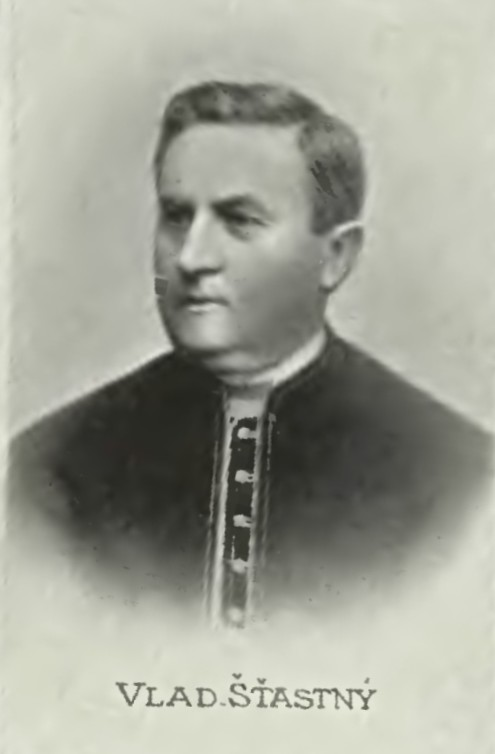

Vladimír Šťastný (17 March 1841, Rudíkov – 20 August 1910, Brno) was a Czech priest and poet. He is also known under the pseudonym Josef Ruda. After studying theology, he was chaplain in Židlochovice and a prefect at the Brno bishop seminary. After that he taught at the 1st Czech Gymnasium in Brno. He was the founder of the magazine Obzor (Horizon) and the chief executive of the Literature association of the heritage of Saint Cyril and Metoděj.

== Works ==
- Kvítí májové (May Flowers) – 1869
- Kytka z Moravy (A Flower from Moravia) – 1879
- Drobné květy (Small Flowers) – 1887
- Hlasy a ohlasy (Voices and echoes) – 1892
- Hory a doly (Mountains and Mines) – 1894
