= Pravý břeh – Institut Petra Fialy =

Czech think tank

Pravý Břeh Institut Petra Fialy
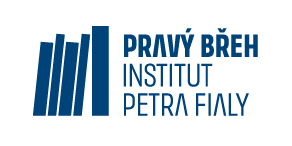
- Type: Think tank
- Editor: Petr Dvořák
- Founded: 2013; 13 years ago
- Political alignment: Conservative
- Headquarters: Prague
- Website: www.pravybreh.cz

Pravý Břeh (lit. 'Right bank') is a conservative think tank based in the Czech Republic. It is a formed by a group of intellectuals with an objective to think, propose and implement reforms that are in par with the ideals of the right wing thinkers. The name right bank is coined taking into consideration the objectives of right wing, that are in contrast with the objectives of the left wing. It produces an eponymous online newspaper.

== History ==
Pravý Břeh was established in April 2013, with an objective to review the essential requirements and issues with a view of conservative liberalism. Its founder was Andrew Rykl, who died in July 2014. It was relaunched in 2016 in a new form, with its objective now being not only to deliver opinions but also to analyse the ideologies within the think tank and to be weighed against it rivals for their progress. This new form of Pravý Břeh was dedicated to its founder, Rykl.

In June 2016, Pravý Břeh decided to move a step further and associate itself with a representative of the Czech right and the Civic Democratic Party (ODS) chairman, Petr Fiala. Fiala is a strong advocate in bringing in reforms and is proficient in designing strategies for Pravý Břeh.

Pravý Břeh believes that governments are catering to interests of other nations rather than meeting the requirements of their own citizens.
