= František Bartoš (folklorist) =

Czech ethnomusicologist (1837–1906)

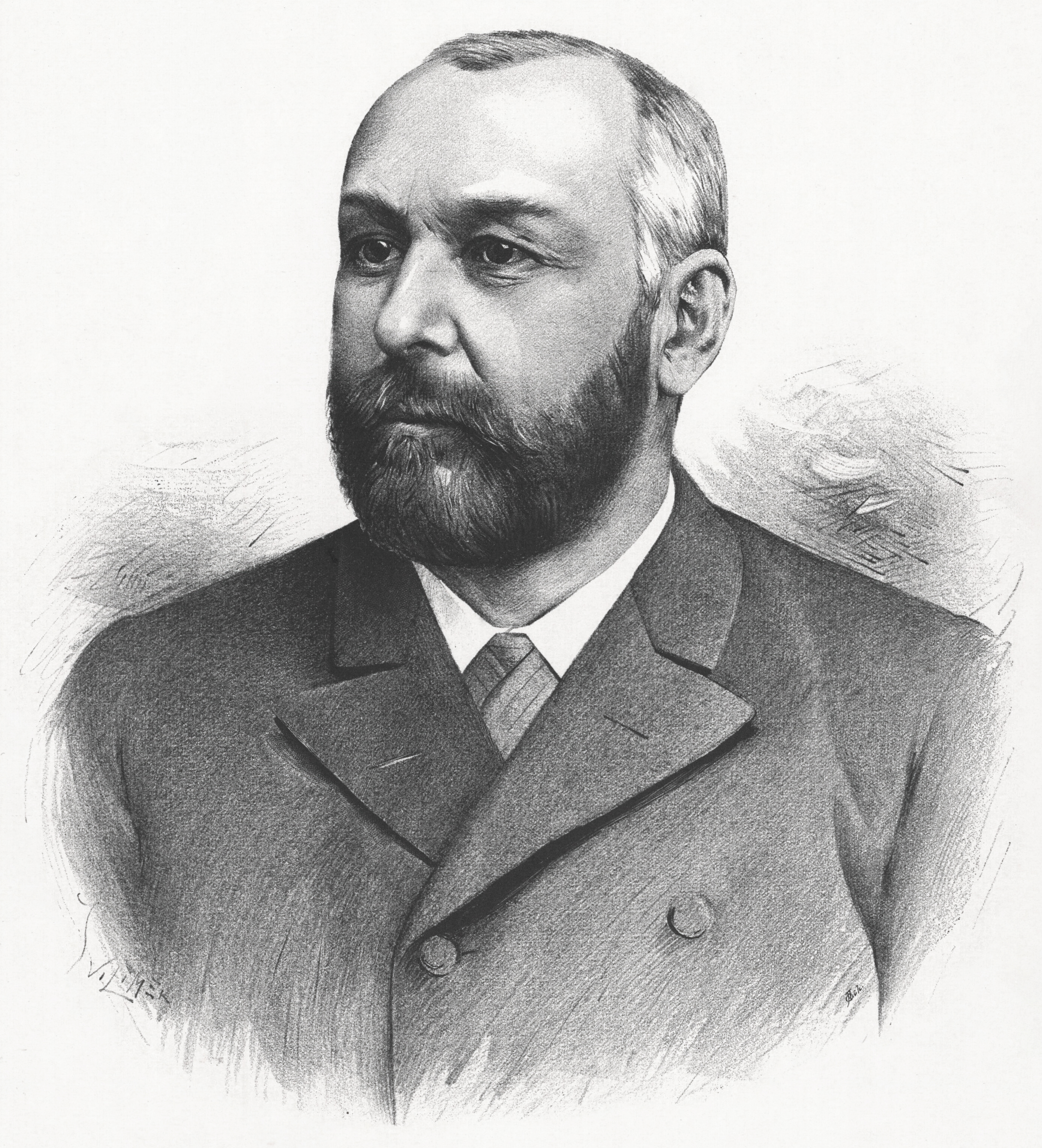
František Bartoš

František Bartoš (16 March 1837 – 11 June 1906) was a Czech ethnomusicologist, folklorist, folksong collector and dialectologist. He is viewed as the successor of František Sušil, the pioneer of Moravian ethnomusicology. He notably organized the collecting, categorizing and editing of hundreds of Moravian folksongs which were published is a four volume collection along with about 4,000 folksongs from other ethnic traditions. The folksongs appear in ethnographic monographs and the work as a whole is viewed as one of the most important folk song collections ever published. However, Bartoš, like many other early European folk music scholars, sometimes changed the texts of the folk songs, thereby reducing the documentary value of the work.

Born in Mladcová near Zlín, Bartoš was educated at the Gymnasium in Olomouc and at the University of Vienna. In 1864 he became a schoolteacher in Strážnice, later taking teaching positions in Olomouc, Těšín, and the first Czech Gymnasium in Brno (1869). In 1888 he became the director of the second Czech Gymnasium in Brno. His employment there brought him into a working relationship with Leoš Janáček, who helped him with his third volume of folk songs. Bartoš in turn furthered Janáček's interest and understanding of Czech and Moravian folksongs which influenced his musical compositions. Bartoš died in his native town in 1906.

== Sources ==
- Jiří Vysloužil. "Bartoš, František (i)", The New Grove Dictionary of Music and Musicians, 2001.
- Media related to František Bartoš at Wikimedia Commons
