= 2025 Brno-City by-election =

Election for Parliament of Czech Republic

2025 Czech senate by-election
17 - 18 January 2025
- Round 1 Precinct Results

A by-election for the Brno-City Senate seat in the Czech Republic was held on 17 and 18 January 2025 following the death of incumbent senator Roman Kraus.

== Background ==
Roman Kraus served as a senator of the Senate of the Parliament of the Czech Republic since 2020 as a member of the Civic Democratic Party (ODS). He died on 30 October 2024. His seat would be up for election in 2026. The by-election for the seat was due to be held no later than 90 days following his death. The date for the first round of the by-election was set for 17 and 18 January 2025.

ODS nominated Zdeněk Papoušek who was expected to receive support from TOP 09 and KDU-ČSL. ANO nominated Karin Podivinská.

== Candidates ==
- Milan Hamerský (KAN), Lawyer and political scientist
- Martin Hovorka (Přísaha), Former director of Brno Zoo
- Michal Janda (Svobodní), Real estate broker and business skills lecturer
- Petr Koš (SPD, Tricolour, PRO), Brno City Police Officer
- Zdeněk Papoušek (ODS, TOP 09, KDU-ČSL, STAN, Czech Pirate Party, Green Party, Fakt Brno), Former Senator for KDU-ČSL
- Karin Podivinská (ANO, SOCDEM), Deputy of Brno Mayor.
- Pavel Trčala (MZH), leader of Moravian Land Movement.

== Results ==
Candidate	Party	1st round	
Candidate	Party	votes	%
Zdeněk Papoušek	ODS, KDU-ČSL, TOP 09, STAN, Pirates, Greens, Fakt Brno	11 788	59,40
Karin Podivinská	ANO, SOCDEM	4 350	21,92
Petr Koš	SPD, Tricolour, PRO 2022	1 153	5,81
Pavel Trčala	MZH	1 150	5,79
Martin Hovorka,	Přísaha	871	4,38
Milan Hamerský	KAN (Note: Supported by LANO and Hlas.)	530	2,67
