= Liberal Reform Party (Czech Republic) =

- Founded: 2002
- Dissolved: 2010
- Ideology: Classical liberalism Liberalism

The Liberal Reform Party (Czech: Liberální reformní strana, LiRA) was a small free market classical liberal political party in the Czech Republic. It had one member of the Senate, Jiří Zlatuška, who was elected to his six-year term in 2002–2008.

== See also ==
- Liberalism in the Czech lands
