= Martin Špinar =

Czech footballer

Personal information
- Date of birth: 1 December 1972 (age 53)
- Place of birth: Brno, Czechoslovakia
- Position: Defender

Senior career*
Years	Team	Apps	(Gls)
1990–1996	FC Boby Brno		
1996–1997	FC Tatran Poštorná		
1997–1998	AFK Atlantic Lázně Bohdaneč		
1998–2000	Dukla Pribram		
- * Club domestic league appearances and goals

Martin Špinar (born 1 December 1972) is a retired Czech football defender.
