= Rudíkov =

- Municipality
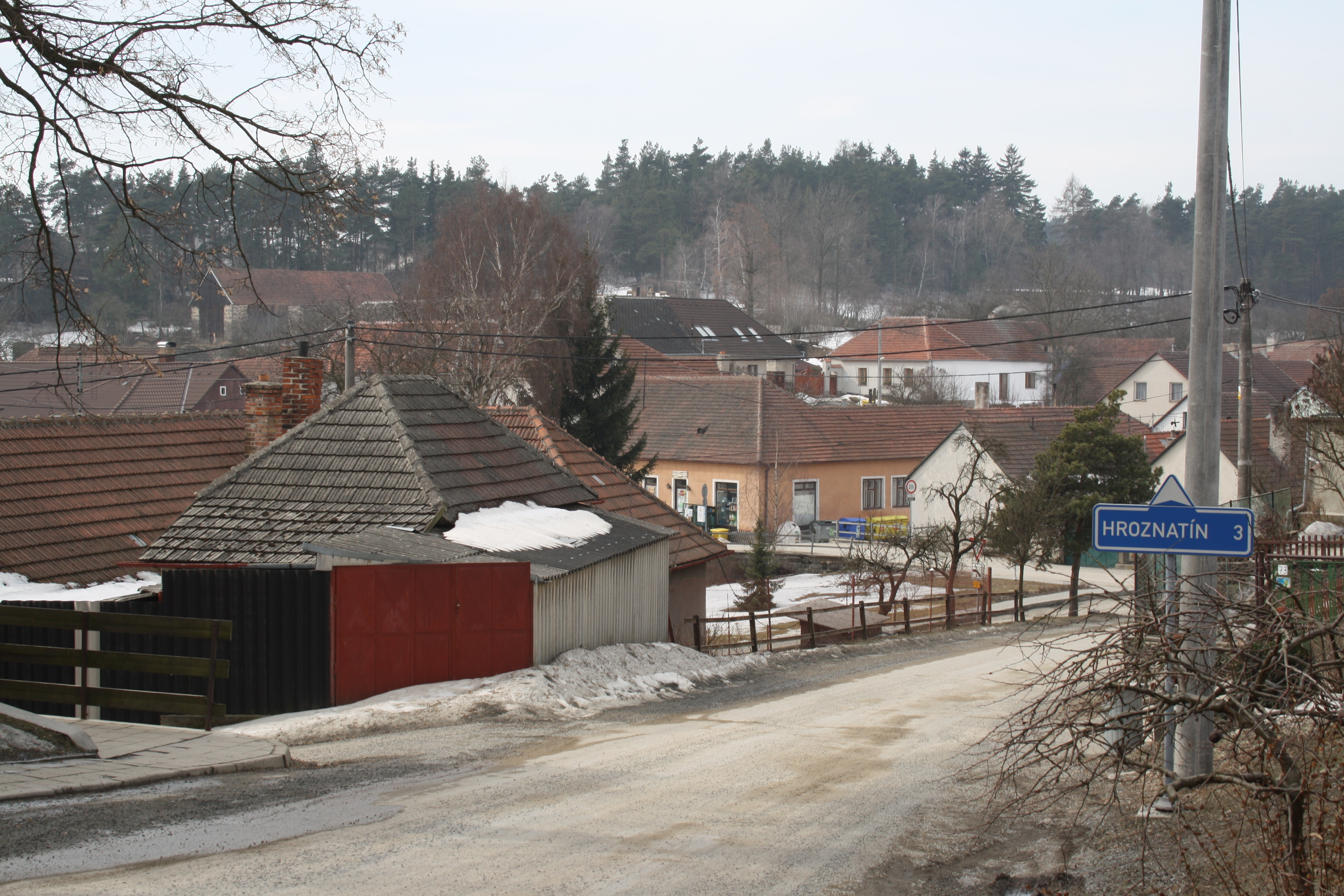
- Centre of Rudíkov

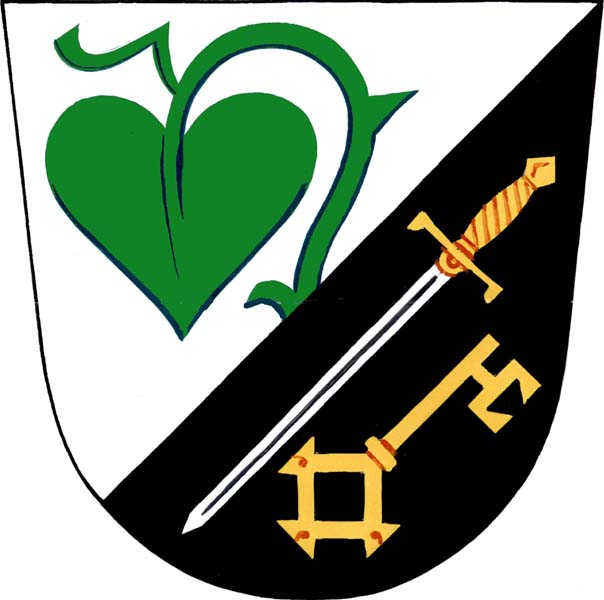
- Flag Coat of arms

- Location in the Czech Republic
- Coordinates: 49°17′17″N 15°56′45″E
- Country: Czech Republic
- Region: Vysočina
- District: Třebíč
- First mentioned: 1234

Area
  - Total: 7.07 km^{2} (2.73 sq mi)
- Elevation: 516 m (1,693 ft)

Population (2026-01-01)
  - Total: 774
  - Density: 109/km^{2} (284/sq mi)
- Time zone: UTC+1 (CET)
  - Summer (DST): UTC+2 (CEST)
- Postal code: 675 05
- Website: www.rudikov.cz

Rudíkov is a municipality and village in Třebíč District in the Vysočina Region of the Czech Republic. It has about 800 inhabitants.

Rudíkov lies approximately 9 kilometres (6 mi) north-east of Třebíč, 29 km (18 mi) south-east of Jihlava, and 142 km (88 mi) south-east of Prague.

== Demographics ==
Historical population
| Year | Pop. | ±% |
|---|---|---|
| 1869 | 364 | — |
| 1880 | 453 | +24.5% |
| 1890 | 505 | +11.5% |
| 1900 | 501 | −0.8% |
| 1910 | 531 | +6.0% |
| 1921 | 501 | −5.6% |
| 1930 | 501 | +0.0% |
| 1950 | 471 | −6.0% |
| 1961 | 535 | +13.6% |
| 1970 | 564 | +5.4% |
| 1980 | 630 | +11.7% |
| 1991 | 659 | +4.6% |
| 2001 | 691 | +4.9% |
| 2011 | 669 | −3.2% |
| 2021 | 665 | −0.6% |
Source: Censuses

== Notable people ==
- Vladimír Šťastný (1841–1910), priest and poet
