= 2019 ANO 2011 leadership election =

- 17 February 2019
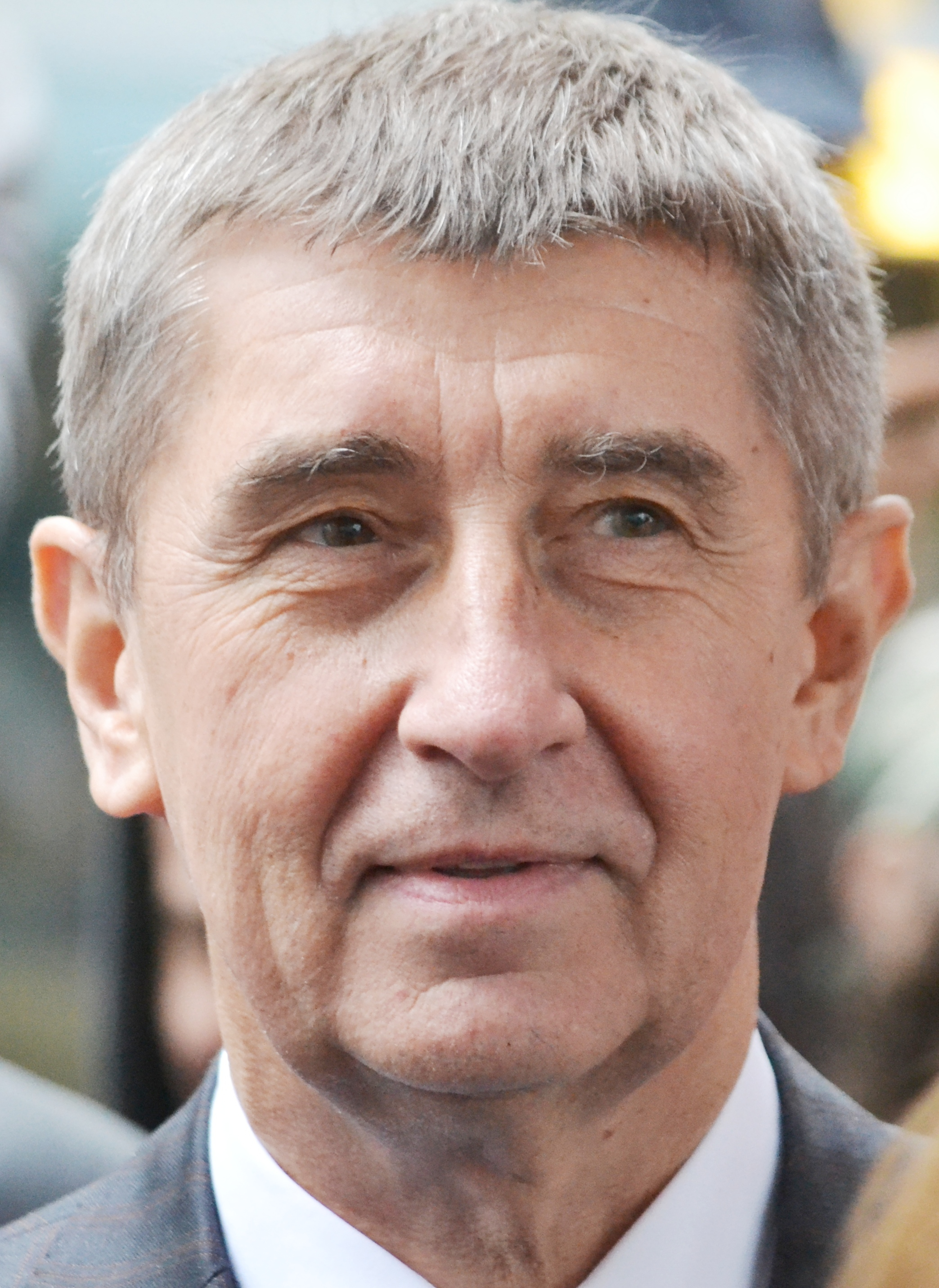
Candidate	Andrej Babiš
Electoral vote	206
Percentage	86.5%
leader of ANO 2011 before election
Andrej Babiš
Elected leader of ANO 2011
Andrej Babiš

A leadership election for ANO 2011 was held on 17 February 2019. Incumbent Andrej Babiš was the only candidate. He won another term when he received 206 votes of 238.

== Background ==
Andrej Babiš announced on 29 November 2018 that he will seek another term as the leader of ANO 2011. Babiš confirmed his candidacy on 2 January 2019.

Candidate	Votes
Andrej Babiš	206
Against	13
Invalid/blank votes	19
Total	238
