= 2016 Civic Democratic Party leadership election =

Czech political party leadership election

- 16 January 2016
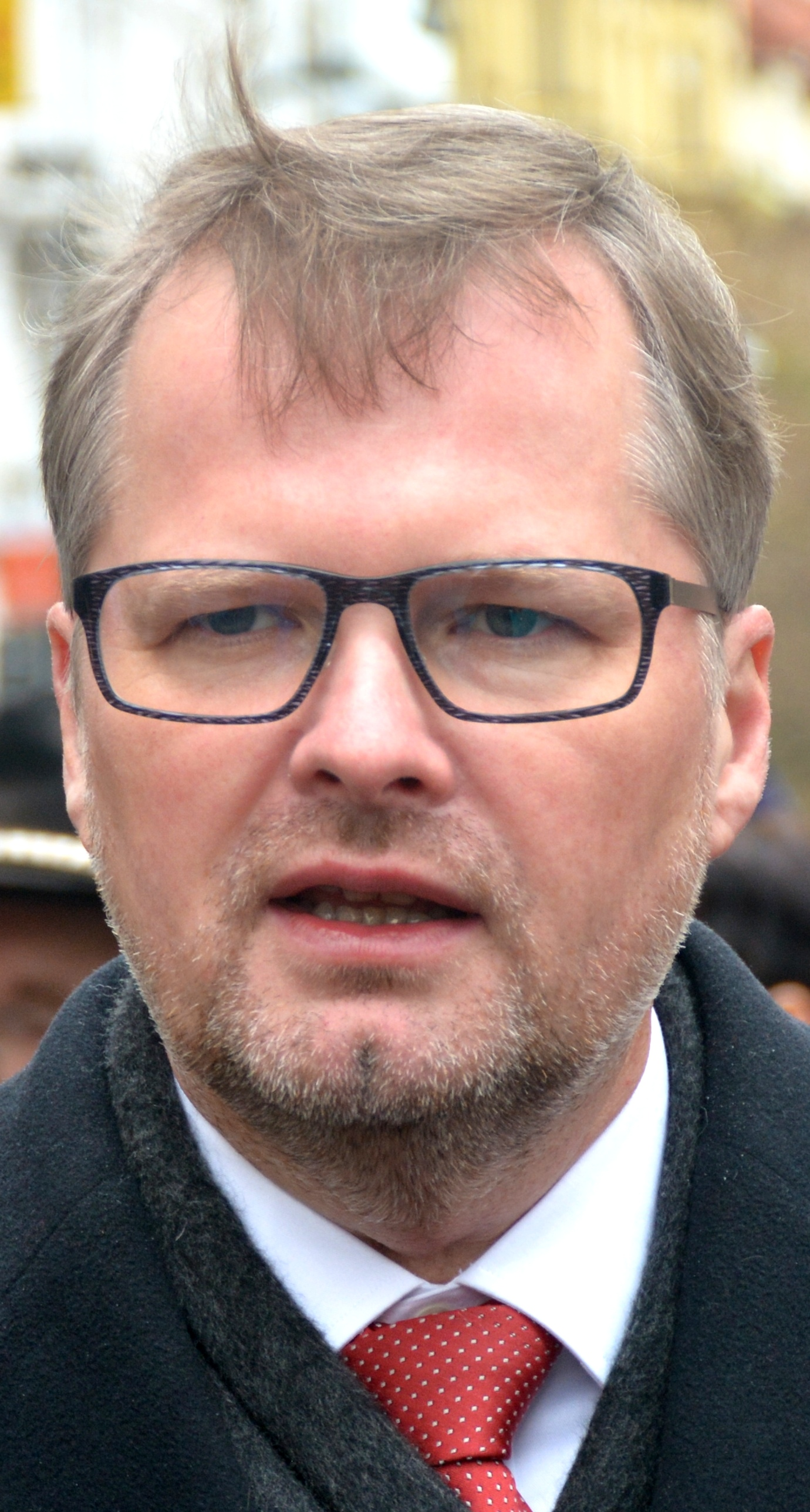
Candidate	Petr Fiala
Electoral vote	436
Percentage	92%
Leader of ODS before election
Petr Fiala
Elected Leader of ODS
Petr Fiala

The Civic Democratic Party (ODS) leadership election of 2016 was a part of party's congress. The incumbent leader Petr Fiala was unopposed. Fiala was re-elected when he received 93% of votes from delegates.

== Background ==
Petr Fiala is the leader of ODS since 2014 when he defeated Miroslava Němcová. In 2016, he received nomination from all 13 regional organisations and his reelection was considered certain. Fiala ran uncontested. Fiala's leadership was praised for saving the party because ODS suffered heavy losses in 2013 and there was a threat that party could lose its parliamentary seats in future. Fiala managed to stabilise party's support.

== Voting ==
Candidate	Vote	%
Petr Fiala	436	92%
Against	34	8%
