= 2020 Civic Democratic Party leadership election =

Czech political party election

- 18 January 2020
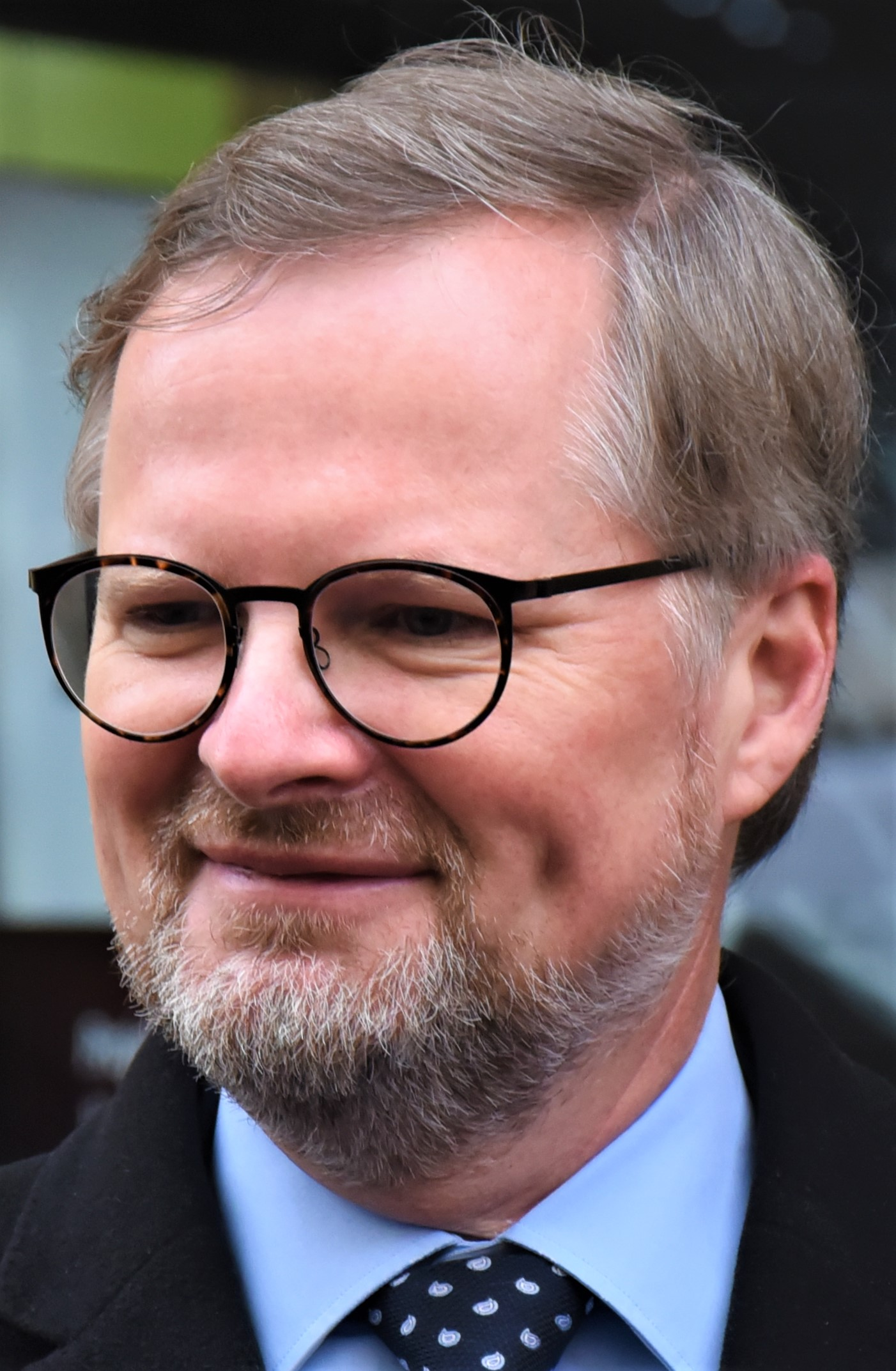
Candidate	Petr Fiala
Electoral vote	470
Percentage	90.56%
Leader of ODS before election
Petr Fiala
Elected Leader of ODS
Petr Fiala

The 2020 Civic Democratic Party (ODS) leadership election was held on 18 January 2020. The incumbent leader Petr Fiala was running for another term as the sole candidate. Fiala was reelected with 90% of the vote.

== Background ==
Petr Fiala has been the leader of the party since 2014. Leadership elections are held every 2 years.

Vysočina regional organisation held a meeting on 2 November 2019. It gave its nomination to Petr Fiala. Fiala was supported by almost all delegates.

Fiala then received nominations from other regional organisations, being the only candidate.

== Candidates ==
- Petr Fiala, the incumbent leader.

== Voting ==
Candidate	Vote	%
Petr Fiala	470	90.56%
Against	39	9.44%
