= Moravian Land Movement =

Moravian Land Movement Moravské zemské hnutí
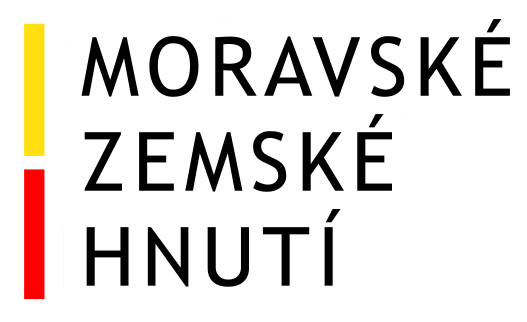
- Abbreviation: MZH
- Chairman: Pavel Trčala
- Vice Chairman: Vladan Ševčík
- Founded: 9 April 2018; 7 years ago
- Split from: Moravané
- Ideology: Moravian autonomy Regionalism; Direct democracy Pro-Europeanism
- Political position: Centre to centre-left
- European affiliation: European Free Alliance
- Colours: Moravian national colours: Yellow; Red
- Senate: 0 / 81
- Chamber of Deputies: 0 / 200
- European Parliament: 0 / 21
- Municipal councils: 34 / 62,300

Website
- moravskehnuti.cz

The Moravian Land Movement (Czech: Moravské zemské hnutí; MZH) is a political party in the Czech Republic that campaigns for the establishment of an autonomous region in Moravia and Czech Silesia. It was founded in 2018 as a breakaway from Moravané and claims to be the successor to the Movement for Autonomous Democracy–Party for Moravia and Silesia.

== Emergence of the movement ==
The movement was registered in April 2018, the constituent assembly took place in May of the same year. Within the European political parties, MZH is a member of the European Free Alliance, which was admitted to the General Assembly in Brussels on 8 March 2019. In the elections to the municipal councils in 2018, the movement won 14 seats. The basis of the membership base are former members of the Moravané party. At the time of its establishment, the Moravian Land Movement had about fifty members.

== Membership in the EFA ==
On 8 March 2019, when the Moravian Land Movement was accepted into the EFA, it became the only representative of the Czech Republic in the EFA. The EFA is part of the Greens/EFA faction, which has several seats in the European Parliament. Within the EFA, the Moravian Land Movement became part of the Central European Working Group. The Moravian Land Movement met there for the first time on 23 September 2019, when it addressed the issues of decentralization, self-government, education and regionalism. At the end of the meeting, a seminar on water retention in the landscape took place. The whole EFA Bureau took part in this inaugural meeting. Representatives of other regions were from Silesia, Vojvodina or Bavaria.

== Movement bodies ==
The most important matters are decided by the MZH Assembly, a meeting of the whole party. It meets 3 times a year.

Among the assemblies, the activities of the movement are decided by the highest body, the Council of the Movement, which currently has seven members. It consists of the chairman of the movement, the vice-chairman and 5 members of the council. All this is controlled by the Audit and Arbitration Commission.

== Objectives ==
Based on the preamble of the Constitution of the Czech Republic, which speaks about the citizens of the Czech Republic in Bohemia, Moravia and Silesia, the Moravian Land Movement seeks democratically to unite fourteen regions into Bohemia, Moravia and Silesia (and the metropolitan country Prague) and equip them with self-governing competencies advanced models of proven Länder. The movement considers strong territorial self-government and the modern conception of traditional regions, which naturally compete with growing centralism, to be one of the cornerstones and pillars of a democratic establishment. He considers the return to this value to be an important part of the effort to revive and strengthen democracy in our country, in dealing with the pressures of undemocratic forces.

== Election results ==
=== Chamber of Deputies ===
Date	Leader	Votes		Seats			Position
Date	Leader	No.	%	No.	±	Size	Position
2021	Ondřej Hýsek	1,648	0.03	0 / 200	0	20th	No seats
2025	Pavel Trčala	3,842	0.07	0 / 200	0	18th	No seats

=== Municipal ===
Komunální volby
Volby	Počet hlasů	%	Mandátů	Poznámky
2014	–	-	17	
2018	84 873	0,08	14	

=== Senate ===
Volby do Senátu Parlamentu České republiky
Volby	Volební obvod	Kandidát	Počet hlasů	%	Mandátů	Poznámky
2018	59 – Brno-město	Pavel Trčala	960	3,26	0	
2018	62 – Prostějov	Pavel Makový	1 681	3,97	0	

=== European Parliament ===
Volby do Evropského parlamentu
Volby	Počet hlasů	%	Mandátů	Poznámky
2019	3195	0,13	0	

The Moravian Land Movement fared best in the district of the Rousínov take-over site, where it gained 2.19%. Of the districts, the best result was in Znojmo, where it gained 1.38%, and of the regions, it achieved the best result in the South Moravian Region, where it had 0.52%.

==== Electoral gain in the EP elections in Moravia ====
Volby do Evropského parlamentu
Volby	Počet hlasů	%	Poznámky
2019	2694	0,31	

=== Regional ===
The regional elections were decided by the 5th Assembly held in Dačice. The preparation of regional elections was entrusted to the Council of the Ministry of Health, which has the task of compiling candidate lists and negotiating with central political entities in the South Moravian Region on a possible electoral coalition. The Moravian Land Movement joined the Coalition for Moravia, which also consists of TOP 09, the Greens, the Idealists and the Liberal-Environmental Party, and which succeeded in the elections to the South Moravian Regional Council. MZH member Jiří Kacetl was elected to the Committee for Interregional Relations of the South Moravian Regional Council.

== Local organizations ==
The establishment of local organizations was approved at the 5th MZH Assembly. These are, for example, local organizations in Dačice (originally it was an organization of the Moravané party), MZH Královo pole, MZH Brno-sever nebo MZH Brno východ.

== Program goals ==
- reform of the EU as an association of historic countries and natural regions
- reform of the Czech Republic as a state composed of four countries: Bohemia, Moravia, Silesia and the Metropolitan Country of Prague
- creation of the self-governing Moravian Land headed by the Land Assembly, the Land Government and the Land President (similar bodies functioned until 1949)
- strengthening municipal self-government

=== Members of the MZH Council ===
- Chairman of the movement – Ondřej Hýsek, representative of the Královo Pole district, deputy director of the Akademia grammar school
- Vice-chairman of the movement – Vladan Ševčík, engineer, power engineer
- Member of the MZH Council – Bohuslav Klíma, archaeologist
- Member of the MZH Council – Jaroslav Kupka
- Member of the MZH Council – Lada Bastlová, social worker
- Member of the MZH Council – Pavel Trčala, entrepreneur
- Member of the MZH Council – Jiří Kolářský
- Member of the MZH Revision Commission – Jiří Kacetl, representative of the city of Znojmo, historian
- Member of the MZH Revision Commission – Jiří Albrecht, painter, writer
- Member of the MZH Revision Commission – Bohumil Šuhaj

=== External links ===
- Movement website
