= Petr Fiala =

Prime Minister of the Czech Republic from 2021 to 2025

Petr Fiala MP
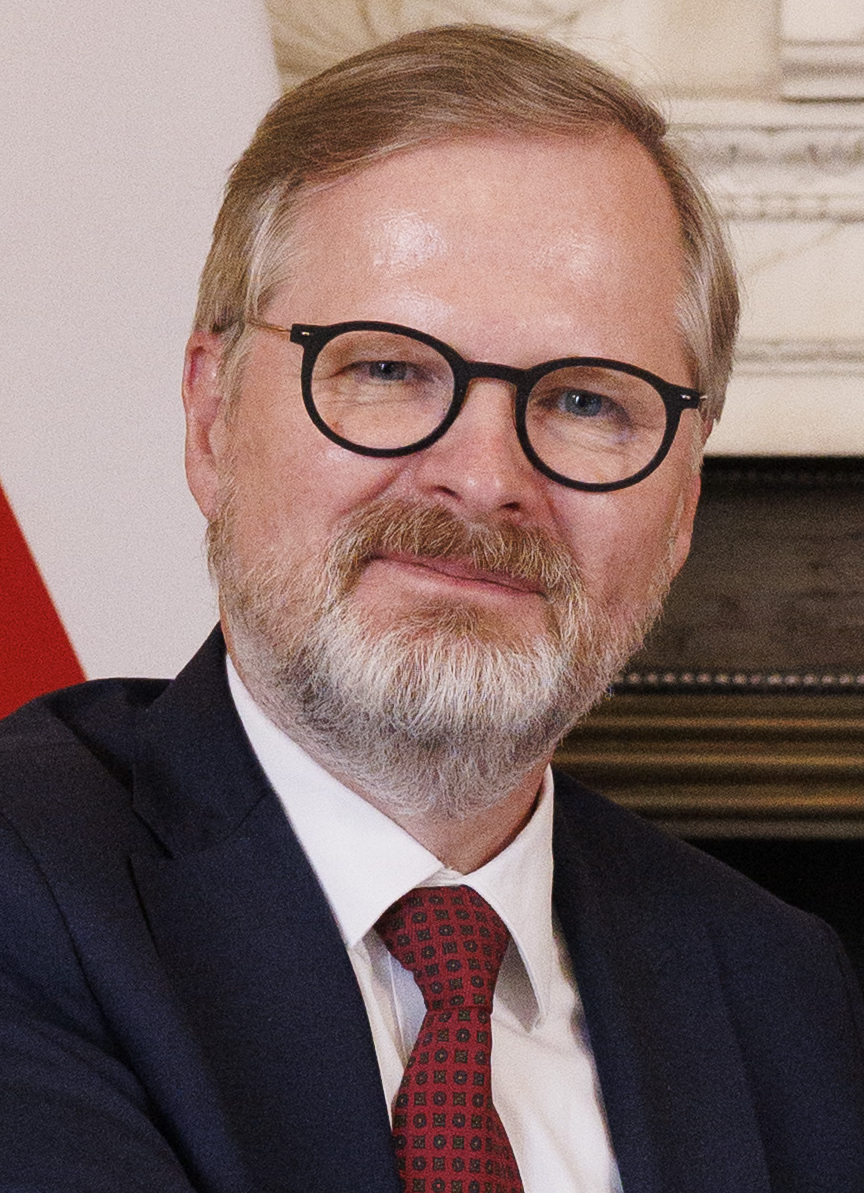
- Fiala in 2025

Prime Minister of the Czech Republic
- In office 28 November 2021 – 15 December 2025
- President: Miloš Zeman; Petr Pavel
- Deputy: See list: Vít Rakušan; Marian Jurečka; Vlastimil Válek; Ivan Bartoš (2021–24)
- Preceded by: Andrej Babiš
- Succeeded by: Andrej Babiš

Leader of the Civic Democratic Party
- In office 18 January 2014 – 17 January 2026
- Preceded by: Petr Nečas
- Succeeded by: Martin Kupka

Minister of Education, Youth and Sports
- In office 2 May 2012 – 10 July 2013
- Prime Minister: Petr Nečas
- Preceded by: Josef Dobeš
- Succeeded by: Dalibor Štys

Member of the Chamber of Deputies
- Incumbent
- Assumed office 26 October 2013
- Constituency: South Moravian Region

Personal details
- Born: 1 September 1964 (age 62) Brno, Czechoslovakia
- Party: ODS (since 2013)
- Other political affiliations: Spolu (since 2020)
- Spouse: Jana Fialová (m. 1992)
- Children: 3
- Education: Masaryk University; Charles University in Prague
- Website: pfiala.cz

Petr Fiala ([ˈpɛtr̩ ˈfɪjala]; born 1 September 1964) is a Czech politician and political scientist who served as the prime minister of the Czech Republic from 2021 to 2025 and leader of the Civic Democratic Party (ODS) from 2014 to 2026. He previously served as the Minister of Education, Youth and Sports from 2012 to 2013. Prior to entering politics, he was the rector of Masaryk University.

Fiala was first elected to the Chamber of Deputies as a non-partisan in the 2013 election. He won the 2014 Civic Democratic Party leadership election, promising to reform the party and regain public trust after a corruption scandal involving Prime Minister Petr Nečas. Fiala's party finished a distant second place in the 2017 parliamentary election, and remained in opposition despite multiple offers from the incoming Prime Minister Andrej Babiš to participate in his governing coalition.

In 2020, Fiala led the initiative for a centre-right electoral alliance with KDU-ČSL and TOP 09, known as Spolu. He became its candidate for the premiership in the 2021 Czech parliamentary election, running on a pro-Western and pro-European centre-right platform, focused on fiscal responsibility and closer relations with NATO as part of Atlanticism. The alliance outperformed initial opinion polls and received the highest number of votes in the election, though with one seat fewer in the Chamber of Deputies than second-placed ANO 2011.

Under Fiala's leadership, Spolu formed a coalition agreement with the Pirates and Mayors alliance, with a majority of 108 of 200 seats. He was appointed prime minister by President Miloš Zeman on 28 November 2021 and Petr Fiala's Cabinet took power on 17 December, making him the third oldest person to hold the office, as well as the first with a political science background and the first from Brno.

Fiala came into office promising to reform and stabilize the government's growing national debt; however, the early months of his premiership saw the Russian invasion of Ukraine, the provision of aid to Ukraine, and the opening of the Czech Republic's borders to the highest number of Ukrainian refugees per capita in the ensuing Ukrainian refugee crisis. Fiala imposed sanctions on Russia and pushed to block Russian citizens from travelling to the European Union. He expressed strong support for Israel during the Gaza war. In 2022, the Czech Republic held the presidency of the Council of the European Union. Fiala's administration also faced rising inflation and resulting decline of real wages, wider concerns about the economy and the ongoing global energy crisis. Throughout his term, Fiala's government has seen approval ratings in the low 20s. He led the Spolu alliance into the 2025 election in which his governing coalition lost its majority. He was succeeded by his predecessor, Andrej Babiš, on 15 December.

== Family background ==
Fiala comes from a Moravian middle-class family. His paternal grandfather, František Fiala, was a lawyer who served as a senior councillor in the political administration of district governorates in Ostrava, Hodonín, and Olomouc during the First Czechoslovak Republic, and later as a state councillor in Brno.

His paternal grandmother, Františka Fialová, was Jewish. During World War II, a significant number of his relatives were deported to German concentration camps due to their Jewish heritage. Fiala has often cited his family's experience with both Nazi and Communist totalitarianism as a fundamental influence on his political views and his commitment to democracy.

== Early life ==
Petr Fiala was born in Brno to a conservative Catholic family. His father, who was partly of Jewish origin, was a Holocaust survivor. Fiala studied history and Czech language at the Faculty of Literature of Masaryk University between 1983 and 1988, and after graduating he worked as a historian in a local museum in Kroměříž.

In 1996, he became a docent at Charles University in Prague, and in 2002 he was named as the first professor of political science in the Czech Republic. In 2004, he became dean of the Faculty of Social Studies at Masaryk University, and in the same year was elected as rector of the university, defeating Jan Wechsler in the third round. Fiala was reelected in 2008 and remained in the position until 2011. While Fiala was rector, Masaryk University increased its enrollment to around 45,000 students, became the most popular Czech university in terms of applications, and created a nationwide system for detecting academic plagiarism. During this period, Masaryk University built a new €220 million campus for biomedicine, opened a research station in Antarctica, and established the Central European Institute of Technology (CEITEC) using CZK 5.3 billion from the European Structural and Investment Funds. CEITEC launched in 2011.

== Career ==
=== Public activism ===
In the 1980s, Fiala was involved in independent civic activism. Between 1984 and 1989, he participated in the so-called underground university, hosting seminars in Brno focused on political philosophy. He was involved in unofficial Christian activities, especially in the circle of secretly consecrated Bishop Stanislav Krátký. Along with other Brno students, he founded the samizdat university magazine Revue 88, published in 1988–1989.

After November 1989, Fiala continued his publishing and civic activism, working as an editor for magazines such as Proglas, Revue Politika, and Kontexty. In 1993, he founded the Centre for the Study of Democracy and Culture (CDK), a civic think-tank. Fiala was criticized for his activities during the 2021 election campaign because the centre was accepting state subsidies.

Fiala has been active for a long time in institutions and bodies related to higher education and research in the Czech Republic and abroad. He served as vice-chair of the Czech Rectors' Conference from 2005 until 2009, and chair between 2009 and 2011. Fiala was a member of the council of the European University Association between 2009 and 2011. In 2007, he was elected by the Chamber of Deputies to the council of the Institute for the Study of Totalitarian Regimes, where he served for five years. He is a member of many scientific and academic councils of public and private universities and research institutions in the Czech Republic and abroad. He has received a number of awards for his scientific and academic work; in 2011 he was awarded the Golden Plaque of the President of the Republic.

In 2005, he was part of the commission in the competition of Czech and Moravian wines, TOP 77.

=== Politics ===
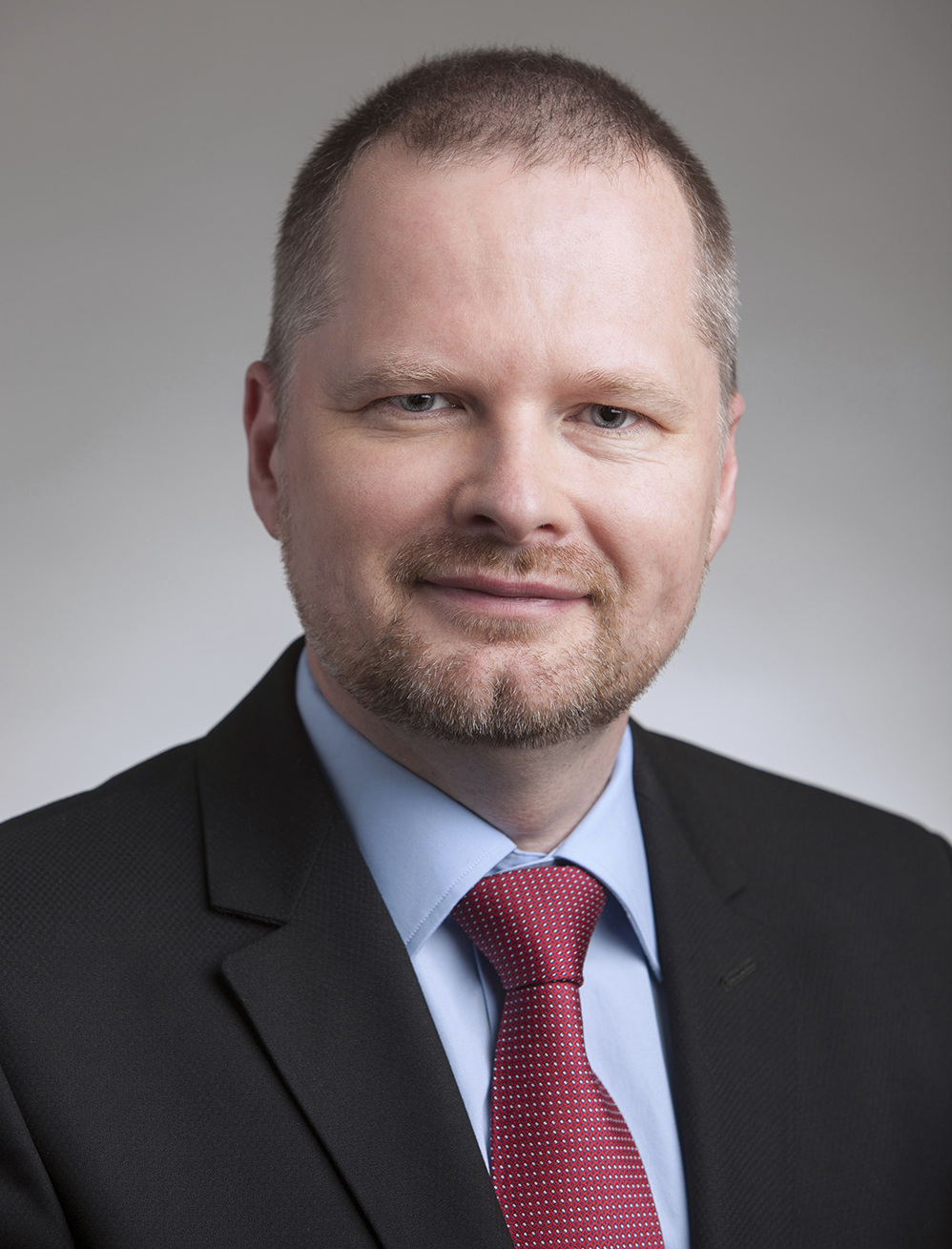
Fiala's official portrait as the Minister of Education, Youth and Sports in the government of Petr Nečas, April 2013.

In September 2011, Fiala served as chief aide for science to Prime Minister Petr Nečas, and was appointed as Minister of Education, Youth and Sports in Nečas' government on 2 May 2012, remaining in that post until Nečas resigned in 2013.

In the 2013 parliamentary election, Fiala was elected as an independent to the Chamber of Deputies. The Civic Democratic Party (ODS) was defeated in the election and Fiala joined the party in November 2013. In 2014, Fiala announced his candidacy for the leadership of ODS, and was elected as the party's fourth leader on 18 January. He was re-elected as party leader in 2016.

Fiala led ODS into the 2017 parliamentary election, in which the party finished second with 11% of the vote. He refused to negotiate with ANO 2011 about joining the subsequent government, and ODS remained in opposition. On 28 November 2017, Fiala was elected Deputy President of the Chamber of Deputies, receiving 116 of 183 votes. Fiala was reelected leader of ODS in 2018.

With Fiala as leader, ODS made gains in the 2018 municipal elections and won the Senate election of the same year. Fiala was reelected leader of ODS in 2020.

ODS also made gains during the 2020 regional elections. Fiala then started negotiating with KDU-ČSL and TOP 09 about forming an electoral alliance for the parliamentary election in 2021. ODS, KDU-ČSL and TOP 09 reached an agreement to form an alliance called Spolu ("Together"). Fiala became the alliance's candidate for the post of Prime Minister.

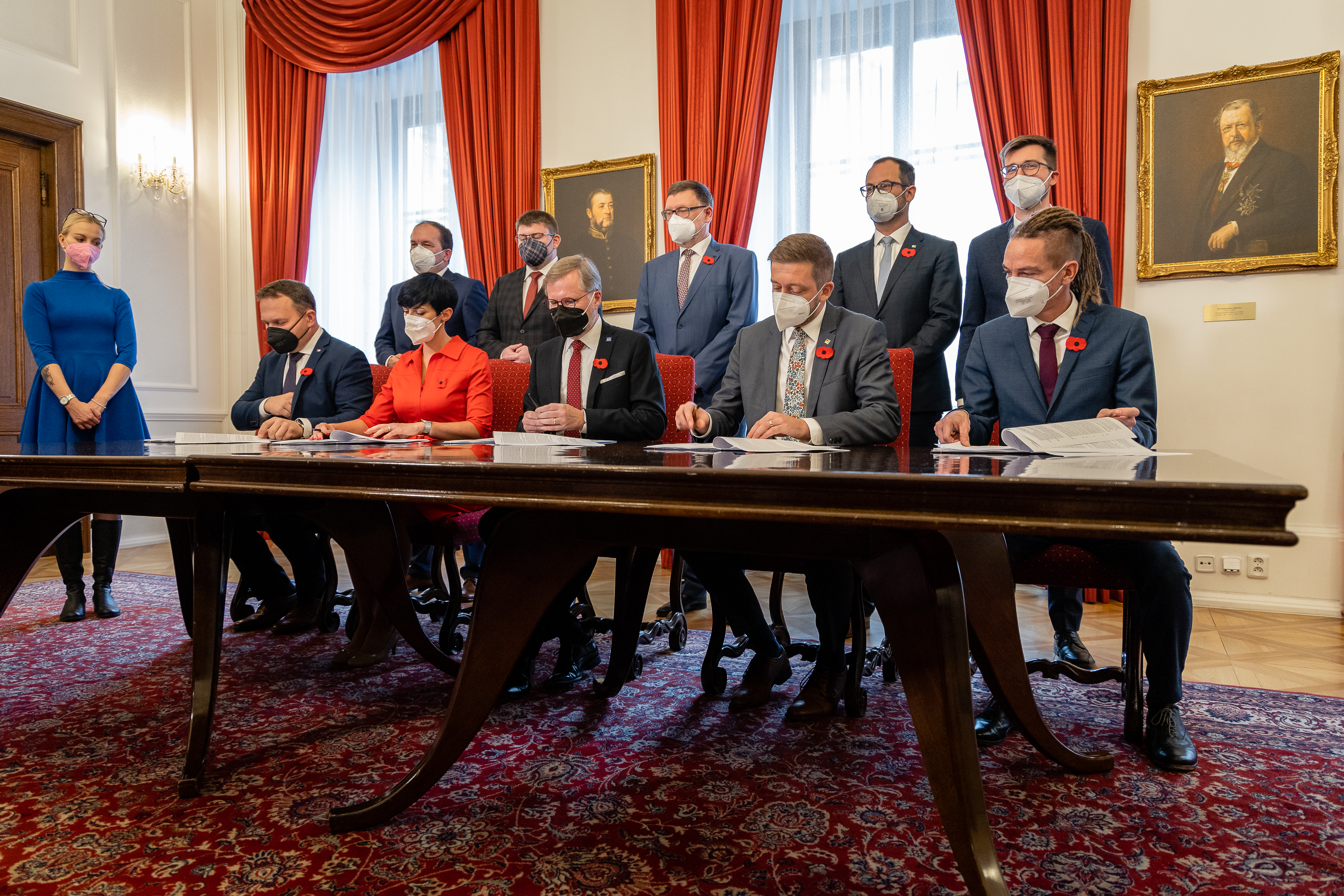
Petr Fiala and his coalition partners sign the coalition agreement for his cabinet at the Chamber of Deputies, 8 November 2021.

Ahead of the election, opinion polls suggested that ANO 2011 would win, but in an electoral upset Spolu won the highest number of votes, and opposition parties won a majority of seats in the Chamber of Deputies. The opposition parties signed a memorandum agreeing to nominate Fiala for the position of prime minister. On 8 November, five Czech parties, ranging from the liberal-conservative Civic Democrats to the centre-left liberal Pirate Party, signed a pact to form a new centre-right coalition government and pledged to cut budget deficits. On 9 November, President Miloš Zeman formally asked Fiala to form a new government. On 17 November 2021, Fiala introduced Zeman to his proposed cabinet and Zeman agreed to appoint Fiala the new prime minister the same year on 26 November. In November 2021, Fiala confirmed that he would like to continue with the Spolu coalition into the 2022 Senate and municipal elections.

=== Premiership ===
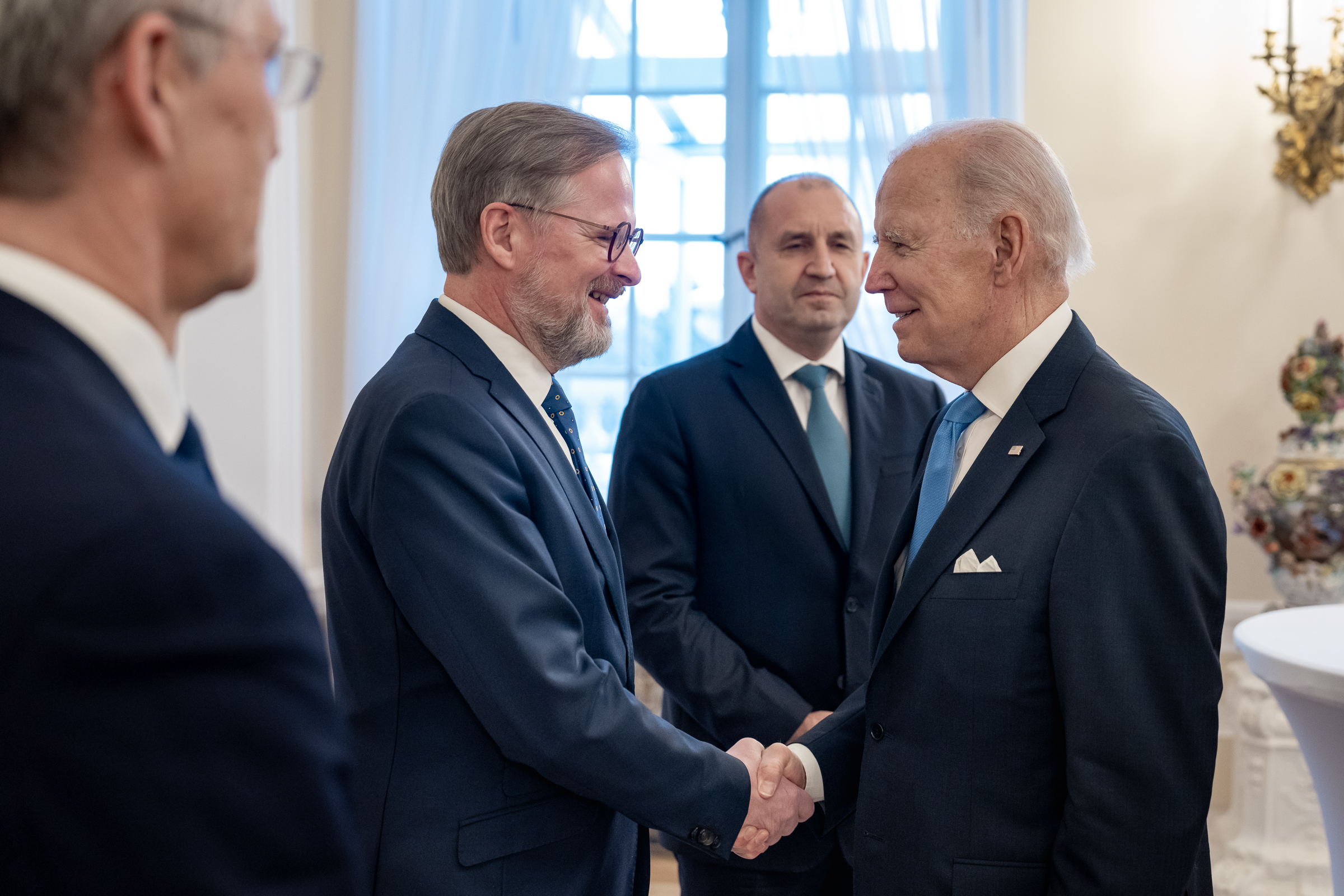
Fiala with U.S. President Joe Biden and NATO Secretary-General Jens Stoltenberg, 22 February 2023

On 28 November 2021, President Miloš Zeman appointed Petr Fiala as the 13th Prime Minister of the Czech Republic. Following his appointment, Fiala said he believed his government would bring change and improve the lives of people in the Czech Republic, but that the next year would be difficult for many citizens and the Czech Republic itself. His appointment took effect upon his Cabinet being sworn in, on 17 December 2021. Fiala's government won a confidence vote in the Chamber of Deputies of the Czech Republic on 13 January 2022 by 106–86.

Following the Russian invasion of Ukraine in February 2022, Petr Fiala and his government took a tough stance on Russia, pushing for the toughest sanctions against Russia and supporting Ukraine's accession to the European Union. After the invasion, the Czech Republic immediately began supplying weapons and humanitarian aid to Ukraine. On 15 March 2022, Fiala, together with Polish Prime Minister Mateusz Morawiecki and Slovenian Prime Minister Janez Janša, visited Kyiv to meet with Ukrainian President Volodymyr Zelenskyy in a display of support for Ukraine. The train journey, described by the media as a "risky mission", as well as an "extraordinary attempt to demonstrate support", was the first visit by foreign leaders to Kyiv since the start of the Russian invasion, and was hailed by President Zelenskyy as a "great, brave, correct and sincere step" after the meeting.

In July 2022, he officially accepted the Presidency of the Council of the European Union on behalf of the Czech Republic. He delivered a speech on the floor of the European Parliament, in which he called for the defense of European values, continuing support for Ukraine, and the inclusion of nuclear energy as a renewable resource (which was subsequently approved by a vote from MEPs). The First Vice-President of the European Commission, Frans Timmermans, said that the Presidency of the Council under Fiala had "achieved historic results", though Fiala was criticized by MEP and former Belgian Prime Minister Guy Verhofstadt for his opposition to abolishing the veto and the unanimity principle in European Council negotiations. On 6 October 2022, Fiala chaired the 1st European Political Community Summit in Prague.

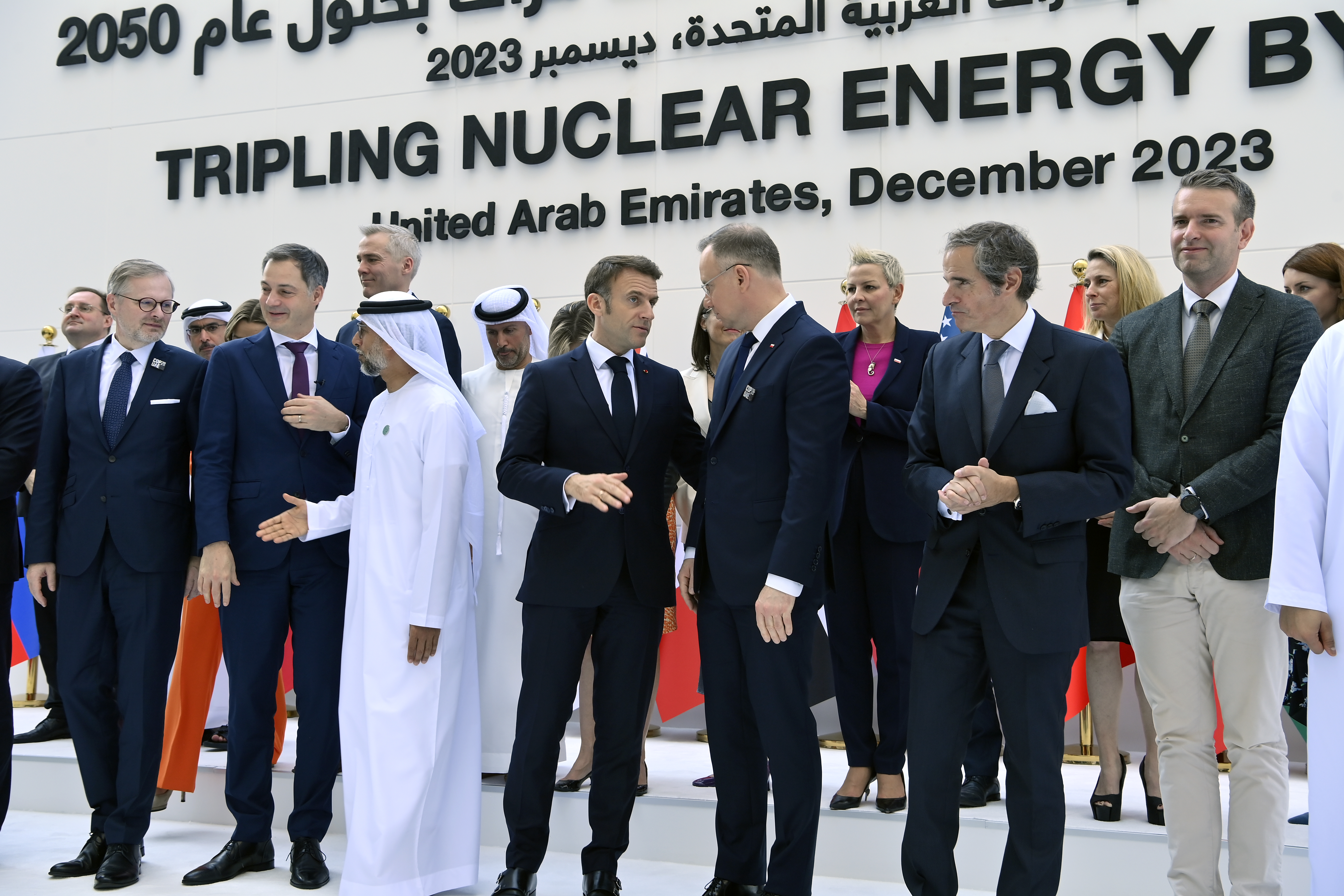
Fiala and French President Emmanuel Macron at COP28 in Dubai, United Arab Emirates, 2 December 2023

Starting from 2023, the Czech Republic went into recession, and subsequently continued to underperform economically relative to other European Union member states, which were showing signs of recovery from the COVID-19 pandemic. The Czech Republic also experienced high debt growth and a decrease in real wages.

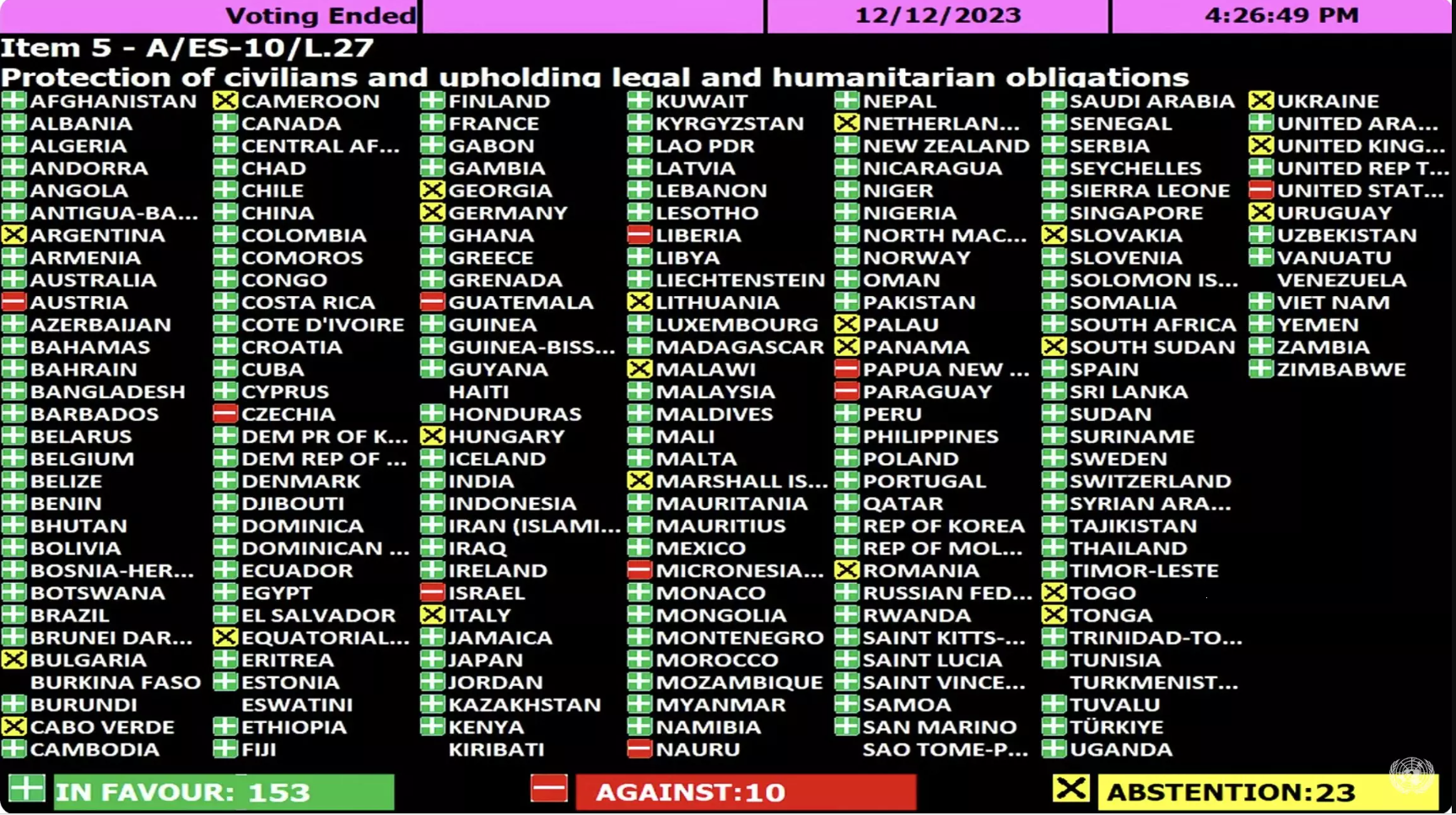
10 countries, including the Czech Republic and Israel, opposed the resolution calling for a ceasefire in Gaza that was overwhelmingly passed by the UN General Assembly on 12 December 2023

In October 2023, Fiala condemned the October 7 attacks, and expressed his support for Israel's right to self-defence and actions during the subsequent Gaza war. He said that Israel was "the only functioning democracy in the Middle East and is the key to stability in the region." On 25 October 2023, Fiala visited Israel to express solidarity with the country. Nigeria cancelled a planned visit by Fiala on 8 November 2023.

Fiala described the Czech Republic as "Israel's voice in Europe" and systematically opposed UN and European Union resolutions that criticized Israel's actions or sought sanctions against Israel. Czech arms exports to Israel doubled between 2022 and 2024 under the government of Petr Fiala.

During 2023, Fiala and his government encountered deeply negative ratings from the Czech public. In December 2023, Fiala's approval rating dropped to 16% in some polls, one of the lowest approval ratings among world leaders, and the lowest for a Czech Prime Minister since Petr Nečas.

On 26 February 2024, Fiala attended an emergency summit in Paris hosted by Emmanuel Macron, to discuss the military situation in Ukraine, as they had recently suffered the loss of Avdiivka. Fiala proposed the purchase of 500,000 rounds of artillery ammunition for Ukrainian forces from foreign sources. The Czech Republic were raising the proposal for the second time in one month, after the first proposal had been vetoed by France in the European Council. Whilst in Paris, Mark Rutte announced that the Dutch government would provide €100 million for this purpose, and Belgian Prime Minister Alexander De Croo announced that his government would provide €200 million, among 15 nations which announced support for the proposal.

In June 2025, Fiala supported US strikes on Iranian nuclear sites, saying, "Iran's nuclear program seriously threatens international security, and Saturday's US strike on three Iranian nuclear facilities is thus an understandable effort to prevent the development of nuclear weapons".

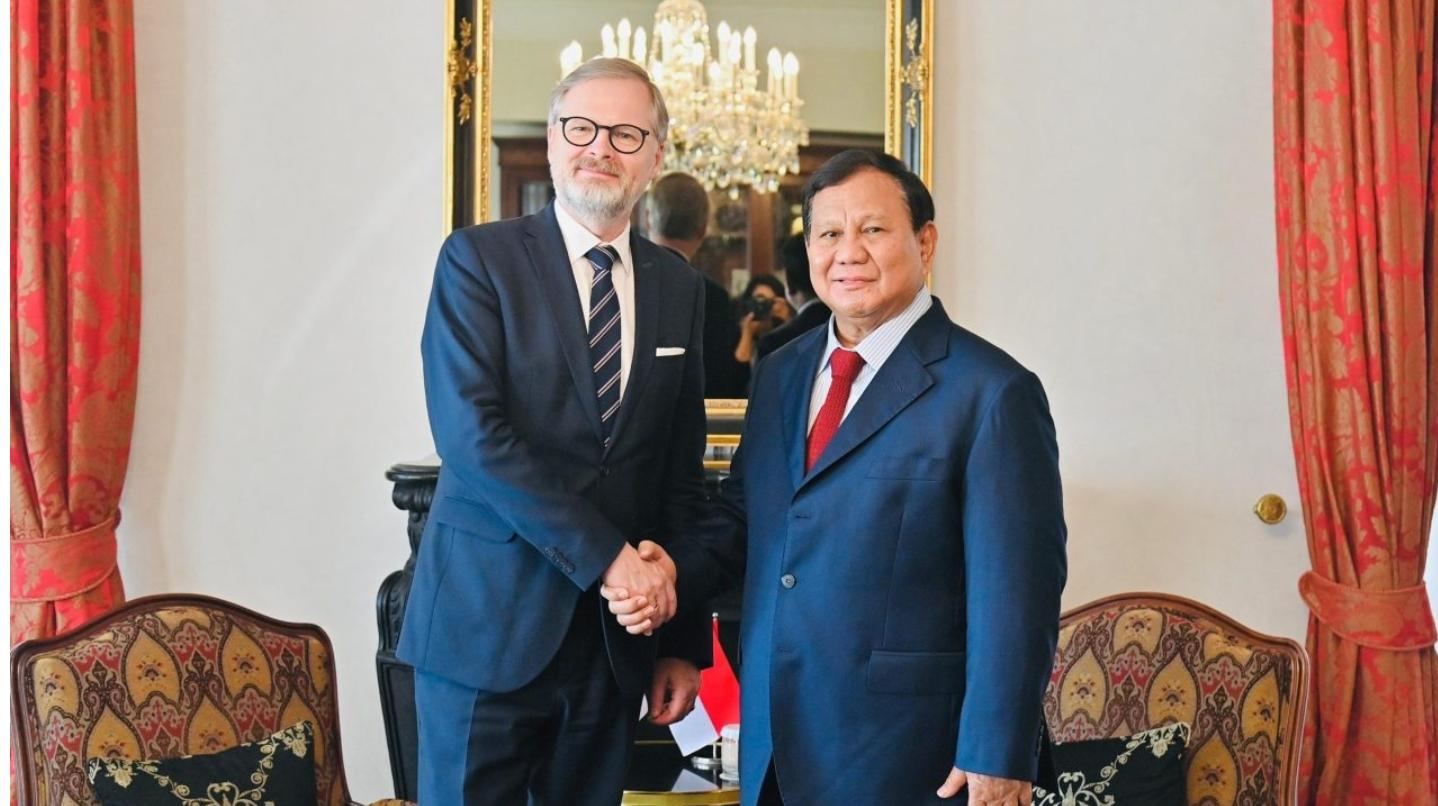
Fiala with Indonesian President Prabowo Subianto in Prague, 17 June 2025

Throughout his term as Prime Minister, Fiala has been working for eight hours a week at Masaryk University. Former Prime Minister Jan Fischer and others questioned Fiala's arrangement, with Fischer saying: "I cannot imagine that someone, in addition to his work as Prime Minister, regularly, not just on special occasions, lectures at a university. Learning requires preparation and concentration".

The austerity policies of Fiala's government led to rising inflation, stagnant wages, and fueled the housing crisis, contributing to public discontent.

Fiala led SPOLU into the 2025 parliamentary election, in which the coalition finished second with 23% of the vote. On 7 October 2025, Fiala announced that he would not seek reelection as leader of ODS.

=== Post-premiership ===
In December 2025, Fiala announced that he was considering running for president following recommendations from fellow party members. Journalist Martin Zveřina argued that Fiala could not win in a presidential election because voters would still remember his government's mistakes and broken promises. Commentators Anna Shavit, Luděk Staněk, and Jan Kalvoda described Fiala's intention as a "really stupid idea", and suggested that Fiala had too much free time. Fiala subsequently announced, in January 2026, that he did not intend to run, saying that Petr Pavel performed the function well.

There was also speculation, based on anonymous tips from an ODS Senator, that Fiala intended to run in the 2026 Czech Senate elections, where, if elected, he would replace Miloš Vystrčil as the president of the Senate. It was speculated that he would run either in District 60 - Brno-City or in District 27 - Prague 1, where he would replace Miroslava Němcová, who had already announced that she would not be standing for re-election. In February 2026, Fiala announced that he would not be running in the senate elections, and would instead establish a new think-tank called Political Platform (Czech: Politické fórum).

== Political views ==
A conservative, he holds soft Eurosceptic views, and says that he opposes "political extremism" and "populism". He opposes same-sex marriage as he stated in his book. Numerous Czech-based firms have called on Fiala to approve LGBT marriage. Fiala is a staunch supporter of Israel.

In August 2016, Fiala stated that "radical Islam is at war with Europe" and that the European Union should not accept migrants who pose a risk. He opposed the withdrawal of Czech soldiers from the war in Afghanistan. Fiala expressed opposition to Russian and Chinese involvement in the construction of the new unit of the Dukovany Nuclear Power Plant. He also claimed that human impact on climate change is "not entirely clear", which was met with criticism and accusations of populism from environmental experts.

At the beginning of June 2020, a statue in Prague of the British Prime Minister Winston Churchill, in Winston Churchill Square in Žižkov, was spray-painted with the inscription "He was a racist. Black Lives Matter", referring to a wave of protests against police brutality and racism triggered by the murder of George Floyd in the United States. Fiala condemned the vandalism of Churchill's statue, describing Churchill as "the great democratic politician ... who contributed to the defeat of Adolf Hitler", and criticised the graffiti as "stupid and shameful."

Prior to the 2021 election, Fiala criticised the European Green Deal, a political initiative of the European Commission to promote the transition to a green economy. However, he wrote in May 2021: "The Green Deal is reality. There is no point in speculating how it could be otherwise. Now we must seize the opportunity to modernize the Czech economy and improve the quality of life by investing in sustainable development, renewable resources and the circular economy."

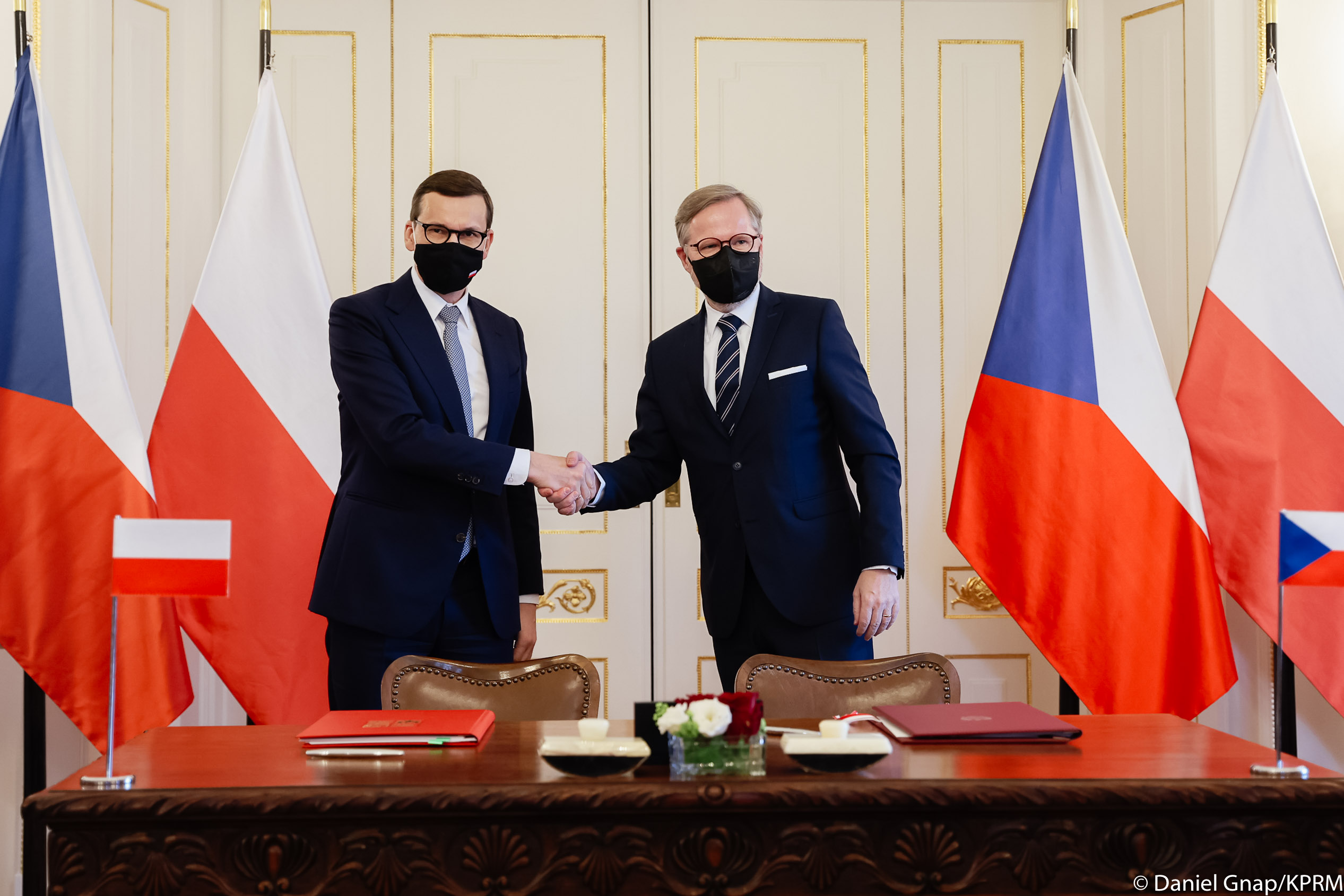
Petr Fiala with Polish Prime Minister Mateusz Morawiecki in Prague, 3 February 2022

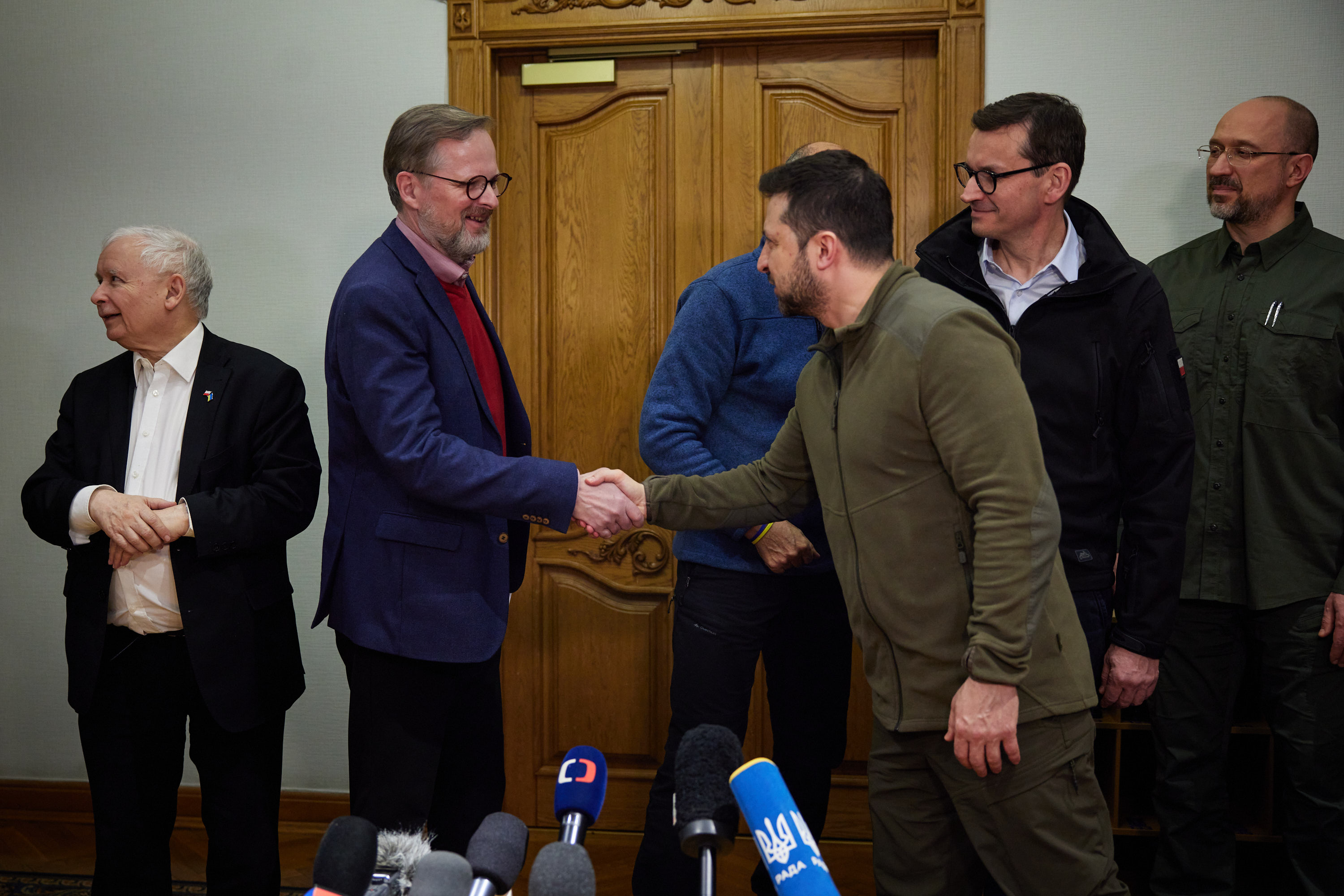
Petr Fiala with Ukrainian President Volodymyr Zelenskyy in Kyiv, 15 March 2022

Fiala also serves as the chairman of the board of directors of the independent liberal-conservative think tank Pravý břeh.

Fiala owns a CZ 75 pistol, which he is authorized to carry for personal protection. He has been a gun owner long before entering politics.

=== Foreign issues ===
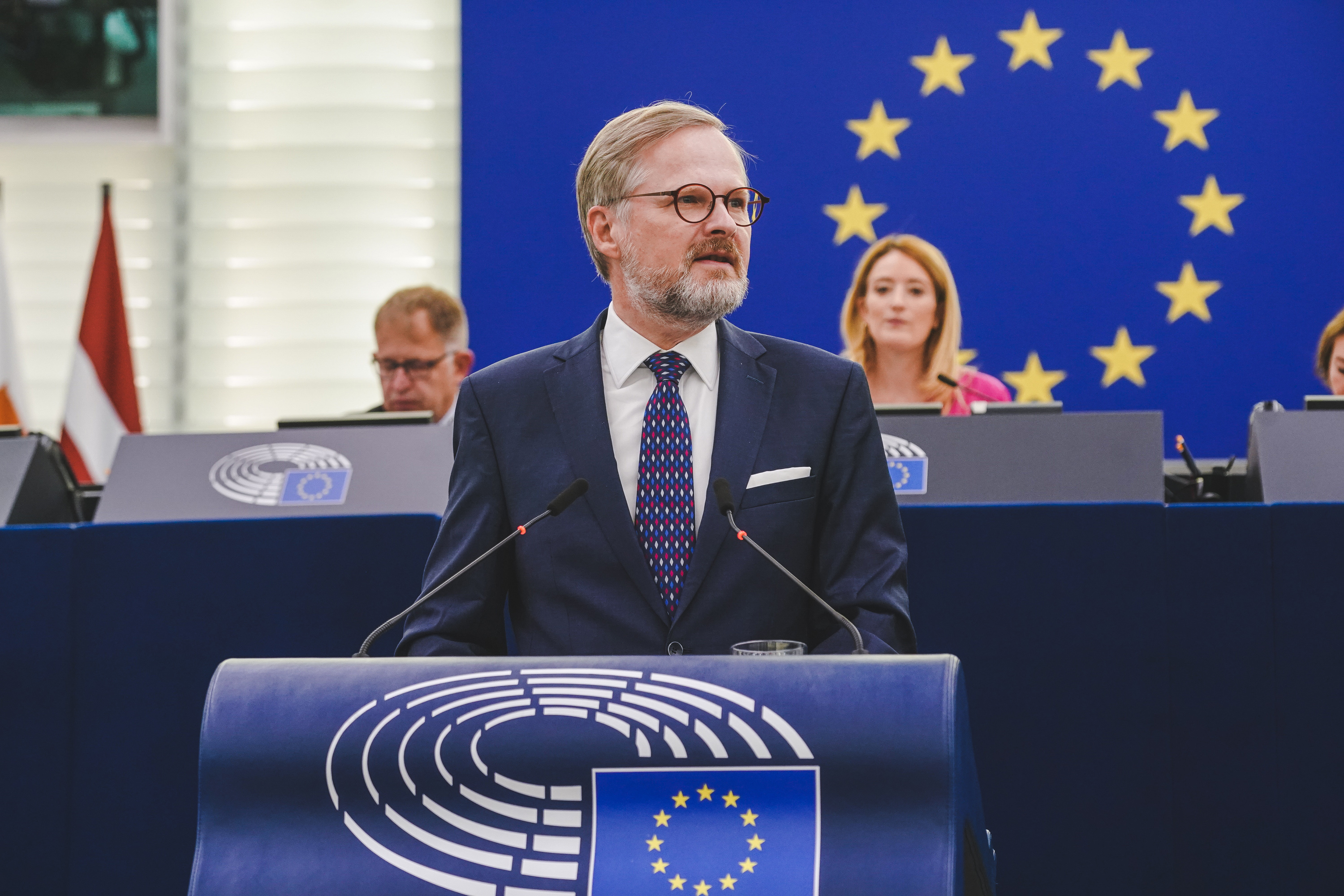
Fiala addresses the European Parliament, July 2022

In October 2015, Fiala called for a military invasion by Western ground forces in the Middle East, stating: "We will not solve the problem of migration and destabilization of the Middle East and North Africa unless we take military action." On the other hand, he opposed Russian involvement in the war against Islamic State.

In June 2018, commemorating displaced peoples and refugees, German Chancellor Angela Merkel condemned the expulsion of Germans from Czechoslovakia and other Central and Eastern European countries after World War II, arguing that there was no moral and political justification for the expulsion. Fiala responded that "pulling things out of the past with a one-sided interpretation certainly does not help the development of mutual relations."

In October 2019, he condemned the military aggression of Turkey, a NATO member state, against the Kurds in Rojava in northern Syria, stating that "the situation in the Middle East has deteriorated significantly since this Turkish military operation in northern Syria."

Fiala welcomed the victory of the ruling Law and Justice (PiS) party in the Polish parliamentary elections in October 2019, noting that ODS and PiS had been cooperating for a long time in a common European Parliament political group. He also stated that he would limit the negative impacts on Czech territory of mining in the Polish Turów brown coal mine near the Czech border.

Fiala supports Israel and its policies. He criticised Foreign Minister Tomáš Petříček, Minister of Culture Lubomír Zaorálek and former Foreign Minister Karel Schwarzenberg for their joint statement on 23 May 2020 condemning the planned Israeli annexation of Jewish settlements that Israel had built in the occupied West Bank since 1967.

In 2020, he supported the official visit of Czech Senate President Miloš Vystrčil and other Czech senators to Taiwan to express support for the country and its democracy.

In February 2024, some Czech public figures criticized Fiala's uncritical support for Israel.

In May 2024, he described the International Criminal Court's request for an arrest warrant against Israeli Prime Minister Benjamin Netanyahu and Israeli Defence Minister Yoav Gallant as "appalling and absolutely unacceptable", saying "We must not forget that it was Hamas that attacked Israel in October and killed, injured and kidnapped thousands of innocent people." When arrest warrants were issued in November 2024 against Netanyahu, Gallant, and former Hamas commander Mohammed Deif, Fiala criticised the decision, saying through a spokesperson that "the ICC weakens its authority in different cases when it puts the democratically-elected representatives of Israel on the same level as terrorist organizations".

Fiala welcomed the fall of the Assad regime in Syria, saying that "Assad's dependence on Russia ultimately failed". He voiced optimism for Syria's future, stressing the value of freedom and stability over anarchy or terrorist control.

== Controversies and criticism ==
=== Grants to CDK and aid to Myanmar ===
On 11 September 2021, one month prior to the 2021 Czech parliamentary election, the news website Parlamentní listy published an article alleging that Fiala received tens of millions Czech crowns in grants and subsidies through the Centre for the Study of Democracy and Culture (CDK). Although Fiala co-founded this organisation, he had ceased active involvement in 2004 upon his appointment as Rector of Masaryk University and in 2021 was not receiving any royalties. The alleged sum of 48 million Czech crowns was also misleading. It came from a website Hlídač státu, however the creator of the website Michal Bláha explained that this number includes subsidies shared between different organisations.

One heavily criticized grant was focused on help to Myanmar. CDK was receiving it from 2011 until 2017 and was cooperating on it with American orgnazations and Czech Ministry of Foreign Affairs. Fiala was part of the government from 2012 to 2013 as a Minister of Education, Youth and Sports and therefore he did not arrange this grant.

=== Links with PDZ ===
In January 2024, it was reported that Petr Fiala owned a stake in Podnikatelská družstevní záložna (PDZ) which he did not disclose in his tax return. In 2021, PDZ had been fined by the FAÚ for violating its obligation to supervise possible money laundering, and it was also fined by the Czech National Bank (ČNB) for not having a control system in place.

In February 2024, Seznam Zprávy published an investigation connecting PDZ with ODS affiliated think-tank Pravý břeh. This report built upon a previous investigation by Follow the Money, which in September 2023 published an article about donations from Czech companies with ties to Kamil Bahbouh to ECR affiliated think-tank New Direction. The combined value of these donations exceeded 200,000 Euro, surpassing the legal annual limit. Seznam Zprávy further uncovered that the involved Czech companies held stakes in PDZ and that Pravý Břeh had received from New Direction 280,000 Euro. According to the chairman of Pravý Břeh, František Mikš, the think-tank received the money through tenders for contracts to prepare expert studies.

In November 2025, police opened an investigation into Fiala's advisor Ivan Netuka related to contracts for medical supplies to the Institute for Clinical and Experimental Medicine (IKEM). Journalist Jaroslav Kmenta alleged that the timing of the investigation suggested that Fiala had been able to protect Netuka from law enforcement authorities until that point, and noted Netuka's links to PDZ, through which Fiala financed his campaign.

=== Comparisons with Germany ===
In November 2023, Fiala's marketing team posted a video on social media comparing the difference in quantity and price of Nutella in the Czech Republic and Germany. The video was widely criticised as having made the prime minister look ridiculous. Journalist Petr Kolář commented on the video, saying that he did not understand the message the prime minister wanted to convey, and noting that Fiala had earned the nickname Professor Nutella. Marketing strategist Petros Michopulos perceived the video as a copy of Andrej Babiš's style under PR director Marek Prchal, and criticized the communication style as inappropriate for Fiala.

In November 2024, Fiala stated that four more years of his government would be required to bring salaries in the Czech Republic up to German levels, which was criticised by economists as an unachievable populist statement. He also stated that the government had fulfilled 93% of its election program, which also triggered criticism from commentators over the government's budget policy, tax increases, and insufficient support for housing, teachers, and infrastructure.

== Personal life ==
Fiala is married to biologist Jana Fialová, whom he met as a student during the Velvet Revolution. They have three children. The eldest, Martin Fiala, graduated in art history from the Faculty of Arts at Masaryk University (MUNI). Klára Fialová (married name Chládková) studied medicine at the MUNI Faculty of Medicine, and the youngest, Jiří Fiala, enrolled to study history and economics. All three of Fiala's children graduated from the gymnazium on Kapitána Jaroše street, a school renowned for its focus on mathematics and natural sciences.

In 2024, Michal Chládek, the chairman of the ODS youth organization (Mladá ODS), married Fiala's daughter. In April 2025, it was reported that Chládek held five public positions, with a total monthly salary exceeding 100,000 CZK. In three of these positions, Chládek was reportedly absent more often than he was present. Chládek initially argued that he was able to manage all five positions, and stated that all his absences had been formally excused. However, investigative journalists found that for at least one of these roles, formal excuses were not required. Furthermore, discrepancies were reported between the number of informal excuses claimed and the actual attendance records. In early April 2025, Chládek resigned from three of his public positions following media scrutiny. Fiala defended Chládek, stating that he had not assisted him in obtaining the positions and that he held no influence over the appointments.

Fiala is a Roman Catholic and was baptized in 1986. He played football until the age of 40 and also enjoys tennis, shooting, skiing, swimming, jazz music and James Bond movies.

== Honours and awards ==
- Czech Republic:
  - 2010: Brno University of Technology awarded Fiala the Golden Medal of VUT for his cooperation with the university.
  - 28 January 2011: Rector of Masaryk University Mikuláš Bek awarded Fiala the Golden Medal of Masaryk University for Fiala's previous work as the university's Rector.
  - 26 August 2011: Václav Klaus awarded Fiala the Golden Plaque of the President of the Republic for his work as a Rector of Masaryk University. Fiala was the first Rector to receive the award.
  - 2022: Fiala was awarded the University of Ostrava Award for Freedom, Democracy, Bravery and Humanity after his visit to Kyiv during the 2022 Russian invasion of Ukraine.
- European Union:
  - 2002: Fiala was awarded the Jean Monnet Chair in European Political Integration.
- Poland:
  - 2022 Fiala was awarded the Man of the Year Award at the opening of the 31st Economic Forum in Karpacz.
- Ukraine:
  - 2022 Fiala was awarded the Order of Prince Yaroslav the Wise I degree by the President of Ukraine Volodymyr Zelenskyy.
- India:
  - 2024 The chancellor of NIMS University awarded Fiala with an honorary doctorate.
- Holy See:
  - 2025 Fiala was awarded the Knight Grand Cross of the Order of Pope Pius IX by the Pope Leo XIV.

== Bibliography ==
- Fiala, P.: Katolicismus a politika. Brno 1995. ISBN 80-85959-01-1.
- Fiala, P.: Německá politologie. Brno 1995. ISBN 80-85959-06-2.
- Fiala, P. (ed.): Politický extremismus a radikalismus v České republice. Brno 1998. ISBN 80-210-1798-8.
- Fiala, P. – Strmiska, M.: Teorie politických stran. Brno 1998. ISBN 80-85947-31-5.
- Fiala, P. – Hanuš, J.: Skrytá církev. Brno 1999. ISBN 80-85959-39-9.
- Fiala, P. – Hanuš, J. (eds.): Koncil a česká společnost. Brno 2000. ISBN 80-85959-75-5.
- Fiala, P. – Mikš, F. (eds.): Česká konzervativní a liberální politika. Brno 2000. ISBN 80-85959-73-9.
- Fiala, P. – Schubert, K.: Moderní analýza politiky. Brno 2000. ISBN 80-85947-50-1.
- Fiala, P. – Pitrová, M. (eds.): Rozšiřování ES/EU. Brno 2001. ISBN 80-210-2645-6.
- Fiala, P. – Hanuš, J. (eds.): Katolická církev a totalitarismus v českých zemích. Brno 2001. ISBN 80-85959-98-4.
- Fiala, P. – Holzer, J. – Strmiska, M. (eds.): Politické strany ve střední a východní Evropě. Brno 2002. ISBN 80-210-3036-4.
- Fiala, P. – Herbut, R. (eds.): Středoevropské systémy politických stran. Brno 2003. ISBN 80-210-3091-7.
- Fiala, P. – Pitrová, M.: Evropská unie. Brno 2003. ISBN 80-7325-015-2; 2nd ed. 2009. ISBN 978-80-7325-180-2.
- Antoszewski, A. – Fiala, P. – Herbut, R. – Sroka, J. (eds.): Partie i systemy partyjne Europy Środkowej. Wroclaw 2003. ISBN 83-229-2425-9.
- Fiala, P. – Hanuš, J.: Die Verborgene Kirche. Paderborn 2004. ISBN 3-506-72447-9.
- Fiala, P. – Hanuš, J. – Vybíral, J. (eds.): Katolická sociální nauka a současná věda. Brno, Praha 2004. ISBN 80-7325-024-1.
- Dančák, B. – Fiala, P. – Hloušek, V. (eds.): Evropeizace. Brno 2005. ISBN 80-210-3865-9.
- Dočkal, V. – Fiala, P. – Pitrová, M. – Kaniok, P. (eds.): Česká politika v Evropské unii. Brno 2006. ISBN 80-210-4076-9.
- Fiala, P. – Mareš, M. – Sokol, P.: Eurostrany. Brno 2007. ISBN 80-87029-05-4.
- Fiala, P.: Laboratoř sekularizace. Brno 2007. ISBN 978-80-7325-141-3.
- Fiala, P.: Evropský mezičas. Brno 2007. ISBN 80-87029-04-6; 2. aktualizované a rozšířené vydání 2010. ISBN 978-80-87029-99-2.
- Fiala, P. – Foral, J. – Konečný, K. – Marek, P. – Pehr, M. – Trapl, M. (eds.): Český politický katolicismus 1848–2005. Brno 2008. ISBN 978-80-7325-155-0.
- Fiala, P. a kol. (ed.): Evropeizace zájmů. Brno 2009. ISBN 978-80-210-4920-8.
- Balík, S. – Císař, O. – Fiala, P. (eds.): Veřejné politiky v České republice v letech 1989–2009. Brno 2010.
- Fiala, P.: Politika, jaká nemá být. Brno 2010. ISBN 978-80-7325-216-8.
- Fiala, P.: Na konci bezstarostnosti. Brno 2015. ISBN 978-80-7485-038-7.
- Fiala, P.: Občané, demokraté a straníci. Brno 2015. ISBN 978-80-7325-320-2.
- Balaštík M., Fiala P.: Profesor na frontové linii: Rozhovor Miroslava Balaštíka. Brno 2017. ISBN 978-80-7485-124-7.
- Fiala, P.: Rozum a odvaha. Brno 2017. ISBN 978-80-7485-131-5.
- Balík, S. – Fiala, P. – Hanuš, J. – Mikš, F.: Manifest čtyř: Program pro přátele svobody. Brno 2017. ISBN 978-80-7485-135-3.
- Fiala, P. – Hanuš, J.: Vraťme politice smysl! Rozhovory s Jiřím Hanušem. Brno 2017. ISBN 978-80-7485-136-0.
- Fiala, P.: Jak uvařit demokracii: Od vládní agonie k polokomunistické vládě. Brno 2017. ISBN 978-80-7485-168-1.
- Fiala, P. – Mikš, F.: Konzervatismus dnes: Politika, společnost a zdravý rozum v době nerozumu. Brno 2019. ISBN 978-80-7485-186-5.
- Fiala, P. – Mikš, F. (eds.): Listopad 1989 včera a dnes: Mánesovská setkávání. Brno 2019.
- Fiala P.: [M]UNIVERZITA: Poslání, výzvy a proměny ve 21. století. Brno 2019. ISBN 978-80-7485-184-1.
- Fiala, P. – Dvořák, P. – Krutílek, O.: Politika v čase koronaviru: Předběžná analýza. Brno 2020. ISBN 978-80-7485-209-1.

== See also ==
- List of prime ministers of the Czech Republic

Academic offices
Preceded by Jiří Zlatuška	Rector of Masaryk University; 2004–2011	Succeeded by Mikuláš Bek
Political offices
Preceded by Josef Dobeš	Minister of Education, Youth and Sports; 2012–2013	Succeeded by Dalibor Štys
Preceded by Andrej Babiš	Prime Minister of the Czech Republic; 2021–2025	Succeeded by Andrej Babiš
Party political offices
Preceded by Petr Nečas	Leader of the Civic Democratic Party; 2014–2026	Succeeded by Martin Kupka
