= Jiří Zlatuška =

Czech politician, informatician, and educator (born 1957)

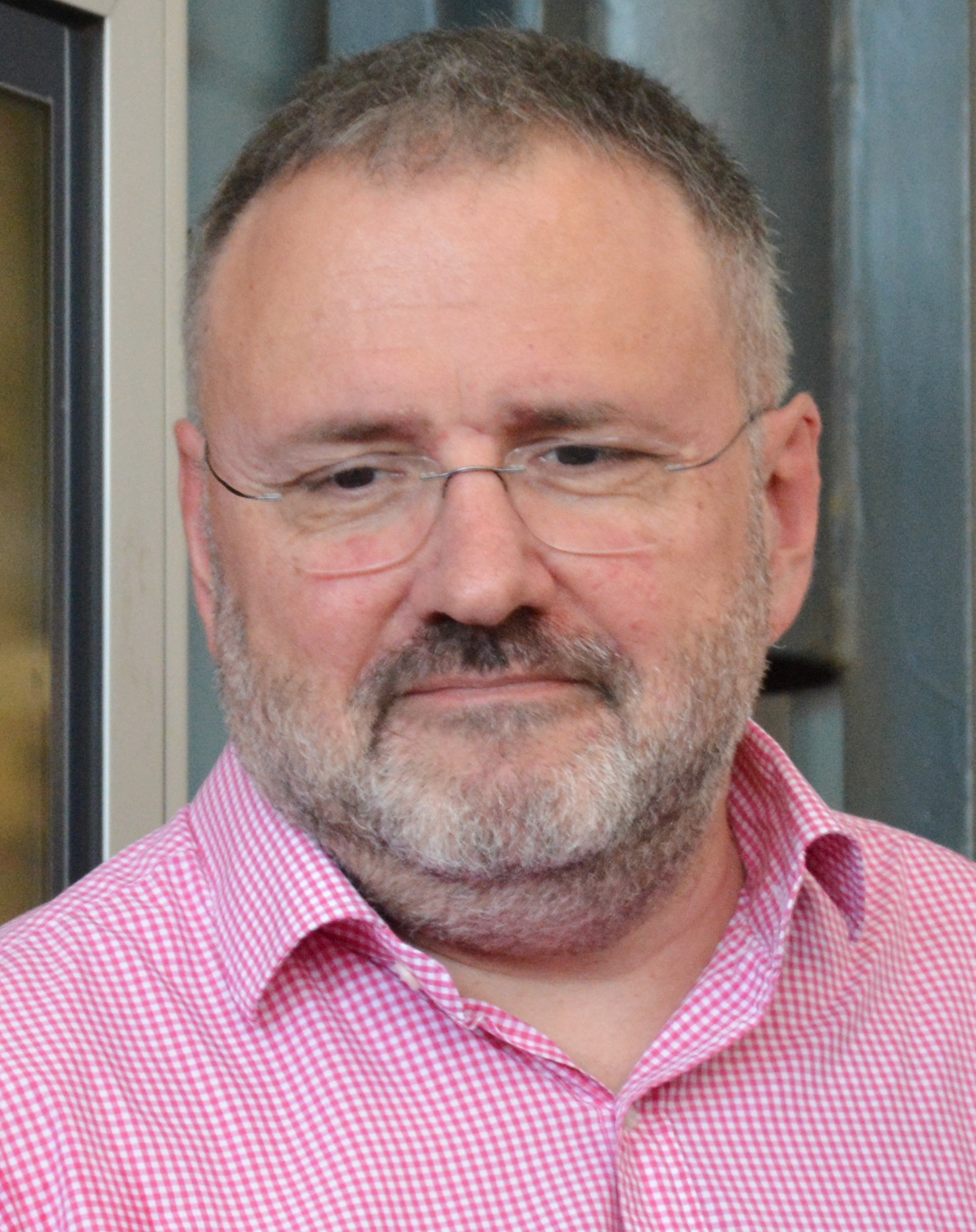
- Jiří Zlatuška in 2015

Senator from Brno
- In office 2 November 2002 – 2 November 2008
- Preceded by: Jan Zahradníček
- Succeeded by: Miloš Janeček

Member of the Chamber of Deputies
- In office 26 October 2013 – 26 October 2017

Personal details
- Born: 15 September 1957 (age 69) Brno, Czechoslovakia
- Party: ANO 2011 (2013–2017/18)
- Education: Masaryk University

Jiří Zlatuška (born 15 September 1957 in Brno) is a Czech informaticist, university professor and politician. He was elected in the parliamentary election in 2013 to the Chamber of Deputies on the ANO 2011 platform. From 2015 to 2019, he was the Dean of the Faculty of Informatics of the Masaryk University.

Zlatuška served in the Chamber of Deputies of the Czech Republic from 2013 to 2017 with ANO 2011, and he was a prominent ally of Andrej Babiš. Zlatuška later said that he regretted supporting Babiš, criticizing his nativist policies and accusing him of becoming too populist. Zlatuška previously served as the rector of Masaryk University.

Academic offices
Preceded by Eduard Schmidt	Rector of Masaryk University; 1998–2004	Succeeded by Petr Fiala
