= 2014 Civic Democratic Party leadership election =

Czech political party leadership election

- 18 January 2014
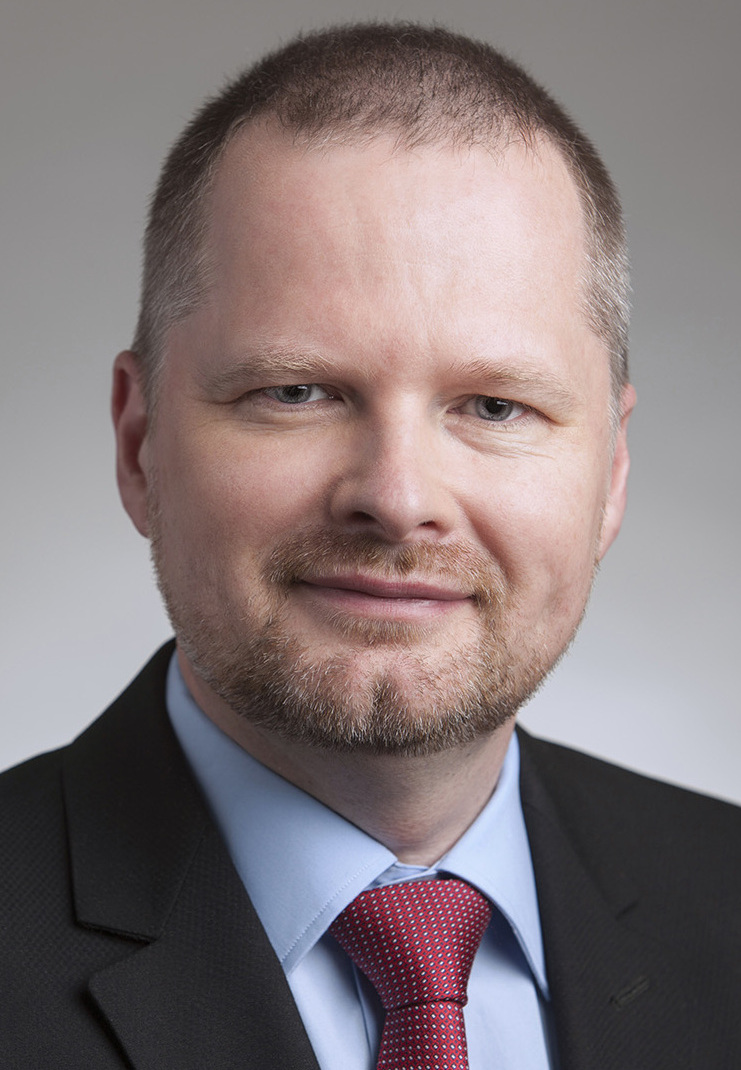

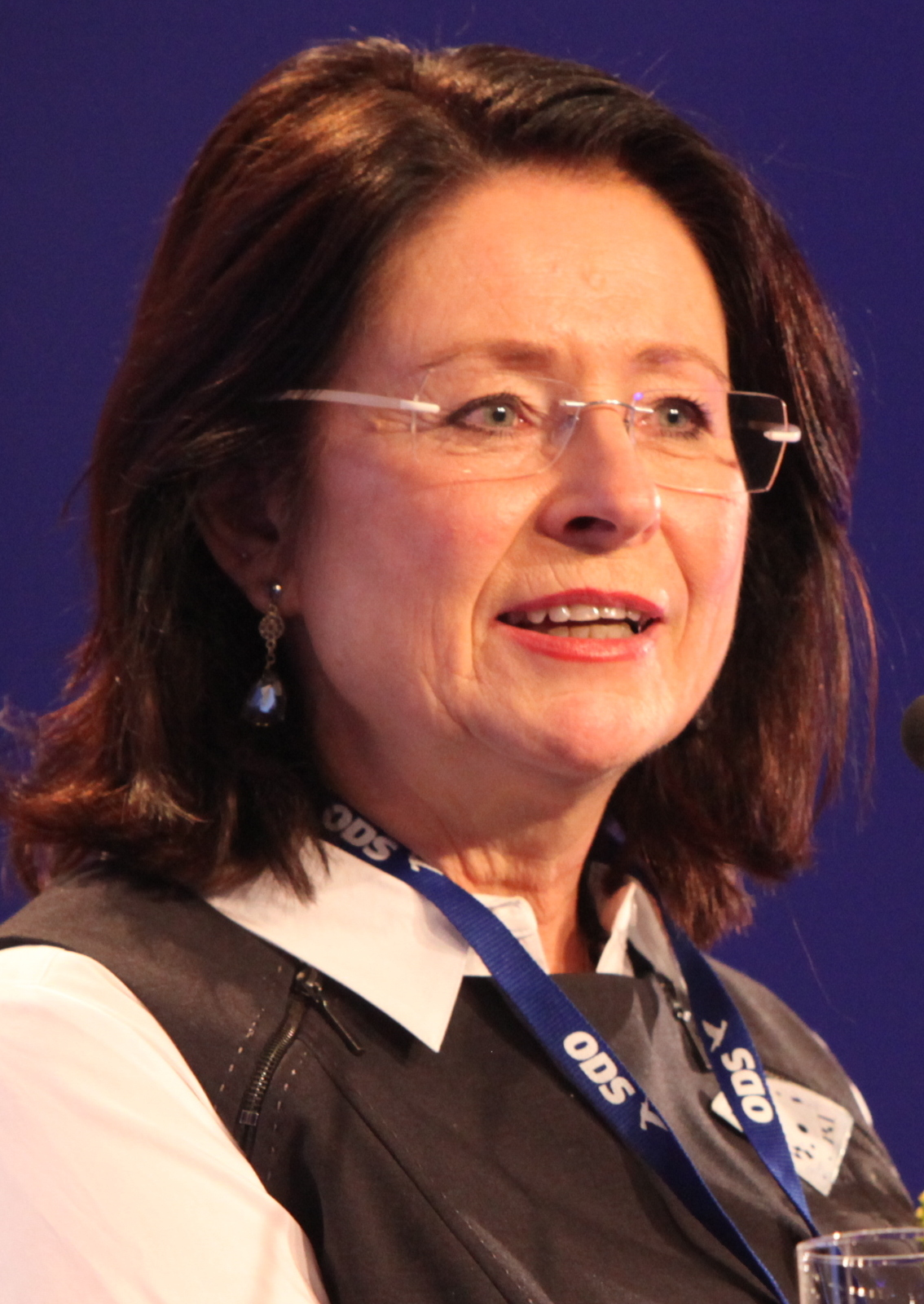

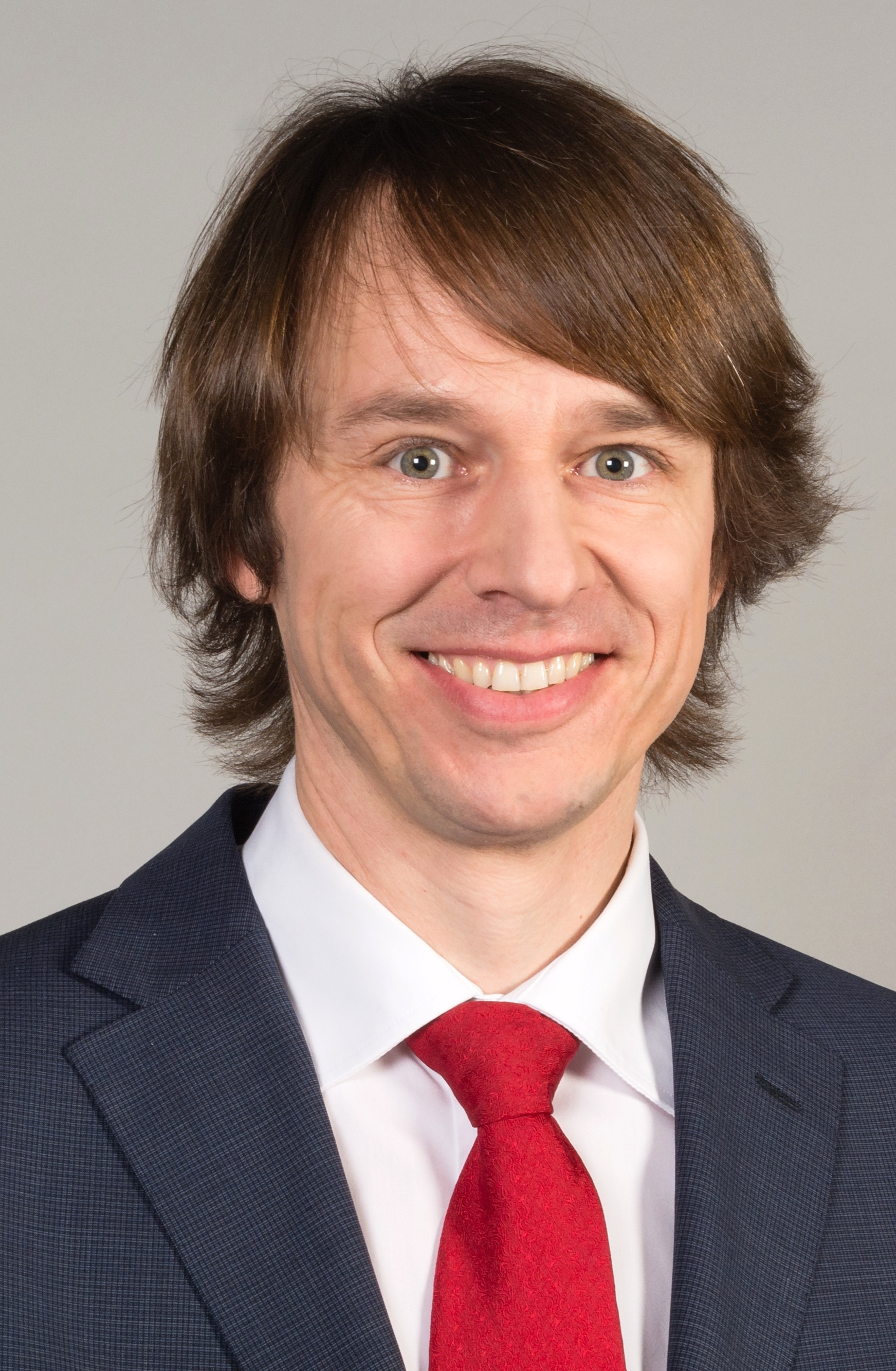
Candidate	Petr Fiala	Miroslava Němcová	Edvard Kožušník
Electoral vote	437	66	32
Percentage	81.68%	12.34%	5.98%
Leader of ODS before election
Martin Kuba (acting)
Elected Leader of ODS
Petr Fiala

The Civic Democratic Party (ODS) leadership election of 2014 was a result of party's electoral defeat in 2013 legislative election. Candidates include former Minister of Education and Chairman of Masaryk University Petr Fiala, former Prime Minister candidate Miroslava Němcová and MEP Edvard Kožušník. Fiala was nominated by 12 regional organisations and thus was considered a front-runner. Fiala was also endorsed by acting leader of ODS Martin Kuba. Edvard Kožušník was endorsed by Liberec Region organisation of ODS. Over 500 delegates voted.

Petr Fiala won a landslide victory when he received 437 votes. Fiala said that he wants to change political culture in ODS and that he wants to be a leader similar to Václav Klaus and Margaret Thatcher.

== Background ==
Previous leader of ODS and Prime Minister Petr Nečas had to resign as a result of 2013 political corruption scandal. Martin Kuba became acting leader of ODS while Miroslava Němcová was nominated to the position of Prime Minister. President Miloš Zeman refused to appoint Němcová as a Prime Minister and called on early elections on 25–26 October 2013. ODS was heavily defeated and gained only 16 Seats in Chamber of Deputies. Leadership of the party then resigned.

Miroslava Němcová announced on 6 December 2013 that she doesn't intend to run for a position of party's leader. Some sources stated that her decision was to give opportunity to former Minister of Education Petr Fiala whose candidacy was speculated. Petr Fiala announced his candidacy on 7 December 2013. He stated that ODS ceased to function as a political party and Fiala quickly gathered support from regional organisations and many influential members of the party. Jiří Pospíšil expressed his support to Fiala. On 19 December 2013, Němcová reportedly announced her candidature to Civic Democratic members of parliament. She refused to announce her candidacy publicly.

Edvard Kožušník announced his candidacy on 8 January 2014. He received nomination from Liberec regional organisation. Fiala stated that he is glad to not be the only candidate. Fiala was nominated by 12 regional organisations. Němcová didn't receive any regional nomination.

== Candidates ==
- Petr Fiala, University professor, MP and former Minister of Education. He joined the party in November 2013. He was a front-runner in the election.
- Edvard Kožušník, MEP and Chairman of EStat.cz.
- Miroslava Němcová, MP and party's electoral leader in 2013 legislative election. She unsuccessfully ran for leadership in 2002.

=== Refused ===
- Martin Kuba, acting leader of ODS. He announced that he won't run after the party's failure in the 2013 legislative election.
- Bohuslav Svoboda, former Mayor of Prague. He stated that he will run if Němcová decides to not participate in the election.
- Jan Zahradil, MEP. His candidacy was speculated. He refused to run.

== Opinion polling ==
Poll	Petr Fiala	Miroslava Němcová	Jiří Pospíšil	Bohuslav Svoboda
21 November 2014, iDnes	72.16%	19.29%	14.61%	3.63%

== Voting ==
Candidate	Vote	%
Petr Fiala	437	81.7
Miroslava Němcová	66	12.3
Edvard Kožušník	32	6.0

Fiala's nomination speech received standing ovation while Němcová's speech was noted by hurtful feeling. Kožušník's speech was received negatively. Fiala won the election by a large margin, being elected in the first round. Němcová was visibly disappointed and stated that the result isn't fair when she considers how much she did for the party.
