= South Bohemian Region =

Region of the Czech Republic

Coordinates: 49°05′N 14°40′E

South Bohemian Region Jihočeský kraj
- Region
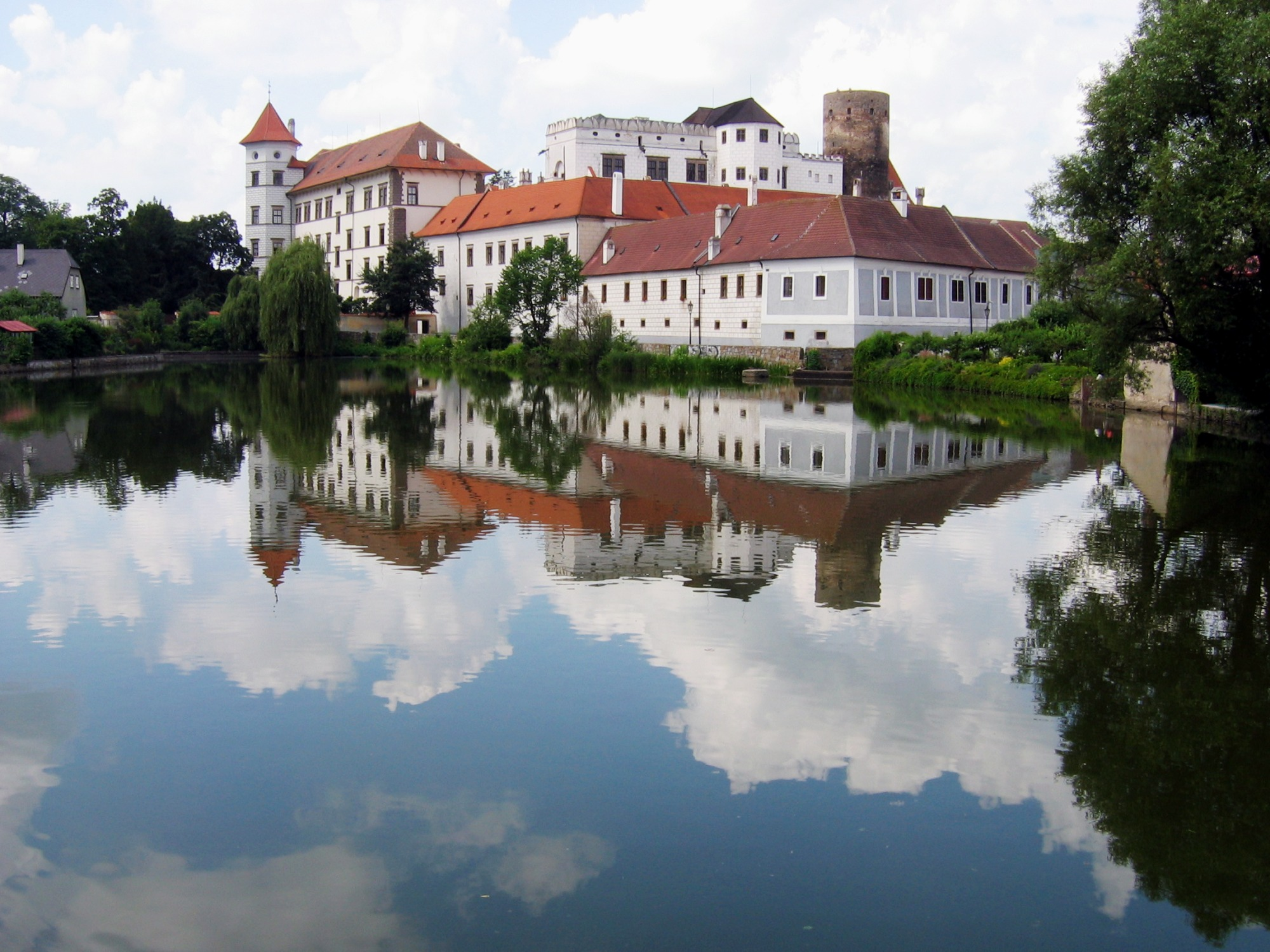
- Jindřichův Hradec castle

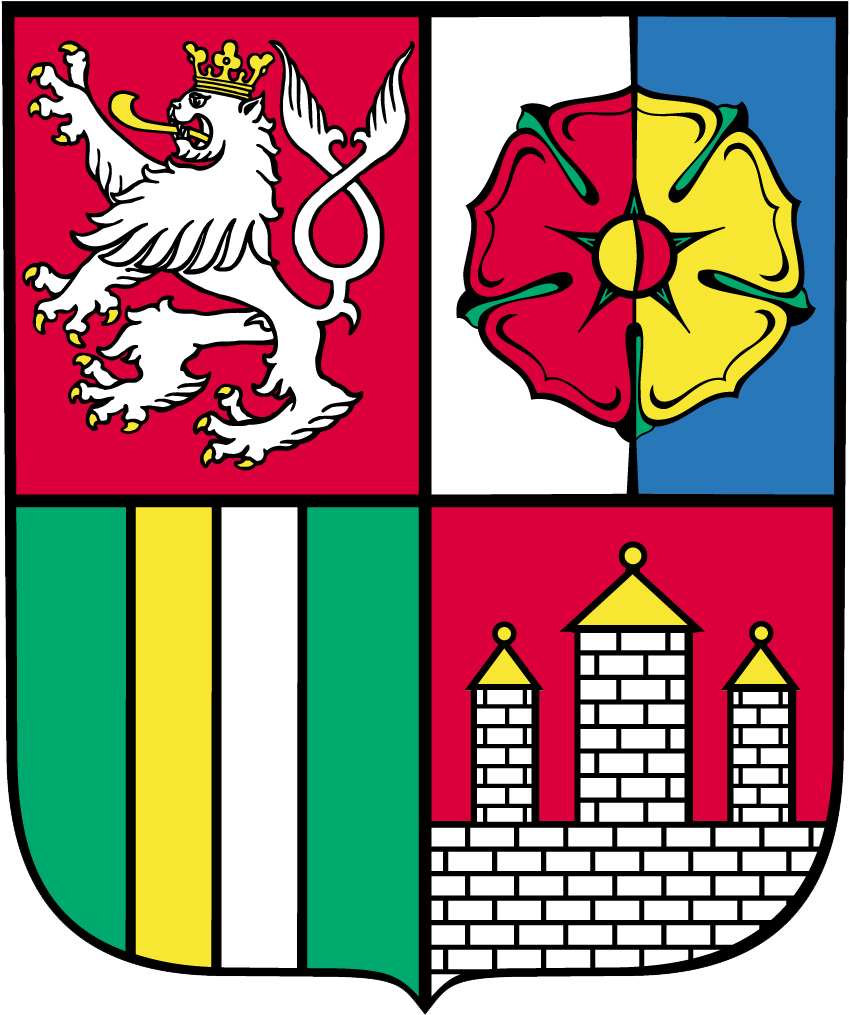
- Flag Coat of arms

- Country: Czech Republic
- Capital: České Budějovice
- Districts: Český Krumlov, Jindřichův Hradec, Písek, Prachatice, Strakonice, Tábor

Government
  - Governor: Martin Kuba (Our Czechia)

Area
  - Total: 10,056.79 km^{2} (3,882.95 sq mi)
- Highest elevation: 1,378 m (4,521 ft)

Population (2024-01-01)
  - Total: 654,505
  - Density: 65.0809/km^{2} (168.559/sq mi)

GDP
  - Total: CZK 291.708 billion (€11.377 billion)
- ISO 3166 code: CZ-31
- Vehicle registration: C
- Website: www.kraj-jihocesky.cz

The South Bohemian Region (Czech: Jihočeský kraj) is an administrative unit (kraj) of the Czech Republic, located mostly in the southern part of its historical land of Bohemia, with a small part in southwestern Moravia. The western part of the South Bohemian Region is former Prácheňsko, a huge archaic region with distinctive features with its capital, Písek. In 2011, there were 624 municipalities in the region, whereof 54 had a status of a town.

The region borders (from the west clockwise) the regions of Plzeň, Central Bohemian, Vysočina and South Moravian. To the south, it borders Austria (Lower Austria and Upper Austria) and Germany (Bavaria). Until 30 May 2001, the region was named as Budějovický kraj or Českobudějovický kraj, after its capital, České Budějovice.

Due to its geographical location and natural surroundings the region belongs to the first settlements that appeared in the distant past. Over the past centuries, the South Bohemian region has been known for fishpond cultivation and forestry. The region has been industrialized since the beginning of the twentieth century. Nowadays, it is a tourist destination due to its natural and historical richness, and the fastest growing industry has been the travel industry.

== History ==
On 1 May 1939 the Reichsgau Oberdonau was created by the Nazis in accordance with the Ostmark law of 14 April 1939 on the territory of Upper Austria following the Anschluss (annexation of Austria) in autumn 1938. This encompassed those districts of South Bohemia (Kaplitz und Krumau) that had long been settled by Germans. This was reversed after the Second World War and the German-speaking population that had lived in the area since the Middle Ages was expelled. Until 2001 the region of South Bohemia was called "Budějovický kraj".

== Administrative divisions ==
The South Bohemian Region was established with constitutional Act No. 347/97 of Collections concerning the formation of higher territorial administrative units. The region and its authorities are specified by Act No. 129-2000 of Collections concerning regions, which came into effect on the day of the regional authorities elections, 1 January 2001. The region is divided into 7 districts:

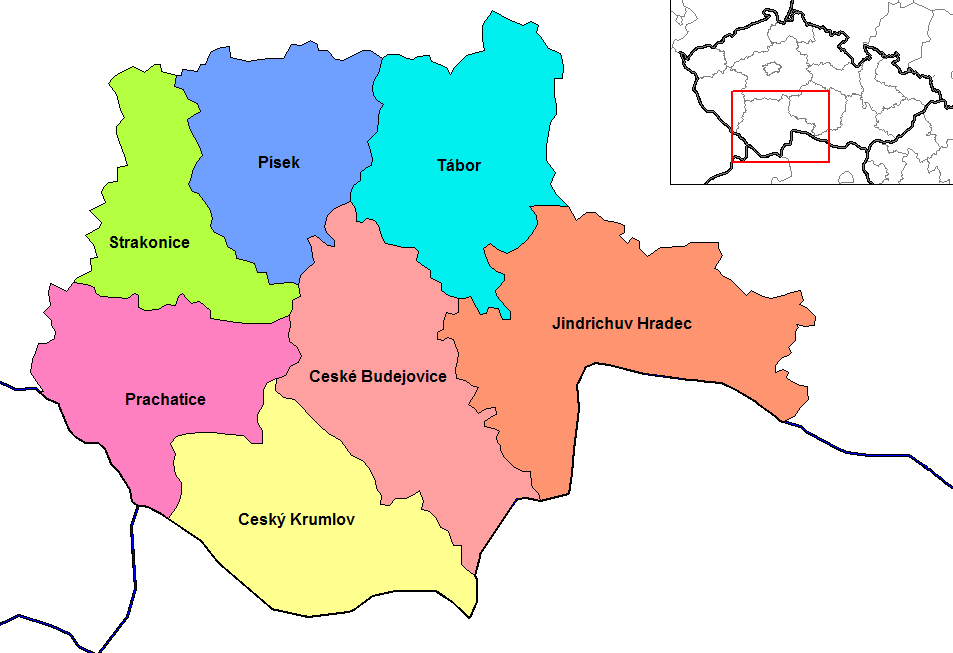
Districts of South Bohemian Region

| České Budějovice |
| Český Krumlov |
| Jindřichův Hradec |

| Písek |
| Prachatice |
| Strakonice |

| Tábor |

== Population and area ==
The total area of the region is 10,057 km^{2} which is 12.8% of the total area of the Czech Republic. As of 2024, South Bohemian Region's population is 654,505 and with only 65 people per square kilometer, the region has the lowest population density in the whole country. The reasons are natural conditions, historical isolation and the removal of the German population from the border area of the region after World War II.

64.2% of the region's population lives in towns or cities. One-third of the inhabitants live in the five largest municipalities. Only 4% of region's population lives in municipalities with less than 200 inhabitants.

As of 2024, the average age in the region is 43.3 years. Approximately 11% of inhabitants who were 15 years or older had a university degree (in 2001 this was 8%). According to the 2011 census, 20.6% of inhabitants in the region believe in God (however, almost half of the people did not answer this question). The table below gives an overview of the 10 most populated towns and cities in the region (as of 1 January 2024).

| Name | Population | Area (km^{2}) | District |
|---|---|---|---|
| České Budějovice | 97,377 | 56 | České Budějovice District |
| Tábor | 34,370 | 62 | Tábor District |
| Písek | 30,986 | 63 | Písek District |
| Strakonice | 22,522 | 35 | Strakonice District |
| Jindřichův Hradec | 20,747 | 74 | Jindřichův Hradec District |
| Český Krumlov | 12,944 | 22 | Český Krumlov District |
| Prachatice | 11,250 | 39 | Prachatice District |
| Milevsko | 8,040 | 42 | Písek District |
| Třeboň | 8,262 | 98 | Jindřichův Hradec District |
| Týn nad Vltavou | 7,850 | 43 | České Budějovice District |

Other significant towns are: Vimperk, Dačice, Kaplice, Soběslav, Sezimovo Ústí, Vodňany, Blatná, Veselí nad Lužnicí, Bechyně and Protivín. The following table provides more details on the districts of the South Bohemian Region:

| District | Population | Area | Pop. Dens. | No.of Settlements |
|---|---|---|---|---|
| České Budějovice (CB) | 201,926 | 1,638.30 | 123 | 109 |
| Český Krumlov (CK) | 62,072 | 1,615.03 | 38 | 47 |
| Jindřichův Hradec (JH) | 90,246 | 1,943.69 | 46 | 106 |
| Písek (PI) | 72,851 | 1,126.84 | 64 | 75 |
| Prachatice (PT) | 51,474 | 1,375.03 | 37 | 65 |
| Strakonice (ST) | 71,764 | 1,032.10 | 69 | 112 |
| Tábor (TA) | 104,172 | 1,326.01 | 78 | 110 |

Historical population

| Year | Pop. | ±% |
|---|---|---|
| 1869 | 689,119 | — |
| 1880 | 722,344 | +4.8% |
| 1890 | 716,055 | −0.9% |
| 1900 | 735,548 | +2.7% |
| 1910 | 753,069 | +2.4% |

| Year | Pop. | ±% |
|---|---|---|
| 1921 | 737,328 | −2.1% |
| 1930 | 718,874 | −2.5% |
| 1950 | 550,911 | −23.4% |
| 1961 | 573,713 | +4.1% |
| 1970 | 577,543 | +0.7% |

| Year | Pop. | ±% |
|---|---|---|
| 1980 | 613,171 | +6.2% |
| 1991 | 622,889 | +1.6% |
| 2001 | 625,267 | +0.4% |
| 2011 | 628,336 | +0.5% |
| 2021 | 631,803 | +0.6% |

Source: Censuses

== Geography ==
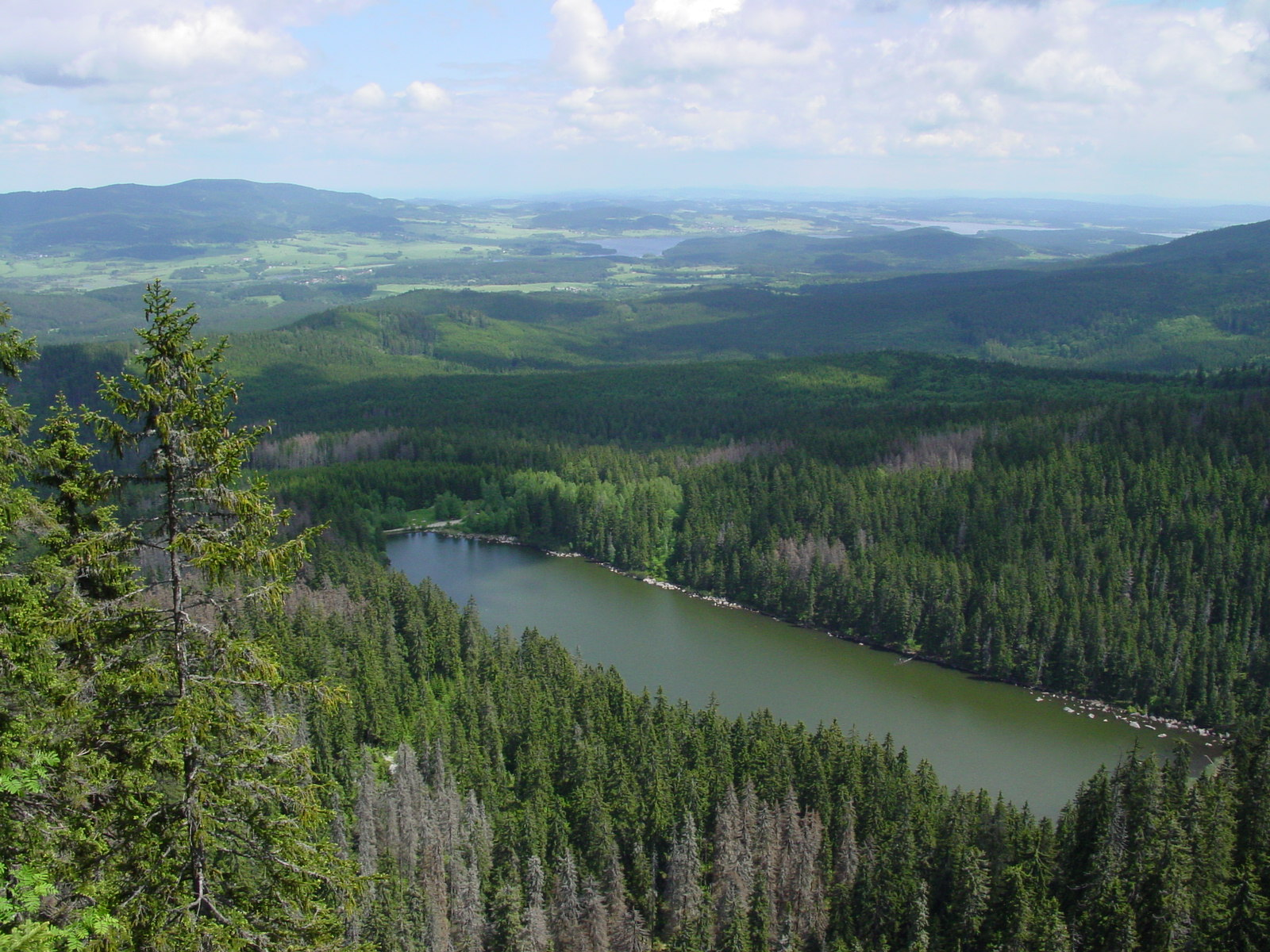
Plešné Lake

The central part of the South Bohemian Region consists of the České Budějovice Basin and Třeboň Basin. The southwest consists of the Bohemian Forest mountain range and its foothills, the Gratzen Mountains and its foothills are located to the south. The northern part of the region extends to the Central Bohemian Uplands. The eastern part lies in the Bohemian-Moravian Highlands. The highest elevation in the region is the 1,378-metre (4,521 ft) high Plechý in the Bohemian Forest, the lowest elevation with 350 m (1,150 ft) above sea level is at the Orlík Dam.

The region is located in the drainage basin of Vltava river. Other significant rivers are Malše, Lužnice, Otava, Nežárka and Lomnice. South Bohemia is known for its many ponds. In the past, more than seven thousand ponds were established across the region. With its 489 ha Rožmberk is the largest one, followed by Bezdrev (450 ha) and Horusice pond (415 ha). In the 20th century, a series of dams were constructed on the Vltava river. Lipno Reservoir is the largest reservoir in the Czech Republic and has an area of 4,870 ha. Other dams in the region are Orlík Dam, Římov Dam and Hněvkovice Dam.

A big part of the Šumava National Park is situated in South Bohemia. The Bohemian Forest is a holiday destination, in particular, with hikers. Many natural and cultural sights are connected with more than 500 km of summer marked trails and bike trails.

== Climate ==
The climate in South Bohemia is of a transitional Central European type. It is affected alternatively by an oceanic influence from the west, and a continental influence from the east. Therefore, the weather can be variable. Most of the South Bohemian region belongs to the mild, warm and wet zone and at altitudes above 750 m, this passes to mild and cool. The warmest month is usually July, with temperatures averaging between 17 and 18 °C in valley areas. In higher localities (over 900 m) the temperatures can drop below 14 °C. Days with temperatures above 25 °C are most frequently in valley-basins, and the area around the confluence of the rivers Lužnice and Vltava (Moldau): on average there are 40-50 such days a year.

== Economy ==
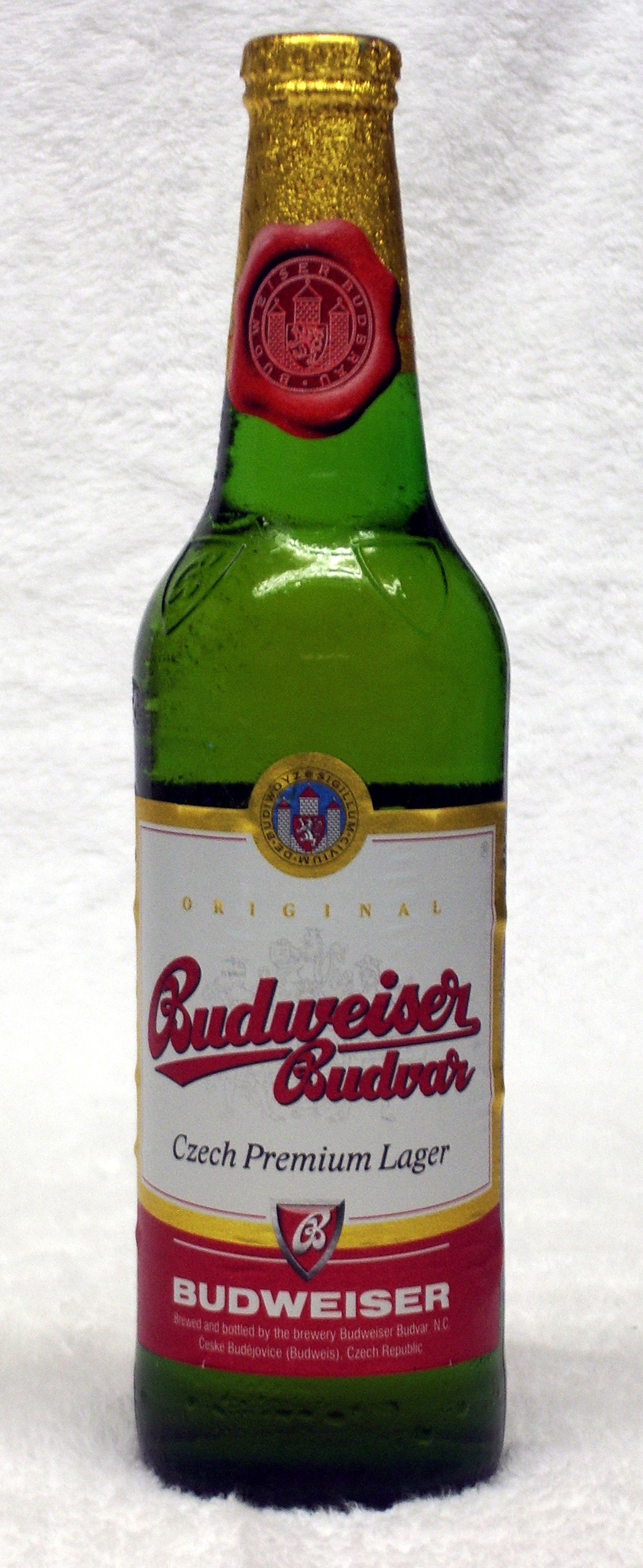
500ml bottle of Budweiser Budvar, as marketed in the UK

In 2021, the region produced 4,8% of the national GDP. The GDP per capita is 79% of the national average. It's the 11th position out of 14 among all regions. In 2011, the business sector in the South Bohemian Region comprises 159,000 entities, 114,000 of which were sole traders. There are more than 300 thousand people employed in the region, whereof 31% in industry, 13% in trade and 10% in construction sector. The average salary in the region in September 2013 was CZK 21,768 (approximately EUR 850). The unemployment rate in September 2013 was 6.05%.

The Region does not rank among key industrial areas of the Czech Republic. The industrial production is concentrated particularly in the area of České Budějovice and in Tábor District and Strakonice District. The food and drink processing industries play a significant role in the region. Other important sectors are the automotive industry, production of machinery and appliances, and also the textile and clothing industries. Recently, the travel industry has become an important sector in the region.

The Czech Academy of Sciences, whose institutes operate all over the region, provides a good base for the development of science. These institutes focus mostly on biology and ecology. Scientific work is also part of the activities of the University of South Bohemia (Czech: Jihočeská univerzita) with its headquarters in České Budějovice and Jindřichův Hradec.

Approximately 11% of the national agricultural production is produced in the South Bohemian Region. The agricultural sector focuses on plant production, mostly on growing cereals, oil plants, and potatoes. In animal husbandry, the breeding of cattle and pigs prevails. Fishpond cultivation has a long tradition in South Bohemia. Fish husbandry in the total area of 25 000 ha makes up about 50% of the total national production.

== Architecture ==
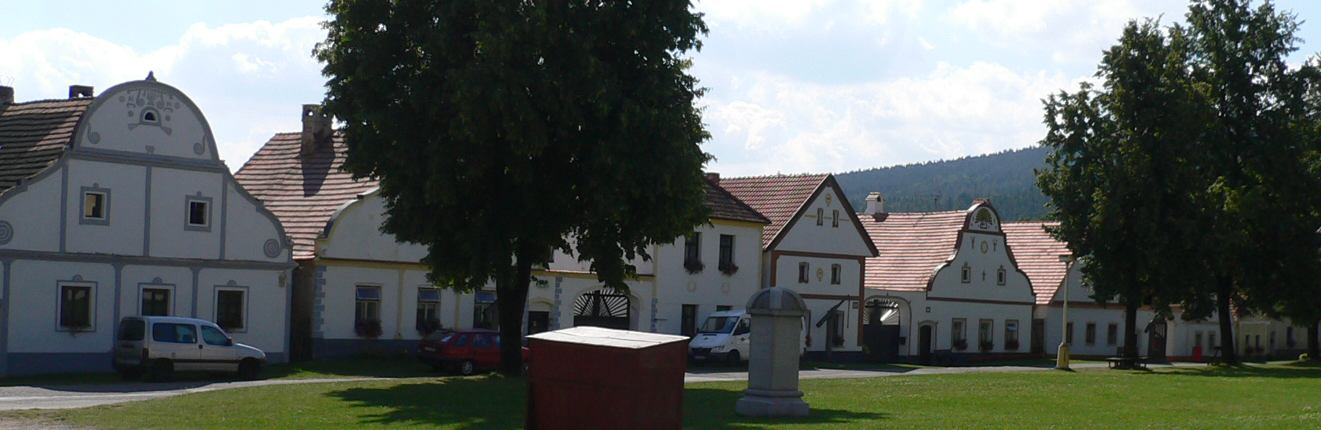
Rustic baroque in Holašovice

The region is famous for its small villages with a pond in the middle. These are generally built in the style of the Rustic Baroque, also known as South Bohemian Baroque:

"Rustic Baroque is a term for the unique architecture of South Bohemia. The local folk bricklayer masters Martin Paták and František Šoch created a new type of South Bohemian farmhouse with an ornate frontispiece in the middle of the 19th century. A typical building of this style is a massive rustic farmhouse with two richly decorated frontispieces, which are joined by an arched gate with small doors. The marshland frontispieces are beautifully decorated, they have lavish contours, the surface is usually divided by allusive decorative columns, completed by arches, stylised hearts, four-leafed clovers, meadow flowers."

== Gallery ==
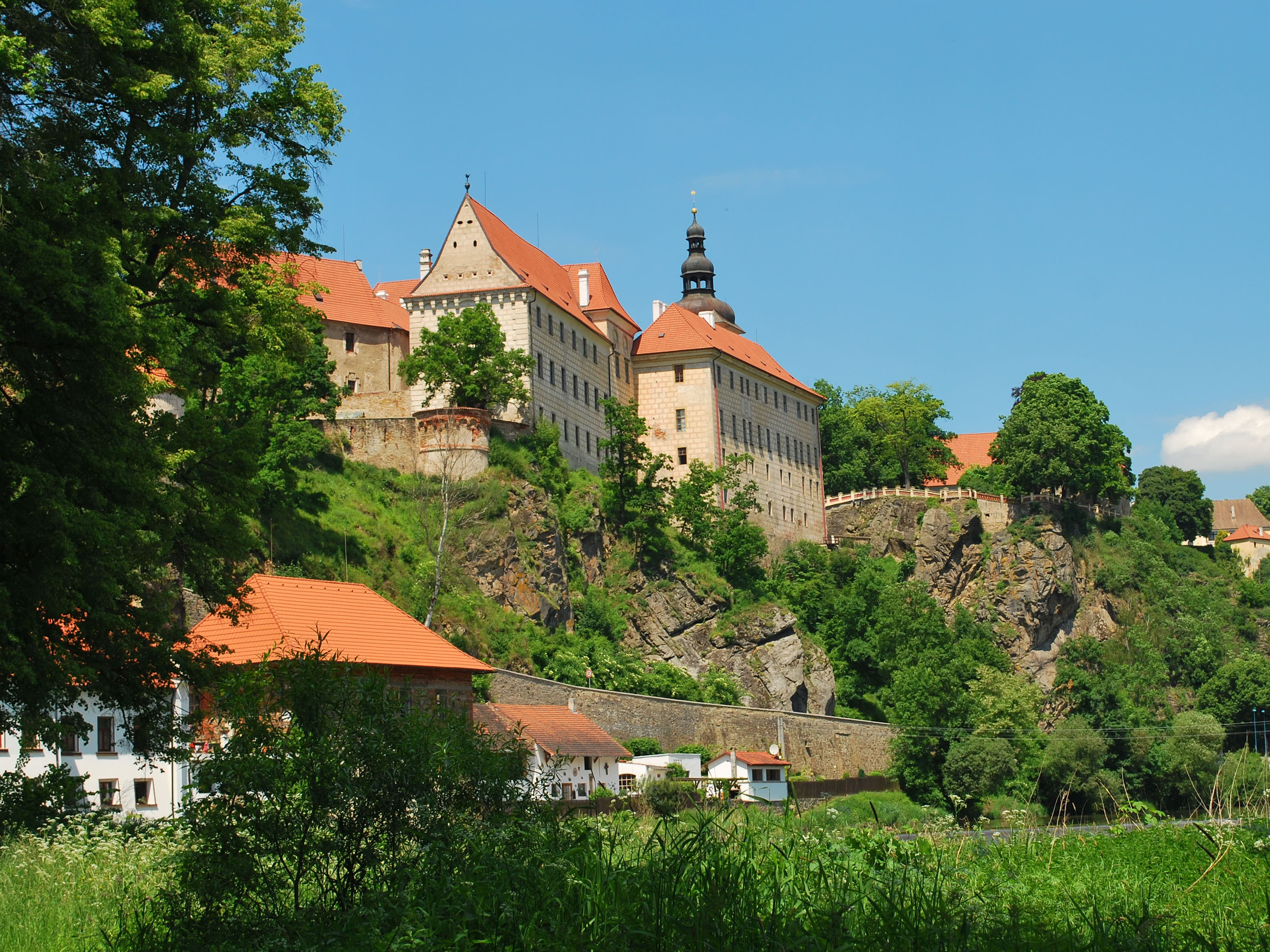
Chateau in Bechyně

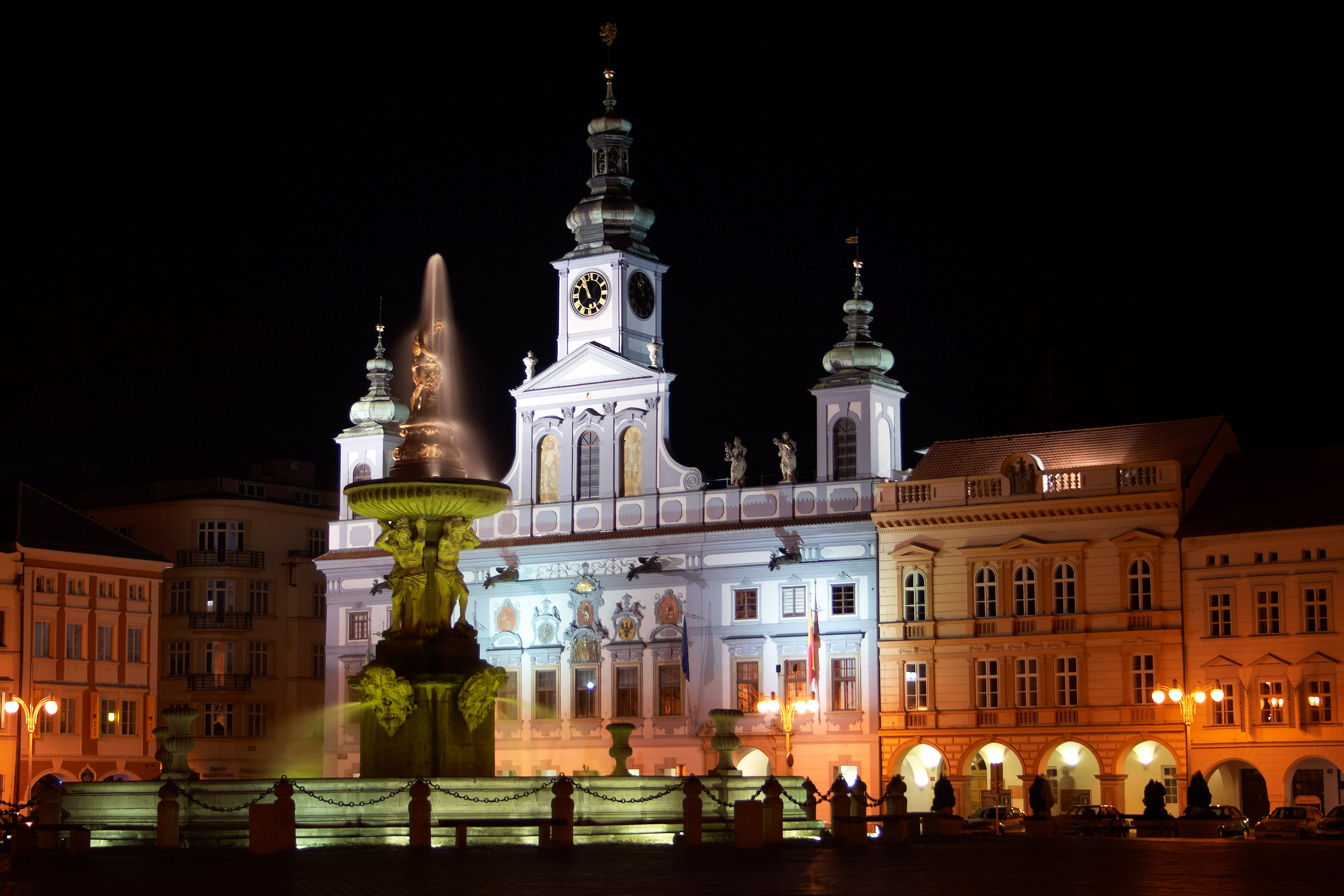
Přemysl Otakar II Square in České Budějovice

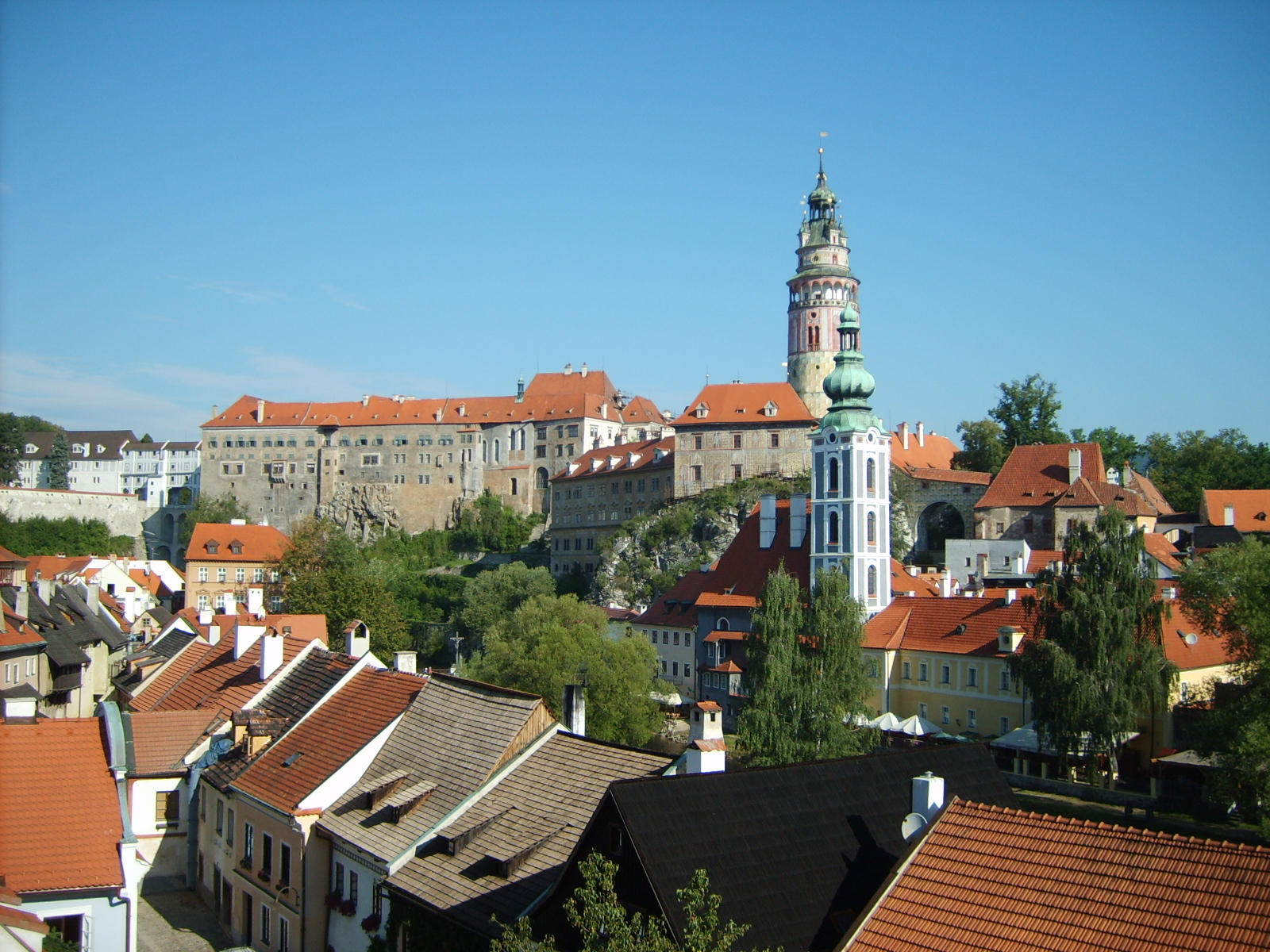
Castle in Český Krumlov

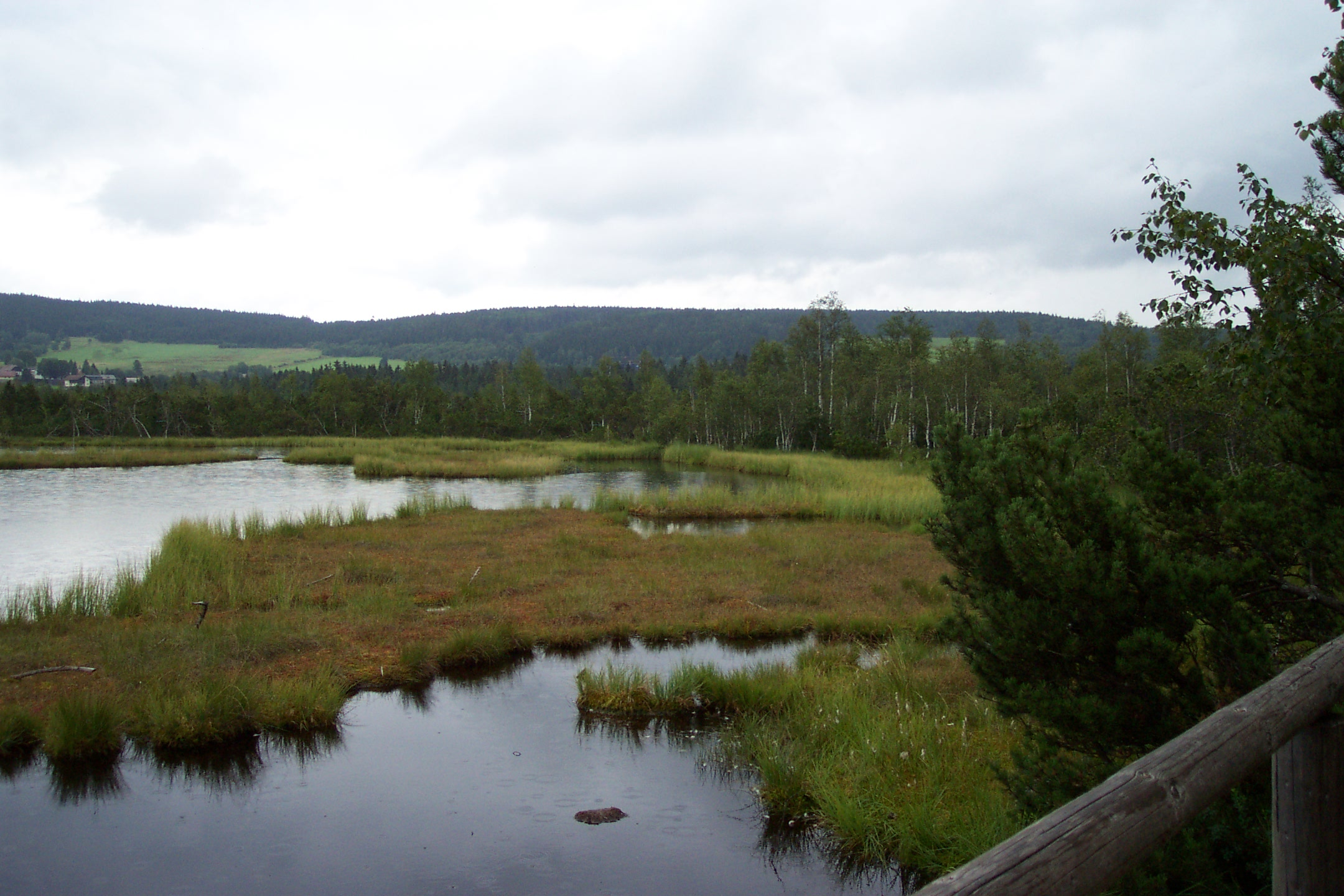
Chalupská slať peat bog in the Bohemian Forest

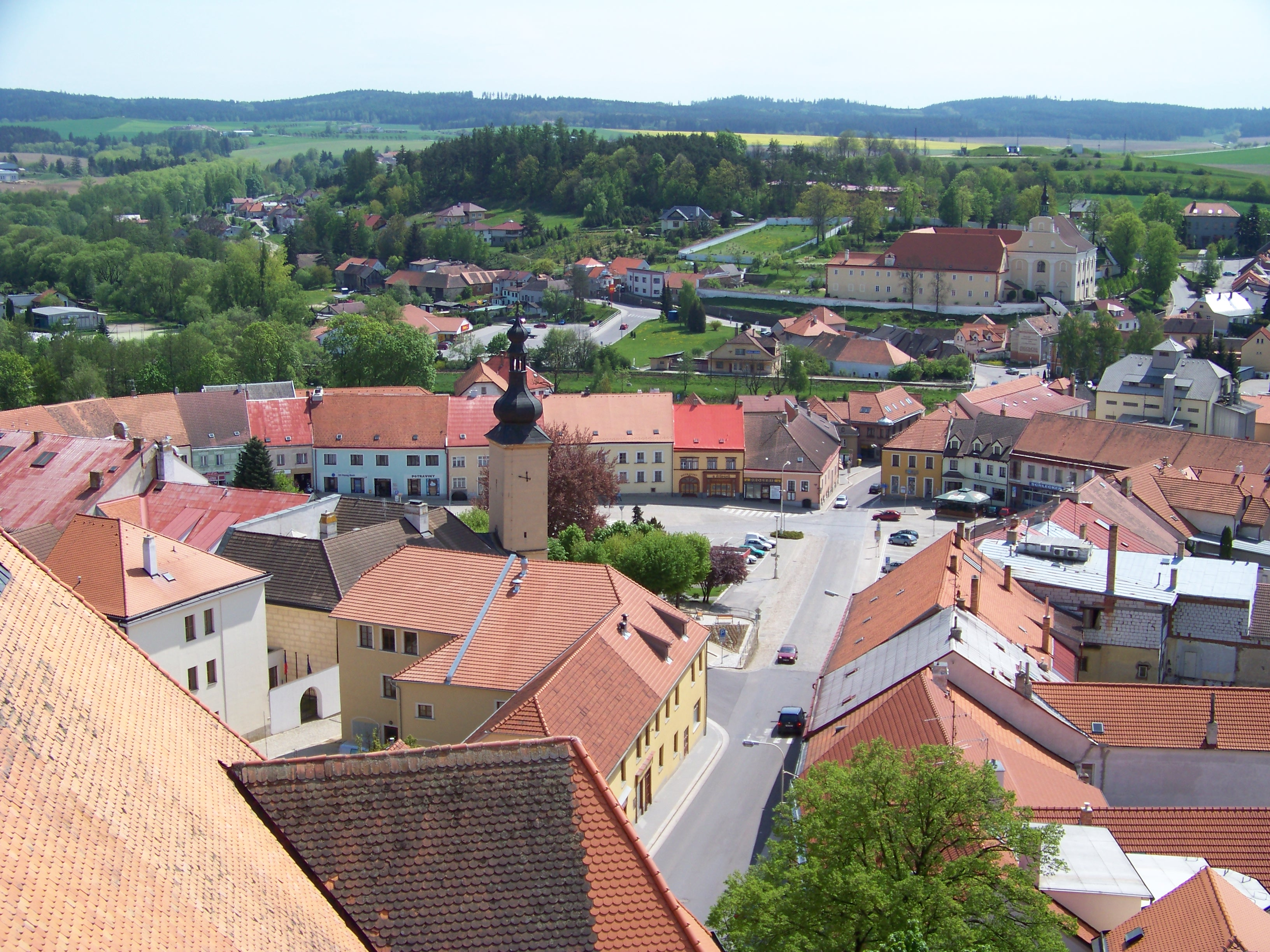
Dačice

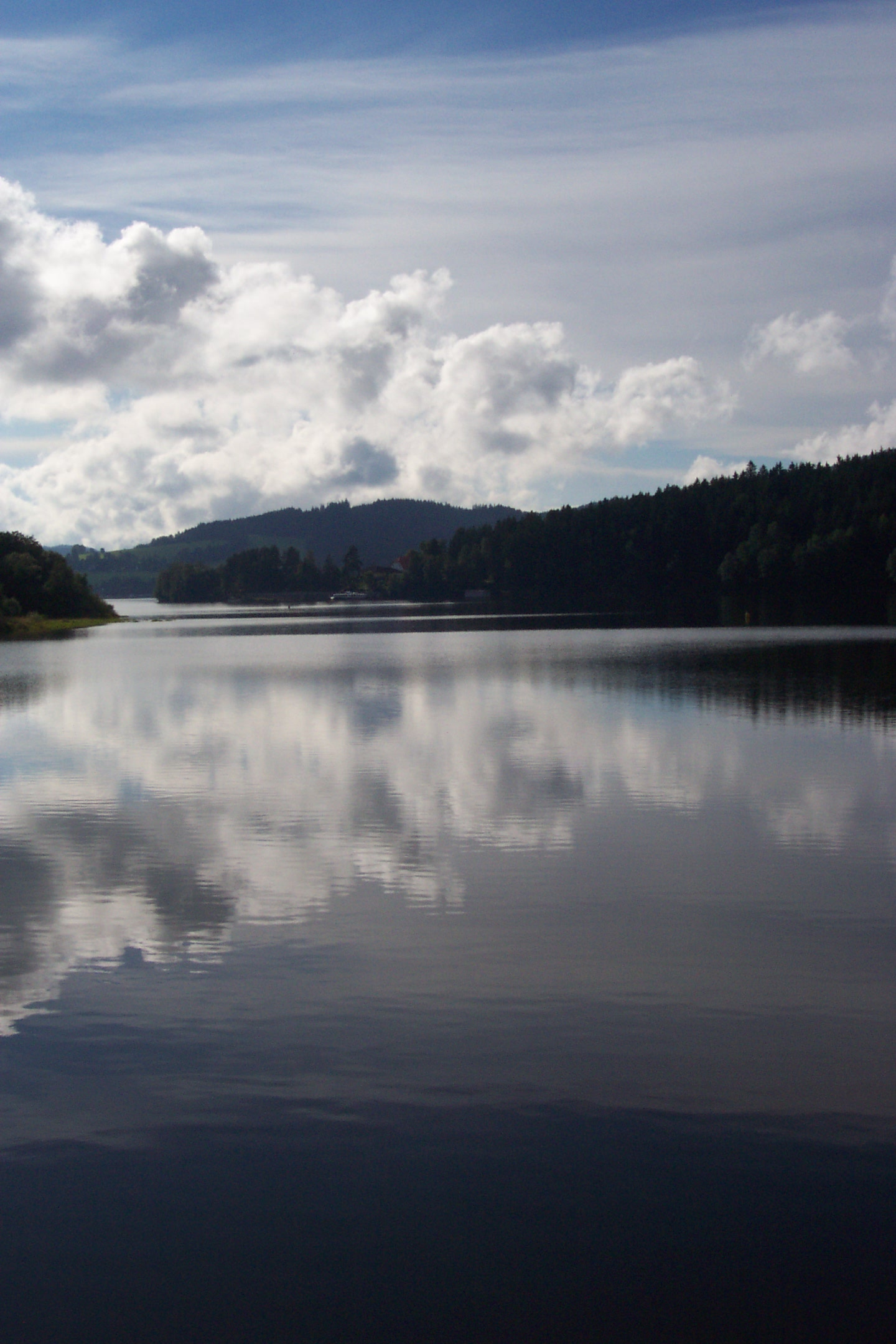
Lipno Dam

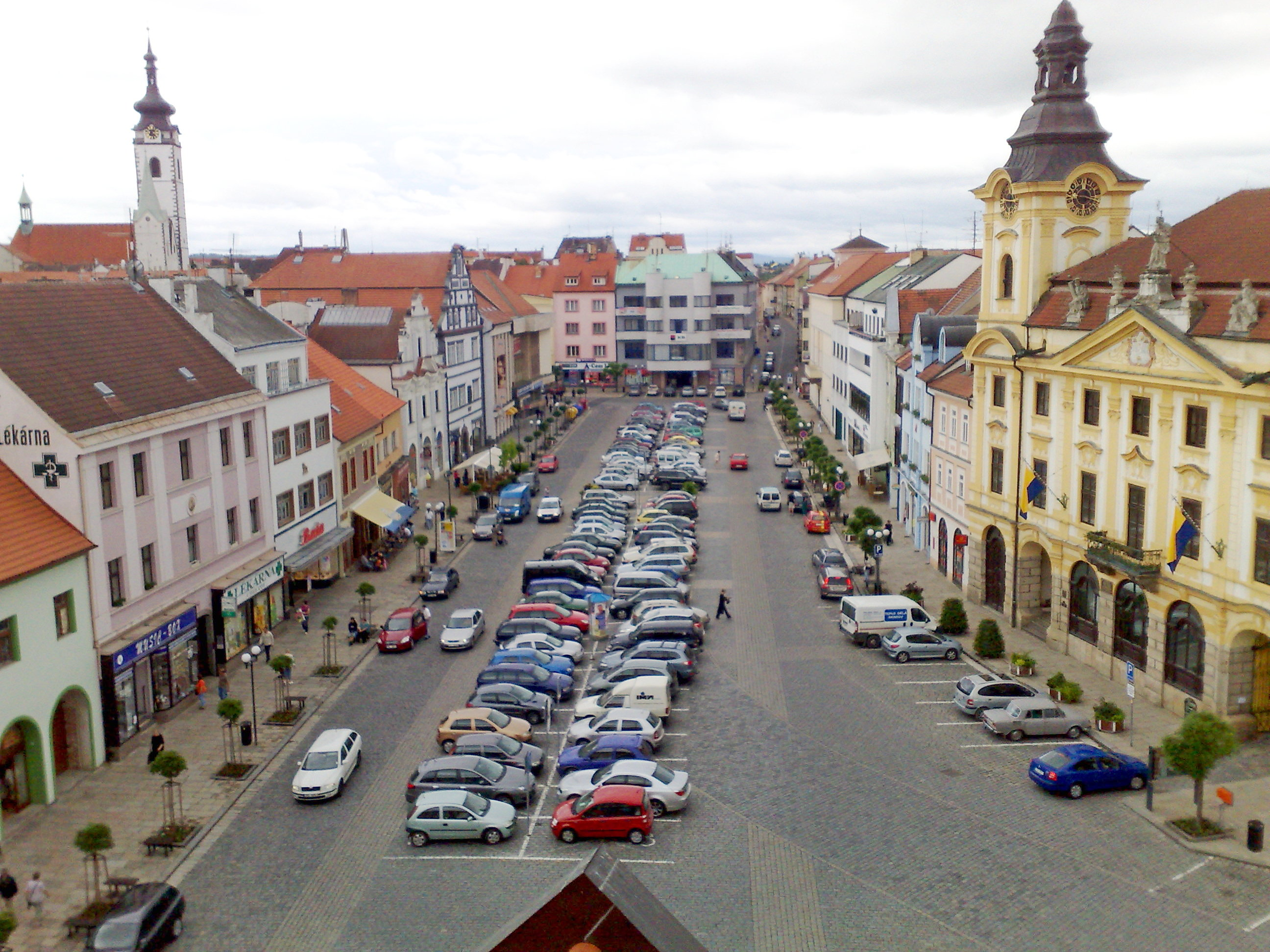
Velké Square in Písek

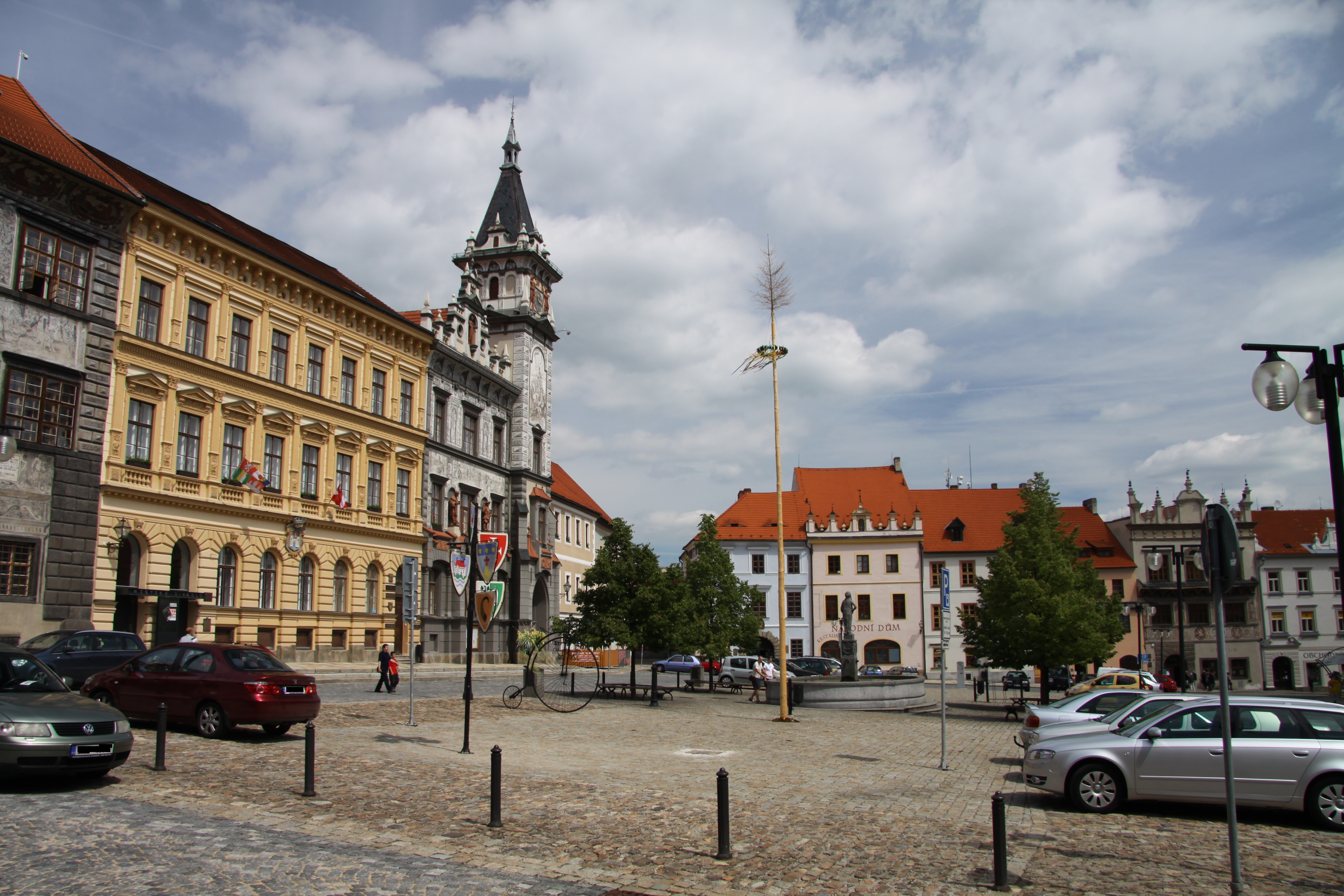
Prachatice

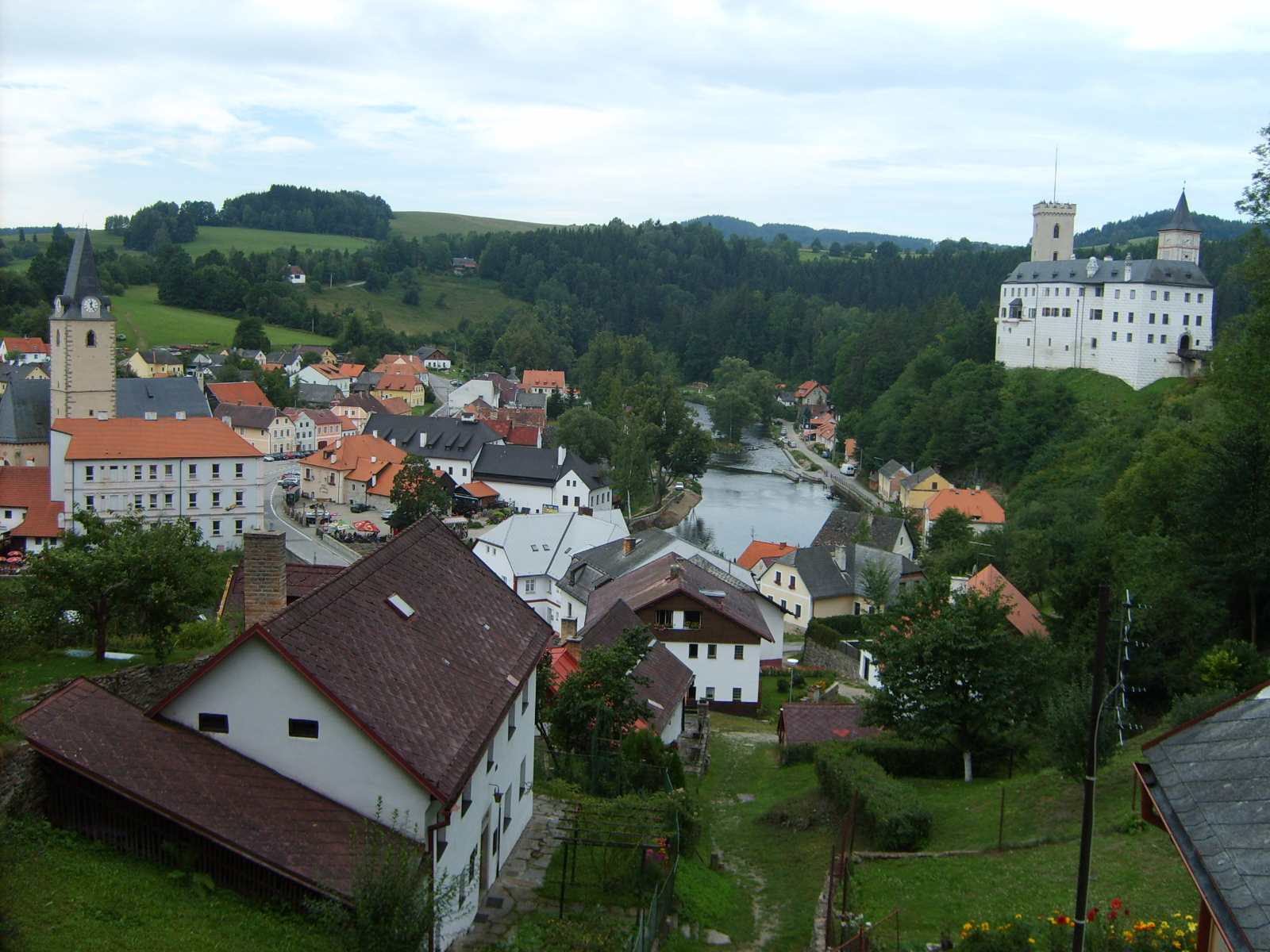
Rožmberk nad Vltavou

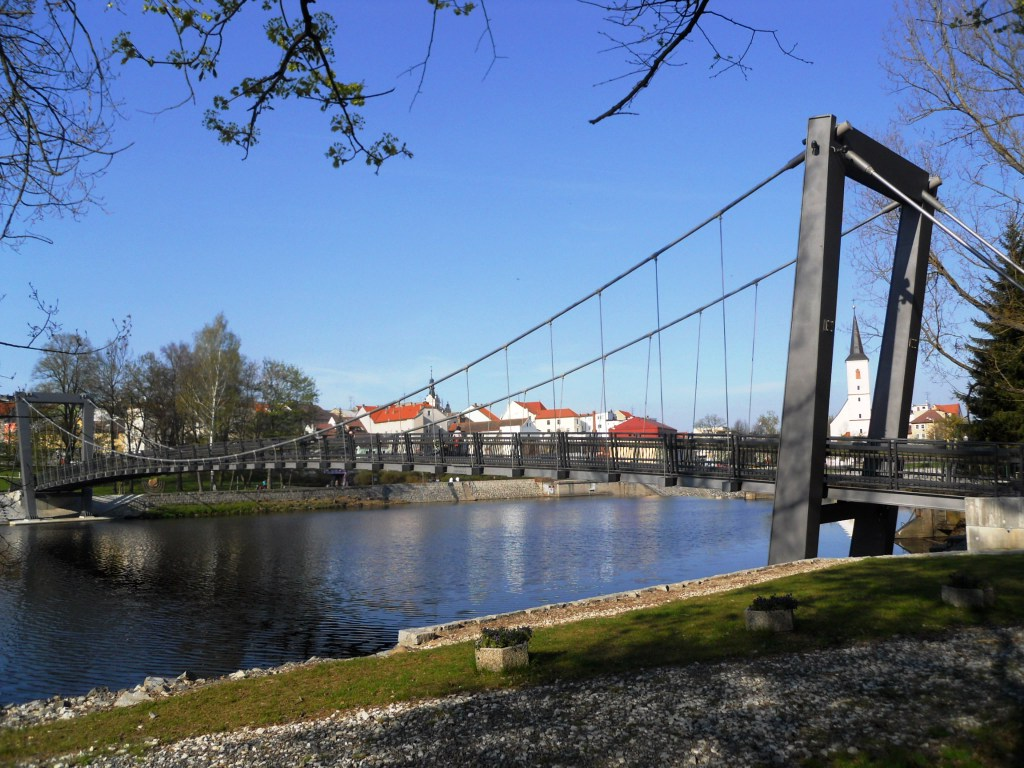
Strakonice pedestrian bridge

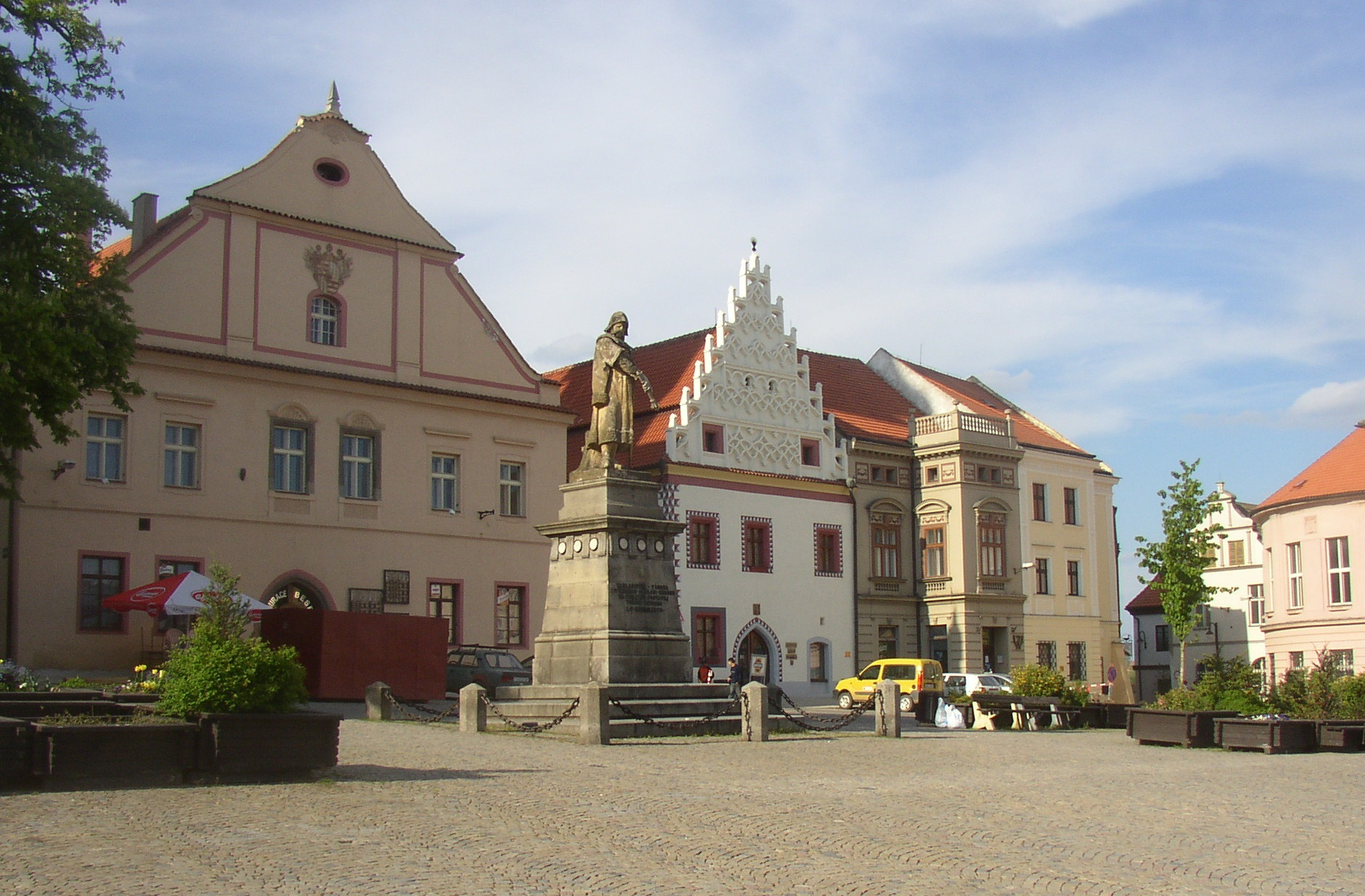
Memorial of Jan Žižka in Žižka Square in Tábor

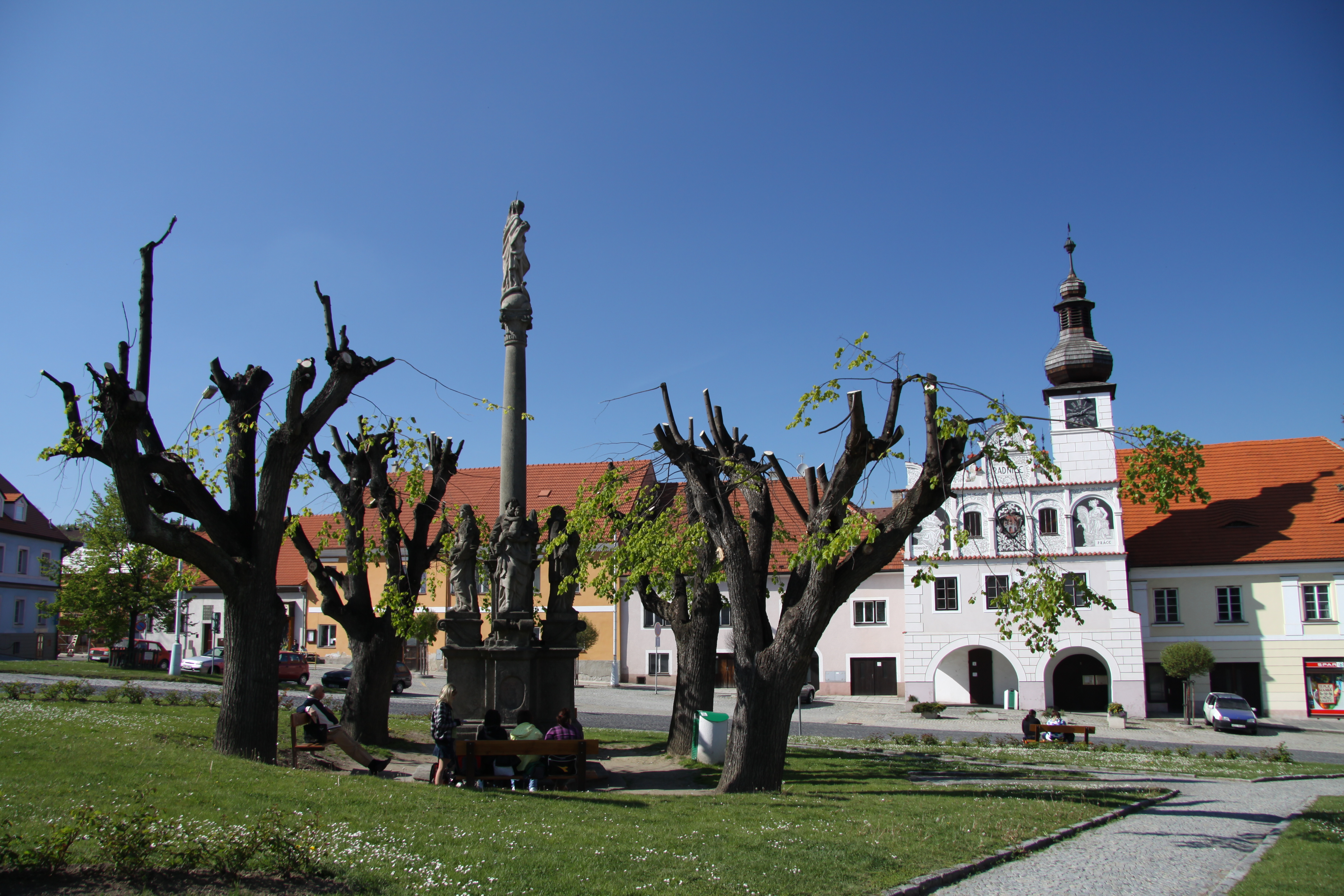
Town square in Volyně
