= Martin Kuba =

Czech politician (born 1973)

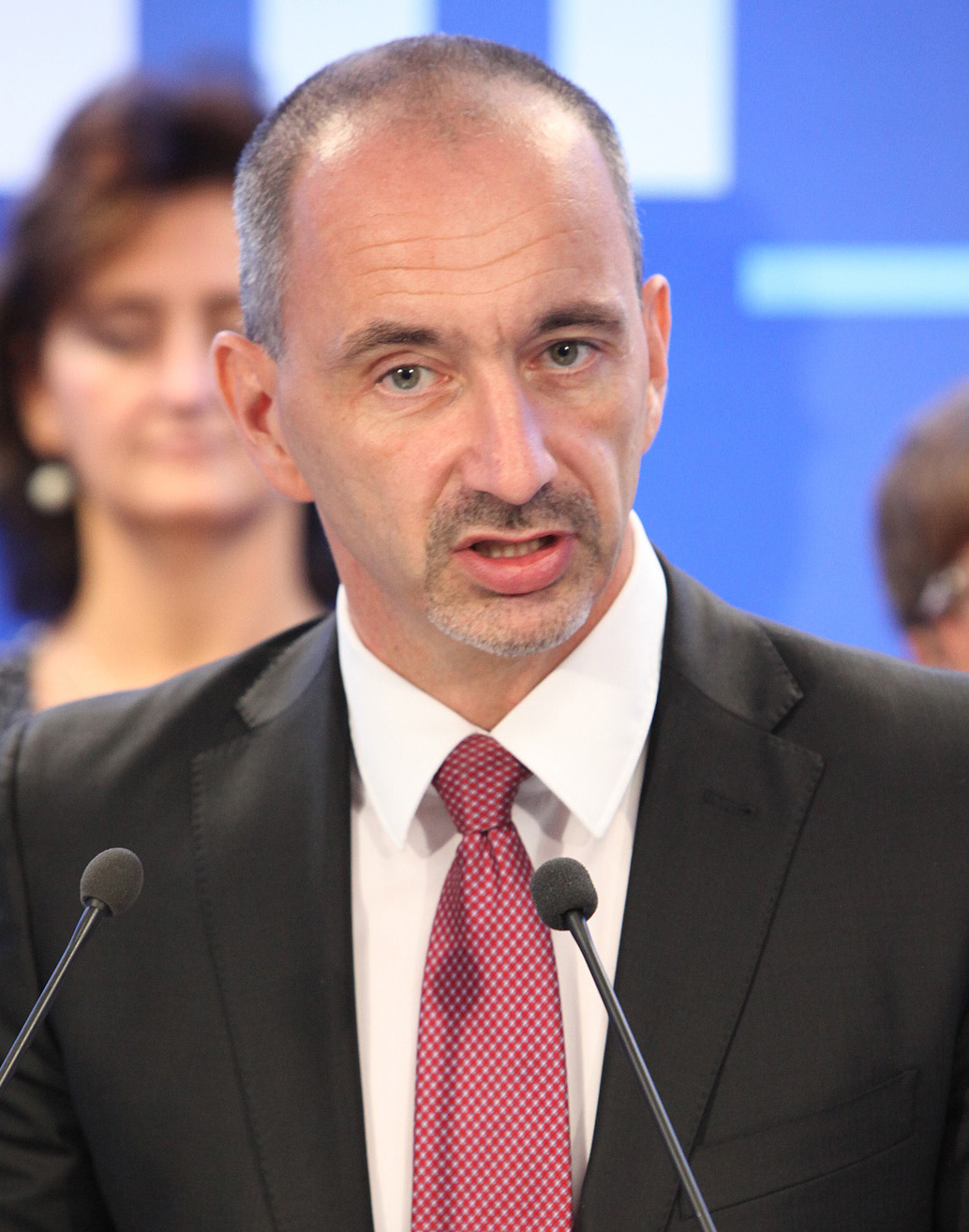

Governor of the South Bohemian Region
- Incumbent
- Assumed office 3 November 2020
- Preceded by: Ivana Stráská

Leader of the Civic Democratic Party Acting
- In office 17 June 2013 – 18 January 2014
- Preceded by: Petr Nečas
- Succeeded by: Petr Fiala

Minister of Industry and Trade
- In office 16 November 2011 – 10 July 2013
- Prime Minister: Petr Nečas
- Preceded by: Martin Kocourek
- Succeeded by: Jiří Cienciala

Personal details
- Born: 9 April 1973 (age 53) České Budějovice, Czechoslovakia (now Czech Republic)
- Party: Our Czechia (since 2026)
- Other political affiliations: ODS (2003–2025)
- Education: Charles University

Martin Kuba (born 9 April 1973) is a Czech politician who served as Minister of Industry and Trade of the Czech Republic from November 2011 to July 2013. He was appointed to Cabinet of Petr Nečas on 16 November 2011. Since November 2020 he has been the Governor of the South Bohemian Region.

== Education and profession ==
Kuba graduated from the Secondary Industrial School of Civil Engineering in České Budějovice in 1991, before deciding to become a doctor. He studied at Bílá Vločka Secondary Medical School, majoring in paramedics. He continued his studies at the First Medical Faculty of Charles University, graduated in 2002. Since then he worked as a doctor in the Emergency Medical Service and as an anesthesiologist at the Department of Cardiac Surgery. From 1996 to 1998, he worked for PSM, a pyramid scheme. In 2004 he became the operator of the Fornetti bakery in Budějovice and in 2007 he founded the Fruit Frog chain of stores.

During his tenure as Deputy Governor of the South Bohemian Region, he retained a one-fifth job at the České Budějovice Hospital, and was also a member of its Supervisory Board. In his property declaration, he listed remuneration for his membership of the board of directors of the České Budějovice heating plant, which belongs 80% to the city (together with dividends he came to 150 thousand crowns, ended here after the municipal elections). Fruit Frog cocktails. After his appointment as minister, he stated that he would transfer this small business to members of his family so that there would be no conflict of interest. After leaving the Ministry of Industry and Trade, together with Adam Kotalík, they ensured further production at Fiantex. He bought Texsr from Mr. Šrajer.

== Political career ==
=== Early career ===
He joined the Civic Democratic Party. He was elected member of České Budějovice municipal assembly in 2006. He became leader of South Bohemian Civic Democratic Party in 2008 after resignation of previous leader Tom Zajíček. Kuba received 97 od 127 votes. During 2010 party convention Kuba ran for the position of Deputy Leader of the Party. Party leader Petr Nečas stated that his victory wouldn't be good for the party. Kuba wasn't elected

Kuba ran for České Budějovice municipal assembly in 2010 on 11th place on the list. ODS won only 8 seat and Kuba thus wasn't elected. Petr Nečas publicly called party representatives who failed in the election to resign but Kuba remained in the position. Kuba became member of the municipal assembly once again on 10 March 2011 after resignation of three ambassadors elected in the election. In November 2011 Kuba was reelected leader of South Bohemian organisation.

=== Minister and Party leader ===
Kuba became a member of Cabinet of Petr Nečas on 16 November 2011, replacing Michal Doktor as Minister of Industry and Trade. Kuba then ran for the position of the Deputy leader of the Civic Democratic Party on party convention in 2012 facing Miroslava Němcová. Kuba received 363 votes against Němcová's 142 and won the position. After fall of the cabinet Petr Nečas resigned to the position of party leader and Kuba became acting leader of the Civic Democratic Party but Miroslava Němcová became electoral leader of the Civic Democratic Party in 2013 Czech parliamentary election. He ran for the Chamber of Deputies in the election but wasn't elected as the party suffered heavy losses.

Kuba decided to not defend position of Party leader and instead supported candidacy of Petr Fiala for 2014 Civic Democratic Party leadership election. Fiala won the leadership election replacing Kuba as party leader.

=== Municipal and regional politics ===
Kuba ran in 2014 municipal election for České Budějovice assembly but wasn't elected. He became a member of the South Bohemian regional assembly in the 2016 election. Kuba ran for the position of České Budějovice Mayor in 2018 municipal election in an attempt for political comeback. ODS received 8 seats in municipal assembly and remaine in opposition.

Kuba then led ODS during 2020 regional election in South Bohemia. ODS had strong performance during the election receiving 17.5% and gaining 12 seats being tied with ANO 2011. Kuba then formed coalition with KDU-ČSL, TOP 09, Czech Social Democratic Party and South Bohemians. Kuba became the new Governor. On 2 December 2020 Kuba was elected Chairman of the Regional Association.

Kuba gained widespread media attention during COVID-19 pandemic in the Czech Republic when he introduced Conception of Vaccination centres.

In 2022 municipal elections he ran for the České Budějovice assembly from the 8th place of the ODS list. Due to preferential votes, however, he finished first, thus defending his mandate as a representative. Since 2022, he has also served as a member of the city council.

Kuba led ODS during 2024 regional election in South Bohemia running for reelection for Governor. During the election campaign, he appeared on billboards without the other party candidates or the party logo. He won landslide victory as ODS received 47,5% of votes and won 34 of 55 seats in regional assembly.

On 27 November 2025, Kuba announced his departure from ODS and a plan to form a new political party. On 3 February 2026, Kuba introduced his new party called Our Czechia.
