= Our Czechia =

Our Czechia Naše Česko
- Abbreviation: NČ
- Leader: Martin Kuba
- Founder: Martin Kuba
- Founded: 3 December 2025
- Split from: Civic Democratic Party
- Headquarters: Pražská třída 2738/94; 370 04 České Budějovice
- Membership (2025): 300
- Ideology: Liberal conservatism Pro-Europeanism
- Political position: Centre-right
- Colours: White; Blue
- Chamber of Deputies: 0 / 200
- Senate: 1 / 81
- European Parliament: 0 / 21

Website
- cesko.cz

Our Czechia (Czech: Naše Česko) is a centre-right political party in the Czech Republic, founded by South Bohemian Governor Martin Kuba.

== History ==
Kuba left the Civic Democratic Party (ODS) in November 2025 after 22 years as a member. He announced his intention to form a new party, declaring that ODS could not be "fixed" anymore. Senators Zbyněk Sýkora, and Tomáš Fiala, České Budějovice Mayor Dagmar Škodová Parmová, and former South Bohemian governor Jan Zahradník also suspended their ODS membership and followed Kuba to the new movement. 30 of the 34 South Bohemian representatives elected on the ODS candidate list in the regional elections in September 2024 also expressed their intention to join the new movement. There has also been speculation that Pardubice Governor Martin Netolický, former Moravian-Silesian governor Ivo Vondrák, and former Plzeň Governor Rudolf Špoták are also ready to cooperate with the movement.

Kuba registered 'Naše Česko' as a trademark, and formally announced his party on 2 February 2026. Journalists pointed out that the name 'Naše Česko' had been used by one of the funds of the J&T Group for several years.

On 13 April 2026, Kuba announced on Facebook that the party would cooperate with Netolický's party Us in the 2026 Czech municipal elections, and intended to cooperate in the next parliamentary election. Netolický announced that the parties would also cooperate in the 2026 Czech Senate election.

== Ideology ==
Kuba said the new political entity should be centre-right and liberal-conservative, with a clear value anchor in the European Union and NATO. He said the party intended to bring a more conciliatory style of politics, and would be an option for those who understand that the state should not take care of them in everything, but that it is also necessary to help the weak.

== Election results ==
=== Senate ===
Election	First round			Second round			Seats	Total seats	+/–
Election	Votes	%	Place	Votes	%	Place	Seats	Total seats	+/–
2026	32,146	2.78	7th				1 / 27	1 / 81	New

=== Local elections ===
Election	Votes	%	Seats	+/–
2026	917,990	0.82	170 / 62,178	New
