= Edvard Kožušník =

Czech politician

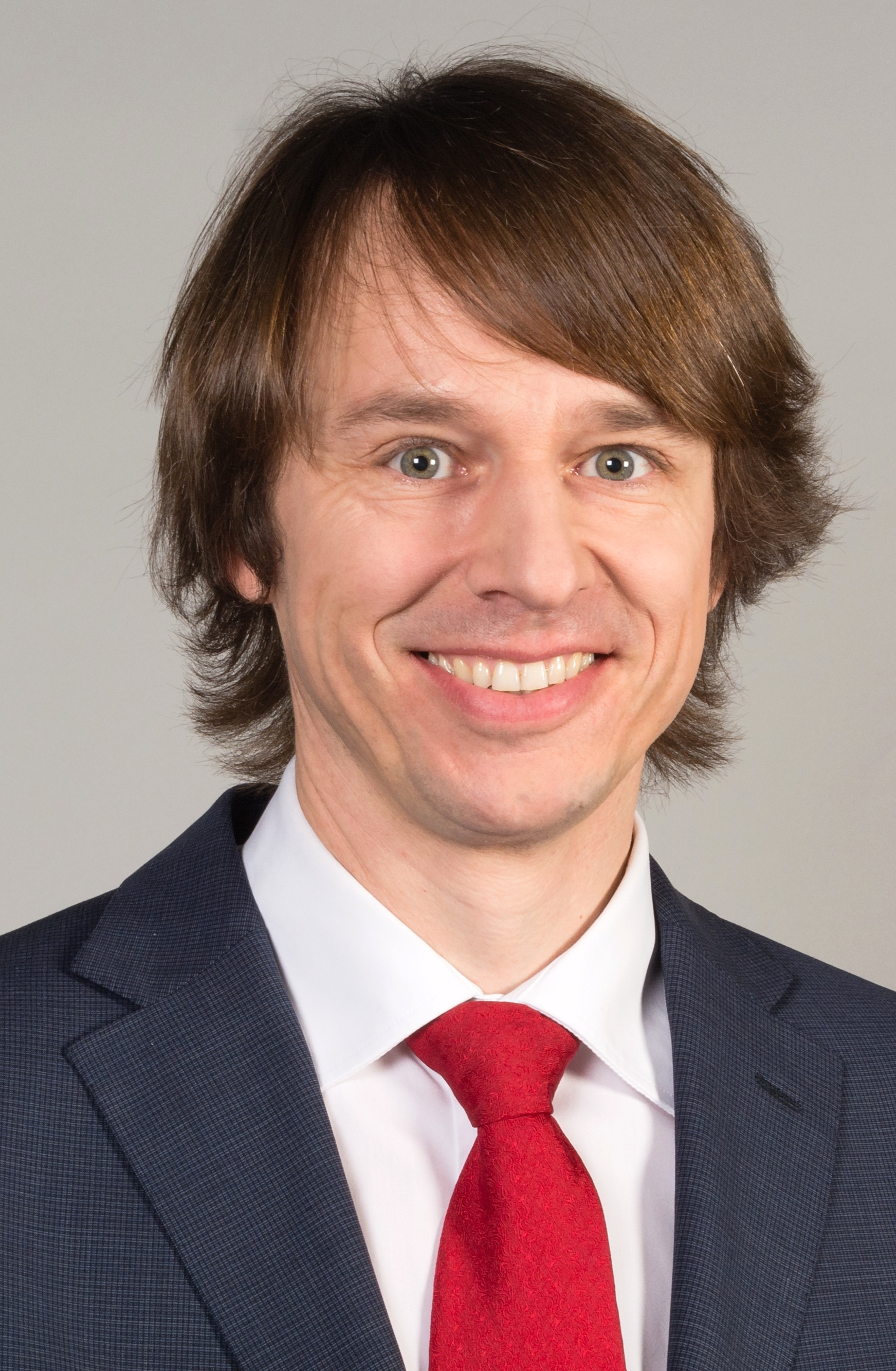

Member of the European Parliament for Czech Republic
- In office 14 July 2009 – 30 June 2014

Chief of Staff to the President of the Senate
- In office 2005–2009
- President: Přemysl Sobotka

Personal details
- Born: January 30, 1971 (age 55) Olomouc, Czechoslovakia
- Party: Civic Democratic Party

Edvard Kožušník (born 30 January 1971) is a Czech politician for the Civic Democratic Party (ODS). He served as a Member of the European Parliament from 2009 to 2014 and is the former chief of staff to the president of the Czech Senate, Přemysl Sobotka. He was an ODS candidate for European Parliament election in 2009 and received the seventh largest number of preference votes in the party. He has been the deputy minister of industry and trade of the Czech Republic since January 2022.

== Political career ==
Kožušník was one of the team responsible for launching Czech governmental think-tank eStat.cz. Subsequently, he began campaigning for the abolition of concessionary fees in the Czech Republic.

In 2014, he ran for leadership of ODS, but was defeated by Petr Fiala.

During the 2018 presidential election campaign, Kožušník joined Mirek Topolánek's team.

== Personal life ==
Kožušník's wife is Spanish and they have two children.
