= EStat.cz =

Czech think tank

eStat.cz
- Founded: 2004
- Founder: Edvard Kožušník
- Type: association
- Purpose: Austerity politics
- Location: Prague, Czech Republic
- Website: e-stat.cz (in Czech)

e-Stat.cz (formerly eStat.cz) is a think tank based in the Czech Republic, founded in 2004.

== History ==
eStat.cz was founded in 2004 by Edvard Kožušník and Michal Tošovský.

eStat.cz launched an Internet television channel in 2008. It was used by Mirek Topolánek and Pavel Bém, and some media commentators said the channel was the "own Internet television channel" of ODS. Ivo Brokeš from eStat.cz stated that politicians from other parties could also use it.

eStat.cz argued against ratification of Lisbon Treaty, saying it gave too much power to the European Commission and would lead to a "European superstate".
