= Us (political party) =

Us My
- Abbreviation: MY
- Leader: Martin Netolický
- Deputy Leader: Petr Fiala
- Founder: Petr Fiala
- Founded: 19 August 2019
- Ideology: Regionalism; Pragmatism
- Political position: Centre
- Colors: Purple
- Senate: 1 / 81
- Regional councils: 7 / 675

Website
- hnuti.my

Us (Czech: My), stylised as US (Czech: MY), is a Czech political party, founded in 2019 by Petr Fiala, mayor of Letohrad. It was originally established as a regional movement under the name of Together for the Region (Czech: Společně pro kraj; SproK). In October 2025, the governor of the Pardubice Region, Martin Netolický, joined the party following his departure from Social Democracy, expressing ambitions to transform it into a national party.

On 13 April 2026, Martin Kuba announced on Facebook that his party Our Czechia would cooperate with 'Us' in the 2026 Czech municipal elections, and intended to cooperate in the next parliamentary election. Netolický announced that the parties would also cooperate in the 2026 Czech Senate election.

== Election results ==
=== Senate ===
Election	First round			Second round			Seats	Total seats	+/–
Election	Votes	%	Place	Votes	%	Place	Seats	Total seats	+/–
2022	24,433	N/A		candidate elected in first round			1 / 27	1 / 81	New
2024	7,358	0,9	15th	did not advance			0 / 27	1 / 81	New

=== Regional councils ===
Election	Vote	Seats	+/–
2020	24 529 (Note: In coalition with ČSSD)	3 / 675	New
2024	44 776 (Note: In coalition with SOCDEM and VČ)	5 / 675	+2

=== Local elections ===
Election	Votes	%	Seats	+/–
2026	63,703	0.06	48 / 62,178	
