= Petr Fiala (senator) =

Czech senator

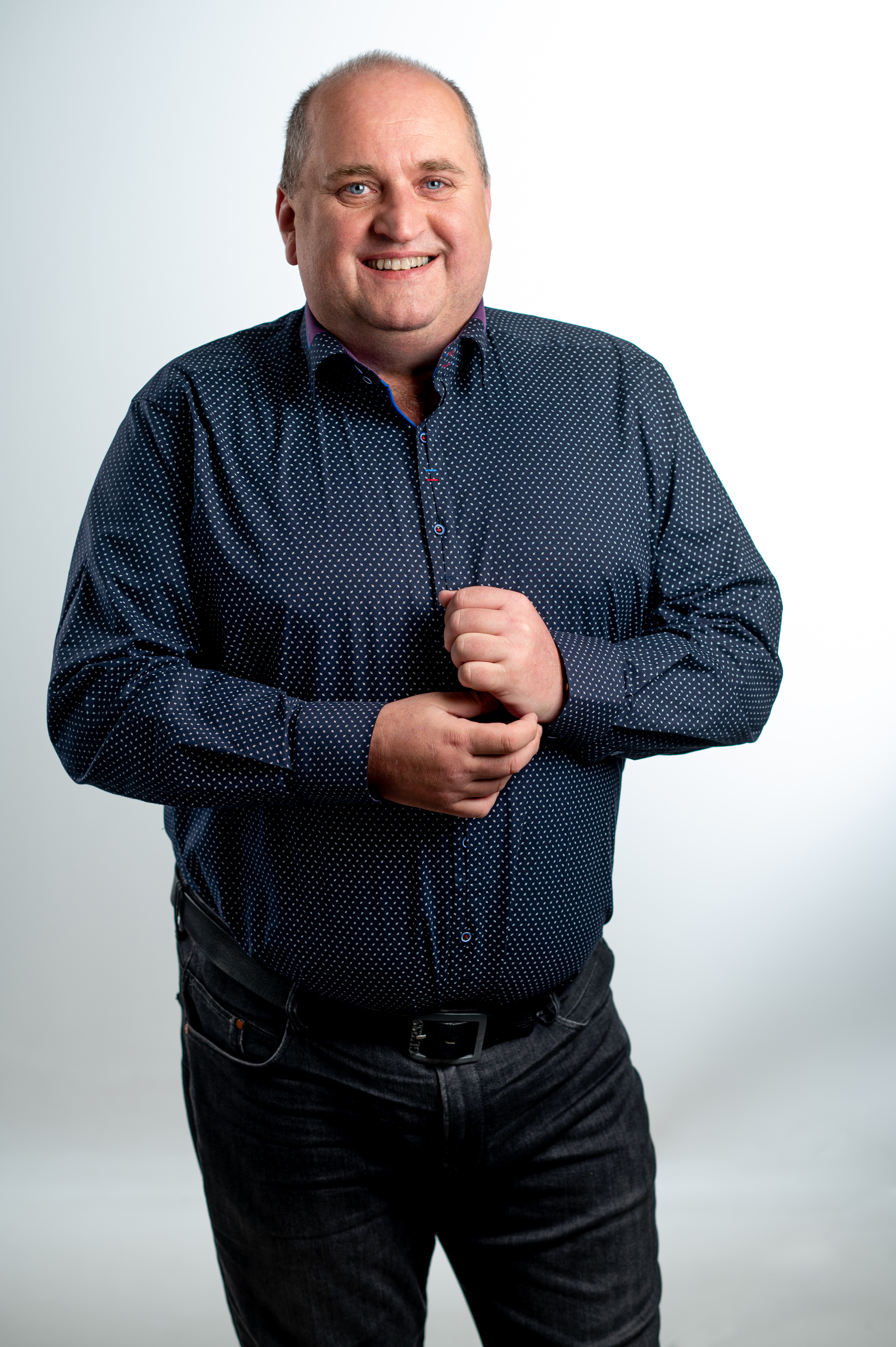

Senator for district no. 46 – Ústí nad Orlicí
- Incumbent
- Assumed office 24 September 2022
- Preceded by: Petr Šilar

Chairman of SproK/MY
- In office 29 August 2019 – 27 August 2026
- Succeeded by: Martin Netolický

Representative of the Pardubice Region
- Incumbent
- Assumed office 8 October 2016

Mayor of Letohrad
- Incumbent
- Assumed office 7 November 2006
- Preceded by: Vladimír Tomek

Personal details
- Born: 24 November 1968 (age 57) Ústí nad Orlicí, Czechoslovakia
- Party: MY

Petr Fiala (born 24 November 1968) is a Czech politician and senator who has served for district no. 46 – Ústí nad Orlicí – since 2022. He previously served as a representative of the Pardubice region from 2008 until 2012 until his return in 2016.

== Early life ==
Fiala worked as a conductor of passenger and international trains, train conductor of international Letohrad express trains, later economist at the railway station in Letohrad. Fiala served as vice-chairman of the Czech-Moravian Hockeyball Association between 1998 and 2000, after which he became held the position of its chairman until 2010.

== Political career ==
In the 2002 Czech municipal elections, Fiala failed to run as an independent candidate for the Association for Letohradsko for Letohrad City Council. He only succeeded in the 2006 elections, becoming an independent candidate and leader of Association for Letohrad group. Fiala became mayor of Ústi nad Orlicí in November 2006. He also defended the mandate of city representative and mayor in 2010, 2014, and 2018 municipal elections.

In the 2008 Czech regional elections, Fiala was also elected as a representative of the Pardubice region for the first time, when he ran as an independent on the ČSSD candidate list – serving as vice-chairman of the Finance Committee. Fiala was elected as a non-party member of the ČSSD in the 2016 Czech regional elections. During the 2016–2020 election period, he served as chairman of the committee for transport and transport services of the Pardubice region.

In August 2019, Fiala co-founded the Společně pro kraj (SproK; named MY since 2025) movement and became its chairman. In the 2020 Czech regional elections, he defended his mandate as a representative of the Pardubice region. During this period, Fiala served as chairman of the committee for transport and transport services of the Pardubice region. He also served as chairman of the Orlicko Association of Municipalities.
