= 2020 Czech regional elections =

Regional council election in the Czech Republic

← 2016	2–3 October 2020	2024 →

All 675 seats in the regional councils
- Turnout: 38.0%
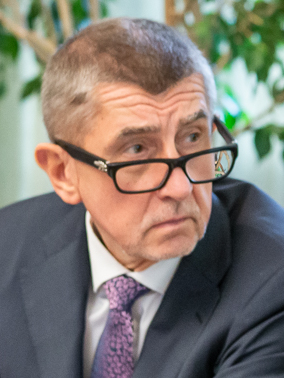

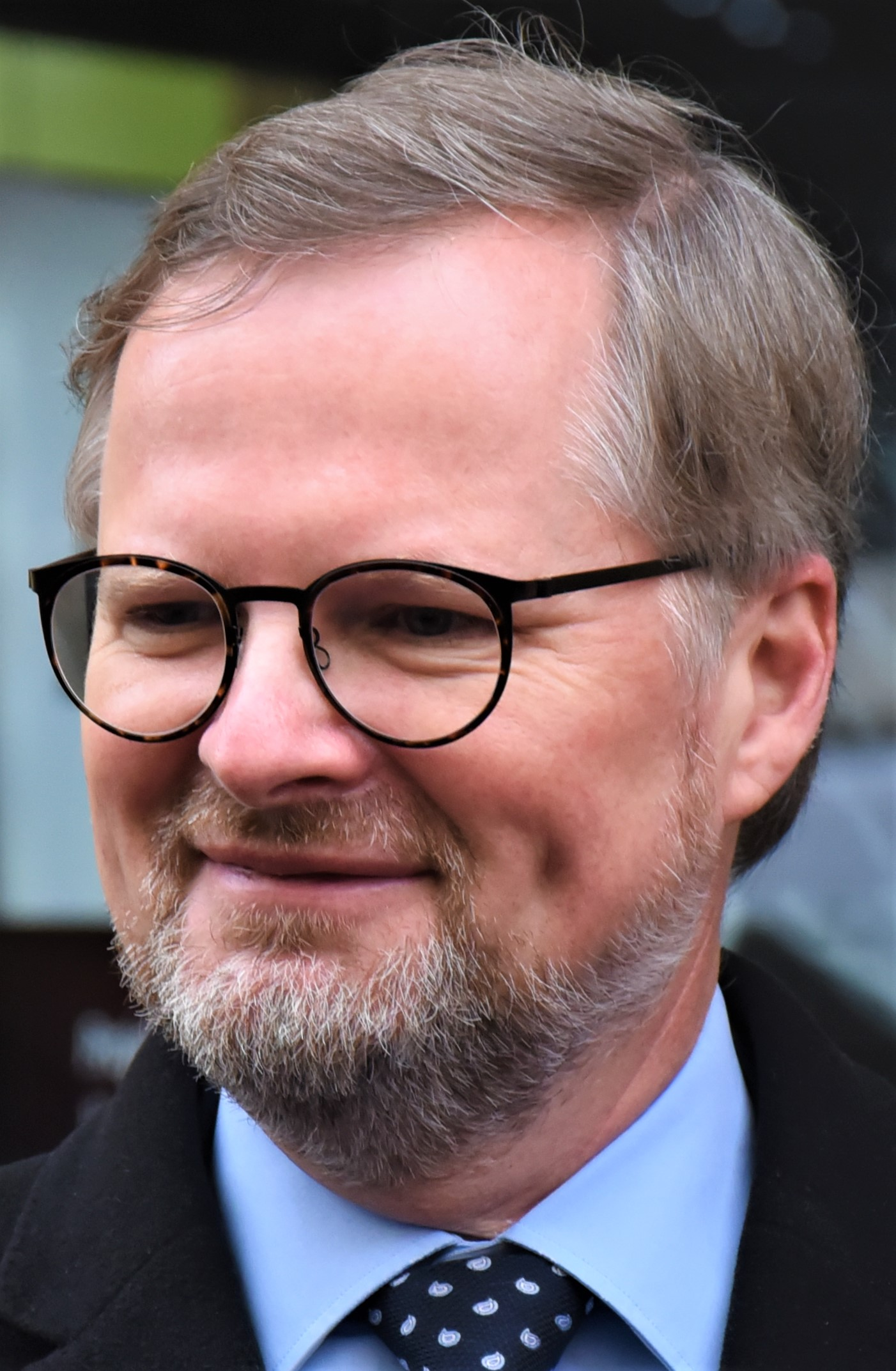

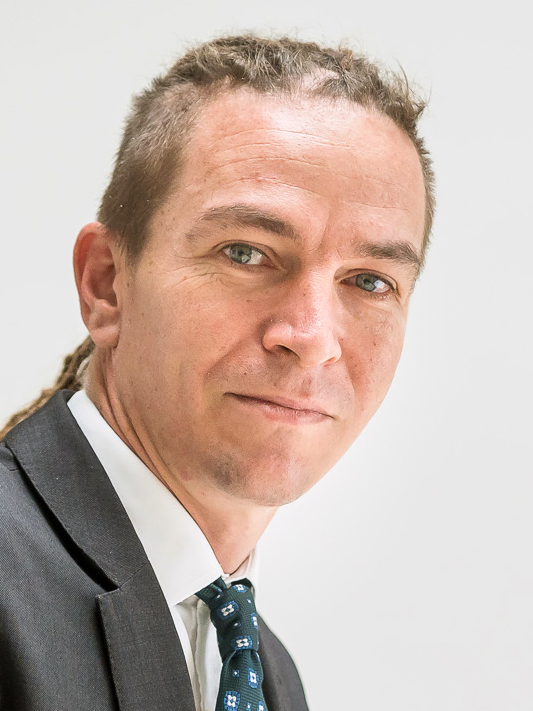

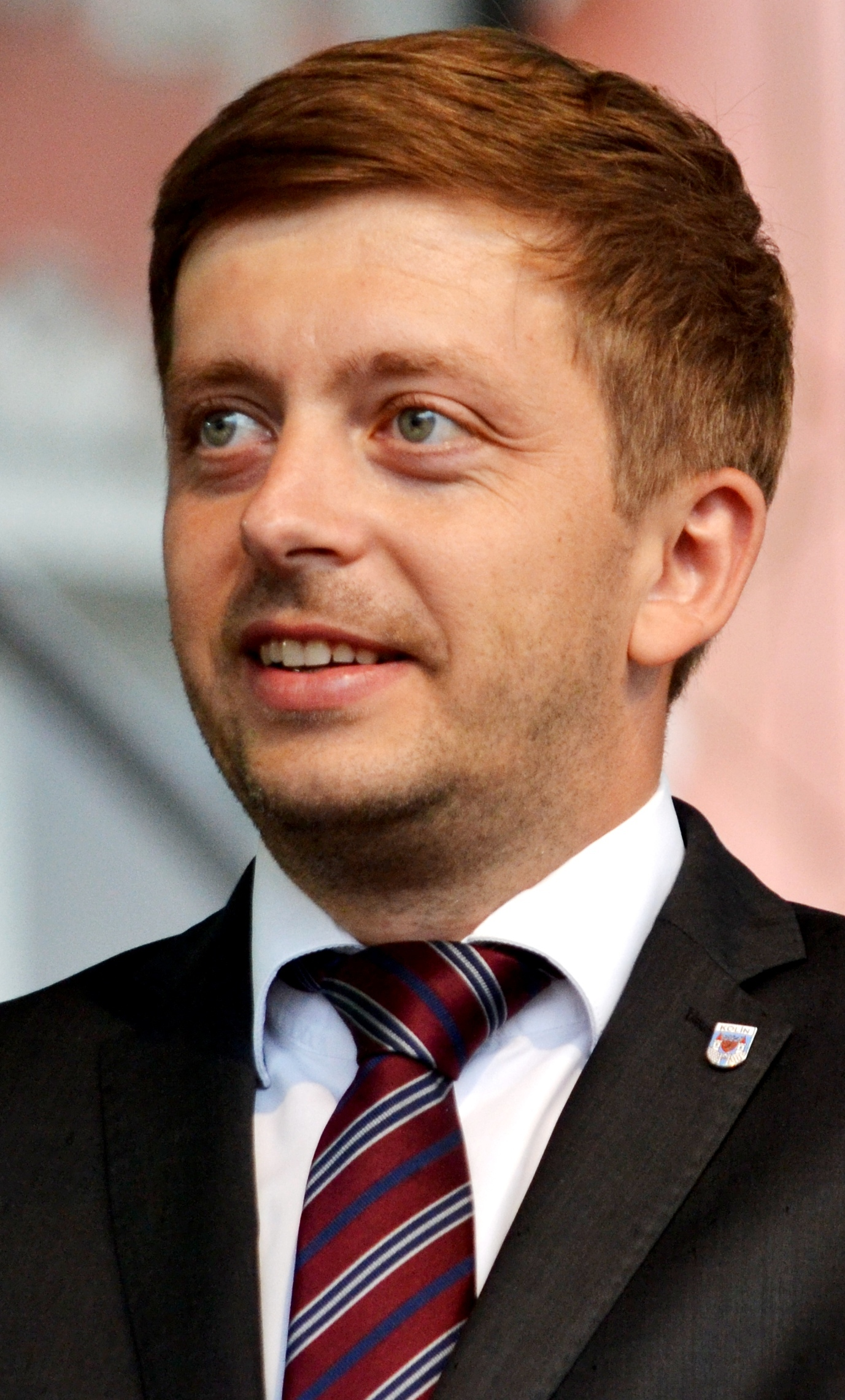

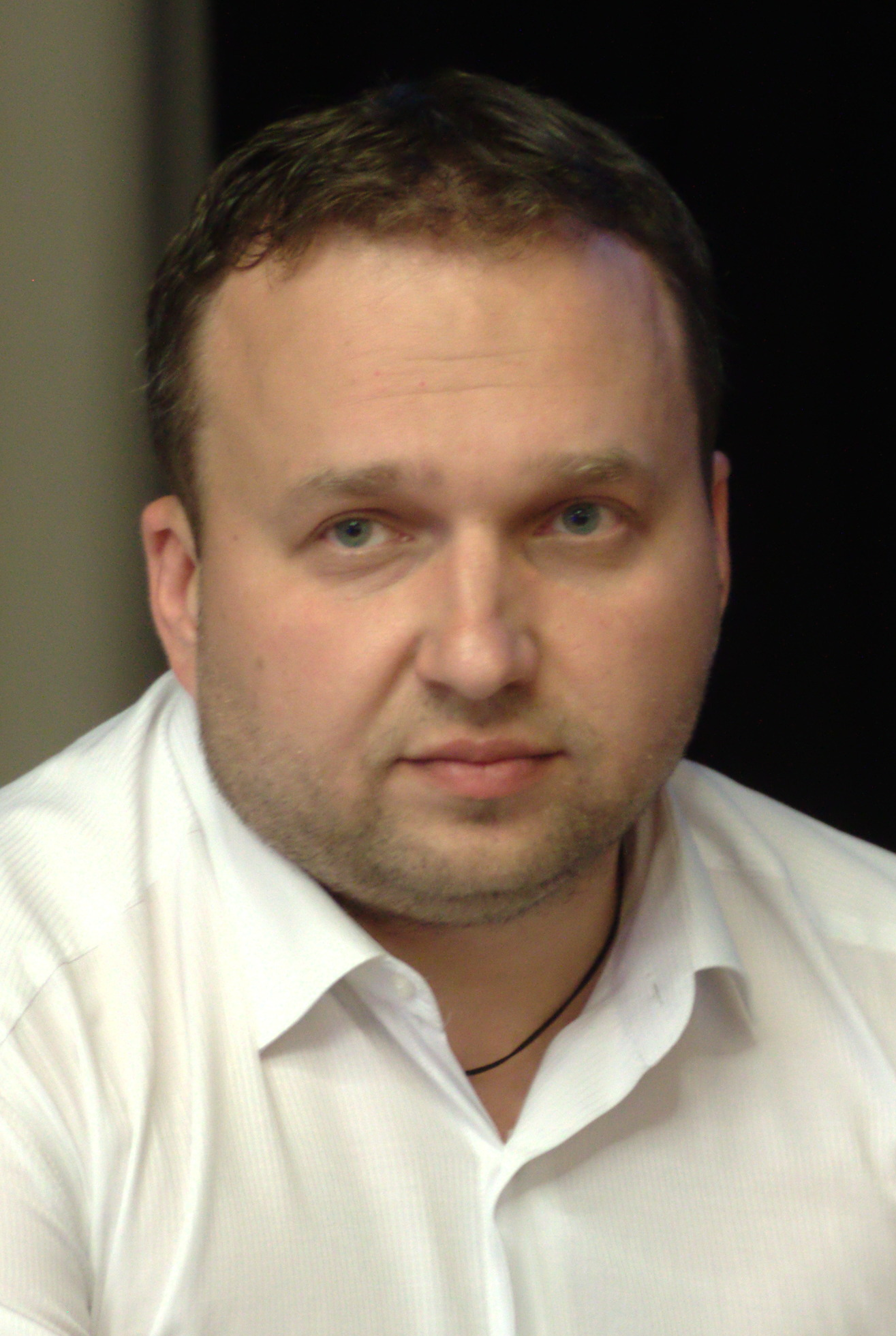

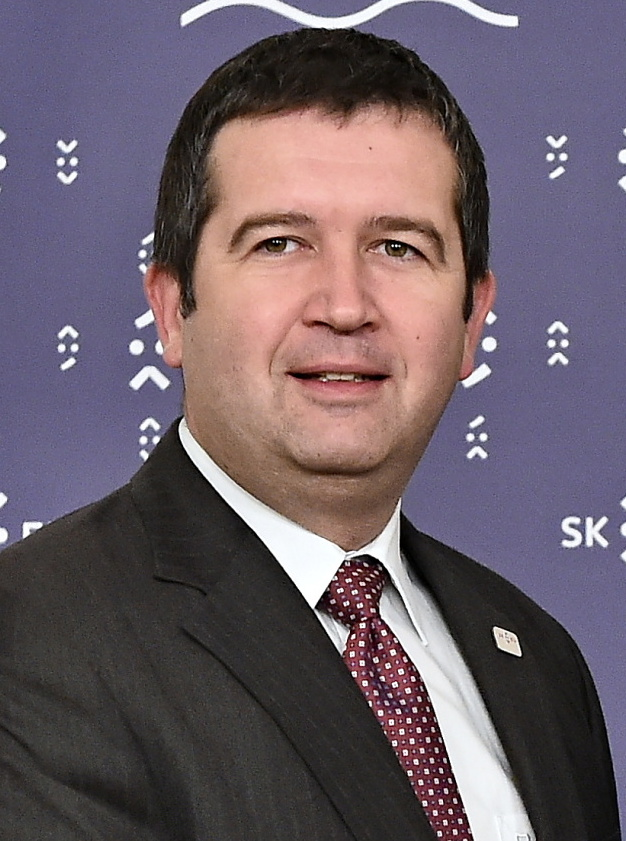
	First party	Second party	Third party
Leader	Andrej Babiš	Petr Fiala	Ivan Bartoš
Party	ANO	ODS	Pirates
Last election	176 seats	76 seats	5 seats
Seats won	178	99	99
Seat change	▲2	▲23	▲94
Popular vote	604,441	411,825	369,702
Percentage	21.82%	14.87%	13.33%
Governors	3	4	0
	Fourth party	Fifth party	Sixth party
Leader	Vít Rakušan	Marian Jurečka	Jan Hamáček
Party	STAN	KDU-ČSL	ČSSD
Last election	38 seats	61 seats	125 seats
Seats won	91	53	37
Seat change	▲35	▼8	▼88
Popular vote	405,477	252,598	185,714
Percentage	14.64%	9.12%	6.68%
Governors	4	1	1
Chairman of the Regional Association before election
Jiří Běhounek (acting)
ČSSD
Elected Chairman of the Regional Association
Martin Kuba
ODS

Elections to regional councils in the Czech Republic in 13 regions (except Prague) were held on 2–3 October 2020.

== Background ==
ANO 2011 won the previous election. Czech Social Democratic Party saw heavy losses and came second. 2017 Czech legislative election resulted in another victory of ANO 2011 while Social Democrats were reduced to 6th place. Traditional main right wing party Civic Democratic Party finished second followed by Czech Pirate Party and Freedom and Direct Democracy. Civic Democrats and Pirates has since then competed for the position of the main opposition party.

TOP 09 and Mayors and Independents negotiated about possible electoral alliance, but in December 2019, negotiations failed and parties decided to cooperate only in some regions. In February 2020 the Civic Democratic Party and TOP 09 in Plzeň region agreed to cooperate in Plzeň region allowing TOP 09 candidates to run on the Civic Democratic Party list. Similar agreements were made in Pardubice Region and Moravian-Silesian Region in which ODS allowed TOP 09 to run on its list. ODS also formed an electoral alliance with KDU-ČSL in Karlovy Vary Region and with STAN and Eastern Bohemians in Hradec Králové Region.

Czech Pirate Party formed an electoral alliance with Mayors an Independents for Olomouc region in March 2020. The Pirate Party decided to not form any other regional electoral alliance.

Tricolour Citizens' Movement formed coalitions with Svobodní and Freeholder Party of the Czech Republic in most regions. It is the first election for the Party that formed in 2019.

Election lists were to be submitted no later than on 28 July 2020. 207 lists were submitted with largest portion in Moravian-Silesian Region and South Bohemian Region.

=== COVID-19 pandemic ===
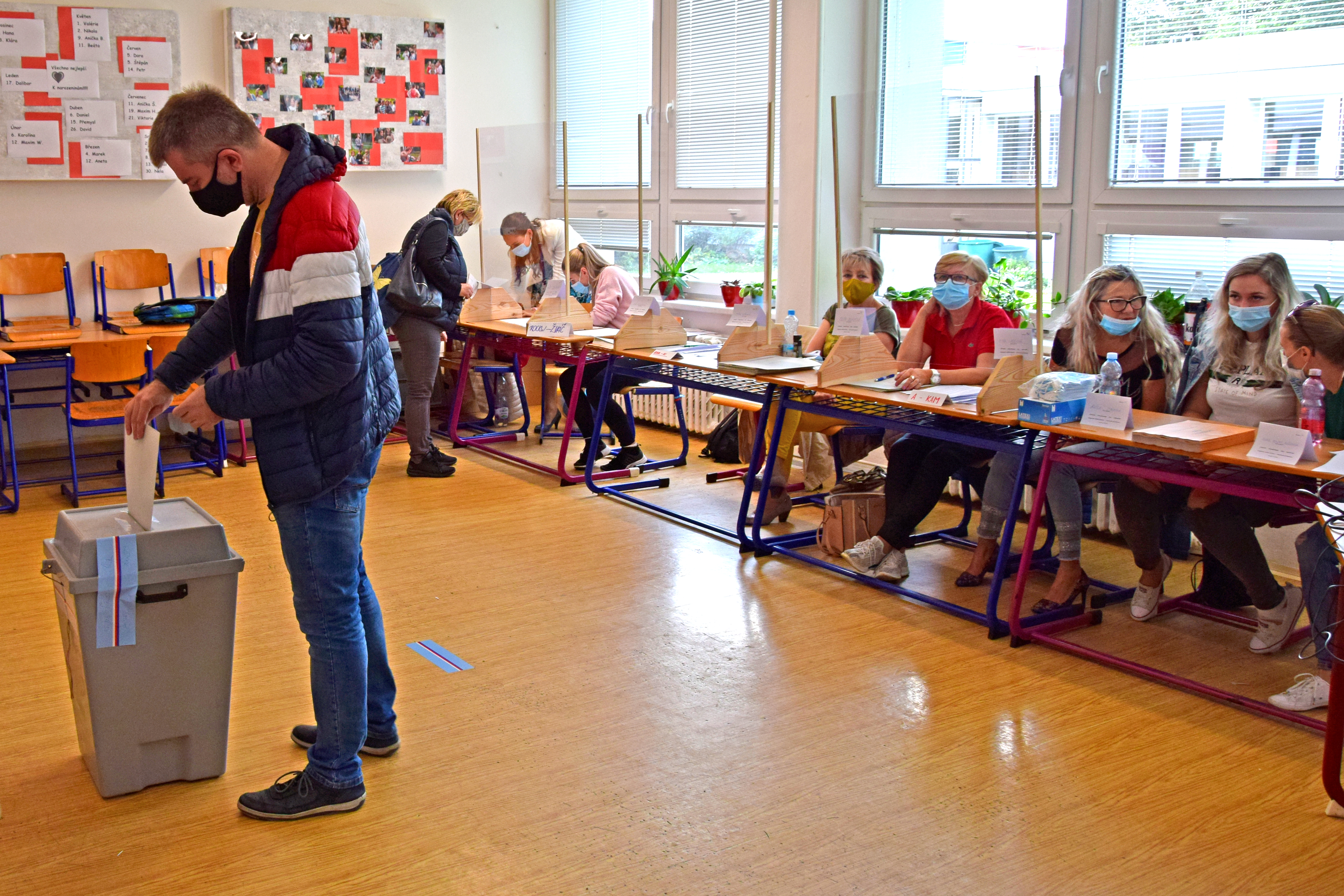
2020 Czech regional elections in Olomouc

Election would be held during COVID-19 pandemic. In July 2020 it was reported that people in quarantine would be unable to vote. Opposition parties largely criticised that people would be limited on their right to vote. This led government to prepare laws to enable quarantined people to vote. It introduced 4 possibilities - drive-through voting, voting through a representative, or a special electoral commission that would come to affected people and formation of special electoral districts. Minister of Interior and leader of ČSSD stated that Parliament should accept all possibilities. TOP 09, STAN and Pirates only decided to support Drive-through voting and special electoral districts. ODS decided to support Drive-through voting, special electoral commissions but opposed the possibility of voting through a representative.

== Campaign ==
=== ANO 2011 ===
The party is running alone in all regions. The party decided to put many MPs on its lists. ANO is viewed as the front-runner. It has 5 Governors and the highest number of seats in regional councils. According to a poll conducted for ANO 2011, the party would win in most regions with the Central Bohemian and Liberec regions as the only regions in which ANO wouldn't win.

The party launched its Campaign on 3 September 2020 with the slogans "Shown applies" and "Actions instead of Words." Party hopes that the voters will appreciate its previous work.

=== Civic Democratic Party (ODS) ===
Martin Kupka became electoral manager of ODS for regional elections. He is also running for the position of the Governor of the Central Bohemian District. Other Governor Candidates include Martin Červíček former Police President, Martin Kuba and Jiří Nantl. ODS is running with other smaller parties in some regions. Kupka admitted that the Campaign of ODS is influenced by the 2020 coronavirus outbreak in the Czech Republic as restrictions delayed launch of the Campaign and cause it to be focused more on Social media.

ODS launched its campaign on 24 June 2020 with the slogan "Let's put Czechia back on its feet."

=== Czech Pirate Party (Piráti) ===
The Czech Pirate Party launched their campaign on 22 June 2020. It runs under the slogan "Chance to change the Future." The party is running without cooperation with other Parties. Only in Olomouc region are the Pirates running in a coalition with Mayors and Independents.

=== Czech Social Democratic Party (ČSSD) ===
Michal Hašek became the electoral manager of ČSSD on 23 April 2020. He was chosen by the leader of the Party Jan Hamáček. Party holds Governor seats in 5 of 12 regions. Ivana Stráská, Jiří Běhounek, Martin Netolický and Jiří Štěpán seek reelection while Josef Bernard decided to not run for another term as a Candidate of ČSSD and instead runs as a Candidate of STAN. The Party decided to form electoral coalitions in regions to mitigate expected losses. According to a poll conducted by ČSSD the party would fail to cross the 5% threshold in 10 of 13 regions. ČSSD formed electoral alliances in Pardubice, Hradec Králové, Moravian-Silesian and Ústí nad Labem regions. The party also has to face challenges from parties that split from the party including Change 2020 led by Jiří Zimola in South Bohemia, Idealists.cz in South Moravia and other regions.

ČSSD launched its campaign on 26 June 2020. The campaign was launched via digital streaming due to 2020 coronavirus outbreak. The campaign uses slogan "People First, campaign later."

On 4 July 2020 the social democratic leadership rejected an electoral alliance with smaller parties in Ústí nad Labem region called Better North. Leaders of regional organisation stated, that despite the decision of the party's leadership they plan to continue with the project. They stated that the party leadership didn't tell reasons for the decision. This led to a split when party leadership decided to submit its own list in Ústí nad Labem region without consulting Ústí nad Labem branch of the ČSSD. Candidates on the list included former MP Jaroslav Krákora or controversial politician Petr Benda who previously ran as a candidate of National Socialists - Left of the 21st century and Workers' Party of Social Justice (DSSS). This list is supported by the For Sport movement. Leader of Ústí nad Labem regional organisation Miroslav Andrt stated that it was an unimaginable leadership in Prague that ignored democratic principles in the party. Regional organisation decided to submit its list Better North to run against ČSSD in the region and ČSSD members on the list suspended their membership in the party. Nomination of Petr Benda was largely criticised due to his previous affiliation with Neo-Nazi DSSS.

=== Freedom and Direct Democracy (SPD) ===
Freedom and Direct Democracy aims to win 50 seats and participate in governing of at least 2 regions. Election motto is "Honest and working people first and must get more money, safety and justice." Campaign was launched on 11 July 2020.

=== Mayors and Independents (STAN) ===
STAN launched its campaign on 31 August 2020 using garlic as a representation of its campaign, noting that garlic has a healing ability. Party leader Vít Rakušan stated, that he believes that Regions need to regenerate.

=== TOP 09 ===
TOP 09 campaign uses the slogan "Let's move with it." The party decided to form electoral coalitions with other parties in every region.

=== Tricolour Citizens' Movement (THO) ===
Tricolour Citizens' Movement runs for its first major election. The party formed coalitions with Freeholder Party of the Czech Republic, Svobodní and INDEPENDENTS. Leaders of the party plan to ride through the country in a van to campaign for the party.

== Opinion polls ==
Date	Polling Firm	ANO	ČSSD	KSČM	ODS	KDU-ČSL	STAN	PIRÁTI	SPD	TOP 09	Tricolour	Note
31 August 2020	Phoenix Research	32.2	9.1	6.2	15.1	6.6	6.2	16.1	11.8	4.0	1.2	Election potential

=== Kantar Polls for Czech Television ===
Note: Election potential

Date	Region	ANO	ČSSD	KSČM	ODS (with support of Soukromníci, KČ, KANS, KON)	STAN (with support of KDU-ČSL, SNK ED)	Piráti	SPD	Spojenci pro kraj (Coalition of TOP 09, Hlas, Zelení)	Tricolour	Demokratická strana zelených
6 September 2020	Central Bohemian Region	29.5	11	6.5	15	14.5	19	7	9.5	6.2	5.9
Date	Region	ANO	ČSSD	KSČM	ODS + KDU-ČSL (with support of Soukromníci)	STAN + TOP 09 + KOA + VPM Cheb	Piráti	SPD	VOK (with support of Karlovaráci)	Zdraví Sport Prosperita	SNK1
6 September 2020	Karlovy Vary Region	32.5	7	7.5	9.5	11	15.5	10.5	8.5	8	6
Date	Region	ANO	ČSSD	KSČM	ODS (with support of TOP 09)	STAN (with support of Zelení, Pro Plzeň)	Piráti	SPD	KDU-ČSL + Independents	Demokratická strana zelených	
6 September 2020	Plzeň Region	32	8	5	21	11	19.5	7.5	7	6	
Date	Region	ANO	ČSSD	KSČM	ODS	STAN	Piráti	SPD	TOP 09 + KDU-ČSL	Jihočeši	
6 September 2020	South Bohemian Region	30	11	-	16.5	15	17	6.5	12.5	7.5	
Date	Region	ANO	ČSSD	KSČM	ODS	STAN (with support of Soukromníci, USZ, VÚ)	Piráti	SPD	Spojenci pro kraj (Coalition of TOP 09, JsmePRO!, Zelení, SNK ED, LES)	Severočeši.cz	Demokratická strana zelených
6 September 2020	Ústí nad Labem Region	37.5	8.5	8.5	6.5	10.5	16	9	7	8.5	6
Date	Region	ANO	ČSSD + SproK	KSČM	ODS + TOP 09	STAN	Piráti	SPD	Koalice pro Pardubický kraj (Coalition of KDU-ČSL, SNK ED, Independents)	Zelení	Demokratická strana zelených
6 September 2020	Pardubice Region	30	10.5	6	14.5	14	18.5	7	13	6	5
Date	Region	ANO	ČSSD	KSČM	ODS	STAN	Piráti	SPD	Společně pro Liberecký kraj (Coalition of KDU-ČSL, TOP 09ú	Pro KRAJinu (Coalition of Zelení, LES)	Demokratická strana zelených
6 September 2020	Liberec Region	29	8	-	16.5	22	16.5	7	8	5	5
Date	Region	ANO	ČSSD + Zelení + Independents	KSČM	ODS + STAN + Východočeši	TOP 09 + HDK + LES	Piráti	SPD	Koalice pro Královéhradecký kraj (Coalition of KDU-ČSL, VPM)	Tricolour (with support of Soukromníci, Svobodní)	Demokratická strana zelených
6 September 2020	Hradec Králové Region	31	10	-	21.5	8.5	21	6	12	7	5.5
Date	Region	ANO	ČSSD	KSČM	ODS (with support of Svobodní, SOpM)	STAN	Piráti	SPD	KDU-ČSL	Spolu pro Moravu (Coalition of TOP 09, Zelení, MZH, Idealisté, LES)	Moravané
6 September 2020	South Moravian Region	30	10	5.5		8.5	18.5	7	12.5	9	6.5
Date	Region	ANO	ČSSD	KSČM	ODS (with support of TOP 09)	STAN + Zelení + Independents	Piráti	SPD	KDU-ČSL	Starostové pro kraj	Tricolour
6 September 2020	Moravian-Silesian Region	40.5	11	6	12	9.5	16	10	6	8	5
Date	Region	ANO	ČSSD	KSČM	ODS + Starostové pro občany (with support of Svobodní)	STAN + SNK ED (with support of Pro Třebíč)	Piráti	SPD	KDU-ČSL	Pro TOP Vysočinu (Coalition of TOP 09, KAN, KČ)	
6 September 2020	Vysočina Region	30	12	6.5	15.5	13.5	16.5	8	11.5	6.5	
Date	Region	ANO	ČSSD (with support of Zelení)	KSČM	ODS	STAN (with support of TOP 09, Nový Impuls, ZHN)	Piráti	SPD	KDU-ČSL	Tricolour + Soukromníci + Independents	Moravané
6 September 2020	Zlín Region	30.5	8.5	7.5	16	13.5	15.5	9.5	17.5	6	5.5
Date	Region	ANO	ČSSD + Patrioti Olomouckého kraje	KSČM	ODS	STAN + Piráti	SPD	Spojenci (Coalition of KDU-ČSL, TOP 09, Zelení, ProOlomouc)	Tricolour	Moravané	Demokratická strana zelených
6 September 2020	Olomouc Region	35.5	9.5	7.5	15	15	10.5	16	6	5.5	5

== Results ==
=== Total results ===
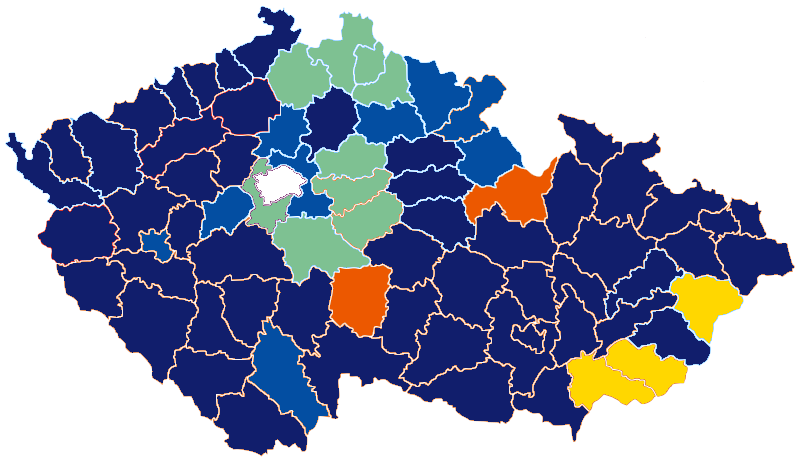
Colour denotes winning party in each district

	Votes	%	Seats
Parliamentary opposition	1,621,879	58.57	402
Government+support	906,199	32.72	228
Others	241,283	8.71	45
Total	2,769,361	100	675

Party (Note: Name of "nominating party" (navrhující strana).)	Votes individually		Votes in coalitions (Note: Includes votes for all coalitions the party participated on.)		Seats		Aftermath	
Party	Votes	%	Votes	%	Seats	+/–	Coalitions	Governors
ANO 2011	604,441	21.82	–	–	178	+2	3 / 13	3 / 13
Czech Pirate Party	333,153	12.02	369,702	13.33	99	+94	9 / 13	0
Civic Democratic Party	192,946	6.96	411,825	14.87	99	+23	13 / 13	4 / 13
Mayors and Independents (Note: Including Mayors for Liberec Region)	221,005	7.97	405,477	14.64	91	+35	9 / 13	4 / 13
Christian and Democratic Union – Czechoslovak People's Party	141,477	5.10	252,598	9.12	53	-8	10 / 13	1 / 13
Czech Social Democratic Party	136,427	4.93	185,714	6.68	37	-88	5 / 13	1 / 13
Freedom and Direct Democracy	169,978	6.16	–	–	35	+17	0 / 13	0
TOP 09	–	–	259,078	9.36	19	0	9 / 13	0
Communist Party of Bohemia and Moravia	131,770	4.75	–	–	13	-73	0 / 13	0
Green Party	4,868	0.18	161,064	5.82	6	+1	5 / 13	0
SNK European Democrats	–	–	53,624	1.94	5	-1	4 / 13	0
South Bohemians 2012	13,010	0.47	–	–	4	0	1 / 13	0
Movement of Independents for Harmonic Development of Municipalities and Cities	5,824	0.21	–	–	4	+1	1 / 13	0
Karlovaráci	5,195	0.19	–	–	3	+3	1 / 13	0
Association of Independent Candidates	4,353	0.16	–	–	3	+3	1 / 13	0
East Bohemians	4,014	0.14	41,668	1.50	3	+1	1 / 13	0
Together for the Region	–	–	24,529	0.89	3	+3	1 / 13	0
Hradec Králové Democratic Club	–	–	13,891	0.50	3	+2	1 / 13	0
Freeholder Party of the Czech Republic	1,097	0.04	22,804	0.82	2	-1	0 / 13	0
For Olomouc	–	–	34,519	1.25	2	+1	1 / 13	0
FOR PLZEŇ	–	–	25,881	0.93	2	+1	1 / 13	0
Mayors for the Citizens	–	–	21,038	0.76	2	+2	1 / 13	0
Civic Forum of Ústí nad Labem	–	–	11,953	0.43	2	+2	0 / 13	0
FOR Most	–	–	11,953	0.43	2	+2	0 / 13	0
Tricolour Citizens' Movement	69,176	2.50	89,601	3.24	1	+1	0 / 13	0
Non-Partisians	–	–	44,606	1.61	1	0	1 / 13	0
SOL Movement	–	–	37,753	1.36	1	+1	1 / 13	0
Voice	–	–	26,420	0.95	1	+1	1 / 13	0
We are FOR!	–	–	12,220	0.44	1	+1	1 / 13	0
Other parties	90,610	3.27	–	–	0	–	–	–
Invalid/blank votes	35,364	–	–	–	–	–	–	–
Total	2,804,725	100			675	0	13	13
Registered voters/turnout	7,399,299	37.95						
Source: Volby.cz

=== Regions ===
Region	ANO	ODS	Pirates	STAN	KDU-ČSL	ČSSD	SPD	TOP 09	KSČM	Greens	Other	Total	Coalition (Note: Legend: light green: Coalitions including ANO, the major party in Andrej Babiš' Second Cabinet; light red: Coalitions not including ANO)	Governor	Party
Central Bohemian	15	16	12	18	(Note: As nominees of STAN, two members of KDU-ČSL were elected.)	—	—	2	—	1	1	65	STAN-ODS-Pirates-TOP 09-Greens-Voice	Petra Pecková	STAN
South Bohemian	12	12	9	5	4	6	—	3	—	—	4	55	ODS-ČSSD-KDU ČSL-TOP 09-JIH 12	Martin Kuba	ODS
Plzeň	12	9	7	4	—	3	3	2	2	1	2	45	ODS-Pirates-STAN-TOP 09-Greens	Ilona Mauritzová	ODS
Karlovy Vary	13	2	6	7	2	—	4	1	—	—	10	45	STAN-Pirates-ODS-KDU ČSL-TOP 09-Local movements	Petr Kulhánek	STAN
Ústí nad Labem	17	8	6	7	(Note: As a nominee of ODS, one member of KDU-ČSL was elected.)	—	5	1	4	1	6	55	ANO-ODS-TOP 09-Greens-SNK ED-JP!	Jan Schiller	ANO
Liberec	10	5	5	22	—	—	3	—	—	—	—	45	SLK-Pirates-ODS	Martin Půta	STAN
Hradec Králové	12	6	7	3	4	4	2	1	—	—	6	45	ODS-Pirates-KDU ČSL-STAN-VČ-HDK-TOP 09	Martin Červíček	ODS
Pardubice	11	6	7	4	4	5	—	2	—	—	6	45	ODS-ČSSD-KDU ČSL-STAN-TOP 09-SNK ED	Martin Netolický	ČSSD
Vysočina	10	5	7	4	6	6	—	—	3	—	4	45	Pirates-KDU ČSL-ČSSD-ODS-STAN-SNK ED	Vítězslav Schrek	ODS
South Moravian	15	9	10	6	11	4	4	4	—	1	1	65	KDU ČSL-Pirates-ODS-STAN	Jan Grolich	KDU-ČSL
Olomouc	18	7	8	5	6	—	5	2	—	2	2	55	Pirates-ODS-KDU ČSL-STAN-TOP 09-Greens	Josef Suchánek	STAN
Zlín	9	5	6	6	9	4	3	(Note: As a nominee of STAN, one member of TOP 09 was elected.)	—	(Note: As a nominee of ČSSD, one member of the Green Party was elected.)	3	45	ANO-Pirates-ODS-ČSSD-Greens	Radim Holiš	ANO
Moravian-Silesian	24	9	9	—	7	5	6	1	4	—	—	65	ANO-ODS-KDU ČSL-ČSSD-TOP 09	Ivo Vondrák	ANO
Total	178	99	99	91	53	37	35	19	13	6	45	675			
In government	3	13	9	8	8+2	5	0	9+1	0	4+1	7	13			
