= Martin Netolický =

Czech politician

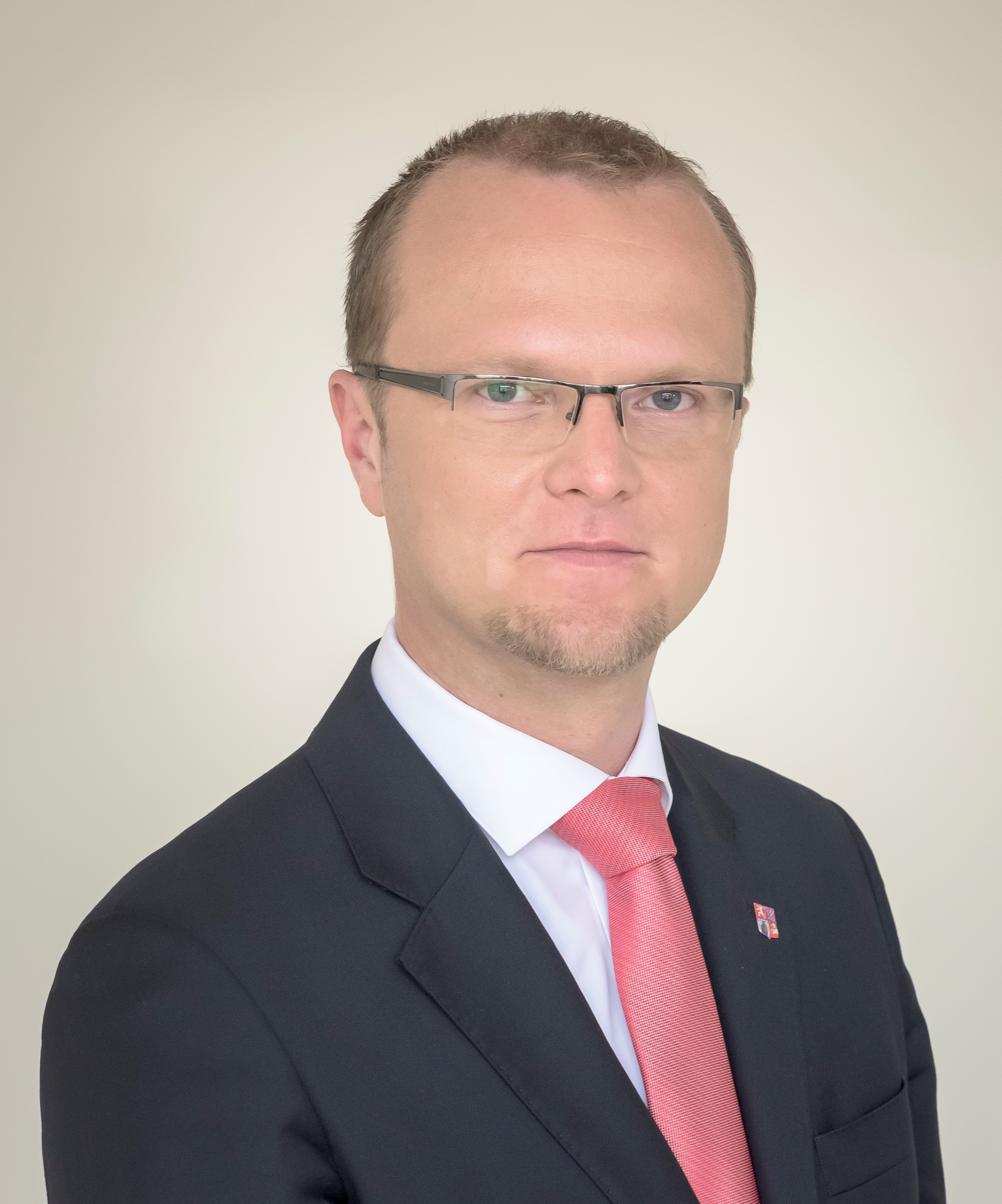

Governor of Pardubice Region
- Incumbent
- Assumed office 2 November 2012
- Preceded by: Radko Martínek

Chairman of MY
- Incumbent
- Assumed office 27 August 2026
- Preceded by: Petr Fiala

Personal details
- Born: 22 September 1982 (age 44) Ústí nad Orlicí, Czechoslovakia
- Party: SOCDEM (2020–2025); MY (since 2025)
- Education: Masaryk University

Martin Netolický (born 22 September 1982) is a Czech politician who has served as governor of Pardubice Region since 2012. He has been a member of Regional Assembly of Pardubice Region since 2008 and Member of City Assembly of Česká Třebová since 2006. specialized mainly in the area of budget law and financing of territorial self-governing units.

== Early life and education ==
Netolický graduated from Masaryk University, specialising in the area of budget law and financing of territorial self-governing units.

== Political career ==
Netolický was first elected to the council of Česká Třebová in 2006. He successfully ran for the Pardubice Regional Council in 2008.

In the 2012 Czech regional elections, Netolický was a ČSSD candidate for the Pardubice region, receiving a total of 21.31% votes and 12 mandates. He was elected by a large majority of 40 out of 44 deputies, thus gaining the support of the majority of the opposition as well.

In the 2014 Czech municipal elections, Netolický defended the post of representative of the city of Česká Třebová for the ČSSD, where he succeeded thanks to preferential votes. When Netolický moved from ninth to first place, the party won six mandates in the city.

In the 2016 Czech regional elections, Netolický was the leader of the ČSSD in the Pardubice region, defending the mandate of the regional representative. On 21 October 2016, he was elected as the governor of the Pardubice Region again, having won votes of 33 of the 44 representatives present).

On 7 April 2018, Netolický was elected deputy chairman of the party at the ČSSD convention in Hradec Králové. In the 2018 Czech municipal elections, he succeeded as a member of the ČSSD thanks to preferential votes, moving from sixth to first place. Netolický held the position of vice-chairman of the party until the ČSSD congress in March 2019.

In the 2020 Czech regional elections, Netolický was the leader of the entity "3PK – For a prosperous Pardubice region". He eventually defended the mandate of the regional representative. On 26 October 2020, Netolický was elected as the governor of the Pardubice Region for the third time, winning 27 out of 45 votes.

During the 2021 Czech parliamentary election, Netolický was originally supposed to run for the ČSSD in the Pardubice region, but resigned from his position on the candidate list. For the post of party chairman, he publicly supported his unsuccessful opponent and Minister of Foreign Affairs of the Czech Republic, Tomáš Petříček.

In May 2021, the chairman of the ČSSD, Jan Hamáček, dismissed Netolický from his position as a member of the supervisory board of the Czech Post. This happened only the day after Netolický confirmed that he had met Hamáček in April and discussed his canceled trip to Moscow due to the COVID-19 pandemic.

In the 2022 Czech municipal elections, Netolický ran for the council of Česká and finished first place, thus defending the mandate of the representative.

At the 45th ČSSD party congress in June 2023, Netolický also defended the position as candidate of the ČSSD with 131 votes.

On 11 October 2024, Netolický was elected as the governor of the Pardubice Region for the fourth time, winning 38 out of 45 votes.

In June 2025, Netolický left Social Democracy, in protest at the party's attempts to cooperate with the Stačilo! alliance in the forthcoming elections.

In October 2025, Netolický joined the political party MY.
