= 2024 Czech regional elections =

- 20–21 September 2024

All 675 seats in the regional councils
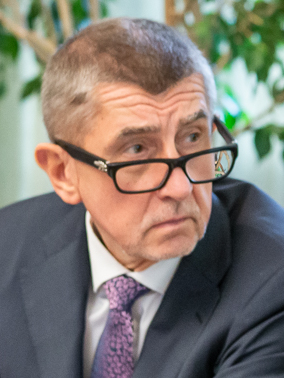

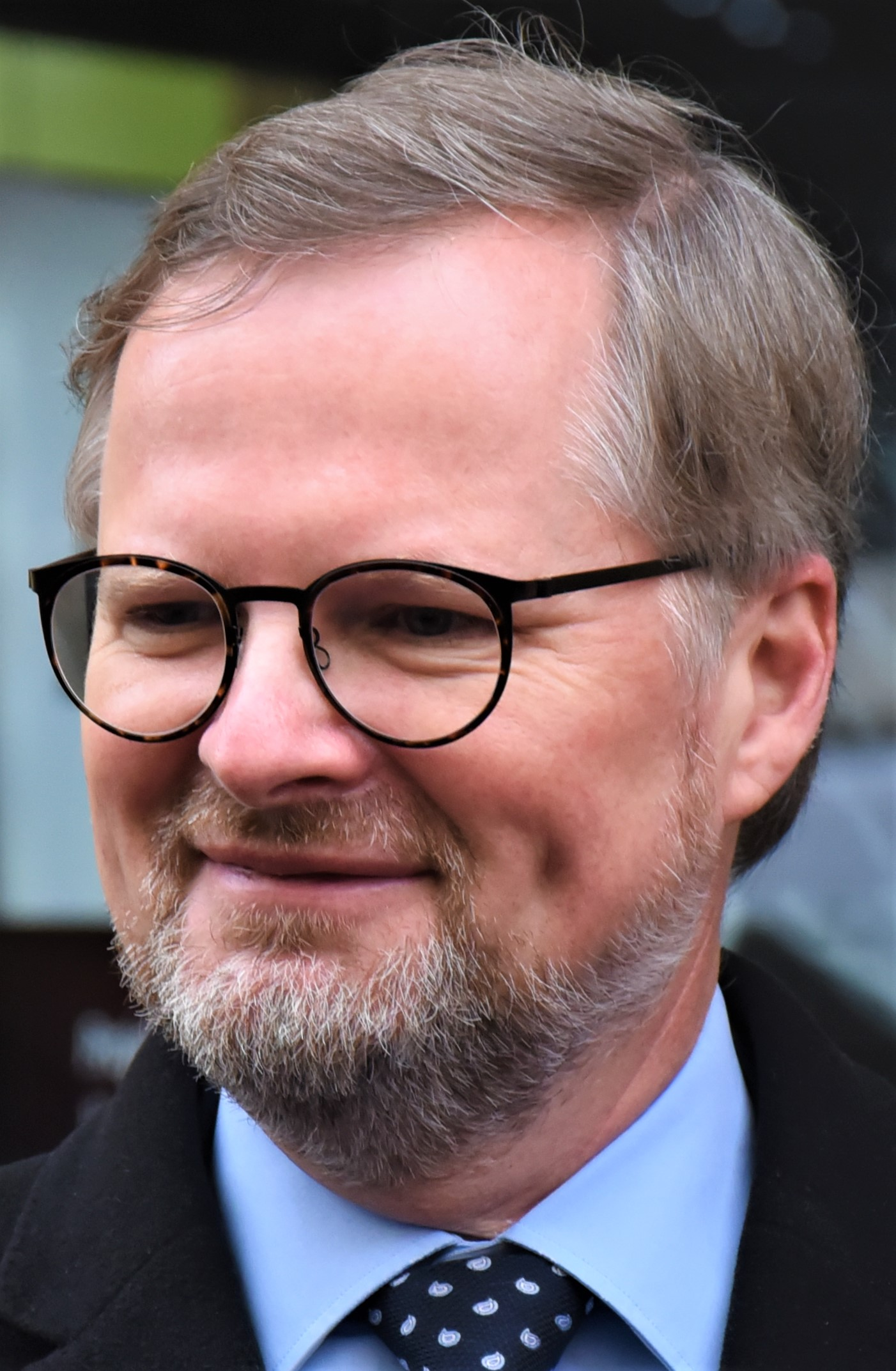

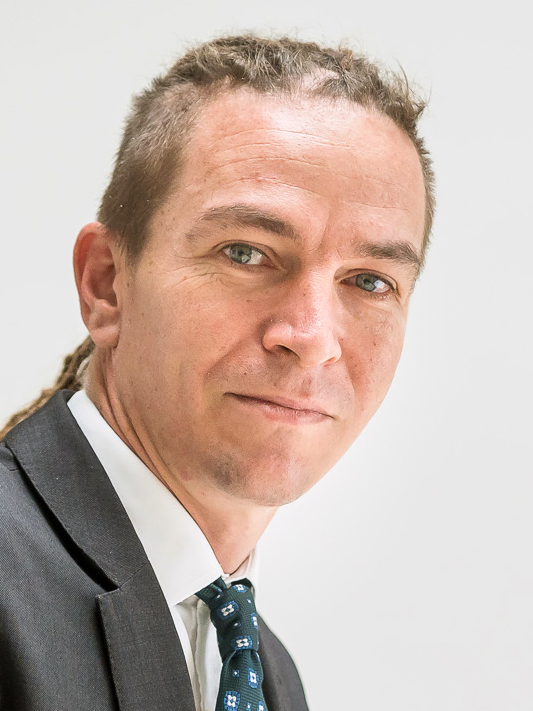

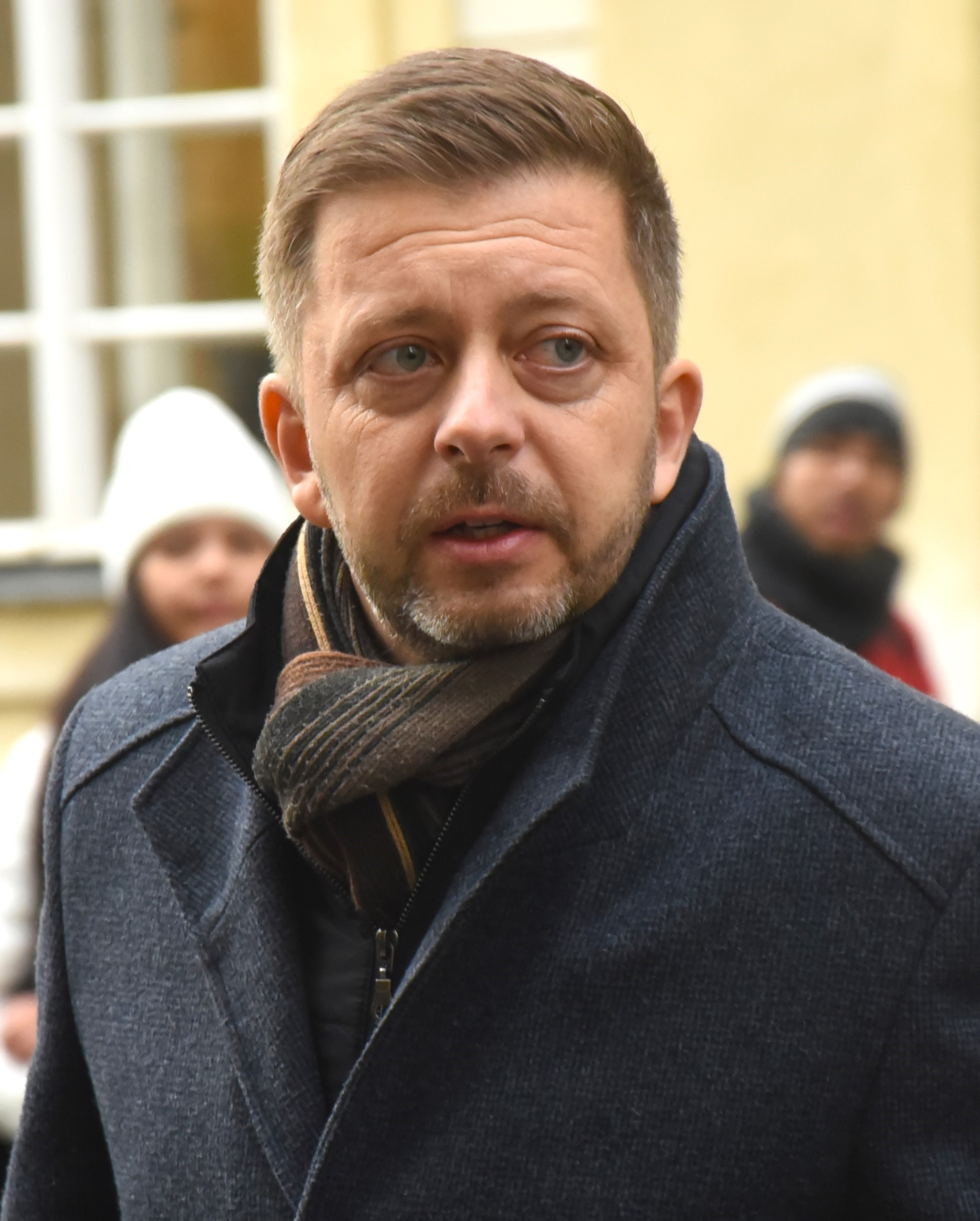

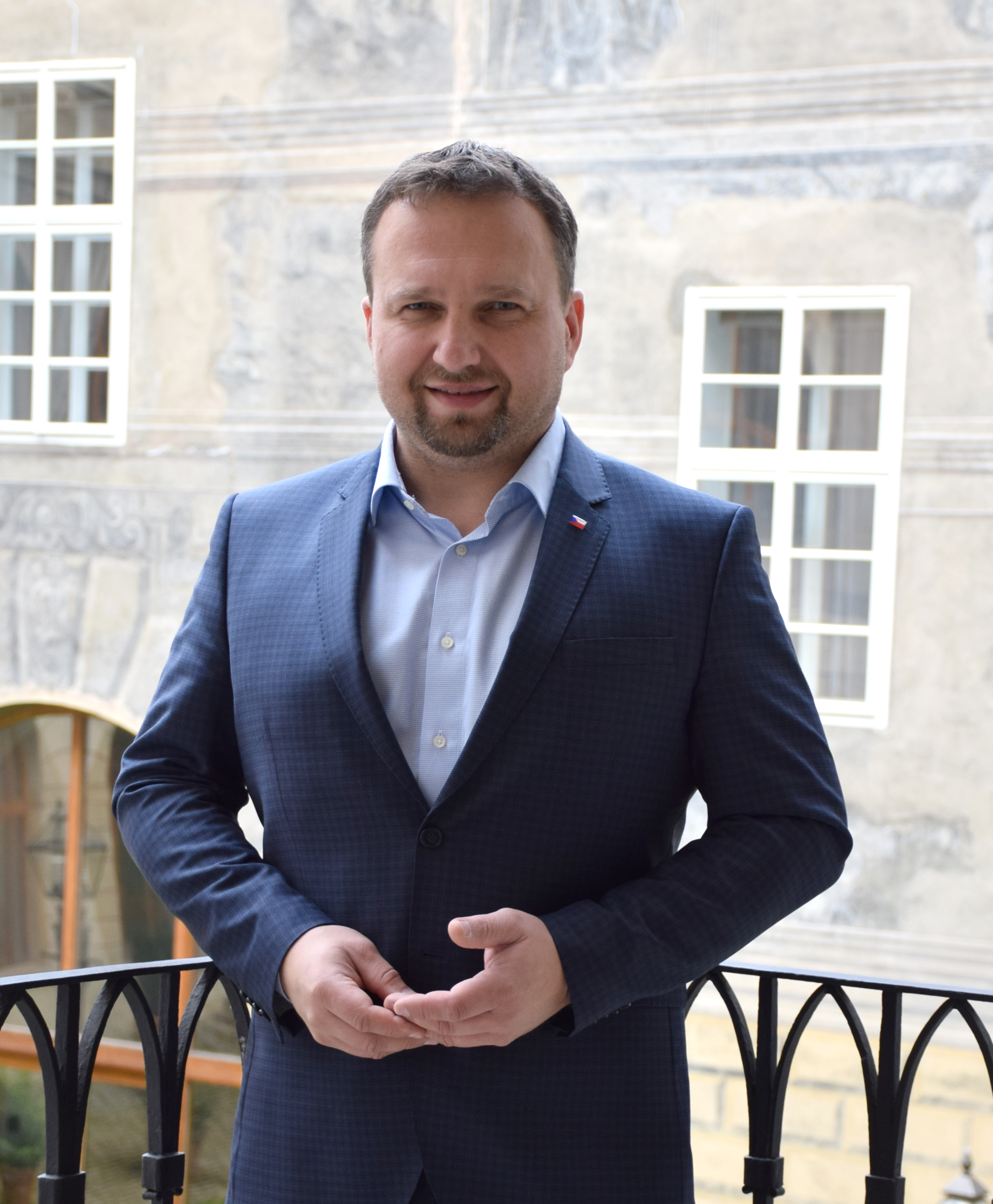

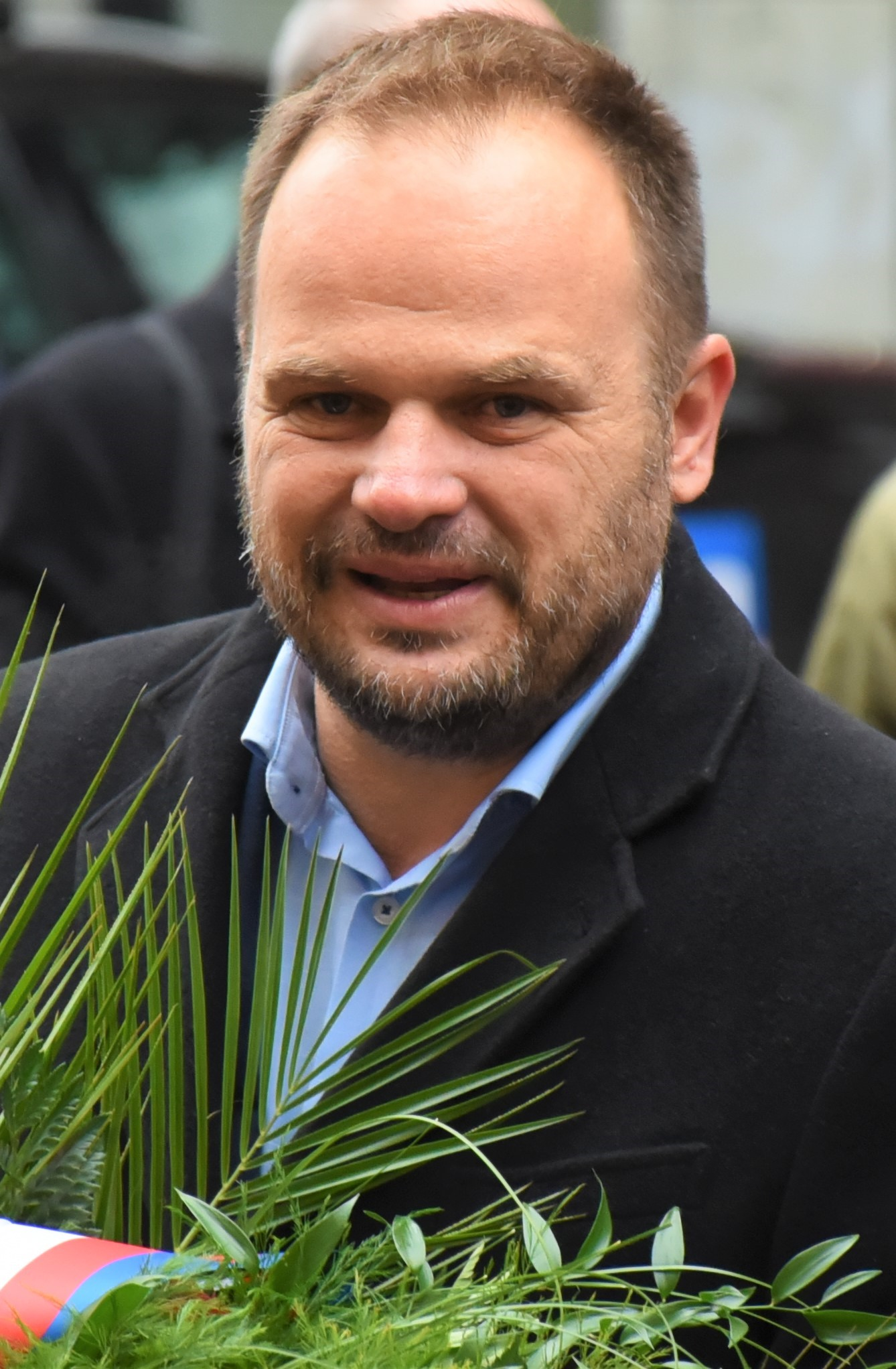

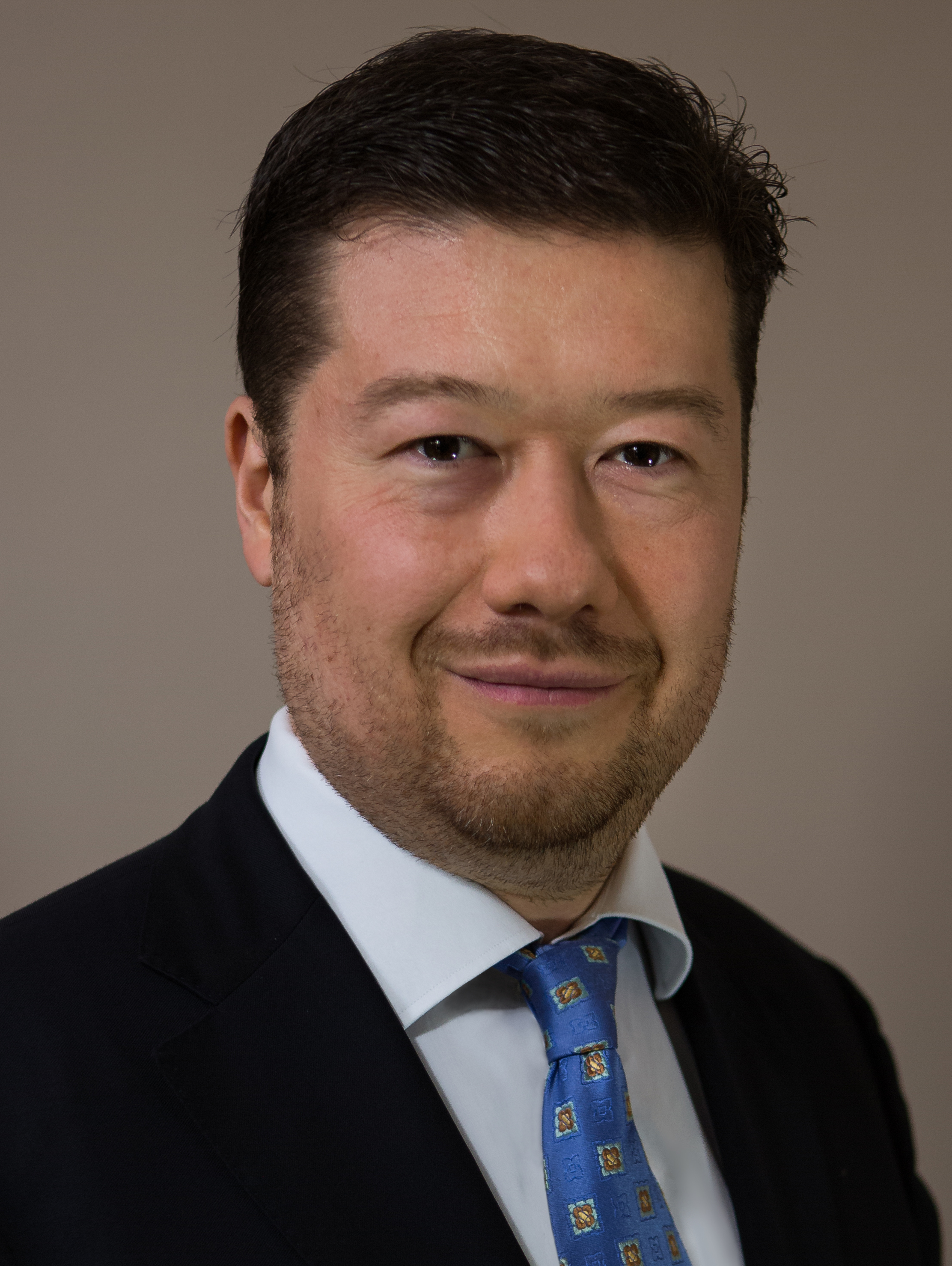

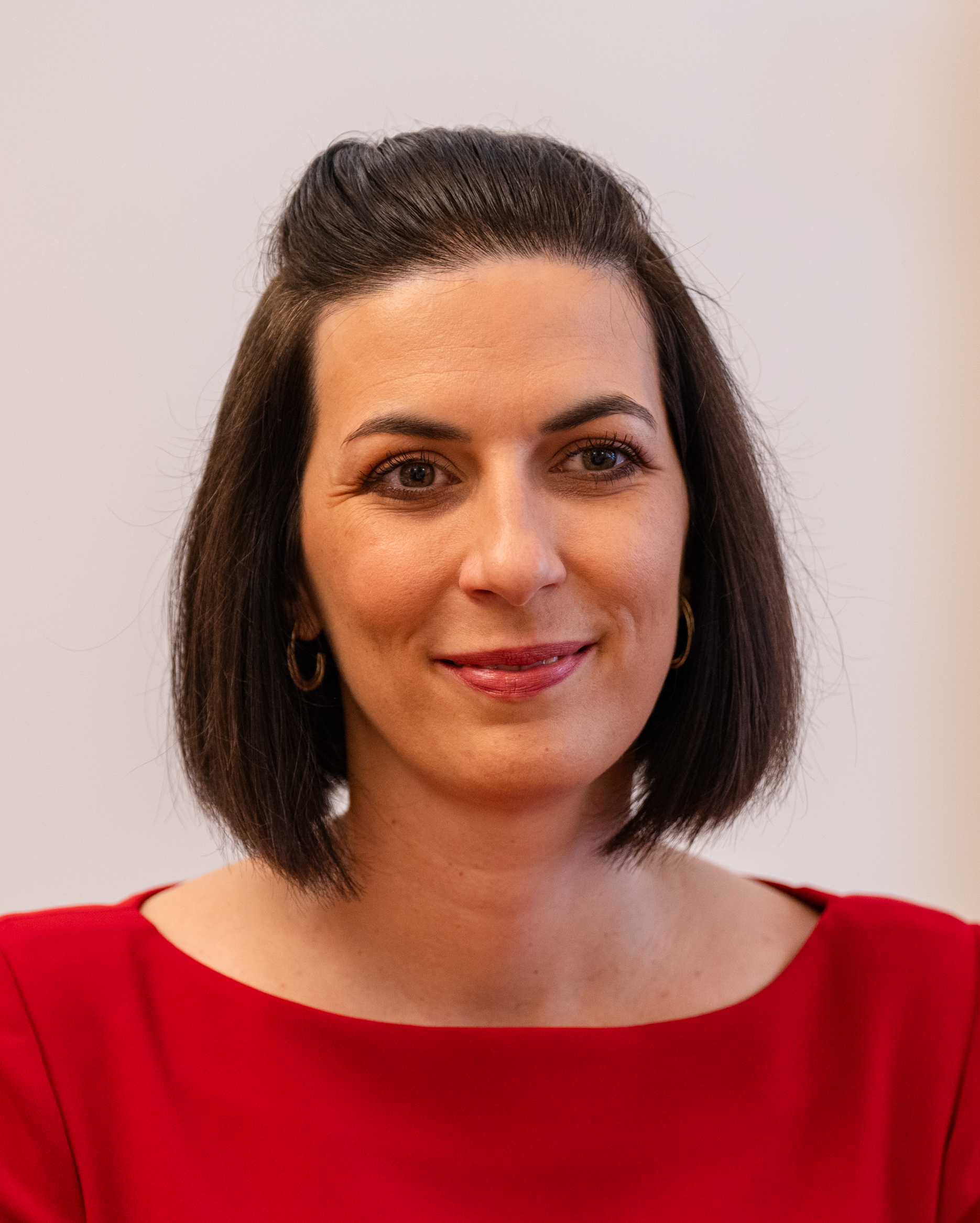

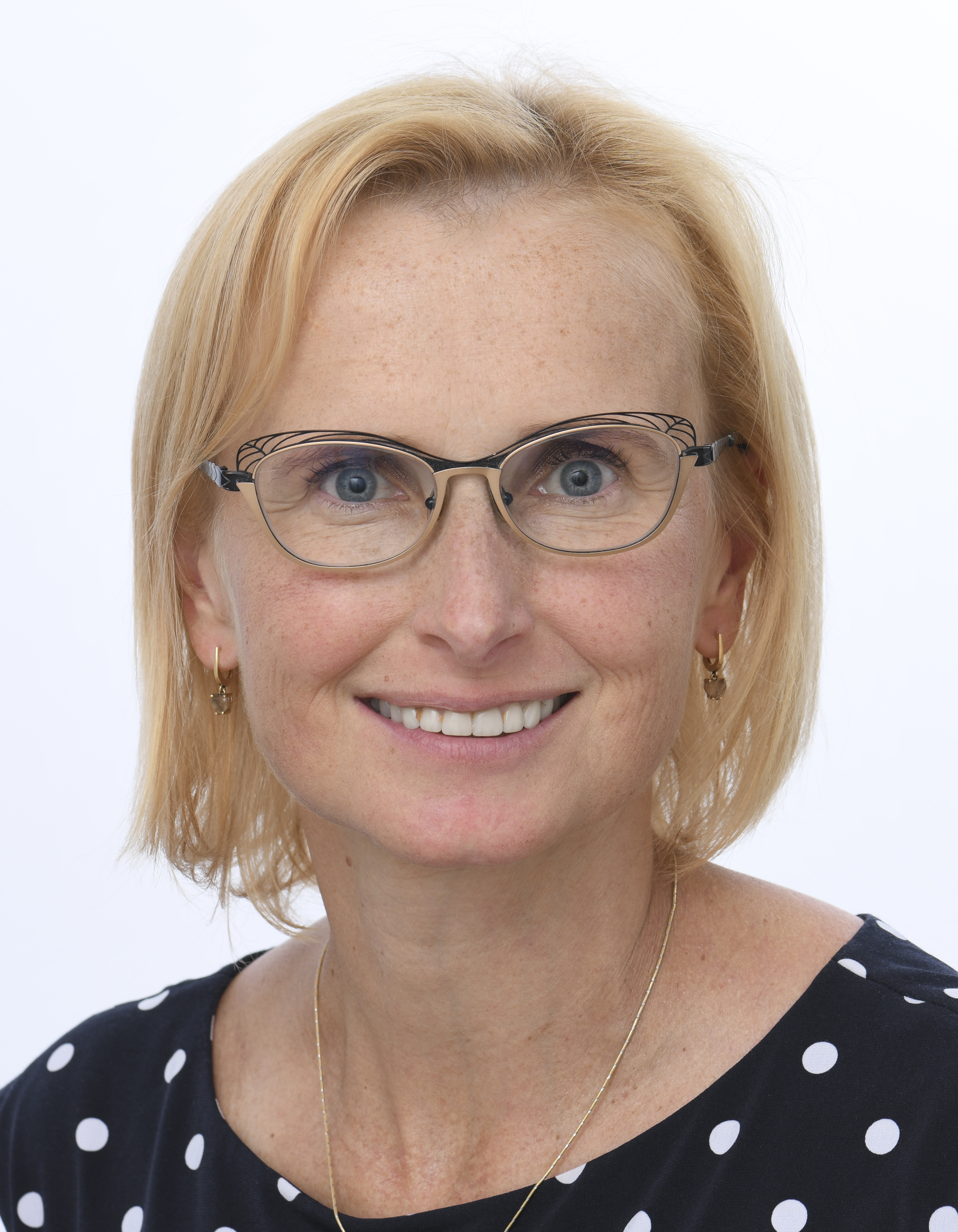
	First party	Second party	Third party
Leader	Andrej Babiš	Petr Fiala	Ivan Bartoš
Party	ANO	ODS	Pirates
Last election	178		99
Seats before	172	99	99
Seats won	292	106	3
Seat change	▲114	▲7	▼96
Popular vote	842,947	581,407
Percentage	35.38%	24.40
Governors	8	1	0
	Fourth party	Fifth party	Sixth party
Leader	Vít Rakušan	Marian Jurečka	Michal Šmarda
Party	STAN	KDU-ČSL	SOCDEM
Last election			37
Seats before	87	56	34
Seats won	73	49	13
Seat change	▲6	▼4	▼24
Governors	2	1	1
	Seventh party	Eighth party	Ninth party
Leader	Tomio Okamura	Markéta Pekarová Adamová	Kateřina Konečná
Party	SPD	TOP 09	KSČM
Seats before	35	20	12
Seats won	32	16	32
Seat change	▼3	▼3	▲20
Governors	0	0	0
Chairman of the Regional Association before election
Martin Kuba
ODS
Elected Chairman of the Regional Association
Radim Holiš
ANO

2024 Czech regional elections were held on 20 and 21 September 2024 to elect all 675 members of all 13 Czech regional councils. The regional elections are held together with the first round of the 2024 Czech Senate election. The election resulted in landslide victory for ANO which won 292 of 675 seats and finished first in 10 of 13 regions. Civic Democratic Party of Prime Minister Petr Fiala finished second with 106 seats. ANO didn't win in South Bohemian region, South Moravian region and Liberec region.

Victory in South Bohemian region was viewed as the only large win for Civic Democrats. It was attributed to South Bohemian Governor Martin Kuba who was seen as biggest victor of regional elections as he won 47.5% of votes and majority in South Bohemian assembly.

Czech Pirate Party was heavily defeated winning only 3 seats despite previously holding 99 seats. Leader of the party Ivan Bartoš resigned as a result of electoral defeat.

== Voting system ==
Elections are held in each region to elect its regional council, which is composed of 45 to 65 regional councilors, who will elect the governor of the region. Elections are held using open list proportional representation method, with a 5% threshold for both parties and coalitions in each region. The minimum age for both voting and candidacy is 18 years.

== Results ==
Party or alliance		Votes	%	Seats	+/–
ANO 2011		842,947	35.38	292	+114
Spolu	Spolu (ODS+TOP 09+KDU-ČSL)	240,768	10.11	59	–
Spolu	ODS	140,544	5.90	54	–45
Spolu	KDU-ČSL+ODS+VČ	39,045	1.64	13	–
Spolu	ODS+TOP 09	38,398	1.61	14	–
Spolu	ODS+TOP 09+STO	31,144	1.31	11	–
Spolu	KDU-ČSL+Z21	28,247	1.19	10	–
Spolu	Pro PaK (KDU-ČSL+SNK ED+Nes)	16,680	0.70	6	–
Spolu	KDU-ČSL+Zelení+Nes+TOP 09	15,008	0.63	6	–
Spolu	KDU-ČSL	12,538	0.53	4	–49
Spolu	KDU-ČSL+PROPLZEŇ	9,293	0.39	4	–
Spolu	TOP 09+KDU-ČSL+T2020	8,202	0.34	0	–
Spolu	KDU-ČSL+SNK 1	1,540	0.06	0	–
Spolu	Total	581,407	24.40	181	+10
STAN and allies	STAN	130,347	5.47	38	–31
STAN and allies	STAN+OK	41,525	1.74	11	–
STAN and allies	Mayors for the Liberec Region	39,464	1.66	20	–2
STAN and allies	STAN+SNK ED	36,408	1.53	13	–
STAN and allies	STAN+PRO Zdraví	21,126	0.89	7	–
STAN and allies	STAN+SOL	18,680	0.78	4	–
STAN and allies	STAN+TOP 09+LES+HD	17,792	0.75	6	–
STAN and allies	STAN+TOP 09+ZVUK	15,929	0.67	5	–
STAN and allies	STAN+HOPB	5,361	0.23	0	–
STAN and allies	Total	326,632	13.71	104	+13
SPD+Trikolora+PRO	SPD+Trikolora+PRO	79,064	3.32	18	–
SPD+Trikolora+PRO	SPD+Trikolora+PRO+Svobodní	42,715	1.79	12	–
SPD+Trikolora+PRO	SPD+Trikolora	19,017	0.80	9	–
SPD+Trikolora+PRO	SPD	7,865	0.33	2	–33
SPD+Trikolora+PRO	PRO	3,959	0.17	0	–
SPD+Trikolora+PRO	PRO+SpV	1,030	0.04	0	–
SPD+Trikolora+PRO	Trikolora	718	0.03	0	–1
SPD+Trikolora+PRO	Total	154,368	6.48	41	+5
Stačilo!	KSČM+ČSNS+ČSSD	53,546	2.25	16	–
Stačilo!	KSČM+ČSNS	34,187	1.43	7	–
Stačilo!	KSČM+ČSNS+SD–SN+ČSSD+DOMOV	19,816	0.83	4	–
Stačilo!	KSČM+ČSNS+SOCDEM	14,052	0.59	5	–
Stačilo!	KSČM+ČSNS+SD–SN+ČSSD	10,247	0.43	4	–
Stačilo!	KSČM+ČSNS+SD–SN	9,602	0.40	4	–
Stačilo!	ČSSD+DOMOV	2,604	0.11	0	–
Stačilo!	KSČM	1,786	0.07	0	–13
Stačilo!	ČSSD+CiKR	953	0.04	0	–
Stačilo!	SD–SN+SproK	801	0.03	0	–
Stačilo!	Total	147,594	6.20	40	+27
Czech Pirate Party	Pirates	85,169	3.57	3	–96
Czech Pirate Party	Pirates+ProOl	6,998	0.29	0	–
Czech Pirate Party	Total	92,167	3.87	3	–96
Social Democracy	SOCDEM	39,854	1.67	3	–34
Social Democracy	SOCDEM+SproK+VČ	30,770	1.29	11	–
Social Democracy	SOCDEM+SproK+RH	10,324	0.43	3	–
Social Democracy	SOCDEM+SproK	2,881	0.12	0	–
Social Democracy	Total	83,829	3.52	17	–20
Přísaha		47,222	1.98	0	–
Green Party	Greens+SNK ED+TOP 09+JP	7,112	0.30	0	–
Green Party	Greens+SEN 21	6,404	0.27	0	–
Green Party	Greens+LES+SEN 21+Idealisté	6,050	0.25	0	–
Green Party	Greens+LES	3,169	0.13	0	–
Green Party	Greens+The Left	1,220	0.05	0	–
Green Party	Total	23,955	1.01	0	–6
Svo+Sou+NEZ+SD	Svobodní+Soukromníci+NEZ	3,765	0.16	0	–
Svo+Sou+NEZ+SD	Svobodní+Soukromníci	1,950	0.08	0	–
Svo+Sou+NEZ+SD	NEZ+DV 2016	1,813	0.08	0	–
Svo+Sou+NEZ+SD	SD	1,655	0.07	0	–
Svo+Sou+NEZ+SD	Svobodní+SD	525	0.02	0	–
Svo+Sou+NEZ+SD	Total	9,708	0.41	0	–2
Moravané	Moravané+MZH	3,798	0.16	0	–
Moravané	Moravané	2,106	0.09	0	–
Moravané	Total	5,904	0.25	0	–
Other		66,689	2.80	7	–
Total		2,382,422	100.00	685	–
Source: Czech Statistical Office

=== Distribution of seats for individual parties ===
Results by parties
Party	Seats	+/–
ANO 2011	292	+114
Civic Democratic Party	106	+7
Mayors and Independents	73	+6
KDU-ČSL	49	–4
Communist Party of Bohemia and Moravia	32	+19
Freedom and Direct Democracy	32	–3
Mayors for the Liberec Region	20	–2
TOP 09	16	–3
Social Democracy	13	–24
Law, Respect, Expertise	7	+7
Personalities for the Region	6	
Together for Region	5	
East Bohemians	4	
Better North	4	
Non-Partisans	3	
Czech Pirate Party	3	–96
Mayors for Citizens	3	
Choice for Region	3	
Czech National Social Party	2	
United Democrats – Association of Independents	2	
Czech Sovereignty of Social Democracy	2	
Zlín 21	2	
Svobodní	1	
Liberal-Environmental Party	1	
PRO PLZEŇ	1	
SOL Movement	1	
Hradec Democratic Club	1	
Tricolour	1	0

=== Regions ===
Region	ANO	ODS	STAN	KDU-ČSL	KSČM	SPD	SLK	TOP 09	SOCDEM	PRO2022	Pirates	ČSNS	SD-SN	ČSSD	Svobodní	LES	Trikolora	Others	Total	Coalition (Note: Legend: light green: Coalitions including ODS, the major party in Petr Fiala's Cabinet; light red: Coalitions not including ODS)	Governor	Party
Central Bohemian	25	9 (Note: Elected as members of KDU+ODS+TOP 09 coalition)	20	2	2 (Note: Elected as members of ČSNS+KSČM+ČSSD coalition)	4 (Note: Elected as members of SPD+Trikol+PRO coalition)	—N/a	2	—N/a	—N/a	—N/a	—N/a	—N/a	1	—N/a	—N/a	—N/a	—N/a	65	STAN-ODS-KDU ČSL-TOP 09	Petra Pecková	STAN
South Bohemian	17	34	—N/a	—N/a	3 (Note: Elected as members of ČSNS-KSČM-SD-ČSSD coalition)	—N/a	—N/a	—N/a	—N/a	—N/a	—N/a	1	—N/a	—N/a	—N/a	—N/a	—N/a	—N/a	55	ODS	Martin Kuba	ODS
Plzeň	24	7 (Note: Elected as members of ODS-TOP 09 coalition)	8	3 (Note: Elected as members of KDUČSL+PROPLZEŇ coalition)	3 (Note: Elected as members of ČSNS+KSČM+SD-SN coalition)	3 (Note: Elected as members of SPD+Trikolora coalition)	—N/a	2	—N/a	—N/a	3	—N/a	1	—N/a	—N/a	—N/a	—N/a	1 (Note: PRO PLZEŇ' candidate, elected as member of KDUČSL+PROPLZEŇ coalition)	55	ANO-STAN-KDU ČSL-PRO PLZEŇ	Kamal Farhan	ANO
Karlovy Vary	28	3	7	—N/a	—N/a	4	—N/a	—N/a	—N/a	—N/a	—N/a	—N/a	—N/a	—N/a	—N/a	—N/a	—N/a	3 (Note: Elected as member of Choice for Region party)	45	ANO	Jana Mračková	ANO
Ústí nad Labem	26	7	2 (Note: Elected as members of STAN+PRO Zdraví coalition)	—N/a	3 (Note: Elected as members of ČSNS+SOCDE+KSČM Zdraví coalition)	5	—N/a	—N/a	2	1	—N/a	—N/a	—N/a	—N/a	—N/a	—N/a	—N/a	5 (Note: Independent candidates, elected as members of STAN+PRO Zdraví coalition) 2 (Note: ProMOST candidates, elected as members of Better North coalition) 1 (Note: Vaše Ústí candidate, elected as member of Better North coalition) 1 (Note: Nový Sever candidate, elected as member of Better North coalition)	55	ANO-ODS-Better North coalition	Richard Brabec	ANO
Liberec	18	3	—N/a	1	—N/a	2	20	1	—N/a	—N/a	—N/a	—N/a	—N/a	—N/a	—N/a	—N/a	—N/a	—N/a	45	SLK-ODS-KDU ČSL-TOP 09	Martin Půta	SLK
Hradec Králové	18	6 (Note: Elected as members of KDU-ČSL+ODS+VČ coalition)	3 (Note: Elected as members of STAN+TOP+LES+HD coalition)	4	2 (Note: Elected as members of ČSNS+KSČM coalition)	1 (Note: Elected as members of Svo+SPD+Tri+PRO coalition)	—N/a	1	3 (Note: Elected as members of SOCDEM+SproK+RH coalition)	1	—N/a	—N/a	—N/a	—N/a	1	1	—N/a	3 (Note: East Bohemians' party candidates, elected as members of KDU-ČSL+ODS+VČ coalition) 1 (Note: Hradec Democratic Club party candidate, elected as member of STAN+TOP+LES+HD coalition)	45	ANO-SOCDEM-SPD-PRO2022-Svobodní	Petr Koleta	ANO
Pardubice	15	4	3	4 (Note: Elected as members of Pro PaK coalition)	3	—N/a	—N/a	1	5 (Note: Elected as members of SOCDEM+VČ+SproK coalition)	2	—N/a	—N/a	—N/a	—N/a	—N/a	—N/a	—N/a	5 (Note: Together for Region party candidates, elected as members of SOCDEM+VČ+SproK coalition) 2 (Note: Independent candidates, elected as members of Pro PaK coalition) 1 (Note: East Bohemians party candidate, elected as member of SOCDEM+VČ+SproK coalition)	45	ANO-SOCDEM-Together for Region-KDU ČSL-ODS-TOP 09-East Bohemians-	Martin Netolický	SOCDEM
Vysočina	18	6 (Note: Elected as members of ODS+TOP 09+STO coalition)	4 (Note: Elected as members of STAN+SNK ED coalition)	4	3	1	—N/a	2	3	1	—N/a	—N/a	—N/a	—N/a	—N/a	—N/a	—N/a	3 (Note: Mayors for Citizens's candidates, elected as members of ODS+TOP 09+STO coalition)	45			
South Moravian	22	12	3 (Note: Elected as members of STAN-SOL coalition)	15	2 (Note: Elected as members of NS-KSČM-SD-ČSSD-DOM coalition)	2	—N/a	4	—N/a	1	—N/a	—N/a	1	1	—N/a	—N/a	1	1 (Note: SOL candidate, elected as member of STAN-SOL coalition) 1 (Note: Independent candidate, elected as member of KDU+ODS+TOP 09 coalition)	65	KDU ČSL-ODS-STAN-TOP 09-SOL Movement	Jan Grolich	KDU-ČSL
Olomouc	26	5	9	4 (Note: Elected as members of KDU+Zel+Nes+TOP coalition)	3	5	—N/a	1	—N/a	—N/a	—N/a	1	—N/a	—N/a	—N/a	—N/a	—N/a	1 (Note: Independent candidate, elected as member of KDU+Zel+Nes+TOP coalition)	55			
Zlín	20	5	4 (Note: Elected as members of STAN+TOP+ZVUK coalition)	8 (Note: Elected as members of KDU-ČSL+Z21 coalition)	3	2	—N/a	1	—N/a	—N/a	—N/a	—N/a	—N/a	—N/a	—N/a	—N/a	—N/a	2 (Note: Zlín 21 candidates, elected as members of KDU-ČSL+Z21 coalition)	45			
Moravian-Silesian	35	5	4 (Note: Elected as members of STAN+OK coalition)	4	5 (Note: Elected as members of ČSNS+KSČM coalition)	3	—N/a	1	—N/a	1	—N/a	—N/a	—N/a	—N/a	—N/a	—N/a	—N/a	6 (Note: Personalities for the Region's candidate, elected as members of STAN+OK coalition) 1 (Note: Krásná Kopřivnice's candidate, elected as members of STAN+OK coalition)	65			
Total	292	106	67	53	32	32	20	16	13	7	3	2	2	2	1	1	1	40	685			
In government																			13			
Source: Programydovoleb.cz, Ct24.ceskatelevize.cz
